= Burnaby Central in the 2025 Canadian federal election =

- April 28, 2025

Riding of Burnaby Central
- Registered: 84,278
- Turnout: 51,923 (61.61%)
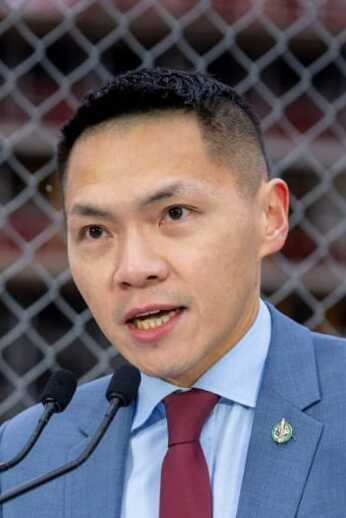

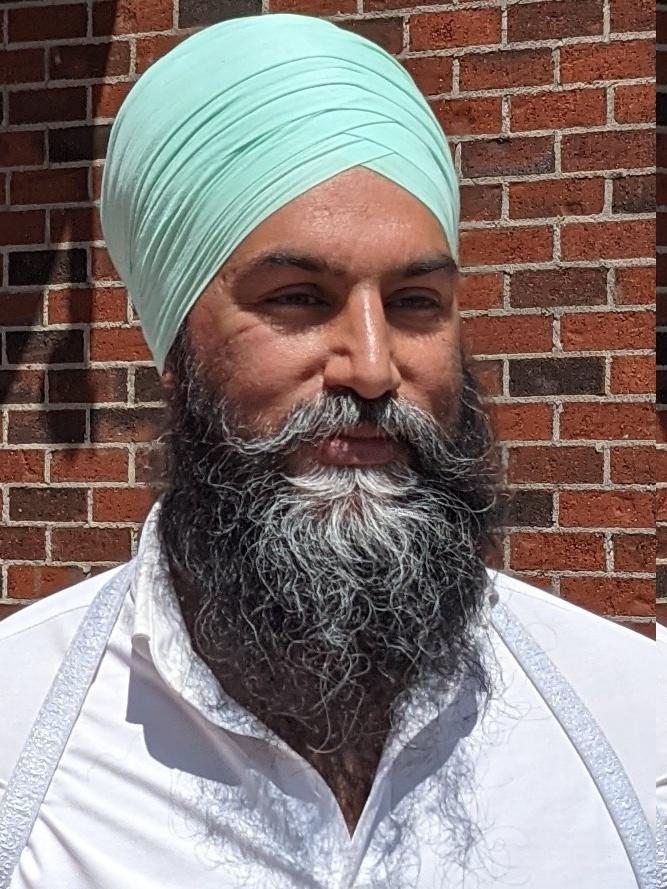
	First party	Second party	Third party
		CPC
Candidate	Wade Chang	James Yan	Jagmeet Singh
Party	Liberal	Conservative	New Democratic
Popular vote	21,745	19,889	9,353
Percentage	42.23%	38.62%	18.16%
Swing	▲10.98pp	▲16.46pp	▼21.62pp
- Results by polling division
MP before election
None (Note: New riding was created from parts of Burnaby South (abolished), New Westminster—Burnaby (adjusted and renamed), and Burnaby North—Seymour (adjusted). Jagmeet Singh (NDP), Peter Julian (NDP), and Terry Beech (Liberal) were the incumbents of those ridings. Singh was widely considered to be the incumbent candidate as his former riding of Burnaby South aligned most closely to the new Burnaby Central boundaries.)
New Democratic (transposed)
Elected MP
Wade Chang
Liberal

An election occurred in the federal electoral district of Burnaby Central on April 28, 2025, as part of the 2025 Canadian federal election. Liberal Party candidate Wade Chang won the seat while unseating the New Democratic Party leader Jagmeet Singh, who ultimately placed third. During the campaign, it was considered to be one of the most-watched races in British Columbia.

== Background ==
=== Riding history ===
The riding of Burnaby Central was established in 2023, mostly replacing the riding of Burnaby South. Burnaby Central gained some portions of Burnaby North—Seymour and New Westminster—Burnaby, while losing some southern parts of Burnaby to the new riding of Vancouver Fraserview—South Burnaby. The area was a longtime New Democratic stronghold, as the NDP had won every election in the former seats of Burnaby (1979–1988), Burnaby—Kingsway (1988–1997), Burnaby—Douglas (1997–2015), and Burnaby South (2015–2025). The Burnaby South seat had been held by NDP leader Jagmeet Singh since a February 2019 by-election. Although technically a new riding, Singh was widely considered to be the incumbent candidate at the call of the 2025 general election.

=== Pre-campaign period ===
Nationwide, support for the governing Liberal Party had been plummeting since November 2024, and according to polling projections, the riding of Burnaby Central was no different. NDP incumbent Jagmeet Singh was projected to be in a close race with a Conservative challenger for the seat, although Singh was still leading in the polls. However, following the resignation of Justin Trudeau, support for the NDP in the riding began to fall. The lack of support seemed to coincide with a significant boost in support for the Liberals and their presumptive next leader, Mark Carney. By January 12, Burnaby Central projections placed the NDP in second with 36%, and by February 16, the NDP had fallen behind both the Conservatives and the Liberals.

== Campaign ==
The campaign began on March 23 after Prime Minister Mark Carney advised the governor general to dissolve parliament and trigger a snap election. The Conservatives, Liberals, New Democrats, and People's Party all nominated candidates for the race. Along with many other ridings, the Green Party opted to not nominate a candidate for the seat of Burnaby Central. While the NDP were originally leading in poll projections for the riding in December 2024, they had fallen to third place by the time that the writ of election was issued. The NDP found themselves in a precarious position and were struggling to find support in many camps. Their decision to form a confidence and supply agreement with Justin Trudeau's unpopular Liberal government from 2022 to 2024 alienated many of their potential moderate supporters, as the Conservatives became the main party to be associated with a campaign of change. However, as Mark Carney's Liberals began to spike in the polls from January to March, many of the NDP's core supporters began turning to the Liberals. This is due to concerns that vote splitting would result in the successful election of Pierre Poilievre's Conservatives. As the polls indicated a nationwide collapse in support for the NDP, Singh stopped campaigning on the possibility of establishing a government but claimed on April 8 that he was still confident that he could retain a seat of his own in Burnaby, despite riding projections suggesting otherwise.

The race began receiving increased media attention as it became increasingly likely that Singh would lose the race and his seat in Parliament. In Burnaby Central, the NDP began distributing campaign signs that read "BC Votes NDP to Stop Conservatives", which was essentially a plea for voters to consider the NDP as the strategic progressive vote rather than the Liberals in British Columbia. The NDP campaign also argued that the polls were not necessarily accurate and that the results of the 2021 Canadian federal election and the 2024 British Columbia general election (in which the BC NDP swept Burnaby's provincial ridings) more accurately reflected the British Columbian and Burnaby electorate. In the nearby riding of Port Moody—Coquitlam, the Liberal candidate filed a complaint with the Commissioner of Canada Elections due to the NDP allegedly trying to discredit SmartVoting.ca, a website that used polling data to recommend which party to strategically vote for to minimize the chances of a Conservative winning due to a progressive vote split. The website had recommended that progressive voters should vote for the Liberals in many NDP-held ridings in British Columbia, including Burnaby Central.

=== Prediction ===
Source	Ranking			
Source	Lib	Con	NDP	As of
338Canada	38% ± 8%	32% ± 8%	28% ± 8%	25 April 2025

== Aftermath ==
Liberal candidate Wade Chang won the race and became the first Liberal MP to represent the area since Marke Raines, who held the seat of Burnaby—Seymour from 1974 to 1979. He beat the Conservative runner-up, James Yan, by 1,856 votes and led Jagmeet Singh by 12,392 votes. In doing so, he became the second Taiwanese-Canadian to serve as a member of the House of Commons in Canada.

Singh's election loss became emblematic of the party's nationwide performance, where their share of the popular vote dropped to 6%, and their seat count dropped from 24 to 7 seats. After overseeing the NDP's worst electoral defeat in party history and the loss of his own seat, Singh announced that he would resign as party leader following the party's appointment of an interim leader. A few days later, on May 5, the NDP appointed Don Davies to temporarily replace Singh until a leadership election could be held.

Singh was 1 of 2 major party leaders to lose their seat in the general election, as Conservative leader Pierre Poilievre also lost to a Liberal challenger in the riding of Carleton, a seat that he had held since 2004.

On May 24, the CBC reported that the NDP made a considerable but potentially disproportionate effort to save Singh's electoral chances, which may have diverted campaign resources away from other ridings that the NDP went on to lose. In the neighbouring riding of New Westminster—Burnaby—Maillardville, for example, which was also considered to be an NDP safe seat for the past several elections, the incumbent Peter Julian lost to Liberal challenger Jake Sawatzky by less than 2,000 votes. Considering how poorly the NDP were polling in Burnaby Central during the campaign, many political writers and analysts maintained that the decision to direct an excess of campaign resources to Burnaby Central may have cost the NDP in closer races such as in New Westminster—Burnaby—Maillardville, Elmwood—Transcona, or Skeena–Bulkley Valley. The decision was also criticized as Singh's resignation as leader likely would have occurred regardless of the Burnaby Central result due to the party's poor performance on a national scale. Therefore, keeping Singh in Parliament should arguably not have not been one of the party's top priorities.

== Result ==
2025 Canadian federal election: Burnaby Central
Party	Candidate	Votes	%	±%	Expenditures
Liberal	Wade Chang	21,745	42.23	+10.98	$75,752.57
Conservative	James Yan	19,889	38.62	+16.47	$122,829.34
New Democratic	Jagmeet Singh	9,353	18.16	–21.62	$129,759.41
People's	Richard Farbridge	506	0.98	–2.40	$585.48
Total valid votes/expense limit		51,493	99.17	–	$129,924.64
Total rejected ballots		430	0.83	–	
Turnout		51,923	61.27	–	
Eligible voters		84,744			
Liberal notional gain from New Democratic		Swing		+16.30	
Source: Elections Canada

== Previous result ==
2021 federal election redistributed results
Party	Vote	%
New Democratic	15,921	39.78
Liberal	12,507	31.25
Conservative	8,868	22.16
People's	1,353	3.38
Green	1,168	2.92
Others	210	0.52

== See also ==
- 2025 Canadian federal election in British Columbia
- Carleton in the 2025 Canadian federal election
- Terrebonne in the 2025 Canadian federal election
- 2026 New Democratic Party leadership election
