= 2021 Canadian federal election in British Columbia =

← 2019	September 20, 2021	2025 →

All 42 British Columbian seats in the House of Commons
- Registered: 3,713,048
- Turnout: 2,279,961 (61.4%)
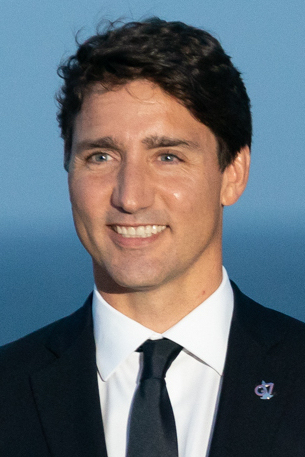

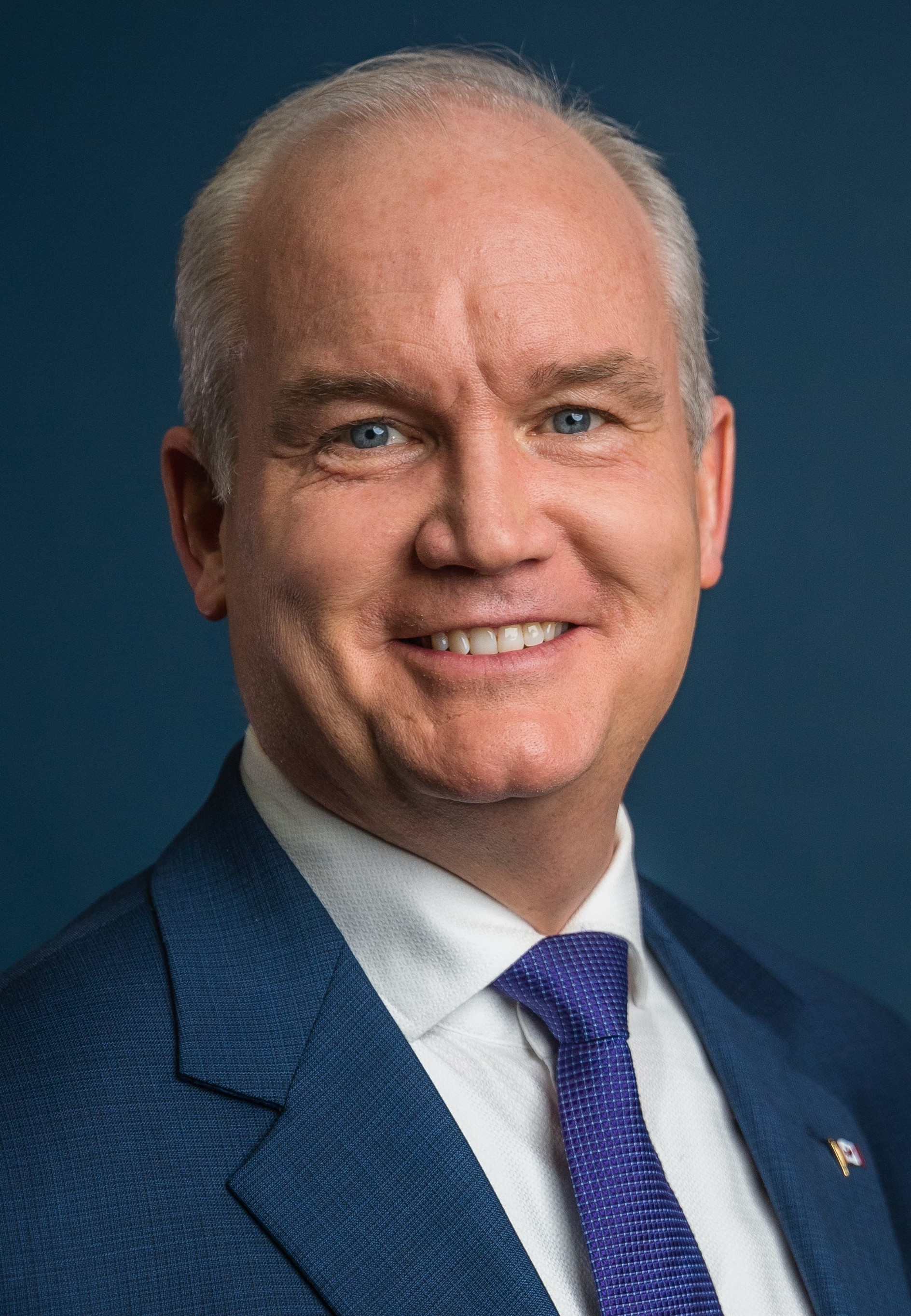

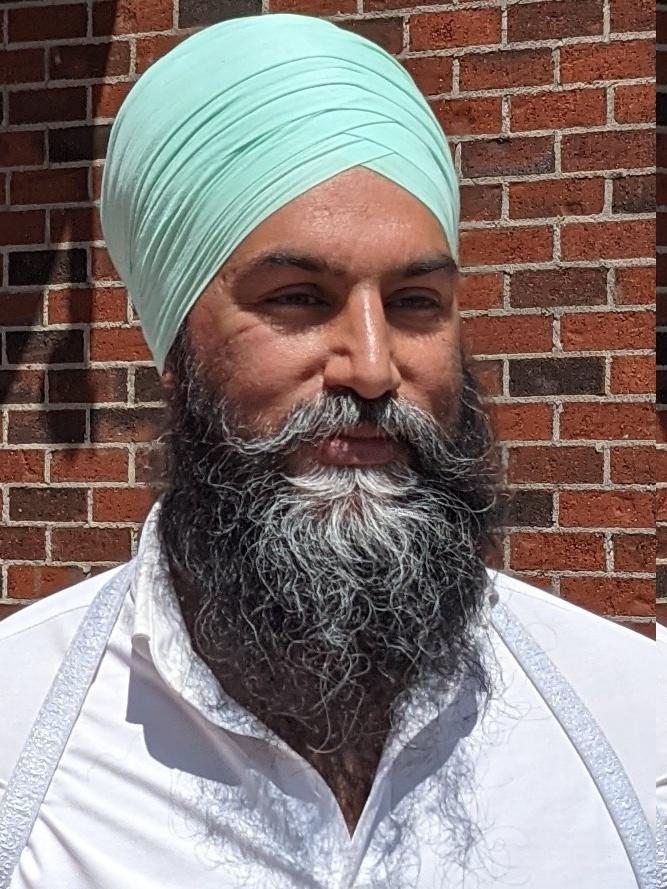

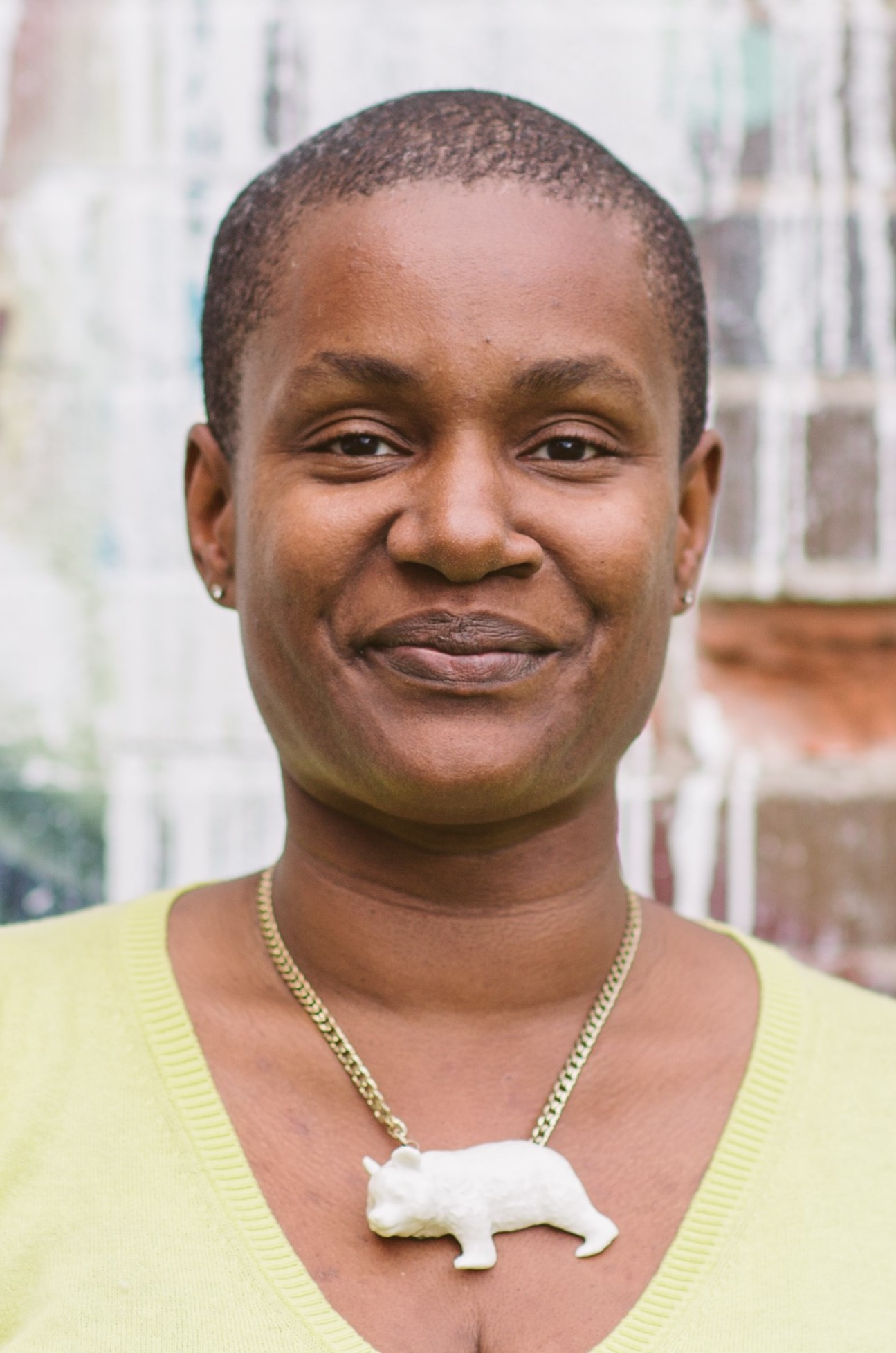

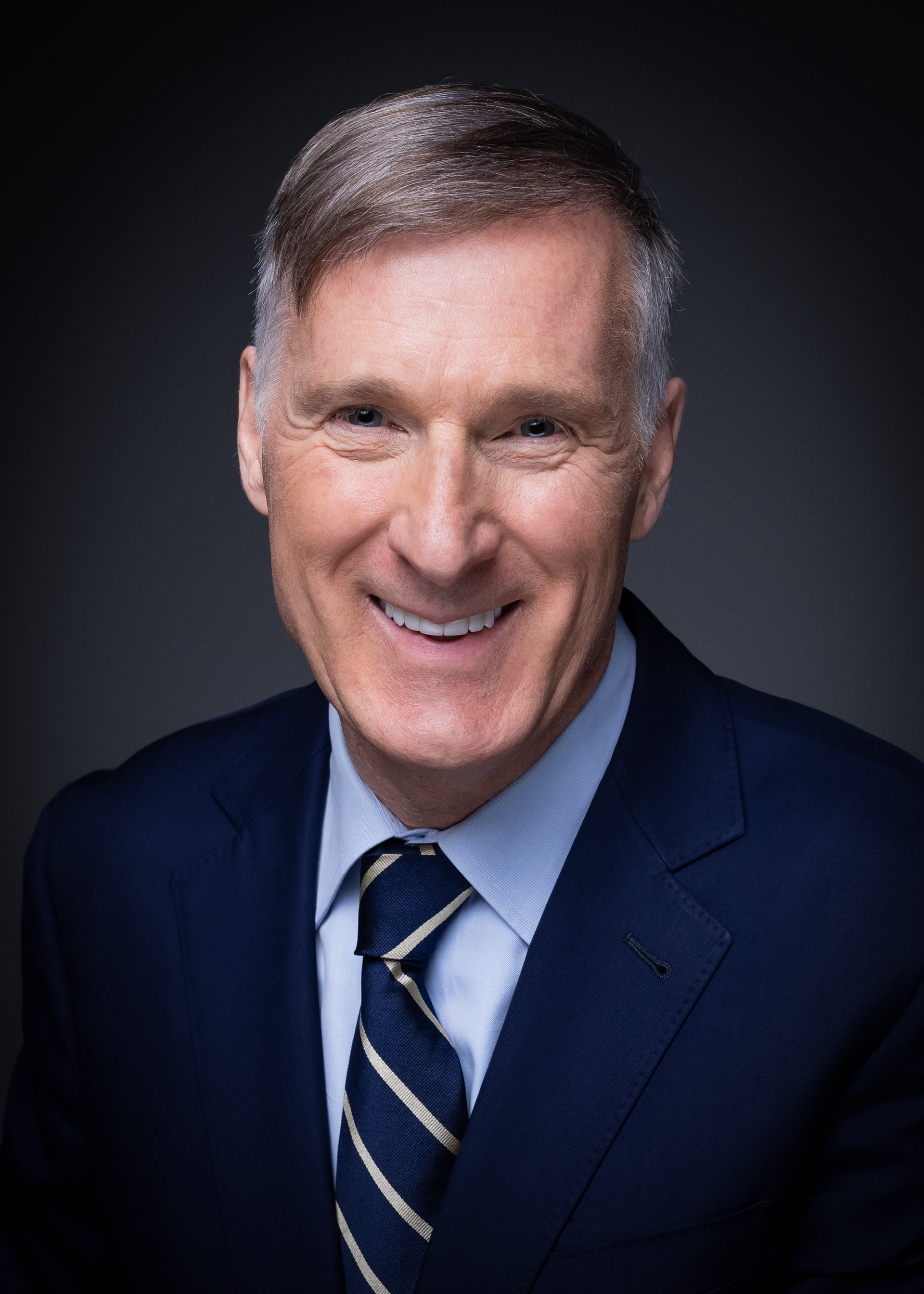
	First party	Second party	Third party
Leader	Justin Trudeau	Erin O'Toole	Jagmeet Singh
Party	Liberal	Conservative	New Democratic
Leader since	April 14, 2013	August 24, 2020	October 1, 2017
Last election	11 seats, 26.2%	17 seats, 34.0%	11 seats, 24.4%
Seats before	11	17	11
Seats won	15	13	13
Seat change	▲4	▼4	▲2
Popular vote	608,588	750,394	664,054
Percentage	26.9	33.1	29.3
Swing	▲0.7pp	▼0.9pp	▲4.9pp
	Fourth party	Fifth party
Leader	Annamie Paul	Maxime Bernier
Party	Green	People's
Leader since	October 3, 2020	September 14, 2018
Last election	2 seats, 12.5%	0 seats, 1.7%
Seats before	2	0
Seats won	1	0
Seat change	▼1	0
Popular vote	121,919	110,523
Percentage	5.4	4.9
Swing	▼7.1pp	▲3.2pp
Prime Minister before election
Justin Trudeau
Liberal
Elected Prime Minister
Justin Trudeau
Liberal

In the 2021 Canadian federal election, 42 members of parliament were elected to the House of Commons from the province of British Columbia (12.4% of all members). British Columbia had a voter turnout of 61.4% with 2,279,961 ballots cast, making up 13.2% of the total national voter turnout.

== Results ==
=== Summary ===
The Liberal Party managed to win the most seats, taking 15 ridings, a gain of 4 seats from the last election. Despite this they came in third place in the popular vote, with 26.2%. The Conservative Party won the popular vote, with 33.1%, a slight reduction compared to 2019. They won 13 seats, a loss of 4 from the last election. The NDP increased their votes and seat count. Coming in second with the popular vote, with 29.3%, and winning 13 seats, a tie with the Conservatives and a gain of 2 from 2019.

The Green party lost half their seats, being reduced to one. Their popular vote fell to 5.4%. The People's Party still won no seats, but grew their support to 4.9% of the vote.

Independent Jody Wilson Raybold did not run for re-election and her seat was won by the Liberals.

The Animal Protection Party, Canada's Fourth Front, the Christian Heritage Party, the Communist Party, the Libertarian Party, the Marxist-Leninist Party, the Maverick Party and the Rhino Party, all ran at least one candidate in British Columbia in this election.

Party	Votes	Vote %	Vote +/-	Seats	Seat +/-
Liberal	608,588	26.9%	▲0.7pp	15 / 42 (36%)	▲4
Conservative	750,394	33.1%	▼0.9pp	13 / 42 (31%)	▼4
New Democratic	664,054	29.3%	▲4.9pp	13 / 42 (31%)	▲2
Green	121,919	5.4%	▼7.1pp	1 / 42 (2%)	▼1
People's	110,523	4.9%	▲3.2pp	0 / 42 (0%)	0
Other	6,668	0.3%	0.0pp	0 / 42 (0%)	0
Independent	2,439	0.1%	▼0.8pp	0 / 42 (0%)	▼1
Total	2,264,585	100%	–	42 / 42 (100%)	–
Seat apportionment diagram:

=== Comparison with national results ===
Turnout and participation
Statistic	BC	Natl.	%
Population	4,648,055	35,151,728	13.22
Electors	3,713,048	27,509,496	13.50
Valid ballots	2,264,585	17,034,243	13.29
Rejected ballots	15,376	175,568	8.76
Total ballots	2,279,961	17,209,811	13.23
Statistic	BC	Natl. avg.	diff.
Valid ballot %	99.3	99.0	+0.3
Rejected ballot %	0.7	1.0	−0.3
Voter turnout %	61.4	62.6	−1.2

Results by party
Party	Popular vote %			Seats in caucus
Party	BC	Natl. avg.	diff.	Seats in caucus
Liberal	26.87	32.62	−5.75	15 / 160 (9%)
Conservative	33.14	33.74	−0.60	13 / 119 (11%)
New Democratic	29.32	17.82	+11.50	13 / 25 (52%)
Green	5.38	2.33	+3.05	1 / 2 (50%)
People's	4.88	4.94	−0.06	no caucus
Independent	0.11	0.19	−0.08	no caucus (Note: Independent MPs do not form a caucus.)

=== Synopsis by riding ===
Results by riding in British Columbia - 2021 Canadian federal election
Riding	2019	Winning party					Turnout (Note: Including spoilt ballots)	Votes (Note: Minor political parties receiving less than 1% of the national popular vote are aggregated under "Other"; independent candidates are aggregated separately.)							
Riding	2019	Party	Votes	Share	Margin #	Margin %	Turnout	Lib	Con	NDP	Green	PPC	Ind	Other	Total
Abbotsford	Con	Con	21,597	47.9%	10,690	23.7%	59.6%	10,907	21,597	7,729	1,517	3,300	–	–	45,050
Burnaby North—Seymour	Lib	Lib	19,445	39.5%	5,127	10.4%	62.3%	19,445	12,535	14,318	1,516	1,370	–	–	49,184
Burnaby South	NDP	NDP	16,382	40.3%	4,021	9.9%	51.1%	12,361	9,104	16,382	1,175	1,290	296	–	40,608
Cariboo—Prince George	Con	Con	25,771	50.8%	15,448	30.4%	59.8%	8,397	25,771	10,323	1,844	4,160	–	218	50,713
Central Okanagan—Similkameen—Nicola	Con	Con	30,563	47.6%	16,750	26.1%	64.6%	13,291	30,563	13,813	1,755	4,788	–	–	64,210
Chilliwack—Hope	Con	Con	23,987	46.0%	10,060	19.3%	61.4%	8,851	23,987	13,927	1,391	4,004	–	–	52,160
Cloverdale—Langley City	Con	Lib	20,877	39.2%	1,654	3.1%	61.0%	20,877	19,223	10,587	–	2,563	–	–	53,250
Coquitlam—Port Coquitlam	Lib	Lib	21,454	38.5%	4,547	8.2%	60.1%	21,454	16,907	14,982	–	2,373	–	–	55,716
Courtenay—Alberni	NDP	NDP	30,612	44.2%	8,431	12.2%	65.8%	9,276	22,181	30,612	3,590	3,467	–	124	69,250
Cowichan—Malahat—Langford	NDP	NDP	26,968	42.8%	9,098	14.4%	64.4%	10,320	17,870	26,968	3,922	3,952	–	–	63,032
Delta	Lib	Lib	22,105	42.3%	4,410	8.5%	67.5%	22,105	17,695	9,591	1,244	1,291	379	–	52,305
Esquimalt—Saanich—Sooke	NDP	NDP	28,056	42.8%	13,590	20.7%	64.4%	14,466	13,885	28,056	5,891	2,995	–	249	65,542
Fleetwood—Port Kells	Lib	Lib	21,350	45.2%	6,797	14.4%	58.7%	21,350	14,553	8,960	892	1,284	146	–	47,185
Kamloops—Thompson—Cariboo	Con	Con	30,281	43.0%	9,850	14.0%	66.5%	12,717	30,281	20,431	2,576	4,033	410	–	70,448
Kelowna—Lake Country	Con	Con	30,409	45.3%	12,642	18.8%	63.9%	17,767	30,409	12,204	2,074	4,688	–	–	67,142
Kootenay—Columbia	Con	Con	28,056	43.2%	4,070	6.3%	68.3%	5,879	28,056	23,986	2,577	4,467	–	–	64,965
Langley—Aldergrove	Con	Con	28,643	45.7%	12,078	19.3%	65.0%	16,565	28,643	12,288	1,798	3,341	–	–	62,635
Mission—Matsqui—Fraser Canyon	Con	Con	18,908	43.8%	8,310	19.3%	61.5%	10,598	18,908	8,709	1,887	3,073	–	–	43,175
Nanaimo—Ladysmith	Grn	NDP	19,826	28.8%	1,199	1.7%	64.0%	9,314	18,627	19,826	17,640	3,358	–	–	68,765
New Westminster—Burnaby	NDP	NDP	24,054	48.8%	12,369	25.1%	57.1%	11,685	9,710	24,054	2,035	1,840	–	–	49,324
North Island—Powell River	NDP	NDP	23,833	39.5%	2,163	3.5%	65.4%	7,922	21,670	23,833	3,656	2,795	–	387	60,263
North Okanagan—Shuswap	Con	Con	33,626	46.4%	19,697	27.2%	65.2%	13,666	33,626	13,929	3,967	7,209	–	–	72,397
North Vancouver	Lib	Lib	26,756	45.1%	10,085	17.0%	66.1%	26,756	16,671	11,750	2,598	1,545	–	–	59,320
Pitt Meadows—Maple Ridge	Con	Con	19,371	36.7%	2,502	4.8%	64.4%	13,179	19,371	16,869	–	2,800	453	161	52,833
Port Moody—Coquitlam	Con	NDP	19,367	37.2%	2,762	5.3%	62.7%	14,231	16,605	19,367	–	1,766	–	122	52,091
Prince George—Peace River—Northern Rockies	Con	Con	29,882	60.7%	23,235	47.2%	62.1 %	4,236	29,882	6,647	1,661	5,138	–	1,633	49,197
Richmond Centre	Con	Lib	13,440	39.3%	772	2.2%	46.2%	13,440	12,668	6,196	1,109	748	–	–	34,161
Saanich—Gulf Islands	Grn	Grn	24,648	37.6%	9,873	15.1%	70.4%	12,056	14,775	11,959	24,648	1,943	–	141	65,522
Skeena—Bulkley Valley	NDP	NDP	15,921	42.6%	2,408	6.5%	55.7%	2,866	13,513	15,921	1,406	2,888	–	797	37,391
South Okanagan—West Kootenay	NDP	NDP	27,595	41.3%	3,920	5.8%	65.6%	8,159	23,675	27,595	2,485	4,866	–	–	66,780
South Surrey—White Rock	Con	Con	24,158	42.5%	1,992	3.5%	65.0%	22,166	24,158	8,395	–	2,186	–	–	56,905
Steveston—Richmond East	Con	Lib	16,543	42.5%	3,477	9.0%	52.8%	16,543	13,066	7,525	860	955	–	–	38,949
Surrey Centre	Lib	Lib	16,862	43.9%	6,235	16.2%	51.7%	16,862	8,094	10,627	838	1,539	–	426	38,386
Surrey—Newton	Lib	Lib	19,721	53.9%	10,185	27.9%	56.2%	19,721	5,758	9,536	–	967	628	–	36,610
Vancouver Centre	Lib	Lib	20,873	40.4%	5,004	9.7%	57.0%	20,873	11,162	15,869	2,030	1,683	–	–	51,617
Vancouver East	NDP	NDP	27,969	56.4%	18,172	36.6%	55.0%	9,797	5,399	27,969	3,826	1,382	–	1,218	49,591
Vancouver Granville	Ind	Lib	17,050	34.4%	431	0.9%	60.8%	17,050	13,280	16,619	1,434	1,177	–	–	49,560
Vancouver Kingsway	NDP	NDP	20,994	52.3%	9,972	24.9%	54.1%	11,022	5,456	20,994	1,575	868	–	243	40,158
Vancouver Quadra	Lib	Lib	20,814	43.6%	7,028	14.7%	63.5%	20,814	13,786	9,220	2,922	963	–	–	47,705
Vancouver South	Lib	Lib	19,910	49.4%	9,988	24.8%	54.8%	19,910	9,060	9,922	–	1,104	–	287	40,283
Victoria	NDP	NDP	29,301	43.9%	11,107	16.6%	67.3%	18,194	9,152	29,301	7,472	2,065	–	564	66,748
West Vancouver—Sunshine Coast—Sea to Sky Country	Lib	Lib	21,500	33.9%	2,438	3.9%	64.9%	21,500	19,062	16,265	4,108	2,299	127	98	63,459

== Analysis and political significance ==
The incumbent Liberal Party won the most seats in the province, despite losing the popular vote to both the Conservatives and the New Democrats.

Despite winning the most seats in the province two years earlier, the Conservatives ultimately lost four of their seats in British Columbia to either the Liberals or New Democrats. Similar to the conservative British Columbia Liberal Party's recent losses in the 2020 British Columbia provincial election, the Conservatives lost support from urban and suburban voters in much of Greater Vancouver. It is also speculated that an increased vote share for the right-wing People's Party may have contributed to vote-splitting.

The Green Party saw a significant decrease in support in British Columbia, dropping from 12.5% in 2019 to 5.4%, and losing their Nanaimo—Ladysmith riding to the New Democrats. On Vancouver Island where the Greens are typically more competitive, they only managed to receive the most or second-most votes in one of the island's seven ridings.

== Student vote results ==
Student votes are mock elections that run parallel to actual elections, in which students not of voting age participate. They are administered by Student Vote Canada. These are for educational purposes and do not count towards the results.

Summary of the 2021 Canadian Student Vote in British Columbia
Party	Leader	Seats			Popular vote		
Party	Leader	Elected	%	Δ	Votes	%	Δ (pp)
New Democratic	Jagmeet Singh	31	73.81	▲6	49,126	34.76	▲5.17
Liberal	Justin Trudeau	6	14.29	▲6	29,400	20.80	▲4.29
Conservative	Erin O'Toole	4	9.52	▼5	28,730	20.33	▼0.61
Green	Annamie Paul	1	2.38	▼7	20,441	14.46	▼9.87
People's	Maxime Bernier	0	0	0	9,461	6.69	▲2.47
Other		0	0	0	4,189	2.96	▼1.46
Total		42	100.00	0	141,347	100.00	–
Source: Student Vote Canada

== See also ==
- Canadian federal election results in the British Columbia Interior
- Canadian federal election results in the Fraser Valley and the Southern Lower Mainland
- Canadian federal election results on Vancouver Island
- Canadian federal election results in Greater Vancouver and the Sunshine Coast
- 2020 British Columbia general election
