= 2025 Canadian federal election in British Columbia =

- April 28, 2025

All 43 British Columbian seats in the House of Commons
- Registered: 3,816,252
- Turnout: 2,638,307 (69.13%)
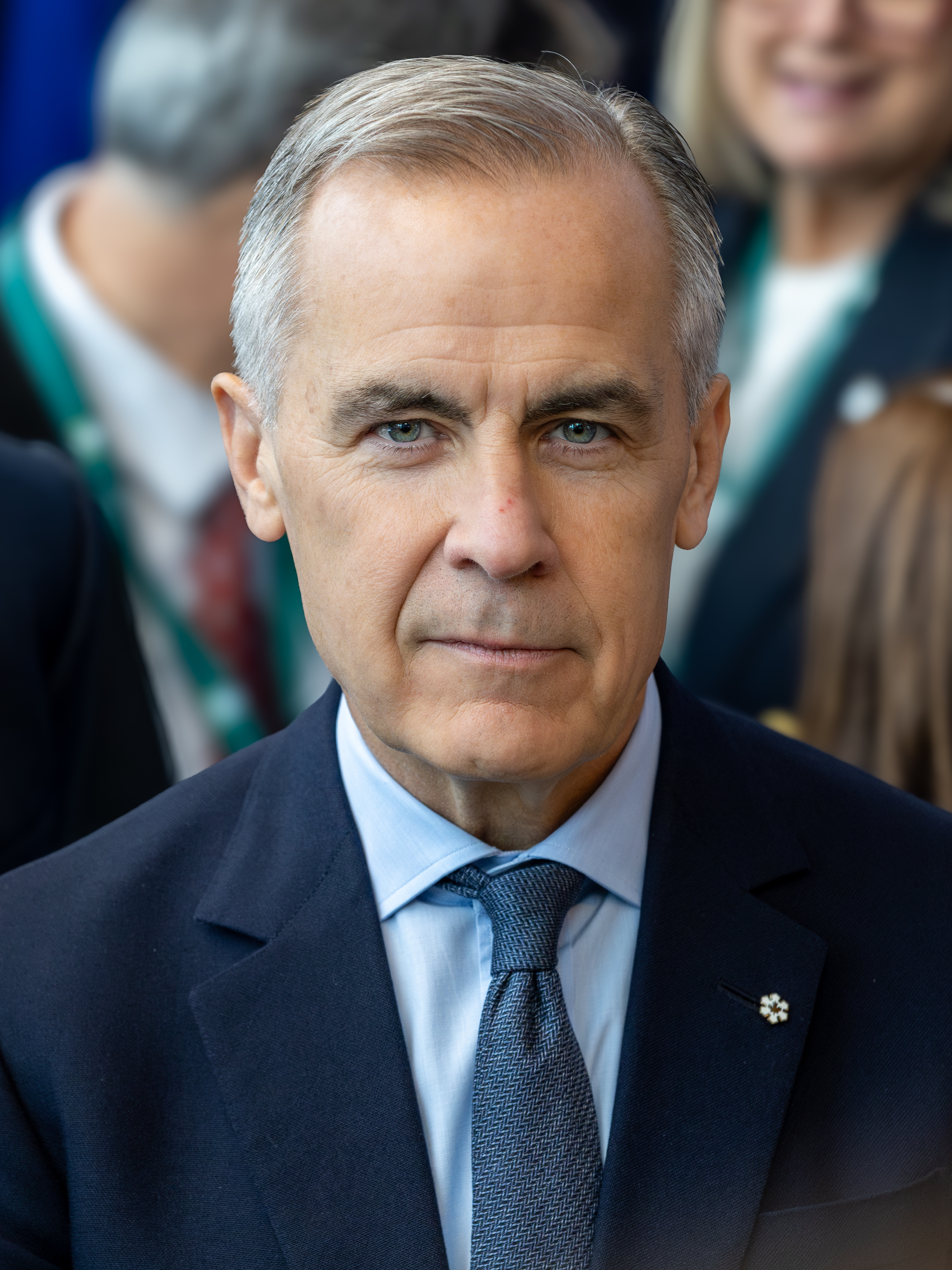

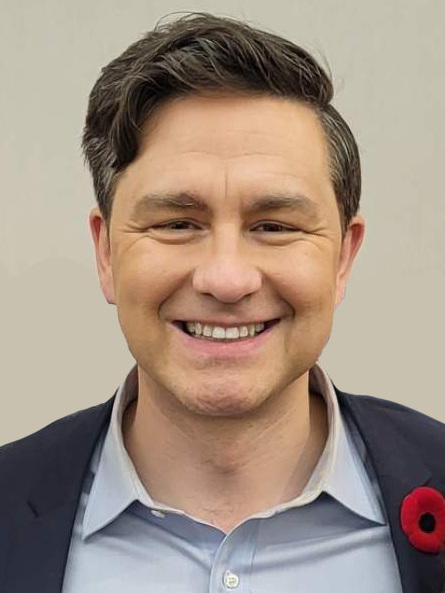

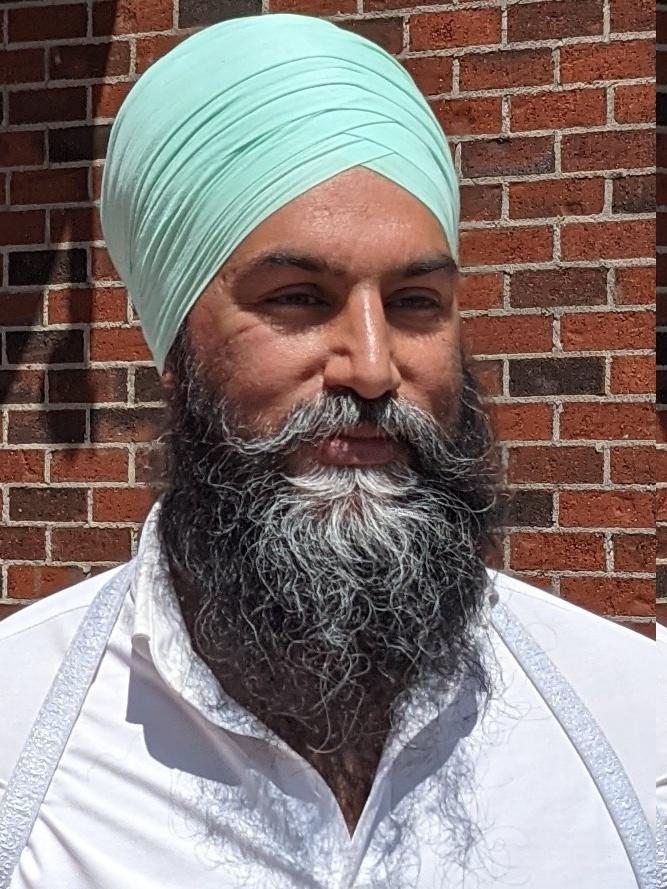

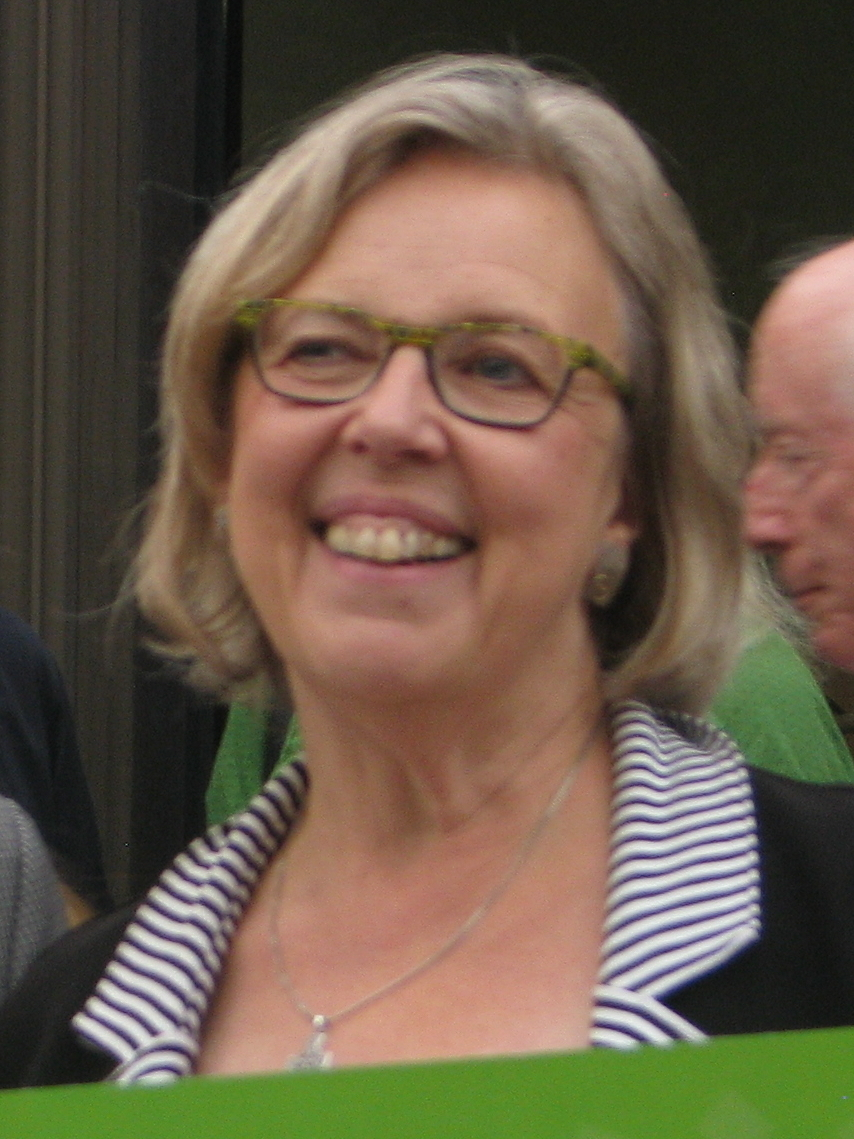

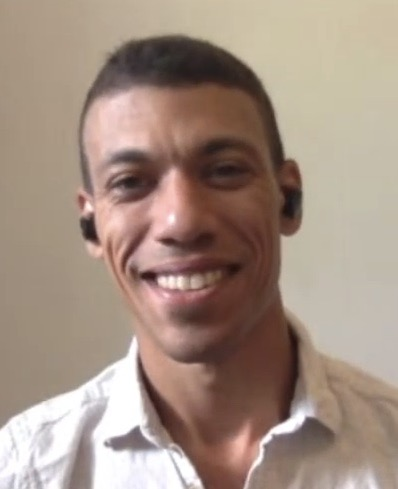
	First party	Second party
Leader	Mark Carney	Pierre Poilievre
Party	Liberal	Conservative
Leader since	March 9, 2025	September 10, 2022
Last election	15 seats, 27.0%	13 seats, 33.2%
Seats before	14	14
Seats won	20	19
Seat change	▲6	▲5
Popular vote	1,102,925	1,082,901
Percentage	41.8	41.1
Swing	▲14.9pp	▲8.0pp
	Third party	Fourth party
Leader	Jagmeet Singh	Elizabeth May & Jonathan Pedneault
Party	New Democratic	Green
Leader since	October 1, 2017	November 19, 2022 / February 4, 2025
Last election	13 seats, 29.2%	1 seat, 5.3%
Seats before	12	1
Seats won	3	1
Seat change	▼9	0
Popular vote	344,361	79,870
Percentage	13.1	3.0
Swing	▼16.2pp	▼2.4pp
Prime minister before election
Mark Carney
Liberal
Prime minister after election
Mark Carney
Liberal

In the 2025 Canadian federal election, there were 43 members of Parliament elected to the House of Commons from the province of British Columbia, making up 12.4% of all members of the House.

== Background ==
=== 2022 electoral redistribution ===
The 2025 Canadian federal election was the first election to utilize the electoral districts established following the 2022 Canadian federal electoral redistribution. The House of Commons increased from 338 seats to 343 seats, with British Columbia gaining 1 seat in an increase from 42 to 43. This made the average population per constituency in British Columbia 116,300 (according to the 2021 Canadian census), which was 8,452 more people per electoral district than the national average.

2021 results transposed onto 2023 boundaries
Party	MPs		
Party	2021 actual result	2021 notional result	Change
Liberal	15	15	0
Conservative	13	14	▲1
New Democratic	13	13	0
Green	1	1	0
Total seats	42	43	1 ▲

=== Timeline ===
Changes in British Columbian seats held (2021–2025)
Seat	Before				Change		
Seat	Date	Member	Party	Reason	Date	Member	Party
Cloverdale—Langley City	May 27, 2024	John Aldag	█ Liberal	Resigned to run as the BC NDP candidate for Langley-Abbotsford in the 2024 BC general election	December 16, 2024	Tamara Jansen	█ Conservative
Esquimalt—Saanich—Sooke	January 30, 2025	Randall Garrison	█ New Democratic	Resigned seat	n/a (Note: By-elections are not scheduled to fill vancancies within 9 months of a fixed general election date.)	–	█ Vacant

=== Opinion polling ===
Polling firm	Last date of polling	Link	LPC	CPC	NDP	GPC	PPC	Others	Margin of error (Note: In cases when linked poll details distinguish between the margin of error associated with the total sample of respondents (including undecided and non-voters) and that of the subsample of decided/leaning voters, the former is included in the table. Also not included is the margin of error created by rounding to the nearest whole number or any margin of error from methodological sources. Most online polls (because of their opt-in method of recruiting panelists which results in a non-random sample) cannot have a margin of error. In such cases, shown is what the margin of error would be for a survey using a random probability-based sample of equivalent size.)	Sample size (Note: Refers to the total, "raw" sample size, including undecided and non-voters, and before demographic weighting is applied. Fractions in parentheses apply to rolling polls (see below) and indicate the proportion of the sample that is independent from the previous poll in the series.)	Polling method (Note: "Telephone" refers to traditional telephone polls conducted by live interviewers; "IVR" refers to automated Interactive Voice Response polls conducted by telephone; "online" refers to polls conducted exclusively over the internet; "telephone/online" refers to polls which combine results from both telephone and online surveys, or for which respondents are initially recruited by telephone and then asked to complete an online survey. "Rolling" polls contain overlapping data from one poll to the next.)	Lead
Abacus Data	May 9, 2024		18	44	26	8	—N/a	3	± 3.1 pp	1,000	online	18
Mainstreet Research	April 24, 2024		17.8	55.8	15.8	6.9	—N/a	3.7	± 3.2 pp	962	Smart IVR	38
Mainstreet Research	March 19, 2024		22.8	49.6	19.4	5.8	—N/a	2.4	± 3 pp	1,063	Smart IVR	26.8
Angus Reid	March 6, 2024		21	40	29	9	—N/a	2	± 3 pp	809	online	11

== Predictions ==
=== Summary ===
Source	Ranking				
Source	Lib	Con	NDP	Green	As of
338Canada	21	19	3	0	23 April 2025

== Results ==
=== Summary ===
The Liberal Party won the most seats and votes, taking 20 ridings, a gain of 6 seats from dissolution and winning 41.8% of the popular vote. The Conservative Party came in a close second, with 19 seats, a gain of 5. They won 41.1% of the popular vote.

Support for the NDP dropped substantially, coming in third, with leader Jagmeet Singh losing his own seat of Burnaby Central. They received 13.1% of the popular vote, and won 3 seats, a loss of 9 since dissolution.

The Green party retained their 1 seat, with co-leader Elizabeth May being re-elected to a fourth term. Their popular vote fell to 3.0%. The People's Party still won no seats, and saw their support collapse to just 0.5% of the vote.

The Animal Protection Party, Canadian Future Party, the Christian Heritage Party, the Communist Party, the Libertarian Party, the Marxist-Leninist Party, the United Party of Canada and the Rhino Party, all ran at least one candidate in British Columbia and got a combined 0.2% of the vote.

Liberal support was strongest in Metro Vancouver (particularly north of the Fraser River) and in Greater Victoria, while the Conservatives dominated the rest of the province. The results for the Conservatives were very similar to the result for the BC Conservatives in the previous provincial election.

British Columbian summary seat results in the 2025 Canadian federal election
Party	Votes	Vote %	Vote +/-	Seats	Seat +/-
Liberal	1,102,925	41.8%	▲14.9pp	20 / 43 (47%)	▲6
Conservative	1,082,901	41.0%	▲8.0pp	19 / 43 (44%)	▲5
New Democratic	344,361	13.0%	▼16.2pp	3 / 43 (7%)	▼9
Green	79,870	3.0%	▼2.4pp	1 / 43 (2%)	0
People's	12,188	0.5%	▼4.4pp	0 / 43 (0%)	0
Independent	11,747	0.4%	▲0.3pp	0 / 43 (0%)	0
Other	4,315	0.2%	▲0.1pp	0 / 43 (0%)	0
Total	2,638,307	100%	–	43 / 43 (100%)	▲2 (Note: British Columbia gained 1 seat in the electoral redistribution. 1 seat was vacant at the dissolution of Parliament.)
Seat apportionment diagram:

=== Comparison with national results ===
Results by party
Party	Popular vote %			Seats in caucus
Party	BC	Natl.	diff.	Seats in caucus
Liberal	41.8	43.7	-1.9	20 / 169 (12%)
Conservative	41.0	41.3	-0.3	19 / 144 (13%)
New Democratic	13.0	6.3	+6.7	3 / 7 (43%)
Green	3.0	1.2	+1.8	1 / 1 (100%)
People's	0.5	0.7	-0.2	no caucus
Total	–	–	–	43 / 343 (13%)

== Student vote results ==
Student votes are mock elections that run parallel to actual elections, in which students not of voting age participate. They are administered by Student Vote Canada. These are for educational purposes and do not count towards the results.

Summary of the 2025 Canadian Student Vote in British Columbia
Party	Leader	Seats			Popular vote		
Party	Leader	Elected	%	Δ	Votes	%	Δ (pp)
Conservative	Pierre Poilievre	29	67.44	▲25	54,521	36.27	▲15.94
Liberal	Mark Carney	9	20.93	▲3	42,217	28.08	▲7.28
New Democratic	Jagmeet Singh	4	9.30	▼27	27,173	18.08	▼16.68
Green	Elizabeth May & Jonathan Pedneault	1	2.33	0	16,811	11.18	▼3.28
People's	Maxime Bernier	0	0	0	5,022	3.34	▼3.35
Other		0	0	0	4,587	3.05	▲0.14
Total		43	100.00	▲1	112,331	100.00	–
Source: Student Vote Canada

== See also ==
- Canadian federal election results in the British Columbia Interior
- Canadian federal election results in the Fraser Valley and the Southern Lower Mainland
- Canadian federal election results on Vancouver Island
- Canadian federal election results in Greater Vancouver and the Sunshine Coast
- Burnaby Central in the 2025 Canadian federal election
- 2024 British Columbia general election
