= 2019 Canadian federal election in British Columbia =

- October 21, 2019

All 42 British Columbian seats in the House of Commons
- Registered: 3,641,258
- Turnout: 2,402,554 (66.0%)
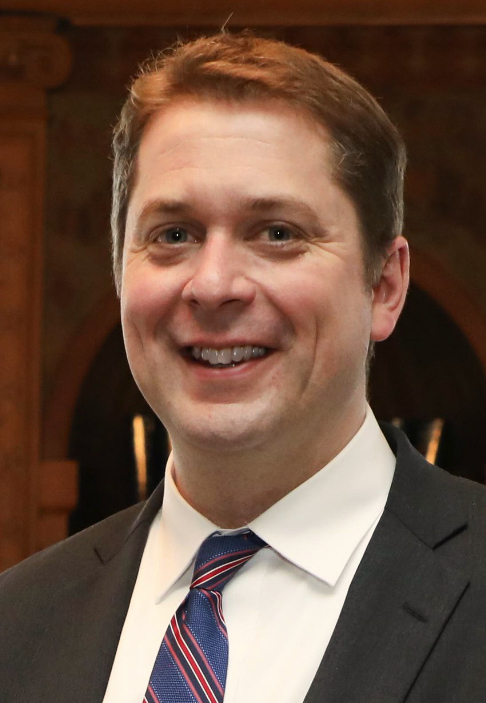

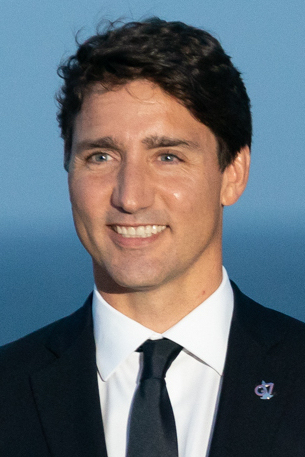

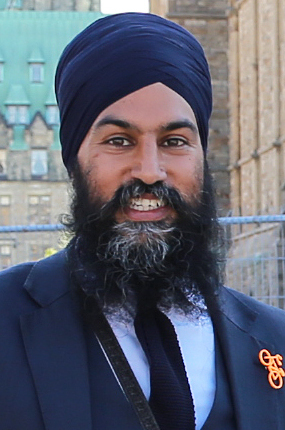

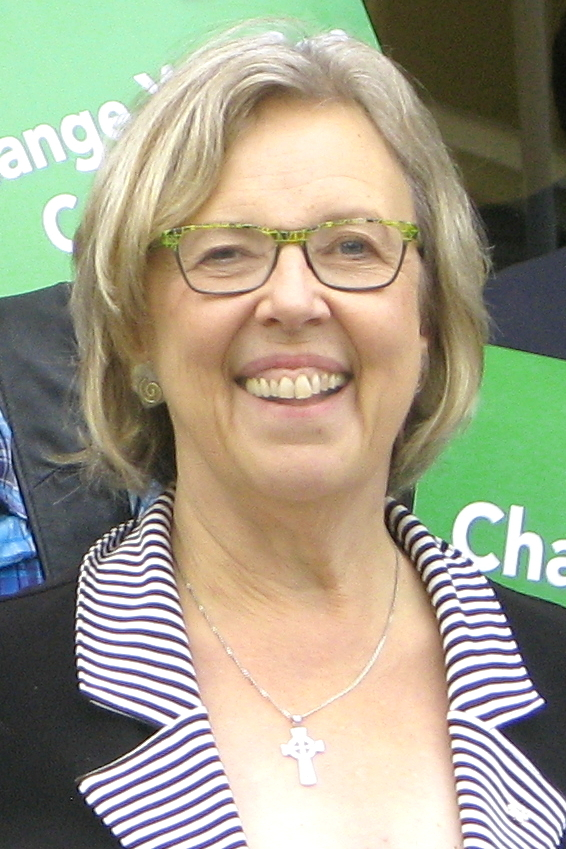

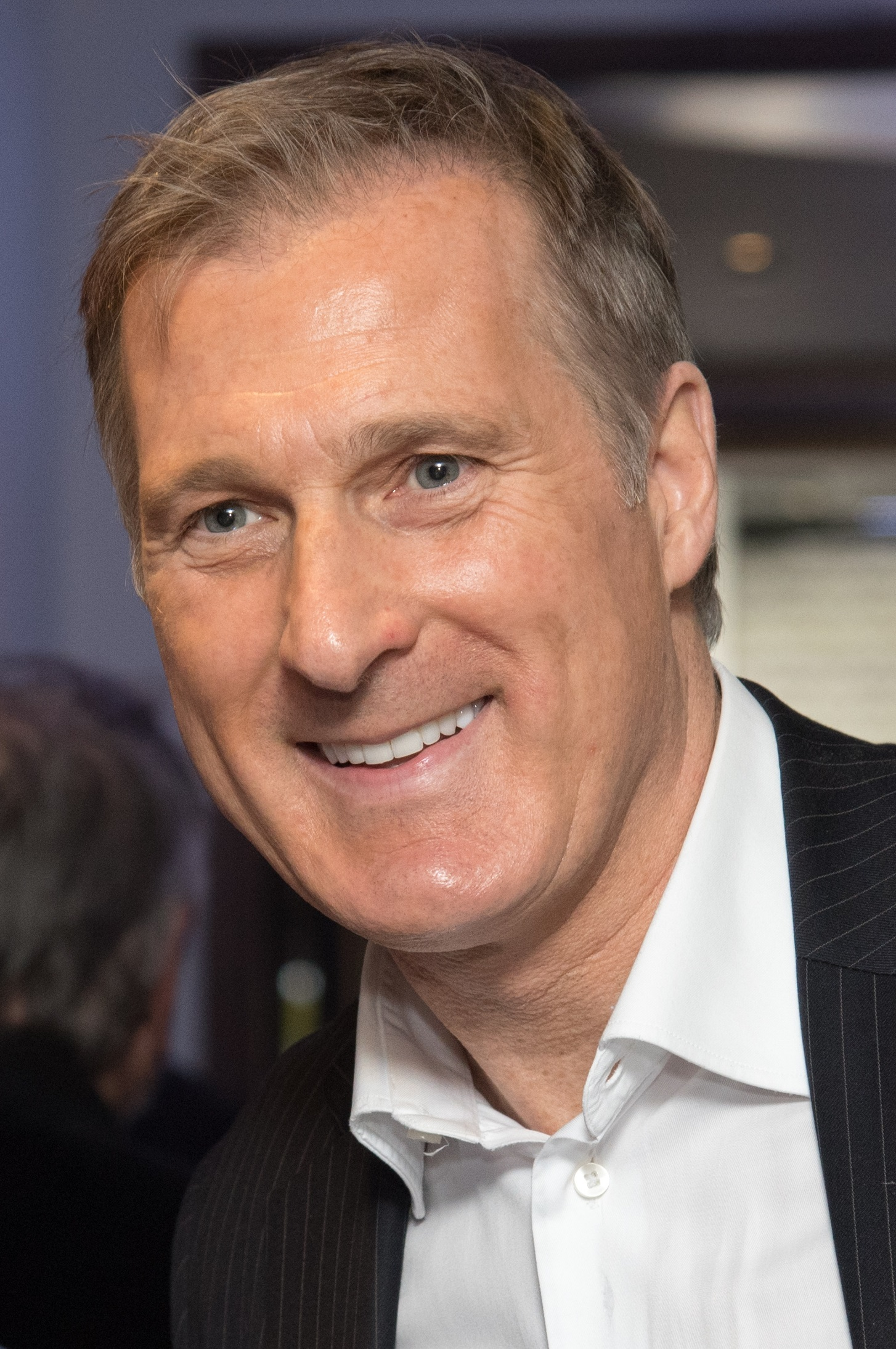
	First party	Second party	Third party
Leader	Andrew Scheer	Justin Trudeau	Jagmeet Singh
Party	Conservative	Liberal	New Democratic
Leader since	May 27, 2017	April 14, 2013	October 1, 2017
Last election	10 seats, 30.0%	17 seats, 35.2%	14 seats, 25.9%
Seats before	8	17	12
Seats won	17	11	11
Seat change	▲9	▼6	▼1
Popular vote	811,362	624,545	583,401
Percentage	34.0	26.2	24.4
Swing	▲4.0pp	▼9.0pp	▼1.5pp
	Fourth party	Fifth party
Leader	Elizabeth May	Maxime Bernier
Party	Green	People's
Leader since	August 27, 2006	September 14, 2018
Last election	1 seat, 8.2%	new party
Seats before	2	0
Seats won	2	0
Seat change	0	0
Popular vote	297,835	39,496
Percentage	12.5	1.7
Swing	▲4.3pp	new party
Prime Minister before election
Justin Trudeau
Liberal
Elected Prime Minister
Justin Trudeau
Liberal

In the 2019 Canadian federal election, 42 members of parliament were elected to the House of Commons from the province of British Columbia (12.4% of all members). British Columbia had a voter turnout of 66.0% with 2,402,554 ballots cast, making up 13.1% of the total national voter turnout.

Changes in British Columbian seats held (2015–2019)
Seat	Before				Change		
Seat	Date	Member	Party	Reason	Date	Member	Party
South Surrey—White Rock	September 29, 2017	Dianne Watts	█ Conservative	Resigned to seek the leadership of the British Columbia Liberal Party	December 11, 2017	Gordie Hogg	█ Liberal
Burnaby South	September 14, 2018	Kennedy Stewart	█ New Democratic	Resigned to run for Mayor of Vancouver in the 2018 Vancouver municipal election	February 25, 2019	Jagmeet Singh	█ New Democratic
Nanaimo—Ladysmith	January 2, 2019	Sheila Malcolmson	█ New Democratic	Resigned to enter provincial politics	May 6, 2019	Paul Manly	█ Green
Vancouver Granville	April 2, 2019	Jody Wilson-Raybould	█ Liberal	Removed from the Liberal caucus			█ Independent
Langley—Aldergrove	June 20, 2019	Mark Warawa	█ Conservative	Died of cancer			█ Vacant
Victoria	September 1, 2019	Murray Rankin	█ New Democratic	Resigned			█ Vacant

== Results ==
=== Summary ===
The Conservative Party won the most seats in British Columbia during the 2019 federal election, taking 17 ridings, a gain of 7 from the previous election, with 34.0% of the popular vote. The Liberal Party came in second in seat count, winning 11 ridings, a loss of 6, with 26.2% of the popular vote. The NDP had a small decline of support, winning 11 seats, a loss of 2, with 24.4% of the popular vote.

The Green Party won 2 seats, both on Vancouver Island, increasing their share of the popular vote to 12.5%. The People's Party did not win any seats, capturing 1.7% of the vote.

Independent Jody Wilson-Raybould successfully retained her seat in Vancouver Granville after leaving the Liberal Party. Smaller parties, including the Christian Heritage Party, the Communist Party, the Marxist-Leninist Party, the Libertarian Party, the Animal Protection Party, the Progressive Canadian Party, the Rhino Party, and the Veterans Coalition Party, ran candidates in BC but didn't win any seats.

Party	Votes	Vote %	Vote +/-	Seats	Seat +/-
Conservative	811,362	34.0%	▲4.0pp	17 / 42 (40%)	▲9
Liberal	624,545	26.2%	▼9.0pp	11 / 42 (26%)	▼6
New Democratic	583,401	24.4%	▼1.5pp	11 / 42 (26%)	▼1
Green	297,835	12.5%	▲4.3pp	2 / 42 (5%)	0
People's	39,496	1.7%	n/a	0 / 42 (0%)	n/a
Independent	22,495	0.9%	▲0.2pp	1 / 42 (2%)	0
Other	8,295	0.3%	no data	0 / 42 (0%)	0
Total	2,387,429	100%	–	42 / 42 (100%)	▲2 (Note: Two seats were vacant when the 42nd Canadian Parliament was dissolved.)
Seat apportionment diagram:

=== Full results ===
Full results of 2019 Canadian federal election in British Columbia– Elections Canada
Party	Party leader	Candidates	Seats					Popular vote					
Party	Party leader	Candidates	2015	Dissol.	2019	% change from dissolution	% seats	Votes	Vote change	%	pp change	% where running	
Liberal	Justin Trudeau	42	17	17	11	−%	26.19%	624,545	−	26.2%	−pp	26.2%	
Conservative	Andrew Scheer	42 (Note: Includes Heather Leung in Burnaby North-Seymour, who was ejected from the Conservative Party after candidate registration was closed.)	10	8	18	+%	40%	811,362	+	34%	+pp	34%	
New Democratic	Jagmeet Singh	42	14	13	11	−%	26.19%	583,401	−	24.4%	−pp	24.4%	
Green	Elizabeth May	42	1	2	2	+%	4.2%	297,835	+	12.5%	+pp	12.5%	
Independent and No Affiliation		19	0	1	1		2.4%	22,495	+	0.9%	+pp	%	
People's	Maxime Bernier	42	—N/a	1	0	−%	0.00%	39,496	*	1.7%	*	1.70%	
Libertarian	Tim Moen	7	0	0	0			2,712	−	0.1%	−pp	%	
Christian Heritage	Rod Taylor	5	0	0	0			2,402	+	0.10%	+pp	%	
Communist	Elizabeth Rowley	7	0	0	0			1,061	−	0.05%	–	%	
Animal Alliance	Liz White	3	0	0	0			881	+	0.01%	+pp	0.42%	
Marxist–Leninist	Anna Di Carlo	9	0	0	0			715	−	0.01%	−pp	%	
Progressive Canadian	Joe Hueglin	1	0	0	0			207	−	>0.01%	−pp	0.29%	
Rhinoceros	Sébastien CoRhino	1	0	0	0			173	+	>0.01%	+pp	0.27%	
Veterans Coalition	Randy David Joy	2	—N/a	0	0			144	*	>0.01%	*	0.115%	—N/a
Vacant				1	—N/a								
Total valid votes		—	—	—	—	—	—	2,387,429	+	100.00%	—	—	
Blank and invalid votes		—	—	—	—	—	—		+	%	+pp	—	
Total		264	42	42	42	—	100.00%		+	100.00%	—	100.00%	
Registered voters/turnout		—	—	—	—	—	—	3,641,258	+	66.0%	−pp	—	
Source: Elections Canada (Official Voting Results)

== Comparison with national results ==
Results by party
Party	Popular vote %			Seats in caucus
Party	BC	Natl. avg.	diff.	Seats in caucus
Conservative	34.0	34.3	−0.3	17 / 121 (14%)
Liberal	26.2	33.1	−6.9	11 / 157 (7%)
New Democratic	24.4	16.0	+8.4	11 / 24 (46%)
Green	12.5	6.5	+6.0	2 / 3 (67%)
People's	1.7	1.6	+0.1	no caucus
Independent	0.9	0.4	+0.5	no caucus

== Synopsis by riding ==
Results by riding in British Columbia - 2019 Canadian federal election
Riding	2015	Winning party					Turnout (Note: Including spoilt ballots)	Votes (Note: Minor political parties receiving less than 1% of the national popular vote are aggregated under "Other"; independent candidates are aggregated separately.)							
Riding	2015	Party	Votes	Share	Margin #	Margin %	Turnout	Lib	Con	NDP	Green	PPC	Ind	Other	Total
Abbotsford	Con	Con	25,162	51.4%	14,602	29.8%	65.9%	10,560	25,162	8,257	3,702	985	–	270	48,936
Burnaby North—Seymour	Lib	Lib	17,770	35.5%	1,585	3.2%	65.4%	17,770	9,734	16,185	4,801	1,079	271	219	50,059
Burnaby South	NDP	NDP	16,956	37.7%	3,042	6.8%	56.9%	10,706	13,914	16,956	2,477	645	–	308	45,006
Cariboo—Prince George	Con	Con	28,848	52.7%	17,916	32.7%	65.5%	10,932	28,848	8,440	4,998	1,206	350	–	54,774
Central Okanagan—Similkameen—Nicola	Con	Con	31,135	47.9%	14,883	22.9%	69.2%	16,252	31,135	10,904	5,086	1,345	–	213	64,935
Chilliwack—Hope	Con	Con	26,672	49.6%	15,824	29.4%	65.7%	10,848	26,672	8,957	5,243	1,760	–	275	53,755
Cloverdale—Langley City	Lib	Con	20,936	37.7%	1,394	2.5%	65.0%	19,542	20,936	10,508	3,572	930	–	–	55,488
Coquitlam—Port Coquitlam	Lib	Lib	20,178	34.7%	390	0.7%	63.7%	20,178	19,788	13,383	4,025	703	–	98	58,175
Courtenay—Alberni	NDP	NDP	29,790	41.2%	5,854	8.1%	72.3%	8,620	23,936	29,790	9,762	–	–	172	72,280
Cowichan—Malahat—Langford	NDP	NDP	23,519	36.1%	6,560	10.1%	70.7%	10,301	16,959	23,519	13,181	1,066	–	202	65,228
Delta	Lib	Lib	22,257	41.2%	4,448	8.2%	70.7%	22,257	17,809	8,792	3,387	948	783	–	53,976
Esquimalt—Saanich—Sooke	NDP	NDP	23,887	34.1%	5,381	7.7%	70.9%	12,554	13,409	23,887	18,506	1,089	282	398	70,125
Fleetwood—Port Kells	Lib	Lib	18,545	37.7%	1,899	3.9%	61.5%	18,401	16,518	10,533	2,360	1,093	–	–	48,905
Kamloops—Thompson—Cariboo	Con	Con	32,415	44.7%	12,699	17.5%	70.8%	19,716	32,415	9,936	8,789	1,132	–	465	72,453
Kelowna—Lake Country	Lib	Con	31,497	45.6%	8,870	12.8%	69.4%	22,627	31,497	8,381	5,171	1,225	219	–	69,120
Kootenay—Columbia	NDP	Con	30,168	44.8%	7,019	10.4%	73.8%	6,151	30,168	23,149	6,145	1,378	–	339	67,330
Langley—Aldergrove	Con (Note: Vacant at dissolution)	Con	29,823	47.0%	13,569	21.4%	68.9%	16,254	29,823	10,690	4,881	1,305	–	499	63,452
Mission—Matsqui—Fraser Canyon	Lib	Con	19,535	42.4%	7,236	15.7%	67.2%	12,299	19,535	8,089	5,019	1,055	–	69	46,066
Nanaimo—Ladysmith	NDP (Note: Held by the Greens at dissolution)	Grn	24,844	34.6%	6,210	8.6%	69.5%	9,735	18,634	16,985	24,844	1,049	306	311	71,864
New Westminster—Burnaby	NDP	NDP	23,437	44.2%	11,023	20.8%	62.3%	12,414	11,439	23,437	4,378	862	83	364	52,977
North Island—Powell River	NDP	NDP	23,834	37.9%	3,332	5.3%	70.6%	8,251	20,502	23,834	8,891	1,102	287	48	62,915
North Okanagan—Shuswap	Con	Con	36,154	48.8%	19,371	26.1%	70.0%	16,783	36,154	11,353	7,828	2,027	–	–	74,145
North Vancouver	Lib	Lib	26,979	42.9%	10,071	16.0%	71.7%	26,979	16,908	10,340	7,868	835	–	–	62,930
Pitt Meadows—Maple Ridge	Lib	Con	19,650	36.2%	3,525	6.5%	68.2%	16,125	19,650	12,958	4,332	698	468	–	54,231
Port Moody—Coquitlam	NDP	Con	16,855	31.2%	153	0.3%	66.4%	15,695	16,855	16,702	3,873	821	–	57	54,003
Prince George—Peace River—Northern Rockies	Con	Con	38,473	69.8%	32,082	58.2%	69.8%	6,391	38,473	5,069	3,448	1,748	–	–	55,129
Richmond Centre	Con	Con	19,037	49.0%	7,985	20.6%	53.4%	11,052	19,037	5,617	2,376	538	197	–	38,817
Saanich—Gulf Islands	Grn	Grn	33,454	49.1%	19,670	28.9%	75.5%	11,326	13,784	8,657	33,454	929	–	–	68,150
Skeena—Bulkley Valley	NDP	NDP	16,944	40.9%	3,188	7.7%	62.7%	4,793	13,756	16,944	3,280	940	321	1,350	41,384
South Okanagan—West Kootenay	NDP	NDP	24,809	36.4%	796	1.2%	69.6%	11,705	24,013	24,809	5,672	1,638	359	–	68,196
South Surrey—White Rock	Con (Note: Held by the Liberals at dissolution)	Con	24,310	41.9%	2,618	4.5%	69.6%	21,692	24,310	6,716	4,458	852	–	–	58,028
Steveston—Richmond East	Lib	Con	17,478	41.7%	2,747	6.5%	57.4%	14,731	17,478	6,321	2,972	–	449	–	41,951
Surrey Centre	Lib	Lib	15,453	37.4%	4,100	9.9%	54.9%	15,453	10,505	11,353	2,558	709	243	498	41,319
Surrey—Newton	Lib	Lib	18,960	45.0%	6,654	15.8%	63.4%	18,960	8,824	12,306	1,355	653	–	–	42,098
Vancouver Centre	Lib	Lib	23,599	42.2%	10,319	18.4%	61.5%	23,599	10,782	13,280	7,002	724	180	379	55,946
Vancouver East	NDP	NDP	29,236	52.6%	19,151	34.4%	61.1%	10,085	6,724	29,236	8,062	679	–	825	55,611
Vancouver Granville	Lib (Note: Held by an independent MP at dissolution)	Ind	17,265	32.6%	3,177	6.0%	65.0%	14,088	11,605	6,960	2,683	431	17,265	–	53,032
Vancouver Kingsway	NDP	NDP	21,680	49.1%	11,486	26.0%	59.4%	10,194	8,804	21,680	2,675	427	–	91	44,163
Vancouver Quadra	Lib	Lib	22,093	43.5%	8,011	15.8%	68.0%	22,093	14,082	7,681	6,308	428	162	–	50,754
Vancouver South	Lib	Lib	17,808	41.2%	3,420	7.9%	58.9%	17,808	14,388	8,015	2,451	532	–	–	43,194
Victoria	NDP	NDP	23,765	33.2%	2,382	3.3%	73.5%	15,952	9,038	23,765	21,383	920	111	380	71,549
West Vancouver—Sunshine Coast—Sea to Sky Country	Lib	Lib	22,673	34.9%	5,314	8.2%	69.1%	22,673	17,359	9,027	14,579	1,010	159	173	64,980

== See also ==
- Canadian federal election results in the British Columbia Interior
- Canadian federal election results in the Fraser Valley and the Southern Lower Mainland
- Canadian federal election results on Vancouver Island
- Canadian federal election results in Greater Vancouver and the Sunshine Coast
