= Burnaby Central =

Federal electoral district in British Columbia, Canada

British Columbia electoral district
- Interactive map of riding boundaries from the 2025 federal election

Federal electoral district
- Legislature: House of Commons
MP
Wade Chang
Liberal
- District created: 2023
- First contested: 2025
- Last contested: 2025

Demographics
- Population (2021): 120,734
- Electors (2025): 82,794
- Area (km²): 38
- Pop. density (per km²): 3,177.2
- Census division: Metro Vancouver
- Census subdivision: Burnaby (part)

Burnaby Central is a federal electoral district in British Columbia, Canada. Its boundaries came into effect upon the call of the 2025 Canadian federal election.

== Geography ==
Under the 2022 Canadian federal electoral redistribution the riding replaced Burnaby South. Its differences from that riding are as follows:

- Gained the Sullivan Heights area as far west as Arden Avenue from Burnaby North—Seymour
- Gained the part of Burnaby west of Canada Way and north of the Kingsway from New Westminster—Burnaby
- Lost all of Burnaby south of both Imperial Street and Kingsway to Vancouver Fraserview—South Burnaby.

== Demographics ==
According to the 2021 Canadian census

Languages: 41.4% English, 14.5% Mandarin, 10.5% Cantonese, 3.8% Korean, 3.2% Tagalog, 2.7% Persian, 2.3% Spanish, 1.6% Punjabi, 1.5% Serbo-Croatian, 1.3% Portuguese, 1.3% Vietnamese, 1.3% Russian, 1.1% Hindi, 1.1% French

Religions: 48.1% No religion, 34.2% Christian (14.5% Catholic, 2.7% Christian Orthodox, 1.1% Anglican, 1.0% United Church, 14.8% Other), 6.9% Muslim, 3.8% Buddhist, 3.6% Hindu, 2.1% Sikh

Median income: $37,200 (2020)

Average income: $49,680 (2020)

Panethnic groups in Burnaby Central (2021)
Panethnic group	2021	
Panethnic group	Pop.	%
East Asian (Note: Statistic includes total responses of "Chinese", "Korean", and "Japanese" under visible minority section on census.)	47,525	39.6%
European (Note: Statistic includes all persons that did not make up part of a visible minority or an indigenous identity.)	32,760	27.3%
South Asian	11,660	9.72%
Southeast Asian (Note: Statistic includes total responses of "Filipino" and "Southeast Asian" under visible minority section on census.)	11,070	9.22%
Middle Eastern (Note: Statistic includes total responses of "West Asian" and "Arab" under visible minority section on census.)	5,235	4.36%
Latin American	3,275	2.73%
African	2,675	2.23%
Indigenous	2,010	1.67%
Other/multiracial (Note: Statistic includes total responses of "Visible minority, n.i.e." and "Multiple visible minorities" under visible minority section on census.)	3,805	3.17%
Total responses	120,020	99.39%
Total population	120,755	100%
Notes: Totals greater than 100% due to multiple origin responses. Demographics based on 2022 Canadian federal electoral redistribution riding boundaries.

== History ==
=== Members of Parliament ===
Parliament	Years	Member	Party
Burnaby Central; Riding created from Burnaby North—Seymour, Burnaby South, and New Westminster—Burnaby
45th	2025–present	Wade Chang	Liberal

== Electoral results ==
2025 general election

2025 Canadian federal election
Party	Candidate	Votes	%	±%	Expenditures
Liberal	Wade Chang	21,745	42.23	+10.98	
Conservative	James Yan	19,889	38.62	+16.46	
New Democratic	Jagmeet Singh	9,353	18.16	−21.62	
People's	Richard Farbridge	506	0.98	−2.40	
Total valid votes/expense limit		51,493	99.17		
Total rejected ballots		430	0.83		
Turnout		51,923	61.61		
Eligible voters		84,278			
Liberal notional gain from New Democratic		Swing		+16.30	
Source: Elections Canada
Note: number of eligible voters does not include voting day registrations.

Transposed result of the 2021 general election

2021 federal election redistributed results
Party	Vote	%
New Democratic	15,921	39.78
Liberal	12,507	31.25
Conservative	8,868	22.16
People's	1,353	3.38
Green	1,168	2.92
Others	210	0.52

== Student vote results ==
Results of the Canadian student vote.

=== 2025 ===
2025 Canadian federal election
Party	Candidate	Votes	%
Conservative	James Yan	1,284	35.16
Liberal	Wade Chang	1,200	32.86
New Democratic	Jagmeet Singh	845	23.14
People's	Richard Farbridge	323	8.84
Total valid votes		3,652	100.0
Source: Student Vote Canada
