= Wade Chang =

Canadian politician

Wade Chang MP
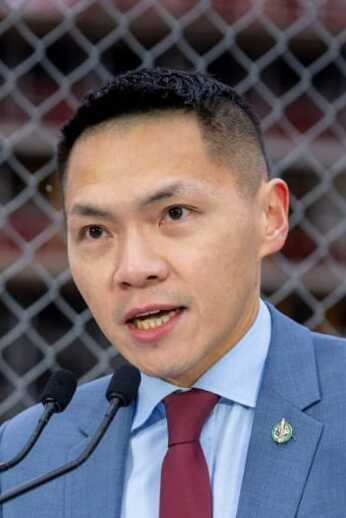
- Chang making a housing announcement in February 2026

Member of Parliament for Burnaby Central
- Incumbent
- Assumed office April 28, 2025
- Preceded by: Riding established (Note: Jagmeet Singh was the MP for Burnaby South, which was abolished in 2023; Singh ran for re-election in Burnaby Central and lost to Chang.)

Personal details
- Born: 1985 or 1986 (age 40–41) Yilan City, Taiwan
- Party: Liberal
- Education: University of Melbourne (LLB); Oxford University (MBA)
- Profession: Lawyer

Chinese name
- Traditional Chinese: 張瑋麟
- Simplified Chinese: 张玮麟
Transcriptions
Standard Mandarin
- Hanyu Pinyin: Zhāng Wěilín
- Wade–Giles: Chang^{1} Wei^{3}-lin^{2}

Wade Wei Lin Chang MP (Chinese: 張瑋麟; born 1985 or 1986) is a Taiwanese-born Canadian politician and lawyer. He has served as a member of Parliament (MP) for the riding of Burnaby Central since 2025, as part of the Liberal Party of Canada caucus.

== Biography ==
Born in Yilan City, Taiwan, Chang moved to Canada with his family in grade six. After finishing secondary school in Canada, he earned a law degree from the University of Melbourne, and an MBA from Oxford.

In the 2025 Canadian federal election, he contested the newly established riding of Burnaby Central as a Liberal candidate, and defeated the federal New Democratic Party leader Jagmeet Singh to become the riding's MP. He is the second Taiwanese Canadian to be elected to the House of Commons of Canada, and according to him, the country's first gay Asian MP.

== Parliamentary Committees ==
Chang served on the Standing Committee on Justice and Human Rights from September 2025 to April 2026. In May 2026, he joined the Standing Committee on Citizenship and Immigration and the Standing Committee on Access to Information, Privacy and Ethics. As of September 2026, Chang left the Ethics Committee and returned to the Justice Committee, while retaining his membership on the Citizenship and Immigration Committee.

== Parliamentary Friendship Groups ==
As of September 2026, Chang holds executive positions on the following Parliamentary Friendship Groups:

Vice-Chair, Canada-Indonesia Parliamentary Friendship Groups

Vice-Chair and Treasurer, Canada-Vietnam Parliamentary Friendship Group

== Electoral record ==
2025 Canadian federal election: Burnaby Central
Party	Candidate	Votes	%	±%	Expenditures
Liberal	Wade Chang	21,745	42.23	+10.98	$75,752.57
Conservative	James Yan	19,889	38.62	+16.47	$122,829.34
New Democratic	Jagmeet Singh	9,353	18.16	–21.62	$129,759.41
People's	Richard Farbridge	506	0.98	–2.40	$585.48
Total valid votes/expense limit		51,493	99.17	–	$129,924.64
Total rejected ballots		430	0.83	–	
Turnout		51,923	61.27	–	
Eligible voters		84,744			
Liberal notional gain from New Democratic		Swing		+16.30	
Source: Elections Canada
