= Sullivan Heights, Burnaby =

Neighourhood in Burnaby, British Columbia

Sullivan Heights
- Neighbourhood
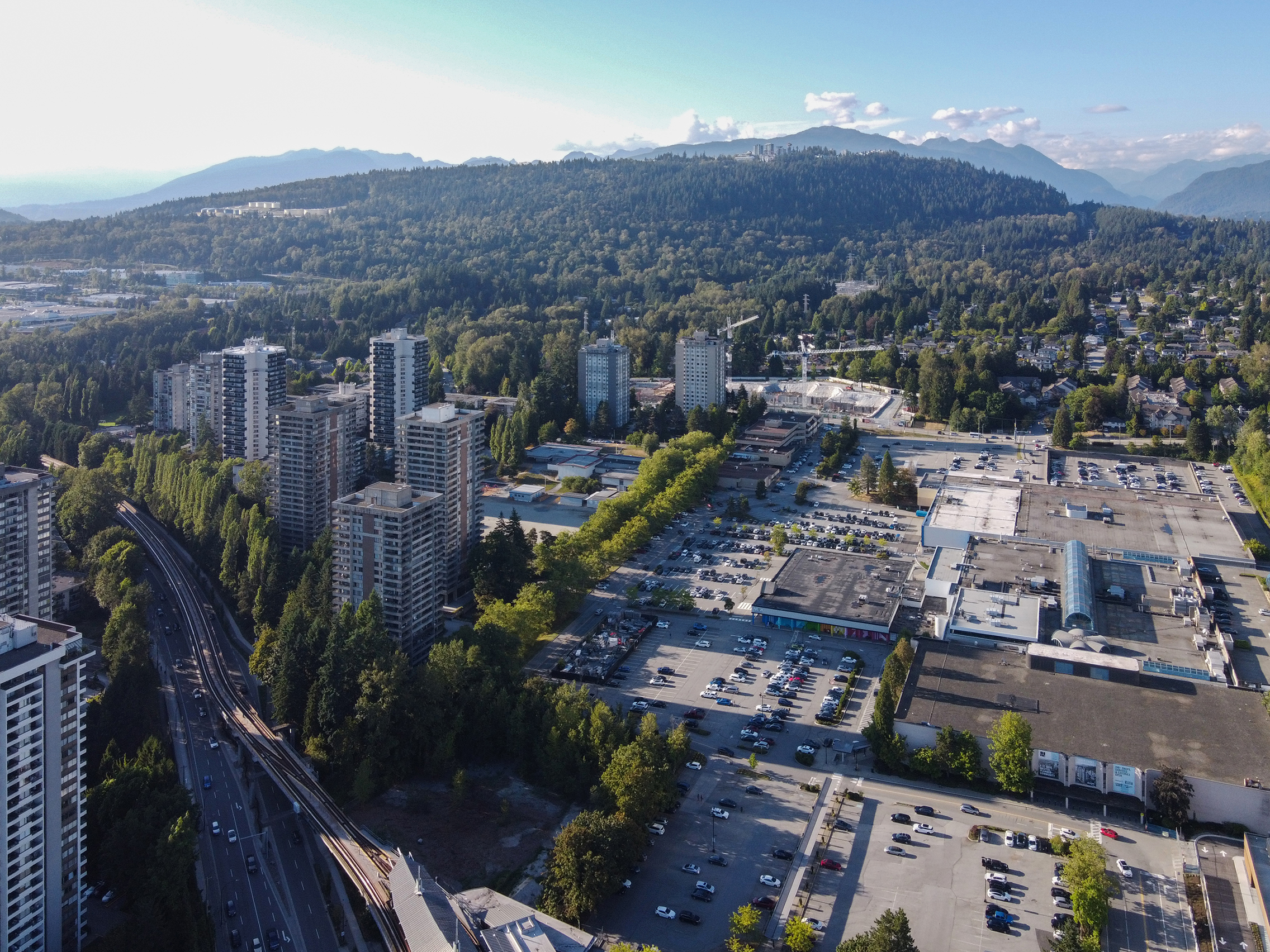
- Sullivan Heights

- Location in Metro Vancouver
- Coordinates: 49.267°N 122.967°W
- Country: Canada
- Province: British Columbia
- City: Burnaby

Sullivan Heights is a neighbourhood in Burnaby, just north of Lougheed highway, east of Government Road and south of SFU (Simon Fraser University) campus. Bordering the city of Coquitlam and Port Moody, the area is served by the Millennium Line that connects the city of Coquitlam to other parts of greater Vancouver.

== Amenities ==
The neighbourhood's collection of restaurants, cafes and boutique eateries fosters residents to stay near home, but if they do want to hop onto Vancouver's west, the downtown district and other parts of greater Vancouver are conveniently connected with two prominent SkyTrain stations, Lougheed Town Centre station and Burquitlam Station.

North Road, a dividing road between Coquitlam and Burnaby, forms the eastern border of Sullivan Heights making it the boundary region of Burnaby with West Coquitlam, an area more colloquially referred to as Burquitlam.

== Schools ==
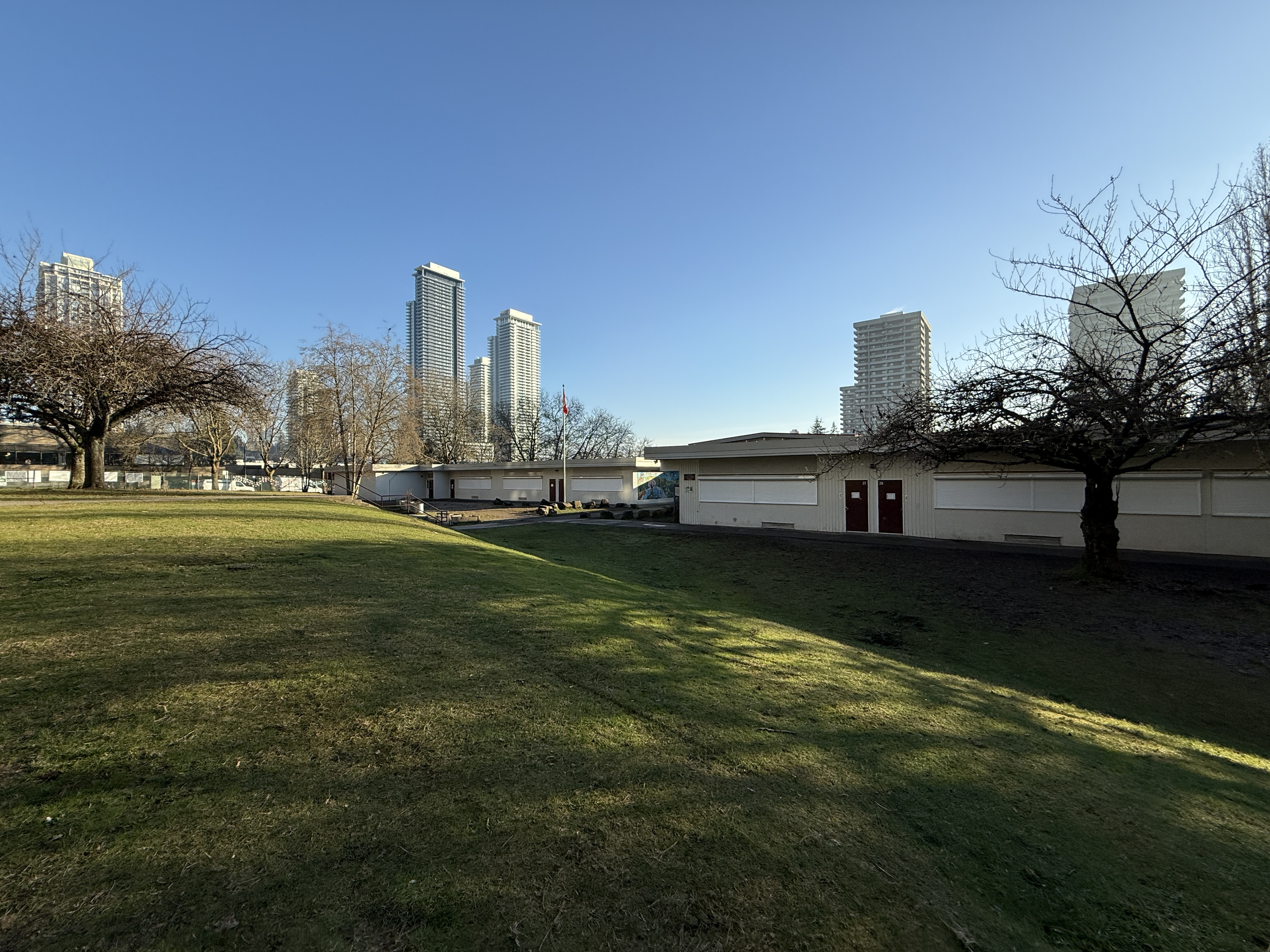
Cameron Elementary

- Stoney Creek Community School (K–7)
- Lyndhurst Elementary (K–7)
- Cameron Elementary (K–7)
- Burnaby Mountain Secondary (8–12)
