= Alice Wong =

Alice Wong may refer to:

- Alice Wong (politician) (born 1948), Canadian politician
- Alice Wong (activist) (1974–2025), American disability rights activist
- Alice Wong 黃嘉欣, participant in Miss Chinese International Pageant 2016

== See also ==
- Alice Huang (disambiguation)
