= Canadian federal election results in the Fraser Valley and the Southern Lower Mainland =

Seats obtained by party

Conservative
Liberal
New Democratic
Alliance (defunct)
Reform (defunct)
Progressive Conservative (defunct)
Social Credit (defunct)
Independents

This is page shows results of Canadian federal elections in the Fraser Valley region of British Columbia. As defined for this article, the Fraser Valley includes the southern suburbs of Vancouver. Areas outside the Fraser Valley, namely the Fraser Canyon and regions to its west, are also included within one of the ridings. The largest of these ridings is the Chilliwack-Hope riding. This riding also includes most of the Fraser Valley until it joins the Okanagan-Similkameen and extends westward until outside Abbotsford.

== Regional profile ==
The Fraser Valley is traditionally one of the most socially conservative areas in British Columbia, although it is slowly becoming more liberal as urban sprawl extends eastward. This region has been dominated by the Conservatives and the former Reform and Canadian Alliance parties for most of the time from 1993 to 2011.

The northern parts of Surrey historically leaned toward the NDP until the 1990s. In 2011, the Liberals lost their remaining seat in the region, while the NDP picked up two seats in Surrey. The NDP won Surrey North in 2006 which was the first time the NDP won a seat in the region since 1988. They lost the riding to the Conservatives in 2008 before winning it back in 2011, only to lose it to the Liberals in 2015.

The base of Liberal support in the region has traditionally been in Richmond. They held the seat of Richmond from 1993 to 2000 and from 2004 to 2008. Since then, the Conservatives have made inroads with the Chinese community in Richmond, and have held Richmond ever since. By then, the two seats representing Richmond had been captured by the Conservatives. The Liberals picked up a second seat in the region in 2006, Newton—North Delta which they lost to the NDP in 2011. However, in 2015, the Liberals regained the seat's successor, Surrey-Newton. They also managed to regain parts of the city of Richmond, specifically Steveston-Richmond East. The Conservatives gained both seats back in 2019, only to lose both to the Liberals in 2021.

Conservative support has traditionally been the strongest in the Fraser Valley Regional District, Langley and in southern Surrey. Since 2004, the Conservatives' best riding has been Abbotsford. In 2011, they won 65% of the vote there. They also won over 60% of the vote in neighboring Langley. The FVRD is sometimes referred to BC's "bible belt" due to its high population of evangelical Christians, giving it a character similar to ridings in rural portions of the Prairies.

=== Votes by party throughout time ===
Election	Liberal	Conservative	New Democratic	Green	People's	PC	Reform / Alliance	Social Credit	Others
1979	45,063; 17.8%	—	76,811; 30.4%	—	—	130,012; 51.4%	—	—	1,075; 0.4%
1980	48,628; 18.8%	—	83,144; 32.2%	—	—	122,817; 47.6%	—	358; 0.1%	3,108; 1.2%
1984	47,449; 14.5%	—	97,514; 29.9%	1,565; 0.5%	—	176,447; 54.0%	—	327; 0.1%	3,216; 1.0%
1988	75,555; 20.9%	—	110,895; 30.6%	672; 0.2%	—	149,601; 41.3%	12,981; 3.6%	—	12,542; 3.5%
1993	125,729; 30.8%	—	34,913; 8.6%	1,612; 0.4%	—	58,581; 14.4%	165,106; 40.5%	—	22,017; 5.4%
1997	110,527; 29.8%	—	42,332; 11.4%	3,784; 1.0%	—	19,885; 5.4%	182,774; 49.3%	—	11,228; 3.0%
2000	103,026; 25.6%	—	25,376; 6.3%	4,000; 1.0%	—	29,218; 7.3%	235,993; 58.7%	—	4,168; 1.0%
2004	124,335; 27.7%	187,009; 41.7%	92,048; 20.5%	22,019; 4.9%	—	—	—	—	22,754; 5.1%
2006	124,512; 26.3%	210,929; 44.5%	110,318; 23.3%	19,620; 4.1%	—	—	—	—	8,148; 1.7%
2008	90,522; 19.1%	247,075; 52.3%	95,383; 20.2%	35,010; 7.4%	—	—	—	—	4,800; 1.0%
2011	73,279; 14.9%	259,751; 53.0%	130,438; 26.6%	22,302; 4.5%	—	—	—	—	4,757; 1.0%
2015	267,733; 41.7%	230,017; 35.9%	115,501; 18.0%	24,203; 3.8%	—	—	—	—	3,895; 0.6%
2019	208,174; 32.2%	256,259; 39.6%	121,097; 18.7%	46,215; 7.1%	11,526; 1.8%	—	—	—	3,751; 0.6%
2021	213,164; 34.7%	227,721; 37.1%	130,939; 21.3%	11,536; 1.9%	28,051; 4.6%	—	—	—	2,193; 0.4%
2025	323,543; 44.4%	347,960; 47.7%	36,375; 5.0%	6,133; 0.8%	4,089; 0.6%	—	—	—	11,038; 1.5%

Liberal Conservative New Democratic Green People's	Progressive Conservative (defunct) Alliance (defunct) Reform (defunct) Social Credit (defunct)

== 2019 ==
Electoral district	Candidates						Incumbent
Electoral district	Conservative	NDP	Liberal	Green	PPC	Other	Incumbent
Abbotsford	Ed Fast; 25,162; 51.4%	Madeleine Sauve; 8,257; 16.9%	Seamus Heffernan; 10,560; 21.6%	Stephen Fowler; 3,702; 7.6%	Locke Duncan; 985; 2.0%	Aeriol Alderking; CHP; 270; 0.6%	Ed Fast
Chilliwack—Hope	Mark Strahl; 26,672; 49.6%	Heather McQuillan; 8957; 16.7%	Kelly Velonis; 10,848; 20.2%	Arthur Green; 5,243; 9.8%	Rob Bogunovic; 1,760; 3.3%	Daniel Lamache; CHP; 202; 0.4% Dorothy-Jean O'Donnell; M-L; 73; 0.1%	Mark Strahl
Cloverdale—Langley City	Tamara Jansen; 20,936; 37.7%	Rae Banwarie; 10,508; 18.9%	John Aldag; 19,542; 35.2%	Caelum Nutbrown; 3,572; 6.5%	Ian Kennedy; 930; 1.7%		John Aldag
Delta	Tanya Corbert; 17,809; 33.0%	Randy Anderson-Fennell; 8,792; 16.3%	Carla Qualtrough; 22,257; 41.2%	Craig DeCraene; 3,387; 6.3%	Angela Ireland; 458; 1.8%	Amarit Bains (Ind.); 0.7% 398; Tony Bennett (Ind.); 385; 0.7%	Carla Qualtrough
Fleetwood—Port Kells	Shinder Purewal; 16,646; 33.8%	Annie Ohana; 10,569; 21.5%	Ken Hardie; 18,545; 37.7%	Tanya Baertl; 2,378; 4.8%	Mike Poulin; 1,104; 2.2%		Ken Hardie
Langley—Aldergrove	Tako Van Popta; 29,823; 46.73%	Stacy Wakelin; 10,690; 16.75%	Leon Jensen; 16,254; 25.47%	Kaija Farstad; 4,881; 7.65%	Natalie Dipietra-Cudmore; 1,305; 2.05	Alex Joehl (Libert.); 499; 0.78%	Mark Warawa
Mission—Matsqui—Fraser Canyon	Brad Vis; 19,535; 42.4%	Michael Nenn; 8,089; 17.6%	Jati Sidhu; 12,299; 26.7%	John Kidder; 5,019; 10.9%	Julius Nick Csaszar; 1,055; 2.3%	Elaine Wismer; M-L; 69; 0.1%	Jati Sidhu
Pitt Meadows—Maple Ridge	Marc Dalton; 19,650; 36.2%	John Mogk; 12,958; 23.9%	Dan Ruimy; 16,125; 29.7%	Ariane Jaschke; 4,332; 8.0%	Bryton Cherrier; 698; 1.3%	Steve Ranta (Ind.); 468; 0.9%	Dan Ruimy
Richmond Centre	Alice Wong; 19,037; 49.0%	Dustin Innes; 5,617; 14.5%	Steven Kou; 11,052; 28.5%	Françoise Raunet; 2,376; 6.1%	Ivan Pak; 538; 1.4%	Zhe Zhang (Ind.); 197; 0.5%	Alice Wong
South Surrey—White Rock	Kerry-Lynne Findlay; 24,310; 41.9%	Stephen Crozier; 6,716; 11.6%	Gordie Hogg; 21,692; 37.4	Beverly Pixie Hobby; 4,458; 7.7%	Joel Poulin; 825; 1.5%		Gordie Hogg
Steveston—Richmond East	Kenny Chiu; 17,478; 41.7%	Jaeden Dela Torre; 6,321; 15.1%	Joe Peschisolido; 14,731; 35.1%	Nicole Iaci; 2,972; 7.1%		Ping Chan (Ind.); 449; 1.1%	Joe Peschisolido
Surrey Centre	Tina Bains; 10,505; 25.4%	Sarjit Singh Saran; 11,353; 27.5%	Randeep Sarai; 15,435; 37.4%	John Werring; 2,558; 6.2%	Jaswinder Singh Dilawari; 709; 1.7%	George Gidora (Comm.); 120; 0.3% Kevin Pielak; CHP; 378; 0.9; Jeffrey Breti (Ind.); 243; 0.6%	Randeep Sarai
Surrey—Newton	Harpreet Singh; 8,824; 21.0%	Harjit Singh Gill; 12,306; 29.2%	Sukh Dhaliwal; 18,960; 45.0%	Rabaab Khehra; 1,355; 3.2%	Holly Verchère; 653; 1.6%		Sukh Dhaliwal

== 2015 ==
Electoral district	Candidates					Incumbent
Electoral district	Conservative	NDP	Liberal	Green	Other	Incumbent
Abbotsford	Ed Fast; 23,229; 48.27%	Jen Martel; 6,593; 13.70%	Peter Njenga; 15,777; 32.78%	Stephen Fowler; 2,416; 5.02%	David MacKay (M-L); 109; 0.23%	Ed Fast
Chilliwack—Hope	Mark Strahl; 21,445; 42.33%	Seonaigh MacPherson; 9,218; 18.20%	Louis De Jaeger; 17,114; 33.78%	Thomas Cheney; 2,386; 4.71%	Alexander Johnson (Libert.); 416 0.82%	Mark Strahl; Chilliwack—Fraser Canyon
Chilliwack—Hope	Mark Strahl; 21,445; 42.33%	Seonaigh MacPherson; 9,218; 18.20%	Louis De Jaeger; 17,114; 33.78%	Thomas Cheney; 2,386; 4.71%	Dorothy-Jean O'Donnell (M-L); 82 0.16%	Mark Strahl; Chilliwack—Fraser Canyon
Cloverdale—Langley City	Dean Drysdale; 18,800; 34.77%	Rebecca Smith; 8,463; 15.65%	John Aldag; 24,617; 45.52%	Scott Anderson; 2,195; 4.06%		New District
Delta	Kerry-Lynne Findlay; 18,255; 32.78%	Jeremy Leveque; 8,311; 14.92%	Carla Qualtrough; 27,355; 49.12%	Anthony Edward Devellano; 1,768; 3.17%		New District
Fleetwood—Port Kells	Nina Grewal; 14,275; 29.27%	Garry Begg; 10,463; 21.46%	Ken Hardie; 22,871; 46.90%	Richard Hosein; 1,154; 2.37%		Nina Grewal
Langley—Aldergrove	Mark Warawa; 27,333; 45.63%	Margot Sangster; 7,490; 12.51%	Leon Jensen; 21,894; 36.55%	Simmi Saminder Kaur Dhillon; 2,644; 4.41%	Lauren Southern (Libert.); 535; 0.89%	Mark Warawa; Langley
Mission—Matsqui—Fraser Canyon	Brad Vis; 15,587; 34.91%	Dennis Adamson; 9,174; 20.55%	Jati Sidhu; 16,625; 37.23%	Arthur Alexander Green; 2,293; 5.14%	Wyatt Scott (Ind.); 914 2.05%	New District
Mission—Matsqui—Fraser Canyon	Brad Vis; 15,587; 34.91%	Dennis Adamson; 9,174; 20.55%	Jati Sidhu; 16,625; 37.23%	Arthur Alexander Green; 2,293; 5.14%	Elaine Wismer (M-L); 58 0.13%	New District
Pitt Meadows—Maple Ridge	Mike Murray; 16,373; 31.40%	Bob D'Eith; 15,450; 29.63%	Dan Ruimy; 17,673; 33.89%	Peter Tam; 2,202; 4.22%	Steve Ranta (Ind.); 452; 0.87%	Randy Kamp†; Pitt Meadows—Maple Ridge—Mission
Richmond Centre	Alice Wong; 17,622; 44.21%	Jack Trovato; 4,602; 11.54%	Lawrence Woo; 16,486; 41.36%	Vincent Chiu; 1,152; 2.89%		Alice Wong; Richmond
South Surrey—White Rock	Dianne Lynn Watts; 24,934; 44.03%	Pixie Hobby; 5,895; 10.41%	Judy Higginbotham; 23,495; 41.49%	Larry Colero; 1,938; 3.42%	Bonnie Hu (Libert.); 261 0.46%	Russ Hiebert†; South Surrey—White Rock—Cloverdale
South Surrey—White Rock	Dianne Lynn Watts; 24,934; 44.03%	Pixie Hobby; 5,895; 10.41%	Judy Higginbotham; 23,495; 41.49%	Larry Colero; 1,938; 3.42%	Brian Marlatt (PC); 108 0.19%	Russ Hiebert†; South Surrey—White Rock—Cloverdale
Steveston—Richmond East	Kenny Chiu; 16,630; 38.47%	Scott Stewart; 5,248; 12.14%	Joe Peschisolido; 19,486; 45.08%	Laura-Leah Shaw; 1,587; 3.67%	Matthew Swanston (Libert.); 274; 0.63%	Kerry-Lynne Findlay‡ Delta—Richmond East
Surrey Centre	Sucha Thind; 8,556; 19.81%	Jasbir Sandhu; 12,992; 30.08%	Randeep Sarai; 19,471; 45.07%	Jeremiah Deneault; 1,493; 3.46%	Iqbal Kahlon (Comm.); 133 0.31%	Jasbir Sandhu; Surrey North
Surrey Centre	Sucha Thind; 8,556; 19.81%	Jasbir Sandhu; 12,992; 30.08%	Randeep Sarai; 19,471; 45.07%	Jeremiah Deneault; 1,493; 3.46%	Kevin Pielak (CHP); 553 1.28%	Jasbir Sandhu; Surrey North
Surrey—Newton	Harpreet Singh; 6,978; 15.71%	Jinny Sims; 11,602; 26.12%	Sukh Dhaliwal; 24,869; 55.98%	Pamela Sangha; 975; 2.19%		Jinny Sims; Newton—North Delta

== 2011 ==
Electoral district	Candidates					Incumbent
Electoral district	Conservative	Liberal	NDP	Green	Other	Incumbent
Abbotsford	Ed Fast; 32,493; 65.02%	Madeleine Hardin; 4,968; 9.94%	David Alan Murray; 10,089; 20.19%	Daniel Bryce; 2,138; 4.28%	David MacKay (M-L); 286; 0.57%	Ed Fast
Chilliwack—Fraser Canyon	Mark Strahl; 28,160; 57.20%	Diane Janzen; 5,320; 10.81%	Gwen O'Mahony; 12,691; 25.78%	Jamie Hoskins; 2,706; 5.50%	Clive Edwards (WBP); 180 0.37%	Chuck Strahl†
Chilliwack—Fraser Canyon	Mark Strahl; 28,160; 57.20%	Diane Janzen; 5,320; 10.81%	Gwen O'Mahony; 12,691; 25.78%	Jamie Hoskins; 2,706; 5.50%	Dorothy-Jean O'Donnell (M-L); 173 0.35%	Chuck Strahl†
Delta—Richmond East	Kerry-Lynne Findlay; 26,059; 54.24%	Alan Beesley; 8,112; 16.88%	Nic Slater; 11,181; 23.27%	Duane Laird; 2,324; 4.84%	Jeff Monds (Libert.); 147 0.31%	John Cummins†
Delta—Richmond East	Kerry-Lynne Findlay; 26,059; 54.24%	Alan Beesley; 8,112; 16.88%	Nic Slater; 11,181; 23.27%	Duane Laird; 2,324; 4.84%	John Shavluk (Ind.); 220 0.46%	John Cummins†
Fleetwood—Port Kells	Nina Grewal; 23,950; 47.55%	Pam Dhanoa; 8,041; 15.96%	Nao Fernando; 16,533; 32.82%	Alan Saldanha; 1,476; 2.93%	Alex Joehl (Libert.); 370; 0.73%	Nina Grewal
Langley	Mark Warawa; 35,569; 64.52%	Rebecca Darnell; 4,990; 9.05%	Piotr Majkowski; 11,277; 20.45%	Carey Ann Poitras; 2,943; 5.34%	Craig Nobbs (Pirate); 353; 0.64%	Mark Warawa
Newton—North Delta	Mani Fallon; 14,437; 31.30%	Sukh Dhaliwal; 14,510; 31.46%	Jinny Sims; 15,413; 33.42%	Liz Walker; 1,520; 3.30%	Ravi S. Gill (Ind.); 123 0.27%	Sukh Dhaliwal
Newton—North Delta	Mani Fallon; 14,437; 31.30%	Sukh Dhaliwal; 14,510; 31.46%	Jinny Sims; 15,413; 33.42%	Liz Walker; 1,520; 3.30%	Samuel Frank Hammond (Comm.); 116 0.25%	Sukh Dhaliwal
Pitt Meadows— Maple Ridge—Mission	Randy Kamp; 28,803; 54.34%	Mandeep Bhuller; 2,739; 5.17%	Craig Speirs; 18,835; 35.53%	Peter Tam; 2,629; 4.96%		Randy Kamp
Richmond	Alice Wong; 25,109; 58.36%	Joe Peschisolido; 8,027; 18.66%	Dale Jackaman; 7,860; 18.27%	Michael Wolfe; 2,032; 4.72%		Alice Wong
South Surrey— White Rock—Cloverdale	Russ Hiebert; 31,990; 54.55%	Hardy Staub; 9,775; 16.67%	Susan Keeping; 11,881; 20.26%	Larry Colero; 3,245; 5.53%	Kevin Peter Donohoe (Ind.); 152 0.26%	Russ Hiebert
South Surrey— White Rock—Cloverdale	Russ Hiebert; 31,990; 54.55%	Hardy Staub; 9,775; 16.67%	Susan Keeping; 11,881; 20.26%	Larry Colero; 3,245; 5.53%	David Hawkins (Ind.); 189 0.32%	Russ Hiebert
South Surrey— White Rock—Cloverdale	Russ Hiebert; 31,990; 54.55%	Hardy Staub; 9,775; 16.67%	Susan Keeping; 11,881; 20.26%	Larry Colero; 3,245; 5.53%	Aart Looye (Ind.); 753 1.28%	Russ Hiebert
South Surrey— White Rock—Cloverdale	Russ Hiebert; 31,990; 54.55%	Hardy Staub; 9,775; 16.67%	Susan Keeping; 11,881; 20.26%	Larry Colero; 3,245; 5.53%	Brian Marlatt (PC); 228 0.39%	Russ Hiebert
South Surrey— White Rock—Cloverdale	Russ Hiebert; 31,990; 54.55%	Hardy Staub; 9,775; 16.67%	Susan Keeping; 11,881; 20.26%	Larry Colero; 3,245; 5.53%	Mike Schouten (CHP); 429 0.73%	Russ Hiebert
Surrey North	Dona Cadman; 13,181; 35.64%	Shinder Purewal; 6,797; 18.38%	Jasbir Sandhu; 14,678; 39.69%	Bernadette Keenan; 1,289; 3.49%	Norris Barens (Libert.); 284 0.77%	Dona Cadman
Surrey North	Dona Cadman; 13,181; 35.64%	Shinder Purewal; 6,797; 18.38%	Jasbir Sandhu; 14,678; 39.69%	Bernadette Keenan; 1,289; 3.49%	Kevin Pielak (CHP); 303 0.82%	Dona Cadman
Surrey North	Dona Cadman; 13,181; 35.64%	Shinder Purewal; 6,797; 18.38%	Jasbir Sandhu; 14,678; 39.69%	Bernadette Keenan; 1,289; 3.49%	Jamie Scott (Ind.); 451 1.22%	Dona Cadman

=== Maps ===
1. Abbotsford
2. Chilliwack—Hope
3. Cloverdale—Langley City
4. Delta
5. Fleetwood—Port Kells
6. Langley—Aldergrove
7. Mission—Matsqui —Fraser Canyon
8. Pitt Medows—Maple Ridge
9. Richmond Centre
10. South Surrey—White Rock
11. Steveston—Richmond East
12. Surrey Centre
13. Surrey—Newton

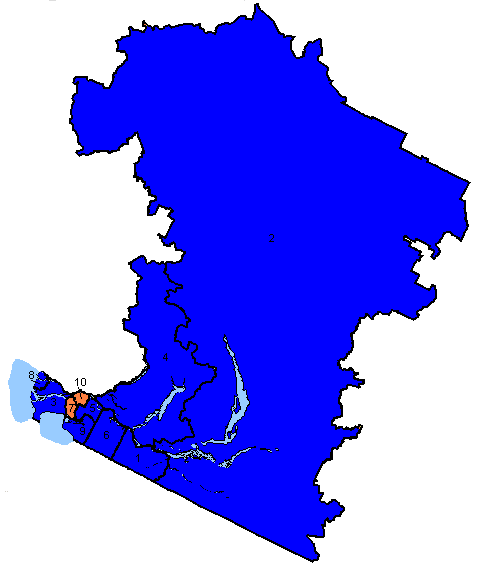
Key map

== 2008 ==
Electoral district	Candidates					Incumbent
Electoral district	Conservative	Liberal	NDP	Green	Other	Incumbent
Abbotsford	Ed Fast; 30,853; 63.32%	Lionel Dominique Traverse; 7,933; 16.28%	Bonnie Rai; 6,444; 13.22%	Karen Durant; 3,141; 6.45%	Tim Felger (Mar.); 358; 0.73%	Ed Fast
Chilliwack— Fraser Canyon	Chuck Strahl; 29,198; 62.32%	Myra Sweeney; 3,990; 8.52%	Helen Kormendy; 8,791; 18.76%	Barbara Lebeau; 4,107; 8.77%	Harold J. Ludwig (CHP); 653 1.39%	Chuck Strahl
Chilliwack— Fraser Canyon	Chuck Strahl; 29,198; 62.32%	Myra Sweeney; 3,990; 8.52%	Helen Kormendy; 8,791; 18.76%	Barbara Lebeau; 4,107; 8.77%	Dorothy-Jean O'Donnell (M-L); 113 0.24%	Chuck Strahl
Delta— Richmond East	John Cummins; 26,252; 55.75%	Dana L. Miller; 10,371; 22.02%	Szilvia Barna; 6,803; 14.45%	Matthew Laine; 3,663; 7.78%		John Cummins
Fleetwood— Port Kells	Nina Grewal; 21,389; 44.70%	Brenda Locke; 12,502; 26.13%	Nao Fernando; 10,916; 22.81%	Brian Newbold; 3,045; 6.36%		Nina Grewal
Langley	Mark Warawa; 32,594; 61.46%	Jake Gray; 5,888; 11.10%	Andrew Claxton; 8,898; 16.78%	Patrick Meyer; 5,059; 9.54%	Ron Gray (CHP); 594; 1.12%	Mark Warawa
Newton— North Delta	Sandeep Pandher; 13,988; 30.91%	Sukh Dhaliwal; 16,481; 36.42%	Teresa Townsley; 11,824; 26.13%	Liz Walker; 2,533; 5.60%	Harjit Daudharia (Comm.); 121 0.27%	Sukh Dhaliwal
Newton— North Delta	Sandeep Pandher; 13,988; 30.91%	Sukh Dhaliwal; 16,481; 36.42%	Teresa Townsley; 11,824; 26.13%	Liz Walker; 2,533; 5.60%	James William Miller-Cousineau (Ind.); 179 0.40%	Sukh Dhaliwal
Newton— North Delta	Sandeep Pandher; 13,988; 30.91%	Sukh Dhaliwal; 16,481; 36.42%	Teresa Townsley; 11,824; 26.13%	Liz Walker; 2,533; 5.60%	John Shavluk (Ind.); 126 0.28%	Sukh Dhaliwal
Pitt Meadows— Maple Ridge— Mission	Randy Kamp; 26,512; 51.81%	Dan Olson; 3,394; 6.63%	Mike Bocking; 16,894; 33.01%	Mike Gildersleeve; 3,833; 7.49%	Jeff Monds (Libert.); 300 0.59%	Randy Kamp
Pitt Meadows— Maple Ridge— Mission	Randy Kamp; 26,512; 51.81%	Dan Olson; 3,394; 6.63%	Mike Bocking; 16,894; 33.01%	Mike Gildersleeve; 3,833; 7.49%	Evans Nicholson (Ind.); 137 0.27%	Randy Kamp
Pitt Meadows— Maple Ridge— Mission	Randy Kamp; 26,512; 51.81%	Dan Olson; 3,394; 6.63%	Mike Bocking; 16,894; 33.01%	Mike Gildersleeve; 3,833; 7.49%	Chum Richardson (Ind.); 101 0.20%	Randy Kamp
Richmond	Alice Wong; 21,359; 49.81%	Raymond Chan; 13,221; 30.83%	Dale Jackaman; 5,059; 11.80%	Michael Anthony Wolfe; 2,753; 6.42%	Wei Ping Chen (Ind.); 395 0.92%	Raymond Chan
Richmond	Alice Wong; 21,359; 49.81%	Raymond Chan; 13,221; 30.83%	Dale Jackaman; 5,059; 11.80%	Michael Anthony Wolfe; 2,753; 6.42%	Dobie Yiu-Chung To (Ind.); 91 0.21%	Raymond Chan
South Surrey— White Rock— Cloverdale	Russ Hiebert; 31,216; 56.65%	Judy Higginbotham; 11,515; 20.90%	Peter Prontzos; 7,146; 12.97%	David Blair; 4,951; 8.99%	Brian Marlatt (PC) 273; 0.50%	Russ Hiebert
Surrey North	Dona Cadman; 13,714; 39.37%	Marc Muhammad; 5,227; 15.01%	Rachid Arab; 12,608; 36.20%	Dan Kashamanga; 1,925; 5.53%	Psam Frank (CAP); 105 0.30%	Penny Priddy†
Surrey North	Dona Cadman; 13,714; 39.37%	Marc Muhammad; 5,227; 15.01%	Rachid Arab; 12,608; 36.20%	Dan Kashamanga; 1,925; 5.53%	Alex Joehl (Libert.); 347 1.00%	Penny Priddy†
Surrey North	Dona Cadman; 13,714; 39.37%	Marc Muhammad; 5,227; 15.01%	Rachid Arab; 12,608; 36.20%	Dan Kashamanga; 1,925; 5.53%	Bernadette Keenan (Ind.); 271 0.78%	Penny Priddy†
Surrey North	Dona Cadman; 13,714; 39.37%	Marc Muhammad; 5,227; 15.01%	Rachid Arab; 12,608; 36.20%	Dan Kashamanga; 1,925; 5.53%	Nikolas Langlands (PC); 152 0.44%	Penny Priddy†
Surrey North	Dona Cadman; 13,714; 39.37%	Marc Muhammad; 5,227; 15.01%	Rachid Arab; 12,608; 36.20%	Dan Kashamanga; 1,925; 5.53%	Kevin Pielak (CHP); 484 1.39%	Penny Priddy†

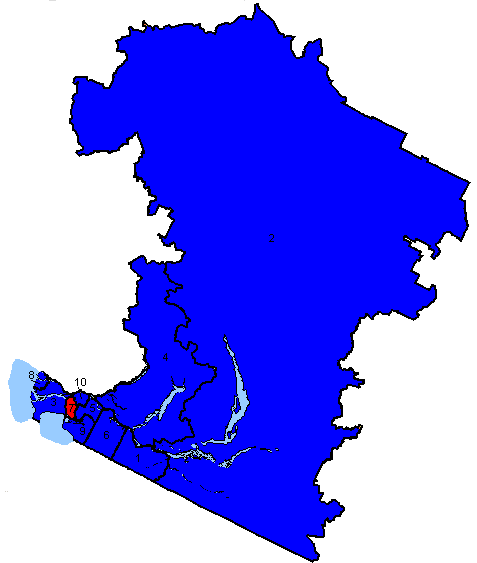
Key map

1. Abbotsford
2. Chilliwack-Fraser Canyon
3. Delta-Richmond East
4. Pitt Meadows-Maple Ridge-Mission
5. Fleetwood-Port Kells
6. Langley
7. Newton-North Delta
8. Richmond
9. South Surrey-White Rock-Cloverdale
10. Surrey North

== 2006 ==
Electoral district	Candidates					Incumbent
Electoral district	Liberal	Conservative	NDP	Green	Other	Incumbent
Abbotsford	David Oliver; 5,976; 12.68%	Ed Fast; 29,825; 63.27%	Jeffrey Hansen-Carlson; 8,004; 16.98%	Stephanie Ashley-Pryce; 2,740; 5.81%	Tim Felger (Mar.); 334 0.71%	Randy White†
Abbotsford	David Oliver; 5,976; 12.68%	Ed Fast; 29,825; 63.27%	Jeffrey Hansen-Carlson; 8,004; 16.98%	Stephanie Ashley-Pryce; 2,740; 5.81%	Richard Gebert (CAP); 173 0.37%	Randy White†
Abbotsford	David Oliver; 5,976; 12.68%	Ed Fast; 29,825; 63.27%	Jeffrey Hansen-Carlson; 8,004; 16.98%	Stephanie Ashley-Pryce; 2,740; 5.81%	David S. MacKay (M-L); 86 0.18%	Randy White†
Chilliwack—Fraser Canyon	Myra Sweeney; 8,106; 16.91%	Chuck Strahl; 26,842; 55.99%	Malcolm James; 10,015; 20.89%	Ed Baye; 1,929; 4.02%	Ron Gray (CHP); 935 1.95%	Chuck Strahl
Chilliwack—Fraser Canyon	Myra Sweeney; 8,106; 16.91%	Chuck Strahl; 26,842; 55.99%	Malcolm James; 10,015; 20.89%	Ed Baye; 1,929; 4.02%	Dorothy-Jean O'Donnell (M-L); 114 0.24%	Chuck Strahl
Delta—Richmond East	Patricia Whittaker; 15,527; 31.88%	John Cummins; 23,595; 48.44%	William Jonsson; 7,176; 14.73%	Jean-Philippe Laflamme; 2,414; 4.96%		John Cummins
Fleetwood—Port Kells	Brenda Locke; 13,749; 31.57%	Nina Grewal; 14,577; 33.47%	Barry Bell; 10,961; 25.17%	Duncan McDonald; 1,059; 2.43%	Jack Cook (Ind.); 3,202; 7.35%	Nina Grewal
Langley	Bill Brooks; 12,553; 23.09%	Mark Warawa; 28,577; 52.57%	Angel Claypool; 9,993; 18.38%	Patrick Meyer; 3,023; 5.56%	Vicki Lee Sloan (CAP); 211; 0.39%	Mark Warawa
Newton—North Delta	Sukh Dhaliwal; 15,006; 34.25%	Phil Eidsvik; 13,416; 30.62%	Nancy Clegg; 14,006; 31.96%	Sunny Athwal; 853; 1.95%	Harjit Daudharia (Comm.); 112 0.26%	Gurmant Grewal†
Newton—North Delta	Sukh Dhaliwal; 15,006; 34.25%	Phil Eidsvik; 13,416; 30.62%	Nancy Clegg; 14,006; 31.96%	Sunny Athwal; 853; 1.95%	Rob Girn (Ind.); 319 0.73%	Gurmant Grewal†
Newton—North Delta	Sukh Dhaliwal; 15,006; 34.25%	Phil Eidsvik; 13,416; 30.62%	Nancy Clegg; 14,006; 31.96%	Sunny Athwal; 853; 1.95%	Mike Saifie (Ind.); 106 0.24%	Gurmant Grewal†
Pitt Meadows—Maple Ridge— Mission	Keith Henry; 10,556; 20.25%	Randy Kamp; 20,946; 40.19%	Mike Bocking; 18,225; 34.97%	Rob Hornsey; 1,694; 3.25%	Dan Banov (Mar.); 327 0.63%	Randy Kamp
Pitt Meadows—Maple Ridge— Mission	Keith Henry; 10,556; 20.25%	Randy Kamp; 20,946; 40.19%	Mike Bocking; 18,225; 34.97%	Rob Hornsey; 1,694; 3.25%	Erin Knipstrom (Ind.); 277 0.53%	Randy Kamp
Pitt Meadows—Maple Ridge— Mission	Keith Henry; 10,556; 20.25%	Randy Kamp; 20,946; 40.19%	Mike Bocking; 18,225; 34.97%	Rob Hornsey; 1,694; 3.25%	Frank Martin (M-L); 95 0.18%	Randy Kamp
Richmond	Raymond Chan; 18,712; 42.83%	Darrel Robert Reid; 16,904; 38.69%	Neil Smith; 6,106; 13.98%	Richard Mathias; 1,967; 4.50%		Raymond Chan
South Surrey—White Rock— Cloverdale	Jim McMurtry; 17,336; 30.67%	Russ Hiebert; 26,383; 46.68%	Libby Thornton; 9,525; 16.85%	Pierre Rovtar; 2,980; 5.27%	Brian Marlatt (PC); 293; 0.52%	Russ Hiebert
Surrey North	Surjit Kooner; 6,991; 19.59%	David Matta; 9,864; 27.64%	Penny Priddy; 16,307; 45.69%	Roy Whyte; 961; 2.69%	John Baloun (Ind.); 420 1.18%	Vacant (Note: Formerly held by Independent MP Chuck Cadman, died July 9, 2005)
Surrey North	Surjit Kooner; 6,991; 19.59%	David Matta; 9,864; 27.64%	Penny Priddy; 16,307; 45.69%	Roy Whyte; 961; 2.69%	Nikolas Langlands (PC); 221 0.62%	Vacant
Surrey North	Surjit Kooner; 6,991; 19.59%	David Matta; 9,864; 27.64%	Penny Priddy; 16,307; 45.69%	Roy Whyte; 961; 2.69%	Kevin Pielak (CHP) 411 1.15%	Vacant
Surrey North	Surjit Kooner; 6,991; 19.59%	David Matta; 9,864; 27.64%	Penny Priddy; 16,307; 45.69%	Roy Whyte; 961; 2.69%	Nina Rivet (Ind.); 512 1.43%	Vacant

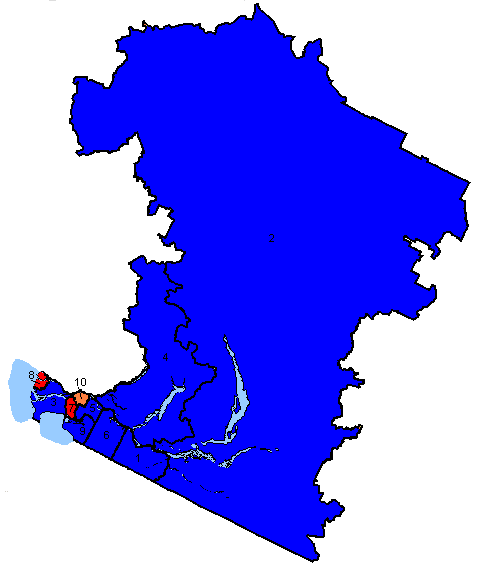
Key map

1. Abbotsford
2. Chilliwack-Fraser Canyon
3. Delta-Richmond East
4. Pitt Meadows-Maple Ridge-Mission
5. Fleetwood-Port Kells
6. Langley
7. Newton-North Delta
8. Richmond
9. South Surrey-White Rock-Cloverdale
10. Surrey North

== 2004 ==
Electoral district	Candidates					Incumbent
Electoral district	Liberal	Conservative	NDP	Green	Other	Incumbent
Abbotsford	Moe Gill; 9,617; 19.95%	Randy White; 29,587; 61.37%	Scott Fast; 6,575; 13.64%	Karl Hann; 1,389; 2.88%	Tim Felger (Mar.); 404 0.84%	Randy White
Abbotsford	Moe Gill; 9,617; 19.95%	Randy White; 29,587; 61.37%	Scott Fast; 6,575; 13.64%	Karl Hann; 1,389; 2.88%	Harold J. Ludwig (CHP); 585 1.21%	Randy White
Abbotsford	Moe Gill; 9,617; 19.95%	Randy White; 29,587; 61.37%	Scott Fast; 6,575; 13.64%	Karl Hann; 1,389; 2.88%	David MacKay (M-L); 51 0.11%	Randy White
Chilliwack—Fraser Canyon	Bob Besner; 8,249; 18.38%	Chuck Strahl; 24,096; 53.68%	Rollie L. Keith; 9,244; 20.59%	Aisha Coghlan; 1,449; 3.23%	Ron Gray (CHP); 1,156 2.58%	Chuck Strahl
Chilliwack—Fraser Canyon	Bob Besner; 8,249; 18.38%	Chuck Strahl; 24,096; 53.68%	Rollie L. Keith; 9,244; 20.59%	Aisha Coghlan; 1,449; 3.23%	Dorothy-Jean O'Donnell (M-L); 95 0.21%	Chuck Strahl
Chilliwack—Fraser Canyon	Bob Besner; 8,249; 18.38%	Chuck Strahl; 24,096; 53.68%	Rollie L. Keith; 9,244; 20.59%	Aisha Coghlan; 1,449; 3.23%	Norm Siefken (Mar.); 603 1.34%	Chuck Strahl
Delta—Richmond East	Shelley Leonhardt; 15,515; 33.20%	John Cummins; 21,308; 45.60%	Itrath Syed; 6,838; 14.63%	Dana L. Miller; 3,066; 6.56%		John Cummins
Dewdney—Alouette	Blanche Juneau; 10,500; 21.87%	Randy Kamp; 18,490; 38.51%	Mike Bocking; 15,693; 32.68%	Tammy Lea Meyer; 2,535; 5.28%	Scott Etches (NA); 798; 1.66%	Grant McNally†
Fleetwood—Port Kells	Gulzar Cheema; 11,568; 29.47%	Nina Grewal; 14,052; 35.80%	Barry Bell; 10,976; 27.97%	David Walters; 2,484; 6.33%	Joseph Theriault (M-L); 167; 0.43%	new district
Langley	Kim Richter; 12,649; 24.74%	Mark Warawa; 24,390; 47.70%	Dean Morrison; 8,568; 16.75%	Patrick Meyer; 3,108; 6.08%	Mel Kositsky (Ind.); 2,422; 4.74%	new district
Newton—North Delta	Sukh Dhaliwal; 13,009; 31.55%	Gurmant Grewal; 13,529; 32.82%	Nancy Clegg; 12,037; 29.20%	John Hague; 2,555; 6.20%	Nazir Rizvi (Comm.); 98; 0.24%	Gurmant Grewal
Richmond	Raymond Chan; 18,204; 44.48%	Alice Wong; 14,457; 35.33%	Dale Jackaman; 6,142; 15.01%	Stephen H.F. Kronstein; 1,743; 4.26%	Allan Warnke (CAP); 376; 0.92%	Joe Peschisolido§
South Surrey—White Rock—Cloverdale	Judy Higginbotham; 19,611; 36.77%	Russ Hiebert; 22,760; 42.67%	H. Pummy Kaur; 7,663; 14.37%	Romeo De La Pena; 3,032; 5.68%	Pat Taylor (CAP); 272; 0.51%	Val Meredith§
Surrey North	Dan Sheel; 5,413; 15.71%	Jasbir Singh Cheema; 4,340; 12.60%	Jim Karpoff; 8,312; 24.13%	Sunny Athwal; 658; 1.91%	Chuck Cadman (NA); 15,089; 43.80%	Chuck Cadman (Note: Cadman lost the Conservative nomination and left caucus to sit as an Independent in April 2004.)
Surrey North	Dan Sheel; 5,413; 15.71%	Jasbir Singh Cheema; 4,340; 12.60%	Jim Karpoff; 8,312; 24.13%	Sunny Athwal; 658; 1.91%	Gerhard Herwig (CHP); 460 1.34%	Chuck Cadman
Surrey North	Dan Sheel; 5,413; 15.71%	Jasbir Singh Cheema; 4,340; 12.60%	Jim Karpoff; 8,312; 24.13%	Sunny Athwal; 658; 1.91%	Joyce Holmes (Comm.); 93 0.27%	Chuck Cadman
Surrey North	Dan Sheel; 5,413; 15.71%	Jasbir Singh Cheema; 4,340; 12.60%	Jim Karpoff; 8,312; 24.13%	Sunny Athwal; 658; 1.91%	Roy Whyte (CAP); 85 0.25%	Chuck Cadman

=== Maps ===
1. Abbotsford
2. Chilliwack-Fraser Canyon
3. Delta-Richmond East
4. Dewdney-Alouette
5. Fleetwood-Port Kells
6. Langley
7. Newton-North Delta
8. Richmond
9. South Surrey-White Rock-Cloverdale
10. Surrey North
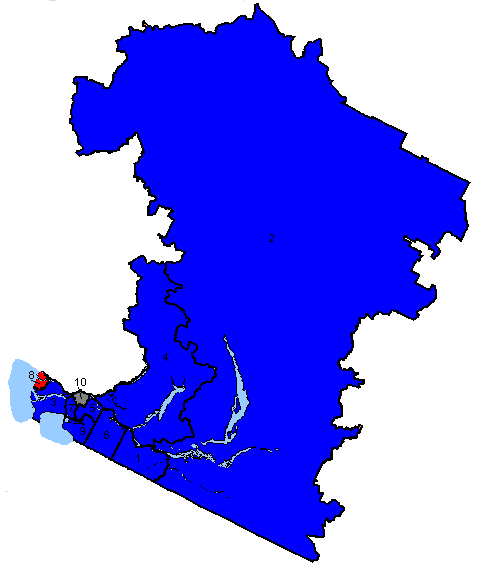
Key map

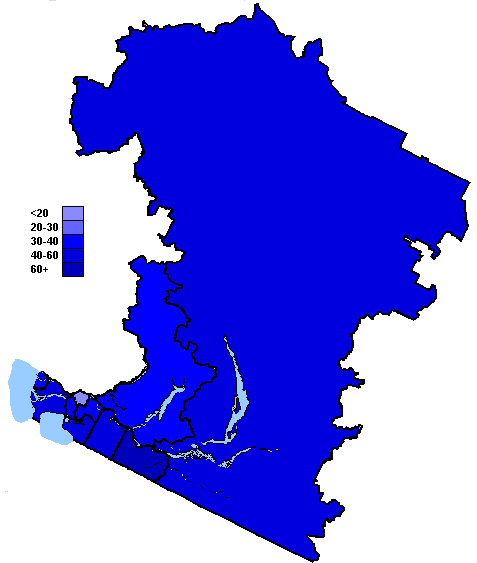
Conservative Party of Canada

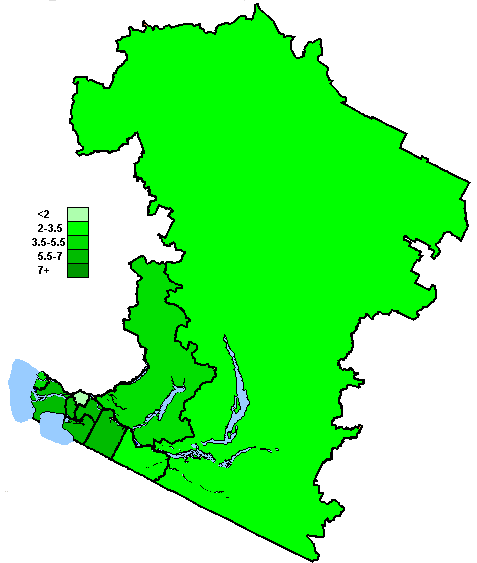
Green Party of Canada

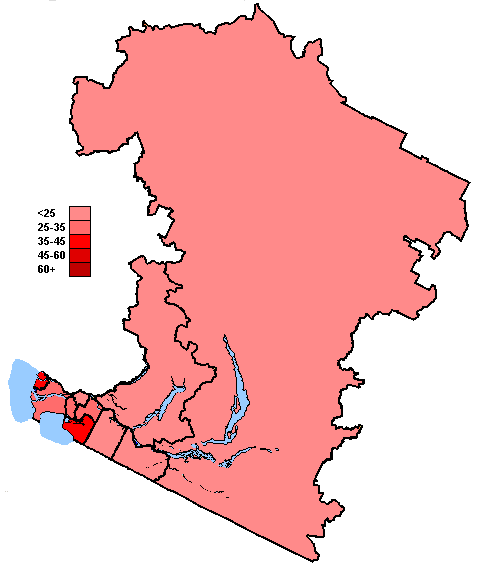
Liberal Party of Canada

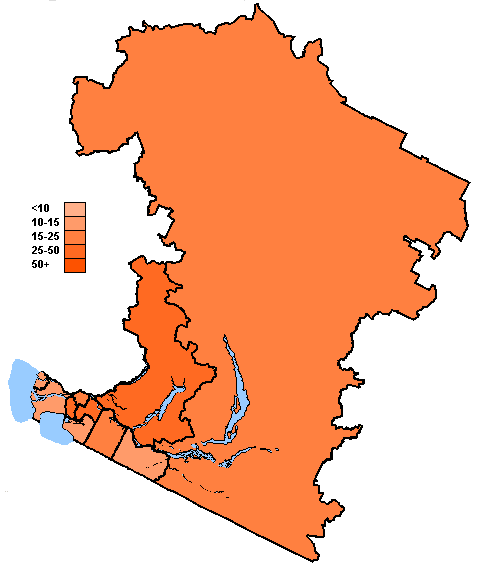
New Democratic Party
