= 338Canada =

Canadian political commentary website

- Available in: English
- Founded: 2017
- Country of origin: Canada
- Founder: Philippe J. Fournier
- Website: 338canada.com qc125.com

338Canada, also known as Qc125 in Quebec, is a Canadian political forecasting and commentary website that was founded in 2017. The website's name refers to the 338 federal constituencies that were represented in the House of Commons between 2015 and 2025. The website provides projections for Canadian elections, as well as French and American presidential elections.

== History ==
338Canada was founded by Philippe J. Fournier in 2017 as an electoral statistics and projections website. In 2020 and 2024, the site produced projections for the 2020 United States presidential election and the 2024 United States presidential election.

== Projections ==
The site creates federal projections, as well as projections for province-level ridings. Overall, the site has a 89.7% projection rate across 17 total provincial and federal elections, with the most accurate projection being in the 2024 Nova Scotia general election.
