= Burnaby South =

Defunct federal electoral district in British Columbia, Canada

British Columbia electoral district
- Location in the Lower Mainland

Defunct federal electoral district
- Legislature: House of Commons
- District created: 2013
- District abolished: 2025
- First contested: 2015
- Last contested: 2021
- District webpage: profile, map

Demographics
- Population (2016): 111,973
- Electors (2019): 79,849
- Area (km²): 46.08
- Census division: Metro Vancouver
- Census subdivision: Burnaby

Burnaby South (French: Burnaby-Sud) was a federal electoral district in British Columbia. It encompasses a portion of British Columbia previously included in the electoral districts of Burnaby—Douglas and Burnaby—New Westminster.

Burnaby South was created by the 2012 federal electoral boundaries redistribution and was legally defined in the 2013 representation order. It came into effect upon the call of the 42nd Canadian federal election, which took place in October 2015.

There was a by-election on February 25, 2019, to determine the Member of Parliament for Burnaby South, which was won by New Democratic Party leader Jagmeet Singh. The seat was vacated by Kennedy Stewart, who resigned in September 2018 and won the 2018 Vancouver municipal election in October to become the mayor of Vancouver.

The district was replaced by Vancouver Fraserview—South Burnaby and Burnaby Central for the 2025 Canadian federal election.

== Geography ==
As of the 2012 federal electoral boundaries redistribution, the district includes the southwestern portion of the City of Burnaby and the eastern portion of the city between the Trans-Canada Highway and Highway 7. More specifically...

Consisting of that part of the City of Burnaby described as follows: commencing at the intersection of the westerly limit of said city with Lougheed Highway (Highway No. 7); thence generally easterly along said highway to the easterly limit of said city at North Road; thence southerly along North Road to the Trans-Canada Highway (Highway No. 1); thence generally westerly along said highway to the northeasterly production of Nursery Street; thence southwesterly along said production and Nursery Street to 6th Street; thence northwesterly along said street to Burris Street; thence southwesterly along said street to Walker Avenue; thence southeasterly along said avenue to Stanley Street; thence southerly in a straight line to the end of Griffiths Avenue; thence southerly along said avenue to Griffiths Drive; thence generally southerly along said drive to the southerly limit of said city at 10th Avenue; thence generally westerly and northerly along the southerly and westerly limits of said city to the point of commencement.

== Demographics ==
Panethnic groups in Burnaby South (2011−2021)
Panethnic group	2021		2016		2011	
Panethnic group	Pop.	%	Pop.	%	Pop.	%
East Asian (Note: Statistic includes total responses of "Chinese", "Korean", and "Japanese" under visible minority section on census.)	51,350	43.09%	48,715	43.89%	40,780	39.14%
European (Note: Statistic includes all persons that did not make up part of a visible minority or an indigenous identity.)	30,005	25.18%	33,345	30.04%	36,685	35.21%
South Asian	12,705	10.66%	9,315	8.39%	8,645	8.3%
Southeast Asian (Note: Statistic includes total responses of "Filipino" and "Southeast Asian" under visible minority section on census.)	10,740	9.01%	8,985	8.09%	8,395	8.06%
Middle Eastern (Note: Statistic includes total responses of "West Asian" and "Arab" under visible minority section on census.)	3,720	3.12%	3,030	2.73%	2,805	2.69%
Latin American	3,155	2.65%	2,045	1.84%	1,855	1.78%
African	1,820	1.53%	1,265	1.14%	1,405	1.35%
Indigenous	1,765	1.48%	1,575	1.42%	1,460	1.4%
Other (Note: Statistic includes total responses of "Visible minority, n.i.e." and "Multiple visible minorities" under visible minority section on census.)	3,920	3.29%	2,710	2.44%	2,150	2.06%
Total responses	119,175	99.06%	111,000	99.13%	104,180	99.18%
Total population	120,305	100%	111,973	100%	105,037	100%
Notes: Totals greater than 100% due to multiple origin responses. Demographics based on 2012 Canadian federal electoral redistribution riding boundaries.

== Members of Parliament ==
This riding has elected the following members of the House of Commons of Canada:

Parliament	Years	Member	Party
Burnaby South; Riding created from Burnaby—Douglas and Burnaby—New Westminster
42nd	2015–2018	Kennedy Stewart	New Democratic
42nd	2019–2019	Jagmeet Singh	New Democratic
43rd	2019–2021	Jagmeet Singh	New Democratic
44th	2021–2025	Jagmeet Singh	New Democratic
Riding dissolved into Burnaby Central and Vancouver Fraserview—South Burnaby

== Election results ==
Graph of election results in Burnaby South (2011–, minor parties that never got 2% of the vote or didn't run consistently are omitted)

2021 Canadian federal election
Party	Candidate	Votes	%	±%	Expenditures
New Democratic	Jagmeet Singh	16,382	40.34	+2.67	$81,111.34
Liberal	Brea Huang Sami	12,361	30.44	+6.65	$97,095.22
Conservative	Likky Lavji	9,104	22.42	–8.50	$42,968.01
People's	Marcella Williams	1,290	3.18	+1.74	$5,043.08
Green	Maureen Curran	1,175	2.89	–2.61	$839.33
Independent	Martin Kendell	296	0.73	–	none listed
Total valid votes/expense limit		40,608	99.29	–	$110,662.02
Total rejected ballots		291	0.71	–0.21	
Turnout		40,899	51.07	–5.49	
Eligible voters		80,092			
New Democratic hold		Swing		–1.99	
Source: Elections Canada

2019 Canadian federal election
Party	Candidate	Votes	%	±%	Expenditures
New Democratic	Jagmeet Singh	16,956	37.68	–1.19	$94,274.04
Conservative	Jay Shin	13,914	30.92	+8.31	$101,861.19
Liberal	Neelam Brar	10,706	23.79	–2.21	$96,784.07
Green	Brennan Wauters	2,477	5.50	–	$901.27
People's	Al Rawdah	645	1.43	–9.21	none listed
Libertarian	Rex Brocki	246	0.55	–	none listed
Marxist–Leninist	Brian Sproule	62	0.14	–	none listed
Total valid votes/expense limit		45,006	99.08	–	$107,366.92
Total rejected ballots		417	0.92	+0.09	
Turnout		45,423	56.56	+26.59	
Eligible voters		80,312			
New Democratic hold		Swing		–1.70	
Source: Elections Canada

Canadian federal by-election, February 25, 2019 Resignation of Kennedy Stewart
Party	Candidate	Votes	%	±%	Expenditures
New Democratic	Jagmeet Singh	8,848	38.86	+3.79	$107,876.69
Liberal	Richard Lee	5,919	26.00	–7.88	$120,398.75
Conservative	Jay Shin	5,147	22.61	–4.51	$124,688.15
People's	Laura-Lynn Tyler Thompson	2,422	10.64	–	$87,790.22
Independent	Terry Grimwood	242	1.06	–	$5,983.61
Independent	Valentine Wu	190	0.84	–	$704.17
Total valid votes/expense limit		22,768	99.17	–	$132,377.49
Total rejected ballots		190	0.83	+0.23	
Turnout		22,958	29.96	–30.82	
Eligible voters		76,618			
New Democratic hold		Swing		+5.84	
Source: Elections Canada

2015 Canadian federal election
Party	Candidate	Votes	%	±%	Expenditures
New Democratic	Kennedy Stewart	16,094	35.07	–8.93	$177,796.68
Liberal	Adam Pankratz	15,547	33.88	+22.16	$33,613.38
Conservative	Grace Seear	12,441	27.11	–12.51	$83,392.49
Green	Wyatt Tessari	1,306	2.85	–0.76	$790.18
Libertarian	Liz Jaluague	499	1.09	–	none listed
Total valid votes/expense limit		45,887	99.40	–	$207,659.75
Total rejected ballots		275	0.60	–	
Turnout		46,162	60.78	–	
Eligible voters		75,950			
New Democratic hold		Swing		–15.55	
Source: Elections Canada

2011 federal election redistributed results
Party	Vote	%
New Democratic	16,072	44.0
Conservative	14,471	39.6
Liberal	4,280	11.7
Green	1,316	3.6
Others	385	1.1

== See also ==
- List of Canadian electoral districts
- Historical federal electoral districts of Canada
