= List of visible minority Canadian cabinet ministers =

The Cabinet of Canada has had 32 visible minorities appointed members. A visible minority is defined as "persons, other than Aboriginal people, who are non-Caucasian in race or non-white in colour".

Pierre De Bané became the first Visible Minority and Arab Canadian to hold a Cabinet position when he was appointed Minister of Supply and Services in 1978 by Prime Minister Pierre Trudeau. In 1979, Minister of Labour Lincoln Alexander became the first African Canadian appointed to the Cabinet. Hedy Fry became the first Visible Minority female cabinet member when she was appointed Minister for Status of Women and Multiculturalism in 1996. Raymond Chan became the first Chinese Canadian to hold a Cabinet Position when he was appointed Asia-Pacific Gateway Minister in 1993, while Herb Dhaliwal was the first South Asian Canadian minister, appointed Revenue Minister in 1997.

The Department of Multiculturalism has had the most visible minority cabinet ministers, with four. Prime Minister Justin Trudeau has appointed a total of 16 ministers of visible minorities to cabinet, the highest number as of 2025.

== Carney Cabinet (2025–present) ==
Image	Minister	Took office	Left office	Duration	Mandates	Notes
	Shafqat Ali MP for Brampton—Chinguacousy Park	13 May 2025	Incumbent	Incumbent	President of the Treasury Board (2025–present)	Ali is a Pakistani-Canadian and the first Pakistani-Canadian to be appointed to cabinet.
Minister Anand	Anita Anand MP for Oakville	14 March 2025	Incumbent	Incumbent	Registrar General of Canada and Minister of Innovation, Science and Industry (2025) Minister of Foreign Affairs (2025–present)	Anand was born in Kentville, Nova Scotia. Her parents were both physicians; her mother Saroj D. Ram was an anesthesiologist, and her father S.V. (Andy) Anand. Her father was from Tamil Nadu and her mother was from Punjab. Her family relocated to Ontario in 1985. She also served in Justin Trudeau's cabinet.
	Gary Anandasangaree MP for Scarborough—Rouge Park	14 March 2025	Incumbent	Incumbent	Minister of Crown–Indigenous Relations and Northern Affairs and Minister of Justice and Attorney General of Canada (2025) Minister of Public Safety (2025–present)	Anandasangaree is a Sri Lankan Tamil Canadian. Born in Sri Lanka, his parents separated in 1980 and he and his mother moved to Ireland. Though they attempted to return to Sri Lanka in 1983, the outbreak of the Black July anti-Tamil riots changed their plans and Anandasangaree and his mother travelled to Canada as refugees from Sri Lanka in August 1983. His father is Sri Lankan Tamil politician V. Anandasangaree; Anandasangaree is estranged from his father and has only met him twice since 1983. He also served in Justin Trudeau's cabinet.
	Lena Metlege Diab MP for Halifax West	13 May 2025	Incumbent	Incumbent	Minister of Immigration, Refugees and Citizenship (2025–present)	Diab was born in Halifax, the daughter of first-generation Lebanese immigrants. She moved to Lebanon at age 2 but then moved back to Halifax at age 11, escaping the Lebanese Civil War.
Minister Ehsassi	Ali Ehsassi MP for Willodale	14 March 2025	13 May 2025	60 days	Minister of Government Transformation, Public Services and Procurement (2025)	Ehsassi is one of the first two Canadians of Iranian heritage to be elected to Canadian federal parliament, with the other being Majid Jowhari, and the first Iranian-Canadian to sit in cabinet. Born in Geneva, Switzerland in 1970, his family relocated to New York City when he was 3-years-old, and then to North York, Ontario when he was 15-years-old. His maternal great-grandfather was Iranian statesman Abdolhossein Teymourtash, who was the first Minister of Court during the Pahlavi dynasty and Ehsassi's father was also an Iranian diplomat and worked in Iran's embassy in Switzerland when he was born. His family left Iran during the Iranian Revolution.
	Arielle Kayabaga MP for London West	14 March 2025	13 May 2025	60 days	Minister of Democratic Institutions and Leader of the Government in the House of Commons (2025)	Kayabaga was born in Bujumbura, Burundi; her family moved to Canada when she was 11 as refugees from the Burundian Civil War, living in Montreal for a year before moving to London, Ontario.
	Kamal Khera MP for Brampton West	14 March 2025	13 May 2025	60 days	Minister of Health (2025)	Khera is a first-generation Canadian who immigrated to Canada from Delhi, India, at a very young age. She also served in Justin Trudeau's cabinet.
	Marjorie Michel MP for Papineau	13 May 2025	Incumbent	Incumbent	Minister of Health (2025–present)	Michel is of Haitian descent. She is the daughter of Victoire Marie-Rose Sterlin and former Prime Minister of Haiti Smarck Michel.
Minister Sidhu	Maninder Sidhu MP for Brampton East	13 May 2025	Incumbent	Incumbent	Minister of International Trade (2025–present)	Sidhu is Indo-Canadian and originally came from the Punjab state in India. He has resided in Brampton for over 30 years.
Minister Valdez	Rechie Valdez MP for Mississauga—Streetsville	14 March 2025	Incumbent	Incumbent	Chief Government Whip (2025) Minister for Women and Gender Equality and Youth (2025–present)	Valdez was born to overseas Filipino workers in Kitwe, Zambia in 1980. Her family immigrated to Canada in 1989 and settled in Erin Mills neighbourhood in Mississauga, Ontario. Valdez is the first Filipino Canadian woman elected to the House of Commons and the first to sit in cabinet. As part of the new cabinet sworn in after the 2025 Canadian federal election, Valdez was also appointed Secretary of State (Small Business and Tourism). She also served in Justin Trudeau's cabinet.

== J. Trudeau Cabinet (2015–2025) ==
Image	Minister	Took office	Left office	Duration	Mandates	Notes
	Omar Alghabra MP for Mississauga Centre	12 January 2021	26 July 2023	2 years, 195 days	Minister of Transport (2021–2023)	Alghabra was born in Al-Khobar, Saudi Arabia to a Syrian family. His father, an architect, moved their family to Saudi Arabia in 1968. He moved to Toronto when he was 19 years old to attend school and completed his Bachelor of Engineering at Ryerson University.
	Anita Anand MP for Oakville	20 November 2019	14 March 2025	4 years, 114 days	Minister of Public Services and Procurement (2019–2021) Minister of National Defence (2021–2023) President of the Treasury Board (2023–2024) Minister of Transport and Minister of Internal Trade (2024–2025)	Anand was born in Kentville, Nova Scotia. Her parents were both physicians; her mother Saroj D. Ram was an anesthesiologist, and her father S.V. (Andy) Anand. Her father was from Tamil Nadu and her mother was from Punjab. Her family relocated to Ontario in 1985.
	Gary Anandasangaree MP for Scarborough—Rouge Park	26 July 2023	14 March 2025	1 year, 232 days	Minister of Crown-Indigenous Relations (2023–2025) Minister of Crown-Indigenous Relations and Northern Affairs and Minister responsible for the Canadian Northern Economic Development Agency (2024-2025)	Anandasangaree is a Sri Lankan Tamil Canadian. Born in Sri Lanka, his parents separated in 1980 and he and his mother moved to Ireland. Though they attempted to return to Sri Lanka in 1983, the outbreak of the Black July anti-Tamil riots changed their plans and Anandasangaree and his mother travelled to Canada as refugees from Sri Lanka in August 1983. His father is Sri Lankan Tamil politician V. Anandasangaree; Anandasangaree is estranged from his father and has only met him twice since 1983.
Minister Bains	Navdeep Bains MP for Mississauga—Malton	4 November 2015	12 January 2021	5 years, 69 days	Minister of Innovation, Science, and Economic Development (2015–2021)	Bains was born in Toronto in 1977 to Indian parents.
Minister Chagger	Bardish Chagger MP for Waterloo	4 November 2015	26 October 2021	5 years, 366 days	Minister of Small Business and Tourism (2015–2018) Leader of the Government in the House of Commons (2016–2019) Minister of Diversity, Inclusion and Youth (2019–2021)	Chagger's parents emigrated to Waterloo, Ontario from India in the 1970s. She is the first female Leader of Government in the House of Commons.
	Ahmed Hussen MP for York South—Weston	10 January 2017	14 March 2025	7 years, 63 days	Minister of Immigration, Refugees and Citizenship (2017–2019) Minister of Families, Children and Social Development (2019–2021) Minister of Housing, Diversity and Inclusion (2021–2023) Minister of International Development (2023–2025)	Hussen was born in Somalia. He immigrated to Canada as a refugee in 1993, settling in Toronto. Although not the first black Cabinet minister, Hussen is the first to be of immediate African descent.
Minister Ien	Marci Ien MP for Toronto Centre	26 October 2021	14 March 2025	2 years, 139 days	Minister for Women and Gender Equality and Youth (2021–2025)	Ien is a Black Canadian of Trinidadian descent. Ien was born in St. James Town and raised in Toronto.
Minister Khera	Kamal Khera MP for Brampton West	26 October 2021	14 March 2025	2 years, 139 days	Minister of Seniors (2021–2023) Minister of Diversity, Inclusion and Persons with Disabilities (2023–2025)	Khera is a first-generation Canadian who immigrated to Canada from Delhi, India, at a very young age.
Minister Martinez Ferrada	Soraya Martinez Ferrada MP for Hochelaga	26 July 2023	5 February 2025	1 year, 194 days	Minister of Tourism and Minister responsible for the Economic Development Agency of Canada for the Regions of Quebec (2023–2025)	Martinez Ferrada is Chilean Canadian and was born in Santiago, Chile in 1972. Her family came to Canada in 1980 after fleeing Chile, then controlled by dictator Augusto Pinochet.
Minister Monsef	Maryam Monsef MP for Peterborough—Kawartha	4 November 2015	26 October 2021	5 years, 356 days	Minister of Democratic Institutions (2015–2017) Minister of Status of Women (2017–2018) Minister of International Development (2019) Minister for Women and Gender Equality (2019–2021) Minister of Rural Economic Development (2019–2021)	Monsef is of Afghan descent and was born in 1985 in a hospital in Iran; as her parents were Afghan refugees rather than Iranian citizens, Monsef has never held Iranian citizenship and has always been an Afghan citizen. She immigrated to Canada with her family as a refugee in 1996.
	Mary Ng MP for Markham—Thornhill	18 July 2018	14 March 2025	5 years, 239 days	Minister of International Trade, Export Promotion, Small Business and Economic Development (2018–2023) Minister of International Trade, Export Promotion, and Economic Development (2023–2025)	Ng was born in British Hong Kong in 1968. In the 1976, Ng's family immigrated to Toronto, Canada from Hong Kong.
	Ruby Sahota MP for Brampton North	20 December 2024	14 March 2025	0 years, 281 days	Minister of Democratic Institutions and Minister responsible for the Federal Economic Development Agency for Southern Ontario (2024–2025)	Sahota was born in Toronto in 1979, after her parents arrived in Canada from Punjab, India in the late 1970s. She also served as Chief Government Whip in cabinet.
Minister Sajjan	Harjit Sajjan MP for Vancouver South	4 November 2015	14 March 2025	8 years, 130 days	Minister of National Defence (2015–2021) Minister of International Development (2021–2023) President of the King's Privy Council for Canada, Minister of Emergency Preparedness, and Minister responsible for the Pacific Economic Development Agency of Canada (2023–2025)	Harjit Singh Sajjan was born in Bombeli, in Hoshiarpur district of Punjab, India. He along with his mother and older sister immigrated to Canada in 1976 when he was five years old to rejoin their father, who had left for British Columbia two years prior to establish entrepreneurial infrastructure and produce companies in the industrial and agriculture sectors, respectively.
Minister Sohi	Amarjeet Sohi MP for Edmonton Mill Woods	4 November 2015	20 November 2019	4 years, 16 days	Minister of Infrastructure and Communities (2015–2018) Minister of Natural Resources (2018–2019)	Sohi was born in 1964 in the Banbhaura, Sangrur district in the Indian state of Punjab. Sponsored by an elder brother, he emigrated to Edmonton in 1981. Following his defeat in the 2019 Canadian federal election, Sohi returned to municipal politics and was elected as Edmonton's 36th mayor on October 18, 2021, becoming the first visible minority to serve as mayor. Jyoti Gondek was elected mayor of Calgary on the same day, with both Sohi and Gondek jointly sharing status as Canada's first Punjabi mayors of major cities.
Minister Valdez	Rechie Valdez MP for Mississauga—Streetsville	26 July 2023	14 March 2025	1 year, 232 days	Minister of Small Business (2023–2025)	Valdez was born to overseas Filipino workers in Kitwe, Zambia in 1980. Her family immigrated to Canada in 1989 and settled in Erin Mills neighbourhood in Mississauga, Ontario. Valdez is the first Filipino Canadian woman elected to the House of Commons and the first Filipino Canadian woman to sit in cabinet.
Minister Virani	Arif Virani MP for Parkdale—High Park	26 July 2023	14 March 2025	1 year, 232 days	Minister of Justice and Attorney General of Canada (2023–2025)	Virani is an Ismaili Muslim who was born in Kampala, Uganda in 1971, from a family with roots in Ahmedabad, Gujarat, India. His family came to Canada as refugees in 1972, after the expulsion of the Indian minority in Uganda by then-president Idi Amin.

== Harper Cabinet (2006–2015) ==
Image	Minister	Took office	Left office	Duration	Mandates	Notes
Minister Chong	Michael Chong MP for Wellington-Halton Hills	6 February 2006	27 November 2006	0 years, 294 days	Minister of Intergovernmental Affairs (2006) Minister of State (Sport) (2006)	Michael Chong was born in rural Ontario to a Chinese father and Dutch mother.
Minister Clement	Tony Clement MP for Parry Sound-Muskoka	6 February 2006	4 November 2015	9 years, 271 days	Minister of Health (2006–2008) Minister of Industry (2008–2011) President of the Treasury Board (2011-2015)	Tony Clement was born in England and is of mixed Cypriot and Syrian descent.
Minister Gosal	Bal Gosal MP for Bramalea-Gore-Malton	18 May 2011	4 November 2015	4 years, 157 days	Minister of State (Sport) (2011–2015)	Gosal is of Indian descent and emigrated to Canada in 1981.
Minister Oda	Bev Oda MP for Durham	6 February 2006	4 July 2012	6 years, 148 days	Minister of Canadian Heritage (2006–2007) Minister of State (Status of Women) (2006–2007) Minister for International Cooperation (2007–2012)	Bev Oda was born to Japanese parents in Thunder Bay. She is the first Japanese Canadian to be elected to House of Commons and first to serve in cabinet.
Minister Uppal	Tim Uppal MP for Edmonton-Sherwood Park	18 May 2011	4 November 2015	4 years, 157 days	Minister for Democratic Reform (2011–2013) Minister for Multiculturalism (2013–2015)	Tim Uppal is a Sikh born in New Westminster to Indian immigrant parents.
Minister Wong	Alice Wong MP for Richmond	18 May 2011	4 November 2015	4 years, 157 days	Minister for Seniors (2011–2015)	Alice Wong is a Chinese Canadian who immigrated to Canada in 1980. Alice Wong is the first Chinese Canadian woman to serve in cabinet.

== Martin Cabinet (2003–2006) ==
Image	Minister	Took office	Left office	Duration	Mandates	Notes
Minister Augustine	Jean Augustine MP for Etobicoke-Lakeshore	12 December 2003	19 July 2004	0 years, 219 days	Minister for Multiculturalism (2003–2004) Minister of State (Status of Women) (2003–2004)	First elected in 1993, she became the first black woman elected to Canadian Parliament. She was born in Grenada and immigrated to Canada in her youth.
	Raymond Chan MP for Richmond	20 July 2004	5 February 2006	1 year, 199 days	Minister for Multiculturalism (2004–2006)	Chan was the first Chinese-Canadian to serve in Cabinet. He also served in Jean Chrétien's cabinet.
Minister Dosanjh	Ujjal Dosanjh MP for Vancouver South	20 July 2004	5 February 2006	1 year, 199 days	Minister of Health (2004–2006)	Dosanjh was born in India and emigrated to Canada when he was 17. He served as Premier of British Columbia from 2000–2001 and was elected as an MP in 2004.
	Rey Pagtakhan MP for Winnipeg North	12 December 2003	19 July 2004	0 years, 219 days	Minister of Western Economic Diversification (2003–2004) Minister for Science & Technology (2003–2004)	Pagtakhan is a Filipino Canadian. He also served in Jean Chrétien's cabinet.

== Chrétien Cabinet (1993–2003) ==
Image	Minister	Took office	Left office	Duration	Mandates	Notes
Minister Augustine	Jean Augustine MP for Etobicoke-Lakeshore	26 May 2002	12 December 2003	1 year, 200 days	Minister for Multiculturalism (2002–2003) Minister of State (Status of Women) (2002–2003)	First elected in 1993, she became the first black woman elected to Canadian Parliament. She was born in Grenada and immigrated to Canada in her youth. She also served in Paul Martin's cabinet.
	Raymond Chan MP for Richmond	4 November 1993	8 January 2001	7 year, 65 days	Minister for the Asia-Pacific Gateway (1993–2001)	Chan was the first Chinese-Canadian to serve in Cabinet. He also served in Paul Martin's cabinet.
Minister Dhaliwal	Herb Dhaliwal MP for Vancouver-Burnaby	11 June 1997	12 December 2003	6 years, 184 days	Minister of National Revenue (1997–1999) Minister of Fisheries and Oceans (1999–2002); Minister of Natural Resources (2002–2003)	Raised in Canada since the age of six, Dhaliwal was Canada's first Indo-Canadian cabinet minister.
Minister Fry	Hedy Fry MP for Vancouver Centre	25 January 1996	27 January 2002	6 years, 2 days	Minister for Multiculturalism (1996–2002) Minister of State (Status of Women) (1996–2002)	First elected in 1993, Fry is of Trinidadian ancestry.
	Rey Pagtakhan MP for Winnipeg North	9 January 2001	12 December 2003	2 years, 338 days	Minister for the Asia-Pacific Gateway (2001–2002) Minister for Science & Technology (2002–2003); Minister of Veterans Affairs (2002–2003)	Pagtakhan was the first Filipino Canadian to be elected to the House of Commons and the first to be appointed to cabinet. He was born in Manila in the Philippines in 1935. Pagtakhan also served in Paul Martin's cabinet.

== P. Trudeau Cabinet II (1980–1984) ==
Image	Minister	Took office	Left office	Duration	Mandates	Notes
	Pierre De Bané MP for Matapédia—Matane	3 March 1980	29 June 1984	4 years, 118 days	Minister of Industrial Expansion (1980–1982) Minister of Fisheries and Oceans (1982–1984)	De Bané was born in Palestine of Lebanese descent.

== Clark Cabinet (1979–1980) ==
Image	Minister	Took office	Left office	Duration	Mandates	Notes
	Lincoln Alexander MP for Hamilton West	4 June 1979	2 March 1980	0 years, 271 days	Minister of Labour (1979–1980)	Lincoln Alexander was Canada's first black Cabinet Minister. He later served as Ontario's first black Lieutenant Governor between 1985 and 1991.

== P. Trudeau Cabinet I (1968–1979) ==
Image	Minister	Took office	Left office	Duration	Mandates	Notes
	Pierre De Bané MP for Matapédia—Matane	24 November 1978	3 June 1979	0 years, 191 days	Minister of Supply and Services (1978–1979)	De Bané was born in Palestine of Lebanese descent. He became Canada's first Visible Minority Cabinet minister upon his appointment in 1978.

== See also ==
- List of visible minority political party leaders in Canada
- List of visible minority politicians in Canada
- Cabinet of Canada
