= Richmond Centre—Marpole =

Federal electoral district in British Columbia, Canada

British Columbia electoral district
- Interactive map of riding boundaries from the 2025 federal election
- Coordinates: 49.169°N 123.160°W

Federal electoral district
- Legislature: House of Commons
MP
Chak Au
Conservative
- District created: 1987
- First contested: 1988
- Last contested: 2025
- District webpage: profile, map

Demographics
- Population (2021): 116,380
- Electors (2021): 74,640
- Area (km²): 44
- Pop. density (per km²): 2,645
- Census division: Metro Vancouver
- Census subdivision(s): Vancouver (part), Richmond (part)

Richmond Centre—Marpole (French: Richmond-Centre—Marpole; formerly Richmond Centre) is a federal electoral district in British Columbia, Canada, that has been represented in the House of Commons of Canada since 1988.

Under the 2022 Canadian federal electoral redistribution the riding was renamed. It gained much of the Marpole area from Vancouver Granville and Vancouver Quadra and lose the area south of Williams Road to Richmond East—Steveston.

== Geography ==
The electoral district comprises the part of:

1. A part of the City of Richmond (including Sea Island and Vancouver International Airport, Brighouse, and Terra Nova) to the west and north of the following boundary: commencing at the northern limit of said city with the Oak Street Bridge, thence southeasterly along said bridge and BC-99 to Cambie Road, thence west along said road to No. 4 Road, thence south along said road to Westminster Highway, thence west on said highway to No. 3 Road, thence south along said road to Williams Road, thence west along said road and its production to the western limit of the city; and
2. A part of the City of Vancouver (including Marpole) as described: commencing at the intersection of W 57 Avenue / Cambie Street, south along said street and its production to the southern limit of the city, thence along the city limit to the production of Angus Drive, thence north along said production and drive to SW Marine Drive, thence northwest along said drive to Angus Drive, thence north along said drive to W 57 Avenue, thence east along said avenue to the point of origin.

== Demographics ==
Panethnic groups in Richmond Centre (2011−2021)
Panethnic group	2021		2016		2011	
Panethnic group	Pop.	%	Pop.	%	Pop.	%
East Asian (Note: Statistic includes total responses of "Chinese", "Korean", and "Japanese" under visible minority section on census.)	67,130	62.92%	59,875	61.48%	50,315	54%
European (Note: Statistic includes all persons that did not make up part of a visible minority or an indigenous identity.)	18,355	17.2%	20,905	21.46%	26,680	28.64%
Southeast Asian (Note: Statistic includes total responses of "Filipino" and "Southeast Asian" under visible minority section on census.)	7,875	7.38%	6,775	6.96%	6,405	6.87%
South Asian	5,240	4.91%	4,190	4.3%	4,380	4.7%
Middle Eastern (Note: Statistic includes total responses of "West Asian" and "Arab" under visible minority section on census.)	1,950	1.83%	1,235	1.27%	925	0.99%
Latin American	1,150	1.08%	720	0.74%	870	0.93%
Indigenous	820	0.77%	685	0.7%	940	1.01%
African	780	0.73%	585	0.6%	625	0.67%
Other (Note: Statistic includes total responses of "Visible minority, n.i.e." and "Multiple visible minorities" under visible minority section on census.)	3,380	3.17%	2,430	2.49%	2,025	2.17%
Total responses	106,690	99.06%	97,395	98.98%	93,170	99.26%
Total population	107,707	100%	98,396	100%	93,863	100%
Notes: Totals greater than 100% due to multiple origin responses. Demographics based on 2012 Canadian federal electoral redistribution riding boundaries.

According to the 2021 Canadian census

Ethnic groups: 60.1% Chinese, 17.2% White, 6.1% Filipino, 4.9% South Asian, 1.8% Japanese, 1.3% Southeast Asian, 1.1% Latin American, 1% Korean, 1% Arab
Languages: 28.5% English, 25.4% Mandarin, 22.5% Yue, 3.2% Tagalog, 1.3% Min Nan, 1.1% Japanese, 1% Russian, 1% Punjabi
Religions: 56.3% No Religion, 30% Christian (12.5% Catholic, 1.2% Anglican, 1.1% Baptist, 1.1% United Church), 5.7% Buddhist, 3.3% Muslim, 1.6% Sikh, 1.3% Jewish, 1% Hindu
Median income: $32,800 (2020)
Average income: $45,480 (2020)

Retail trade and the service sector (professional, scientific, technical services) are the major sources of employment in Richmond. 44% of residents over the age of 15 years have obtained a university certificate or degree. The average family income is over $112,200. Unemployment is around 10.8%. This riding is home to many Asian-themed malls and other businesses, such as River Rock Casino Resort, Aberdeen Centre, Parker Place, Lansdowne Centre, CF Richmond Centre, McArthurGlen Designer Outlet Vancouver Airport and is also home to the Vancouver International Airport.

== History ==
The district was created in 1987 from parts of Richmond—South Delta. In 2003, more parts of Delta—South Richmond were added to it.

The 2012 electoral redistribution saw this riding renamed Richmond Centre and lost territory to Steveston—Richmond East for the 2015 election.

== Members of Parliament ==
This riding has elected the following members of Parliament:

Parliament	Years	Member	Party
Richmond; Riding created from Richmond—South Delta
34th	1988–1993	Tom Siddon	Progressive Conservative
35th	1993–1997	Raymond Chan	Liberal
36th	1997–2000	Raymond Chan	Liberal
37th	2000–2002	Joe Peschisolido	Alliance
37th	2002–2004	Joe Peschisolido	Liberal
38th	2004–2006	Raymond Chan	Liberal
39th	2006–2008	Raymond Chan	Liberal
40th	2008–2011	Alice Wong	Conservative
41st	2011–2015	Alice Wong	Conservative
Richmond Centre
42nd	2015–2019	Alice Wong	Conservative
43rd	2019–2021	Alice Wong	Conservative
44th	2021–2025	Wilson Miao	Liberal
Richmond Centre—Marpole
45th	2025–present	Chak Au	Conservative

== Election results ==
Graph of election results in Richmond Centre (minor parties that never got 2% of the vote or didn't run consistently are omitted) View source data.

=== Richmond Centre—Marpole, 2023 Representation Order ===
2025 Canadian federal election
Party	Candidate	Votes	%	±%	Expenditures
Conservative	Chak Au	23,532	49.56	+14.11	$120,676.52
Liberal	Wilson Miao	21,232	44.71	+6.13	$74,065.44
New Democratic	Martin Li	2,109	4.44	–15.94	$0.00
Green	Michael Sisler	420	0.88	–2.25	$477.30
People's	David Wang	193	0.41	–2.05	$247.26
Total valid votes/expense limit		47,486	100.0	–	$127,851.47
Total rejected ballots		332	0.69	–0.30	
Turnout		47,818	59.20	+12.98	
Eligible voters		80,777			
Conservative notional gain from Liberal		Swing		+3.99	
Source: Elections Canada

2021 federal election redistributed results
Party	Vote	%
Liberal	14,375	38.58
Conservative	13,211	35.45
New Democratic	7,593	20.38
Green	1,167	3.13
People's	918	2.46

=== Richmond Centre, 2015–present ===
2021 Canadian federal election: Richmond Centre
Party	Candidate	Votes	%	±%	Expenditures
Liberal	Wilson Miao	13,440	39.34	+10.87	$46,560.77
Conservative	Alice Wong	12,668	37.08	–11.56	$106,375.38
New Democratic	Sandra Nixon	6,196	18.14	+3.67	$7,576.20
Green	Laura Gillanders	1,109	3.25	–2.87	$3,975.22
People's	James Hinton	748	2.19	+0.80	None listed
Total valid votes/expense limit		34,161	100.00	–	$108,507.63
Total rejected ballots		340	0.99	+0.04	
Turnout		34,501	46.22	–6.75	
Eligible voters		74,640			
Liberal gain from Conservative		Swing		+11.22	
Source: Elections Canada

2019 Canadian federal election: Richmond Centre
Party	Candidate	Votes	%	±%	Expenditures
Conservative	Alice Wong	19,037	49.04	+4.84	$101,329.13
Liberal	Steven Kou	11,052	28.47	-12.89	$86,522.82
New Democratic	Dustin Innes	5,617	14.47	+2.97	$0.00
Green	Françoise Raunet	2,376	6.12	+3.23	$2,308.51
People's	Ivan Pak	538	1.39	–	$5,776.08
Independent	Zhe Zhang	197	0.51	–	$184.60
Total valid votes/expense limit		38,817	99.05		$102,820.08
Total rejected ballots		371	0.95	+0.38	
Turnout		39,188	52.97	-4.56	
Eligible voters		73,975			
Conservative hold		Swing		+8.86	
Source: Elections Canada

2015 Canadian federal election: Richmond Centre
Party	Candidate	Votes	%	±%	Expenditures
Conservative	Alice Wong	17,622	44.21	-13.86	$154,059.88
Liberal	Lawrence Woo	16,486	41.36	+22.61	$110,802.58
New Democratic	Jack Trovato	4,602	11.54	-6.66	$11,679.42
Green	Vincent Chiu	1,152	2.89	-2.10	$2,372.74
Total valid votes/expense limit		39,862	99.43		$202,743.02
Total rejected ballots		227	0.57	–	
Turnout		40,089	57.53	–	
Eligible voters		69,678			
Conservative hold		Swing		-18.23	
Source: Elections Canada

2011 federal election redistributed results
Party	Vote	%
Conservative	19,789	58.06
Liberal	6,391	18.75
New Democratic	6,203	18.20
Green	1,699	4.99

=== Richmond, 1988–2015 ===
2011 Canadian federal election: Richmond
Party	Candidate	Votes	%	±%	Expenditures
Conservative	Alice Wong	25,109	58.36	+8.54	$88,747.89
Liberal	Joe Peschisolido	8,027	18.66	–12.18	$56,664.57
New Democratic	Dale Jackaman	7,860	18.27	+6.47	$8,890.83
Green	Michael Anthony Wolfe	2,032	4.72	–1.70	$2,933.09
Total valid votes/expense limit		43,028	99.49	–	$91,788.54
Total rejected ballots		220	0.51	+0.06	
Turnout		43,248	50.50	–1.49	
Eligible voters		85,643			
Conservative hold		Swing		+10.36	
Source: Elections Canada

2008 Canadian federal election: Richmond
Party	Candidate	Votes	%	±%	Expenditures
Conservative	Alice Wong	21,359	49.81	+11.12	$80,325.58
Liberal	Raymond Chan	13,221	30.83	–12.00	$81,387.63
New Democratic	Dale Jackaman	5,059	11.80	–2.18	$14,125.69
Green	Michael Anthony Wolfe	2,753	6.42	+1.92	$1,900.20
Independent	Wei Ping Chen	395	0.92	–	$6,837.45
Independent	Dobie Yiu-Chung To	91	0.21	–	$1,813.01
Total valid votes/expense limit		42,878	99.55	–	$86,878.97
Total rejected ballots		192	0.45	+0.00	
Turnout		43,070	51.99	–4.29	
Eligible voters		82,850			
Conservative gain from Liberal		Swing		+11.53	
Source: Elections Canada

2006 Canadian federal election: Richmond
Party	Candidate	Votes	%	±%	Expenditures
Liberal	Raymond Chan	18,712	42.83	–1.65	$66,767.13
Conservative	Darrel Reid	16,904	38.69	+3.36	$73,990.34
New Democratic	Neil Smith	6,106	13.98	–1.03	$12,236.14
Green	Richard Gordon Mathias	1,967	4.50	+0.24	$3,003.78
Total valid votes/expense limit		43,689	99.56	–	$78,573.54
Total rejected ballots		194	0.44	–0.11	
Turnout		43,883	56.28	–0.41	
Eligible voters		77,979			
Liberal hold		Swing		–2.51	
Source: Elections Canada

2004 Canadian federal election: Richmond
Party	Candidate	Votes	%	±%	Expenditures
Liberal	Raymond Chan	18,204	44.48	+2.44	$64,433.53
Conservative	Alice Wong	14,457	35.33	–14.52	$65,716.31
New Democratic	Dale Jackaman	6,142	15.01	+0.00	$11,072.35
Green	Stephen H.F. Kronstein	1,743	4.26	+2.37	$160.50
Canadian Action	Allan Warnke	376	0.92	–	$492.28
Total valid votes/expense limit		40,922	99.45	–	$74,099.04
Total rejected ballots		226	0.55	+0.09	
Turnout		41,148	56.69	–5.01	
Eligible voters		72,585			
Liberal gain from Conservative		Swing		+8.48	
Source: Elections Canada

2000 Canadian federal election: Richmond
Party	Candidate	Votes	%	±%	Expenditures
Alliance	Joe Peschisolido	21,064	44.41	+8.44	$58,128
Liberal	Raymond Chan	19,940	42.04	–1.77	$63,896
New Democratic	Gail Paquette	2,695	5.68	–3.88	$10,941
Progressive Conservative	Frank Peter Tofin	2,578	5.44	–2.85	$4,329
Green	Kevan Hudson	897	1.89	+0.53	$61
Natural Law	Kathy McClement	164	0.35	–0.05	none listed
Marxist–Leninist	Edith Petersen	93	0.20	–0.02	$10
Total valid votes		47,431	99.54		
Total rejected ballots		218	0.46	–0.05	
Turnout		47,649	61.70	–3.19	
Eligible voters		77,226			
Alliance gain from Liberal		Swing		+5.10	
Source: Elections Canada

1997 Canadian federal election: Richmond
Party	Candidate	Votes	%	±%	Expenditures
Liberal	Raymond Chan	18,165	43.81	+6.76	$53,959
Reform	Adrian Wade	14,912	35.97	+5.06	$36,549
New Democratic	Sylvia Surette	3,964	9.56	+3.29	$13,680
Progressive Conservative	Larry Blaschuk	3,435	8.28	–10.77	$21,581
Green	Kevan Hudson	565	1.36	+0.78	$19
Christian Heritage	Randy Cliff	167	0.40	–0.08	none listed
Natural Law	Mark McCooey	164	0.40	–0.18	none listed
Marxist–Leninist	Dorothy-Jean O'Donnell	90	0.22	–	$225
Total valid votes		41,462	99.50		
Total rejected ballots		210	0.50	–0.16	
Turnout		41,672	64.89	–4.79	
Eligible voters		64,218			
Liberal hold		Swing		+0.87	
Source: Elections Canada

1993 Canadian federal election: Richmond
Party	Candidate	Votes	%	±%
Liberal	Raymond Chan	21,457	37.05	+14.25
Reform	Nick Loenen	17,900	30.91	+27.58
Progressive Conservative	Tom Siddon	11,033	19.05	–25.00
New Democratic	Sylvia Surette	3,633	6.27	–20.93
National	Fred Pawluk	2,271	3.92	–
Green	Kevan Hudson	336	0.58	+0.14
Natural Law	Kathy McClement	333	0.58	–
Independent	Judith Campbell	317	0.55	–
Christian Heritage	Clyde E. Vint	282	0.49	–0.74
Independent	Jerry Haldeman	166	0.29	–
Libertarian	Kerry Daniel Pearson	155	0.27	–0.49
Independent	John Edgar Square-Briggs	29	0.05	–
Total valid votes		57,912	99.34	
Total rejected ballots		387	0.66	+0.24
Turnout		58,299	69.68	–10.29
Eligible voters		83,668		
Liberal gain from Progressive Conservative		Swing		+19.63
Source: Elections Canada

1988 Canadian federal election: Richmond
Party	Candidate	Votes	%	±%
Progressive Conservative	Tom Siddon	25,559	44.05	–
New Democratic	Tom Beardsley	15,787	27.21	–
Liberal	Floyd Sully	13,231	22.80	–
Reform	Stuart Gilbertson	1,929	3.32	–
Christian Heritage	Brian Wilson	712	1.23	–
Libertarian	David W. Crawford	441	0.76	–
Green	Bryan Wagman	253	0.44	–
Communist	Homer Stevens	113	0.19	–
Total valid votes		58,025	99.58	
Total rejected ballots		245	0.42	–
Turnout		58,270	79.97	–
Eligible voters		72,868		
Progressive Conservative notional hold		Swing		–
This riding was created from parts of Richmond—South Delta, which elected Progressive Conservative candidate Tom Siddon in the previous election.
Source: Elections Canada

== Student vote results ==
A student vote is when schools participate and hold mock elections alongside federal elections.

Graph of student vote election results in Richmond Centre (minor parties that never got 2% of the vote or didn't run consistently are omitted) View source data.

=== 2021 ===
2021 Canadian federal election
Party	Candidate	Votes	%	±%
Liberal	Wilson Miao	440	27.26	+9.36
New Democratic	Sandra Nixon	407	25.22	–3.47
Conservative	Alice Wong	406	25.15	–3.12
Green	Laura Gillanders	280	17.35	–0.89
People's	James Hinton	81	5.02	+0.42
Total valid votes		1,614	100.00	–
Source: Student Vote Canada

=== 2019 ===
2019 Canadian federal election
Party	Candidate	Votes	%	±%
New Democratic	Dustin Innes	755	28.69	+6.93
Conservative	Alice Wong	744	28.27	-0.32
Green	Françoise Raunet	480	18.24	+6.19
Liberal	Steven Kou	471	17.90	-19.20
People's	Ivan Pak	121	4.60	New
Independent	Zhe Zhang	61	2.32	New
Total valid votes		2,632	100.00	–
Source: Student Vote Canada

=== 2015, Richmond Centre ===
2015 Canadian federal election
Party	Candidate	Votes	%	±%
Liberal	Lawerence Woo	1,023	37.16	+11.14
Conservative	Alice Wong	787	28.59	-3.4
New Democratic	Jack Trovato	599	21.76	-3.81
Green	Vincent Chiu	344	12.05	-4.35
Total valid votes		2,753	100.00	–
Source: Student Vote Canada

=== 2011, Richmond ===
2011 Canadian federal election
Party	Candidate	Votes	%
Conservative	Alice Wong	429	31.99
Liberal	Joe Peschisolido	349	26.02
New Democratic	Dale Jackaman	343	25.57
Green	Michael Wolfe	220	16.40
Total valid votes		1,341	100.00
Source: Student Vote Canada

== See also ==
- List of Canadian electoral districts
- Historical federal electoral districts of Canada
