= Tom Siddon =

Canadian politician (1941–2026)

The Honourable Tom Siddon PC

Member of Parliament for Richmond Richmond—South Delta (1979–1988) Burnaby—Richmond—Delta (1978–1979)
- In office October 16, 1978 – October 25, 1993
- Preceded by: John Reynolds
- Succeeded by: Raymond Chan

Minister of National Defence
- In office June 25, 1993 – November 4, 1993
- Prime Minister: Kim Campbell
- Preceded by: Kim Campbell
- Succeeded by: David Collenette

Minister of Indian Affairs and Northern Development
- In office February 23, 1990 – June 24, 1993
- Prime Minister: Brian Mulroney
- Preceded by: Pierre Cadieux
- Succeeded by: Pauline Browes

Minister of Fisheries and Oceans
- In office November 21, 1985 – February 23, 1990
- Prime Minister: Brian Mulroney
- Preceded by: Erik Nielsen
- Succeeded by: Bernard Valcourt

Personal details
- Born: Thomas Edward Siddon; November 9, 1941 Drumheller, Alberta, Canada
- Died: June 28, 2026 (aged 84) Kelowna, British Columbia, Canada
- Party: Progressive Conservative
- Profession: Businessman, academic

Thomas Edward Siddon, PC (November 9, 1941 – June 28, 2026) was a Canadian aerospace engineer and politician.

== Background ==
Born in Drumheller, Alberta, Siddon pursued engineering, graduating from the University of Alberta in 1963, followed by earning his Masters and Doctorate in aeroacoustics from the University of Toronto, Institute of Aerospace. He became a professor at the University of British Columbia and founded an aero-acoustics firm, Siddon-Harford & Associates.

Siddon married Patricia Yackimetz in 1962, with whom he had five children. Yackimetz is the niece of Canadian-American psychologist Albert Bandura. Siddon died on June 28, 2026, at the age of 84.

== Political career ==
After serving as City Councillor in Richmond, British Columbia, for two years, he was first elected to parliament in a 1978 by-election as a Progressive Conservative Member of Parliament (MP) to represent the British Columbia riding of Burnaby—Richmond—Delta. He was successively elected in five federal elections between 1978 and 1993, and worked under several prime ministers.

When Brian Mulroney became leader of the PC Party, Siddon was appointed the party's science critic in the shadow cabinet. After the Tories won the 1984 election, he was given the post of Secretary of State for Science and Technology. During his time in this role, he established the foundation for the Canadian Space Agency and signed the International Space Station Agreement with the United States in 1984.

Siddon was promoted to the Minister of Fisheries and Oceans position in 1985, in the wake of the tunagate scandal that had forced the resignation of previous minister, John Fraser.

He remained in the Fisheries post for five years, until February 23, 1990. In response to overfishing and its consequences on fish stocks, Siddon attempted to impose stiff quotas on the catch. In 1991, a complete moratorium on cod fishing had to be imposed.

In 1990, Siddon moved to the Minister of Indian Affairs and Northern Development position. Shortly after his swearing-in, Siddon worked alongside his provincial counterpart John Ciaccia, to address the Oka Crisis.

As Minister of Indian Affairs, Siddon helped conclude the agreement in 1992 to create the new territory of Nunavut, the signing of the Saskatchewan Treaty Land Entitlement Framework Agreement, the signing of the Yukon Umbrella Final Agreement, and the establishment of the British Columbia Treaty Process.

When fellow British Columbian and ally Kim Campbell became PC leader and prime minister in 1993, Siddon was promoted to the senior cabinet, becoming Minister of National Defence on June 25, 1993. In this role, he was responsible for ordering new EH-101 navy helicopters to replace the aging Sea King helicopters. The deal was finalized, but during the next election, the opposition Liberal Party of Canada argued that the helicopters were too expensive.

Siddon entered the 1993 election and ended up finishing third behind Raymond Chan of the Liberal Party and Nick Loenen of Reform.

== After federal politics ==
Siddon returned to the private sector, but remained active in Tory politics. He supported Peter MacKay's leadership bid in 2003, and later became an early advocate of union between the Tories and Canadian Alliance.

Following his federal political career, Siddon remained active as a consultant, lecturer. and corporate board member. He spoke frequently on the political challenges of combating global climate change and the long range implications for water supply management. Siddon was the founding chair of the Okanagan Water Stewardship Council, and a member of the RBC Blue Water Advisory Panel. In 2007, he was awarded a Doctorate of Laws from the University of British Columbia Okanagan, received the University of Alberta Honour Award in 2009, the 2010 UBC Alumni Award of Distinction, and was the 2017 recipient of the University of Toronto Engineering Alumni Hall of Distinction Award.

He made a return to politics when he was elected to the Board of Education in Penticton, BC in November 2008. His campaign was based on more openness by the board with fewer in-camera meetings. Siddon was also a strong vocal opponent to the board's decision to tear down a historic auditorium and gymnasium in the local high school. Following a successful three years on the School Board, in 2011 Siddon decided not to seek re-election, but rather ran for the position of Area 'D' Director for the Regional District of Okanagan Similkameen. Siddon defeated his two contenders, receiving 50.5% support in ballots cast. In 2014 he was re-elected as Area 'D' Director.

In February 2018, Siddon announced that he would be retiring from politics, and that he would not be seeking re-election in October 2018.

== Lawsuit ==
Siddon was successful in settling out of court after suing radio commentator Rafe Mair for defamation in January 1995. Mair publicly apologized for comments made towards Siddon and settled the claims out of court.

== Electoral history ==
1993 Canadian federal election: Richmond
Party	Candidate	Votes	%	±%
Liberal	Raymond Chan	21,457	37.05	+14.25
Reform	Nick Loenen	17,900	30.91	+27.58
Progressive Conservative	Tom Siddon	11,033	19.05	–25.00
New Democratic	Sylvia Surette	3,633	6.27	–20.93
National	Fred Pawluk	2,271	3.92	–
Green	Kevan Hudson	336	0.58	+0.14
Natural Law	Kathy McClement	333	0.58	–
Independent	Judith Campbell	317	0.55	–
Christian Heritage	Clyde E. Vint	282	0.49	–0.74
Independent	Jerry Haldeman	166	0.29	–
Libertarian	Kerry Daniel Pearson	155	0.27	–0.49
Independent	John Edgar Square-Briggs	29	0.05	–
Total valid votes		57,912	99.34	
Total rejected ballots		387	0.66	+0.24
Turnout		58,299	69.68	–10.29
Eligible voters		83,668		
Liberal gain from Progressive Conservative		Swing		+19.63
Source: Elections Canada

1988 Canadian federal election: Richmond
Party	Candidate	Votes	%	±%
Progressive Conservative	Tom Siddon	25,559	44.05	–
New Democratic	Tom Beardsley	15,787	27.21	–
Liberal	Floyd Sully	13,231	22.80	–
Reform	Stuart Gilbertson	1,929	3.32	–
Christian Heritage	Brian Wilson	712	1.23	–
Libertarian	David W. Crawford	441	0.76	–
Green	Bryan Wagman	253	0.44	–
Communist	Homer Stevens	113	0.19	–
Total valid votes		58,025	99.58	
Total rejected ballots		245	0.42	–
Turnout		58,270	79.97	–
Eligible voters		72,868		
Progressive Conservative notional hold		Swing		–
This riding was created from parts of Richmond—South Delta, which elected Progressive Conservative candidate Tom Siddon in the previous election.
Source: Elections Canada

1984 Canadian federal election
Party	Candidate	Votes	%	±%
Progressive Conservative	Tom Siddon	38,168	57.06	+5.08
New Democratic	Ron Dickson	16,377	24.48	+0.25
Liberal	Rod Drennan	13,340	19.94	-3.45
Green	Geraldine Stevens	433	0.65	–
Independent	Ursula Graf	301	0.45	–
Confederation of Regions	Rob Sinclaire	273	0.41	–
Total valid votes		66,892	100.0	
Progressive Conservative hold		Swing		+2.42

1980 Canadian federal election
Party	Candidate	Votes	%	±%
Progressive Conservative	Tom Siddon	29,192	51.98	-2.06
New Democratic	Mercia Stickney	13,606	24.23	+0.08
Liberal	Glen MacRae	13,134	23.39	+1.96
Communist	Homer Stevens	170	0.30	+0.01
Marxist–Leninist	Elaine Johannson	61	0.11	+0.02
Total valid votes		56,163	100.0	
Progressive Conservative hold		Swing		-1.07

1979 Canadian federal election
Party	Candidate	Votes	%
Progressive Conservative	Tom Siddon	30,262	54.04
New Democratic	Mercia Stickney	13,524	24.15
Liberal	Glen Gordon MacRae	12,003	21.43
Communist	Homer Stevens	164	0.29
Marxist–Leninist	Allen H. Soroka	45	0.09
Total valid votes		55,998	100.0
This riding was created from parts of Burnaby—Richmond—Delta, where Progressive Conservative Tom Siddon was the incumbent. Canadian federal by-election, 16 October 1978 On the resignation of John Reynolds, 5 September 1977: Party / Candidate / Votes / % / ±%; Progressive Conservative / Tom Siddon / 30,395 / 63.48 / +8.67; New Democratic / Mercia Stickney / 11,308 / 23.62 / +7.34; Liberal / Tony Schmand / 4,713 / 9.84 / -18.47; Independent / Ernie Lecours / 1,128 / 2.36 / –; Communist / Homer Stevens / 339 / 0.71 / +0.23; Total valid votes / / 47,883 / 100.0; Progressive Conservative hold / / Swing / / +0.66
