= Peschisolido =

Peschisolido is an Italian surname. Notable people with the surname include:

- Joe Peschisolido (born 1963), Canadian lawyer and politician
- Paul Peschisolido (born 1971), Canadian soccer manager and player
