= Raymond Chan (politician) =

Canadian politician (born 1951)

The Honourable Raymond Chan PC
- 陳卓愉

Member of Parliament for Richmond
- In office 2004–2008
- Preceded by: Joe Peschisolido
- Succeeded by: Alice Wong
- In office 1993–2000
- Preceded by: Tom Siddon
- Succeeded by: Joe Peschisolido

Personal details
- Born: October 25, 1951 (age 75) Hong Kong
- Party: Liberal
- Spouse(s): divorced and re-married
- Education: University of British Columbia
- Profession: Engineer

Raymond Chan PC (Chinese: 陳卓愉; pinyin: Chén Zhuōyú; Jyutping: Can4 Ceok3 Jyu4; born October 25, 1951) is a Canadian engineer and politician. A member of the Liberal Party of Canada, he represented the electoral district of Richmond in the House of Commons of Canada from 1993 to 2000, and from 2004 to 2008. He is the first Chinese Canadian to be named to the Privy Council of Canada.

== Early life ==
Born in Hong Kong in 1951, Chan emigrated to Canada in 1969, two years after Canada liberalized its immigration policy. He received a B.A.Sc. degree in Engineering Physics from the University of British Columbia (UBC) in 1977, then worked as an engineer for TRIUMF, a particle accelerator laboratory at UBC, until 1993.

== Political career ==
Chan joined the Liberal Party of Canada in 1991 after serving as the inaugural president of the Vancouver Alliance in Support of Patriotic Democratic Movement in China. He was nominated as the Liberal candidate in the riding of Richmond over future cabinet colleague Herb Dhaliwal, who subsequently chose to run in the adjacent Vancouver South riding. He then defeated defence minister and incumbent Progressive Conservative candidate Tom Siddon in the 1993 election, becoming the third Chinese Canadian to be elected to the House of Commons after Douglas Jung in 1957, and Art Lee in 1974. He was subsequently appointed by Prime Minister Jean Chrétien as the Secretary of State for the Asia-Pacific Region for the Department of Foreign Affairs and International Trade.

He was re-elected in Richmond in the 1997 election, and retained his post as Secretary of State for the Asia-Pacific Region before losing to Joe Peschisolido of the Canadian Alliance in the 2000 election. He joined the private sector following his defeat, serving as president of Global Business Development Inc. After Peschisolido crossed the floor to the Liberal Party in 2002, Chan battled Peschisolido for the Liberal nomination, and won it after a fiercely contested race. He returned to Parliament in the 2004 election by defeating Conservative candidate Alice Wong and New Democratic Party candidate Dale Jackaman, and was subsequently appointed to the cabinet by Prime Minister Paul Martin as the Minister of State (Multiculturalism) for the Department of Heritage.

Chan was re-elected in 2006; with the Liberals forming the official opposition, Chan served variously as critic for the Canada Border Services, social economy, and the Asia-Pacific region in the 39th Parliament. In a rematch against Alice Wong and Dale Jackaman in the 2008 election, he lost to Wong by more than 8,000 votes. He then sought nomination as a Richmond Liberal again in 2009, but lost to Peschisolido. He has been a major fundraiser for political candidates since leaving office.

== Electoral history ==
2008 Canadian federal election: Richmond
| Party | Candidate | Votes | % | ±% | Expenditures |
|---|---|---|---|---|---|
| Conservative | Alice Wong | 21,359 | 49.81 | +11.12 | $80,325.58 |
| Liberal | Raymond Chan | 13,221 | 30.83 | –12.00 | $81,387.63 |
| New Democratic | Dale Jackaman | 5,059 | 11.80 | –2.18 | $14,125.69 |
| Green | Michael Anthony Wolfe | 2,753 | 6.42 | +1.92 | $1,900.20 |
| Independent | Wei Ping Chen | 395 | 0.92 | – | $6,837.45 |
| Independent | Dobie Yiu-Chung To | 91 | 0.21 | – | $1,813.01 |
| Total valid votes/expense limit | | 42,878 | 99.55 | – | $86,878.97 |
| Total rejected ballots | | 192 | 0.45 | +0.00 | |
| Turnout | | 43,070 | 51.99 | –4.29 | |
| Eligible voters | | 82,850 | | | |
| Conservative gain from Liberal | | Swing | | +11.53 | |
Source: Elections Canada

2006 Canadian federal election: Richmond
| Party | Candidate | Votes | % | ±% | Expenditures |
|---|---|---|---|---|---|
| Liberal | Raymond Chan | 18,712 | 42.83 | –1.65 | $66,767.13 |
| Conservative | Darrel Reid | 16,904 | 38.69 | +3.36 | $73,990.34 |
| New Democratic | Neil Smith | 6,106 | 13.98 | –1.03 | $12,236.14 |
| Green | Richard Gordon Mathias | 1,967 | 4.50 | +0.24 | $3,003.78 |
| Total valid votes/expense limit | | 43,689 | 99.56 | – | $78,573.54 |
| Total rejected ballots | | 194 | 0.44 | –0.11 | |
| Turnout | | 43,883 | 56.28 | –0.41 | |
| Eligible voters | | 77,979 | | | |
| Liberal hold | | Swing | | –2.51 | |
Source: Elections Canada

2004 Canadian federal election: Richmond
| Party | Candidate | Votes | % | ±% | Expenditures |
|---|---|---|---|---|---|
| Liberal | Raymond Chan | 18,204 | 44.48 | +2.44 | $64,433.53 |
| Conservative | Alice Wong | 14,457 | 35.33 | –14.52 | $65,716.31 |
| New Democratic | Dale Jackaman | 6,142 | 15.01 | +0.00 | $11,072.35 |
| Green | Stephen H.F. Kronstein | 1,743 | 4.26 | +2.37 | $160.50 |
| Canadian Action | Allan Warnke | 376 | 0.92 | – | $492.28 |
| Total valid votes/expense limit | | 40,922 | 99.45 | – | $74,099.04 |
| Total rejected ballots | | 226 | 0.55 | +0.09 | |
| Turnout | | 41,148 | 56.69 | –5.01 | |
| Eligible voters | | 72,585 | | | |
| Liberal gain from Conservative | | Swing | | +8.48 | |
Source: Elections Canada

2000 Canadian federal election: Richmond
| Party | Candidate | Votes | % | ±% | Expenditures |
|---|---|---|---|---|---|
| Alliance | Joe Peschisolido | 21,064 | 44.41 | +8.44 | $58,128 |
| Liberal | Raymond Chan | 19,940 | 42.04 | –1.77 | $63,896 |
| New Democratic | Gail Paquette | 2,695 | 5.68 | –3.88 | $10,941 |
| Progressive Conservative | Frank Peter Tofin | 2,578 | 5.44 | –2.85 | $4,329 |
| Green | Kevan Hudson | 897 | 1.89 | +0.53 | $61 |
| Natural Law | Kathy McClement | 164 | 0.35 | –0.05 | none listed |
| Marxist–Leninist | Edith Petersen | 93 | 0.20 | –0.02 | $10 |
| Total valid votes | | 47,431 | 99.54 | | |
| Total rejected ballots | | 218 | 0.46 | –0.05 | |
| Turnout | | 47,649 | 61.70 | –3.19 | |
| Eligible voters | | 77,226 | | | |
| Alliance gain from Liberal | | Swing | | +5.10 | |
Source: Elections Canada

1997 Canadian federal election: Richmond
| Party | Candidate | Votes | % | ±% | Expenditures |
|---|---|---|---|---|---|
| Liberal | Raymond Chan | 18,165 | 43.81 | +6.76 | $53,959 |
| Reform | Adrian Wade | 14,912 | 35.97 | +5.06 | $36,549 |
| New Democratic | Sylvia Surette | 3,964 | 9.56 | +3.29 | $13,680 |
| Progressive Conservative | Larry Blaschuk | 3,435 | 8.28 | –10.77 | $21,581 |
| Green | Kevan Hudson | 565 | 1.36 | +0.78 | $19 |
| Christian Heritage | Randy Cliff | 167 | 0.40 | –0.08 | none listed |
| Natural Law | Mark McCooey | 164 | 0.40 | –0.18 | none listed |
| Marxist–Leninist | Dorothy-Jean O'Donnell | 90 | 0.22 | – | $225 |
| Total valid votes | | 41,462 | 99.50 | | |
| Total rejected ballots | | 210 | 0.50 | –0.16 | |
| Turnout | | 41,672 | 64.89 | –4.79 | |
| Eligible voters | | 64,218 | | | |
| Liberal hold | | Swing | | +0.87 | |
Source: Elections Canada

1993 Canadian federal election: Richmond
| Party | Candidate | Votes | % | ±% |
|---|---|---|---|---|
| Liberal | Raymond Chan | 21,457 | 37.05 | +14.25 |
| Reform | Nick Loenen | 17,900 | 30.91 | +27.58 |
| Progressive Conservative | Tom Siddon | 11,033 | 19.05 | –25.00 |
| New Democratic | Sylvia Surette | 3,633 | 6.27 | –20.93 |
| National | Fred Pawluk | 2,271 | 3.92 | – |
| Green | Kevan Hudson | 336 | 0.58 | +0.14 |
| Natural Law | Kathy McClement | 333 | 0.58 | – |
| Independent | Judith Campbell | 317 | 0.55 | – |
| Christian Heritage | Clyde E. Vint | 282 | 0.49 | –0.74 |
| Independent | Jerry Haldeman | 166 | 0.29 | – |
| Libertarian | Kerry Daniel Pearson | 155 | 0.27 | –0.49 |
| Independent | John Edgar Square-Briggs | 29 | 0.05 | – |
| Total valid votes | | 57,912 | 99.34 | |
| Total rejected ballots | | 387 | 0.66 | +0.24 |
| Turnout | | 58,299 | 69.68 | –10.29 |
| Eligible voters | | 83,668 | | |
| Liberal gain from Progressive Conservative | | Swing | | +19.63 |
Source: Elections Canada

27th Canadian Ministry (2003–2006) – Cabinet of Paul Martin
Cabinet post (1)
| Predecessor | Office | Successor |
|---|---|---|
| | Minister of State (Multiculturalism); 2004–2006 | |
26th Canadian Ministry (1993–2003) – Cabinet of Jean Chrétien
Sub-Cabinet Post
| Predecessor | Title | Successor |
| | Secretary of State (Asia-Pacific) (1993–2001) | Rey Pagtakhan |
