= Kenny Chiu =

Canadian politician (born 1965)

- 趙錦榮
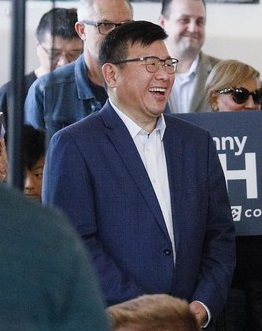

Richmond City Councillor
- Incumbent
- Assumed office 2026

Shadow Minister for Diversity, Inclusion and Youth
- In office September 7, 2020 – September 20, 2021
- Leader: Erin O'Toole
- Shadowing: Bardish Chagger
- Preceded by: Position established

Member of Parliament for Steveston—Richmond East
- In office October 21, 2019 – August 15, 2021
- Preceded by: Joe Peschisolido
- Succeeded by: Parm Bains

Personal details
- Born: 1964 or 1965 (age 61–62) British Hong Kong
- Party: Common Sense Alliance (since 2026)
- Other political affiliations: Federal: Reform (until 2000); Canadian Alliance (2000-2003); Conservative (since 2003); Municipal: Richmond Independent Team of Electors (2011-2014)
- Children: 2
- Education: University of Saskatchewan
- Profession: Software engineer

Chinese name
- Traditional Chinese: 趙錦榮
- Simplified Chinese: 赵锦荣
Transcriptions
Standard Mandarin
- Hanyu Pinyin: Zhào Jǐnróng
Yue: Cantonese
- Yale Romanization: Jiuh Gám-wìhng
- Jyutping: Ziu^{6} Gam^{2}-wing^{4}

Kenny Chiu (Chinese: 趙錦榮; born 1964 or 1965) is a Canadian politician who has served as city councillor for Richmond, British Columbia since 2026. He previously represented the riding of Steveston—Richmond East in the House of Commons of Canada from 2019 to 2021 as a member of the Conservative Party of Canada.

== Background and family ==
Born in Hong Kong, Chiu moved to Canada in 1982, finishing grade 12 in Winnipeg. He then studied computer science at the University of Saskatchewan, graduating with a bachelor of science degree in 1987 before returning to Hong Kong. He moved back to Canada in 1989 with his parents on a permanent resident visa, first settling in Saskatoon where he found work as a software engineer, then relocating to Richmond, British Columbia in 1992.

Chiu is married and has two daughters.

== Political career ==
Chiu joined the Reform Party of Canada in the late 1990s, serving as financial secretary for the party's Richmond riding association. The Reform Party became the Canadian Alliance in 2000, and Chiu served during that year's federal election as communication director for Joe Peschisolido, the Alliance's candidate in Richmond; Peschisolido went on to win the riding.

He was elected in the 2011 municipal election as a candidate with the Richmond Independent Team of Electors, serving one term as a Richmond School District trustee until 2014.

Chiu was acclaimed as the Conservative candidate in the 2015 federal election for the newly established riding of Steveston—Richmond East; he lost to Peschisolido, who switched to the Liberal Party in 2002. He ran again in the 2019 election, this time defeating Peschisolido, and was named Shadow Minister for Diversity, Inclusion and Youth in September 2020.

In the 2021 federal election, Chiu lost to Liberal candidate Parm Bains. Chiu was an outspoken critic of Beijing’s crackdown on dissent and protest in Hong Kong, which led to a state-sponsored disinformation campaign against him contributing to his defeat. A report by Global Affairs Canada stated that Chiu was targeted by social media accounts controlled by the China News Service. He sought the Conservative nomination for Richmond East—Steveston in the 2025 federal election, but was unsuccessful. He subsequently served as chief of staff to Chak Au, the member of Parliament for Richmond Centre—Marpole.

Chiu announced his candidacy for Richmond City Council under the "Common Sense Alliance" slate in July 2026, and was elected councillor in that October's municipal election.

== Electoral record ==
2021 Canadian federal election: Steveston—Richmond East
Party	Candidate	Votes	%	±%	Expenditures
Liberal	Parm Bains	16,543	42.47	+7.36	$101,930.66
Conservative	Kenny Chiu	13,066	33.55	–8.12	$88,909.23
New Democratic	Jack Trovato	7,525	19.32	+4.25	$9,430.58
People's	Jennifer Singh	955	2.45	–	$2,482.99
Green	Françoise Raunet	860	2.21	–4.88	none listed
Total valid votes/expense limit		38,949	99.08	–	$108,448.59
Total rejected ballots		363	0.92	–0.09	
Turnout		39,312	52.67	–4.28	
Eligible voters		74,641			
Liberal gain from Conservative		Swing		+7.74	
Source: Elections Canada

2019 Canadian federal election: Steveston—Richmond East
Party	Candidate	Votes	%	±%	Expenditures
Conservative	Kenny Chiu	17,478	41.66	+3.19	$98,359.86
Liberal	Joe Peschisolido	14,731	35.11	–9.97	$103,301.31
New Democratic	Jaeden Dela Torre	6,321	15.07	+2.93	$2,143.97
Green	Nicole Iaci	2,972	7.08	+3.41	$2,240.36
Independent	Ping Chan	449	1.07	–	none listed
Total valid votes/expense limit		41,951	98.98	–	$105,107.07
Total rejected ballots		431	1.02	+0.36	
Turnout		42,382	56.94	–3.30	
Eligible voters		74,428			
Conservative gain from Liberal		Swing		+6.58	
Source: Elections Canada

2015 Canadian federal election: Steveston—Richmond East
Party	Candidate	Votes	%	±%	Expenditures
Liberal	Joe Peschisolido	19,486	45.08	+26.48	$76,684.16
Conservative	Kenny Chiu	16,630	38.47	–15.44	$150,116.66
New Democratic	Scott Stewart	5,248	12.14	–10.68	$13,705.27
Green	Laura-Leah Shaw	1,587	3.67	–0.46	$1,891.69
Libertarian	Matthew Swanston	274	0.63	–	none listed
Total valid votes/expense limit		43,225	99.34	–	$204,726.35
Total rejected ballots		287	0.66	–	
Turnout		43,512	60.25	–	
Eligible voters		72,225			
Liberal notional gain from Conservative		Swing		+20.96	
Source: Elections Canada
