= Wilson Miao =

Canadian politician (born 1987)

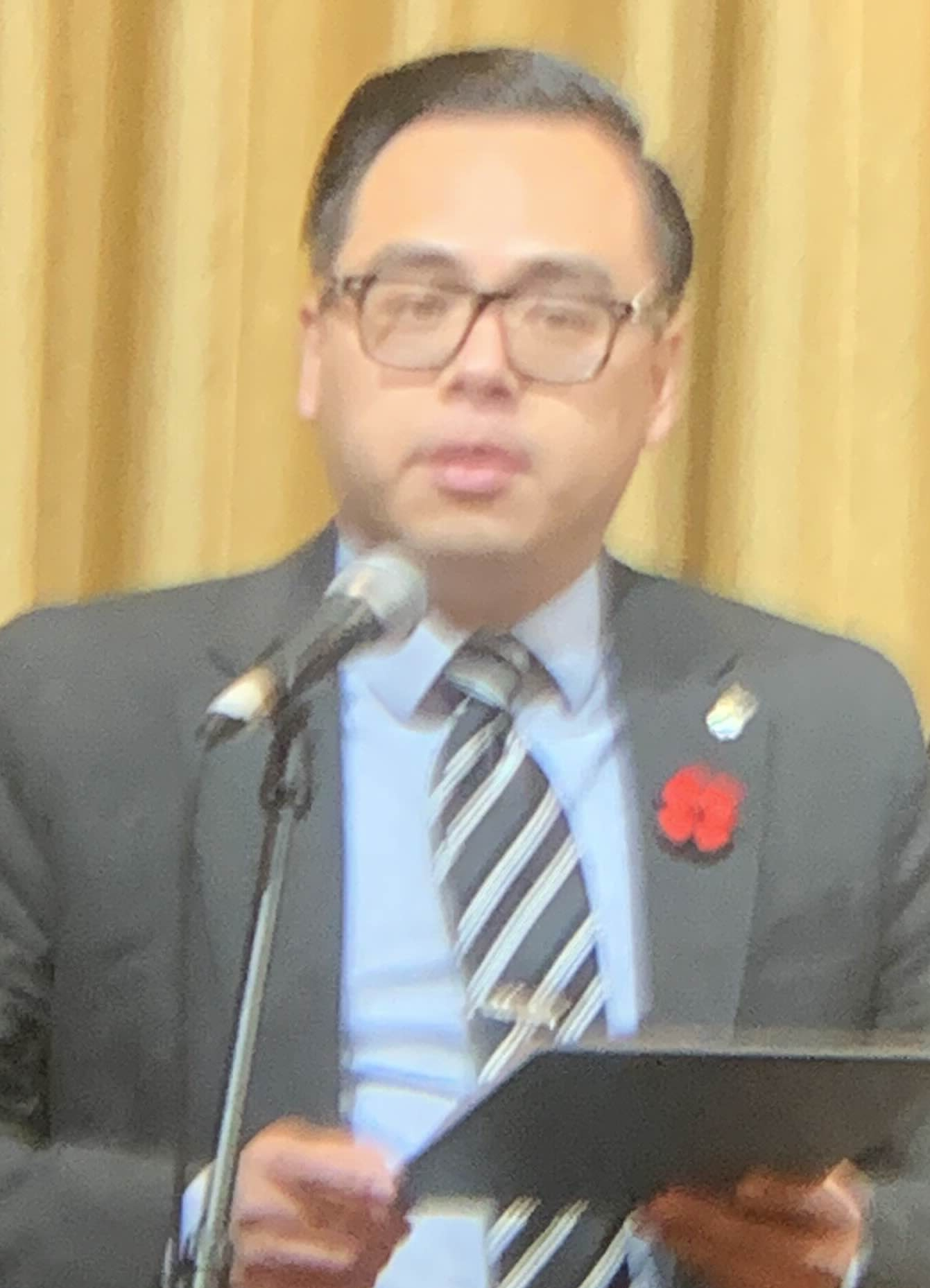
- Miao in 2024

Member of Parliament for Richmond Centre
- In office September 20, 2021 – March 23, 2025
- Preceded by: Alice Wong
- Succeeded by: Chak Au

Personal details
- Born: April 12, 1987 (age 39) Hong Kong
- Party: Liberal
- Education: Simon Fraser University
- Profession: Realtor

Chinese name
- Traditional Chinese: 繆宗晏
- Simplified Chinese: 缪宗晏
Transcriptions
Standard Mandarin
- Hanyu Pinyin: Móu Zōngyàn
Yue: Cantonese
- Jyutping: Mau^{4} Zung^{1}-ngaan^{3}

Wilson Miao (Chinese: 繆宗晏; born 12 April 1987) is a Canadian politician who served as the member of parliament (MP) for Richmond Centre from 2021 to 2025. He was elected to the House of Commons in the 2021 federal election as a member of the Liberal Party.

== Early life and education ==
Born in Hong Kong, Miao immigrated to Canada with his family in 1996, and grew up in Richmond, British Columbia. He attended Simon Fraser University, and graduated with a bachelor of business administration in 2011.

Prior to his election, he worked as a realtor for Macdonald Realty Westmar and as a dealing representative for Hoovest Financial Inc.

== Political career ==
Wilson Miao was elected as MP for Richmond Centre in the 2021 Canadian federal election, representing the Liberal Party of Canada. He defeated incumbent Conservative Alice Wong, who had held the seat since 2008. In his maiden speech in the House of Commons, Miao emphasized the importance of the House acting as a united front to “create real change and meaningful process”.

In January 2023, Miao opened his constituency office in Richmond Centre after 16 months without an office, and faced criticism for his lack of availability to his constituents during this period.

Miao's office accrued the largest renovation bill of any Member of Parliament in the period between October 2021 and October 2022. For the first half of 2023, Miao was the second highest spender on travel in the Liberal Party, spending a total of $91,769.07 despite not living in a remote location or holding a prominent role.

=== Parliamentary work ===
Miao was a member of the Standing Committee on International Trade and the Standing Committee on Veterans Affairs in the 44th Canadian Parliament.

- Standing Committee on International Trade (CIIT): Miao played a role in the modernization of the Canada-Ukraine Free Trade Agreement (CUFTA) from 2022 to 2023. He was also an active defender of Canadian industries during the Canada-United States-Mexico Agreement (CUSMA) review, ensuring that trade policies protect Canadian businesses and workers. Additionally, he has been a strong advocate for the Canadian softwood lumber industry, pushing for measures to safeguard the sector amidst ongoing trade disputes with the U.S.. Miao also actively defended Canadian industries during the Comprehensive and Progressive Agreement for Trans-Pacific Partnership (CPTPP) studies and advocated for the protection of the Canadian softwood lumber industry amidst ongoing trade disputes.
- Standing Committee on Veterans Affairs (ACVA): Miao contributed to the completion of the first-ever study on the experiences of women Veterans, titled "Invisible No More," shedding light on their unique challenges and recognizing their important sacrifice and contribution for Canada. He also played an essential role in examining veterans' benefits and commemoration practices, aiming to enhance support and recognition for veterans.

=== Legislative achievements ===
In February 2022, Miao introduced Private Member’s Bill C-244: An Act to amend the Copyright Act (diagnosis, maintenance and repair), a bill which amends the Copyright Act to allow consumers and businesses to diagnose, maintain, and repair products without violating copyright laws. The bill passed the House of Commons in October 2023, and received royal assent in November 2024. The bill was positively received by right to repair movement advocates in Canada.

== Allegations of Chinese election interference ==
In February 2023, the Globe and Mail reported that it had viewed classified Canadian Security Intelligence Service documents alleging that China's former consul general in Vancouver, Tong Xiaoling, stated that she helped defeat former Richmond Centre MP Alice Wong in the 2021 Canadian federal election where Miao was elected. Then-Federal Public Safety Minister Marco Mendicino rejected the allegations, and stated that "MPs Steveston—Richmond East MP Parm Bains and Miao are two hard-working colleagues who were elected by their respective constituents in their respective ridings by Canadians — and Canadians alone" and "we are confident in the integrity of the elections of 2019 and 2021".

In May 2023, former Canadian Armed Forces reservist Peter Liu posted a Facebook video making death threats against Miao. Liu's video showed screenshots of news articles which alleged that Miao benefitted from Chinese interference. The video then showed Liu stating that Miao was "a communist agent" and that "he will get what is coming to him", followed by Liu shooting a political pamphlet with Miao's face on it. In September 2024, Liu was sentenced to 60 days of house arrest for the incident.

== Electoral history ==
2025 Canadian federal election: Richmond Centre—Marpole
Party	Candidate	Votes	%	±%	Expenditures
Conservative	Chak Au	23,532	49.56	+14.11	$120,676.52
Liberal	Wilson Miao	21,232	44.71	+6.13	$72,215.44
New Democratic	Martin Li	2,109	4.44	–15.94	none listed
Green	Michael Sisler	420	0.88	–2.25	$477.30
People's	David Wang	193	0.41	–2.05	$247.26
Total valid votes/expense limit		47,486	99.31	–	$127,851.47
Total rejected ballots		332	0.69	–0.29	
Turnout		47,818	59.20	+13.02	
Eligible voters		80,777			
Conservative notional gain from Liberal		Swing		+3.99	
Source: Elections Canada

2021 Canadian federal election: Richmond Centre
Party	Candidate	Votes	%	±%	Expenditures
Liberal	Wilson Miao	13,440	39.34	+10.87	$47,260.77
Conservative	Alice Wong	12,668	37.08	–11.96	$106,375.38
New Democratic	Sandra Nixon	6,196	18.14	+3.67	$7,576.20
Green	Laura Gillanders	1,109	3.25	–2.87	$3,975.22
People's	James Hinton	748	2.19	+0.80	none listed
Total valid votes/expense limit		34,161	99.01	–	$108,507.63
Total rejected ballots		340	0.99	+0.04	
Turnout		34,501	46.18	–6.79	
Eligible voters		74,710			
Liberal gain from Conservative		Swing		+11.42	
Source: Elections Canada
