= Alice Wong (politician) =

Canadian politician (born 1948)

The Honourable Alice Wong PC
- 黃陳小萍
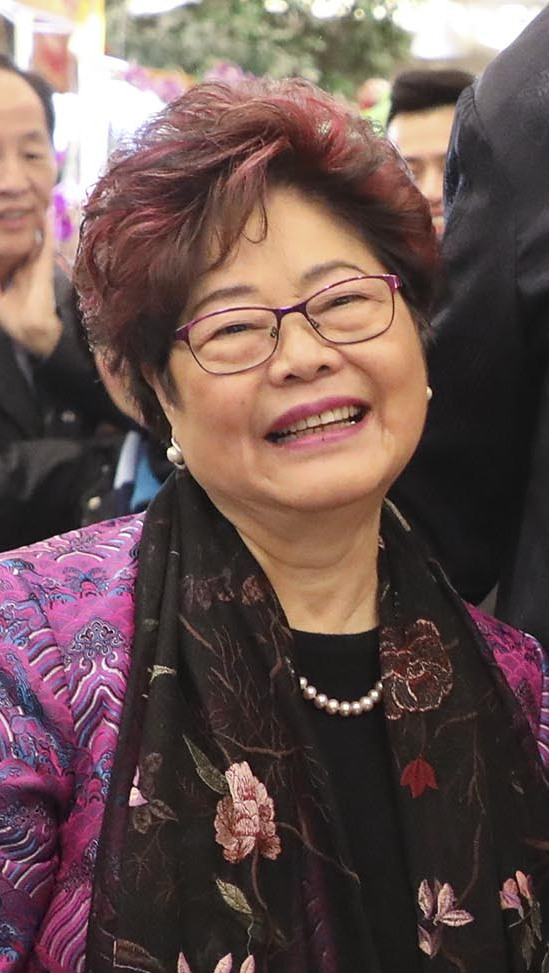
- Wong in 2018

Shadow Minister for Seniors
- In office August 30, 2017 – September 8, 2020
- Leader: Andrew Scheer; Erin O'Toole
- Shadowing: Jean-Yves Duclos; Filomena Tassi; Deb Schulte
- Preceded by: Mark Warawa
- Succeeded by: Rosemarie Falk

Shadow Minister for Small Business
- In office November 20, 2015 – August 29, 2017
- Leader: Rona Ambrose (interim); Andrew Scheer
- Shadowing: Bardish Chagger
- Preceded by: Brian Masse
- Succeeded by: Dan Albas

Minister of State for Seniors
- In office May 18, 2011 – November 4, 2015
- Prime Minister: Stephen Harper
- Preceded by: Julian Fantino
- Succeeded by: Jean-Yves Duclos (Minister of Families, Children and Social Development)

Member of the Canadian Parliament for Richmond Centre Richmond (2008–2015)
- In office October 14, 2008 – September 20, 2021
- Preceded by: Raymond Chan
- Succeeded by: Wilson Miao

Personal details
- Born: June 30, 1948 (age 78) British Hong Kong
- Party: Conservative
- Other political affiliations: Canadian Alliance (until 2003)
- Spouse: Enoch Wong
- Profession: Educator; entrepreneur
- Website: alicewong.ca

Chinese name
- Traditional Chinese: 黃陳小萍
- Simplified Chinese: 黄陈小萍
Transcriptions
Yue: Cantonese
- Yale Romanization: Wòhng Chàhn Síu-pìhng
- Jyutping: Wong^{4} Can^{4} Siu^{2} Ping^{4}

Alice Wong Chan Siu-ping PC (Chinese: 黃陳小萍; née Chan, born June 30, 1948) is a Canadian politician and a member of the Conservative Party who served as the member of Parliament (MP) for the electoral district of Richmond Centre from 2015 to 2021. She previously served as the MP for the Richmond riding from 2008 to 2015. In 2011, she was appointed by Prime Minister Stephen Harper to be Minister of State for Seniors, becoming the first Chinese-Canadian woman to serve in the Cabinet of Canada. She served in that position until 2015.

== Early life ==
Wong immigrated to Canada from Hong Kong in 1980. She is a businesswoman and educator. She holds a PhD in Instruction and Curriculum from the University of British Columbia and worked as the manager of international programs at Kwantlen Polytechnic University. She also has taught ESL and entrepreneurship classes at Vancouver Community College where she founded the Centre for Small Business at VCC, which offered the first bilingual small business management classes for immigrants. Wong has also operated a consulting firm specializing in research and education.

She has served on the boards of various community organizations including the Rotary Club of Richmond, Rosewood Manor in Richmond, Benevolent Relief Seniors Care Society, Ethno Business Council, Chiu Chow Benevolent Association, and the Women's Enterprise Society of BC. She is a guest host on local Chinese and multicultural radio and television. Wong founded the Richmond Greenspace Society to promote green space in urban settings, improving passport office efficiency, raising funds to improve the safety of senior pedestrians, and raising funds for the Sichuan earthquake relief. She has been married to her husband Enoch since 1982.

== Member of Parliament ==
Wong was first elected in 2008 in the riding of Richmond with 50% of the votes cast, compared to the incumbent Raymond Chan, who received 31%. In 2011, she was re-elected with 58% of the vote compared to 18% for her nearest rival. In 2015 she was re-elected in the riding of Richmond Centre with 44.2% of the vote compared to her nearest rival's 41.4%.

On May 18, 2011, Wong was appointed to Cabinet as Minister of State for Seniors. Reelected in 2015, she left the Cabinet as the Liberal Party gained a majority in the House of Commons.

She was re-elected in the 2019 federal election, but was excluded from new leader Erin O'Toole's Shadow Cabinet.

Wong was defeated in the 2021 Canadian federal election, losing Richmond Centre to Liberal Wilson Miao.

== Political views ==
In the fall of 2012, Alice Wong stated that the government's top priorities focuses on job creation, economic growth and long-term prosperity.

Wong refused to play a role in the Canada Summer jobs program over the human rights statement supporting abortion and LGBT rights.

=== Abortion ===
Wong is anti-abortion, and is a volunteer for the Campaign Life Coalition, a national organization which opposes abortion, same-sex marriage and gender identity legislation.

Wong voted in support of Bill C-233 - An Act to amend the Criminal Code (sex-selective abortion), which would restrict abortion access, making it a criminal offence for a medical practitioner to knowingly perform an abortion solely on the grounds of the child's genetic sex.

Abortion Rights Coalition of Canada has identified Wong's stance as anti-abortion.

=== Conversion therapy ===
On June 22, 2021, Wong was one of 63 MPs to vote against Bill C-6, An Act to amend the Criminal Code (conversion therapy), which was ultimately passed by majority vote, making certain aspects of conversion therapy a crime, including "causing a child to undergo conversion therapy."

=== Environment ===
Her environmental platform has been criticized by the opposition for her views regarding shark fin soup because she was seen publicly eating the soup at a news conference in October 2012. Many environmentalists condemn the process of shark finning. She said in a statement, "If a product such as shark fin is derived from a legal, humane and sustainable harvest, we see no basis to restrict its trade".

== Electoral record ==
2021 Canadian federal election: Richmond Centre
Party	Candidate	Votes	%	±%	Expenditures
Liberal	Wilson Miao	13,440	39.34	+10.87	$47,260.77
Conservative	Alice Wong	12,668	37.08	–11.96	$106,375.38
New Democratic	Sandra Nixon	6,196	18.14	+3.67	$7,576.20
Green	Laura Gillanders	1,109	3.25	–2.87	$3,975.22
People's	James Hinton	748	2.19	+0.80	none listed
Total valid votes/expense limit		34,161	99.01	–	$108,507.63
Total rejected ballots		340	0.99	+0.04	
Turnout		34,501	46.18	–6.79	
Eligible voters		74,710			
Liberal gain from Conservative		Swing		+11.42	
Source: Elections Canada

2019 Canadian federal election: Richmond Centre
Party	Candidate	Votes	%	±%	Expenditures
Conservative	Alice Wong	19,037	49.04	+4.84	$104,325.01
Liberal	Steven Kou	11,052	28.47	–12.89	$87,810.09
New Democratic	Dustin Innes	5,617	14.47	+2.93	none listed
Green	Françoise Raunet	2,376	6.12	+3.23	$2,308.51
People's	Ivan Pak	538	1.39	–	$5,776.08
Independent	Zhe Zhang	197	0.51	–	$184.60
Total valid votes/expense limit		38,817	99.05	–	$104,825.29
Total rejected ballots		371	0.95	+0.38	
Turnout		39,188	52.97	–4.56	
Eligible voters		73,975			
Conservative hold		Swing		+8.86	
Source: Elections Canada

2015 Canadian federal election: Richmond Centre
Party	Candidate	Votes	%	±%	Expenditures
Conservative	Alice Wong	17,622	44.21	–13.86	$154,059.88
Liberal	Lawrence Woo	16,486	41.36	+22.61	$110,802.58
New Democratic	Jack Trovato	4,602	11.54	–6.66	$12,850.92
Green	Vincent Chiu	1,152	2.89	–2.10	$2,372.74
Total valid votes/expense limit		39,862	99.43	–	$202,743.02
Total rejected ballots		227	0.57	–	
Turnout		40,089	57.53	–	
Eligible voters		69,678			
Conservative hold		Swing		–18.23	
Source: Elections Canada

2011 Canadian federal election: Richmond
Party	Candidate	Votes	%	±%	Expenditures
Conservative	Alice Wong	25,109	58.36	+8.54	$88,747.89
Liberal	Joe Peschisolido	8,027	18.66	–12.18	$56,664.57
New Democratic	Dale Jackaman	7,860	18.27	+6.47	$8,890.83
Green	Michael Anthony Wolfe	2,032	4.72	–1.70	$2,933.09
Total valid votes/expense limit		43,028	99.49	–	$91,788.54
Total rejected ballots		220	0.51	+0.06	
Turnout		43,248	50.50	–1.49	
Eligible voters		85,643			
Conservative hold		Swing		+10.36	
Source: Elections Canada

2008 Canadian federal election: Richmond
Party	Candidate	Votes	%	±%	Expenditures
Conservative	Alice Wong	21,359	49.81	+11.12	$80,325.58
Liberal	Raymond Chan	13,221	30.83	–12.00	$81,387.63
New Democratic	Dale Jackaman	5,059	11.80	–2.18	$14,125.69
Green	Michael Anthony Wolfe	2,753	6.42	+1.92	$1,900.20
Independent	Wei Ping Chen	395	0.92	–	$6,837.45
Independent	Dobie Yiu-Chung To	91	0.21	–	$1,813.01
Total valid votes/expense limit		42,878	99.55	–	$86,878.97
Total rejected ballots		192	0.45	+0.00	
Turnout		43,070	51.99	–4.29	
Eligible voters		82,850			
Conservative gain from Liberal		Swing		+11.53	
Source: Elections Canada

2004 Canadian federal election: Richmond
Party	Candidate	Votes	%	±%	Expenditures
Liberal	Raymond Chan	18,204	44.48	+2.44	$64,433.53
Conservative	Alice Wong	14,457	35.33	–14.52	$65,716.31
New Democratic	Dale Jackaman	6,142	15.01	+0.00	$11,072.35
Green	Stephen H.F. Kronstein	1,743	4.26	+2.37	$160.50
Canadian Action	Allan Warnke	376	0.92	–	$492.28
Total valid votes/expense limit		40,922	99.45	–	$74,099.04
Total rejected ballots		226	0.55	+0.09	
Turnout		41,148	56.69	–5.01	
Eligible voters		72,585			
Liberal gain from Conservative		Swing		+8.48	
Source: Elections Canada

== See also ==
- List of visible minority Canadian cabinet ministers
- List of visible minority politicians in Canada

28th Canadian Ministry (2006–2015) – Cabinet of Stephen Harper
Cabinet post (1)
Predecessor	Office	Successor
Julian Fantino	Minister of State for Seniors; 2011–2015	Filomena Tassi
