= Richmond—South Delta =

Former federal electoral district in British Columbia, Canada

British Columbia electoral district

Defunct federal electoral district
- Legislature: House of Commons
- District created: 1976
- District abolished: 1987
- First contested: 1979
- Last contested: 1984

Richmond—South Delta was a federal electoral district in the province of British Columbia, Canada, that was represented in the House of Commons of Canada between 1979 and 1988.

== History ==
This riding was created in 1976 from parts of Burnaby—Richmond—Delta riding.

== Members of Parliament ==
This riding elected the following members of Parliament:

Parliament	Years	Member	Party
Riding created from Burnaby—Richmond—Delta
31st	1979–1980	Tom Siddon	Progressive Conservative
32nd	1980–1984	Tom Siddon	Progressive Conservative
33rd	1984–1988	Tom Siddon	Progressive Conservative
Riding dissolved into Delta and Richmond

== Election results ==
1984 Canadian federal election
Party	Candidate	Votes	%	±%
Progressive Conservative	Tom Siddon	38,168	55.40	+3.43
New Democratic	Ron Dickson	16,377	23.77	–0.45
Liberal	Rod Drennan	13,340	19.36	–4.02
Green	Geraldine Stevens	433	0.63	–
Independent	Ursula Graf	301	0.44	–
Confederation of Regions	Rob Sinclaire	273	0.40	–
Total valid votes		68,892	99.78	
Total rejected ballots		154	0.22	+0.04
Turnout		69,046	77.47	+3.93
Eligible voters		89,127		
Progressive Conservative hold		Swing		+1.94
Source: Elections Canada

1980 Canadian federal election
Party	Candidate	Votes	%	±%
Progressive Conservative	Tom Siddon	29,192	51.98	–2.06
New Democratic	Mercia Stickney	13,606	24.23	+0.08
Liberal	Glen Gordon Macrae	13,134	23.39	+1.95
Communist	Homer Stevens	170	0.30	+0.01
Marxist–Leninist	Elaine Johannson	61	0.11	+0.03
Total valid votes		56,163	99.82	
Total rejected ballots		104	0.18	–0.02
Turnout		56,267	73.54	–4.66
Eligible voters		76,512		
Progressive Conservative hold		Swing		–1.07
Source: Elections Canada

1979 Canadian federal election
Party	Candidate	Votes	%
Progressive Conservative	Tom Siddon	30,262	54.04
New Democratic	Mercia Stickney	13,524	24.15
Liberal	Glen Gordon Macrae	12,003	21.43
Communist	Homer Stevens	164	0.29
Marxist–Leninist	Allen H. Soroka	45	0.08
Total valid votes		55,998	99.80
Total rejected ballots		113	0.20
Turnout		56,111	78.20
Eligible voters		71,749	
This riding was created from parts of Burnaby—Richmond—Delta, where Progressive Conservative Tom Siddon was the incumbent.
Source: Elections Canada

== See also ==
- List of Canadian electoral districts
- Historical federal electoral districts of Canada
