= Richmond East—Steveston =

Federal electoral district in British Columbia, Canada

British Columbia electoral district
- Interactive map of riding boundaries from the 2025 federal election

Federal electoral district
- Legislature: House of Commons
MP
Parm Bains
Liberal
- District created: 2013
- First contested: 2015
- Last contested: 2025
- District webpage: profile, map

Demographics
- Population (2021): 116,141
- Electors (2022): 74,641
- Area (km²): 89
- Pop. density (per km²): 1,305
- Census division: Metro Vancouver
- Census subdivision: Richmond (part)

Richmond East—Steveston (French: Richmond-Est—Steveston; formerly Steveston—Richmond East) is a federal electoral district in British Columbia. It encompasses a portion of British Columbia previously included in the electoral districts of Delta—Richmond East and Richmond.

Steveston—Richmond East was created by the 2012 federal electoral boundaries redistribution and was legally defined in the 2013 representation order. It came into effect upon the call of the 2015 Canadian federal election, scheduled for October 2015.

Under the 2022 Canadian federal electoral redistribution the riding was renamed.

== Geography ==
The riding consists of the components of the City of Richmond (including Steveston, South Arm, and Hamilton) to the east and the south of the following boundary: commencing at the northern limit of said city with the Oak Street Bridge, thence southeasterly along said bridge and BC-99 to Cambie Road, thence west along said road to No. 4 Road, thence south along said road to Westminster Highway, thence west on said highway to No. 3 Road, thence south along said road to Williams Road, thence west along said road and its projection to the western limit of the city.

== Demographics ==
Panethnic groups in Steveston—Richmond East (2011−2021)
Panethnic group	2021		2016		2011	
Panethnic group	Pop.	%	Pop.	%	Pop.	%
East Asian (Note: Statistic includes total responses of "Chinese", "Korean", and "Japanese" under visible minority section on census.)	51,855	50.98%	49,545	49.91%	43,865	45.63%
European (Note: Statistic includes all persons that did not make up part of a visible minority or an indigenous identity.)	21,110	20.76%	24,150	24.33%	27,365	28.47%
Southeast Asian (Note: Statistic includes total responses of "Filipino" and "Southeast Asian" under visible minority section on census.)	10,560	10.38%	8,745	8.81%	8,410	8.75%
South Asian	10,125	9.95%	10,175	10.25%	10,135	10.54%
Middle Eastern (Note: Statistic includes total responses of "West Asian" and "Arab" under visible minority section on census.)	1,925	1.89%	1,475	1.49%	1,280	1.33%
Latin American	1,010	0.99%	860	0.87%	810	0.84%
African	995	0.98%	685	0.69%	620	0.64%
Indigenous	720	0.71%	910	0.92%	995	1.04%
Other (Note: Statistic includes total responses of "Visible minority, n.i.e." and "Multiple visible minorities" under visible minority section on census.)	3,415	3.36%	2,725	2.75%	2,655	2.76%
Total responses	101,710	99.49%	99,265	99.35%	96,135	99.51%
Total population	102,230	100%	99,913	100%	96,610	100%
Notes: Totals greater than 100% due to multiple origin responses. Demographics based on 2012 Canadian federal electoral redistribution riding boundaries.

== Members of Parliament ==
This riding has elected the following members of the House of Commons of Canada:

Parliament	Years	Member	Party
Steveston—Richmond East; Riding created from Delta—Richmond East and Richmond
42nd	2015–2019	Joe Peschisolido	Liberal
43rd	2019–2021	Kenny Chiu	Conservative
44th	2021–2025	Parm Bains	Liberal
Richmond East—Steveston
45th	2025–present	Parm Bains	Liberal

== Election results ==
Graph of election results in Richmond East—Steveston (minor parties that never got 2% of the vote or didn't run consistently are omitted) View source data.

=== Richmond East—Steveston, 2023 representation order ===
2025 Canadian federal election
Party	Candidate	Votes	%	±%	Expenditures
Liberal	Parm Bains	25,705	48.45	+6.54	$125,732.93
Conservative	Zach Segal	24,605	46.38	+12.39	$128,731.43
New Democratic	Keefer Pelech	2,251	4.24	–15.14	$4,484.39
Green	Steven Ji	494	0.93	–1.41	$590.25
Total valid votes/expense limit		53,055	100.0	–	$129,548.56
Total rejected ballots		361	0.68	–0.24	
Turnout		53,416	63.58	+10.81	
Eligible voters		84,011			
Liberal notional hold		Swing		–2.93	
Source: Elections Canada

2021 federal election redistributed results
Party	Vote	%
Liberal	18,640	41.91
Conservative	15,117	33.99
New Democratic	8,622	19.38
People's	1,057	2.38
Green	1,043	2.34

=== Steveston—Richmond East, 2013 representation order ===
2021 Canadian federal election: Steveston—Richmond East
Party	Candidate	Votes	%	±%	Expenditures
Liberal	Parm Bains	16,543	42.47	+7.36	$107,393.91
Conservative	Kenny Chiu	13,066	33.55	–8.11	$88,909.23
New Democratic	Jack Trovato	7,525	19.32	+4.25	$9,430.58
People's	Jennifer Singh	955	2.45	–	$2,482.99
Green	Françoise Raunet	860	2.21	–4.87	none listed
Total valid votes/expense limits		38,949	100.00	–	$108,448.59
Total rejected ballots		363	0.92	–0.10	
Turnout		39,312	52.77	–4.17	
Eligible voters		74,503			
Liberal gain from Conservative		Swing		+7.74	
Source: Elections Canada

2019 Canadian federal election: Steveston—Richmond East
Party	Candidate	Votes	%	±%	Expenditures
Conservative	Kenny Chiu	17,478	41.66	+3.19	$98,603.15
Liberal	Joe Peschisolido	14,731	35.11	-9.97	none listed
New Democratic	Jaeden Dela Torre	6,321	15.07	+2.93	$2,143.97
Green	Nicole Iaci	2,972	7.08	+3.41	none listed
Independent	Ping Chan	449	1.07	–	none listed
Total valid votes/expense limit		41,951	98.98	–	105,107.07
Total rejected ballots		431	1.02	–	
Turnout		42,382	56.94	–	
Eligible voters		74,428			
Conservative gain from Liberal		Swing		+6.58	
Source: Elections Canada

2015 Canadian federal election: Steveston—Richmond East
Party	Candidate	Votes	%	±%	Expenditures
Liberal	Joe Peschisolido	19,486	45.08	+26.48	$76,684.16
Conservative	Kenny Chiu	16,630	38.47	-15.44	$152,116.66
New Democratic	Scott Stewart	5,248	12.14	-10.68	$12,292.51
Green	Laura-Leah Shaw	1,587	3.67	-0.46	$1,891.69
Libertarian	Matthew Swanston	274	0.63	–	–
Total valid votes/expense limit		43,225	99.34		$204,726.35
Total rejected ballots		287	0.66	–	
Turnout		43,512	60.25	–	
Eligible voters		72,225			
Liberal notional gain from Conservative		Swing		+20.96	
Source: Elections Canada

2011 federal election redistributed results
Party	Vote	%
Conservative	18,224	53.92
New Democratic	7,714	22.82
Liberal	6,287	18.60
Green	1,399	4.14

== See also ==
- List of Canadian electoral districts
- Historical federal electoral districts of Canada
