= United Fishermen and Allied Workers' Union =

International Fishermen and Workers Organization

U.F.A.W.U.
- United Fishermen and Allied Workers' Union
- Unifor logo

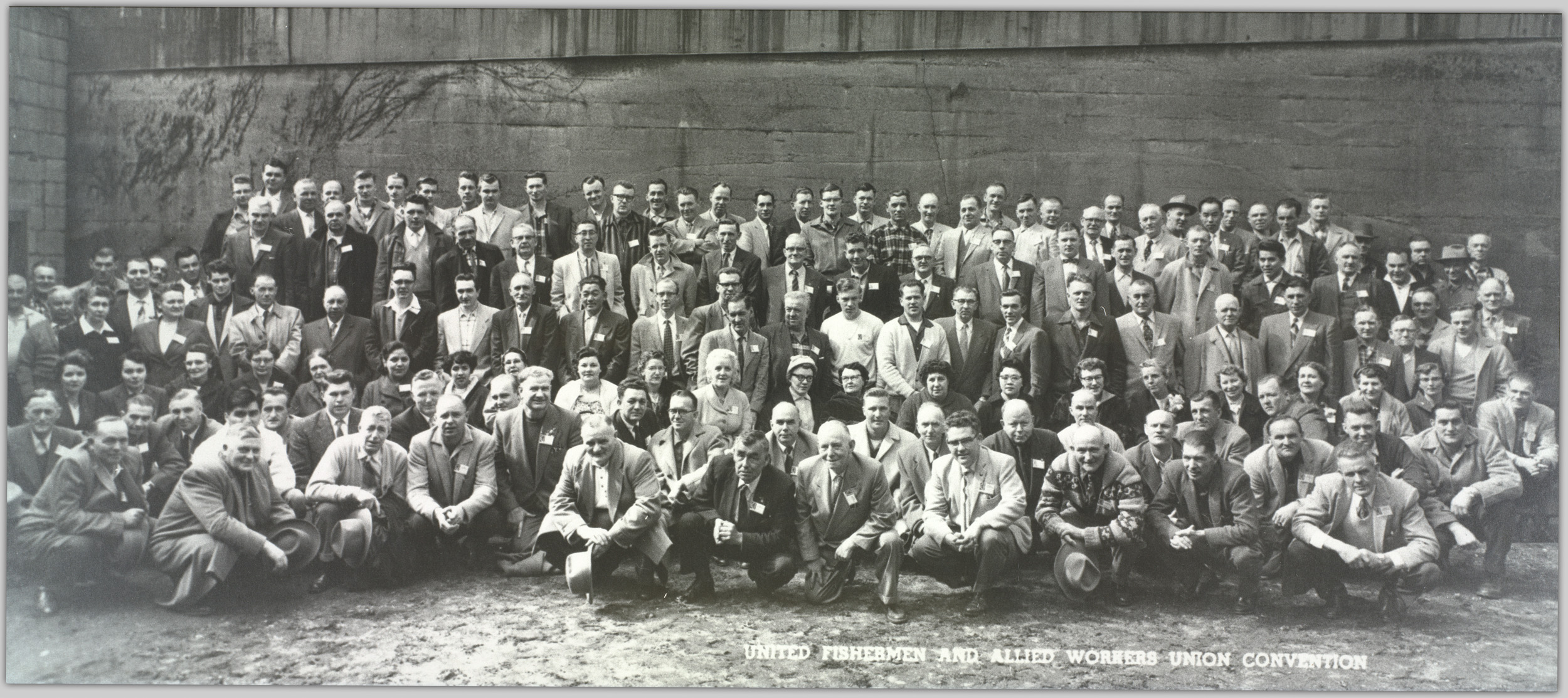
- Union convention, undated
- Merged into: Canadian Auto Workers
- Founded: 1945
- Headquarters: 830 14th Avenue; Campbell River BC; V9W 4H4
- Location: Canada
- President: James Lawson
- Vice President: Kyle Louis
- Secretary-Treasurer: Guy Johnston
- Parent organization: Unifor
- Affiliations: Trades and Labour Congress of Canada, Canadian Labour Congress, Japanese Citizens Association
- Website: ufawu-unifor.org

The United Fishermen and Allied Workers' Union was established in 1945 in British Columbia through the merger of the United Fishermen's Federal Union and the Fish, Cannery and Reduction Plant and Allied Workers Union. It represents fishermen, shoreworkers, and workers in fish processing and transport, and fought for improved wages and working conditions in the industry as well as the imposition of fishing quotas and licensing requirements. The union survived raiding wars with the British Columbia Gillnetters Association in 1952 and the Seafarers' International Union in 1953. Suspected of being under communist influence, it was suspended by the Trades and Labour Congress of Canada in 1953 and refused admittance to the Canadian Labour Congress until 1972. For example, a longtime president of the UFAWU, Homer Stevens, ran as the Communist Party candidate in the Burnaby-Richmond-Delta riding in the 1970s. The union also had a section in Nova Scotia. The UFAWU joined the Canadian Auto Workers in 1996. The UFAWU was an integral part of the working class fight from 1945 to 1967 and brought fishermen, shoreworkers and tendermen together to fight for one cause during this era which made helped make significant progress on equality within the workplace.

== Structure ==
=== Foundations ===
- A democratic system that elected its representatives.
- At formation had 3000 fishermen and 2000 shoremen. This increased to 8000 total in 1950 but has dropped ever since.
- Fishermen, shoreworkers and tendermen must all sign master agreements separately but in the same time frame.
- Participation from all within the union was always encouraged and was important to the functioning of the union as a result of its small money reserves.

==== Key Policy ====
- Racism and sexism was not tolerated and was combated fully from 1950 forward.
- Fishermen, shoreworkers and tendermen must all agree on agreements signed with companies or the government or the change would not be made. If an agreement could not be reached, each trade was then able to make an agreement separately.
- Contracts were negotiated by senior administrative officers and a committee of local representatives that would change each year based on location and issue.
- Represented boats with less than two crew members only.

==== Administration and their duties ====
- President and vice president were unpaid positions. The president was mainly a figurehead however the vice president focused mostly on administrative issues.
- Secretary treasurer and business agent were the only paid positions and did the work of daily administration, advertising and membership which were integral to the negotiations of master agreements.
- Local representatives volunteered their time to the union and represented their areas desires and advocated for them at meetings throughout the year.
- Majority of time spent by administration was used to sign new members up and advertise.

== Key Events Timeline ==
=== 1945 ===
- Women and Chinese represented in policy.

=== 1946 ===
- UFAWU welcomed to negotiate halibut fishing regulations.
- Homer Stevens becomes a union organizer.
- Represented on the fish price control board of Canada.
- Began allocating fish resources and lobbied the government to become involved.

=== 1948 ===
- Homer Stevens elected secretary treasurer.
- Buck Suzuki, a well known Japanese fishermen becomes an executive to show UFAWU support of the return of Japanese to the fishing industry.
- Became Affiliated with the Japanese Citizens Association.
- Herring canning came to an end and herring reduction became more important.

=== 1950 ===
- Began fighting the government to allow fishermen to be represented within the labour code of Canada.
- Demonstration in Victoria harbour.
- Campaign on racial inequality begins.

=== 1951 ===
- Female shoreworkers first pay increase.

=== 1952 ===
- The start of annual wage conferences.

=== 1953 ===
- Co-operative Commonwealth Federation decides to not affiliate itself with the UFAWU over communism concerns.
- Affiliated with The Communist Party of Canada.
- Barred from the Trade and Labour congress from 1953 to 1973 over communist leadership and affiliation.

=== 1954 ===
- Mickey Beagle is the first woman elected to office.

=== 1956 ===
- Won unemployment insurance for fishermen.
- Verna Parkins is elected as the first female president of the Prince Rupert UFAWU local.

=== 1957 ===
- Welfare plan available to all members.

=== 1959 ===
- Official policy that all three trades represented under the UFAWU must sign all agreements within the same time frame.
- Won reduction of monthly work hours to 40 hours a week as well as the introduction of overtime pay of shoreworkers.
- The introduction of brine systems and boats with refrigeration make tendermen almost obsolete.

=== 1967 ===
- UFAWU, Prince Rupert Fishermen's Co-op strike.

== Strikes ==
=== Introduction ===
Striking was a key way that UFAWU brought policy changes to its agreements between the government and various canning companies and their working class members. At its creation in 1945 UFAWU conducted strikes almost every year over the next two decades. Striking was common in the fishing industry prior to the 20th century with fishermen being some of the most militant labourers. After the UFAWU formed, fishermen and tendermen were much more active in trying to change policy than shoreworkers. Shoreworkers often backed fishermen during their strikes prior to 1950 without their own agenda. After 1949, shoreworkers began to strike for themselves, expecting fishermen to back them. The number of strikes the UFAWU took part in during over three decades is extremely high and the reasons vary seasonally. Key issues were often wage increases, seniority rights, benefits, human rights that included combating racism and sexism as well as an attempt to slow the wage gap between the seasonal and permanent workforce.

=== Notable Strikes ===
==== 1946 ====
The net menders of UFAWU canneries held a 29-day strike from May to July because of the pay difference between their trade and other shoreworkers. They also wished to shorten their work week to 40 hours. Although all the concessions they won are unclear, they signed a contract that included an increase in pay. This is significant because it was the first time the UFAWU signed a contract with female shore shoreworkers, which would soon become an entrenched policy.

==== 1947 ====
1947 was the first large strike after the formation of UFAWU. There was concern over fish prices across the entire industry as the prices were driven down but high demand as work was steadily increasing. This angered seasoned fishermen and the union voted for an industry wide strike. The strike was complicated when the trawling industry decided to strike before others which complicated things as they also wanted to end their strike early. The poor organization of this strike resulted in no gains in any area of the industry the UFAWU represented.

==== 1952 ====
1952s salmon strike is remembered as a key break in the relationship between The Native Brotherhood of British Columbia and UFAWU. When salmon prices were down at the opening of the 1952 season the UFAWU called for an industry wide strike. Prior to this the NBBC had usually picketed along with the UFAWU, this year however it saw resistance within its membership. The NBBC didn't have a strike mandate entrenched within its union policy and thus could not force its members to strike alongside the UFAWU. The UFAWU wanted to strike a deal with all workers during negotiations, including the Brotherhood, however the Brotherhood decided to negotiate its own negotiations without letting the UFAWU or its membership below senior coordinators know about its plan. Along with the NBBC and UFAWU, the Prince Rupert Fishermen's Co-op also decided not to respect picket lines for the first time and continued this right into 1967. In the end the NBBC lost membership due to its poor transparency and the UFAWU cut ties with them until 1953. In the end no new contracts were won between either unions or the co-op in 1952. The UFAWU used this to attempt to obtain cooperation in later years.

==== 1963 ====
A strike year that tested both the union's democratic principles as well as their unity. The 1963 fishing season started off with massive price cuts to all areas of the industry. The most affected were salmon seiners, this caused disunity because the gillnetters did not initially want to lose their season to a strike. Although the Gill-net fishermen didn't want to strike, the strike vote ended unanimous and they worked with their fellow fishermen. In an unusual event the companies did not counter offer in an attempt to stop the strike, they seemed to be wearing under the constant striking of the past 20 years and attempted to put their foot down. The initial problem faced by the UFAWU was deciding when the strike would start officially, they were attempting to make sure the loss was slightly equal so no industry felt it the hardest. Inevitably the seiners still took the brunt of the losses. A few days before the strike many companies in the stikine decided to hire workers for only one or two days in an attempt to disturb the strike vote, this did nothing and only disrupted the workers.

A few days into the strike the majority of companies across the province said they would return sockeye prices to the previous year's standards, however they were not willing to increase any other fish prices. This created a problem because if they wanted to accept this offer they would need 3/4s of the entire unions agreeance. In the middle of fishing season however this is quite difficult, they took a vote with a very low number of members present but immediately regretted it as their membership was concerned with the union forgetting its democratic principles by, by- passing the entire body of membership to get a quick vote. UFAWU President, Homer Stevens quickly mitigated the situation and decided to try to get the entire union together again and take a vote on the matter to restore confidence.

In the end the shoreworkers and tendermen were able to make new master agreements, however after a few weeks they decided to reject these to support their fishermen allies. The fishermen were under immense pressure because the strike caused so much disruption the government decided to start an inquiry into fish prices which could have been disastrous for companies as well as fishermen but later fizzled out in 1964. 1963 is remembered as a union failure and meetings were held by senior administrators to appeal to their lower membership on improvements of the union and restore confidence.

==== 1967 ====
1967 is the most pivotal strike year in UFAWU history in the Prince Rupert area before the 1980s. The strike fundamentally changed the UFAWU and the Prince Rupert Fishermen's Co-op's relationship for the next half a century. The strike is known as a trawling strike, however all fishing trades played a very large part In the strike effort including halibut longliners. Trawling at the time was becoming a very lucrative business because the boats were getting much larger, with much better equipment leading to larger catches to those who could afford the upgrades. The UFAWU recognized that on the west coast there were no trawl share agreements unlike on the east where most agreements were 65% boat owners, 35% crew. At the time in Prince Rupert, many boat owners would hire crew members and give them an improper share but not enough for anyone to start protesting. This began to infuriate senior crew members and they looked to the UFAWU for share agreements.

The majority of trawlers in Prince Rupert that the UFAWU wished to cover were in the Deep Sea Fishermen's union and worked at the Prince Rupert Fishermen's Co-op facility. Prior to 1967 the co-op and the UFAWU had a very rocky relationship. They had many arguments every fishing season and Homer Stevens believed they fundamentally couldn't work together because they believed in two different economic systems, capitalism and socialism. When UFAWU mostly amalgamated in 1943, the co-op used them to cover all of their members, however in 1947 after many years fighting, their fishermen were transferred to the Deep Sea Fishermen's Union. From 1953 onward the co-op officially decided to not respect UFAWU strikes as they had before, they would continue to fish and operate across all picket lines. This was a difficult situation however because although their fishermen were not covered by the UFAWU, many of their shoreworkers were, further complicating things. The relationship between the co-op and the UFAWU prior to 1967 leads you to believe that a large implosion was inevitable.

The negotiations for these share agreements began in 1966 and the UFAWU went along the coast to as many boat owners as they could find at the time and began showing the process and influence of the agreements to both crew members and boat owners. The majority of both sides agreed that this would be beneficial in the long run. They wanted to call a strike, however trawlers do not have a set fishing season and thus they are a hard group to get together, this caused the vote to be very close but it still went through and the strike was poised to start the last week of march.

As the strike started five trawlers decided to go out and fish anyway and came back with their catch expecting it to be offloaded and packed for later sale. UFAWU agreed that it should be offloaded as to not waste the fish, however the union believed that they should wait until after the strike is done to apply proper shares to its crew members. The owners of the vessels did not agree and after a few days of back and forth arguing, the fish went rancid and both the co-op and the vessel owner lost profits. The UFAWU blamed the owners for the loss and vice versa. The strike continued for another two months with strong unity from its membership, however it was tough going when many co-op members were not unionized within the UFAWU.

On May 24 the strike broke as more trawlers began to return to fishing and brought their catches back to the co-op for processing. Shoreworkers who refused to process the fish were bullied into returning to work or simply fired. Homer Stevens, president of the UFAWU recalls instances of many eastern Europeans being threatened with deportation. In an act of the political climate the RCMP kept many union workers away from the plant for the first time within the industry. Although you are not legally entitled to strike on the premises of your employer, it was rare that the RCMP would get involved or the company. However at the time the UFAWU was under constant scrutiny from the public eye because of its communist affiliation.

At the same time that this was going on the UFAWU was also trying to be able to cover Halibut longliners within their union because currently only the Deep Sea Fishermen's Union was able to cover longliners and had recently not covered five families who had lost family members to a sunken halibut boat which Homer Stevens felt was highly unacceptable. This did not bode well with the DSFU as longlining had always been their exclusive territory and UFAWU did not cover the longliners until further into the century. Shoreworkers at the time were striking in support of their fellow fishermen, however they were also concerned with the move from cold to hot fish processing in the co-op plant which they were not trained for, which gave them the incentive to not supply ice during the trawling strike and join the picket line. In the end shoreworkers received no concessions after the strike along with the fishermen.

In the end the UFAWU was decertified at the Co-op, losing its salmon and herring contracts as well as shoreworkers coverage when the strike was called off at the end of July. The Prince Rupert fall out was enormous and caused two of the UFAWU leaders Homer Stevens and Steve Stavenes to go to jail for acting against court orders to force its members back to work. The strike however did give the rest of the province time to sign trawling agreements which in turn bettered the fishing industry. B.C. Packers and CANFISCO both signed trawling agreements which stretched along the coast. All UFAWU members were fired from the co-op but were eventually with lost seniority benefits. Looking forward, the co-op and the UFAWU never saw eye to eye, however when jobs were dipping to all time lows in the 1970s, they worked together on lobbying the province for better industry wide wage increases, job security, and involvement in the labour code.

== Women ==
Women made up the majority of shoreworkers in the union with Aboriginal women making up around eighty percent of that number. Shoreworkers were some of the lowest paid workers with the least desirable jobs and up until 1949 saw very rare pay increases within the UFAWU. In the late 1940s Aboriginal women were finally given the right to monthly pay guarantees as long as their monthly canning minimums were met. This was a positive move forward, however Aboriginal women's housing were the worst of all workers housed at canneries throughout their existence. This was a huge help as into the 1950s women had the most increased level of work and almost no pay increases during the decade. There were two pay increases for female shore workers in 1951 and 1953 versus the pay increases that can be compared to the yearly increases for males and non-shoreworkers.

As canneries started closing down in the 1950s as more and more companies amalgamated their plants into one or two large canneries rather than many small remote canneries which of course hit women the hardest. Because of this development more and more women took on leadership roles within their respective unions. Aboriginal women were more likely to become a part of UFAWU because they believed they had more working issues in common with other shoreworkers than their Aboriginal fishing husbands, fathers and sons. 1954 was a key year for women's and racial rights within the canneries, the NBBC and the UFAWU came together in a meeting and called for new signage on washroom doors. Instead of them reading “White” and “Native” they were replaced with a single sign that read “Women.” This increased female militancy within the union and in the same year Mickey Beagle became the first female elected to office followed by Verna Parkins being elected as the president of the Prince Rupert local in 1956.

== UFAWU and political parties ==
From the time the UFAWU was first established in 1945 to the present, the union was never affiliated with any political party. The first secretary-treasurer, Bill Rigby, and President, George Miller, were members of the Labour Progressive Party (Communist) were not shy about their views, but never imposed them on the union. Many members supported the CCF, and others supported the LPP and other parties. During the Cold War, Right Wing leaders of the CCF, along with the federal Liberal Government and the fishing companies attempted to control or smash the new union. This came to a head in August,1953 when the Trades and Labour Congress suspended the UFAWU for printing an editorial criticizing the leadership for expelling the Vancouver Civic Outside Workers Union (later CUPE 1004). The suspension was followed by a raid by Hal Banks and his Seafarers' International Union in September with the support of the Congress leadership and the fish companies. That raid failed but the Union was under constant threat from the federal government and fish companies. Fishermen were subjected to two attempts by the federal Combines Branch to destroy free collective bargaining in the fishing industry. The UFAWU was always a militant organization, and while some of its leaders were Communist, it was the union's militancy that earned it the hatred and respect of fish companies and governments for being "communist".

== Relationship with The Native Brotherhood of British Columbia ==
The Native Brotherhood of British Columbia (NBBC) was created in 1936 to focus on British Columbian Aboriginal rights including land claims, workers rights and political representation. The NBBC often focused on fishermen because of the potential of winning fishing claims rather than shore workers which was a fundamental divide that saw many of its shoreworkers members join the UFAWU. The two organizations worked together on collective agreements to ensure that aboriginal fishermen were being treated fairly and they won many concessions because of their team work. In the 1950s they fought racial signage as well as won Aboriginal women transportation and seniority rights that all other cannery workers could previously access. Many Aboriginals were members of both unions, this was considered ethical because each union had different goals. This also helped large boat owners because the NBBC accepted large vessels, where the UFAWU did not.

== See also ==
- Fish, Food and Allied Workers Union (Newfoundland and Labrador)

== Sources ==
- Clement, Wallace (1986). The struggle to organize : resistance in Canada's fishery. Toronto: McClelland and Stewart. ISBN 9780771021589. OCLC 14194029.
- Menzies, Charles R. (2001-02-02). "Us and Them: The Prince Rupert Fishermen's Co-op and Organized Labour, 1931-1989". Labour/Le Travail. 48. eISSN 1911-4842.
- Muszunski, Alicja (1996). Cheap Wage Labour: Race and Gender in the Fisheries of British Columbia. Montreal and Kingston: McGill-Queen's University Press. ISBN 978-0-7735-6582-1.
- Stevens, Homer; Knight, Rolf (1992). Homer Stevens: A Life in Fishing. Madeira Park, BC: Harbour Publishing. ISBN 9781550170702.
