= Focus on the Family Canada =

Evangelical Christian organization

Focus on the Family (Canada) Association
- Type: NGO
- VAT ID no.: 106845969 RR0001
- Legal status: Charitable organization
- Purpose: advocate and public voice, educator and network
- Headquarters: Langley, British Columbia
- Official language: English; French
- President: Jean-Paul Beran
- Affiliations: Focus on the Family.
- Website: focusonthefamily.ca

Focus on the Family Canada (French: Focus Famille), legally incorporated as the Focus on the Family (Canada) Association, is a Canadian affiliate of the American evangelical Christian organization Focus on the Family. It was founded in 1983, and is based in Langley, British Columbia.

== History ==
Six years after Focus on the Family began in the U.S., Focus on the Family Canada opened in a one-room office in Vancouver, BC, eventually growing as an independent partner in one of the largest family ministries in the world.

== Controversy ==
Focus on the Family Canada has established the Institute of Marriage and Family Canada/Institut du Mariage et de la Famille Canada (IMFC) which has intervened in family law court cases. In H v. M (1999) the organization unsuccessfully supported denying same-sex couples the right to apply for alimony from one another. In 2004 it was successful in the precedent setting case of Canadian Foundation for Children, Youth and the Law v. Canada (Attorney General), in which the Supreme Court of Canada upheld the legality of child spanking in Canada.

== Organization ==
Current president is Jean-Paul Beran (2021–present). Former presidents of the organization include: Geoff Still (1986–1995), Bruce Gordon (1995–1998), one time Deputy Chief of Staff to PM Harper, Darrel Reid (1998–2004), Terence Rolston (2004–2021).

A former member of the board of directors of Focus on the Family Canada is Sharon Hayes, who from 1993 to 1997 was a Member of Parliament belonging to the Reform Party of Canada.
