= Joe Peschisolido =

Canadian politician (born 1963)

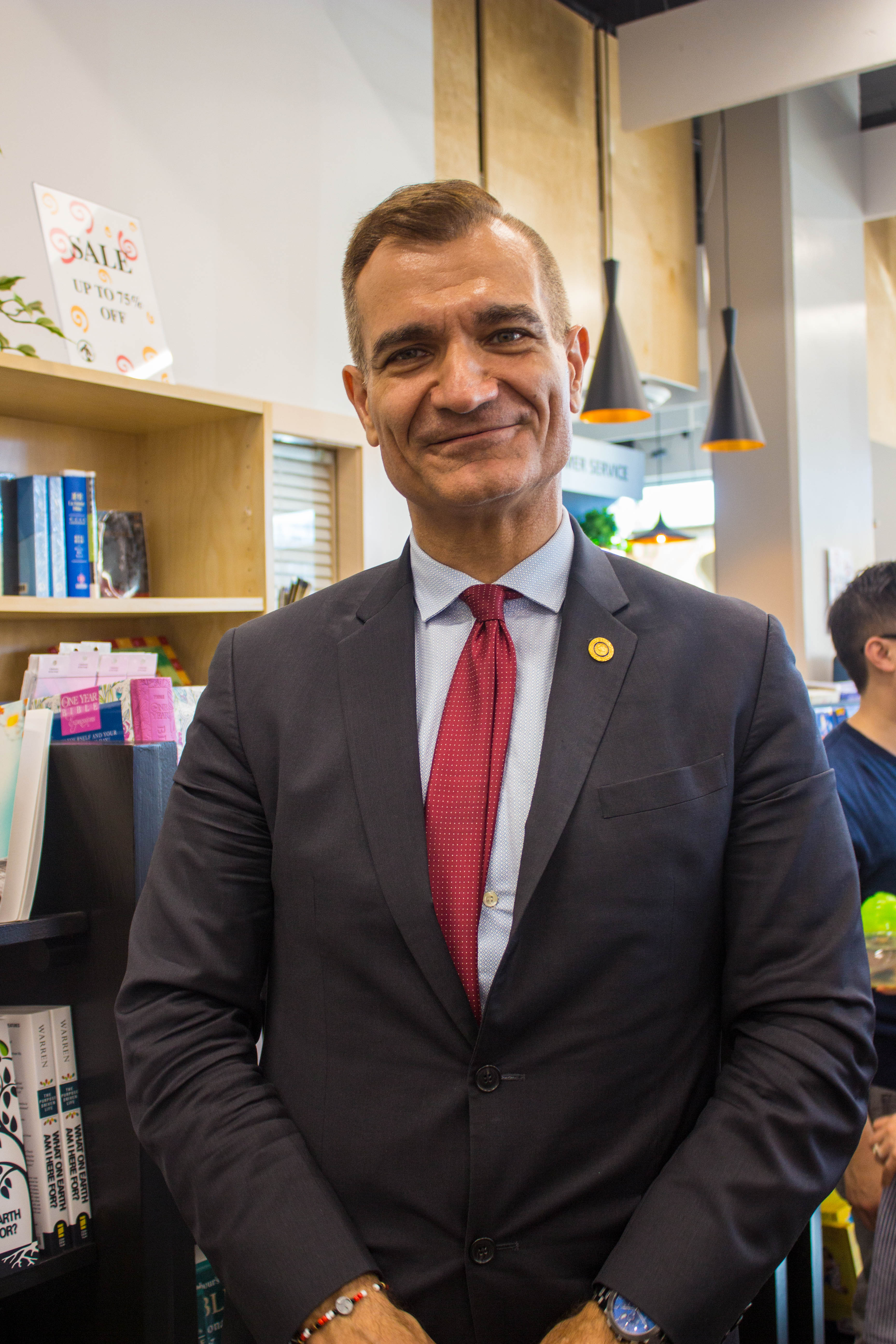

Member of Parliament for Steveston—Richmond East
- In office October 19, 2015 – September 11, 2019
- Preceded by: new district
- Succeeded by: Kenny Chiu

Member of Parliament for Richmond
- In office November 27, 2000 – June 28, 2004
- Preceded by: Raymond Chan
- Succeeded by: Raymond Chan

Personal details
- Born: April 27, 1963 (age 63) Toronto, Ontario, Canada
- Party: Liberal (until 1993; 2002–present)
- Other political affiliations: Reform (1993-2000); Canadian Alliance (2000-2002)
- Spouse: Monica Landolt (divorced)
- Profession: Lawyer

Joe Peschisolido (born April 27, 1963) is a Canadian lawyer and politician who served as the Member of Parliament (MP) for the riding of Richmond from 2000 to 2004 and as the MP for Steveston—Richmond East from 2015 to 2019. He was first elected as a member of the Canadian Alliance, but crossed the floor to the Liberal Party in 2002.

== Background ==
Born in Toronto, Peschisolido has a Bachelor of Arts (honours) degree in political science from Trinity College at the University of Toronto and a law degree from Osgoode Hall Law School. Peschisolido is a fourth degree knight of the Knights of Columbus in Richmond, a member of the Rotary Club of Richmond Sunset and a member of the Richmond Chamber of Commerce. He is a parishioner of Canadian Martyrs Catholic Church and a vegan.

== Political career ==
Peschisolido had been a longtime member of the Liberal Party of Canada, and worked as a youth co-ordinator for Jean Chrétien's 1990 leadership campaign. He switched to the Reform Party of Canada in 1993, and ran as their candidate in Etobicoke North in that year's federal election and a subsequent 1996 by-election, placing second both times. He contested the 1997 federal election again as a Reform candidate, this time placing third in Mississauga South. The Reform Party became the Canadian Alliance in 2000, and he participated in the leadership race before dropping out.

=== First term (2000 to 2004) ===
Peschisolido relocated to British Columbia, and ran in the 2000 general election as a Canadian Alliance candidate, defeating Liberal incumbent Raymond Chan to become the Member of Parliament for Richmond. He served variously as the Alliance's critic on national revenue and human resources development, and was vice-chair for the Standing Committee on Human Resources Development and the Status of Persons with Disabilities.

Disappointment over the Alliance's performance in the election led to caucus infighting, and ultimately another leadership election. Dissatisfied with the party's state of affairs and how it handled Roy Bailey's remarks over the appointment of Liberal MP Rey Pagtakhan as Minister of Veterans Affairs, Peschisolido left the Alliance in January 2002 and rejoined the Liberal Party. He was named by Chrétien as Parliamentary Secretary to the President of the Queen's Privy Council for Canada and Minister of Intergovernmental Affairs in January 2003, serving until Paul Martin became prime minister that December.

While in office, Peschisolido fought to protect the rights of taxpayers by introducing the "Taxpayers' Bill of Rights" in the 37th Parliament's first, second, and third sessions. He also helped broker the original Garden City land deal in 2002, which involved the transfer of said lands from the Canadian federal government to the City of Richmond. This deal would have seen the City of Richmond receive 75 to 80 percent of the land, with the rest of the property set aside for a trade and exhibition centre, as well as commercial development; the deal was halted due to a court injunction filed by the Musqueam First Nation.

Peschisolido lost the Liberal nomination in 2004 to his predecessor as Member of Parliament, Raymond Chan, who went on to retain the riding for the Liberals in that year's federal election.

=== 2011 election ===
In 2009, Peschisolido won the Liberal nomination over Raymond Chan for Member of Parliament for Richmond. In the 2011 federal election, Peschisolido was defeated by Alice Wong by more than 17,000 votes.

=== Second term (2015 to 2019) ===
On August 11, 2015, Peschisolido again won the Liberal nomination for Member of Parliament in the new riding of Steveston—Richmond East for the 2015 Canadian federal election. On October 19, 2015, as a Liberal majority government was formed, Peschisolido returned to Parliament by defeating Conservative candidate Kenny Chiu.

In July 2019, Global News reported the Royal Canadian Mounted Police opened an investigation into Peschisolido "after confidential police informants alleged the veteran politician had been knowingly associating with Chinese organized crime figures through his former real estate law practice in Richmond, B.C." Peschisolido's law firm allegedly received money via illicit channels from China as part of an attempt by the firm's clients to circumvent the legal immigration process. No charges have been laid against Peschisolido or lawyers at his firm. Peschisolido turned in his law license in 2018.

Peschisolido faced Kenny Chiu again in the 2019 federal election, this time losing to Chiu. On February 5, 2020, the Ethics Commissioner of Canada released an investigative report on Peschisolido, finding that he contravened subsections 21(3) and 20(1) of the Conflict of Interest Code for Members of the House of Commons for failing to file a statement of material change and by failing to file a full statement of the private interests. Parliament could not apply sanctions since Peschisolido was no longer a sitting MP.

== Electoral record ==
2019 Canadian federal election: Steveston—Richmond East
Party	Candidate	Votes	%	±%	Expenditures
Conservative	Kenny Chiu	17,478	41.66	+3.19	$98,359.86
Liberal	Joe Peschisolido	14,731	35.11	–9.97	$103,301.31
New Democratic	Jaeden Dela Torre	6,321	15.07	+2.93	$2,143.97
Green	Nicole Iaci	2,972	7.08	+3.41	$2,240.36
Independent	Ping Chan	449	1.07	–	none listed
Total valid votes/expense limit		41,951	98.98	–	$105,107.07
Total rejected ballots		431	1.02	+0.36	
Turnout		42,382	56.94	–3.30	
Eligible voters		74,428			
Conservative gain from Liberal		Swing		+6.58	
Source: Elections Canada

2015 Canadian federal election: Steveston—Richmond East
Party	Candidate	Votes	%	±%	Expenditures
Liberal	Joe Peschisolido	19,486	45.08	+26.48	$76,684.16
Conservative	Kenny Chiu	16,630	38.47	–15.44	$150,116.66
New Democratic	Scott Stewart	5,248	12.14	–10.68	$13,705.27
Green	Laura-Leah Shaw	1,587	3.67	–0.46	$1,891.69
Libertarian	Matthew Swanston	274	0.63	–	none listed
Total valid votes/expense limit		43,225	99.34	–	$204,726.35
Total rejected ballots		287	0.66	–	
Turnout		43,512	60.25	–	
Eligible voters		72,225			
Liberal notional gain from Conservative		Swing		+20.96	
Source: Elections Canada

2011 Canadian federal election: Richmond
Party	Candidate	Votes	%	±%	Expenditures
Conservative	Alice Wong	25,109	58.36	+8.54	$88,747.89
Liberal	Joe Peschisolido	8,027	18.66	–12.18	$56,664.57
New Democratic	Dale Jackaman	7,860	18.27	+6.47	$8,890.83
Green	Michael Anthony Wolfe	2,032	4.72	–1.70	$2,933.09
Total valid votes/expense limit		43,028	99.49	–	$91,788.54
Total rejected ballots		220	0.51	+0.06	
Turnout		43,248	50.50	–1.49	
Eligible voters		85,643			
Conservative hold		Swing		+10.36	
Source: Elections Canada

2000 Canadian federal election: Richmond
Party	Candidate	Votes	%	±%	Expenditures
Alliance	Joe Peschisolido	21,064	44.41	+8.44	$58,128
Liberal	Raymond Chan	19,940	42.04	–1.77	$63,896
New Democratic	Gail Paquette	2,695	5.68	–3.88	$10,941
Progressive Conservative	Frank Peter Tofin	2,578	5.44	–2.85	$4,329
Green	Kevan Hudson	897	1.89	+0.53	$61
Natural Law	Kathy McClement	164	0.35	–0.05	none listed
Marxist–Leninist	Edith Petersen	93	0.20	–0.02	$10
Total valid votes		47,431	99.54		
Total rejected ballots		218	0.46	–0.05	
Turnout		47,649	61.70	–3.19	
Eligible voters		77,226			
Alliance gain from Liberal		Swing		+5.10	
Source: Elections Canada

1997 Canadian federal election: Mississauga South
Party	Candidate	Votes	%	±%
Liberal	Paul Szabo	21,207	49.9	+3.4
Progressive Conservative	Dick Barr	10,077	23.7	+0.4
Reform	Joe Peschisolido	8,307	19.6	-5.6
New Democratic	Jessica Lott	2,302	5.4	+3.3
Natural Law	Scott Kay	199	0.5	0.0
Canadian Action	Aaron Gervais	150	0.4	
Independent	Adrian Earl Crewson	141	0.3	
Marxist–Leninist	Dagmar Sullivan	79	0.2	+0.1
Total valid votes		42,462	100.0	

By-election on March 25, 1996 Etobicoke North
Party	Candidate	Votes	%	±%
Liberal	Roy Cullen	12,290	46.3	-9.3
Reform	Joe Peschisolido	9,563	36.0	+17.2
Progressive Conservative	Mario Annecchini	2,812	10.6	-8.2
New Democratic	Maxine Caron	1,400	5.3	+1.6
Christian Heritage	Ron Gray	284	1.1	
Abolitionist	John Turmel	104	0.4	
Independent	Sylvie Charbin	96	0.4	
Total valid votes		26,549	100.0	

1993 Canadian federal election: Etobicoke North
Party	Candidate	Votes	%	±%
Liberal	Roy MacLaren	28,015	55.6	+10.3
Reform	Joe Peschisolido	9,470	18.8	
Progressive Conservative	Jane MacLaren	9,470	18.8	-15.8
New Democratic	Carmela Sasso	1,839	3.7	-13.7
National	Emanuele Danelon	661	1.3	
Libertarian	Daniel Hunt	363	0.7	-0.2
Natural Law	Marilyn Pepper	353	0.7	
Independent	Antonio De Felice	105	0.2	
Marxist–Leninist	David Greig	104	0.2	+0.1
Total valid votes		50,380	100.0	
