= Parm Bains =

Canadian politician

Parm Bains MP
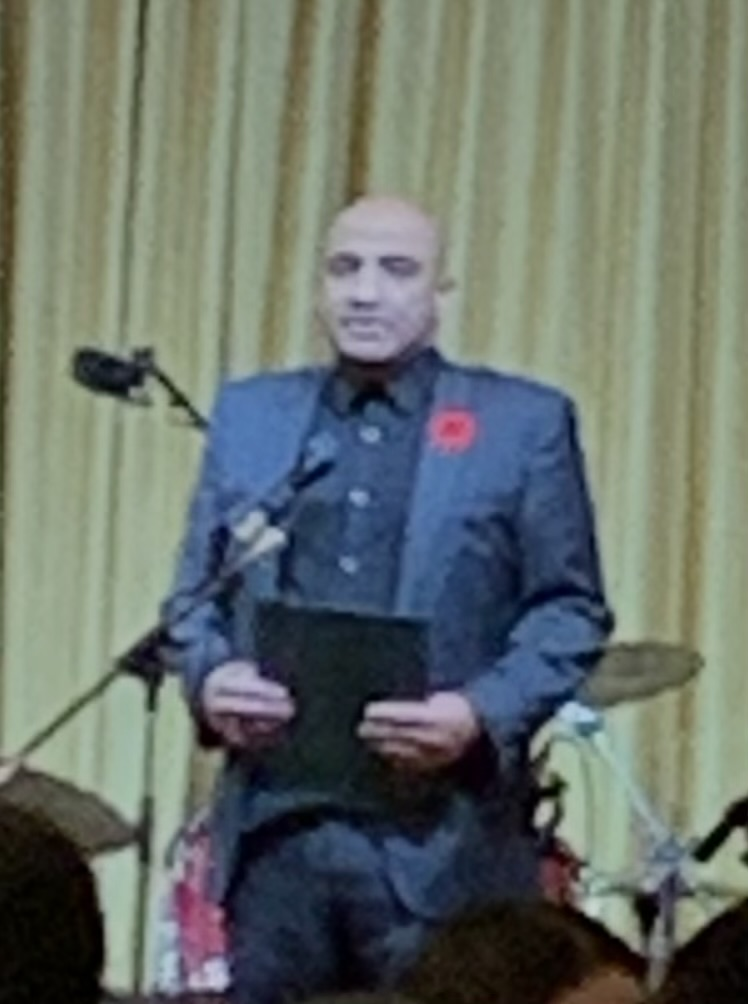
- Bains in 2025

Member of Parliament for Richmond East—Steveston Steveston—Richmond East (2021-2025)
- Incumbent
- Assumed office September 20, 2021
- Preceded by: Kenny Chiu

Personal details
- Born: Victoria, British Columbia
- Party: Liberal
- Other political affiliations: Richmond Community Coalition
- Education: British Columbia Institute of Technology; Royal Roads University (Master of Arts)

Paramvir "Parm" Bains is a Canadian politician who has represented Richmond East—Steveston (formerly Steveston—Richmond East) in the House of Commons since 2021, as a member of the Liberal Party.

== Early life and career ==
Born in Victoria, British Columbia, Bains moved with his family to Richmond at the age of one. He is from a Sikh family and his parents immigrated to Canada from Mahilpur, Punjab, India. He attended the British Columbia Institute of Technology, and later received a master of arts degree in professional communications from Royal Roads University. He worked for the Government of British Columbia as a public and media relations officer, then as a lecturer at Kwantlen Polytechnic University's School of Business.

Bains is married and has two children.

== Politics ==
Bains ran for Richmond City Council in the 2018 British Columbia municipal elections as a Richmond Community Coalition candidate, but was not elected.

He ran as a Liberal Party candidate in the 2021 federal election, and defeated Conservative incumbent Kenny Chiu in the riding of Steveston—Richmond East. In the 44th Parliament, he served as member in the standing committees on Government Operations and Estimates, and Access to Information, Privacy and Ethics.

Bains endorsed Mark Carney in the 2025 Liberal Party of Canada leadership election. He was re-elected in the renamed riding of Richmond East—Steveston in that year's federal election, receiving 48.5% of the vote, and became member of the standing committee on Industry and Technology in the 45th Parliament.

=== Chinese interference allegations ===
In 2023, allegations surfaced that the Chinese government may have attempted to influence Parm Bains' 2021 election victory in Steveston—Richmond East. Reports indicated disinformation campaigns on Chinese-language platforms, such as WeChat and WhatsApp, targeted his opponent Kenny Chiu, a critic of the Chinese Communist Party (CCP) and sponsor of a foreign influence registry bill.

Canadian Security Intelligence Service (CSIS) documents flagged the riding as a potential target of interference. Bains denied that foreign interference played a role in his victory and insisted he won "fair and square."

== Electoral history ==
=== Federal elections ===
2025 Canadian federal election: Richmond East—Steveston
Party	Candidate	Votes	%	±%	Expenditures
Liberal	Parm Bains	25,705	48.45	+6.54	$124,436.54
Conservative	Zach Segal	24,605	46.38	+12.39	$128,765.42
New Democratic	Keefer Pelech	2,251	4.24	–15.14	$4,484.39
Green	Steven Ji	494	0.93	–1.41	$590.25
Total valid votes/expense limit		53,055	99.32	–	$129,548.56
Total rejected ballots		361	0.68	–0.24	
Turnout		53,416	63.58	+10.91	
Eligible voters		84,011			
Liberal **notional hold**		Swing		–2.93	
Source: Elections Canada

2021 Canadian federal election: Steveston—Richmond East
Party	Candidate	Votes	%	±%	Expenditures
Liberal	Parm Bains	16,543	42.47	+7.36	$101,930.66
Conservative	Kenny Chiu	13,066	33.55	–8.12	$88,909.23
New Democratic	Jack Trovato	7,525	19.32	+4.25	$9,430.58
People's	Jennifer Singh	955	2.45	–	$2,482.99
Green	Françoise Raunet	860	2.21	–4.88	none listed
Total valid votes/expense limit		38,949	99.08	–	$108,448.59
Total rejected ballots		363	0.92	–0.09	
Turnout		39,312	52.67	–4.28	
Eligible voters		74,641			
Liberal **gain** from Conservative		Swing		+7.74	
Source: Elections Canada

=== Municipal elections ===
Top 8 candidates elected — Incumbents marked with "(X)". Elected members' names are in bold

2018 British Columbia municipal elections: Richmond City Council
Party	Council candidate	Vote	%
RITE Richmond	**Carol Day** (X)	20,871	7.01
Richmond Citizens' Association	**Harold Steves** (X)	19,136	6.43
Richmond Community Coalition	**Chak Au** (X)	18,026	6.05
Richmond First	**Bill McNulty** (X)	17,242	5.79
Richmond Citizens' Association	**Kelly Greene**	16,464	5.53
Richmond First	**Linda McPhail** (X)	15,521	5.21
RITE Richmond	**Michael Wolfe**	13,627	4.58
Independent	**Alexa Loo** (X)	13,212	4.44
Richmond First	Derek Dang (X)	13,115	4.40
Richmond First	Andy Hobbs	12,336	4.14
Richmond Citizens' Association	Judie Schneider	11,672	3.92
Richmond Community Coalition	Ken Johnston (X)	11,161	3.75
Richmond Community Coalition	Jonathan Ho	11,140	3.74
Richmond Citizens' Association	Jack Trovato	10,915	3.67
Richmond First	Sunny Ho	8,933	3.00
RITE Richmond	Niti Sharma	8,917	2.99
RITE Richmond	Henry Yao	8,467	2.84
Richmond First	Peter Liu	8,357	2.81
Richmond Community Coalition	Parm Bains	7,973	2.68
Independent	John Roston	7,961	2.67
Richmond Community Coalition	Melissa Zhang	7,708	2.38
Independent	Kerry Starchuk	6,959	2.34
Independent	Jason Tarnow	5,720	1.92
Independent	Adil Awan	4,278	1.44
Independent	Manjit Singh	4,134	1.39
Independent	Dennis Page	3,478	1.17
Independent	Andy Chiang	3,337	1.12
Independent	Theresa Head	3,251	1.09
Independent	Patrick J. Saunders	2,241	0.75
Independent	Zhe Zhang	2,241	0.75
