= Homer Stevens =

Canadian trade unionist and fisherman

Homer John Stevens (August 2, 1923 – 2002) was a Canadian trade unionist and fisherman from British Columbia. He was the general secretary and then president of the United Fishermen and Allied Workers' Union (UFAWU). UFAWU represented fishermen, shoreworkers, and workers in fish processing and transport. In 1967, he was sentenced to a year in prison for contempt of court when he defied a court order. In 2017, the Vancouver Sun profiled Stevens as one of their "150 noteworthy British Columbians". In 2020, the Communist Party of Canada held a celebration in his honour at a public park in Delta, British Columbia.

== Elections ==
A lifelong Communist, he was a candidate for political office eight times between 1953 and 1988, losing each contest.

- In the 1953 Canadian federal election, he was the Labor-Progressive Party's nominee in the Burnaby—Richmond federal riding, receiving 792 votes.
- In the 1960 British Columbia general election, he was nominee of the Communist Party of Canada in the Delta riding for the Legislative Assembly of British Columbia.
- In the 1966 British Columbia general election, he was nominee of the Communist Party of Canada in the Vancouver East riding for the Legislative Assembly of British Columbia.
- In the 1972 British Columbia general election, he was nominee of the Communist Party of Canada in the Vancouver-Little Mountain riding for the Legislative Assembly of British Columbia.
- In the 1974 Canadian federal election, he was the Communist Party of Canada's nominee in the Burnaby—Richmond—Delta federal riding, receiving 299 votes.
- In the 1979 Canadian federal election, he was the Communist Party of Canada's nominee in the Richmond—South Delta federal riding, receiving 164 votes.
- In the 1980 Canadian federal election, he was the Communist Party of Canada's nominee in the Richmond—South Delta federal riding, receiving 170 votes.
- In the 1988 Canadian federal election, he was the Communist Party of Canada's nominee in the Richmond—South Delta federal riding, receiving 113 votes.

== Bibliography ==
- Homer Stevens: A Life in Fishing by Homer Stevens, Rolf Knight and Harbour Publishing, 1992.
