= Nick Loenen =

Canadian politician

MLA for Richmond
- In office 1986–1991

Personal details
- Born: 1942 or 1943 (age 82–83)
- Party: Social Credit Party of British Columbia

Nick Loenen (born 1942 or 1943) is a former Canadian politician. Loenen was born in the Netherlands and immigrated to Canada with his family in 1956. He served in the Legislative Assembly of British Columbia from 1986 to 1991, as a Social Credit member for the constituency of Richmond. He was defeated when he sought reelection in 1991 in the new constituency of Richmond-Steveston. He was also defeated when he ran for the Reform Party in the Richmond federal constituency in the 1993 federal election.

In 1997, Loenen published a book titled Citizenship and Democracy: A Case for Proportional Representation where he argues that Canada's first-past-the-post voting system is inefficient and that proportional representation is the solution.
