= Darrel Reid =

Canadian policy advisor and political candidate (born 1957)

Darrel R. Reid (born June 3, 1957 in Grande Prairie, Alberta) is a Canadian policy advisor, political manager and federal candidate in two Canadian federal political elections. He is particularly notable as having occupied positions as the Chief of Staff or Deputy Chief of Staff of two Canadian federal political leaders, Preston Manning and Stephen Harper.

== History ==
=== Education ===
Reid obtained a Bachelor of Arts degree from the University of Regina in 1981. This was followed by a Master of Arts degree in 1984 and a Master of Library Sciences degree in 1985, both from the University of Toronto. In 1994, he completed a doctorate in history at the Queen's University. The topic of his dissertation was the life of Albert Benjamin Simpson.

=== Queen's University ===
Between 1988 and 1994, during the course of his doctoral studies, Reid served as Information Officer and Manager, Publishing and Information Systems, of the Institute of Intergovernmental Relations, School of Policy Studies, Queen's University.

=== The Reform Party of Canada ===
Following the completion of his doctorate, Reid served as Director of Policy and Research for the Reform Party of Canada. In May 1996 he became Chief of Staff to Preston Manning, Leader of Canada’s Official Opposition. In 1997, he ran unsuccessfully as a Reform Party candidate for the riding of Lanark-Carleton.

=== Focus on the Family Canada ===
From 1998 to 2004, Reid was the president of the evangelical Christian organization Focus on the Family Canada. He promoted conservative Christian family values, while actively campaigning against issues such as divorce, abortion and same-sex marriage.

=== As a Corporate Executive ===
In 2004, Reid left Focus on the Family Canada to become Vice-President of Current Corporation, a high-tech firm specializing in night vision systems for the marine industry.

In May 2005, Reid won the Conservative nomination for Richmond and ran unsuccessfully in the subsequent federal election. Following his January, 2006 election loss, Reid became Vice President of Project Development for the Work Research Foundation, an organization with the stated mission to "influence people to a Christian view of work and public life."

=== Minister Rona Ambrose ===
In September, 2006, Reid announced that he had accepted an offer to become the Chief of Staff for Environment Minister Rona Ambrose. This was an appointment requiring the approval of the Office of the Prime Minister, in accordance with the practice established by the Prime Minister's office, following the Conservative Party minority election win earlier that year. Reid thereafter withdrew his candidacy for nomination to run again as the Conservative candidate in Richmond.

=== Office of the Prime Minister of Canada ===
In April 2007, Reid was appointed Deputy Director of Policy and Research to Prime Minister Stephen Harper. On July 7, 2008, one week after Guy Giorno assumed the position as the Prime Minister's new Chief of Staff, Reid was appointed Director of Policy in the Prime Minister's office, replacing Director of Policy and Research Mark Cameron. Reid's first parliamentary position, commencing in 1994 and as noted earlier herein, had been as Director of Policy and Research for the Reform Party of Canada. Reid later was promoted to the position of Deputy Chief of Staff. In August 2009, Reid assumed additional responsibilities to those of Deputy Chief of Staff, becoming also the Prime Minister's Director of Regional Affairs.

=== The Manning Centre ===
In August 2010, Reid became the Executive Director of The Manning Centre, a policy and research forum founded by Preston Manning.
