= Gurmant Grewal =

Canadian politician

Member of Parliament for Newton—North Delta (Surrey Central; 1997–2004)
- In office 2 June 1997 – 23 January 2006
- Preceded by: Riding established
- Succeeded by: Sukh Dhaliwal

Personal details
- Born: Gurmant Singh Grewal; 21 December 1957 (age 68) Barundi, Punjab, India
- Party: People's (since 2018)
- Other political affiliations: Conservative (until 2018)
- Spouse: Nina Grewal

Gurmant Singh Grewal (born 21 December 1957) is an Indo-Canadian politician and former Conservative Member of Parliament. Gurmant and his wife, Nina Grewal, who represented Fleetwood—Port Kells from 2004 to 2015, were the first married couple to serve in the House of Commons of Canada at the same time. First elected to the Canadian House of Commons on 2 June 1997 for the riding of Surrey Central and re-elected there on 27 November 2000, he represented the riding of Newton—North Delta from 2004 until 2005. Grewal announced that he would not be running in the 2006 federal election over a dispute of alleged offer of patronage with the Liberal Party, which was governing at that time.

As a Member of Parliament sitting in the caucus of the Reform Party from 1997 to 2000, the Canadian Alliance from 2000 to 2003 and then for the Conservative Party of Canada from 2003 to 2006, Grewal held the positions of Deputy House Leader of the Official Opposition of Canada (1998–2000), Co-Chair of the Joint Standing Committee of the House and the Senate for Scrutiny of Regulations (1998–2005), Official Opposition Critic for Multiculturalism (2004), Official Opposition Critic for Scrutiny of Regulations (2001–2004), Official Opposition Critic for Canadians Abroad (2004), Official Opposition Critic for Asia Pacific (2001–2004) and Official Opposition Senior Critic for Foreign Affairs (1997–2004)

== Early life and career ==
Grewal was born to a Jat Sikh family on 21 December 1957 in Barundi, Punjab, India. At the age of eight, Grewal and his brother were invited to the Vice President's Gallery United States Senate Chamber by Hubert Humphrey the Vice President of the United States. After earning BSc (Honours) and MBA degrees and working as a manager with a reputed organisation in India, he emigrated to Liberia, prior to immigrating to Canada in 1991. In Liberia he was a manager, successful businessman and Assistant Professor of Business Management at the University of Liberia.

Grewal wanted to help the suffering people and victims of the bloody civil war with medicine, food and clothes and intended to organise a charity to help in consultation with the office of the ambassador of Liberia. The Grewal brothers had earlier written a letter advising the President of Liberia to launch a Green Revolution to grow more food that would help eliminate hunger, malnutrition and poverty. This advice generated some commotion, particularly by a reporter with the Province newspaper in 1995. The article construed that Grewal was an advisor to the military dictator, despite the Liberian ambassador having issued a letter clarifying the issue. Grewal has denied any such connections to the former government of Liberia. Grewal appealed to the international community to help Liberia and its people.

== Federal politics ==
In 1991, he emigrated to Canada. Within less than six years, he was elected as an MP for the Reform Party of Canada in the federal riding of Surrey Central, in the 1997 federal election with 17,438 votes. In the 2000 federal election he won by getting 29,812 votes, 51.6% of the popular vote – a margin of 10,300 votes more than the Liberal candidate. However, in the 2004 federal election his margin of victory fell to 500 votes.

As a Member of Parliament sitting in the caucus of the Reform Party from 1997 to 2000, the Canadian Alliance from 2000 to 2003 and then for the Conservative Party of Canada from 2003 to 2006, Grewal held the positions of Deputy House Leader of the Official Opposition of Canada (1998–2000), Co-Chair of the Joint Standing Committee of the House and the Senate for Scrutiny of Regulations (1998–2005), Official Opposition Critic for Multiculturalism (2004), Official Opposition Critic for Scrutiny of Regulations (2001–2004), Official Opposition Critic for Canadians Abroad (2004), Official Opposition Critic for Asia Pacific (2001–2004) and Official Opposition Senior Critic for Foreign Affairs (1997–2004).

As a result of his wife, Nina Grewal, winning a seat in the 2004 federal election, the Grewals became the first married couple to serve concurrently in the Canadian House of Commons.

=== Immigration Bond Bill (C-284) ===
Grewal had introduced a Bill C-284 to allow a bond to be posted to secure a visitor's visa, his bill passed the vote in the House and was referred to the Immigration Committee in March 2005. On 6 April 2005, the Minister of Citizenship and Immigration, Joe Volpe, asked the parliamentary Ethics Commissioner and Royal Canadian Mounted Police (RCMP) to investigate Grewal following his voluntary statement given to a parliamentary committee. In that testimony, Grewal had stated that he regularly asked those seeking his help in getting visitor visas for their relatives, if they would be willing to post bonds guaranteeing their return. Grewal contends that immigration bonds, as they have been practiced in Australia and New Zealand, could work as a way to prevent spurious refugee claims and illegal immigration; and assist law-abiding sponsors to secure visa for their loved ones to visit Canada without hassle. There is no evidence that any bond was actually signed (or any money exchanged for the bonds). On 22 June, the ethics commissioner cleared him of any wrongdoing and stated that he never pocketed any money from the pledges.

=== The "Grewal tapes" ===
In mid-May 2005, at the time the Liberal government risked losing a confidence vote on its budget (which was later decided in the government's favour by the speaker, after a tie in the house), the Liberals initiated negotiations with Grewal asking him to vote with the Liberals and join the Liberal Party of Canada. With a Liberal go-between, Ujjal Dosanjh, Minister of Health, and Tim Murphy, the Chief of Staff of the Prime Minister met with Grewal, on three occasions 16–18 May, including Grewal's office. There were also 36 phone calls by the Liberals.

In these negotiations Grewal asked for a senate seat for his wife, a cabinet post for himself, and an apology from Volpe. In response, Murphy and Dosanjh made vague promises of future rewards. While these negotiations were going on, prominent Conservative MP Belinda Stronach defected to the Liberals and did receive a ministerial position in the government. In the end, Grewal did not change parties.

Unbeknownst to his interlocutors, Grewal was recording the conversations, a fact that he voluntarily revealed to the public on the evening of 18 May, where Grewal publicly accused the Liberals of trying to buy his vote with offers of a cabinet or a diplomatic post for himself and a senate seat for his wife. He had released excerpts of nine minutes of a recording of conversations with Murphy and Dosanjh, in which Murphy suggests that he abstain from the coming confidence vote. New Democratic Party MP Yvon Godin referred them to Bernard Shapiro, Parliamentary Ethics Commissioner and to the RCMP.

On 31 May, Grewal handed over recordings to Shapiro and the RCMP. Simultaneously he released an hour and 15 minutes of recordings and transcripts to the public.

Several news outlets and the Liberals alleged that portions of the tape seemed to be edited, something that the Conservatives denied. On 2 June 2005, the Conservatives issued a news release admitting that two short sections had been accidentally omitted. In mid-August, the RCMP announced that there would be no further criminal investigation into the tapes and their contents and Grewal was cleared of any wrongdoing.

On 25 January 2006, Shapiro released a heavily edited report from the draft reports and stated, "While it is not clear whether Mr. Grewal genuinely sought an inducement to change his vote or whether he just acted the part in an attempt to entrap Mr. Dosanjh, his actions were, in either case, extremely inappropriate". The report also said that Grewal's behaviour violated the spirit of the MPs’ Code of Conduct.

The Liberals claimed that it was Grewal who approached them seeking patronage appointments for himself and his wife in exchange for their votes.

Grewal did not run for re-election in 2006, saying he did not want the controversies surrounding his behaviour to be a distraction during the campaign.

=== Attempted political comeback ===
Grewal had planned to stand for the Conservatives in the new riding of Cloverdale—Langley City in the 2015 federal election, spending two years to sign up 1,500 party members in his pursuit of the nomination, but in November 2014 he was barred by the party from seeking the nomination. His son, Liv Grewal, was to run for the Conservatives in Mission—Matsqui—Fraser Canyon after defeating four other candidates to win the nomination but was subsequently forced by the party to withdraw. In 2018, Grewal announced his support for ex-Conservative MP Maxime Bernier's new party, the People's Party of Canada.

== Awards and accolades ==
In 2002, he was awarded the Queen's Golden Jubilee Medal for service to Canada. In 2003, then the Leader of the Opposition Stephen Harper Prime Minister of Canada called Grewal "the Ironman of Canadian Parliament". In 2012, Grewal was awarded Doctor of Philosophy in Political Science and Diplomacy Honoris Causa degree by the Caucasus University in Georgia. Grewal was awarded the 'World Sikh Award' in 2012 at London, U.K. and he was listed 27th most influential Sikh in the world.

== Electoral results ==
2004 Canadian federal election: Newton—North Delta
| Party | Candidate | Votes | % | ±% | Expenditures |
|---|---|---|---|---|---|
| Conservative | Gurmant Grewal | 13,529 | 32.82 | – | $72,183.08 |
| Liberal | Sukh Dhaliwal | 13,009 | 31.55 | – | $64,235.28 |
| New Democratic | Nancy Clegg | 12,037 | 29.20 | – | $24,563.59 |
| Green | John Hague | 2,555 | 6.20 | – | $2,736.63 |
| Communist | Nazir Rizvi | 98 | 0.24 | – | $389.84 |
| Total valid votes/expense limit | | 41,228 | 99.48 | – | $72,282.76 |
| Total rejected ballots | | 216 | 0.52 | – | |
| Turnout | | 41,444 | 62.99 | – | |
| Eligible voters | | 65,794 | | | |
Source: Elections Canada

2000 Canadian federal election: Surrey Central
| Party | Candidate | Votes | % | ±% | Expenditures |
|---|---|---|---|---|---|
| Alliance | Gurmant Grewal | 29,812 | 51.6% | +17.8% | |
| Liberal | Peter Warkentin | 19,513 | 33.8% | | |
| Progressive Conservative | Dan Baxter | 3,940 | 6.8% | | |
| New Democratic | Dan Goy | 3,211 | 5.6% | | |
| Green | David Walters | 1,175 | 2.0% | | |
| Communist | Harjit Daudharia | 114 | 0.2% | | |
| Total valid votes | | 57,765 | 99.7% | | |
| Total rejected ballots | | 196 | 0.3% | | |
| Turnout | | 57,961 | 59.5% | | |

Note: Canadian Alliance vote is compared to Reform vote in 1997.

1997 Canadian federal election: Surrey Central
| Party | Candidate | Votes | % | ±% | Expenditures |
|---|---|---|---|---|---|
| Reform | Gurmant Grewal | 17,461 | 34.67 | –6.73 | $32,008 |
| Liberal | Palbinder Kaur Shergill | 14,595 | 28.98 | –0.44 | $65,570 |
| New Democratic | Charan Gill | 7,064 | 14.03 | +4.03 | $58,025 |
| Independent | Mike Runte | 4,596 | 9.13 | – | $25,401 |
| Progressive Conservative | Vincent Allan Antonio | 4,327 | 8.59 | –4.95 | $24,601 |
| Christian Heritage | Bill Stilwell | 978 | 1.94 | – | $2,944 |
| Canadian Action | Philip McCormack | 634 | 1.26 | – | $3,497 |
| Green | Imtiaz Popat | 417 | 0.83 | – | none listed |
| Natural Law | Val Litwin | 147 | 0.29 | – | none listed |
| Independent | Gaetan Myre | 140 | 0.28 | – | $681 |
| Total valid votes/expense limit | | 50,359 | 99.27 | – | $66,100 |
| Total rejected ballots | | 368 | 0.73 | – | |
| Turnout | | 50,727 | 61.62 | – | |
| Eligible voters | | 82,322 | | | |
| Reform notional hold | | Swing | | –3.14 | |
Source: Elections Canada
