= Jagrup Brar =

Canadian politician

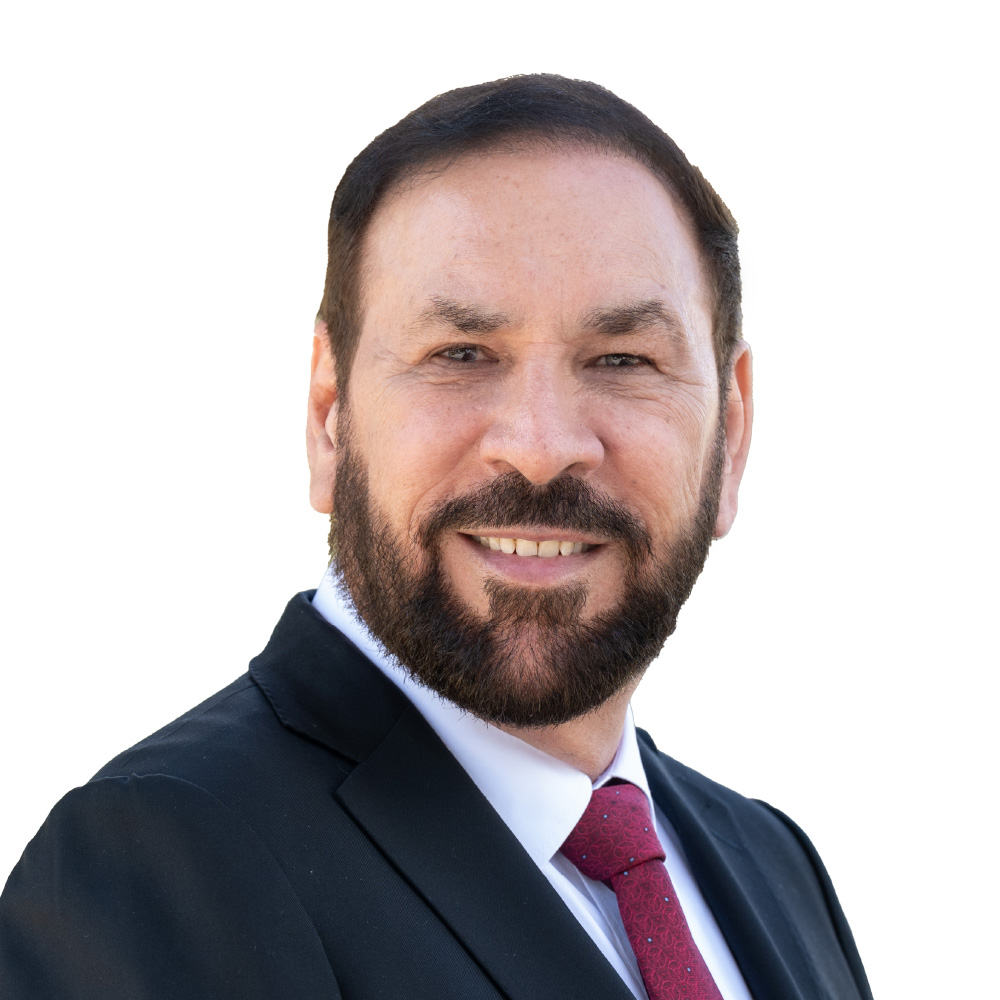
- Campaign portrait, 2024

Minister of Mining and Critical Minerals of British Columbia
- In office November 18, 2024 – November 20, 2026
- Premier: David Eby
- Preceded by: Josie Osborne (Energy, Mines and Low Carbon Innovation)

Minister of State for Trade of British Columbia
- In office December 7, 2022 – November 18, 2024
- Premier: David Eby
- Preceded by: George Chow
- Succeeded by: Rick Glumac

Member of the British Columbia Legislative Assembly
- In office May 9, 2017 – October 24, 2026
- Preceded by: Peter Fassbender
- Succeeded by: Garry Purewal
- Constituency: Surrey-Fleetwood
- In office May 12, 2009 – May 14, 2013
- Preceded by: Constituency established
- Succeeded by: Peter Fassbender
- Constituency: Surrey-Fleetwood
- In office October 28, 2004 – May 12, 2009
- Preceded by: Gulzar Cheema
- Succeeded by: Stephanie Cadieux
- Constituency: Surrey-Panorama Ridge

Personal details
- Born: 1957 or 1958 (age 68–69) Bathinda District, Punjab, India
- Party: New Democratic
- Education: University of Manitoba (MPA)

Jagrup Brar is a Indian-Canadian politician who served as a member of the Legislative Assembly of British Columbia (MLA) representing the electoral district of Surrey-Panorama Ridge from 2004 to 2009, then Surrey-Fleetwood from 2009 to 2013 and again from 2017 to 2026. A member of the British Columbia New Democratic Party (BC NDP), he served as Minister of Mining and Critical Minerals. Previously, he served as the Minister of State for Trade from 2022 until 2024.

== Background ==
Born in Bathinda District, Punjab, India, Brar was part of the India men's national basketball team. He moved to Canada to study at the University of Manitoba, where he received a Master's degree in Public Administration. He then moved to Surrey, British Columbia, where he worked in career and entrepreneurship development for non-profit organizations, including as executive director of the Surrey Self Employment and Entrepreneur Development Society (SEEDS).

He has two children with wife Rajwant.

== Political career ==
He first entered politics by running as the NDP candidate in the October 2004 by-election for the riding of Surrey-Panorama Ridge, triggered by the resignation of BC Liberal MLA Gulzar Cheema. He won the by-election with 6,740 votes (53.59%), defeating Liberal candidate Mary Polak to become a member of British Columbia's 37th Legislative Assembly. He was re-elected to the legislature by winning 11,553 votes (53.17%) in the 2005 provincial election, and served as opposition deputy caucus chair and opposition critic for public safety and the Solicitor General in the 38th Legislative Assembly.

With the NDP reserving the Surrey-Panorama riding for a female candidate in the 2009 provincial election, Brar instead contested the newly established riding of Surrey-Fleetwood, winning the seat by 1,992 votes. He was named critic for small business by NDP leader Adrian Dix in April 2011.

In early 2012, Brar participated in the Raise the Rates MLA Welfare Challenge by living on $610 for one month, the standard wage given to welfare recipients in BC at the time. Brar lived in a small room in Vancouver's Downtown Eastside for part of the month-long challenge. He lost 26 pounds during the event and reported feeling constantly hungry and his mind "fuzzy" due to a lack of adequate nutrition and sleep. He kept a blog of his experiences and the media exposure surrounding the event significantly raised public awareness of welfare rates in BC.

In August 2012, Brar was criticized by Liberal MLA Bill Bennett for praising Cuba's health and education system on a Punjabi radio station after a holiday in the communist country.

He was defeated in the 2013 provincial election by BC Liberal candidate Peter Fassbender by 200 votes. He then ran for president of the BC NDP but lost to Craig Keating at the November 2013 party convention.

In the 2017 provincial election Brar defeated Fassbender in a re-match, then won re-election in the 2020 provincial election. He was acclaimed as caucus chair for the governing NDP on November 10, 2021, replacing outgoing chair Bob D'Eith.

On December 7, 2022, he was named Minister of State for Trade by Premier David Eby. After the 2024 election, he was named Minister of Mining and Critical Minerals.

== Electoral history ==
2026 British Columbia general election: Surrey-Fleetwood
Party	Candidate	Votes	%	±%	Expenditures
Conservative	Garry Purewal	9,471	50.86	+5.94	
New Democratic	Jagrup Brar	7,086	38.05	−10.56	
Green	Tim Binnema	1,122	6.03	−0.44	
OneBC	Carolyn Hofbauer	530	2.85	–	
CentreBC	Paul Brar	413	2.22	–	
Total valid votes		18,622	100.00	–	
Total rejected ballots		39	0.21	+0.08	
Turnout		18,661			
Registered voters					
Conservative gain from New Democratic		Swing		+8.25	
Source: Elections BC

2024 British Columbia general election: Surrey-Fleetwood
Party	Candidate	Votes	%	±%	Expenditures
New Democratic	Jagrup Brar	9,923	48.61	−13.19	
Conservative	Avtar Gill	9,172	44.92	+44.42	
Green	Tim Binnema	1,321	6.47	−1.63	
Total valid votes		20,416	100.00	–	
Total rejected ballots		26	0.13		
Turnout		20,440	54.14		
Registered voters		37,753			
New Democratic notional hold		Swing		–28.81	
Source: Elections BC

2020 British Columbia general election: Surrey-Fleetwood
Party	Candidate	Votes	%	±%	Expenditures
New Democratic	Jagrup Brar	11,457	60.93	+7.51	$61,844.02
Liberal	Garry Thind	5,776	30.72	−5.03	$62,863.75
Green	Dean McGee	1,571	8.35	−2.48	$702.09
Total valid votes		18,804	100.00	–	
Total rejected ballots		138	0.73	−0.04	
Turnout		18,942	50.77	−8.75	
Registered voters		37,309			
Source: Elections BC

2017 British Columbia general election: Surrey-Fleetwood
Party	Candidate	Votes	%	±%	Expenditures
New Democratic	Jagrup Brar	11,085	53.58	+9.17	$74,487
Liberal	Peter Fassbender	7,599	36.73	−8.70	$66,268
Green	Tim Binnema	2,004	9.69	+3.88	$879
Total valid votes		20,688	100.00	–	
Total rejected ballots		160	0.77	+0.10	
Turnout		20,848	59.52	+3.80	
Registered voters		35,025			
Source: Elections BC

2013 British Columbia general election: Surrey-Fleetwood
Party	Candidate	Votes	%	±%	Expenditures
Liberal	Peter Fassbender	8,974	45.43	+5.89	$191,875
New Democratic	Jagrup Brar	8,774	44.41	−4.88	$74,514
Green	Tim Binnema	1,147	5.81	−0.62	$1,641
Conservative	Murali Krishnan	801	4.05	−0.66	$1,275
Vision	Arvin Kumar	59	0.30	–	$2,195
Total valid votes		19,755	100.00	–	
Total rejected ballots		134	0.67	−0.33	
Turnout		19,889	55.72	+1.76	
Registered voters		35,692			
Source: Elections BC

British Columbia provincial government of David Eby
Cabinet post (1)
Predecessor	Office	Successor
George Chow	Minister of State for Trade; December 7, 2022 –	Incumbent
