= Sukh Dhaliwal =

Canadian businessman and politician

Sukh Dhaliwal MP
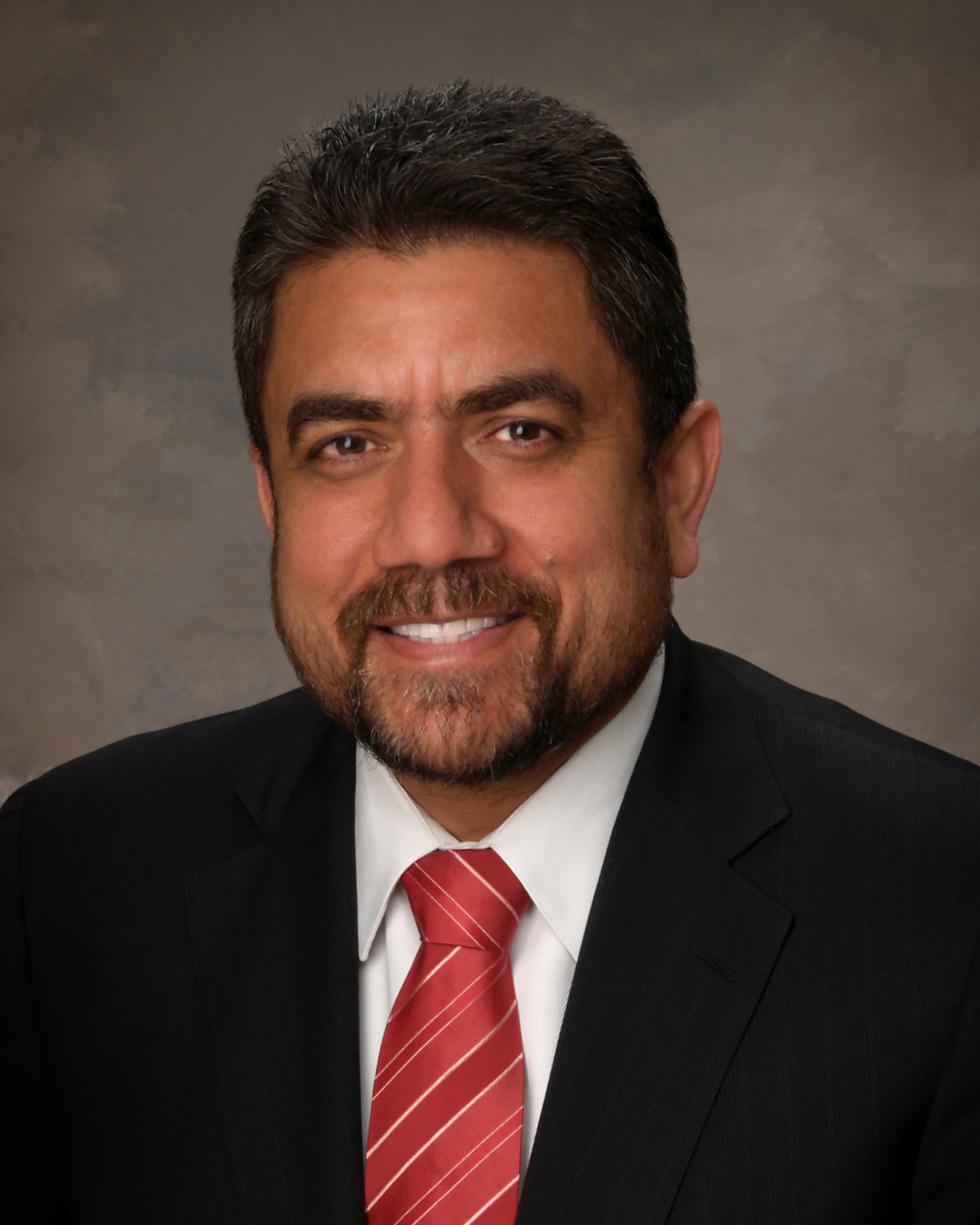
- Dhaliwal in 2008

Member of Parliament
- Incumbent
- Assumed office October 19, 2015
- Preceded by: Jinny Sims
- Constituency: Surrey Newton
- In office January 23, 2006 – May 2, 2011
- Preceded by: Gurmant Grewal
- Succeeded by: Jinny Sims
- Constituency: Newton—North Delta

Personal details
- Born: Sukhminder Singh Dhaliwal; October 1, 1960 (age 66) Sujapur, Punjab, India
- Party: Liberal
- Other political affiliations: BC Liberal (2013); United Surrey (2022); Surrey Electors Team (1999)
- Spouse: Balwinder "Roni" Kaur Dhaliwal
- Profession: Businessman, politician

Sukhminder "Sukh" Singh Dhaliwal MP (born October 1, 1960) is a Canadian businessman and politician, who has served as the Liberal Member of Parliament for Surrey—Newton since 2015. He was previously the Member of Parliament for Newton—North Delta from 2006 to 2011.

== Early life ==
Dhaliwal was born to a Sikh family in Sujapur, Punjab, India on October 1, 1960. In 1983, he studied civil engineering from Guru Nanak Dev Engineering College in Ludhiana. Dhaliwal immigrated to Canada in 1999 and became a Canadian citizen three years later. As a businessman, he co-founded a land surveying company. He ran for city council in the November 1999 Surrey municipal elections for the Surrey Electors Team alongside its mayoral candidate Doug McCallum, but was not elected.

== Political career ==
=== Member of Parliament for Newton—North Delta (2004–2011) ===
Dhaliwal was the federal Liberal candidate for the Newton-North Delta riding in 2004, but lost to Conservative Gurmant Grewal by just over 500 votes. Grewal decided to not seek re-election and, in 2006, Dhaliwal faced Conservative newcomer Phil Eidsvik. The NDP was also strong in the riding and 2004 candidate Nancy Clegg also ran again. Dhaliwal succeeded in winning the seat by exactly 1,000 votes.

In the 2006 Liberal leadership campaign, Dhaliwal initially indicated support for Joe Volpe, but soon moved to support Michael Ignatieff. Dhaliwal was instrumental in building support for Ignatieff's campaign in the Sikh community. Dhaliwal played a key role in Ignatieff's short-lived, but successful, second leadership campaign in 2008.

Dhaliwal in 2008 had written to a U.S. District Court judge on official House of Commons stationery in support of convicted international drug trafficker Ranjit Cheema.

On October 14, 2008, Dhaliwal was re-elected to Parliament by nearly 2,500 votes. Following the election, Dhaliwal was elected as the Chair of the Northern and Western Caucus of the Liberal Party, and served as the critic for the Asia Pacific Gateway and Western Economic Diversification Canada.

Dhaliwal has served on several House of Commons Committees: International Trade; Transportation, Infrastructure and Communities; and Access to Information, Privacy and Ethics. The Ethics Committee attracted high-profile attention when it investigated allegations surrounding Karlheinz Schreiber’s dealings with former Prime Minister Brian Mulroney.

Dhaliwal lost his seat to Jinny Sims of the New Democratic Party in the 2011 federal election.

=== Provincial politics ===
Dhaliwal was acclaimed as the candidate for the British Columbia Liberal Party for the 2013 provincial election. However, he later withdrew after he was charged with six counts of tax evasion related to a business he ran with his wife. He pleaded guilty to three of the charges and was fined $3,000.

=== Member of Parliament for Surrey—Newton (2015–present) ===
In December 2014, Dhaliwal won the Liberal nomination in newly-formed riding of Surrey—Newton ahead of the 2015 election. He defeated NDP incumbent Jinny Sims and won the seat with 56 per cent of the vote.

In 2021, in the Lakhimpur Kheri massacre in India, 8 people died in a vehicle-ramming attack. Shaken by the video of the incident Dhaliwal called it a terror attack no different than London, Ontario truck attack.

In August 2024, Dhaliwal sponsored a petition calling on the government to order a new inquiry into the Air India bombing, a terror act perpetrated by Sikh extremists, which killed 329 people, most of them Canadians. The petition promotes a discredited theory that the Indian government, as opposed to Canadian Sikhs, was responsible for the bombing. Two Canadian public inquires held Sikh extremists responsible for the act, and Talwinder Singh Parmar as the mastermind, in addition the CSIS and RCMP investigated the possibility of Indian government agents provoking the attack, but have since discarded the theory. The petition was drafted by Gurpreet Singh, a freelance journalist based in Surrey. Singh told The Globe and Mail that Dhaliwal's staff helped him draft and edit the petition.

In December 2024, Dhaliwal attempted to introduce a motion in the House of Commons seeking recognition of the 1984 anti-Sikh riots in India as a "genocide". Chandra Arya, among other MPs, called out "no" while Dhaliwal was reading the motion, denying it unanimous support. Arya accused Dhaliwal of threatening him on his way out of the Commons chamber after the motion failed.

Dhaliwal endorsed Liberal Party of Canada leadership candidate Mark Carney on January 16, 2025.

He was elected joint chair of the Standing Joint Committee on the Library of Parliament in the 45th Canadian Parliament in 2025.

== Electoral record ==
2025 Canadian federal election: Surrey Newton
Party	Candidate	Votes	%	±%	Expenditures
Liberal	Sukh Dhaliwal	20,263	49.45	–4.98	$114,030.03
Conservative	Harjit Singh Gill	18,023	43.99	+28.77	$103,027.94
New Democratic	Raj Singh Toor	2,467	6.02	–20.06	$11,159.06
Communist	Salman Zafar	222	0.54	–	none listed
Total valid votes/expense limit		40,975	99.06	–	$120,300.63
Total rejected ballots		387	0.94	–0.16	
Turnout		41,362	63.66	+7.56	
Eligible voters		64,971			
Liberal notional hold		Swing		–16.88	
Source: Elections Canada

2022 Surrey mayoral election
Party	Mayoral candidate	Vote	%
Surrey Connect	Brenda Locke	33,311	28.14
Safe Surrey Coalition	Doug McCallum (X)	32,338	27.31
Surrey First	Gordie Hogg	24,916	21.05
Surrey Forward	Jinny Sims	14,895	12.58
United Surrey	Sukh Dhaliwal	9,629	8.13
People's Council Surrey	Amrit Birring	2,270	1.92
Independent	John Wolanski	646	0.55
Independent	Kuldip Pelia	385	0.33

2021 Canadian federal election: Surrey—Newton
Party	Candidate	Votes	%	±%	Expenditures
Liberal	Sukh Dhaliwal	19,721	53.87	+8.83	$95,083.75
New Democratic	Avneet Johal	9,536	26.05	–3.18	$22,609.98
Conservative	Syed Mohsin	5,758	15.73	–5.23	$10,627.85
People's	Pamela Singh	967	2.64	+1.09	$1,484.10
Independent	Parveer Hundal	628	1.72	–	$7,216.08
Total valid votes/expense limit		36,610	98.91	–	$104,887.75
Total rejected ballots		404	1.09	–0.09	
Turnout		37,014	56.10	–6.77	
Eligible voters		65,973			
Liberal hold		Swing		+6.01	
Source: Elections Canada

2019 Canadian federal election: Surrey—Newton
Party	Candidate	Votes	%	±%	Expenditures
Liberal	Sukh Dhaliwal	18,960	45.04	–10.94	$90,758.68
New Democratic	Harjit Singh Gill	12,306	29.23	+3.12	$97,110.63
Conservative	Harpreet Singh	8,824	20.96	+5.25	$104,840.23
Green	Rabaab Khehra	1,355	3.22	+1.02	none listed
People's	Holly Verchère	653	1.55	–	$896.00
Total valid votes/expense limit		42,098	98.81	–	$102,264.49
Total rejected ballots		505	1.19	+0.45	
Turnout		42,603	62.87	–4.98	
Eligible voters		67,763			
Liberal hold		Swing		–7.03	
Source: Elections Canada

2015 Canadian federal election: Surrey—Newton
Party	Candidate	Votes	%	±%	Expenditures
Liberal	Sukh Dhaliwal	24,869	55.98	+21.90	$165,127.94
New Democratic	Jinny Sims	11,602	26.12	–9.17	$121,583.62
Conservative	Harpreet Singh	6,978	15.71	–11.71	$89,371.95
Green	Pamela Sangha	975	2.19	–0.40	none listed
Total valid votes/expense limit		44,424	99.27	–	$199,113.86
Total rejected ballots		328	0.73	–	
Turnout		44,752	67.85	–	
Eligible voters		65,954			
Liberal notional gain from New Democratic		Swing		+15.54	
Source: Elections Canada

2011 Canadian federal election: Newton—North Delta
Party	Candidate	Votes	%	±%	Expenditures
New Democratic	Jinny Sims	15,413	33.42	+7.29	$77,719.25
Liberal	Sukh Dhaliwal	14,510	31.46	–4.96	$74,338.64
Conservative	Mani Fallon	14,437	31.30	+0.39	$75,595.27
Green	Liz Walker	1,520	3.30	–2.30	none listed
Independent	Ravi S. Gill	123	0.27	–	$5,095.65
Communist	Samuel Frank Hammond	116	0.25	–0.02	$306.07
Total valid votes/expense limit		46,119	99.37	–	$85,439.40
Total rejected ballots		294	0.63	+0.07	
Turnout		46,413	61.45	–0.62	
Eligible voters		75,535			
New Democratic gain from Liberal		Swing		+5.79	
Source: Elections Canada

2008 Canadian federal election: Newton—North Delta
Party	Candidate	Votes	%	±%	Expenditures
Liberal	Sukh Dhaliwal	16,481	36.42	+2.17	$81,327.89
Conservative	Sandeep Pandher	13,988	30.91	+0.29	$78,520.57
New Democratic	Teresa Townsley	11,824	26.13	–5.83	$40,898.10
Green	Liz Walker	2,533	5.60	+3.65	$2,243.32
Independent	James William Miller-Cousineau	179	0.40	–	none listed
Independent	John Shavluk	126	0.28	–	none listed
Communist	Harjit Daudharia	121	0.27	+0.01	$377.54
Total valid votes/expense limit		45,252	99.44	–	$81,605.45
Total rejected ballots		255	0.56	+0.16	
Turnout		45,507	62.07	–1.02	
Eligible voters		73,317			
Liberal hold		Swing		+4.00	
Source: Elections Canada

2006 Canadian federal election: Newton—North Delta
Party	Candidate	Votes	%	±%	Expenditures
Liberal	Sukh Dhaliwal	15,006	34.25	+2.69	$67,987.74
New Democratic	Nancy Clegg	14,006	31.96	+2.77	$49,197.21
Conservative	Phil Eidsvik	13,416	30.62	–2.20	$72,801.42
Green	Sunny Athwal	853	1.95	–4.25	$12,580.23
Independent	Rob Girn	319	0.73	–	none listed
Communist	Harjit Daudharia	112	0.26	+0.02	$379.38
Independent	Mike Saifie	106	0.24	–	none listed
Total valid votes/expense limit		43,818	99.60	–	$75,124.92
Total rejected ballots		174	0.40	–0.13	
Turnout		43,992	63.09	+0.10	
Eligible voters		69,725			
Liberal gain from Conservative		Swing		+2.45	
Source: Elections Canada

2004 Canadian federal election: Newton—North Delta
Party	Candidate	Votes	%	±%	Expenditures
Conservative	Gurmant Grewal	13,529	32.82	–	$72,183.08
Liberal	Sukh Dhaliwal	13,009	31.55	–	$64,235.28
New Democratic	Nancy Clegg	12,037	29.20	–	$24,563.59
Green	John Hague	2,555	6.20	–	$2,736.63
Communist	Nazir Rizvi	98	0.24	–	$389.84
Total valid votes/expense limit		41,228	99.48	–	$72,282.76
Total rejected ballots		216	0.52	–	
Turnout		41,444	62.99	–	
Eligible voters		65,794			
Source: Elections Canada
