= Barundi, Punjab =

Barundi
- village
- Interactive map of Barundi
- Coordinates: 30°40′03.01″N 75°42′51.35″E
- Country: India
- State: Punjab
- District: Ludhiana

Languages
  - Official: Punjabi
- Time zone: UTC+5:30 (IST)
- Nearest city: Ahmedgarh/Raikot
- Lok Sabha constituency: Fatehgarh Sahib
- Climate: Hot in summer and cold in winter (Köppen)

Barundi is a village located in the Ludhiana district of the state of Punjab in India. With a population of more than 4166, Barundi is one of the largest villages in Ludhiana.Barundi is also known for its state of the art drainage system and sewage treatment plant. Apart from these the village has its great religious significance too.

== Village ==
The village is divided into four parts (known as patties), The four patties are:

- Rokon Patti
- Maan Patti
- Sekhon Patti
- Bhoju Patti

There are several religious places in Barundi. This village has its own sports complex. This village has DDR too. There is also a new gym now and all the latest facilities available to youth in the gym.

There is a primary school, senior secondary school and a women's college in this village.

== People ==
1. Late Master Joginder Singh (Sekhon Patti, Sekhon clan) born in 1900 who was a school teacher, Sikh scholar, Social reformer who played key role in promoting Sikhism and Education in the village and the region. He played leading role in setting up Gurdwara in Patti Sekhon in around 1935 that had the biggest hall in the region at that time. Late Gaini Amolak Singh spent his childhood at the village under the guidance of Master Joginder Singh and he contributed worldwide in promoting Sikhism, Sikhi values and Kirtan. He served as the President of Gurdwara Sri Guru Singh Sabha Southall London, served as Jethadaar of Guru Nanak Nishkam Sevak Jatha, held many key posts and played an instrumental role in many Sikh issues worldwide. He often expressed his love and affection for Barundi in his lectures and talks. His melodious Kirtan became very popular and all his life he did Kirtan Seva for free purely as true Seva. He has very large following worldwide.

2. Sardar Daya Singh Barundi (Roko Patti, Pannu clan), a modest man who later became the sarpanch of the village was born in 1907. He is remembered as a social activist, reformer and one whose contribution in the freedom movement of India cannot be forgotten. He went to jail during the days of JAITO MORCHA and even played a vital role in ‘THE GREAT ESCAPE’ of Sardar Bhagat Singh and Durga Bhabi from Lahore.

His commitment towards nation was recognized when he was conferred with TAMRA PATRA for his contribution as a freedom fighter by Late Smt. Indira Gandhi, the Prime minister of India on the eve of the 25th independence day of our country.

Sardar Daya singh worked tirelessly for the upliftment and betterment of his native village. He was the one who introduce first bus service from Ludhiana to Barundi by constructing a motorable road from Pakhowal to Barundi which was earlier available till Pakhowal. His uniting efforts extended the metalled road to barundi. Though this task was tedious and cumbersome was materialized by him. His perseverance did not end here. He also took the initiative to implement the “Ahmedgarh-Raikot Road Project” by involving neighbouring villagers for earth filling up to the required road level and then put pressure on the concerned government department for the construction of a "Pacca metalled" road. His persistence got the project completed which effected comfortable and safe connectivity of all the adjoining villages as well.

He did not stop here. He wished to see his village progress and this is not possible without the literate and educated people, where he played a vital role for organizing sanction and construction of Higher secondary school from education minister of Punjab. Sardar Daya Singh ji's love for his country and his village motivated him to devote all his time for his people till he died in July 1982, following his footsteps, today Barundi is a modern and well-developed village.

3. Sardar Narinder Singh (Sekhon Patti, Sekhon clan), retired headteacher, eminent community and charity worker who served the village and the region supporting poor children with education, helping people to learn Gurbani and he played an instrumental role in the management committee of local Gurdwara.

4.Canadian Politician Gurmant Grewal was born in Patti Sekhon at Barundi who played leading role in international politics, community and social service. He and his wife Narinder Kaur Grewal (Nina Grewal) both served at MPs in Canadian Parliament setting a new record as first Asian and first Sikh couple outside India to serve as MPs in the Parliament of a nation.

5. Diversity and Social Inclusion Activist from the UK, Charan Kanwal Singh Sekhon MBE come from Barundi. He is the founder and chairman of Social Education Voluntary Association (SEVA) Trust UK which is an international NGO working in UK and India on Education, Environment and Health. SEVA Trust UK has already supported over 100 students from low income families from this village and over 10,000 students in Punjab and Haryana states. Mr Sekhon is the first Sikh to receive 'British Asian Pride of Britain Award' at the House of Commons, London in June 2013. He received many other awards for his community and charity work including Bedford Mayor's Citizen of the Year Award, Sikh Role Model Award, Award for Promoting Community Cohesion and Understanding. He was the first Turban wearing Sikh to serve as Senior Officer with UK Govt. Environment Agency for East of England region and he got elected as Town Councillor for Kempston Town Council in 2002 and in 2008 became Parish Councillor for Sharnbrook. He is playing leading role in SEVA Trust UK to support and uplift low income students especially girls education in many rural areas of Punjab and Haryana. Charan Sekhon has been awarded an MBE by HM the Queen in the New Year's Honours List 2022 issued by the Cabinet Office (UK Govt) for services to charity, diversity and the environment, particularly during the COVID-19 pandemic.

References: See Below in reference section the links to media and web references.

== See also ==
- Gurmant Grewal
- Nina Grewal
