= Sujapur =

Sujapur may refer to:

- Sujapur, Malda
- Sujapur, Punjab
- Sujapur (Vidhan Sabha constituency), an assembly constituency in Malda district in the Indian state of West Bengal
