= Bryan Tepper =

Canadian politician

Bryan Tepper MLA

Member of the Legislative Assembly of British Columbia for Surrey-Panorama
- Incumbent
- Assumed office October 19, 2024
- Preceded by: Jinny Sims

Parliamentary Secretary of Urban Policing
- Incumbent
- Assumed office November 20, 2026
- Preceded by: Office Established

Personal details
- Party: BC Conservatives

Bryan Tepper is a Canadian politician who was elected to the Legislative Assembly of British Columbia in the 2024 British Columbia general election. He represents the electoral district of Surrey-Panorama as a member of the Conservative Party of British Columbia.

== Early life and career ==
Tepper has resided in the community of Ocean Park in Surrey, British Columbia for 2 decades with his wife Rona and their three children. He worked as a RCMP police officer and was transferred to the city of Surrey in 2004. During his career, he led a watch in District 3 in Newton/Panorama. He retired by the time of the 2024 British Columbia general election.

Beyond his professional roles, Tepper and his wife are active volunteers in multiple organizations in their community including the Ocean Park Community Association, Crescent Beach Property Owners Association, the Crescent Beach Swim Club, Surrey Orcas Water Polo, and Crescent Beach Yacht Club.

During his career as an RCMP officer he served as the treasurer of the Mounted Police Professional Association of Canada (MPPAC). As treasurer he was involved in securing the right to associate for RCMP members, paving the way for representation for RCMP members, by winning a landmark lawsuit against the federal government.

== Political career ==
=== 2024 Conservative Nomination ===
Tepper sought the Conservative Party nomination to be a candidate in the 2017 South Surrey—White Rock federal by-election but lost to Kerry-Lynne Findlay.

Tepper was originally nominated as the Conservative Party of British Columbia candidate in neighbouring Surrey-White Rock for the 2024 provincial election. However, after BC United abruptly ended its campaign to collaborate with the Conservatives, Tepper was moved to Surrey-Panorama to allow Trevor Halford, the incumbent BC United to run as the party's candidate in Surrey-White Rock.

=== 2024 Election and Conservative Leadership ===
On election night, he defeated NDP incumbent Jinny Sims with 49.6% of the votes, a slim margin of 263 votes. He currently serves as the Critic for Community Safety and Integrated Services.

== Policy positions ==
Tepper has shared that healthcare reform is a main priority, including by addressing recruitment and retention challenges, emergency room closures, and delayed patient care. He has shared his belief that reducing administrative burdens such as cutting red tape will make BC a more attractive place for medical professionals.

Tepper serves as the Critic for Community Safety and Integrated Services. He has shared his intention to use his background in public safety to promote an approach that emphasizes collaboration on agencies and integrated community services. He has shared his belief that effective drug policy should include a tough-on-crime approach to tackling the issue of drug diversion and a plan for compassionate rehabilitation.

His stated priority issues are: crime and drug addiction, health care reform, and economy and affordability.

== Political controversies ==
On March 4, 2025, amid a trade war between Canada and the US started by US president Donald Trump, Tepper introduced the YouTuber Jasper Sunshine, better known as MisterSunshineBaby, to the Legislative Assembly house as a guest. The BC NDP immediately criticized the invitation of Sunshine, who has espoused pro-Trump views on his social media.

== Electoral record ==
2026 British Columbia general election: Surrey-Panorama
Party	Candidate	Votes	%	±%	Expenditures
Conservative	Bryan Tepper	9,409	58.82		
New Democratic	Jinny Sims	5,334	33.34		
Green	Nolen Scott	807	5.04	—	
CentreBC	Manav Manro	426	2.66	—	
Total valid votes		15,976	99.87		
Total rejected ballots		21	0.13		
Turnout		15,997			
Registered voters					
Conservative hold		Swing		+11.88	
Source: Elections BC

2024 British Columbia general election: Surrey-Panorama
Party	Candidate	Votes	%	±%	Expenditures
Conservative	Bryan Tepper	8,735	49.6%		
New Democratic	Jinny Sims	8,472	48.1%	-6.97	
Freedom	Paramjit Rai	404	2.3%		
Total valid votes		17,611	–		
Total rejected ballots					
Turnout					
Registered voters					
Source: Elections BC

== See also ==
- 43rd Parliament of British Columbia
