= Gulzar Singh Cheema =

Indian-born Canadian physician and politician (born 1954)

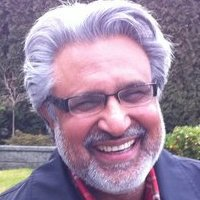

Member of the Legislative Assembly of British Columbia for Surrey-Panorama Ridge
- In office May 16, 2001 – May 23, 2004
- Preceded by: Riding established
- Succeeded by: Jagrup Brar

Member of the Legislative Assembly of Manitoba for The Maples
- In office September 11, 1990 – June 17, 1993
- Preceded by: Riding established
- Succeeded by: Gary Kowalski

Member of the Legislative Assembly of Manitoba for Kildonan
- In office April 26, 1988 – September 11, 1990
- Preceded by: Marty Dolin
- Succeeded by: Dave Chomiak

Minister of State for Mental Health of British Columbia
- In office June 5, 2001 – January 26, 2004
- Premier: Gordon Campbell
- Preceded by: Position established
- Succeeded by: Susan Brice (Minister of State for Mental Health and Addiction Services)

Minister of State for Immigration and Multicultural Services of British Columbia
- In office January 26, 2004 – March 8, 2004
- Premier: Gordon Campbell
- Preceded by: Position established
- Succeeded by: Patrick Wong

Personal details
- Born: August 11, 1954 (age 72) India
- Party: Manitoba Liberal Party; British Columbia Liberal Party; Liberal Party of Canada
- Spouse: Harinder Cheema
- Profession: physician

Gulzar Singh Cheema (born August 11, 1954) is an Indian-born Canadian physician and politician. He was a member of the Legislative Assembly of Manitoba from 1988 to 1993, and a member of the Legislative Assembly of British Columbia from 2001 to 2004, making him one of only a few Canadian politicians to have sat in two provincial legislatures since Confederation. He is the first Indian-born provincial legislator in Canada. He was also a cabinet minister in the government of Premier of British Columbia Gordon Campbell from 2001 to 2004, and was a candidate of the Liberal Party of Canada in the federal election of 2004.

== Background ==
The son of Ajinder Singh Cheema and Ajit Kaur Aulakh, he grew up in Gurdaspur district in Punjab, India. He received a bachelor's degree in medicine and surgery from Punjab University in 1977, then worked as a clinical instructor. He moved to Canada in 1979, and married Harinder Claire the same year; they have two children together. Following his internship at the Memorial University of Newfoundland and residency at Saskatoon's Royal University Hospital, he moved to Winnipeg where he practised as a family physician from 1984 to 1993.

== Political career ==
=== Manitoba politics ===
Formerly a member of the Manitoba New Democratic Party (NDP), in the Manitoba general election of 1988, Cheema was elected as a Liberal in the Winnipeg riding of Kildonan. The Liberals went from one to twenty seats in the Manitoba legislature in this election, winning several Winnipeg seats from the governing NDP. Cheema defeated Progressive Conservative candidate John Baluta by 585 votes, with NDP incumbent Marty Dolin finishing third. The Progressive Conservatives came out of the election with a minority government, and Cheema became a member of the official opposition. Cheema increased his margin of victory in the 1990 provincial election when he ran in the new riding of The Maples, but the Liberal Party fell to seven seats and third-party status. During his time in the Manitoba assembly, he served as critic for health, labour, housing, native affairs, sport and co-operatives, and consumer and corporate affairs. He resigned his seat on June 17, 1993.

=== British Columbia politics ===
Soon afterwards, Cheema opened a family practice in Surrey, British Columbia. He became involved in several community activities in British Columbia, including acting as chair of the 1998 British Columbia Games for Athletes with Disabilities' medical section. He also made regular appearances on local multicultural radio talk shows and television station OMNI BC (previously Channel M) to educate the Indo-Canadian community on health and disease prevention.

In the 1996 provincial election, Cheema ran as a BC Liberal in the riding of Vancouver-Fraserview, but lost to BC NDP candidate Ian Waddell by 380 votes.

The BC NDP experienced a sharp decline in popularity in the following years, and the provincial Liberals were elected in a landslide in the 2001 provincial election. This time Cheema ran in Surrey-Panorama Ridge, where he defeated NDP candidate Bruce Ralston by over 6,000 votes to become the riding's member of the Legislative Assembly (MLA). He was appointed to the cabinet that June by Premier Gordon Campbell to serve as Minister of State for Mental Health, before being re-assigned in January 2004 as Minister of State for Immigration and Multicultural Services.

=== Federal politics ===
Later in 2004, Cheema sought and won the federal Liberal nomination in the new riding of Fleetwood—Port Kells. His cabinet appointment was rescinded on March 8, 2004, and he subsequently resigned as MLA that May. At the June 2004 federal election, Cheema was defeated by Conservative candidate Nina Grewal, 14,052 votes to 11,568 (New Democratic Party candidate Barry Bell received 10,976 votes).

=== Attempt return to BC politics ===
In the 2020 provincial election, Cheema was the BC Liberal candidate in Surrey-Panorama, a reconfigured version of his old riding. He was defeated by incumbent NDP member Jinny Sims.

== Honours ==
Cheema was awarded the Canada 125 Medal in 1992 for community service. In 2021, a new street in northwest Winnipeg was named Cheema Drive in his honour.

== Election results ==
1988 Manitoba general election: Kildonan
Party	Candidate	Votes	%	±%
Liberal	Gulzar Singh Cheema	5,653	35.69	26.24
Progressive Conservative	John Baluta	5,068	31.99	-3.08
New Democratic	Marty Dolin	4,542	28.67	-22.98
Progressive	Sidney Green	445	2.81	-1.02
Western Independence	Tracy Fuhr	133	0.84	–
Total valid votes		15,841	–	–
Rejected		56	–	
Eligible voters / turnout		20,785	76.48	13.01
Liberal gain from New Democratic		Swing		+24.61
Source(s) Source: Manitoba. Chief Electoral Officer (1999). Statement of Votes for the 37th Provincial General Election, September 21, 1999 (PDF) (Report). Winnipeg: Elections Manitoba.

1990 Manitoba general election: The Maples
Party	Candidate	Votes	%	
Liberal	Gulzar Singh Cheema	3,273	39.83	
Progressive Conservative	Norman Isler	2,684	32.66	
New Democratic	Tony Valeri	2,260	27.50	
Total valid votes		8,217	100.00	-
Rejected ballots		36		
Turnout		8,253	67.00	
Eligible voters		12,318		
Source: Elections Manitoba

2004 Canadian federal election: Fleetwood—Port Kells
Party	Candidate	Votes	%	±%	Expenditures
Conservative	Nina Grewal	14,052	35.80	–	$67,118.70
Liberal	Gulzar Singh Cheema	11,568	29.47	–	$65,800.02
New Democratic	Barry Bell	10,976	27.97	–	$7,348.84
Green	David Walters	2,484	6.33	–	none listed
Marxist–Leninist	Joseph Theriault	167	0.43	–	none listed
Total valid votes/expense limit		39,247	99.45	–	$72,408.06
Total rejected ballots		218	0.55	–	
Turnout		39,465	59.06	–	
Eligible voters		66,821			
Source: Elections Canada

2020 British Columbia general election: Surrey-Panorama
Party	Candidate	Votes	%	±%	Expenditures
New Democratic	Jinny Sims	12,336	55.07	+4.22	$60,769.34
Liberal	Gulzar Cheema	9,607	42.89	+1.03	$65,963.02
Vision	Sophie Shrestha	458	2.04	–	$0.00
Total valid votes		22,401	100.00	–	
Total rejected ballots		240	1.06	+0.27	
Turnout		22,641	51.65	−9.39	
Registered voters		43,835			
New Democratic hold		Swing		+1.60	
Source: Elections BC
