= Newton—North Delta =

Former federal electoral district in British Columbia, Canada

British Columbia electoral district
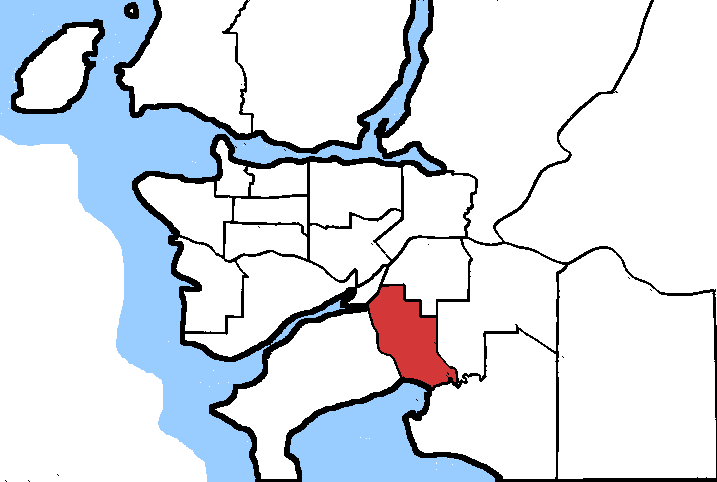
- Newton—North Delta in relation to other federal electoral districts in Vancouver
- Coordinates: 49.131°N 122.886°W

Defunct federal electoral district
- Legislature: House of Commons
- District created: 2003
- District abolished: 2013
- First contested: 2004
- Last contested: 2011
- District webpage: profile, map

Demographics
- Population (2011): 127,954
- Electors (2011): 73,317
- Area (km²): 51.08
- Census division: Greater Vancouver
- Census subdivision(s): Surrey, Delta

Newton—North Delta was a federal electoral district in the province of British Columbia, Canada, that had been represented in the House of Commons of Canada from 2004 to 2015, when it was abolished and redistributed to the Delta and Surrey—Newton electoral districts.

== Geography ==
It is located within the Greater Vancouver Regional District, and consists of the eastern part of the Corporation of Delta and the western and central parts of the City of Surrey.

== Demographics ==
Newton—North Delta has the highest percentage of people of Sikh ethnic origin (27.6%); of native Punjabi speakers (33.4%); of those that use Punjabi as home language (26.8%); as well as of South Asians overall (42.7%), lagging only Richmond - 50.2% Chinese - in terms of population proportion of a single visible minority group.

In terms of religion, it is the federal riding with the highest percentage of Sikhs (27.6%) and, more generally, the highest percentage of people with a non-Judeo-Christian religion affiliation, 38.0% in particular (Sikh: 27.6%, Muslim: 4.3%, Hindu: 4.1%, etc.).

== History ==
The electoral district was created in 2003 from parts of Delta—South Richmond and Surrey Central ridings.

== Members of Parliament ==
The riding has elected the following members of Parliament:

Parliament	Years	Member	Party
Newton—North Delta; Riding created from Delta—South Richmond and Surrey Central
38th	2004–2006	Gurmant Grewal	Conservative
39th	2006–2008	Sukh Dhaliwal	Liberal
40th	2008–2011	Sukh Dhaliwal	Liberal
41st	2011–2015	Jinny Sims	New Democratic
Riding dissolved into Delta and Surrey—Newton

During the 40th Parliament, Dhaliwal was a member of the Standing Committee on Transport, Infrastructure and Communities.

== Election results ==
2011 Canadian federal election
Party	Candidate	Votes	%	±%	Expenditures
New Democratic	Jinny Sims	15,413	33.42	+7.29	$77,719.25
Liberal	Sukh Dhaliwal	14,510	31.46	–4.96	$74,338.64
Conservative	Mani Fallon	14,437	31.30	+0.39	$75,595.27
Green	Liz Walker	1,520	3.30	–2.30	none listed
Independent	Ravi S. Gill	123	0.27	–	$5,095.65
Communist	Samuel Frank Hammond	116	0.25	–0.02	$306.07
Total valid votes/expense limit		46,119	99.37	–	$85,439.40
Total rejected ballots		294	0.63	+0.07	
Turnout		46,413	61.45	–0.62	
Eligible voters		75,535			
New Democratic gain from Liberal		Swing		+5.79	
Source: Elections Canada

2008 Canadian federal election
Party	Candidate	Votes	%	±%	Expenditures
Liberal	Sukh Dhaliwal	16,481	36.42	+2.17	$81,327.89
Conservative	Sandeep Pandher	13,988	30.91	+0.29	$78,520.57
New Democratic	Teresa Townsley	11,824	26.13	–5.83	$40,898.10
Green	Liz Walker	2,533	5.60	+3.65	$2,243.32
Independent	James William Miller-Cousineau	179	0.40	–	none listed
Independent	John Shavluk	126	0.28	–	none listed
Communist	Harjit Daudharia	121	0.27	+0.01	$377.54
Total valid votes/expense limit		45,252	99.44	–	$81,605.45
Total rejected ballots		255	0.56	+0.16	
Turnout		45,507	62.07	–1.02	
Eligible voters		73,317			
Liberal hold		Swing		+4.00	
Source: Elections Canada

2006 Canadian federal election
Party	Candidate	Votes	%	±%	Expenditures
Liberal	Sukh Dhaliwal	15,006	34.25	+2.69	$67,987.74
New Democratic	Nancy Clegg	14,006	31.96	+2.77	$49,197.21
Conservative	Phil Eidsvik	13,416	30.62	–2.20	$72,801.42
Green	Sunny Athwal	853	1.95	–4.25	$12,580.23
Independent	Rob Girn	319	0.73	–	none listed
Communist	Harjit Daudharia	112	0.26	+0.02	$379.38
Independent	Mike Saifie	106	0.24	–	none listed
Total valid votes/expense limit		43,818	99.60	–	$75,124.92
Total rejected ballots		174	0.40	–0.13	
Turnout		43,992	63.09	+0.10	
Eligible voters		69,725			
Liberal gain from Conservative		Swing		+2.45	
Source: Elections Canada

2004 Canadian federal election
Party	Candidate	Votes	%	±%	Expenditures
Conservative	Gurmant Grewal	13,529	32.82	–	$72,183.08
Liberal	Sukh Dhaliwal	13,009	31.55	–	$64,235.28
New Democratic	Nancy Clegg	12,037	29.20	–	$24,563.59
Green	John Hague	2,555	6.20	–	$2,736.63
Communist	Nazir Rizvi	98	0.24	–	$389.84
Total valid votes/expense limit		41,228	99.48	–	$72,282.76
Total rejected ballots		216	0.52	–	
Turnout		41,444	62.99	–	
Eligible voters		65,794			
Source: Elections Canada

== See also ==
- List of Canadian electoral districts
- Historical federal electoral districts of Canada
