= Surrey Newton (federal electoral district) =

Federal electoral district in British Columbia, Canada

British Columbia electoral district
- Interactive map of riding boundaries from the 2025 federal election

Federal electoral district
- Legislature: House of Commons
MP
Sukh Dhaliwal
Liberal
- District created: 2013
- First contested: 2015
- Last contested: 2025
- District webpage: profile, map

Demographics
- Population (2016): 114,605
- Electors (2015): 62,855
- Area (km²): 30
- Pop. density (per km²): 3,820.2
- Census division: Metro Vancouver
- Census subdivision: Surrey (part)

Surrey Newton is a federal electoral district in British Columbia. It encompasses a portion of British Columbia previously included in the electoral districts of Fleetwood—Port Kells, Newton—North Delta and Surrey North.

Originally called Surrey—Newton, the riding was created by the 2012 federal electoral boundaries redistribution and was legally defined in the 2013 representation order. It came into effect upon the call of the 42nd Canadian federal election, which took place October 2015.

The riding takes its name from Newton, Surrey.

Following the 2022 Canadian federal electoral redistribution, this riding was renamed Surrey Newton at the first election held after approximately April 2024. It lost the area south of 64 Ave and west of 126 Street to Delta.

== Demographics ==
Religion in Surrey-Newton (2021)
1. Sikh (51.5%)
2. Christian (16.4%)
3. Muslim (8.70%)
4. Hindu (8.10%)
5. Buddhist (0.90%)
6. Jewish (0.10%)
7. Other (0.40%)
8. Irreligious (13.9%)

According to the 2021 Canadian census

- 28.1% of the population is not a Canadian citizen.
- 61.2% is first generation, 27.3% is second generation, while 11.5% is third generation or more.
- Twenty most common ethnic origins (2021) : 36.2% Indian (India), 17.3% Punjabi, 12.5% Sikh, 4.8% English, 4.7% Canadian, 4.7% Filipino, 3.5% Scottish, 2.9% Pakistani, 2.8% Irish, 2.6% German, 2.5% Chinese, 2.0% Hindu, 2.0% South Asian, 1.7% Fijian, 1.6% French, 1.5% Jatt, 1.2% Ukrainian, 0.9% Asian, 0.9% British Isles, 0.8% Italian.

Panethnic groups in Surrey—Newton (2011−2021)
Panethnic group	2021		2016		2011	
Panethnic group	Pop.	%	Pop.	%	Pop.	%
South Asian	80,820	66.73%	68,880	60.69%	61,635	59.01%
European (Note: Statistic includes all persons that did not make up part of a visible minority or an indigenous identity.)	18,225	15.05%	24,380	21.48%	26,795	25.66%
Southeast Asian (Note: Statistic includes total responses of "Filipino" and "Southeast Asian" under visible minority section on census.)	7,090	5.85%	6,650	5.86%	5,330	5.1%
East Asian (Note: Statistic includes total responses of "Chinese", "Korean", and "Japanese" under visible minority section on census.)	3,595	2.97%	3,765	3.32%	3,525	3.38%
African	2,780	2.3%	2,270	2%	1,375	1.32%
Middle Eastern (Note: Statistic includes total responses of "West Asian" and "Arab" under visible minority section on census.)	2,385	1.97%	1,690	1.49%	1,225	1.17%
Indigenous	1,980	1.63%	2,670	2.35%	2,275	2.18%
Latin American	1,505	1.24%	1,640	1.45%	1,195	1.14%
Other (Note: Statistic includes total responses of "Visible minority, n.i.e." and "Multiple visible minorities" under visible minority section on census.)	2,725	2.25%	1,540	1.36%	1,070	1.02%
Total responses	121,110	99.06%	113,490	99.03%	104,440	99.29%
Total population	122,264	100%	114,605	100%	105,183	100%
Notes: Totals greater than 100% due to multiple origin responses. Demographics based on 2012 Canadian federal electoral redistribution riding boundaries.

== Members of Parliament ==
This riding has elected the following members of the House of Commons of Canada:

Parliament	Years	Member	Party
Surrey—Newton; Riding created from Fleetwood—Port Kells, Newton—North Delta and Surrey North
42nd	2015–2019	Sukh Dhaliwal	Liberal
43rd	2019–2021	Sukh Dhaliwal	Liberal
44th	2021–2025	Sukh Dhaliwal	Liberal
45th	2025–present	Sukh Dhaliwal	Liberal

== Election results ==
Graph of election results in Surrey—Newton (minor parties that never got 2% of the vote or didn't run consistently are omitted)

=== Surrey Newton, 2023 representation order ===
2025 Canadian federal election
** Preliminary results — Not yet official **
Party	Candidate	Votes	%	±%	Expenditures
Liberal	Sukh Dhaliwal	20,263	49.45	–4.98	
Conservative	Harjit Singh Gill	18,023	43.99	+28.77	
New Democratic	Raj Singh Toor	2,467	6.02	–20.06	
Communist	Salman Zafar	222	0.54	N/A	
Total valid votes/expense limit					
Total rejected ballots					
Turnout		40,975	63.81		
Eligible voters		64,212			
Liberal notional hold		Swing		–16.88	
Source: Elections Canada

2021 federal election redistributed results
Party	Vote	%
Liberal	19,071	54.43
New Democratic	9,137	26.08
Conservative	5,334	15.22
People's	914	2.61
Others	583	1.66

=== Surrey—Newton, 2013 representation order ===
2021 Canadian federal election: Surrey—Newton
Party	Candidate	Votes	%	±%	Expenditures
Liberal	Sukh Dhaliwal	19,721	53.9	+8.9	$93,094.29
New Democratic	Avneet Johal	9,536	26.0	−3.2	$22,609.98
Conservative	Syed Mohsin	5,758	15.7	−5.3	$10,627.85
People's	Pamela Singh	967	2.6	+1.0	$1,484.10
Independent	Parveer Hundal	628	1.7	N/A	$7,216.08
Total valid votes/expense limit		36,610	98.9	–	$104,887.75
Total rejected ballots		404	1.1		
Turnout		37,014	56.2		
Eligible voters		65,857			
Liberal hold		Swing		+6.1	
Source: Elections Canada

2019 Canadian federal election: Surrey—Newton
Party	Candidate	Votes	%	±%	Expenditures
Liberal	Sukh Dhaliwal	18,960	45.0	−10.98	$89,331.46
New Democratic	Harjit Singh Gill	12,306	29.2	+3.08	none listed
Conservative	Harpreet Singh	8,824	21.0	+5.29	none listed
Green	Rabaab Khehra	1,355	3.2	+1.01	none listed
People's	Holly Verchère	653	1.6	–	none listed
Total valid votes/expense limit		42,098	100.0		$102,264.49
Total rejected ballots		505	1.19	+0.46	
Turnout		42,603	63.4	−5.66	
Eligible voters		67,247			
Liberal hold		Swing		−7.03	
Source: Elections Canada

2015 Canadian federal election: Surrey—Newton
Party	Candidate	Votes	%	±%	Expenditures
Liberal	Sukh Dhaliwal	24,869	55.98	+21.90	$165,371.15
New Democratic	Jinny Sims	11,602	26.12	−9.17	$123,083.62
Conservative	Harpreet Singh	6,978	15.71	−11.71	$89,371.95
Green	Pamela Sangha	975	2.19	−0.40	—
Total valid votes/expense limit		44,424	100.00		$199,113.86
Total rejected ballots		328	0.73	—	
Turnout		44,752	69.06	—	
Eligible voters		64,798			
Liberal notional gain from New Democratic		Swing		+15.54	
Source: Elections Canada

2011 federal election redistributed results
Party	Vote	%
New Democratic	11,459	35.29
Liberal	11,066	34.08
Conservative	8,903	27.42
Green	844	2.60
Others	199	0.61

== See also ==
- List of Canadian electoral districts
- Historical federal electoral districts of Canada
