= Surrey-Fleetwood =

Provincial electoral district in British Columbia, Canada

British Columbia electoral district
- Location in Surrey

Provincial electoral district
- Legislature: Legislative Assembly of British Columbia
MLA
Garry Purewal
Conservative
- District created: 2008
- First contested: 2009
- Last contested: 2026

Demographics
- Population (2006): 50,284
- Area (km²): 20.44
- Pop. density (per km²): 2,460.1
- Census division: Metro Vancouver
- Census subdivision: Surrey

Surrey-Fleetwood is a provincial electoral district in British Columbia, Canada, established by the Electoral Districts Act, 2008. It was first contested in the 2009 election. Surrey-Fleetwood is an amalgamation of most of Surrey-Tynehead along with portions of Surrey-Green Timbers, Surrey-Newton, and Surrey-Cloverdale.

== Members of the Legislative Assembly ==
On account of the re-alignment of electoral boundaries, most incumbents did not represent the entirety of their listed district during the preceding legislative term. Dave Hayer, British Columbia Liberal Party (BC Liberals) was initially elected during the 2001 election and 2005 election to the Surrey-Tynehead riding. Jagrup Brar of the New Democrats was elected in the 2009 election in this newly re-districted riding. Brar lost the seat to Peter Fassbender of the BC Liberals in the 2013 election, but won it back in the 2017 election.

This riding has elected the following members of the Legislative Assembly:

Assembly	Years	Member	Party
Surrey-Fleetwood; Riding created from Surrey-Cloverdale, Surrey-Green Timbers, Surrey-Newton and Surrey-Tynehead
39th	2009–2013	Jagrup Brar	New Democratic
40th	2013–2017	Peter Fassbender	Liberal
41st	2017–2020	Jagrup Brar	New Democratic
42nd	2020–2024	Jagrup Brar	New Democratic
43rd	2024–2026	Jagrup Brar	New Democratic
44th	2026–present	Garry Purewal	Conservative

== Election results ==
Graph of the election results in Surrey-Fleetwood (minor parties are combined into "Others")

2026 British Columbia general election
Party	Candidate	Votes	%	±%	Expenditures
Conservative	Garry Purewal	9,471	50.86	+5.94	
New Democratic	Jagrup Brar	7,086	38.05	−10.56	
Green	Tim Binnema	1,122	6.03	−0.44	
OneBC	Carolyn Hofbauer	530	2.85	–	
CentreBC	Paul Brar	413	2.22	–	
Total valid votes		18,622	100.00	–	
Total rejected ballots		39	0.21	+0.08	
Turnout		18,661			
Registered voters					
Conservative gain from New Democratic		Swing		+8.25	
Source: Elections BC

2024 British Columbia general election
Party	Candidate	Votes	%	±%	Expenditures
New Democratic	Jagrup Brar	9,923	48.61	−13.19	
Conservative	Avtar Gill	9,172	44.92	+44.42	
Green	Tim Binnema	1,321	6.47	−1.63	
Total valid votes		20,416	100.00	–	
Total rejected ballots		26	0.13		
Turnout		20,440	54.14		
Registered voters		37,753			
New Democratic notional hold		Swing		–28.81	
Source: Elections BC

2020 provincial election redistributed results
Party	%
New Democratic	61.8
Liberal	29.4
Green	8.1
Conservative	0.5

2020 British Columbia general election
Party	Candidate	Votes	%	±%	Expenditures
New Democratic	Jagrup Brar	11,457	60.93	+7.51	$61,844.02
Liberal	Garry Thind	5,776	30.72	−5.03	$62,863.75
Green	Dean McGee	1,571	8.35	−2.48	$702.09
Total valid votes		18,804	100.00	–	
Total rejected ballots		138	0.73	−0.04	
Turnout		18,942	50.77	−8.75	
Registered voters		37,309			
Source: Elections BC

2017 British Columbia general election
Party	Candidate	Votes	%	±%	Expenditures
New Democratic	Jagrup Brar	11,085	53.58	+9.17	$74,487
Liberal	Peter Fassbender	7,599	36.73	−8.70	$66,268
Green	Tim Binnema	2,004	9.69	+3.88	$879
Total valid votes		20,688	100.00	–	
Total rejected ballots		160	0.77	+0.10	
Turnout		20,848	59.52	+3.80	
Registered voters		35,025			
Source: Elections BC

2013 British Columbia general election
Party	Candidate	Votes	%	±%	Expenditures
Liberal	Peter Fassbender	8,974	45.43	+5.89	$191,875
New Democratic	Jagrup Brar	8,774	44.41	−4.88	$74,514
Green	Tim Binnema	1,147	5.81	−0.62	$1,641
Conservative	Murali Krishnan	801	4.05	−0.66	$1,275
Vision	Arvin Kumar	59	0.30	–	$2,195
Total valid votes		19,755	100.00	–	
Total rejected ballots		134	0.67	−0.33	
Turnout		19,889	55.72	+1.76	
Registered voters		35,692			
Source: Elections BC

2009 British Columbia general election
Party	Candidate	Votes	%	Expenditures
New Democratic	Jagrup Brar	8,852	49.59	$81,623
Liberal	Jagmohan Singh	6,860	39.54	$133,845
Green	Christin Geall	1,120	6.46	$350
Conservative	Chamkaur Sandhu	818	4.71	
Total valid votes		17,650	100.00	
Total rejected ballots		178	1.00	
Turnout		17,828	53.96	

== See also ==
- List of British Columbia provincial electoral districts
- Canadian provincial electoral districts
