= Gurbux Saini =

Canadian politician (born 1951)

Gurbux Saini MP

Member of Parliament for Fleetwood—Port Kells
- Incumbent
- Assumed office April 28, 2025
- Preceded by: Ken Hardie

Personal details
- Born: 1951 (age 74–75) Bhungarni, Hoshiarpur, Punjab, India
- Party: Liberal
- Website: gurbuxsaini.liberal.ca

Gurbux Saini MP is a Canadian politician from the Liberal Party of Canada. He was elected Member of Parliament for Fleetwood—Port Kells in the 2025 Canadian federal election.

== Biography ==
Saini was awarded a Queen’s Platinum Jubilee award.

== Personal life ==
Saini is of Indian heritage. He migrated to Canada in 1970 from Punjab.

== Electoral record ==
2025 Canadian federal election: Fleetwood—Port Kells
** Preliminary results — Not yet official **
Party	Candidate	Votes	%	±%	Expenditures
Liberal	Gurbux Saini	23,239	47.89	+1.96	
Conservative	Sukh Pandher	21,439	44.18	+15.65	
New Democratic	Shannon Permal	2,885	5.95	–14.39	
People's	John Hetherington	499	1.03	–1.86	
Green	Murali Krishnan	460	0.95	–0.97	
Total valid votes/expense limit					
Total rejected ballots					
Turnout		48,522	63.65		
Eligible voters		76,235			
Liberal notional hold		Swing		–6.85	
Source: Elections Canada
