= Peter Fassbender =

Canadian politician (born 1946)

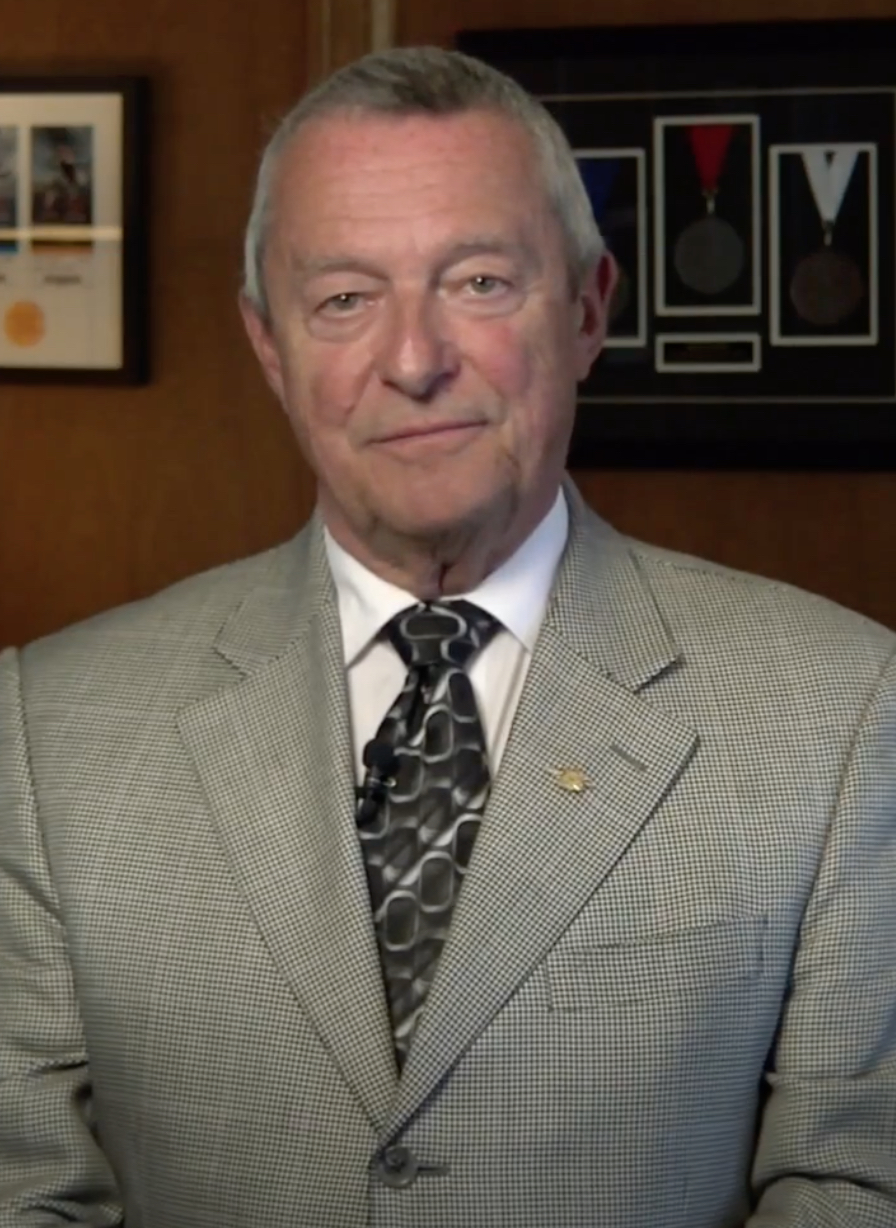
- Fassbender in 2016

Member of the British Columbia Legislative Assembly for Surrey-Fleetwood
- In office May 14, 2013 – May 9, 2017
- Preceded by: Jagrup Brar
- Succeeded by: Jagrup Brar

Minister of Community, Sport and Cultural Development of British Columbia
- In office July 30, 2015 – June 12, 2017
- Premier: Christy Clark
- Preceded by: Coralee Oakes
- Succeeded by: Sam Sullivan

Minister of Education of British Columbia
- In office June 7, 2013 – July 30, 2015
- Premier: Christy Clark
- Preceded by: Don McRae
- Succeeded by: Mike Bernier

Mayor of the City of Langley
- In office December 5, 2005 – June 17, 2013
- Preceded by: Marlene Grinnell
- Succeeded by: Ted Schaffer

Langley City Councillor
- In office December 9, 2002 – December 5, 2005

Personal details
- Born: December 20, 1946 (age 79) Germany
- Party: BC Liberal
- Spouse: Charlene
- Children: 2
- Profession: Politician

Peter Fassbender (born 1946) is a Canadian politician, who was elected to the Legislative Assembly of British Columbia in the 2013 provincial election after a career at the municipal level. He was elected to represent the electoral district of Surrey-Fleetwood as a member of the British Columbia Liberal Party. He was appointed by Premier Christy Clark as Minister of Education in June 2013, then Minister of Community, Sport and Cultural Development & Minister Responsible for TransLink in July 2015.

== Early profession ==
Fassbender was born in Germany and emigrated to Canada with his parents in 1952. Since then, he has lived his whole life in Surrey, Aldergrove or Langley. He graduated from Queen Elizabeth High School in Surrey and attended the National Broadcasting School in Vancouver. He got a film librarian job at CHAN Television (now Global) and moved up the ranks to cameraman, and then producer and director. He worked for the advertising agency James Lovick in the early 1970s and eventually became a partner of Frank Palmer at the national firm DDB Canada (formerly Palmer Jarvis). A major focus of his private sector career focused on social marketing campaigns including smoking cessation projects for Health Canada and international marketing activities for Industry Canada. In 1996 and 1997 he was reported to have done volunteer public relations work for the evangelical men's organization Promise Keepers. He is a distant cousin of actor Michael Fassbender.

== Politics ==
After a failed run at a Social Credit nomination, Fassbender served a four-year term (1975 to 1979) during some turbulent years on the Langley school board. During that time, the board pursued a 'back-to-basics' approach that considered the restoration of corporal punishment and banning the novel Go Ask Alice. Fassbender says his approach to education has changed since the 1970s.

Fassbender was elected for the first time to the city council of Langley in 2002, and then as mayor in the 2005, 2008 and 2011 civic elections. He advocated for the growing communities south of the Fraser River as co-chair of the municipal advisory council for Fraser Health and as vice-chair of TransLink's Mayors' Council.

In November 2012, the provincial government appointed Fassbender as chair of the board for the BC Pavilion Corporation, which operates BC Place Stadium and the Vancouver Convention Centre. In addition to dealing with major renovations, the position also dealt with transparency criticism from journalist Bob Mackin. In the 2013 provincial election, he defeated three-term NDP MLA Jagrup Brar and took leave from his mayoral position.

As Minister of Education, one of his priorities was to seek a 10-year labour agreement with the British Columbia Teachers' Federation.

In addition to his ministerial duties, Fassbender sat on the Cabinet Committee on Secure Tomorrow.

In the 2017 provincial election, he lost his re-election as MLA to Jagrup Brar.

In 2018, he ran for his former position as mayor of the City of Langley. He was narrowly defeated, losing to Val van den Broek by around 200 votes.

== Electoral record ==
2017 British Columbia general election: Surrey-Fleetwood
Party	Candidate	Votes	%	±%	Expenditures
New Democratic	Jagrup Brar	11,085	53.58	+9.17	$74,487
Liberal	Peter Fassbender	7,599	36.73	−8.70	$66,268
Green	Tim Binnema	2,004	9.69	+3.88	$879
Total valid votes		20,688	100.00	–	
Total rejected ballots		160	0.77	+0.10	
Turnout		20,848	59.52	+3.80	
Registered voters		35,025			
Source: Elections BC

2013 British Columbia general election: Surrey-Fleetwood
Party	Candidate	Votes	%	±%	Expenditures
Liberal	Peter Fassbender	8,974	45.43	+5.89	$191,875
New Democratic	Jagrup Brar	8,774	44.41	−4.88	$74,514
Green	Tim Binnema	1,147	5.81	−0.62	$1,641
Conservative	Murali Krishnan	801	4.05	−0.66	$1,275
Vision	Arvin Kumar	59	0.30	–	$2,195
Total valid votes		19,755	100.00	–	
Total rejected ballots		134	0.67	−0.33	
Turnout		19,889	55.72	+1.76	
Registered voters		35,692			
Source: Elections BC
