= Ken Hardie =

Canadian politician and broadcaster

Member of Parliament for Fleetwood—Port Kells
- In office October 19, 2015 – March 23, 2025
- Preceded by: Nina Grewal
- Succeeded by: Gurbux Saini

Personal details
- Born: 1947 (age 78–79) Edmonton, Alberta, Canada
- Party: Liberal
- Education: University of British Columbia; Simon Fraser University
- Profession: Broadcaster, public relations spokesperson

Ken C. Hardie (born 1947) is a Canadian politician and former broadcaster who served as a member of Parliament in the House of Commons of Canada representing the riding of Fleetwood—Port Kells from 2015 federal election until 2025.

Hardie is a broadcaster and former spokesperson for TransLink and the Insurance Corporation of British Columbia. He attended the University of British Columbia and Simon Fraser University.

In October 2023, Hardie made a comment on X, comparing the Conservative Party of Canada to Nazi Minister of Propaganda, Joseph Goebbels. Hardie later deleted his tweet, and was asked to apologize for his tweet by House Speaker Greg Fergus.

== Electoral record ==
2019 Canadian federal election: Fleetwood—Port Kells
Party	Candidate	Votes	%	±%	Expenditures
Liberal	Ken Hardie	18,401	37.63	–9.28	$73,078.01
Conservative	Shinder Purewal	16,518	33.78	+4.50	$58,665.16
New Democratic	Annie Ohana	10,533	21.54	+0.08	$12,292.12
Green	Tanya Baertl	2,360	4.83	+2.46	$1,922.74
People's	Mike Poulin	1,093	2.23	–	$7,705.33
Total valid votes/expense limit		48,905	99.32	–	$107,604.80
Total rejected ballots		336	0.68	+0.13	
Turnout		49,241	60.64	–4.60	
Eligible voters		81,198			
Liberal hold		Swing		–6.89	
Source: Elections Canada

2015 Canadian federal election: Fleetwood—Port Kells
Party	Candidate	Votes	%	±%	Expenditures
Liberal	Ken Hardie	22,871	46.90	+31.24	$50,601.97
Conservative	Nina Grewal	14,275	29.27	–18.56	$67,464.21
New Democratic	Garry Begg	10,463	21.46	–11.60	$97,936.69
Green	Richard Hosein	1,154	2.37	–0.20	$3,625.85
Total valid votes/expense limit		48,763	99.45	–	$206,797.64
Total rejected ballots		269	0.55	+0.02	
Turnout		49,032	65.25	+12.39	
Eligible voters		75,150			
Liberal gain from Conservative		Swing		+24.90	
Source: Elections Canada
