= Garry Purewal =

Canadian politician

Garry Purewal MLA

Member of the British Columbia Legislative Assembly for Surrey-Fleetwood
- Incumbent
- Assumed office October 24, 2026
- Preceded by: Jagrup Brar

Personal details
- Party: Conservative
- Website: website

Garry Purewal MLA is a Canadian politician who is the Member of the British Columbia Legislative Assembly for Surrey-Fleetwood since the 2026 British Columbia general election.

Purewal is a former military police officer with the Canadian Armed Forces.

== Electoral record ==
2026 British Columbia general election: Surrey-Fleetwood
Party	Candidate	Votes	%	±%	Expenditures
Conservative	Garry Purewal	9,471	50.86	+5.94	
New Democratic	Jagrup Brar	7,086	38.05	−10.56	
Green	Tim Binnema	1,122	6.03	−0.44	
OneBC	Carolyn Hofbauer	530	2.85	–	
CentreBC	Paul Brar	413	2.22	–	
Total valid votes		18,622	100.00	–	
Total rejected ballots		39	0.21	+0.08	
Turnout		18,661			
Registered voters					
Conservative gain from New Democratic		Swing		+8.25	
Source: Elections BC
