= Surrey-Panorama Ridge =

Defunct provincial electoral district in British Columbia, Canada

British Columbia electoral district

Defunct provincial electoral district
- Legislature: Legislative Assembly of British Columbia
- District created: 1999
- District abolished: 2009
- First contested: 2001
- Last contested: 2005

Demographics
- Census division(s): Metro Vancouver
- Census subdivision(s): Surrey

Surrey-Panorama Ridge was a provincial electoral district for the Legislative Assembly of British Columbia, Canada, from 2001 to 2009. The district was created in the 1999 redistribution from the southern half of Surrey-Newton, and the western portion of Surrey-Cloverdale. It was abolished following the 2008 redistribution, with a large portion going to the new Surrey-Panorama riding.

== Demographics ==
Population, 2017	89, 985
Population Change, 1996–2017	71.2%
Area (km^{2})	28.16
Pop. Density (people per km^{2})	2,892

== Members of the Legislative Assembly ==
This riding has elected the following members of the Legislative Assembly:

Surrey-Panorama Ridge
Assembly	Years	Member	Party
Riding created from Surrey-Newton and Surrey-Cloverdale
37th	2001–2004	Gulzar Cheema	Liberal
37th	2004–2005	Jagrup Brar	New Democratic
38th	2005–2009	Jagrup Brar	New Democratic
Riding abolished

== Election results ==
B.C. General Election 2005: Surrey-Panorama Ridge
Party	Candidate	Votes	%	±%
NDP	Jagrup Brar	11,553	53.17	-0.42
Liberal	Bob Hans	8,573	39.45	+6.10
Green	Romeo D. De La Pena	1,370	6.30	-2.07
Marijuana	Troy Allan Chan	234	1.08	–
Total		21,730	100.00	

Surrey-Panorama Ridge by-election, 28 October 2004
Party	Candidate	Votes	%	±%
NDP	Jagrup Brar	6,740	53.59	+33.68
Liberal	Mary Polak	4,194	33.35	-25.59
Green	Adriane Carr	1,053	8.37	-0.46
Conservative	David James Evans	276	2.19	–
Reform	Shirley Abraham	246	1.96	-0.55
Independent	Joe Pal	68	0.54	–
Total Valid Votes		12,577	100.00	
Total Rejected Ballots		41	0.33	
Turnout		12,618	52.15	

B.C. General Election 2001: Surrey-Panorama Ridge
Party	Candidate	Votes	%	±%
Liberal	Gulzar Cheema	9,590	58.94	–
NDP	Bruce Ralston	3,240	19.91	–
Green	Sunny Athwal	1,437	8.83	–
Unity	Heather Stilwell	1,123	6.90	–
Marijuana	Randy Caine	424	2.61	–
Reform	Shirley Ann Abraham	408	2.51	–
Action	Ed Weiland	50	0.30	–
Total Valid Votes		16,272	100.00	
Total Rejected Ballots		128	0.79	
Turnout		16,400	69.04	

== See also ==
- List of British Columbia provincial electoral districts
- Canadian provincial electoral districts
