= Jinny Sims =

Canadian politician

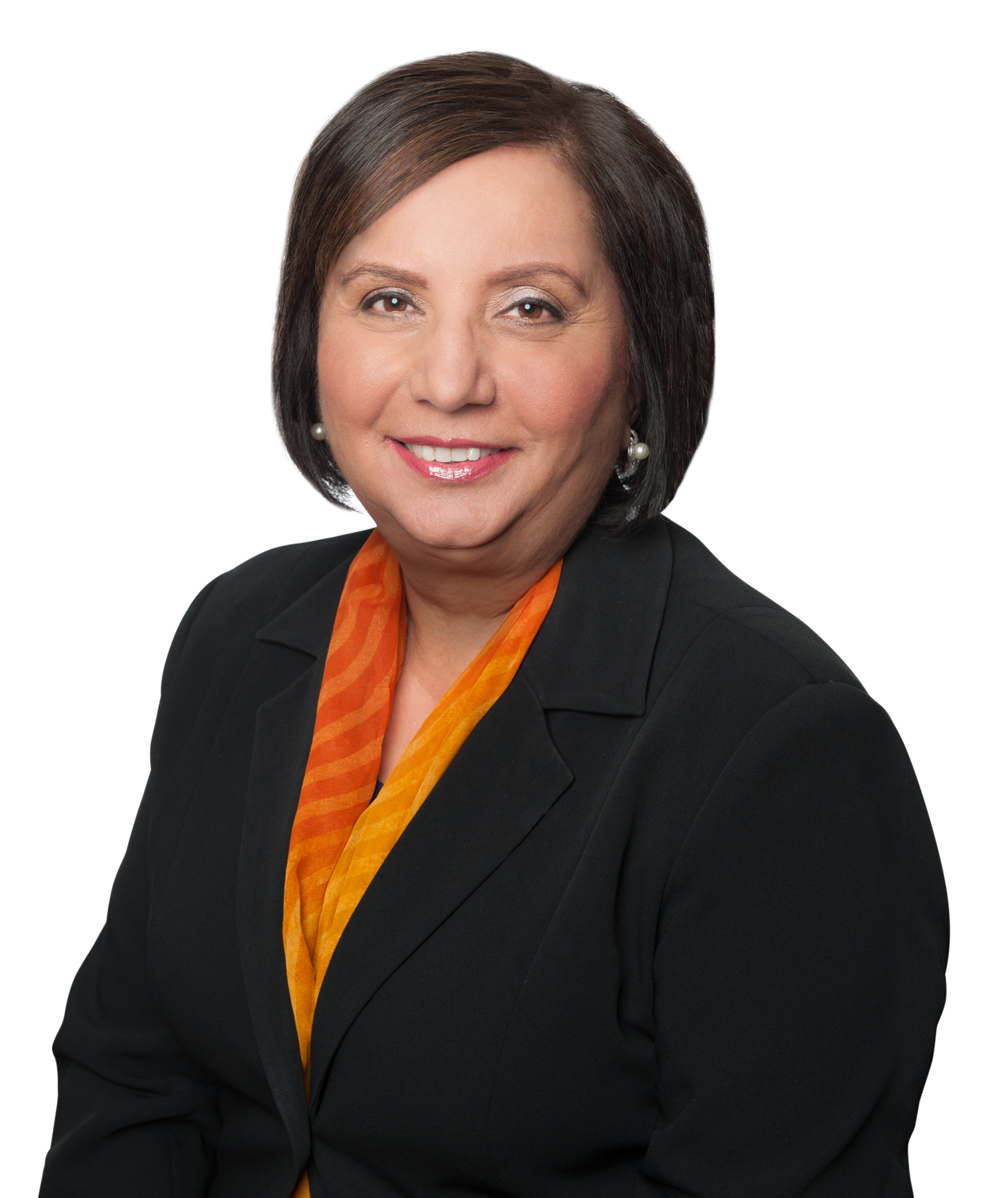

Minister for Citizens' Services of British Columbia
- In office July 18, 2017 – October 4, 2019
- Premier: John Horgan
- Preceded by: Jas Johal (As Minister of Technology, Innovation and Citizens' Services)
- Succeeded by: Selina Robinson

Critic for Employment
- In office August 13, 2013 – November 19, 2015
- Leader: Thomas Mulcair
- Preceded by: Chris Charlton
- Succeeded by: Karen Vecchio

Critic for Immigration
- In office April 19, 2012 – August 13, 2013
- Leader: Thomas Mulcair
- Preceded by: Don Davies
- Succeeded by: Lysane Blanchette-Lamothe

Critic for International Cooperation
- In office October 3, 2011 – April 18, 2012
- Leader: Nycole Turmel
- Preceded by: Hélène Laverdière
- Succeeded by: Romeo Saganash

Member of the British Columbia Legislative Assembly for Surrey-Panorama
- In office May 9, 2017 – September 21, 2024
- Preceded by: Marvin Hunt
- Succeeded by: Bryan Tepper

Member of Parliament for Newton—North Delta
- In office May 30, 2011 – August 4, 2015
- Preceded by: Sukh Dhaliwal
- Succeeded by: Sukh Dhaliwal (Surrey—Newton)

Personal details
- Born: June 7, 1952 (age 74) Jalandhar, Punjab, India
- Party: New Democratic Party; Surrey Forward
- Spouse: Stephen Sims
- Education: University of Manchester
- Profession: Teacher, union leader

Jinny Jogindera Sims (born June 7, 1952) is a Canadian politician, who was elected as a New Democratic Party Member of the Legislative Assembly of British Columbia in the 2017 provincial election in Surrey-Panorama and represented the riding until 2024. She previously was elected to the House of Commons of Canada in the 2011 election. She represented the electoral district of Newton—North Delta as a member of the New Democratic Party. Sims was also a candidate for Mayor of Surrey in the October 2022 civic elections. She placed fourth with 12.58% of the vote.

In the 2024 British Columbia general election, she was unseated by Bryan Tepper from the BC Conservative Party.

== Early life ==
Born to a Sikh family, Sims emigrated to England from Punjab, India, at the age of nine. She earned a Bachelor of Education degree at the Victoria University of Manchester (now the University of Manchester). Sims and her husband moved to Canada in 1975, spending two years in Quebec before moving to Nanaimo where she was a high school teacher until the early 2000s.

== BCTF president ==
She was elected president of the BC Teachers' Federation in 2004 and served in that role until 2007. In her role as president of the BCTF, she was involved in the May 2005 provincial election when the BC Liberal Party, a week before the election, accused the BCTF of having a "secret plan" to strike two days after the election; the organization subsequently filed a defamation lawsuit. When the teachers, who had been working for over a year without a contract, did provide strike notice in September 2005, the provincial government immediately extended, by legislation, the last contract to June 2006 and made a potential strike illegal. Regardless, Sims led the teachers in job action, culminating in a two-week strike. The Labour Relations Board determined the strike illegal and the BC Supreme Court found the BCTF in civil contempt of court, fined the BCTF $500,000 and ordered the BCTF to not pay the teachers a strike pay. The strike ended when the membership voted to accept a $150-million mediated settlement which both the government and the BCTF executive had endorsed. Sims's BCTF successfully negotiated a five-year contract in June 2006.

== Accusations ==
In October 2019, allegations of misconduct were made against Sims, resulting in her resignation as Minister of Citizens Services. A special prosecutor, Richard Peck, was appointed to investigate the charges. Sims was accused of writing support letters for travel visas and of telling her staff to bypass freedom of information laws by using personal email and WhatsApp rather than official email addresses. In April 2020, the special prosecutor reported that he and the RCMP had found no evidence to support the charges against her and had cleared her of any wrongdoing.

== Electoral record ==
=== Provincial elections ===
2026 British Columbia general election: Surrey-Panorama
The 2026 general election will be held on October 24.
Party	Candidate	Votes	%	±%	Expenditures
New Democratic	Jinny Sims				
Conservative	Bryan Tepper				
CentreBC	Manav Manro				
Green	Nolen Scott				
Total valid votes					
Total rejected ballots					
Turnout					
Registered voters					
Source: Elections BC

2024 British Columbia general election: Surrey-Panorama
Party	Candidate	Votes	%	±%	Expenditures
Conservative	Bryan Tepper	8,735	49.6%		
New Democratic	Jinny Sims	8,472	48.1%	-6.97	
Freedom	Paramjit Rai	404	2.3%		
Total valid votes		17,611	–		
Total rejected ballots					
Turnout					
Registered voters					
Source: Elections BC

2020 British Columbia general election: Surrey-Panorama
Party	Candidate	Votes	%	±%	Expenditures
New Democratic	Jinny Sims	12,336	55.07	+4.22	$60,769.34
Liberal	Gulzar Cheema	9,607	42.89	+1.03	$65,963.02
Vision	Sophie Shrestha	458	2.04	–	$0.00
Total valid votes		22,401	100.00	–	
Total rejected ballots		240	1.06	+0.27	
Turnout		22,641	51.65	−9.39	
Registered voters		43,835			
New Democratic hold		Swing		+1.60	
Source: Elections BC

2017 British Columbia general election: Surrey-Panorama
Party	Candidate	Votes	%	±%	Expenditures
New Democratic	Jinny Sims	12,227	50.85	+15.11	$64,840
Liberal	Puneet Sandhar	10,064	41.86	−12.43	$66,078
Green	Veronica Laurel Greer	1,620	6.74	+1.06	$0
Refederation	Liz Galenzoski	132	0.55	–	$250
Total valid votes		24,043	100.00	–	
Total rejected ballots		192	0.79	+0.14	
Turnout		24,235	61.04	+3.32	
Registered voters		39,701			
Source: Elections BC

=== Federal elections ===
2015 Canadian federal election: Surrey—Newton
Party	Candidate	Votes	%	±%	Expenditures
Liberal	Sukh Dhaliwal	24,869	55.98	+21.90	$165,127.94
New Democratic	Jinny Sims	11,602	26.12	–9.17	$121,583.62
Conservative	Harpreet Singh	6,978	15.71	–11.71	$89,371.95
Green	Pamela Sangha	975	2.19	–0.40	none listed
Total valid votes/expense limit		44,424	99.27	–	$199,113.86
Total rejected ballots		328	0.73	–	
Turnout		44,752	67.85	–	
Eligible voters		65,954			
Liberal notional gain from New Democratic		Swing		+15.54	
Source: Elections Canada

2011 Canadian federal election: Newton—North Delta
Party	Candidate	Votes	%	±%	Expenditures
New Democratic	Jinny Sims	15,413	33.42	+7.29	$77,719.25
Liberal	Sukh Dhaliwal	14,510	31.46	–4.96	$74,338.64
Conservative	Mani Fallon	14,437	31.30	+0.39	$75,595.27
Green	Liz Walker	1,520	3.30	–2.30	none listed
Independent	Ravi S. Gill	123	0.27	–	$5,095.65
Communist	Samuel Frank Hammond	116	0.25	–0.02	$306.07
Total valid votes/expense limit		46,119	99.37	–	$85,439.40
Total rejected ballots		294	0.63	+0.07	
Turnout		46,413	61.45	–0.62	
Eligible voters		75,535			
New Democratic gain from Liberal		Swing		+5.79	
Source: Elections Canada

British Columbia provincial government of John Horgan
Cabinet post (1)
Predecessor	Office	Successor
Jas Johal	Minister of Citizens' Services; July 18, 2017 – October 4, 2019	Selina Robinson
