= Fleetwood—Port Kells =

Federal electoral district in British Columbia, Canada

Coordinates: 49.169°N 122.771°W

British Columbia electoral district
- Interactive map of riding boundaries from the 2025 federal election

Federal electoral district
- Legislature: House of Commons
MP
Gurbux Saini
Liberal
- District created: 2003
- First contested: 2004
- Last contested: 2025
- District webpage: profile, map

Demographics
- Population (2011): 109,742
- Electors (2019): 80,593
- Area (km²): 74
- Pop. density (per km²): 1,483
- Census subdivision: Surrey (part)

Fleetwood—Port Kells is a federal electoral district in the province of British Columbia, Canada, that has been represented in the House of Commons of Canada since 2004.

== Geography ==
It consists of the northeast part of the City of Surrey, Barnston Island, and Barnston Island Indian Reserve No. 3 the Greater Vancouver Regional District. The communities of Fleetwood, East Newton, Guildford, Port Kells and North Clayton are contained within this riding.

Fraser Heights was included in this riding until it was moved to the new Langley Township—Fraser Heights riding in the 2023 redistribution.

== Demographics ==
Panethnic groups in Fleetwood—Port Kells (2011−2021)
Panethnic group	2021		2016		2011	
Panethnic group	Pop.	%	Pop.	%	Pop.	%
South Asian	42,855	34.56%	34,870	30.1%	29,615	27.14%
European (Note: Statistic includes all persons that did not make up part of a visible minority or an indigenous identity.)	27,620	22.28%	34,295	29.61%	39,545	36.24%
East Asian (Note: Statistic includes total responses of "Chinese", "Korean", and "Japanese" under visible minority section on census.)	22,275	17.97%	20,435	17.64%	17,475	16.01%
Southeast Asian (Note: Statistic includes total responses of "Filipino" and "Southeast Asian" under visible minority section on census.)	18,560	14.97%	16,205	13.99%	15,115	13.85%
Middle Eastern (Note: Statistic includes total responses of "West Asian" and "Arab" under visible minority section on census.)	2,640	2.13%	2,435	2.1%	1,480	1.36%
African	2,425	1.96%	1,900	1.64%	1,435	1.32%
Indigenous	1,970	1.59%	2,145	1.85%	1,635	1.5%
Latin American	1,805	1.46%	1,300	1.12%	1,155	1.06%
Other (Note: Statistic includes total responses of "Visible minority, n.i.e." and "Multiple visible minorities" under visible minority section on census.)	3,845	3.1%	2,240	1.93%	1,680	1.54%
Total responses	123,990	99.2%	115,835	99.04%	109,125	99.44%
Total population	124,987	100%	116,958	100%	109,742	100%
Notes: Totals greater than 100% due to multiple origin responses. Demographics based on 2012 Canadian federal electoral redistribution riding boundaries.

According to the 2011 Canadian census

Languages: 46.9% English, 17.6% Punjabi, 8.8% Chinese, 4.9% Tagalog, 4.0% Korean, 2.8% Vietnamese, 2.3% Hindi, 1.1% Spanish, 11.6% Other
Religions: 43.0% Christian, 19.6% Sikh, 3.7% Muslim, 3.6% Buddhist, 3.3% Hindu, 0.4% Other, 26.4% None
Median income: $26,124 (2010)
Average income: $34,327 (2010)

== History ==
The electoral district was created in 2003 from Surrey Central and some of Surrey North riding.

The 2012 federal electoral boundaries redistribution concluded that the electoral boundaries of Fleetwood—Port Kells should be adjusted, and a modified electoral district of the same name will be contested in future elections. The redefined Fleetwood—Port Kells gains very small areas from the current ridings of Surrey North and South Surrey—White Rock—Cloverdale while losing significant portions of its current territory to the new districts of Cloverdale—Langley City, South Surrey—White Rock and Surrey—Newton. These new boundaries were legally defined in the 2013 representation order, which came into effect upon the call of the 42nd Canadian federal election, scheduled for October 2015.

== Members of Parliament ==
Parliament	Years	Member	Party
Fleetwood—Port Kells; Riding created from Surrey Central and Surrey North
38th	2004–2006	Nina Grewal	Conservative
39th	2006–2008	Nina Grewal	Conservative
40th	2008–2011	Nina Grewal	Conservative
41st	2011–2015	Nina Grewal	Conservative
42nd	2015–2019	Ken Hardie	Liberal
43rd	2019–2021	Ken Hardie	Liberal
44th	2021–2025	Ken Hardie	Liberal
45th	2025–present	Gurbux Saini	Liberal

== Election results ==
View source data.
Graph of election results in Fleetwood—Port Kells (minor parties that never got 2% of the vote or didn't run consistently are omitted)

2025 Canadian federal election
Party	Candidate	Votes	%	±%	Expenditures
Liberal	Gurbux Saini	23,250	47.91	+1.98	$98,494.32
Conservative	Sukh Pandher	21,439	44.17	+15.64	$115,779.78
New Democratic	Shannon Permal	2,885	5.94	–14.40	$1,539.18
People's	John Hetherington	499	1.03	–1.86	$176.28
Green	Murali Krishnan	460	0.95	–0.97	none listed
Total valid votes/expense limit		48,533	99.17	–	$125,949.43
Total rejected ballots		404	0.83	–0.05	
Turnout		48,937	63.72	+4.96	
Eligible voters		76,806			
Liberal notional hold		Swing		+6.83	
Source: Elections Canada

2021 federal election redistributed results
Party	Vote	%
Liberal	19,547	45.93
Conservative	12,140	28.53
New Democratic	8,655	20.34
People's	1,232	2.89
Green	817	1.92
Others	166	0.39

2021 Canadian federal election
Party	Candidate	Votes	%	±%	Expenditures
Liberal	Ken Hardie	21,350	45.25	+7.62	$85,743.60
Conservative	Dave Hayer	14,553	30.84	–2.93	$81,884.68
New Democratic	Raji Toor	8,960	18.99	–2.55	$15,353.01
People's	Amrit Birring	1,284	2.72	+0.49	$1,464.05
Green	Perry DeNure	892	1.89	–2.94	none listed
Independent	Murali Krishnan	146	0.31	–	none listed
Total valid votes/expense limit		47,185	99.12	–	$111,096.66
Total rejected ballots		417	0.88	+0.19	
Turnout		47,602	58.75	–1.89	
Eligible voters		81,024			
Liberal hold		Swing		+5.28	
Source: Elections Canada

2019 Canadian federal election
Party	Candidate	Votes	%	±%	Expenditures
Liberal	Ken Hardie	18,401	37.63	–9.28	$73,078.01
Conservative	Shinder Purewal	16,518	33.78	+4.50	$58,665.16
New Democratic	Annie Ohana	10,533	21.54	+0.08	$12,292.12
Green	Tanya Baertl	2,360	4.83	+2.46	$1,922.74
People's	Mike Poulin	1,093	2.23	–	$7,705.33
Total valid votes/expense limit		48,905	99.32	–	$107,604.80
Total rejected ballots		336	0.68	+0.13	
Turnout		49,241	60.64	–4.60	
Eligible voters		81,198			
Liberal hold		Swing		–6.89	
Source: Elections Canada

2015 Canadian federal election
Party	Candidate	Votes	%	±%	Expenditures
Liberal	Ken Hardie	22,871	46.90	+31.24	$50,601.97
Conservative	Nina Grewal	14,275	29.27	–18.56	$67,464.21
New Democratic	Garry Begg	10,463	21.46	–11.60	$97,936.69
Green	Richard Hosein	1,154	2.37	–0.20	$3,625.85
Total valid votes/expense limit		48,763	99.45	–	$206,797.64
Total rejected ballots		269	0.55	+0.02	
Turnout		49,032	65.25	+12.39	
Eligible voters		75,150			
Liberal gain from Conservative		Swing		+24.90	
Source: Elections Canada

2011 federal election redistributed results
Party	Vote	%
Conservative	16,541	47.83
New Democratic	11,433	33.06
Liberal	5,416	15.66
Green	886	2.56
Others	306	0.88

2011 Canadian federal election
Party	Candidate	Votes	%	±%	Expenditures
Conservative	Nina Grewal	23,950	47.55	+2.85	$86,481.51
New Democratic	Nao Fernando	16,533	32.82	+10.01	$38,076.49
Liberal	Pam Dhanoa	8,041	15.96	–10.16	$75,433.15
Green	Alan Saldanha	1,476	2.93	–3.43	none listed
Libertarian	Alex Joehl	370	0.73	–	$716.90
Total valid votes/expense limit		50,370	99.47	–	$97,178.36
Total rejected ballots		266	0.53	+0.07	
Turnout		50,636	52.86	–2.71	
Eligible voters		95,797			
Conservative hold		Swing		–	
Alan Saldanha withdrew after a controversial quote on Facebook.
Source: Elections Canada

2008 Canadian federal election
Party	Candidate	Votes	%	±%	Expenditures
Conservative	Nina Grewal	21,389	44.70	+11.22	$76,256.63
Liberal	Brenda Locke	12,502	26.13	–5.45	$64,457.86
New Democratic	Nao Fernando	10,916	22.81	–2.36	$59,346.68
Green	Brian Newbold	3,045	6.36	+3.93	$250.00
Total valid votes/expense limit		47,852	99.54	–	$88,578.77
Total rejected ballots		219	0.46	+0.16	
Turnout		48,071	55.57	–3.87	
Eligible voters		86,503			
Conservative hold		Swing		–	
Source: Elections Canada

2006 Canadian federal election
Party	Candidate	Votes	%	±%	Expenditures
Conservative	Nina Grewal	14,577	33.47	–2.33	$72,197.70
Liberal	Brenda Locke	13,749	31.57	+2.10	$52,052.57
New Democratic	Barry Bell	10,961	25.17	–2.80	$18,396.32
Independent	Jack Cook	3,202	7.35	–	$75,818.07
Green	Duncan McDonald	1,059	2.43	–3.90	none listed
Total valid votes/expense limit		43,548	99.71	–	$76,227.74
Total rejected ballots		127	0.29	–0.26	
Turnout		43,675	59.44	+0.38	
Eligible voters		73,477			
Conservative hold		Swing		–2.22	
Source: Elections Canada

2004 Canadian federal election
Party	Candidate	Votes	%	±%	Expenditures
Conservative	Nina Grewal	14,052	35.80	–	$67,118.70
Liberal	Gulzar Singh Cheema	11,568	29.47	–	$65,800.02
New Democratic	Barry Bell	10,976	27.97	–	$7,348.84
Green	David Walters	2,484	6.33	–	none listed
Marxist–Leninist	Joseph Theriault	167	0.43	–	none listed
Total valid votes/expense limit		39,247	99.45	–	$72,408.06
Total rejected ballots		218	0.55	–	
Turnout		39,465	59.06	–	
Eligible voters		66,821			
Source: Elections Canada

== See also ==
- List of Canadian electoral districts
- Historical federal electoral districts of Canada
