= Nina Grewal =

Canadian politician (born 1958)

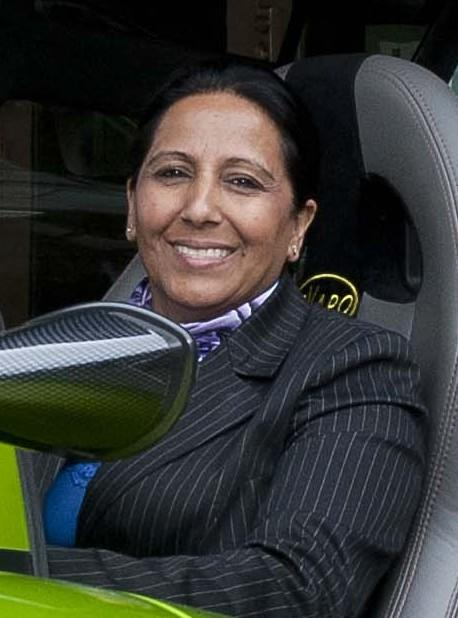

Member of Parliament for Fleetwood—Port Kells
- In office 28 June 2004 – 4 August 2015
- Preceded by: New Riding
- Succeeded by: Ken Hardie

Personal details
- Born: 20 October 1958 (age 67) Osaka, Japan
- Party: Conservative
- Spouse: Gurmant Grewal
- Profession: Businesswoman, sales manager

Nina Grewal (born 20 October 1958), is a Canadian politician of the Conservative Party. She represented the constituency of Fleetwood—Port Kells, British Columbia from her election in the 2004 federal election to her defeat in the 2015 federal election by Liberal candidate Ken Hardie.

== Biography ==
Grewal was born in Osaka, Japan in 1958. She and her husband lived in Liberia before emigrating to Canada, where she raised her young family while working as a sales manager selling Registered Education Savings Plans. Grewal became an active member of the community and the Reform Party of Canada (subsequently the Canadian Alliance and Conservative Party of Canada), participating in many national and regional conferences and conventions. She is married to former Member of Parliament Gurmant Grewal, and the Grewals were the first married couple in Canadian history to concurrently serve as federal MPs.

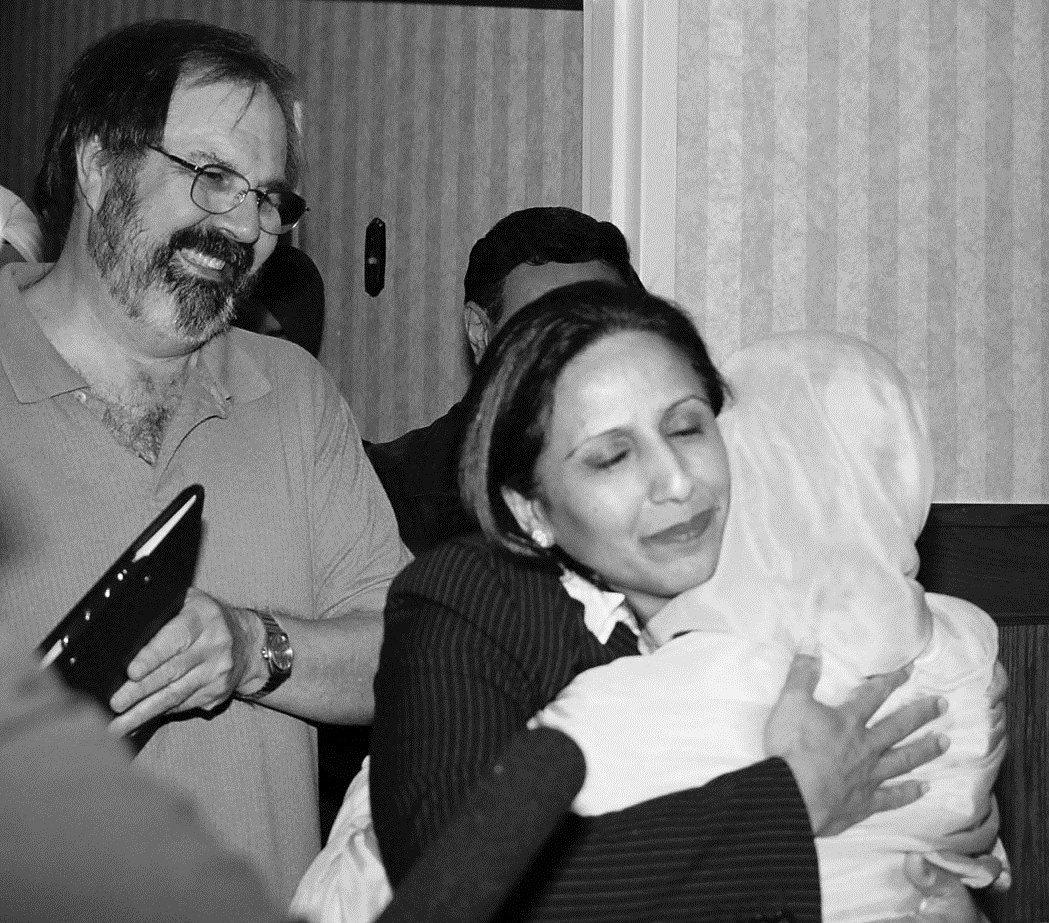
Canadian MP Nina Grewal hugs a supporter after her victory in the 2006 Canadian federal elections

Grewal is a member of the House of Commons Standing Committee on Foreign Affairs and the Sub-Committee on International Human Rights, and she has served on the Immigration, Canadian Heritage, and Status of Women committees.

During her first term, she introduced a private members motion seeking to raise the age of consent. While the then-Liberal government defeated the measure, the subsequent Conservative government put it into law. She also proposed measures to tackle identity theft (with Bill C-271) and to amend the State Immunity Act (Bill C-346), both of which were incorporated into government legislation and subsequently passed. In addition, she pursued bills against child pornography (Bill C-347) and regulations for the volume of television commercials (Bill C-621). The Canadian Radio-television and Telecommunications Commission later decided to implement her proposals entirely.

From 15–18 May 2005, Grewal's husband surreptitiously taped his discussions with the Liberal Party which, he claimed, showed Liberal government officials enticing him to crossing the floor in exchange for patronage positions. The Liberals were concerned with saving the government during the vote of confidence, and had also contacted MPs Chuck Cadman, Inky Mark, and Belinda Stronach (the last of whom did cross the floor, and was made a minister). When the audio tapes were released, Nina Grewal publicly refused to comment about these discussions; the Liberals were cleared of any wrongdoing, and the Grewals had to explain in detail to the Parliamentary Ethics Commissioner about the discussions and secret tapings on 16 May.

On 29 November 2006, it was announced that Nina Grewal would be standing for re-election, even though her husband was not. She successfully defended her seat in the 2006, 2008, and 2011 federal elections, but lost in the 2015 election.

Grewal announced her support for Motion 312, a motion that would have Canada reexamine their definition of when human life begins.

== Electoral record ==
2015 Canadian federal election: Fleetwood—Port Kells
Party	Candidate	Votes	%	±%	Expenditures
Liberal	Ken Hardie	22,871	46.90	+31.24	$50,601.97
Conservative	Nina Grewal	14,275	29.27	–18.56	$67,464.21
New Democratic	Garry Begg	10,463	21.46	–11.60	$97,936.69
Green	Richard Hosein	1,154	2.37	–0.20	$3,625.85
Total valid votes/expense limit		48,763	99.45	–	$206,797.64
Total rejected ballots		269	0.55	+0.02	
Turnout		49,032	65.25	+12.39	
Eligible voters		75,150			
Liberal gain from Conservative		Swing		+24.90	
Source: Elections Canada

2011 Canadian federal election: Fleetwood—Port Kells
Party	Candidate	Votes	%	±%	Expenditures
Conservative	Nina Grewal	23,950	47.55	+2.85	$86,481.51
New Democratic	Nao Fernando	16,533	32.82	+10.01	$38,076.49
Liberal	Pam Dhanoa	8,041	15.96	–10.16	$75,433.15
Green	Alan Saldanha	1,476	2.93	–3.43	none listed
Libertarian	Alex Joehl	370	0.73	–	$716.90
Total valid votes/expense limit		50,370	99.47	–	$97,178.36
Total rejected ballots		266	0.53	+0.07	
Turnout		50,636	52.86	–2.71	
Eligible voters		95,797			
Conservative hold		Swing		–	
Alan Saldanha withdrew after a controversial quote on Facebook.
Source: Elections Canada

2008 Canadian federal election: Fleetwood—Port Kells
Party	Candidate	Votes	%	±%	Expenditures
Conservative	Nina Grewal	21,389	44.70	+11.22	$76,256.63
Liberal	Brenda Locke	12,502	26.13	–5.45	$64,457.86
New Democratic	Nao Fernando	10,916	22.81	–2.36	$59,346.68
Green	Brian Newbold	3,045	6.36	+3.93	$250.00
Total valid votes/expense limit		47,852	99.54	–	$88,578.77
Total rejected ballots		219	0.46	+0.16	
Turnout		48,071	55.57	–3.87	
Eligible voters		86,503			
Conservative hold		Swing		–	
Source: Elections Canada

2006 Canadian federal election: Fleetwood—Port Kells
Party	Candidate	Votes	%	±%	Expenditures
Conservative	Nina Grewal	14,577	33.47	–2.33	$72,197.70
Liberal	Brenda Locke	13,749	31.57	+2.10	$52,052.57
New Democratic	Barry Bell	10,961	25.17	–2.80	$18,396.32
Independent	Jack Cook	3,202	7.35	–	$75,818.07
Green	Duncan McDonald	1,059	2.43	–3.90	none listed
Total valid votes/expense limit		43,548	99.71	–	$76,227.74
Total rejected ballots		127	0.29	–0.26	
Turnout		43,675	59.44	+0.38	
Eligible voters		73,477			
Conservative hold		Swing		–2.22	
Source: Elections Canada

2004 Canadian federal election: Fleetwood—Port Kells
Party	Candidate	Votes	%	±%	Expenditures
Conservative	Nina Grewal	14,052	35.80	–	$67,118.70
Liberal	Gulzar Singh Cheema	11,568	29.47	–	$65,800.02
New Democratic	Barry Bell	10,976	27.97	–	$7,348.84
Green	David Walters	2,484	6.33	–	none listed
Marxist–Leninist	Joseph Theriault	167	0.43	–	none listed
Total valid votes/expense limit		39,247	99.45	–	$72,408.06
Total rejected ballots		218	0.55	–	
Turnout		39,465	59.06	–	
Eligible voters		66,821			
Source: Elections Canada
