= Surrey-Panorama =

Provincial electoral district in British Columbia, Canada

British Columbia electoral district
- Interactive map of riding boundaries

Provincial electoral district
- Legislature: Legislative Assembly of British Columbia
MLA
Bryan Tepper
Conservative
- District created: 2008
- First contested: 2009
- Last contested: 2026

Demographics
- Population (2021): 58,235
- Area (km²): 13
- Pop. density (per km²): 4,479.6
- Census division: Metro Vancouver
- Census subdivision: Surrey (part)

Surrey-Panorama is a provincial electoral district for the Legislative Assembly of British Columbia.

Created under the 2008 British Columbia electoral redistribution, the riding was first contested in the 2009 general election. It was formed from parts of Surrey-Cloverdale, Surrey-Panorama Ridge and Surrey-White Rock.

== Demographics ==
Population, 2021	58,235
Area (km^{2})	13
Pop. density (people per km^{2})	4,479
Source: BC Electoral Boundaries Commission

== Geography ==
Located in Surrey, the district comprises the area immediately north of the Panorama Ridge neighbourhood. It extends west to the municipal boundary with Delta and south to Highway 10.

== Members of the Legislative Assembly ==
This riding has elected the following members of the Legislative Assembly:

Assembly	Years	Member	Party
Surrey-Panorama; Riding created from Surrey-Cloverdale, Surrey-Panorama Ridge and Surrey-White Rock
39th	2009–2013	Stephanie Cadieux	Liberal
40th	2013–2017	Marvin Hunt	Liberal
41st	2017–2020	Jinny Sims	New Democratic
42nd	2020–2024	Jinny Sims	New Democratic
43rd	2024–2026	Bryan Tepper	Conservative
44th	2026–present	Bryan Tepper	Conservative

== Election results ==
2026 British Columbia general election
Party	Candidate	Votes	%	±%	Expenditures
Conservative	Bryan Tepper	8,599	58.72	+9.12	
New Democratic	Jinny Sims	4,899	33.45	-14.65	
Green	Nolen Scott	750	5.12	-	
CentreBC	Manav Manro	382	2.61	-	
Total valid votes		14,630	99.90		
Total rejected ballots		15	0.10		
Turnout					
Registered voters					
Conservative hold		Swing		+11.88	
Source: Elections BC

2024 British Columbia general election
Party	Candidate	Votes	%	±%	Expenditures
Conservative	Bryan Tepper	8,735	49.6%		
New Democratic	Jinny Sims	8,472	48.1%	-6.97	
Freedom	Paramjit Rai	404	2.3%		
Total valid votes		17,611	–		
Total rejected ballots					
Turnout					
Registered voters					
Source: Elections BC

2020 British Columbia general election
Party	Candidate	Votes	%	±%	Expenditures
New Democratic	Jinny Sims	12,336	55.07	+4.22	$60,769.34
Liberal	Gulzar Cheema	9,607	42.89	+1.03	$65,963.02
Vision	Sophie Shrestha	458	2.04	–	$0.00
Total valid votes		22,401	100.00	–	
Total rejected ballots		240	1.06	+0.27	
Turnout		22,641	51.65	−9.39	
Registered voters		43,835			
New Democratic hold		Swing		+1.60	
Source: Elections BC

2017 British Columbia general election
Party	Candidate	Votes	%	±%	Expenditures
New Democratic	Jinny Sims	12,227	50.85	+15.11	$64,840
Liberal	Puneet Sandhar	10,064	41.86	−12.43	$66,078
Green	Veronica Laurel Greer	1,620	6.74	+1.06	$0
Refederation	Liz Galenzoski	132	0.55	–	$250
Total valid votes		24,043	100.00	–	
Total rejected ballots		192	0.79	+0.14	
Turnout		24,235	61.04	+3.32	
Registered voters		39,701			
Source: Elections BC

2013 British Columbia general election
Party	Candidate	Votes	%	±%	Expenditures
Liberal	Marvin Hunt	14,139	54.29	+0.03	$100,799
New Democratic	Amrik Mahil	9,308	35.74	−4.08	$72,318
Green	Sara Sharma	1,478	5.68	−0.24	$4,550
Conservative	Kevin Rakhra	1,037	3.98	–	$20,744
No Affiliation	Ali Zaidi	81	0.31	–	$1,056
Total valid votes		26,043	100.00		
Total rejected ballots		171	0.65		
Turnout		26,214	57.72		
Eligible voters		45,415			
Source: Elections BC

2009 British Columbia general election
Party	Candidate	Votes	%	±%
Liberal	Stephanie Cadieux	11,820	54.26%	n/a
New Democratic	Debbie Lawrance	8,675	39.82%	n/a
Green	Murray Weisenburger	1,290	5.92%	n/a
Total		21,785	100.00%	

== See also ==
- List of British Columbia provincial electoral districts
- Canadian provincial electoral districts
