= Sujapur, Punjab =

Sujapur
- Village
- Location in Punjab, India Sujapur (India)
- Coordinates: 30.75°N 75.56°E
- Country: India
- State: Punjab
- District: Ludhiana
- Talukas: Jagraon
- Elevation: 237 m (778 ft)

Population (2010)
  - Total: 1,478

Languages
  - Official: Punjabi
  - Regional: Punjabi
- Time zone: UTC+5:30 (IST)
- PIN: 142026

Sujapur is a village located in the Jagraon Tehsil of Ludhiana district in Punjab state 8.9 km from Chowkimann, which is near NH-95. It is 40.8 km from the main city Ludhiana and 11.1 km from Jagraon. The village's population is estimated at 1,300 and most have migrated abroad, mainly to Canada, the US and the United Kingdom. The village has a state run primary school and a high school. It also has a gurdwara at the village center where people go to pray and celebrate on various religious occasions. There is also a mandir at the edge of village which is named Sati-ana.

== Culture ==
The people of Sujapur belong to Malwa. Punjabi is the local language here.

== Transportation ==
By Rail

- Chaunkimann Railway Station 9 km from the village.
- Ludhiana Railway Station 36 km from the village.
- Apart from that local buses and tempos are used.

== Colleges and schools ==
- Ludhiana Group of Colleges Chaukimann, Ferozepur Road, Ludhiana, Punjab 141001
- Guru Hargobind Public Sr. Sec. School Sidhwan Khurad, Ludhiana, 142024
- Anand Isher Public School, Kothe Pona.

== Images of landmarks in village ==
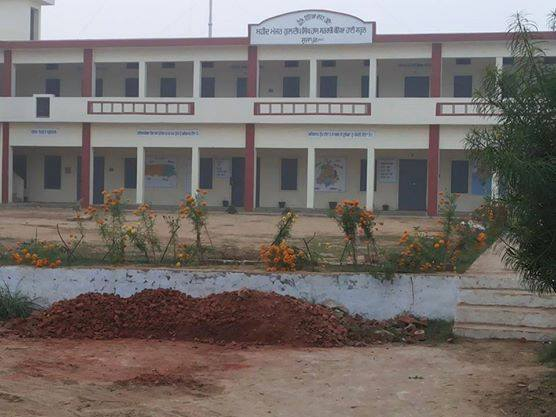
Shaheed Major Kuldeep Singh Hans Government High school Sujapur

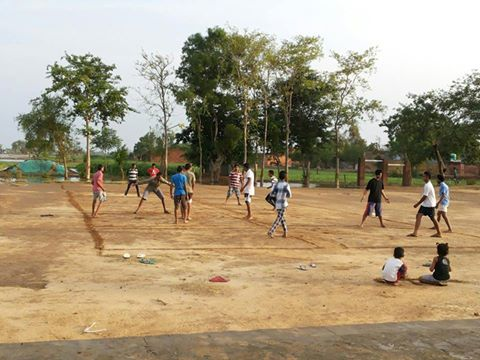
Sujapur village Playground

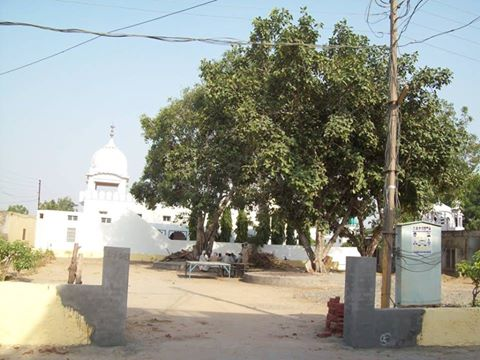
Village Gurudwara and Darwaja

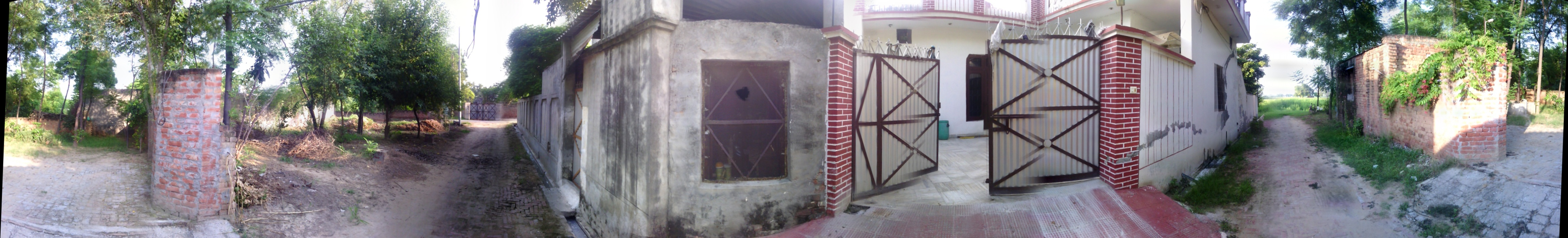
Panorama of Sujapur village from 2015-09-06
