= Results breakdown of the 2006 Canadian federal election =

Results of the 39th Canadian federal election

2006 Canadian federal election
| ← 2004 | January 23, 2006 | 2008 → |
- 308 seats in the House of Commons; 155 seats needed for a majority
| Party | Leader | Vote % | Seats | +/– |
|---|---|---|---|---|
| Conservative | Stephen Harper | 36.27 | 124 | +25 |
| Liberal | Paul Martin | 30.23 | 103 | −32 |
| Bloc Québécois | Gilles Duceppe | 10.48 | 51 | −3 |
| New Democratic | Jack Layton | 17.48 | 29 | +10 |
This lists parties that won seats. See the complete results below.

The 39th Canadian federal election was held on January 23, 2006.

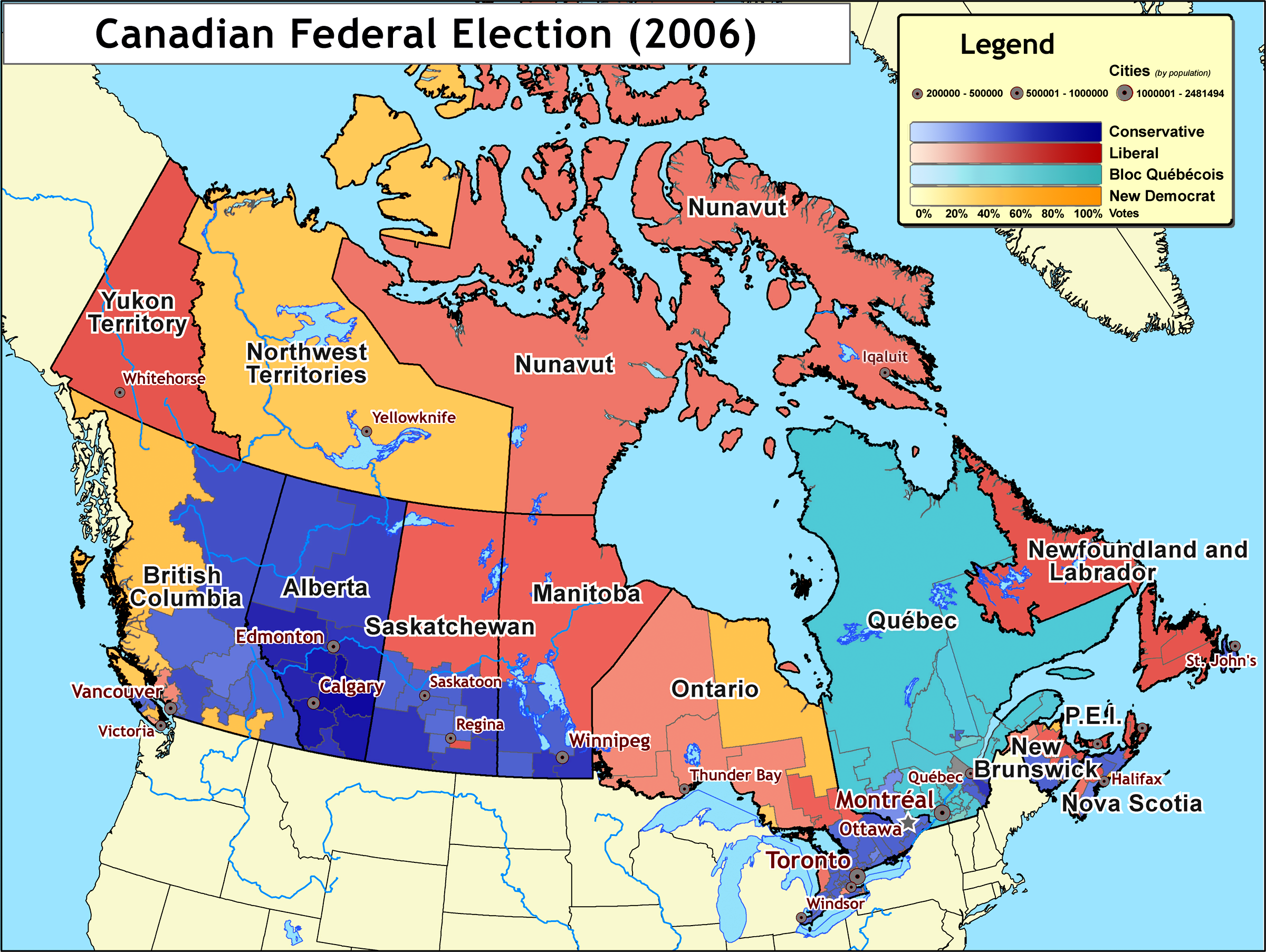
Map of the 2006 Canadian federal election results, showing Alberta as the main stronghold for the Conservative party, with significant support also coming from the interior regions of British Columbia, southern Saskatchewan, and Manitoba, as well as southern Ontario. Liberal support was greatest in urban areas, particularly in the Toronto area.

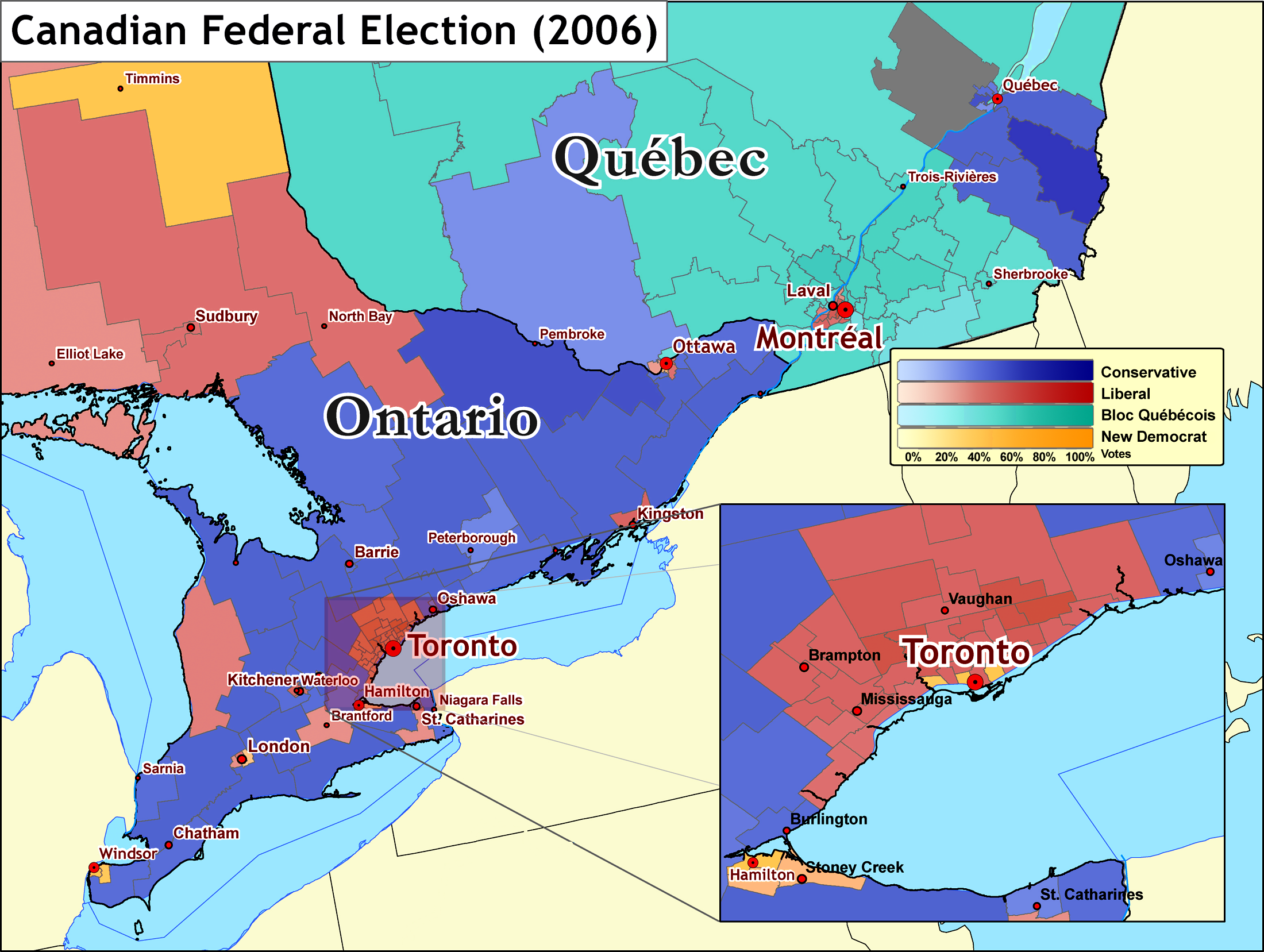
Election results in southern Ontario and Quebec.

The Conservative Party of Canada, led by Stephen Harper, won a minority government. The Conservatives won 124 seats. The former governing party, the Liberal Party of Canada, won 103 seats. The separatist Bloc Québécois won 51 seats and the social-democratic New Democratic Party 29. An independent candidate won a seat in Quebec. The Conservatives won only 40.3% of the seats, the smallest share of house seats ever won by a government in an election. The Conservative's 36.3% of the vote was also the smallest vote share of a first-placed party until the 2019 Canadian federal election.

== Gains and losses ==
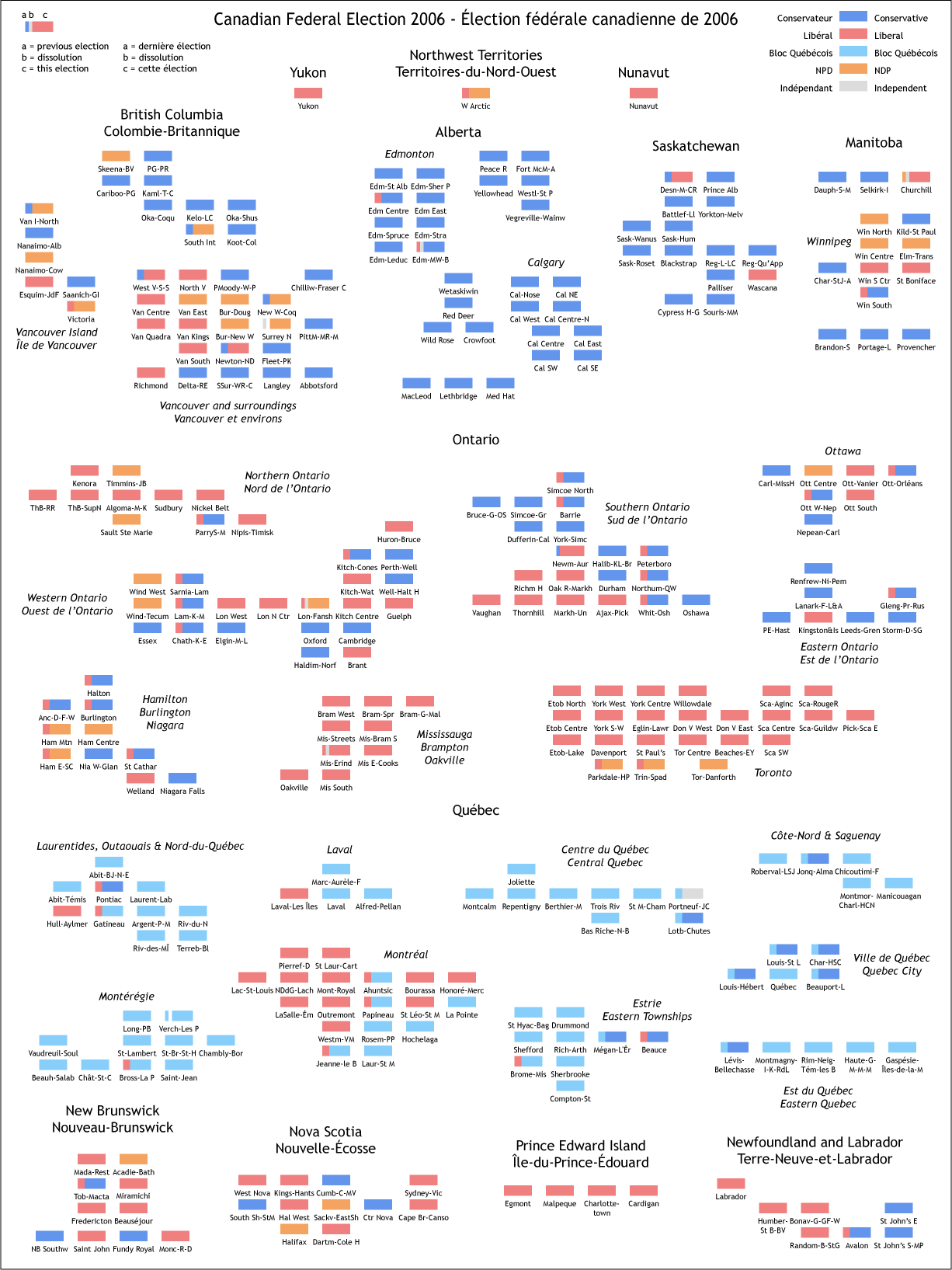
A visual representation of the seat changes from 2004 to 2006.

Elections to the 39th Parliament of Canada – seats won/lost by party, 2004–2006
| Party | 2004 | Gain from (loss to) | | | | | | | | | | 2006 |
| Party | 2004 | Con | | Lib | | BQ | | NDP | | Ind | | 2006 |
|---|---|---|---|---|---|---|---|---|---|---|---|---|
| Conservative | 99 | | | 24 | (4) | 8 | | | (3) | | | 124 |
| Liberal | 135 | 4 | (24) | | | | (6) | 1 | (7) | | | 103 |
| Bloc Québécois | 54 | | (8) | 6 | | | | | | | (1) | 51 |
| New Democratic | 19 | 3 | | 7 | (1) | | | | | 1 | | 29 |
| Independent | 1 | | | | | 1 | | | (1) | | | 1 |
| Total | 308 | 7 | (32) | 37 | (5) | 9 | (6) | 1 | (11) | 1 | (1) | 308 |

The following seats changed allegiance from the 2004 election:

Conservative to Liberal

- Desnethé—Missinippi—Churchill River
- Newmarket—Aurora
- Newton—North Delta
- West Vancouver—Sunshine Coast—Sea to Sky Country

Conservative to NDP

- British Columbia Southern Interior
- New Westminster—Coquitlam
- Vancouver Island North

Liberal to Conservative

- Ancaster—Dundas—Flamborough—Westdale
- Avalon
- Barrie
- Beauce
- Burlington
- Chatham-Kent—Essex
- Edmonton Centre
- Edmonton—Mill Woods—Beaumont
- Glengarry—Prescott—Russell
- Halton
- Kitchener—Conestoga
- Lambton—Kent—Middlesex
- Northumberland—Quinte West
- Ottawa West—Nepean
- Ottawa—Orléans
- Parry Sound-Muskoka
- Peterborough
- Pontiac
- Sarnia—Lambton
- Simcoe North
- St. Catharines
- Tobique—Mactaquac
- Whitby—Oshawa
- Winnipeg South

Liberal to Bloc

- Ahuntsic
- Brome—Missisquoi
- Brossard—La Prairie
- Gatineau
- Jeanne-Le Ber
- Papineau

Liberal to NDP

- Hamilton East—Stoney Creek
- Hamilton Mountain
- Parkdale—High Park
- London—Fanshawe
- Trinity—Spadina
- Victoria
- Western Arctic

Bloc to Conservative

- Beauport—Limoilou
- Charlesbourg—Haute-Saint-Charles
- Jonquière—Alma
- Lévis—Bellechasse
- Lotbinière—Chutes-de-la-Chaudière
- Louis-Hébert
- Louis-Saint-Laurent
- Mégantic—L'Érable

Bloc to Independent

- Portneuf—Jacques-Cartier

NDP to Liberal

- Churchill

Independent to NDP

- Surrey North

== Results by electoral district ==
- All on one page
- Newfoundland and Labrador
- Prince Edward Island
- Nova Scotia
- New Brunswick
- Quebec
- Ontario
- Manitoba
- Saskatchewan
- Alberta
- British Columbia
- Nunavut
- Northwest Territories
- Yukon

== Atlantic provinces ==
The Liberals won 20 seats in the Atlantic Provinces, the Conservatives nine and the NDP three. This is a swing of two seats from the Liberals to the Conservatives.

=== Newfoundland and Labrador ===
The Liberals won four seats and the Conservatives three. The Avalon seat changed hands from the Liberals to the Tories. The seat had been held by Natural Resources Minister John Efford, who is retiring. Fabian Manning has won the seat for the Conservatives over Bill Morrow.

Results in Newfoundland and Labrador
| Party | Seats | Second | Third | Fourth | Votes | % | +/- |
|---|---|---|---|---|---|---|---|
| Liberals | 4 | 3 | | | 97,452 | 42.83 | -5.16 |
| Conservative | 3 | 4 | | | 97,159 | 42.7 | +10.38 |
| NDP | | | 7 | | 30,882 | 13.57 | -3.91 |
| Green | | | | 7 | 2,046 | 0.9 | -0.67 |
| Total | 7 | | | | 227,539 | 100.0 | |

=== Prince Edward Island ===
All four Liberal incumbents have been re-elected. This is the sixth consecutive sweep of Prince Edward Island for the federal Liberals.

Results in Prince Edward Island
| Party | Seats | Votes | % | +/- |
|---|---|---|---|---|
| Liberal | 4 | 41,195 | 52.57 | 0.0 |
| Conservative | 0 | 26,146 | 33.36 | +2.7 |
| New Democratic | 0 | 7,491 | 9.56 | -2.9 |
| Green | 0 | 3,025 | 3.86 | -0.3 |
| Independent | 0 | 219 | 0.28 | - |
| Marijuana | 0 | 193 | 0.25 | - |
| Christian Heritage | 0 | 97 | 0.12 | 0.0 |
| Total | | 78,366 | 100.00 | |

=== Nova Scotia ===
All incumbent MPs in Nova Scotia were re-elected. There are six Liberal, three Conservatives and two NDP MPs in the province.

Results in Nova Scotia
| Party | Seats | Votes | % | +/- |
|---|---|---|---|---|
| Liberal | 6 | 177,406 | 37.16 | -2.5 |
| Conservative | 3 | 141,756 | 29.69 | +1.7 |
| New Democratic | 2 | 142,520 | 29.85 | +1.5 |
| Green | 0 | 12,400 | 2.60 | -0.7 |
| Christian Heritage | 0 | 1,376 | 0.29 | +0.2 |
| Independent | 0 | 1,206 | 0.25 | +0.1 |
| Marijuana | 0 | 436 | 0.09 | 0.0 |
| Marxist–Leninist | 0 | 344 | 0.07 | +0.1 |
| Total | | 477,444 | 100.0 | |

=== New Brunswick ===
Conservative Mike Allen defeated incumbent MP Andy Savoy in Tobique—Mactaquac.

In the open seat of Moncton—Riverview—Dieppe, formerly held by Claudette Bradshaw, Brian Murphy kept the seat for the Liberals.

Results in New Brunswick
| Party | Seats | Votes | % | +/- |
|---|---|---|---|---|
| Liberal | 6 | 159,393 | 39.16 | -5.4 |
| Conservative | 3 | 145,719 | 35.80 | +4.7 |
| New Democratic | 1 | 89,217 | 21.92 | +1.3 |
| Green | 0 | 9,737 | 2.39 | -1.0 |
| Independent | 0 | 2,776 | 0.68 | +0.5 |
| Canadian Action | 0 | 150 | 0.04 | -0.1 |
| Total | | 407,373 | 100.0 | |

== Québec ==
The Conservatives replaced the Liberals as the major federalist party in Québec outside of Montreal, winning eight seats from the Bloc Québécois and two from the Liberals. The Liberals lost five Montreal-area seats and Gatineau to the Bloc.

The Bloc retained its majority of seats in Québec. However, the sovereigntist party failed to garner more than 50% of the popular vote, which early polls during the election campaign had indicated was a strong possibility. The Bloc's share of the vote actually declined as support for the Conservatives surged. The Conservatives unexpectedly won several seats in the Quebec City region, including Beauport—Limoilou, Charlesbourg—Haute-Saint-Charles, Lévis—Bellechasse, and Louis-Hébert, all of which had been considered safe seats for the Bloc Québécois.

Several high-profile cabinet ministers also lost their seats. Minister of Canadian Heritage, Liza Frulla, lost her re-election bid to the Bloc's Thierry St-Cyr in Jeanne-Le Ber while Minister of Foreign Affairs Pierre Pettigrew lost to the Bloc's Vivian Barbot in Papineau.

In Portneuf—Jacques-Cartier, independent candidate and former radio host André Arthur defeated incumbent Guy Côté of the Bloc.

In Vaudreuil—Soulanges, the Liberal star candidate and former astronaut Marc Garneau failed in his bid to unseat the incumbent Bloc MP Meili Faille.

Also of note, out of every Canadian federal election held since Confederation in 1867, the Liberals attained their lowest historical share of the popular vote, with only 20.7%. Although their all-time lowest share of seats was 12 in 1988, their support managed to get them one more seat, 13, this time.

Results in Quebec
| Party | Seats | Votes | % | +/- |
|---|---|---|---|---|
| Bloc Québécois | 51 | 1,553,201 | 42.08 | -6.8 |
| Liberal | 13 | 766,228 | 20.76 | -13.1 |
| Conservative | 10 | 907,972 | 24.60 | +15.8 |
| New Democratic | 0 | 276,401 | 7.49 | +2.9 |
| Green | 0 | 146,576 | 3.97 | +0.8 |
| Independent | 1 | 32,378 | 0.88 | +0.8 |
| Marxist–Leninist | 0 | 3,063 | 0.08 | 0.0 |
| Progressive Canadian | 0 | 2,535 | 0.07 | - |
| Marijuana | 0 | 1,857 | 0.05 | -0.3 |
| Libertarian | 0 | 477 | 0.01 | 0.0 |
| Canadian Action | 0 | 185 | 0.01 | 0.0 |
| Communist | 0 | 169 | 0.005 | 0.0 |
| Christian Heritage | 0 | 116 | 0.003 | 0.0 |
| Total | | 3,691,158 | 100.00 | |

== Ontario ==
The Liberals lost 21 seats in the province; 17 to the Conservatives and four to the New Democratic Party.

The NDP's Irene Mathyssen won the seat of London—Fanshawe, which was previously held by independent MP Pat O'Brien. O'Brien was formerly a Liberal, until June 2005, when he left the Liberals and became an independent.

In Hamilton East—Stoney Creek, Wayne Marston of the NDP defeated Tony Valeri, who held the position of leader of the government in the House of Commons. In Hamilton Mountain, the NDP's Chris Charlton won the seat vacated by Beth Phinney, who retired.

Elsewhere in the Hamilton area, Conservative David Sweet defeated Russ Powers, the Liberal incumbent in Ancaster—Dundas—Flamborough—Westdale.

In Ottawa, NDP candidate Paul Dewar was elected in Ottawa Centre, succeeding retiring NDP MP and former leader Ed Broadbent. The Conservatives gained two seats in Ottawa, with Ontario MPP John Baird picking up the open seat in Ottawa West—Nepean to succeed retiring Liberal MP Marlene Catterall, defeating Liberal candidate Lee Farnworth, and Royal Galipeau defeating Liberal incumbent Marc Godbout in Ottawa—Orléans. All other Ottawa ridings saw their incumbents re-elected.

Liberal cabinet ministers Andy Mitchell and Aileen Carroll lost their seats to Conservatives. Tony Clement, a former provincial cabinet member, defeated Mitchell, the federal agriculture minister, in Parry Sound-Muskoka. Carroll, the minister of international cooperation, lost her Barrie seat to Patrick Brown.

Olivia Chow, the wife of NDP leader Jack Layton, defeated Liberal MP Tony Ianno in Trinity—Spadina. Layton won his Toronto—Danforth seat.

In Newmarket—Aurora, Belinda Stronach, elected in 2004 as a Conservative, won re-election as a Liberal.

Controversial writer and professor Michael Ignatieff won the Etobicoke—Lakeshore seat for the Liberals. The seat was formerly held by Jean Augustine.

The Conservatives did not win any seats in the city of Toronto but dominated the smaller urban and rural portions of central, eastern and southwestern Ontario.

Results in Ontario (99.99% of polls)
| Party | Seats | Votes | % | +/- |
|---|---|---|---|---|
| Liberal | 54 | 2,260,024 | 39.94 | -4.8 |
| Conservative | 40 | 1,985,242 | 35.09 | +6.2 |
| New Democratic | 12 | 1,100,366 | 19.45 | +1.3 |
| Green | 0 | 263,400 | 4.66 | +0.3 |
| Christian Heritage | 0 | 16,606 | 0.29 | -0.2 |
| Progressive Canadian | 0 | 9,586 | 0.17 | 0.0 |
| Independent | 0 | 8,972 | 0.16 | -0.1 |
| Marijuana | 0 | 4,182 | 0.07 | -0.1 |
| Marxist–Leninist | 0 | 3,640 | 0.06 | 0.0 |
| Canadian Action | 0 | 2,374 | 0.04 | 0.0 |
| Communist | 0 | 1,581 | 0.03 | 0.0 |
| Libertarian | 0 | 1,635 | 0.03 | 0.0 |
| First Peoples National | 0 | 563 | 0.01 | - |
| Animal Alliance | 0 | 72 | 0.0013 | - |
| Total | | 5,658,243 | 100.0 | |

== Prairie provinces ==
=== Manitoba ===
Preliminary results show the Conservatives with eight seats in Manitoba, an increase of one from 2004.

In Winnipeg South, Conservative Rod Bruinooge won by 110 votes over Liberal Treasury Board President Reg Alcock.

The Liberals maintain their three-seat total in the province by winning the Churchill seat. Actress Tina Keeper defeated incumbent Bev Desjarlais, who ran as an independent after losing her party's nomination for opposing same-sex marriage.

Results in Manitoba
| Party | Seats | Votes | % | +/- |
|---|---|---|---|---|
| Conservative | 8 | 220,493 | 42.77 | +3.7 |
| Liberal | 3 | 134,162 | 26.02 | -7.2 |
| New Democratic | 3 | 130,856 | 25.38 | +1.9 |
| Green | 0 | 19,925 | 3.87 | +1.2 |
| Independent | 0 | 5,776 | 1.12 | +1.1 |
| Christian Heritage | 0 | 2,868 | 0.56 | -0.3 |
| Progressive Canadian | 0 | 934 | 0.18 | - |
| Communist | 0 | 442 | 0.09 | -0.8 |
| Canadian Action | 0 | 66 | 0.01 | 0.0 |
| Total | | 515,522 | 100.0 | |

=== Saskatchewan ===
The Liberals actually picked up a seat from the Conservatives in this province. Liberal Gary Merasty defeated incumbent Jeremy Harrison in Desnethé—Missinippi—Churchill River by 106 votes.

Ralph Goodale, the embattled Liberal finance minister, won re-election in Wascana.

All other Saskatchewan seats went to the Tories, as in 2004.

Results in Saskatchewan
| Party | Seats | Votes | % | +/- |
|---|---|---|---|---|
| Conservative | 12 | 226,563 | 48.98 | +7.1 |
| Liberal | 2 | 103,440 | 22.36 | -4.8 |
| New Democratic | 0 | 111,253 | 24.05 | +0.6 |
| Green | 0 | 14,784 | 3.20 | +0.5 |
| Independent | 0 | 5,437 | 1.18 | +1.0 |
| Christian Heritage | 0 | 871 | 0.19 | -0.1 |
| Canadian Action | 0 | 121 | 0.03 | - |
| Communist | 0 | 94 | 0.02 | - |
| Total | | 462,563 | 100.0 | |

=== Alberta ===
The Conservatives swept all 28 seats in the province. They picked up the Edmonton—Mill Woods—Beaumont seat held by retiring independent MP David Kilgour and the Edmonton Centre seat held by Liberal Deputy Prime Minister Anne McLellan.

Results in Alberta
| Party | Seats | Votes | % | +/- |
|---|---|---|---|---|
| Conservative | 28 | 931,701 | 65.03 | +3.3 |
| Liberal | 0 | 219,214 | 15.30 | -6.7 |
| New Democratic | 0 | 167,394 | 11.68 | +2.2 |
| Green | 0 | 93,732 | 6.54 | +0.5 |
| Independent | 0 | 13,897 | 0.97 | +1.0 |
| Christian Heritage | 0 | 2,866 | 0.20 | 0.0 |
| Canadian Action | 0 | 1,101 | 0.08 | 0.0 |
| Progressive Canadian | 0 | 582 | 0.04 | 0.0 |
| First Peoples National | 0 | 543 | 0.04 | - |
| Marxist–Leninist | 0 | 542 | 0.04 | 0.0 |
| Western Block | 0 | 431 | 0.03 | - |
| Marijuana | 0 | 390 | 0.03 | -0.2 |
| Communist | 0 | 324 | 0.02 | 0.0 |
| Total | | 1,432,717 | 100.0 | |

== British Columbia ==
BC was the one province in which the Conservatives lost significant ground. The Tories won 17 seats, down from 22 in 2004. The NDP doubled its seat count from five to 10, while the Liberals won nine seats, up from eight last time. (An independent won a BC seat in 2004.)

The NDP won three seats held by the Tories, including the British Columbia Southern Interior riding held by the retiring Jim Gouk.

Penny Priddy won the Surrey North seat that independent Chuck Cadman held before his July 2005 death.

In Esquimalt—Juan de Fuca, former Conservative Keith Martin won re-election as a Liberal. The Liberals also picked up the Newton—North Delta seat with Sukh Dhaliwal winning the riding, which had been held by scandal-ridden Conservative Gurmant Grewal.

Svend Robinson, the controversial former NDP MP who had left politics after admitting to stealing a ring in 2004, failed in his bid to return to Parliament. Liberal incumbent Hedy Fry defeated him in Vancouver Centre.

The four British Columbian ministers in Paul Martin's Cabinet (Raymond Chan, Ujjal Dosanjh, David Emerson and Stephen Owen) all retained their Lower Mainland seats.

Results in British Columbia
| Party | Seats | Votes | % | +/- |
|---|---|---|---|---|
| Conservative | 17 | 682,109 | 37.33 | +1.0 |
| New Democratic | 10 | 521,473 | 28.54 | +2.0 |
| Liberal | 9 | 504,738 | 27.62 | -1.0 |
| Green | 0 | 97,002 | 5.31 | -1.0 |
| Independent | 0 | 11,050 | 0.60 | +0.3 |
| Christian Heritage | 0 | 2,866 | 0.20 | -0.1 |
| Canadian Action | 0 | 1,101 | 0.08 | -0.2 |
| Marxist–Leninist | 0 | 1,391 | 0.08 | 0.0 |
| Marijuana | 0 | 1,389 | 0.08 | -0.1 |
| Libertarian | 0 | 890 | 0.05 | 0.0 |
| Western Block | 0 | 663 | 0.04 | - |
| Progressive Canadian | 0 | 514 | 0.03 | - |
| Communist | 0 | 412 | 0.02 | -0.1 |
| First Peoples National | 0 | 95 | 0.01 | - |
| Total | | 1,827,183 | 100.0 | |

== Territories ==
Liberal candidates won re-election in Nunavut and Yukon.

However, in Western Arctic (the Northwest Territories), NDP candidate Dennis Bevington defeated Liberal incumbent Ethel Blondin-Andrew.

Results in Nunavut
| Party | Seats | Votes | % | +/- |
|---|---|---|---|---|
| Liberal | 1 | 3,673 | 39.98 | -12.2 |
| Conservative | 0 | 2,670 | 29.06 | +15.2 |
| New Democratic | 0 | 1,576 | 17.15 | +2.4 |
| Marijuana | 0 | 724 | 7.88 | - |
| Green | 0 | 544 | 5.92 | +2.6 |
| Total | | 9,187 | 100.0 | |

Results in the Northwest Territories
| Party | Seats | Votes | % | +/- |
|---|---|---|---|---|
| New Democratic | 1 | 6,802 | 42.16 | +3.0 |
| Liberal | 0 | 5,643 | 34.98 | -10.8 |
| Conservative | 0 | 3,200 | 19.84 | +1.6 |
| Green | 0 | 338 | 2.10 | -2.0 |
| Independent | 0 | 149 | 0.92 | +0.92 |
| Total | | 16,132 | 100.0 | |

Results in the Yukon
| Party | Seats | Votes | % | +/- |
|---|---|---|---|---|
| Liberal | 1 | 6,847 | 48.52 | +2.8 |
| New Democratic | 0 | 3,366 | 23.85 | -1.8 |
| Conservative | 0 | 3,341 | 23.67 | +1.8 |
| Green | 0 | 559 | 3.96 | -0.6 |
| Total | | 14,113 | 100.0 | |

== Defeated cabinet ministers ==
- Deputy Prime Minister Anne McLellan (Edmonton Centre)
- Minister of Agriculture and Agri-Food Andy Mitchell (Parry Sound-Muskoka)
- Minister of Canadian Heritage Liza Frulla (Jeanne-Le Ber)
- Minister of the Economic Development Agency of Canada for the Regions of Quebec Jacques Saada (Brossard—La Prairie)
- Minister of Foreign Affairs Pierre Pettigrew (Papineau)
- Minister for International Cooperation Aileen Carroll (Barrie)
- Government House Leader Tony Valeri (Hamilton East—Stoney Creek)
- President of the Treasury Board Reg Alcock (Winnipeg South)
- Minister of State (Families and Caregivers) Tony Ianno (Trinity—Spadina)
- Minister of State (Northern Development) Ethel Blondin-Andrew (Western Arctic)

== Demographics analysis ==
An exit poll was carried out by Ipsos Reid polling firm. The poll overestimated the NDP's support and underestimated the Liberals' support. Here is a results breakdown by demographics:

2006 vote by demographic subgroup (Ipsos Reid Exit Polling)
| Demographic subgroup | LPC | CPC | NDP | GPC | BQ | Other | % of voters |
|---|---|---|---|---|---|---|---|
| Total vote | 26 | 36 | 21 | 5 | 12 | 1 | 100 |
Ideological self-placement
| Liberals | 54 | 9 | 25 | 6 | 6 | 1 | 30 |
| Moderates | 17 | 31 | 24 | 6 | 19 | 1 | 51 |
| Conservatives | 3 | 88 | 4 | 2 | 2 | 1 | 20 |
Gender
| Men | 25 | 38 | 18 | 5 | 12 | 1 | 49 |
| Women | 26 | 33 | 23 | 5 | 11 | 1 | 51 |
Immigrant
| Born in Canada | 25 | 36 | 21 | 5 | 13 | 1 | 89 |
| Born in another country | 34 | 36 | 21 | 6 | 2 | 1 | 11 |
Marital status
| Single | 26 | 25 | 24 | 7 | 17 | 1 | 21 |
| Married | 26 | 44 | 18 | 4 | 7 | 1 | 52 |
| Domestic Partnership | 21 | 26 | 24 | 6 | 21 | 1 | 13 |
| Widowed | 28 | 38 | 24 | 3 | 7 | 1 | 3 |
| Divorced | 26 | 30 | 23 | 5 | 14 | 1 | 7 |
| Separated | 26 | 32 | 24 | 6 | 10 | 1 | 3 |
| Don't know/Won't say | 23 | 22 | 29 | 6 | 18 | 2 | 1 |
Religious identity
| Catholic | 24 | 30 | 15 | 4 | 25 | 1 | 36 |
| Protestant or Other Christian | 26 | 48 | 20 | 4 | 0 | 1 | 37 |
| Muslim | 49 | 15 | 28 | 1 | 5 | 1 | 1 |
| Jewish | 52 | 25 | 15 | 5 | 1 | 1 | 1 |
| Hindu | 43 | 30 | 21 | 5 | 1 | 0 | 0 |
| Sikh | 39 | 16 | 40 | 5 | 4 | 0 | 0 |
| Other religion | 26 | 26 | 33 | 5 | 0 | 1 | 5 |
| None | 25 | 26 | 28 | 8 | 12 | 1 | 19 |
| Don't know/Refused | 29 | 27 | 26 | 8 | 8 | 2 | 1 |
Religious service attendance
| More than once a week | 18 | 63 | 11 | 3 | 2 | 2 | 5 |
| Once a week | 25 | 51 | 15 | 4 | 3 | 1 | 10 |
| A few times a month | 30 | 41 | 20 | 4 | 4 | 1 | 6 |
| Once a month | 29 | 36 | 23 | 6 | 6 | 1 | 2 |
| A few times a year | 29 | 35 | 19 | 4 | 12 | 1 | 16 |
| At least once a year | 24 | 31 | 19 | 5 | 21 | 1 | 12 |
| Not at all | 25 | 31 | 13 | 6 | 14 | 1 | 48 |
| Don't know/refused | 25 | 31 | 26 | 5 | 10 | 3 | 1 |
Age
| 18–34 years old | 22 | 29 | 25 | 7 | 17 | 1 | 27 |
| 35–54 years old | 25 | 37 | 20 | 5 | 11 | 1 | 41 |
| 55 and older | 29 | 41 | 17 | 3 | 8 | 1 | 31 |
Age by gender
| Men 18–34 years old | 23 | 30 | 23 | 7 | 16 | 1 | 14 |
| Men 35–54 years old | 25 | 39 | 18 | 6 | 12 | 1 | 21 |
| Men 55 and older | 26 | 45 | 16 | 4 | 8 | 1 | 14 |
| Women 18–34 years old | 21 | 27 | 26 | 7 | 18 | 1 | 13 |
| Women 35–54 years old | 25 | 34 | 23 | 5 | 11 | 1 | 21 |
| Women 55 and older | 32 | 36 | 21 | 3 | 8 | 1 | 17 |
Sexual orientation
| LGBT | 36 | 8 | 33 | 6 | 17 | 0 | 4 |
| Non-LGBT | 25 | 37 | 20 | 5 | 12 | 1 | 95 |
| Don't know/Refused | 23 | 24 | 21 | 11 | 10 | 3 | 1 |
First time voter
| First time voter | 24 | 29 | 27 | 7 | 12 | 1 | 5 |
| Everyone else | 26 | 36 | 20 | 5 | 12 | 1 | 95 |
Education
| Primary school or less | 27 | 39 | 14 | 2 | 14 | 4 | 0 |
| Some High school | 23 | 38 | 19 | 4 | 14 | 1 | 5 |
| High school | 22 | 40 | 20 | 4 | 13 | 1 | 16 |
| Some CC/CEGEP/Trades school | 23 | 38 | 21 | 5 | 11 | 1 | 17 |
| CC/CEGEP/Trades school | 23 | 37 | 20 | 5 | 12 | 1 | 20 |
| Some University | 27 | 32 | 21 | 6 | 13 | 1 | 13 |
| University undergraduate degree | 29 | 30 | 21 | 7 | 12 | 1 | 18 |
| University graduate degree | 33 | 30 | 20 | 6 | 9 | 1 | 10 |
| Don't know/Won't say | 26 | 36 | 21 | 5 | 12 | 1 | 0 |
Smoking
| Smoker | 23 | 32 | 24 | 5 | 15 | 1 | 22 |
| Non-smoker | 26 | 37 | 20 | 5 | 11 | 1 | 17 |
Employment
| Employed full-time | 25 | 35 | 20 | 5 | 13 | 1 | 42 |
| Employed part-time | 24 | 35 | 23 | 5 | 11 | 1 | 9 |
| Self-employed | 27 | 39 | 17 | 6 | 9 | 1 | 10 |
| Homemaker | 22 | 43 | 20 | 4 | 9 | 1 | 5 |
| Student | 25 | 20 | 29 | 8 | 17 | 1 | 7 |
| Retired | 30 | 41 | 17 | 3 | 9 | 1 | 17 |
| Currently unemployed | 23 | 30 | 25 | 7 | 13 | 2 | 4 |
| Other | 25 | 30 | 30 | 5 | 9 | 1 | 3 |
Household income
| Under $10K | 23 | 26 | 28 | 7 | 14 | 1 | 3 |
| $10K to $15K | 21 | 25 | 30 | 6 | 17 | 1 | 3 |
| $15K to $20K | 24 | 28 | 27 | 6 | 14 | 1 | 3 |
| $20K to $25K | 22 | 30 | 26 | 5 | 15 | 1 | 4 |
| $25K to $30K | 23 | 34 | 22 | 6 | 14 | 2 | 5 |
| $30K to $35K | 22 | 32 | 24 | 5 | 15 | 1 | 6 |
| $35K to $40K | 24 | 34 | 22 | 4 | 14 | 1 | 6 |
| $40K to $45K | 24 | 33 | 21 | 5 | 15 | 1 | 7 |
| $45K to $55K | 24 | 35 | 22 | 4 | 13 | 1 | 10 |
| $55K to $60K | 24 | 38 | 19 | 5 | 13 | 1 | 6 |
| $60K to $70K | 25 | 38 | 21 | 4 | 11 | 1 | 9 |
| $70K to $80K | 27 | 39 | 19 | 4 | 10 | 1 | 9 |
| $80K to $100K | 26 | 39 | 18 | 6 | 10 | 1 | 11 |
| $100K to $120K | 30 | 38 | 17 | 6 | 8 | 1 | 7 |
| $120K to $150K | 32 | 41 | 14 | 6 | 6 | 1 | 5 |
| $150K or more | 32 | 43 | 14 | 6 | 4 | 1 | 4 |
Union membership
| Union | 22 | 31 | 25 | 5 | 16 | 1 | 32 |
| Non-union | 27 | 38 | 19 | 5 | 10 | 1 | 68 |
Home ownership
| Own | 26 | 40 | 18 | 5 | 9 | 1 | 68 |
| Rent | 24 | 26 | 23 | 5 | 18 | 1 | 28 |
| Neither | 22 | 23 | 23 | 6 | 24 | 2 | 3 |
Region
| British Columbia and Yukon | 25 | 37 | 31 | 5 | n/a | 1 | 13 |
| Alberta, NWT and Nunavut | 14 | 65 | 14 | 7 | n/a | 1 | 10 |
| Saskatchewan and Manitoba | 22 | 44 | 28 | 5 | n/a | 2 | 7 |
| Ontario | 35 | 36 | 23 | 6 | n/a | 1 | 38 |
| Quebec | 15 | 23 | 10 | 4 | 47 | 1 | 25 |
| Atlantic Canada | 36 | 30 | 29 | 4 | n/a | 1 | 8 |
CMA
| Greater Vancouver | 30 | 33 | 30 | 5 | n/a | 1 | 5 |
| Greater Calgary | 14 | 66 | 11 | 9 | n/a | 0 | 3 |
| Greater Edmonton | 16 | 60 | 17 | 6 | n/a | 0 | 3 |
| Greater Toronto Area | 40 | 33 | 20 | 6 | n/a | 1 | 12 |
| National Capital Region | 27 | 40 | 19 | 7 | 7 | 1 | 5 |
| Greater Montreal | 20 | 17 | 11 | 5 | 47 | 1 | 12 |
| Rest of Canada | 24 | 37 | 23 | 5 | 10 | 1 | 58 |
Community size
| 1 Million plus | 31 | 25 | 19 | 5 | 19 | 1 | 27 |
| 500K to 1M | 20 | 46 | 18 | 6 | 8 | 1 | 18 |
| 100K to 500K | 30 | 31 | 28 | 5 | 6 | 0 | 14 |
| 10K to 100K | 24 | 38 | 22 | 5 | 10 | 1 | 21 |
| 1.5K to 10K | 22 | 41 | 19 | 5 | 11 | 2 | 15 |
| Under 1.5K | 19 | 43 | 18 | 5 | 13 | 1 | 4 |
Factor most influencing choice of vote
| The local candidate | 33 | 33 | 19 | 4 | 8 | 3 | 21 |
| The party leader | 27 | 37 | 21 | 1 | 13 | 0 | 17 |
| The party's stances on the issues | 23 | 36 | 21 | 7 | 13 | 1 | 61 |
Issue regarded as most important
| Healthcare | 27 | 23 | 33 | 3 | 13 | 1 | 15 |
| Corruption | 3 | 61 | 12 | 3 | 19 | 1 | 19 |
| Economy | 49 | 27 | 10 | 2 | 11 | 1 | 14 |
| Environment | 8 | 3 | 24 | 47 | 17 | 1 | 5 |
| Reducing taxes | 17 | 59 | 12 | 2 | 9 | 1 | 7 |
| Social programs | 27 | 13 | 45 | 2 | 12 | 1 | 11 |
| Abortion and/or gay marriage | 33 | 36 | 19 | 3 | 7 | 2 | 10 |
| Jobs | 24 | 27 | 16 | 2 | 23 | 1 | 4 |
| National Unity | 51 | 27 | 16 | 2 | 2 | 1 | 7 |
| US-Canada relationship | 14 | 71 | 6 | 3 | 4 | 1 | 1 |
| Crime | 15 | 66 | 12 | 4 | 2 | 1 | 5 |
| Immigration | 29 | 45 | 18 | 4 | 4 | 0 | 1 |
| The Atlantic Accord | 52 | 26 | 14 | 1 | 6 | 0 | 0 |
Abortion position
| Legal in all cases | 29 | 24 | 24 | 6 | 16 | 1 | 40 |
| Legal in most cases | 26 | 36 | 20 | 5 | 12 | 1 | 37 |
| Illegal in most cases | 17 | 58 | 15 | 4 | 5 | 1 | 13 |
| Illegal in all cases | 17 | 65 | 11 | 2 | 2 | 3 | 4 |
| Don't know | 25 | 42 | 20 | 5 | 6 | 2 | 6 |
Gun ownership
| Yes | 20 | 46 | 18 | 5 | 9 | 1 | 17 |
| No | 27 | 33 | 21 | 5 | 12 | 1 | 82 |
| Refused | 18 | 49 | 18 | 9 | 5 | 2 | 1 |
