= Results breakdown of the 2008 Canadian federal election =

Results of the 40th Canadian federal election

2008 Canadian federal election
← 2006	14 October 2008	2011 →
- Turnout: 58.8%
Party	Leader	Vote %	Seats	+/–
Conservative	Stephen Harper	37.65%	143	+16
Liberal	Stéphane Dion	26.26%	77	−18
Bloc Québécois	Gilles Duceppe	9.98%	49	+1
New Democratic	Jack Layton	17.48%	37	+7
Green	Elizabeth May	6.78%	0	−1
This lists parties that won seats. See the complete results below.
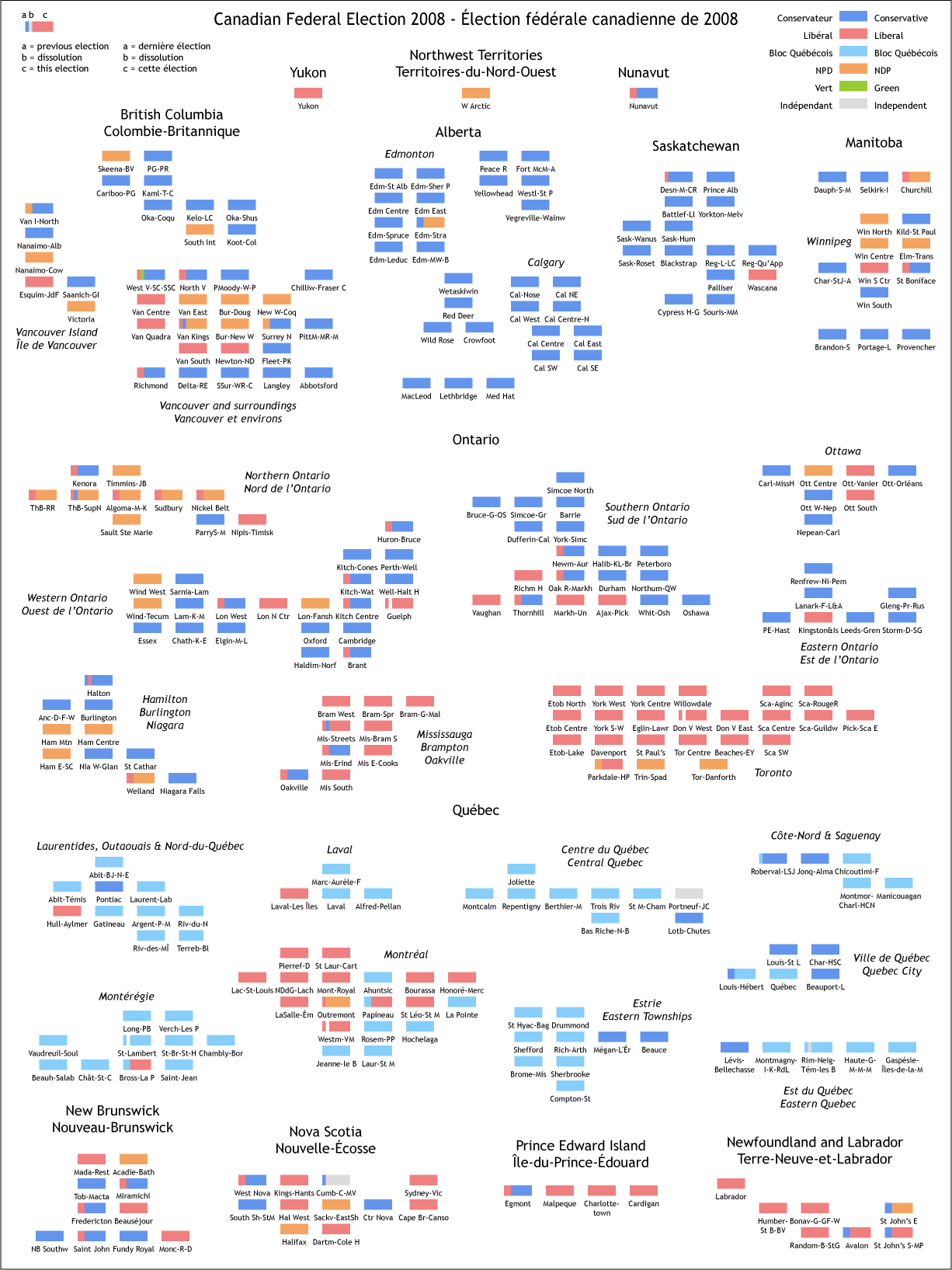
Analysis of results by riding, together with comparisons from previous election and at dissolution.
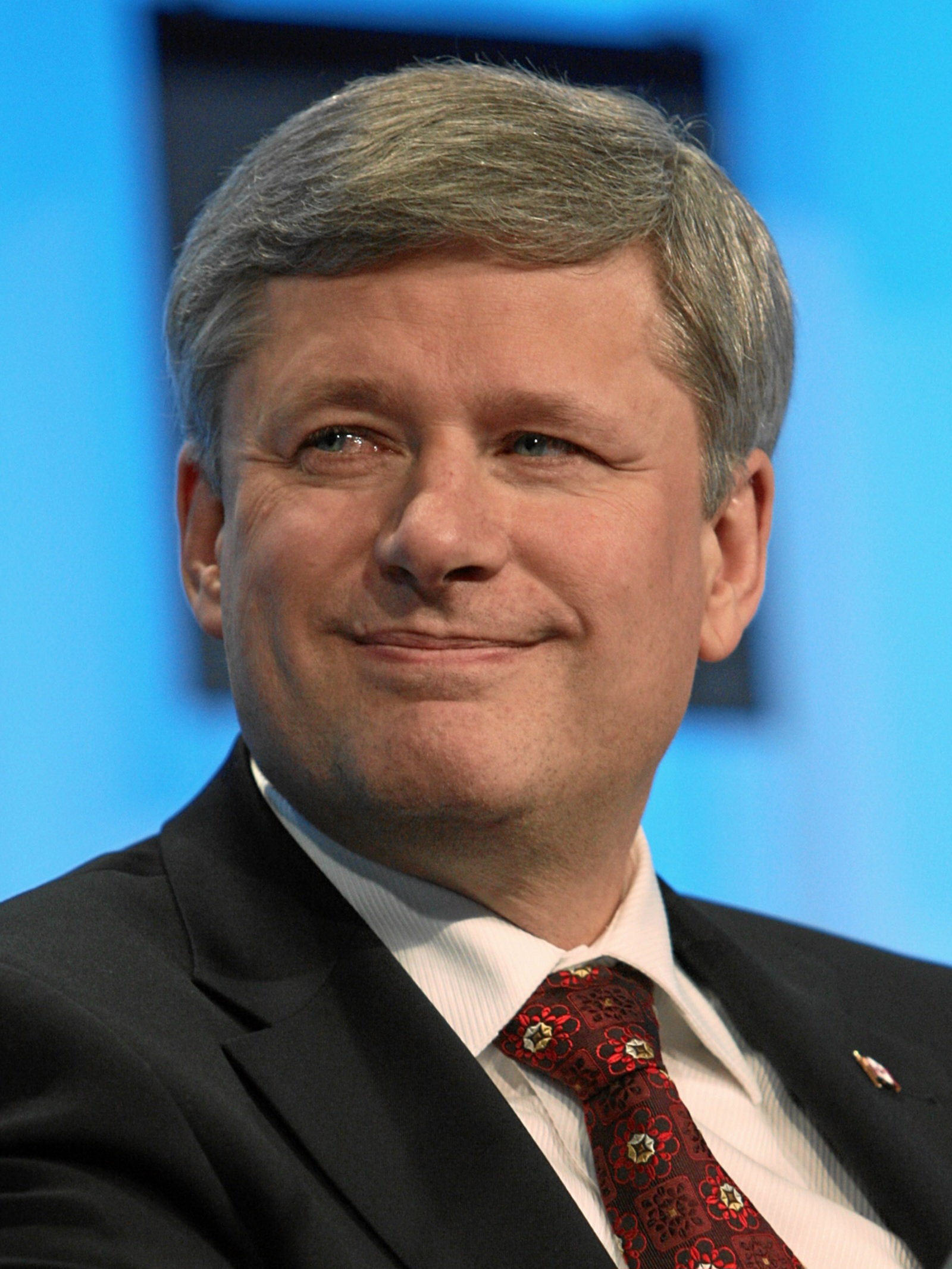

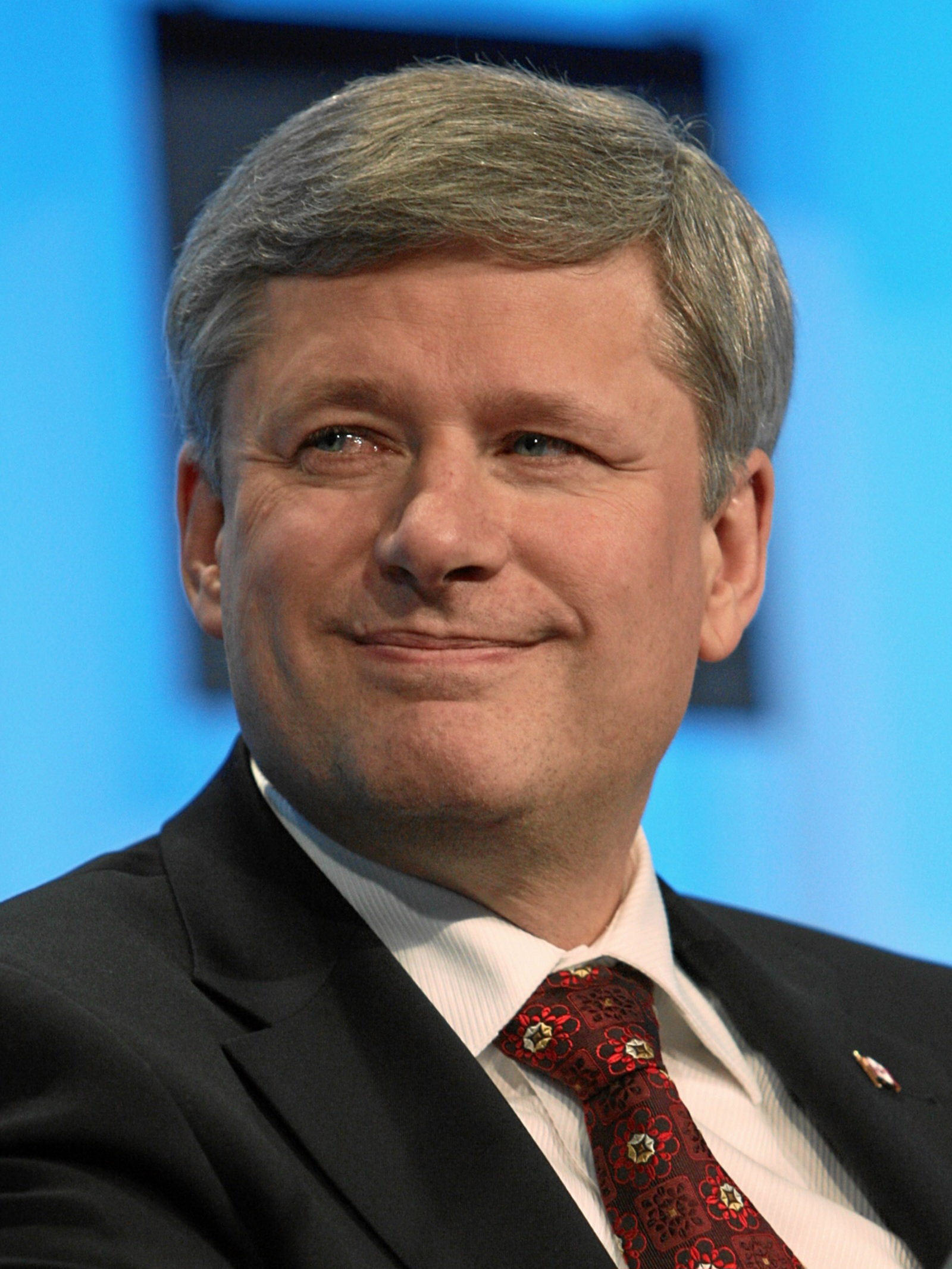
Prime Minister before	Prime Minister after
Stephen Harper; Conservative	Stephen Harper; Conservative

The 40th Canadian federal election was held on October 14, 2008.

The Conservative Party of Canada, led by Stephen Harper, won a minority government. The Conservatives won 143 seats. The Liberal Party of Canada, won 77 seats. The separatist Bloc Québécois won 49 seats and the social-democratic New Democratic Party won 37. Two independent candidates won a seat, one each in Nova Scotia and Quebec.

== Vote Total ==
Rendition of party representation in the 40th Canadian parliament decided by this election. Conservatives (143) Liberals (77) Bloc Québécois (49) New Democrats (37) Independent (2)

National Results
Party	Seats	Votes	%
Conservative	143	5,209,069	37.65
Liberal	77	3,633,185	26.26
Bloc Québécois	49	1,379,991	9.98
New Democratic	37	2,515,288	18.18
Independent	2	89,387	0.65
Green	0	937,613	6.78
Christian Heritage	0	26,475	0.191
Marxist–Leninist	0	8,565	0.062
Libertarian	0	7,300	0.053
Progressive Canadian	0	5,860	0.042
No Affiliation	0	5,457	0.039
Communist	0	3,572	0.026
Canadian Action	0	3,455	0.025
Marijuana	0	2,298	0.0166
Rhinoceros	0	2,122	0.0153
Newfoundland and Labrador First	0	1,713	0.0124
First Peoples National	0	1,611	0.0116
Animal Alliance	0	527	0.0038
Work Less	0	425	0.0031
Western Block	0	195	0.00141
People's Political Power	0	186	0.00134
Total		13,834,294	100.00%

== Vote and seat summaries ==
Popular vote
Conservative	37.6%
Liberal	26.2%
NDP	18.2%
Bloc Québécois	10%
Green	6.8%
Others	1.2%

Seat totals
Conservative	46.43%
Liberal	25%
Bloc Québécois	15.9%
NDP	12%
Independents	0.65%

== Gains and losses ==
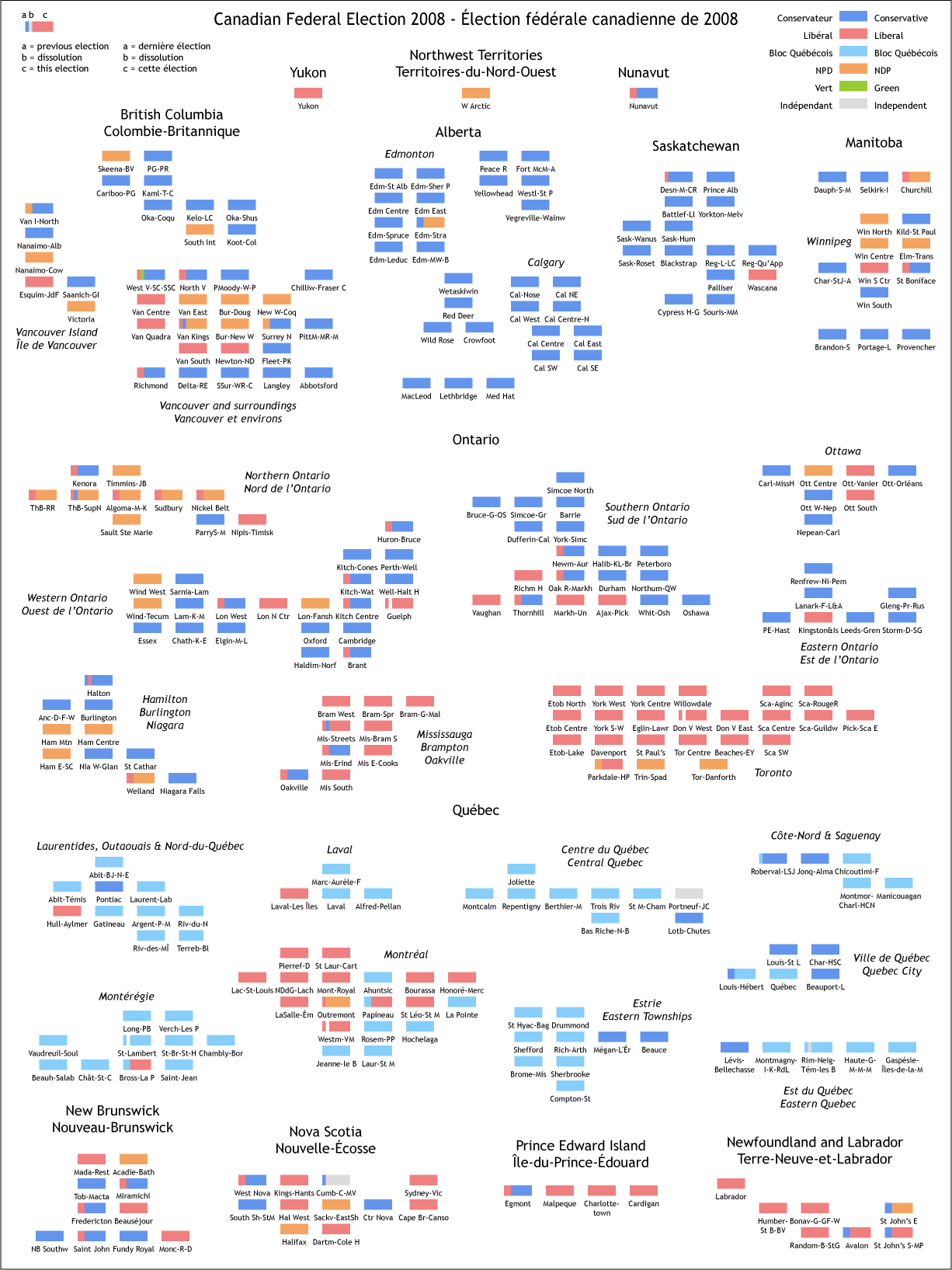
A visual representation of the seat changes occurring from 2006 to 2008.

Elections to the 40th Parliament of Canada – seats won/lost by party, 2006–2008
Party	2006	Gain from (loss to)										2008
Party	2006	Con		Lib		BQ		NDP		Ind		2008
Conservative	124			22	(2)	1	(1)	2	(2)		(1)	143
Liberal	103	2	(22)			2		1	(9)			77
Bloc Québécois	51	1	(1)		(2)							49
New Democratic	29	2	(2)	9	(1)							37
Independent	1	1										2
Total	308	6	(25)	31	(5)	3	(1)	3	(11)	–	(1)	308

The following seats changed allegiance from the 2006 election:

Conservative to Liberal

- Avalon
- St. John's South—Mount Pearl

Conservative to BQ

- Louis-Hébert

Conservative to NDP

- Edmonton—Strathcona
- St. John's East

Conservative to Independent

- Cumberland—Colchester—Musquodoboit Valley

Liberal to Conservative

- Brant
- Desnethé—Missinippi—Churchill River
- Egmont
- Fredericton
- Huron—Bruce
- Kenora
- Kitchener Centre
- Kitchener—Waterloo
- London West
- Miramichi
- Mississauga—Erindale
- Newmarket—Aurora
- North Vancouver
- Nunavut
- Oak Ridges—Markham
- Oakville
- Richmond
- Saint Boniface
- Saint John
- Thornhill
- West Nova
- West Vancouver—Sunshine Coast—Sea to Sky Country

Liberal to NDP

- Algoma—Manitoulin—Kapuskasing
- Churchill
- Nickel Belt
- Outremont
- Sudbury
- Thunder Bay—Rainy River
- Thunder Bay—Superior North
- Vancouver Kingsway
- Welland

BQ to Conservative

- Roberval—Lac-Saint-Jean

BQ to Liberal

- Brossard—La Prairie
- Papineau

NDP to Conservative

- Surrey North
- Vancouver Island North

NDP to Liberal

- Parkdale—High Park

== Results by electoral district ==
- All districts
- Newfoundland and Labrador
- Prince Edward Island
- Nova Scotia
- New Brunswick
- Quebec
- Ontario
- Manitoba
- Saskatchewan
- Alberta
- British Columbia
- Nunavut
- Northwest Territories
- Yukon

=== Results by province ===
Party name		BC	AB	SK	MB	ON	QC	NB	NS	PE	NL	NU	NT	YT	Total
Conservative	Seats:	22	27	13	9	51	10	6	3	1	0	1	-	-	143
Conservative	Vote:	44.4	64.6	53.7	48.8	39.2	21.7	39.4	26.1	36.2	16.5	34.8	37.6	32.8	37.6
Liberal	Seats:	5	-	1	1	38	14	3	5	3	6	-	-	1	77
Liberal	Vote:	19.3	11.4	14.9	19.1	33.8	23.7	32.4	29.8	47.7	46.6	34.8	13.6	45.3	26.2
Bloc Québécois	Seats:						49								49
Bloc Québécois	Vote:						38.1								10.0
New Democrat	Seats:	9	1	-	4	17	1	1	2	-	1	-	1	-	37
New Democrat	Vote:	25.0	12.7	25.6	24.0	18.2	12.2	21.9	28.9	9.8	33.9	27.6	41.5	9.0	18.2
Green	Vote:	9.4	8.8	5.6	6.8	8.0	3.5	6.2	8.0	4.7	1.7	8.4	5.5	13.0	6.8
Independent / No affiliation	Seats:						1		1						2
Independent / No affiliation	Vote:						0.6		6.6;						0.7
Total seats:		36	28	14	14	106	75	10	11	4	7	1	1	1	308

== Atlantic provinces ==
The Liberals won 17 seats in the Atlantic Provinces, the Conservatives ten, the NDP four, and Independent one. This is a swing of one seat from the Liberals to each of the other parties.

=== Newfoundland and Labrador ===
Buoyed by the so-called "ABC Campaign", spearheaded by popular Newfoundland and Labrador Premier Danny Williams, the Liberals won six seats and the NDP one. The Avalon and St. John's South—Mount Pearl seats changed hands from the Tories to the Liberals. The St. John's East seat changed from the Tories to NDP, as Norman Doyle retired. The change in Avalon was a crushing blow as the incumbent Fabian Manning was soundly defeated by the Liberals' Scott Andrews.

Results in Newfoundland and Labrador (Preliminary)
Party	Seats	Second	Third	Fourth	Fifth	Sixth	Votes	%	+/-
Liberal	6	1					91,025	46.75	+3.92
New Democratic	1	4	2				65,680	33.73	+20.16
Conservative		2	5				32,261	16.57	-26.13
Green				5	1		3,259	1.67	+0.77
Newfoundland and Labrador First				1	1	1	1,713	0.88	*
Progressive Canadian				1			578	0.30	*
Independent						1	179	0.09	*
Total							194,695	100%	

=== Prince Edward Island ===
The three Liberal incumbents have been re-elected. In the fourth riding, Egmont, incumbent Liberal Joe McGuire retired, and the seat went to the Tories.

Results in Prince Edward Island
Party	Seats	Second	Third	Fourth	Fifth	Votes	%	+/-
Liberal	3	1				35,372	47.67	
Conservative	1	3				26,877	36.22	
New Democratic			4			7,233	9.80	
Green				3	1	3,488	4.70	
Independent				1		1,101	1.5	
Christian Heritage					1	124	0.2	
Total						74,195	100%	

=== Nova Scotia ===
All incumbents were re-elected, except in Halifax where the retiring Alexa McDonough was replaced by another New Democrat, Megan Leslie, and in West Nova the incumbent Liberal Robert Thibault was defeated by Tory Greg Kerr. Elizabeth May of the Green Party was defeated in the riding of Central Nova, which was a battle between her and incumbent cabinet minister Peter MacKay.

Results in Nova Scotia
Party	Seats	Second	Third	Fourth	Fifth	Votes	%	+/-
Liberal	5	2	2	1		130,038	29.8	
Conservative	3	3	5			113,799	26.1	
New Democratic	2	5	4			126,127	28.9	
Independent	1				2	28,698	6.6	
Green		1		9		35,022	8.0	
Christian Heritage				1	4	1,946	0.5	
Canadian Action					1	196	0.0	
Marxist–Leninist					1	182	0.0	
Total						436,008	100%	

=== New Brunswick ===
The Liberal Green Shift was most unpopular in New Brunswick. Three ridings previously held by the Liberals switched to the Tories; Fredericton, Miramichi, and Saint John. In the other seven ridings the incumbent was re-elected.

Results in New Brunswick
Party	Seats	Second	Third	Fourth	Fifth	Votes	%	+/-
Conservative	6	3	1			145,132	39.4	
Liberal	3	6	1			119,197	32.4	
New Democratic	1	1	8			80,525	21.9	
Green				10		22,683	6.2	
Marijuana					1	330	0.1	
Canadian Action					1	168	0.1	
Total						368,035	100%	

== Quebec ==
The Bloc Québécois played obstruction in preventing the Conservatives from achieving a majority. Fifteen battleground ridings were in Quebec, with only three changing hands. The BQ lost the riding of Papineau to the Liberals, but gained the riding of Louis-Hébert from the Tories. A recent recount saw the Liberals take the riding of Brossard—La Prairie from the BQ, slightly strengthening their position.

Results in Quebec
Party	Seats	Votes	%	+/-
Bloc Québécois	49	1,379,565	38.1	
Liberal	14	859,634	23.7	
Conservative	10	784,560	21.7	
New Democratic	1	441,136	12.2	
Green	0	126,299	3.5	
Independent	1	23,106	0.6	
Marxist–Leninist	0	2,753	0.1	
neorhino.ca	0	2,263	0.0	–
Communist	0	393	0.0	
Christian Heritage	0	265	0.0	
Marijuana	0	183	0.0	
Total		3,620,362	100%	

== Ontario ==
Twenty battleground ridings were in Ontario alone, and the Conservatives took the ridings of Brant, Oakville, Huron—Bruce and Halton from the Liberals, where the NDP took Thunder Bay—Superior North, Thunder Bay—Rainy River, Algoma—Manitoulin—Kapuskasing, Sudbury and Nickel Belt from the Liberals. The Liberals themselves lost 16 seats in Ontario.

Results in Ontario (99.99% of polls)
Party	Seats	Votes	%	+/-
Conservative	51	2,019,362	39.2	+4.1
Liberal	38	1,741,200	33.8	-6.1
New Democratic	17	938,400	18.2	+1.2
Green	0	411,444	8.0	+3.4
Independent	0	13,029	0.3	+0.14
Christian Heritage	0	12,907	0.3	
Progressive Canadian	0	4,911	0.1	
Marxist–Leninist	0	3,556	0.1	
Libertarian	0	3,212	0.1	
Communist	0	1,508	0.0	
Marijuana	0	1,448	0.0	
Canadian Action	0	1,165	0.0	
First Peoples National	0	650	0.0	
Animal Alliance	0	529	0.0	
Total		5,153,321	100.0	

== Prairie provinces ==
=== Manitoba ===
Results in Manitoba
Party	Seats	Second	Third	Fourth	Fifth	Sixth	Seventh	Eighth	Votes	%	+/-
Conservative	9	4	1						228,051	48.8	
New Democratic	4	5	4	1					112,247	24	
Liberal	1	5	7	1					89,313	19.1	
Green			2	12					31,723	6.8	
Christian Heritage					10				4,189	0.9	
Independent						2	1		575	0.1	
Communist					1	1		1	394	0.1	
First Peoples National					1				212	0.0	
People's Political Power					2				185	0.0	
Total									466,889	100%	

=== Saskatchewan ===
All seats were retained by their incumbent parties. The closest race was Saskatoon—Rosetown—Biggar. There, the incumbent Carol Skelton did not seek reelection, giving the NDP high hopes that well-known farmers' activist Nettie Wiebe might re-establish a federal NDP presence in Parliament from the province. The seat was retained by Conservative Kelly Block in a close two-way race to keep the NDP shut out in Saskatchewan - despite the fact that their proportion of the popular vote there was in fact higher than any other province outside Atlantic Canada.

Results in Saskatchewan
Party	Seats	Second	Third	Fourth	Fifth	Sixth	Seventh	Votes	%	+/-
Conservative	13	1						224,927	53.7	
New Democratic		12	2					107,289	25.6	
Liberal	1	1	10	2				62,209	14.9	
Green			2	12				23,279	5.6	
Christian Heritage					1	1		479	0.0	
First Peoples National					1			282	0.0	
Canadian Action					1			169	0.0	
Independent					1			134	0.0	
Libertarian							1	74	0.0	
Total								418,842	100%	

=== Alberta ===
Arguably the Conservatives' power base, Alberta's Tory incumbents were all re-elected except for the riding of Edmonton—Strathcona, which the NDP narrowly took that riding with 442 votes.

Results in Alberta
Party	Seats	Second	Third	Fourth	Fifth	Sixth	Seventh	Votes	%	+/-
Conservative	27	1						820,855	64.6	
New Democratic	1	14	7	6				161,409	12.7	
Liberal		8	9	11				144,364	11.4	
Green		4	11	11	2			111,505	8.8	
Independent		1			4	1		19,995	1.6	
No affiliation			1					4,837	0.4	
Christian Heritage					4	1	2	3,434	0.3	
Libertarian					3	1		1,184	0.1	
Canadian Action					2	1		1,051	0.1	
Marxist–Leninist					2	3		907	0.1	
Communist					2			509	0.0	
First Peoples National						1		244	0.0	
Total								1,270,294	100.0	

== British Columbia ==
The Conservatives regained the seats lost in the 2006 election and held on to seven of the ten battleground ridings. They took the ridings of West Vancouver—Sunshine Coast—Sea to Sky Country from the Greens and Richmond from the Liberals.

Results in British Columbia
Party	Seats	Votes	%	+/-
Conservative	22	796,757	44.4	
New Democratic	9	467,335	26.1	
Liberal	5	346,795	19.3	
Green	0	168,723	9.4	
Christian Heritage	0	3,378	0.2	
Independent	0	3,123	0.0	
Libertarian	0	2,912	0.2	
Marxist–Leninist	0	1,355	0.0	
Communist	0	835	0.0	
Canadian Action	0	759	0.0	
Progressive Canadian	0	425	0.0	
Work Less	0	423	0.0	
Marijuana	0	358	0.0	
Western Block	0	195	0.0	
Total		1,793,373	100%	

== Territories ==
Liberal candidate in the Yukon and the NDP candidate in Western Arctic (the Northwest Territories) won re-election.

However, in Nunavut the Liberal candidate Kirt Ejesiak was defeated by Conservative Leona Aglukkaq to give the modern Conservatives their first elected member from the territories.

Results in Nunavut
Party	Seats	Votes	%	+/-
Conservative	1	2,815	34.9	
Liberal	0	2,349	29.1	
New Democratic	0	2,228	27.6	
Green	0	669	8.3	
Total		8,068	100%	

Results in the Northwest Territories
Party	Seats	Votes	%	+/-
New Democratic	1	5,669	41.4	
Conservative	0	5,146	37.6	
Liberal	0	1,858	13.6	
Green	0	752	5.5	
First Peoples National	0	252	1.8	
Total		13,677	100%	

Results in the Yukon
Party	Seats	Votes	%	+/-
Liberal	1	6,715	45.8	
Conservative	0	4,788	32.7	
Green	0	1,881	12.8	
New Democratic	0	1,276	8.7	
Total		14,511	100%	

== Incumbent MPs defeated ==
=== Conservative gains ===
- Omar Alghabra, incumbent Liberal MP for Mississauga—Erindale was defeated by Conservative candidate Bob Dechert.
- Catherine Bell, incumbent New Democrat MP for Vancouver Island North was defeated by Conservative candidate John Duncan.
- Bonnie Brown, incumbent Liberal MP for Oakville was defeated by Conservative candidate Terence Young.
- Charles Hubbard, incumbent Liberal MP for Mirmachi was defeated by Conservative candidate Tilly O'Neill-Gordon.
- Susan Kadis, incumbent Liberal MP for Thornhill was defeated by Conservative Candidate Peter Kent.
- Karen Redman, incumbent Liberal MP for Kitchener Centre was defeated by Conservative candidate Stephen Woodworth.
- Lloyd St. Amand, incumbent Liberal MP for Brant was defeated by Conservative Candidate Phil McColeman.
- Andrew Telegdi, incumbent Liberal MP for Kitchener—Waterloo was defeated by Conservative candidate Peter Braid by 73 votes. The automatic recount on October 17, 2008 found that Braid won by only 17 votes.
- Lui Temelkovski, incumbent Liberal MP for Oak Ridges—Markham was defeated by Conservative Candidate Paul Calandra.
- Garth Turner, incumbent Liberal MP for Halton was defeated by Conservative candidate Lisa Raitt.
- Paul Zed, incumbent Liberal MP for Saint John was defeated by Conservative candidate Rodney Weston.
- Blair Wilson, incumbent Green MP for West Vancouver—Sunshine Coast—Sea to Sky Country was defeated by Conservative candidate John Weston
- Raymond Chan, incumbent Liberal MP for Richmond was defeated by Conservative candidate Alice Wong.

=== Liberal gains ===
- Vivian Barbot, incumbent Bloc Québécois MP for Papineau was defeated by Liberal candidate Justin Trudeau.
- Wajid Khan, incumbent Conservative MP for Mississauga—Streetsville was defeated by Liberal candidate Bonnie Crombie
- Marcel Lussier, incumbent Bloc Québécois MP for Brossard—La Prairie was defeated by Liberal candidate Alexandra Mendès.
- Peggy Nash, incumbent New Democrat MP for Parkdale—High Park was defeated by Liberal candidate Gerard Kennedy
- Fabian Manning, incumbent Conservative MP for Avalon was defeated by Liberal candidate Scott Andrews.

=== NDP gains ===
- Ken Boshcoff, incumbent Liberal MP for Thunder Bay—Rainy River was defeated by New Democrat candidate John Rafferty.
- Rahim Jaffer, incumbent Conservative MP for Edmonton—Strathcona, was defeated by New Democrat candidate Linda Duncan.
- Tina Keeper, incumbent Liberal MP for Churchill was defeated by New Democrat candidate Niki Ashton.
- Diane Marleau, incumbent Liberal MP for Sudbury was defeated by New Democrat candidate Glenn Thibeault.
- John Maloney, incumbent Liberal MP for Welland was defeated by New Democrat candidate Malcolm Allen.
- Brent St. Denis, incumbent Liberal MP for Algoma—Manitoulin—Kapuskasing was defeated by New Democrat candidate Carol Hughes.

=== Bloc Québécois gains ===
- Luc Harvey, incumbent Conservative MP for Louis-Hébert was defeated by Bloc Québécois candidate Pascal-Pierre Paillé
- Louise Thibault, incumbent Independent MP for Rimouski-Neigette—Témiscouata—Les Basques was defeated by Bloc Québécois Claude Guimond

== Open seat gains ==
=== Conservatives ===
- Leona Aglukkaq, Conservative candidate defeats Liberal candidate Kirt Ejesiak in Nunavut. The seat was vacated by incumbent Liberal MP Nancy Karetak-Lindell.
- Keith Ashfield, Conservative candidate defeats Liberal candidate David Innes in Fredericton. The seat was vacated by incumbent Liberal MP Andy Scott.
- Gail Shea, Conservative candidate defeats Liberal candidate Keith Milligan in Egmont. The seat was vacated by incumbent Liberal MP Joe McGuire.

=== Liberals ===
- Siobhan Coady, Liberal candidate defeats Conservative candidate Merv Wiseman in St. John's South—Mount Pearl. The seat was vacated by incumbent Conservative MP Loyola Hearn.

=== New Democrats ===
- Don Davies won the district of Vancouver Kingsway, vacated by Conservative MP David Emerson.
- Claude Gravelle won the district of Nickel Belt, vacated by Liberal MP Raymond Bonin.
- Jack Harris was elected in St. John's East, vacated by Conservative MP Norman Doyle.
- Bruce Hyer won the district of Thunder Bay—Superior North, vacated by Conservative MP Joe Comuzzi.

== Defeated cabinet ministers and party leaders ==
- Michael Fortier (Minister of International Trade) - Defeated in Vaudreuil-Soulanges by Bloc Québécois incumbent Meili Faille
- Elizabeth May (Leader - Green Party of Canada) - Defeated in Central Nova by Conservative incumbent Peter MacKay

== Popular vote by province ==
Party	Alberta		British Columbia		Manitoba		New Brunswick		Newfoundland and Labrador		Northwest Territories		Nova Scotia		Nunavut		Ontario		Prince Edward Island		Quebec		Saskatchewan		Yukon		Total	
Party	Votes	%	Votes	%	Votes	%	Votes	%	Votes	%	Votes	%	Votes	%	Votes	%	Votes	%	Votes	%	Votes	%	Votes	%	Votes	%	Votes	%
Conservative	820,855	64.6%	796,757	44.4%	228,051	48.8%	145,132	39.4%	32,304	16.5%	5,146	37,6%	113,799	26.1%	2,806	34.8%	2,019,362	39.2%	26,877	36.2%	784,560	21.7%	224,927	53.7%	4,758	32.8%	5,205,334	37.6%
Liberal	144,364	11.4%	346,795	19.3%	89,313	19.1%	119,197	32.4%	91,084	46.6%	1,858	13.6%	139,038	29.8%	2,359	29.2%	1,741,200	33.8%	35,372	47.7%	859,634	23.7%	62,209	14.9%	6,567	45.3%	3,629,990	26.2%
Bloc Québécois	n/a	n/a	n/a	n/a	n/a	n/a	n/a	n/a	n/a	n/a	n/a	n/a	n/a	n/a	n/a	n/a	n/a	n/a	n/a	n/a	1,379,565	38.1%	n/a	n/a	n/a	n/a	1,379,565	10.0%
New Democratic	161,409	12.7%	467,335	26.1%	112,247	24.0%	80,525	21.9%	66,171	33.9%	5,669	41.5%	126,127	28.9%	2,228	27.6%	938,400	18.2%	7,233	9.8%	441,136	12.2%	107,289	25.6%	1,306	9.0%	2,517,075	18.2%
Green	111,505	8.8%	168,723	9.4%	31,723	6.8%	22,683	6.2%	3,274	1,7%	752	5.5%	35,022	8.0%	675	8.4%	411,444	8.0%	3,488	4.7%	126,299	3.5%	23,279	5.6%	1,880	13.0%	940,747	6.8%
Independents and no affiliation	19,995	1.6%	2,707	0.2%	575	0.1%	n/a	n/a	179	0.1%	n/a	n/a	28,698	6.6%	n/a	n/a	13,029	0.3%	1,101	1.5%	23,106	0.6%	134	0.0%	n/a	n/a	89,524	0.7%
Christian Heritage	3,434	0.3%	3,378	0.2%	4,189	0.9%	n/a	n/a	n/a	n/a	n/a	n/a	1,946	0.5%	n/a	n/a	12,907	0.3%	124	0.2%	265	0.0%	0.1%	479	n/a	n/a	26,722	0.2%
Marxist–Leninist	907	0.1%	1,355	0.1%	n/a	n/a	n/a	n/a	n/a	n/a	n/a	n/a	182	0.0%	n/a	n/a	3,556	0.1%	n/a	n/a	2753	0.1%	n/a	n/a	n/a	n/a	8,753	0.1%
Libertarian	1,184	0.1%	2,912	0.2%	n/a	n/a	n/a	n/a	n/a	n/a	n/a	n/a	n/a	n/a	n/a	n/a	3,212	0.1%	n/a	n/a	n/a	n/a	74	0.0%	n/a	n/a	7,382	0.1%
Progressive Canadian	n/a	n/a	425	0.0%	n/a	n/a	n/a	n/a	584	0.3%	n/a	n/a	n/a	n/a	n/a	n/a	4,911	0.1%	n/a	n/a	n/a	n/a	n/a	n/a	n/a	n/a	5,920	0.0%
Communist	509	0.0%	835	0.1%	394	0.1%	n/a	n/a	n/a	n/a	n/a	n/a	n/a	n/a	n/a	n/a	1.508	0.0%	n/a	n/a	393	0.0%	n/a	n/a	n/a	n/a	3,639	0.0%
Canadian Action	1,051	0.1%	759	0.0%	n/a	n/a	168	0.1%	n/a	n/a	n/a	n/a	196	0.0%	n/a	n/a	1,165	0.0%	n/a	n/a	n/a	n/a	169	0.0%	n/a	n/a	3,508	0.0%
Marijuana	n/a	n/a	358	0.0%	n/a	n/a	330	0.1%	n/a	n/a	n/a	n/a	n/a	n/a	n/a	n/a	1,448	0.0%	n/a	n/a	183	0.0%	n/a	n/a	n/a	n/a	2,319	0.0%
neorhino.ca	n/a	n/a	n/a	n/a	n/a	n/a	n/a	n/a	n/a	n/a	n/a	n/a	n/a	n/a	n/a	n/a	n/a	n/a	n/a	n/a	2,263	0.1%	n/a	n/a	n/a	n/a	2,263	0.0%
Newfoundland and Labrador First	n/a	n/a	n/a	n/a	n/a	n/a	n/a	n/a	1,801	0.9%	n/a	n/a	n/a	n/a	n/a	n/a	n/a	n/a	n/a	n/a	n/a	n/a	n/a	n/a	n/a	n/a	1,801	0.0%
First Peoples National	n/a	n/a	n/a	n/a	212	0.1%	n/a	n/a	n/a	n/a	252	1.8%	n/a	n/a	n/a	n/a	n/a	n/a	n/a	n/a	n/a	n/a	282	0.1%	n/a	n/a	1,640	0.0%
Animal Alliance	n/a	n/a	n/a	n/a	n/a	n/a	n/a	n/a	n/a	n/a	n/a	n/a	n/a	n/a	n/a	n/a	529	0.0%	n/a	n/a	n/a	n/a	n/a	n/a	n/a	n/a	529	0.0%
Work Less	n/a	n/a	423	0.0%	n/a	n/a	n/a	n/a	n/a	n/a	n/a	n/a	n/a	n/a	n/a	n/a	n/a	n/a	n/a	n/a	n/a	n/a	n/a	n/a	n/a	n/a	423	0.0%
Western Block	n/a	n/a	195	0.0%	n/a	n/a	n/a	n/a	n/a	n/a	n/a	n/a	n/a	n/a	n/a	n/a	n/a	n/a	n/a	n/a	n/a	n/a	n/a	n/a	n/a	n/a	195	0.0%
People's Political Power	n/a	n/a	n/a	n/a	185	0.0%	n/a	n/a	n/a	n/a	n/a	n/a	n/a	n/a	n/a	n/a	n/a	n/a	n/a	n/a	n/a	n/a	n/a	n/a	n/a	n/a	185	0.0%
Total	1,270,294	-	1,793,373	-	466,889	-	368,035	-	195,397	-	13,677	-	43,008	-	8,068	-	5,153,321	-	74,195	-	3,620,362	-	418,842	-	14,511	-	13,832,972	-
Sources: Elections Canada

=== Voter turnout ===
Voter turnout was the lowest in Canadian election history, as 59.1% of the electorate cast a ballot. All federally funded parties except for the Greens attracted fewer total votes than in 2006; the Greens received nearly 280,000 more votes this election. The Conservatives lost 167,494 votes, the Liberals 850,000, the Bloc 200,000 and the NDP 70,000.

Region	Turnout (%)
Alberta	52.9
British Columbia	61.0
Manitoba	56.8
New Brunswick	62.8
Newfoundland and Labrador	48.1
Northwest Territories	48.6
Nova Scotia	60.7
Nunavut	49.4
Ontario	59.1
Prince Edward Island	69.5
Saskatchewan	59.4
Quebec	61.1
Yukon	63.7

== See also ==
- Results by riding for the Canadian federal election, 2008
- List of Canadian federal electoral districts
