= Results breakdown of the 2004 Canadian federal election =

2004 Canadian federal election

== Results by province and territory ==
=== Alberta ===
Results in Alberta
Party	Seats	Second	Third	Fourth	Fifth	Sixth	Seventh	Eighth	Votes	%	+/-
Conservative	26	2							786,271	61.67	
Liberals	2	26							280,185	21.98	
NDP			24	4					121,560	9.53	
Green			4	24					78,146	6.13	
Marijuana					4	1			2,736	0.21	
Christian Heritage					3	1			2,567	0.2	
Canadian Action					5				1,643	0.13	
Independent					1		1		601	0.05	
Progressive Canadian						1			456	0.04	
Marxist-Leninist						3		1	452	0.04	
Communist					2				380	0.03	
Total	28								1,274,997	100.0	

=== British Columbia ===
Results in British Columbia
Party	Seats	Second	Third	Fourth	Fifth	Sixth	Seventh	Eighth	Ninth	Votes	%	+/-
Conservative	22	6	7	1						628,999	36.29	
Liberals	8	15	13							494,992	28.56	
NDP	5	15	16							460,435	26.56	
Green				34	2					109,861	6.34	
No affiliation to a recognised party	1				2	1	1	2		17,185	0.99	
Christian Heritage				1	4	3				5,141	0.3	
Independent					6	2				4,885	0.28	
Canadian Action					9	6	4	1	1	4,557	0.26	
Marijuana					5	3				3,844	0.22	
Marxist-Leninist					2	5	4	3		1,345	0.08	
Libertarian					3	1	1			1,170	0.07	
Communist					1	2	4	1		946	0.05	
Total	36									1,733,360	100.0	

=== Manitoba ===
Results in Manitoba
Party	Seats	Second	Third	Fourth	Fifth	Sixth	Seventh	Votes	%	+/-
Conservative	7	4	3					185,566	39.1	
Liberals	3	8	3					157,492	33.19	
NDP	4	2	8					111,507	23.5	
Green				13	1			12,960	2.73	
Christian Heritage				1	7	1		4,201	0.89	
Marijuana					4	2		1,894	0.4	
Communist						5	3	741	0.16	
Canadian Action						1		114	0.02	
Independent							1	92	0.02	
Total	14							474,567	100.0	

=== New Brunswick ===
Results in New Brunswick
Party	Seats	Second	Third	Fourth	Fifth	Sixth	Votes	%	+/-
Liberals	7	3					165,111	44.63	
Conservative	2	6	2				115,021	31.09	
NDP	1	1	8				76,234	20.6	
Green				10			12,407	3.35	
Independent					1	1	648	0.18	
Marijuana					1		369	0.1	
Canadian Action					1		194	0.05	
Total	10						369,984	100.0	

=== Newfoundland and Labrador ===
Results in Newfoundland and Labrador
Party	Seats	Second	Third	Fourth	Fifth	Votes	%	+/-
Liberals	5	2				95,254	47.99	
Conservative	2	4	1			64,158	32.32	
NDP		1	5	1		34,700	17.48	
Green				6	1	3,117	1.57	
Independent			1		1	1,263	0.64	
Total	7					198,492	100.0	

=== Northwest Territories ===
Results in Northwest Territories
Party	Seats	Second	Third	Fourth	Votes	%	+/-
Liberals	1				5,317	39.45	
NDP		1			5,264	39.06	
Conservative			1		2,314	17.17	
Green				1	583	4.33	
Total	1				13,478	100.0	

=== Nova Scotia ===
Results in Nova Scotia
Party	Seats	Second	Third	Fourth	Fifth	Sixth	Votes	%	+/-
Liberals	6	4	1				173,641	39.66	
NDP	2	5	4				124,371	28.41	
Conservative	3	2	6				122,594	28	
Green				11			14,235	3.25	
Progressive Canadian					3		1,459	0.33	
Independent						2	506	0.12	
Christian Heritage					1		493	0.11	
Marijuana					1		474	0.11	
Marxist-Leninist						1	70	0.02	
Total	11						437,843	100.0	

=== Nunavut ===
Results in Nunavut
Party	Seats	Second	Third	Fourth	Fifth	Votes	%	+/-
Liberals	1					3,818	51.3	
Independent		1				1,172	15.75	
NDP			1			1,129	15.17	
Conservative				1		1,075	14.45	
Green					1	248	3.33	
Total	1					7,442	100.0	

=== Ontario ===
Results in Ontario
Party	Seats	Second	Third	Fourth	Fifth	Sixth	Seventh	Eighth	Ninth	Votes	%	+/-
Liberals	75	30	1							2,278,875	44.68	
Conservative	24	57	25							1,607,337	31.51	
NDP	7	18	79	2						921,240	18.06	
Green			1	101	4					226,812	4.45	
Christian Heritage				2	27	3				26,098	0.51	
Independent		1			7	13	4	1		14,643	0.29	
Progressive Canadian				1	10	1				8,957	0.18	
Marijuana					14	4				8,615	0.17	
Marxist-Leninist					14	9	7	3	1	3,693	0.07	
Canadian Action					4	6	3	3		2,215	0.04	
Communist					4	4	2			1,291	0.03	
Libertarian					1		1			614	0.01	
No affiliation to a recognised party								1		89	0	
Total	106									5,100,479	100.0	

=== Prince Edward Island ===
Results in Prince Edward Island
Party	Seats	Second	Third	Fourth	Fifth	Votes	%	+/-
Liberals	4					40,241	52.54	
Conservative		4				23,499	30.68	
NDP			4			9,566	12.49	
Green				4		3,184	4.16	
Christian Heritage					1	105	0.14	
Total	4					76,595	100.0	

=== Quebec ===
Results in Quebec
Party	Seats	Second	Third	Fourth	Fifth	Sixth	Seventh	Eighth	Ninth	Votes	%	+/-
Bloc Québécois	54	19	2							1,680,109	48.87	
Liberals	21	52	2							1,165,645	33.9	
Conservative		4	57	12	2					301,539	8.77	
NDP			13	42	20					158,427	4.61	
Green				21	53	1				108,660	3.16	
Marijuana						31				15,045	0.44	
Independent			1			2	2	1		4,175	0.12	
Marxist-Leninist						5	15	2	1	3,136	0.09	
Communist						2	3	1	1	1,068	0.03	
Christian Heritage						1				202	0.01	
Libertarian							1			165	0	
Canadian Action								1		84	0	
Total	75									3,438,255	100.0	

=== Saskatchewan ===
Results in Saskatchewan
Party	Seats	Second	Third	Fourth	Fifth	Sixth	Votes	%	+/-
Conservative	13	1					178,507	41.84	
Liberals	1	5	8				115,925	27.17	
NDP		7	6	1			99,754	23.38	
Independent		1		3	1		19,428	4.55	
Green				10	4		11,463	2.69	
Christian Heritage					4	1	1,428	0.33	
No affiliation to a recognised party						2	177	0.04	
Total	14						426,682	100.0	

=== Yukon ===
Results in Yukon
Party	Seats	Second	Third	Fourth	Fifth	Sixth	Votes	%	+/-
Liberals	1						5,724	45.69	
NDP		1					3,216	25.67	
Conservative			1				2,618	20.9	
Green				1			571	4.56	
Marijuana					1		299	2.39	
Christian Heritage						1	100	0.8	
Total	1						12,528	100.0	
