= Endorsements in the 2006 Canadian federal election =

The following organizations, individuals, and media outlets (including newspapers) have endorsed parties and or candidates in the 2006 Canadian federal election:

== Endorsements by party ==
| Endorsing the Liberals |

| Person or organization | Notes |
|---|---|
| Bob Chiarelli | Endorsed candidate Richard Mahoney in Ottawa Centre |
| Federation of Canadian Municipalities | President Gloria Kovach stated that the Liberals went the farthest in meeting the "infrastructure challenges faced by our cities and communities" |
| Dalton McGuinty | Says that "Prime Minister Martin remains the best choice for the people of Ontario." |
| David Miller | Endorsing Liberal candidate John Godfrey in Don Valley West |
| National Métis Council | President Clement Chartier said "We feel we have to do everything we can to ensure that there is a Liberal government." |
| David Orchard | Said Conservatives are a threat to national unity |
| Margo Timmins | Endorsing candidate Sam Bulte in Parkdale—High Park |
| Toronto Star | Stated that the Liberals "best understands Canada's needs and has the more credible program to address those needs." |
| Buzz Hargrove | Endorsed Belinda Stronach in Newmarket—Aurora and called for voters to support the Liberals in a number of ridings. |
| Kyle Rae | Endorsed Bill Graham in Toronto Centre. |

| Endorsing the Conservatives |

| Person or organization | Notes |
|---|---|
Pat Binns, John Hamm, Bernard Lord
| Calgary Herald | |
| Congress of Aboriginal Peoples | Chief Dwight Dorey said "The Conservative Party is the only party with a plan to help Aboriginal Canadians" |
| Rob Davis, former Toronto City Councillor and TTC vice-chairman | Endorsing candidate Lewis Reford in Toronto Centre |
| Mario Dumont | Said that he feels "the Bloc Québécois is becoming a millstone around the province's neck" |
| The Globe and Mail | Stated that "we have concluded that the time has arrived for a change of government in Canada." |
| David Kilgour, former Liberal MP | Endorsing candidates Tenzin Khangsar and Steven Fletcher. |
| La Presse | Stated that "In the last two years, the Liberals have become ossified" |
| Montreal Gazette | |
| National Post | Stated that "This country needs new leadership and Mr. Harper is the man to provide it."] |
| The Province (Vancouver) | |
| John Tory and Bill Davis | Endorsing Candidate Jim Flaherty in Whitby—Oshawa |
| David Asper co-owner of Canwest Global | Endorsed Peter Kent in St. Paul's and appeared on stage with Tory leader Stephen Harper at a Toronto Conservative Party rally. |
| Ron Chyczij, former President of the Etobicoke-Lakeshore Federal Liberal Association | Endorsing John Capobianco in Etobicoke-Lakeshore |

| Endorsing the New Democratic Party |

| Person or organization | Notes |
|---|---|
| Barenaked Ladies | "Have long backed Layton" |
| Dona Cadman (widow of Chuck Cadman) | Endorsing candidate Penny Priddy in Surrey North. She ran for the Conservatives in 2008. |
| Canadian Employment and Immigration Union | Endorsing various candidates including Sid Ryan, Jack Layton, Olivia Chow and Marilyn Churley. |
| Shirley Douglas | In support of medicare. |
| Canadian Labour Congress | Is organisationally linked with the NDP |
| Sarah Harmer | Endorsing candidate Marilyn Churley in Beaches—East York |
| Stephen Lewis and June Callwood | Support candidate Peggy Nash in Parkdale—High Park |
| David Miller | Endorsing candidate Peggy Nash. |
| David Suzuki | Testimonials used in campaign material for Churley and Vancouver Centre candidate Svend Robinson. |
| Rafe Mair | "If I were in Vancouver Centre I would be voting for Svend Robinson…I hope he wins … because it is a Parliament that looks into corners it wouldn’t otherwise look in without guys like Svend there" |
| Muslim Canadian Congress | "As far as the Liberal Party is concerned, for too long it has taken our communities for granted; it is time for the traditional leadership of Canada's Muslim communities to cut their ties with the tainted record of the Federal Liberal Party and demonstrate solidarity with Jack Layton and his New Democrats" |

| Endorsing the Bloc Québécois |

| Person or organization | Notes |
|---|---|
| Quebec Federation of Labour | Is "urging members to vote Bloc" |
| Various community groups from Algeria, Tunisia, Morocco, and Bangladesh | Endorsing candidate Vivian Barbot in Papineau |

| Endorsing the Greens |

| Person or organization | Notes |
|---|---|
| Ottawa Citizen | Endorsing David Chernushenko in Ottawa Centre |

== See also ==
- Newspaper endorsements in the Canadian federal election, 2006

== Sources ==
- CBC: "Canada Votes" Endorsements
