= Jessie Sunner =

Canadian politician

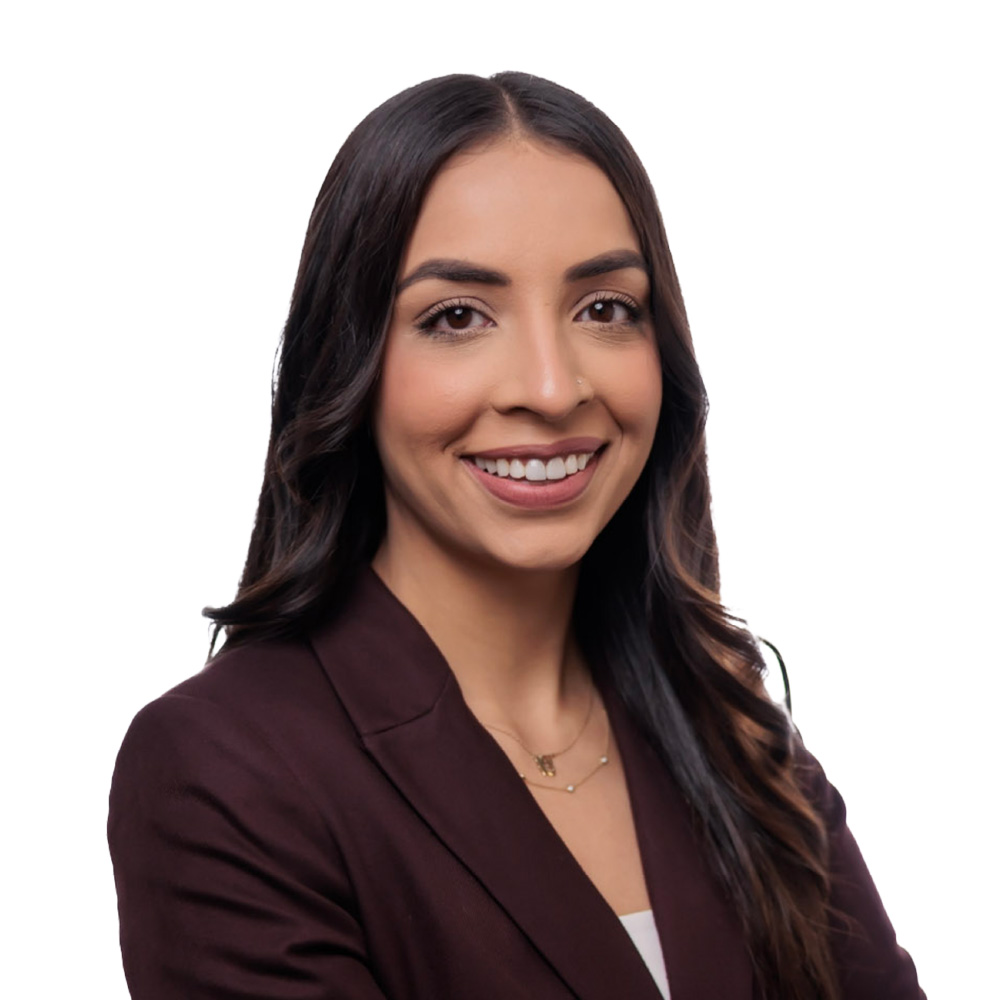
- Campaign portrait, 2024

Minister of Post-Secondary Education and Future Skills of British Columbia
- In office July 17, 2025 – November 20, 2026
- Premier: David Eby
- Preceded by: Anne Kang

Parliamentary Secretary for Anti-Racism Initiatives of British Columbia
- In office November 18, 2024 – July 17, 2025
- Premier: David Eby
- Preceded by: Mable Elmore
- Succeeded by: Amna Shah

Member of the Legislative Assembly of British Columbia for Surrey-Newton
- In office October 19, 2024 – October 24, 2026
- Preceded by: Harry Bains
- Succeeded by: Harj Dhaliwal

Personal details
- Party: New Democratic Party of British Columbia
- Occupation: Trade unionist, lawyer

Jessie Sunner is a Canadian lawyer and politician who was elected to the Legislative Assembly of British Columbia in the 2024 general election. She represented the electoral district of Surrey-Newton as a member of the British Columbia New Democratic Party.

== Early life and career ==
Sunner grew up in Surrey, British Columbia. Her parents are Punjabi immigrants.

Sunner previously worked as a human rights lawyer and trade unionist for the Hospital Employees' Union. She is the vice-president of the Surrey Women's Centre, and has sat on the boards of several other organizations, including the South Asian Bar Association and the BC College of Social Workers.

Following Sunner's election in 2024, she was named the Parliamentary Secretary for Anti-Racism Initiatives. In a cabinet reshuffle in July 2025, Sunner was given the title of Minister of Post-Secondary Education and Future Skills.

== Electoral record ==
2026 British Columbia general election: Surrey-Newton
Party	Candidate	Votes	%	±%	Expenditures
Conservative	Harj Dhaliwal	8,003	54.53		
New Democratic	Jessie Sunner	5,924	40.36		
CentreBC	Harman Preet Singh	698	4.76	—	
Total valid votes		14,625	99.65		
Total rejected ballots		52	0.35		
Turnout		14,677			
Registered voters					
Conservative gain from New Democratic		Swing		+10.98	
Source: Elections BC

2024 British Columbia general election: Surrey-Newton
Party	Candidate	Votes	%	±%	Expenditures
New Democratic	Jessie Sunner	7,924	51.2%	−11.2	
Conservative	Tegjot Bal	6,658	43.0%		
Freedom	Amrit Birring	371	2.4%		
Unaffiliated	Japreet Lehal	344	2.2%		
Independent	Joginder Singh Randhawa	189	1.2%		
Total valid votes		15,486	–		
Total rejected ballots					
Turnout					
Registered voters					
Source: Elections BC

== See also ==
- 43rd Parliament of British Columbia
