= Dona Cadman =

Canadian politician

Member of Parliament for Surrey North
- In office October 14, 2008 – May 2, 2011
- Preceded by: Penny Priddy
- Succeeded by: Jasbir Sandhu

Personal details
- Born: July 9, 1950 (age 76) Chilliwack, British Columbia
- Party: Conservative
- Spouse: Chuck Cadman (m. 1969; died 2005)

Dona Cadman (born July 9, 1950) is a Canadian politician, who represented the electoral district of Surrey North in the House of Commons of Canada from 2008 to 2011, as well as the widow of Chuck Cadman, a former Member of Parliament for the same district. She served in the Conservative Party of Canada caucus.

== Background ==
She was born into a Canadian military family in Chilliwack, BC. In addition to residing in Germany, she lived in eleven different Canadian bases from coast to coast during her first 18 years.

Dona married Chuck Cadman (1948–2005) in 1969 and had two children; a daughter Jodi born in 1973 and a son Jesse (1976–1992). In 1992 their son Jesse was murdered in a random act of violence by a group of young offenders. In an effort to turn their personal tragedy into a cause for public good, in 1993 Dona and Chuck and a small group of friends founded CRY (Crime Responsibility and Youth). CRY was dedicated to strengthening the justice system and helping youth at risk in the hopes of preventing future senseless acts of violence. When her husband, Chuck, was later elected to Parliament, Dona remained active in Victim's Rights organizations and Criminal Justice reform groups.

She worked for Canada Post for ten years; and has also been active in her community, coaching girls softball and sitting on the Surrey Girls Softball Board of Directors. Dona is an active member of the Surrey Mayor's Crime Task Force and she sits on the development committee for the SOS Children's Village BC.

== Legal controversy ==
In an interview after the budget vote, Chuck Cadman said he voted in favour of the budget simply because he was obeying the wishes of constituents who did not want to face another election a year after giving the minority Liberals their shaky mandate.

Dona Cadman alleged that her husband told her that prior to the vote, two Conservative Party officials offered her husband a million-dollar life insurance policy in exchange for his vote to bring down the Liberal government in May 2005. These allegations first became publicly known in early 2008 in connection with the scheduled March 15, 2008 publication of Like A Rock: The Chuck Cadman Story, by Vancouver journalist Tom Zytaruk.

Under section 119 of the Criminal Code, it is illegal to bribe an MP. Accordingly, Opposition Liberal party Intergovernmental Affairs critic Dominic LeBlanc asked the RCMP in February 2008 to investigate this allegation, that the Conservatives had offered Mr. Cadman a million-dollar life insurance policy in exchange for his support on the budget vote. In May 2008, the RCMP announced that there was no evidence to support charges.

Prime Minister Stephen Harper responded to the Liberal repetition of these allegations with a $2.5 million libel lawsuit, alleging defamation.

Tom Zytaruk claimed to have an unedited audio tape of an interview with Stephen Harper where Harper acknowledged that Chuck Cadman had been approached by two Tories. Zytaruk then sold copies of the tape, through his publisher, for $500.

In March 2008, Cadman herself stated publicly she believed Harper. According to her, Harper "looked me straight in the eyes and told me he had no knowledge of an insurance policy offer. I knew he was telling me the truth; I could see it in his eyes." On the very same day Harper issues a notice of libel against the Liberal leader and his party in preparation of the libel suit that he would pursue 10 days later. (Unlike other democracies, Canada still allows political libel suits).

Based on copies of the tape, in early June 2008, the Conservatives introduced two affidavits from experts indicating the tape had been edited. James Moore, Conservative MP for Port Moody—Westwood—Port Coquitlam told a news conference June 4, 2008 that two audio specialists retained by the Conservative Party had determined that the tape in which PM Stephen Harper apparently confirms financial considerations had been offered to Chuck Cadman included "the insertion of a fabricated sound bite,". This was later refuted by the court appointed FBI expert who examined the original tape, and found the tape was not altered.

In early July 2008, Dona Cadman swore an affidavit that challenged some of Tom Zytaruk's assertions, though in a previous affidavit she maintains her "recollection of her husband's words to the effect that two Conservative operatives... offered him a million dollar life insurance policy in exchange for his vote," notes Liberal MP LeBlanc. Her new affidavit denies specific public accounts by Zytaruk of how he came to meet Harper that day, and he professed himself "extremely surprised, disappointed and deeply distressed" by her statement.

== Member of Parliament ==
Following her husband's death, Cadman endorsed New Democratic Party candidate Penny Priddy in the 2006 election. Priddy had been friendly with the Cadmans for many years, despite their sharp political differences.

Priddy went on to win, but retired after only one term. Cadman, who had by this time reconciled with the Conservatives, ran for the seat and won it narrowly, becoming a government backbencher. She was narrowly defeated in 2011 by New Democrat Jasbir Sandhu.

In the 2015 Canadian federal election, Cadman endorsed Justin Trudeau and the Liberal Party of Canada, as well as the Liberals' candidate for Surrey Centre, Randeep Sarai, who won the seat.
