= Tony Bhullar =

Canadian politician

Member of the British Columbia Legislative Assembly for Surrey-Newton
- In office May 16, 2001 – May 17, 2005
- Preceded by: Penny Priddy
- Succeeded by: Harry Bains

Personal details
- Party: BC Liberal

Tony Bhullar is a Canadian politician, who represented the electoral district of Surrey-Newton in the Legislative Assembly of British Columbia from 2001 to 2005. He sat as a member of the BC Liberal Party.

== Electoral record ==
B.C. General Election 2001: Surrey-Newton
Party	Candidate	Votes	%	±	Expenditures
Liberal	Tony Bhullar	6,750	49.45%		$51,429
NDP	Param Grewal	3,949	28.93%		$32,318
Green	David Walters	1,673	12.26%	–	$2,471
Unity	Paul Joshi	498	3.65%		$4,578
Marijuana	Stephen Kawamoto	364	2.20%		$394
Reform	Margaret Bridgman	159	0.96%		$1,285
Total Valid Votes		13,649	100.00%		
Total Rejected Ballots		92	0.67%		
Turnout		13,741	65.51%		
