= Surrey-Newton (provincial electoral district) =

Provincial electoral district in British Columbia, Canada

British Columbia electoral district
- Location in Surrey

Provincial electoral district
- Legislature: Legislative Assembly of British Columbia
MLA
Harj Dhaliwal
Conservative
- First contested: 1991
- Last contested: 2026

Demographics
- Population (2001): 58,340
- Area (km²): 12
- Pop. density (per km²): 4,861.7
- Census division: Metro Vancouver
- Census subdivision: Surrey

Surrey-Newton is a provincial electoral district for the Legislative Assembly of British Columbia, Canada.

The riding was first created out of the two-member Surrey district, which had been in existence since 1966, and first returned members of the Legislative Assembly (MLAs) in the 1986 election. Surrey had always been a battleground between the NDP and Social Credit, trading back and forth between the two parties. The riding was represented by Premier Rita Johnston, who was a prominent Cabinet minister in the Vander Zalm government between 1986 and 1991.

In 1991, Penny Priddy defeated Johnston in a realigning election that saw Social Credit experience massive defeats all across the province. During the NDP government from 1991 to 2001, Priddy emerged as a prominent Cabinet minister in portfolios such as Women's Equality, Tourism and Culture, Health, Labour and Children and Families.

The riding is home to a large South Asian community, whose population grew tremendously in the city Surrey starting in the early 1990s.

== Demographics ==
Population, 2001	50,281
Population change, 1996–2001	16.4%
Area (km^{2})	21
Population density (people per km^{2})	2,388

== 1999 redistribution ==
Surrey-Newton had its entire southern half removed.

== Members of the Legislative Assembly ==
Its MLA is Harj Dhaliwal. He was first elected in 2026. He represents the Conservative Party of British Columbia.

Surrey-Newton
Assembly	Years	Member	Party
Surrey prior to 1986
34th	1986–1991	Rita Johnston	Social Credit
35th	1991–1996	Penny Priddy	New Democratic
36th	1996–2001	Penny Priddy	New Democratic
37th	2001–2005	Tony Bhullar	Liberal
38th	2005–2009	Harry Bains	New Democratic
39th	2009–2013	Harry Bains	New Democratic
40th	2013–2017	Harry Bains	New Democratic
41st	2017–2020	Harry Bains	New Democratic
42nd	2020–2024	Harry Bains	New Democratic
43rd	2024–2026	Jessie Sunner	New Democratic
44th	2026–present	Harj Dhaliwal	Conservative

== Election results ==
Graph of provincial election results in Surrey-Newton (minor parties are combined into "Others")

2026 British Columbia general election
Party	Candidate	Votes	%	±%	Expenditures
Conservative	Harj Dhaliwal	7,334	54.33	+11.33	
New Democratic	Jessie Sunner	5,476	40.57	-10.63	
CentreBC	Harman Preet Singh	645	4.78	-	
Total valid votes		13,455	99.68		
Total rejected ballots		43	0.32		
Turnout					
Registered voters					
Conservative gain from New Democratic		Swing		+10.98	
Source: Elections BC

2024 British Columbia general election
Party	Candidate	Votes	%	±%	Expenditures
New Democratic	Jessie Sunner	7,924	51.2%	−11.2	
Conservative	Tegjot Bal	6,658	43.0%		
Freedom	Amrit Birring	371	2.4%		
Unaffiliated	Japreet Lehal	344	2.2%		
Independent	Joginder Singh Randhawa	189	1.2%		
Total valid votes		15,486	–		
Total rejected ballots					
Turnout					
Registered voters					
Source: Elections BC

2020 provincial election redistributed results
Party	%
New Democratic	62.4
Liberal	29.9
Green	7.5

2020 British Columbia general election
Party	Candidate	Votes	%	±%	Expenditures
New Democratic	Harry Bains	8,893	62.64	+5.27	$39,066.98
Liberal	Paul Boparai	3,911	27.55	−2.38	$0.00
Green	Asad Syed	1,393	9.81	+2.83	$6,482.79
Total valid votes		14,197	100.00	–	
Total rejected ballots		111	0.78	+0.11	
Turnout		14,308	47.91	–10.23	
Registered voters		29,867			
Source: Elections BC

2017 British Columbia general election
Party	Candidate	Votes	%	±%	Expenditures
New Democratic	Harry Bains	9,744	57.31	+0.89	$41,769
Liberal	Gurminder Singh Parihar	5,099	29.99	−8.08	$73,162
Green	Richard Krieger	1,172	6.89	–	$225
No affiliation	Balpreet Singh Bal	988	5.81	–	$8,768
Total valid votes		17,003	100.00	–	
Total rejected ballots		114	0.67	−0.42	
Turnout		17,117	58.14	+5.58	
Registered voters		29,442			
Source: Elections BC

2013 British Columbia general election
Party	Candidate	Votes	%	±%	Expenditures
New Democratic	Harry Bains	9,788	56.42	−12.51	$90,282
Liberal	Sukhminder S. Virk	6,604	38.07	+2.25	$86,997
Conservative	Satinder Singh	674	3.89	–	$3,660
Helping Hand	Alan Saldanha	282	1.63	–	$250
Total valid votes		17,348	100.00		
Total rejected ballots		191	1.09		
Turnout		17,539	52.56		
Source: Elections BC

2009 British Columbia general election
Party	Candidate	Votes	%	±%
New Democratic	Harry Bains	10,709	68.93	+11.04
Liberal	Ajay Caleb	4,011	25.82	−9.07
Green	Trevor Loke	759	4.89	+0.17
Communist	George Gidora	58	0.37	–

2005 British Columbia general election
Party	Candidate	Votes	%
New Democratic	Harry Bains	10,741	57.89
Liberal	Daniel Igali	6,473	34.89
Green	Dan Deresh	876	4.72
Democratic Reform	Harry Grewal	268	1.44
Work Less	Gordon Scott	123	0.66
Platinum	Jeff Robert Evans	72	0.39
Total		18,553	100.00

B.C. General Election 2001: Surrey-Newton
Party	Candidate	Votes	%	±	Expenditures
Liberal	Tony Bhullar	6,750	49.45%		$51,429
NDP	Param Grewal	3,949	28.93%		$32,318
Green	David Walters	1,673	12.26%	–	$2,471
Unity	Paul Joshi	498	3.65%		$4,578
Marijuana	Stephen Kawamoto	364	2.20%		$394
Reform	Margaret Bridgman	159	0.96%		$1,285
Total valid votes		13,649	100.00%		
Total rejected ballots		92	0.67%		
Turnout		13,741	65.51%		

B.C. General Election 1996: Surrey-Newton
Party	Candidate	Votes	%	±	Expenditures
NDP	Penny Priddy	13,969	49.54%		$42,833
Liberal	Indra Thind	9,788	34.71%		$54,778
Progressive Democrat	Ian Brown	1,841	6.53%	–	$100
Reform	Liaqat Bajwa	1,244	4.41%		$12,184
Family Coalition	Bill Stilwell	577	2.05%	–	$890
Green	Maureen A. MacDonald	340	1.21%	–	$100
Conservative	John Keith Bannister	217	0.77%		$931
Social Credit	Neil Maharaj	174	0.62%	–	$3,600
Natural Law	Shane Laporte	48	0.17%		$118
Total valid votes		28,198	100.00%		
Total rejected ballots		244	0.86%		
Turnout		28,442	71.33%		

B.C. General Election 1991: Surrey-Newton
Party	Candidate	Votes	%	±	Expenditures
NDP	Penny Priddy	10,193	42.28%		$47,584
Social Credit	Rita Johnston	7,796	32.33%	–	$126,919
Liberal	A. Charles McKinney	5,923	24.57%		$1,942
Green	Paul George	197	0.82%	–	$2,740
Total valid votes		24,109	100.00%		
Total rejected ballots		638	2.58%		
Turnout		24,747	76.28%		

== See also ==
- List of British Columbia provincial electoral districts
- Canadian provincial electoral districts

Legislative Assembly of British Columbia
Preceded by Richmond	Constituency represented by the premier 1991	Succeeded by Vancouver-Mount Pleasant
