= Randeep Sarai =

Canadian politician (born 1975)

The Honourable Randeep Sarai PC MP
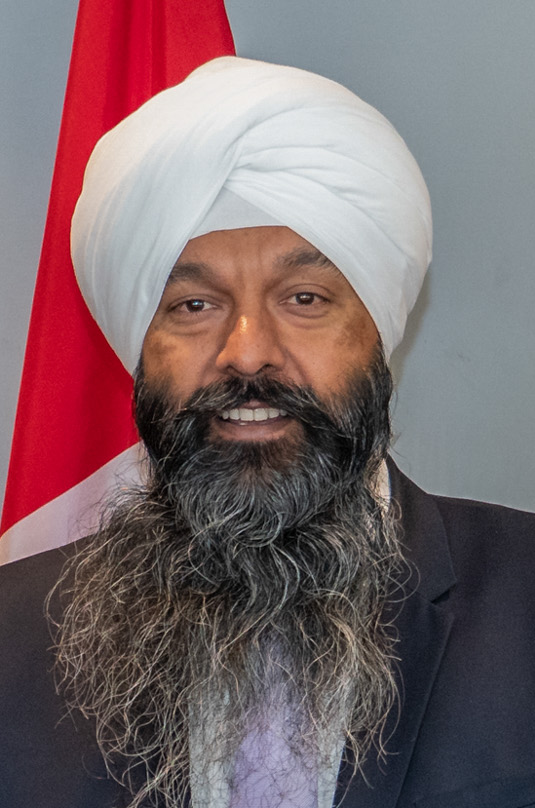
- Sarai in 2025

Secretary of State for International Development
- Incumbent
- Assumed office May 13, 2025
- Prime Minister: Mark Carney
- Preceded by: Mélanie Joly

Member of Parliament for Surrey Centre
- Incumbent
- Assumed office October 19, 2015
- Preceded by: Riding established

Personal details
- Born: 1974 or 1975 (age 50–51) Vancouver, British Columbia, Canada
- Party: Liberal

Randeep Singh Sarai PC MP (born April 15, 1975) is a Canadian politician who was elected as a Member of Parliament in the House of Commons of Canada to represent the federal electoral district Surrey Centre during the 2015 Canadian federal election.

== Early life ==
Sarai was born and raised in Burnaby, British Columbia to Sikh parents who had immigrated from Sarai Khas, Punjab, India. As a youth he developed a strong background in real estate development and urban planning. He attended Windsor Elementary School and after graduating from Burnaby South Secondary School in 1993, Sarai earned his bachelors of arts at the University of British Columbia with a major in political science in 1998. He then attended law school at Queen's University in Kingston, Ontario, graduating with a Bachelor of Laws (LLB) in 2001. Sarai was called to the bar in 2002, and practiced at a local law firm in Surrey before pursuing a career in politics.

== Federal politics ==
On October 19, 2015, Sarai was elected Member of Parliament for Surrey- Centre. He formerly sat on the Citizenship and Immigration Committee as well as the Canada- U.S. Inter-Parliamentary Association. Sarai had been the chair of the Liberal Party Pacific caucus, but has since resigned. and the co-chair of the Canada-Singapore Parliamentary Friendship Group.

On May 13, 2025, Sarai was named Secretary of State (International Development) in the cabinet of Prime Minister Mark Carney.

=== Electoral record ===
2025 Canadian federal election: Surrey Centre
** Preliminary results — Not yet official **
Party	Candidate	Votes	%	±%	Expenditures
Liberal	Randeep Sarai	21,103	47.89	+3.26	
Conservative	Rajvir Dhillon	19,071	43.27	+22.61	
New Democratic	Dominic Denofrio	3,009	6.83	–20.74	
Green	Krishan Khurana	422	0.96	–1.25	
People's	Beverly Tanchak	275	0.62	–3.24	
Communist	Ryan Abbott	190	0.43	+0.03	
Total valid votes/expense limit					
Total rejected ballots					
Turnout		44,070	62.10		
Eligible voters		70,970			
Liberal notional hold		Swing		–9.68	
Source: Elections Canada

2021 Canadian federal election: Surrey Centre
Party	Candidate	Votes	%	±%	Expenditures
Liberal	Randeep Sarai	16,862	44.4	+7.0	$88,830.88
New Democratic	Sonia Andhi	10,268	27.0	-0.5	$48,702.94
Conservative	Tina Bains	8,075	21.2	-4.2	$16,911.31
People's	Joe Kennedy	1,539	4.0	+2.3	$2,301.17
Green	Felix Kongyuy	838	2.2	-4.0	$0.00
Christian Heritage	Kevin Pielak	289	0.8	-0.1	$3,869.07
Communist	Ryan Abbott	137	0.4	+0.1	$0.00
Total valid votes/expense limit		38,386	98.7	–	$108,719.22
Total rejected ballots		510	1.3		
Turnout		38,896	51.7		
Eligible voters		75,297			
Liberal hold		Swing		+3.8	
Source: Elections Canada

2019 Canadian federal election: Surrey Centre
Party	Candidate	Votes	%	±%	Expenditures
Liberal	Randeep Sarai	15,453	37.40	-7.62	$83,457.32
New Democratic	Sarjit Singh Saran	11,353	27.48	-2.60	$50,584.88
Conservative	Tina Bains	10,505	25.42	+5.62	$45,184.43
Green	John Werring	2,558	6.19	+2.73	$2,721.98
People's	Jaswinder Singh Dilawari	709	1.72		$5,821.65
Christian Heritage	Kevin Pielak	378	0.91	-0.37	none listed
Independent	Jeffrey Breti	243	0.59		none listed
Communist	George Gidora	120	0.29	-0.02	none listed
Total valid votes/expense limit		41,319	98.87		
Total rejected ballots		471	1.13	+0.32	
Turnout		41,790	54.46	-6.05	
Eligible voters		76,731			
Liberal hold		Swing		-2.54	
Source: Elections Canada

2015 Canadian federal election: Surrey Centre
Party	Candidate	Votes	%	±%	Expenditures
Liberal	Randeep Sarai	19,471	45.07	+27.31	$106,885.13
New Democratic	Jasbir Sandhu	12,992	30.08	-9.95	$128,114.24
Conservative	Sucha Thind	8,556	19.81	-15.85	$93,713.10
Green	Jeremiah Deneault	1,493	3.46	-0.18	–
Christian Heritage	Kevin Pielak	553	1.28	–	$5,295.88
Communist	Iqbal Kahlon	133	0.31	–	–
Total valid votes/expense limit		43,198	99.19		$203,771.47
Total rejected ballots		352	0.81	–	
Turnout		43,550	60.51	–	
Eligible voters		71,966			
Liberal gain from New Democratic		Swing		+18.63	
Source: Elections Canada
