= Jasbir Sandhu =

Canadian politician (born 1966)

Member of Parliament for Surrey North
- In office May 30, 2011 – August 4, 2015
- Preceded by: Dona Cadman
- Succeeded by: Randeep Sarai

Personal details
- Born: April 21, 1966 (age 60) Punjab, India
- Party: New Democratic Party
- Spouse: Simi
- Education: Royal Roads University; Simon Fraser University
- Profession: Politician

Jasbir Sandhu (born April 21, 1966) is a former Canadian politician. He was a Member of Parliament in the 41st Parliament. He was elected to the House of Commons in the 2011 federal election and represented the electoral district of Surrey North for the New Democratic Party. He served as the Official Opposition's critic on Public Safety and for the Asia-Pacific Gateway project. He sought re-election in 2015 but lost to Randeep Sarai of the Liberal Party.

As a child, Sandhu immigrated to Canada where he completed high school and graduated from Simon Fraser University and Royal Roads University with an MBA. He worked at the Justice Institute of British Columbia as a program coordinator. He helped operate a program which provided training and testing of taxi drivers in Metro Vancouver. Sandhu was the spokesperson for the Professor Mohan Singh Memorial Foundation which advocated for an apology from the federal government over its actions during the Komagata Maru incident.

== Background ==
As a child, Jasbir, with his family, emigrated to Canada from Punjab, India, where he was born. He lived in Surrey where his family owned a small business and restaurant. He graduated from Queen Elizabeth Secondary School. He attended Simon Fraser University where he graduated with a bachelor's degree, and then Royal Roads University where he received a Master's of Business Administration. Beginning in the mid-1990s Sandhu began working as an instructor and program coordinator at the Justice Institute. Under the province's SuperHost program, the City of Vancouver initiated a new permitting system, put into effect in 1997, for taxi drivers at the Justice Institute. Sandhu became the program manager of this program called TaxiHost, mandatory for all taxi drivers, in which drivers had to pass a written multiple-choice exam on topics such as defensive driving, customer service, local geography, and basic English. While the program had a high failure rate initially, it produced favourable results and was extended over Metro Vancouver and formed the basis for a similar system in Calgary.

Sandhu volunteered at the United Way for one campaign and served a term as a board member at Vancity Community Foundation. He also served as the spokesperson for the Prof Mohan Singh Memorial Foundation which lobbied for an apology from the federal government for the 1914 Komagata Maru incident. Prime Minister Stephen Harper delivered the apology in August 2008 at a community gathering at Bear Creek in Surrey. Sandhu and the group believed it would be accompanied by an apology in the House of Commons. After expressing disappointment in the limited apology and the lack of acknowledgement in the House of Commons, the government representatives accused Sandhu and the group of engaging in "dirty politics".

== Politics ==
With a snap election expected, the NDP nominated Sandhu as their candidate in the Surrey North riding. While he was nominated in September 2009, the general election was eventually scheduled for May 2011. As the election approached, it became apparent the Surrey North race would be a close race between Sandhu and the incumbent MP Dona Cadman of the Conservative Party. With Cadman being criticized for not voting on an HST bill and for being largely absent from the public view, Sandhu became the favourite to win. In the May 2 vote, Sandhu defeated Cadman and five other candidates to win the riding with 40% of the vote.

In the 41st Parliament, with Sandhu's New Democratic Party forming the official opposition, party leader Jack Layton appointed him as critic for public safety. As such Sandhu spoke out against the costs of the Conservative government's crime bills which involved minimum sentencing, internet surveillance, and opening large new penal facilities. Sandhu hosted a public forum at the Surrey campus of SFU concerning public safety and crime issues. He sat on three standing committees: Public Safety and National Security, Justice and Human Rights, and International Trade. During the NDP leadership election, he endorsed Brian Topp. After Thomas Mulcair won, Sandhu was moved to the role of critic on Asia-Pacific Gateway project, effective April 2012.

He sought re-election in the 2015 Canadian federal election in the riding of Surrey Centre but was defeated by Randeep Sarai of the Liberal Party of Canada who went on to form a majority government.

== Electoral record ==
2011 Canadian federal election: Surrey North
Party	Candidate	Votes	%	±%
New Democratic	Jasbir Sandhu	14,678	39.69	+3.52
Conservative	Dona Cadman	13,181	35.64	-3.71
Liberal	Shinder Purewal	6,797	18.38	+3.37
Green	Bernadette Keenan	1,289	3.49	-2.08
Independent	Jamie Scott	451	1.22	–
Christian Heritage	Kevin Pielak	303	0.82	-0.57
Libertarian	Norris Barens	284	0.77	-0.23
Total valid votes		36,983	99.28	
Total rejected, unmarked, and declined ballots		267	0.72	-0.13
Turnout		37,250	52.31	
Eligible voters		71,212	–	–
