= Harj Dhaliwal =

Canadian politician

Harj Dhaliwal MLA

Member of the Legislative Assembly for Surrey-Newton
- Incumbent
- Assumed office October 24, 2026
- Preceded by: Jessie Sunner

Parliamentary Secretary for Translink
- Incumbent
- Assumed office November 20, 2026
- Preceded by: Office Established

Personal details
- Party: Conservative
- Website: website

Harj Dhaliwal MLA is a Canadian politician who is the Member of the British Columbia Legislative Assembly for Surrey-Newton since the 2026 British Columbia general election. He is of Punjabi descent and was previously a director for TransLink as well as a board member of the British Columbia Society for the Prevention of Cruelty to Animals.

== Electoral record ==
2026 British Columbia general election: Surrey-Newton
Party	Candidate	Votes	%	±%	Expenditures
Conservative	Harj Dhaliwal	8,003	54.53		
New Democratic	Jessie Sunner	5,924	40.36		
CentreBC	Harman Preet Singh	698	4.76	—	
Total valid votes		14,625	99.65		
Total rejected ballots		52	0.35		
Turnout		14,677			
Registered voters					
Conservative gain from New Democratic		Swing		+10.98	
Source: Elections BC
