= Jim Karpoff =

Canadian politician

James Capsey Karpoff
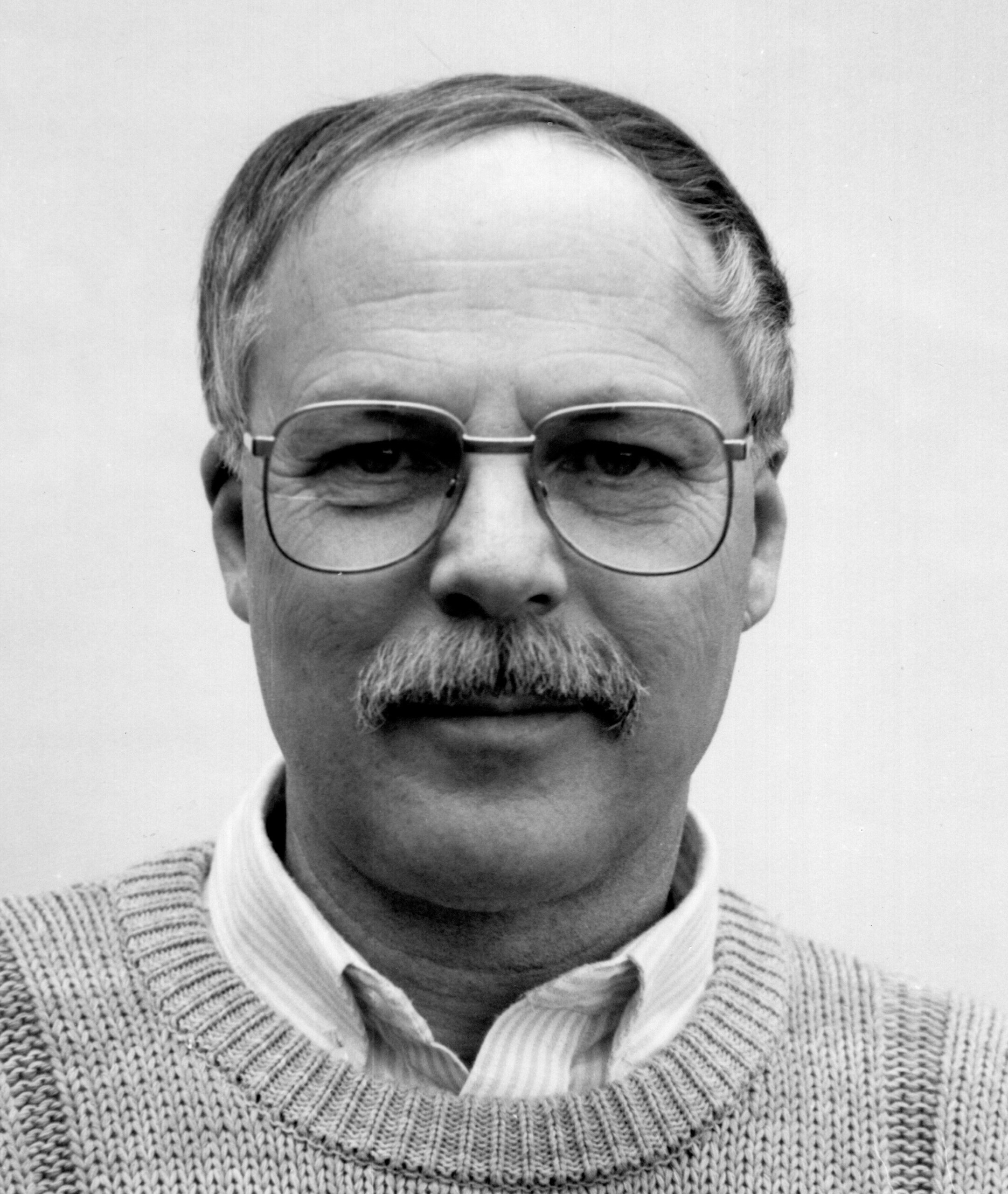

Member of Parliament for Surrey North
- In office 1988–1993
- Preceded by: first member
- Succeeded by: Margaret Bridgman

Personal details
- Born: October 14, 1937 (age 88) Smoky Lake, Alberta
- Party: New Democrat
- Occupation: social worker

James Capsey Karpoff (born October 14, 1937, in Smoky Lake, Alberta) is a former Canadian politician. Karpoff was a member of Parliament from 1988 to 1993, representing the riding of Surrey North in British Columbia.

He was first elected to Parliament for Surrey North in the 1988 election as a member of the New Democratic Party. He was defeated by Margaret Bridgman in 1993 and Chuck Cadman in 2004.

Before entering politics, Karpoff was an administrator and social worker.
