= Chuck Cadman =

Canadian politician

- Cadman during a confidence vote on the federal budget on May 19, 2005

Member of Parliament for Surrey North
- In office June 2, 1997 – July 9, 2005
- Preceded by: Margaret Bridgman
- Succeeded by: Penny Priddy

Personal details
- Born: Charles Cadman; February 21, 1948 Kitchener, Ontario, Canada
- Died: July 9, 2005 (aged 57) Surrey, British Columbia, Canada
- Party: Reform (1997–2000); Canadian Alliance (2000–2004); Independent (2004–2005)
- Spouse: Dona Cadman (m. 1969)
- Children: 2
- Occupation: Engineering technician

Charles Cadman (February 21, 1948 – July 9, 2005) was a Canadian politician and Member of Parliament (MP) from 1997 to 2005, representing the riding of Surrey North in Surrey, British Columbia.

Originally a Canadian Alliance MP, Cadman won re-election as an independent after losing a nomination race in his own riding. This history garnered him national media attention when, on May 19, 2005, Cadman cast a deciding tie vote to save a minority Liberal government supported by the New Democratic Party that the Conservative Party at the time was trying to defeat to trigger an election.

== Early life ==
Cadman was born in Kitchener, Ontario, and grew up in North Bay, Ontario. He was a guitarist with a band called The Fringe, which toured Canada. He also played backup to The Guess Who on CBC Television. He eventually settled in Surrey, British Columbia. He attended the British Columbia Institute of Technology and became a certified electrical and electronics engineering technician. He worked for ten years as a microfiche camera technician for the Insurance Corporation of British Columbia. He married Dona Cadman in 1969; they had two children: Jodi and Jesse.

== Political career ==
On October 18, 1992, Cadman's 16-year-old son Jesse was stabbed to death in a random street attack by a group of young people. In response to Jesse's death, Cadman and his wife Dona created the group CRY – Crime Responsibility and Youth – and counselled teens likely to become violent. He also campaigned for a tougher Young Offenders Act. His activism against youth violence propelled him into politics, first to carry on his fight against youth violence and for victims' rights. He was first elected to Parliament for Surrey North in the 1997 election as a member of the Reform Party of Canada. He introduced a private members bill which proposed to raise the maximum jail term for parents whose children commit crimes while under their supervision. This bill was later incorporated into Canada's Youth Criminal Justice Act in November 2000. He was also known for wearing a ponytail and blue jeans in Parliament.

He was re-elected under the banner of the Canadian Alliance in the 2000 election, and was appointed Justice Critic. However, prior to the 2004 election Cadman lost the nomination for the Conservative Party to Jasbir Singh Cheema, a former television news anchor who brought a very large number of new party members to the vote. Cadman was also diagnosed with cancer in early May 2004 and underwent surgery to remove a tumour from his groin. He then ran as an independent in that election and was elected. He heard about the election call from his hospital bed.

He was the only candidate not affiliated with a party to win a seat in the 2004 election, and remained an independent, refusing offers to rejoin the Conservatives. Originally sitting as the only independent in a minority government, Cadman held considerable power. (Carolyn Parrish, David Kilgour, and Pat O'Brien – all elected as Liberals – would later sit as independents.)

=== 2005 budget vote ===
On May 19, 2005, Cadman flew to Ottawa for a confidence vote not long after undergoing chemotherapy treatment for melanoma, the most dangerous form of skin cancer. Cadman voted with the government on the 2005 budget, which had incorporated amendments proposed by the NDP, and forced a tie in the House of Commons. The tie was broken by Peter Milliken the Speaker of the House of Commons, who voted in favour of the Liberal budget (who explained he simply did so because the Speaker traditionally votes to continue a government). The budget was later passed in Cadman's absence on June 23, 2005. In an interview after the budget vote, Cadman said he voted in favour of the budget simply because he was obeying the wishes of constituents who did not want to face another election a year after giving the minority Liberals their shaky mandate.

=== Allegations of bribery, the tape, the lawsuit ===
Dona Cadman says that her husband told her that prior to the vote, two Conservative Party officials, later suggested to be Tom Flanagan and Doug Finley, offered her husband a million-dollar life insurance policy in exchange for his vote against the Liberal budget in May 2005, the rationale being replacement of the life insurance that is part of an MP's compensation package (since Cadman was not running for re-election and would thus not die an MP if he voted down the government). An audio tape suggests then-opposition leader Stephen Harper was not only aware of a financial offer to Chuck Cadman but gave it his personal approval. According to Dona Cadman, Harper "looked me straight in the eyes and told me he had no knowledge of an insurance policy offer. I knew he was telling me the truth; I could see it in his eyes." Cadman's daughter also acknowledged that her father had been disturbed by the offer. Harper later stated in an August 2008 court deposition that he personally authorized an offer made to Cadman in 2005; however, this offer was of the normal amount offered to a candidate running in an election campaign. The Conservative Party, based upon analysis by forensic experts who concluded that the tape was edited, asked an Ontario court to order to Liberals to stop using the tape. But neutral expert testimony showed that the tape has not been edited.

Under section 119 of the Criminal Code, it is illegal to bribe an MP. Accordingly, Opposition Liberal party Intergovernmental Affairs critic Dominic LeBlanc asked the RCMP in February 2008 to investigate the allegation that the Conservatives had offered Cadman a million-dollar life insurance policy in exchange for his support on the budget vote. In May 2008, the RCMP announced that there was no evidence to support charges.

James Moore, Conservative MP for Port Moody—Westwood—Port Coquitlam told a news conference June 4, 2008, that two top audio specialists found that the tape in which PM Stephen Harper confirms financial considerations had been offered to Chuck Cadman had been altered. But LeBlanc said on June 5, 2008, that the Tories have not been clear about what they claim was doctored on the tape. He said the Tories have also forgotten a huge part of the allegations – the testimony of Cadman's widow, Dona Cadman. In her affidavit, Dona Cadman "repeats very clearly her recollection of her husband's words to the effect that two Conservative operatives ... offered him a million dollar life insurance policy in exchange for his vote", said LeBlanc.

Tom Zytaruk, the reporter who made the recording said "I know I didn't doctor any tape. So in a sense all this stuff that [Conservative MP] James Moore is saying is meaningless. I know what happened."

In early July 2008, Dona Cadman swore an affidavit that challenged some of Tom Zytaruk's assertions. She denied specific public accounts by Zytaruk of how he came to meet Harper that day, and he professed himself "extremely surprised, disappointed and deeply distressed" by her statement.

=== Political libel chill ===
Liberals redoubled their use of the Cadman material – some argued that the RCMP inaction was possibly due to political interference while others argued that the standard of proof for criminal law was too high to satisfy when an official was willing to commit perjury. Neither of these allegations were made through official channels.

However, the bold statement that "Harper knew of Conservative bribery" did appear as the title of a press release. In a rare political libel case, Prime Minister Harper filed a libel lawsuit against the Liberal Party over statements on the party's website regarding the Chuck Cadman affair published under this title.

With the filing of the suit, open political comment on the case effectively stopped, an example of libel chill.

The suit was settled in February 2009 after Michael Ignatieff took over leadership of the Party.

== Death ==
On July 9, 2005, Cadman died at his home after a two-year-long bout with melanoma. Cadman's memorial service was held on July 16, 2005, at Johnston Heights Church in Surrey. Over 1,500 people were in attendance: in addition to family, friends, and politicians of all parties in the church itself, Cadman's constituents packed the neighbouring assembly hall and courtyard to pay their last respects by watching the service on television screens. Speeches honouring Cadman as a family man, parliamentarian, and advocate for victim's rights were made by Cadman's daughter, Jodi, Prime Minister Paul Martin, BC MLA Kevin Falcon, BC MLA Dave Hayer, Surrey City Councillor Penny Priddy and several others.

On 15 March 2008, Vancouver journalist Tom Zytaruk published a biography of Cadman entitled Like A Rock: The Chuck Cadman Story, in which the bribery allegations are explored in depth.

His widow, Dona, endorsed Penny Priddy as Cadman's successor in the 2006 federal election. Priddy, a longtime member of the New Democratic Party, had been friendly with the Cadmans for many years despite their sharp political differences. Dona Cadman subsequently reconciled with the Conservatives and was elected to her husband's seat in 2008. She only held it for one term before it fell to the NDP in 2011.

== Electoral record ==
2004 Canadian federal election
Party	Candidate	Votes	%	±%	Expenditures
Independent	Chuck Cadman	15,089	43.79%	*	$67,419
New Democratic	Jim Karpoff	8,312	24.12%	+16.77%	$42,786
Liberal	Dan Sheel	5,413	15.71%	−13.16%	$62,788
Conservative	Jasbir Singh Cheema	4,340	12.59%	−48.32%	$68,848
Green	Sunny Athwal	658	1.91%	–	$6,169
Christian Heritage	Gerhard Herwig	460	1.33%	–	$5,235
Communist	Joyce Holmes	93	0.26%	−0.22%	$512
Canadian Action	Roy Tyler Whyte	85	0.24%	–	$444
Total valid votes		34,450	100.00%		
Total rejected ballots		254	0.73%	+0.29%	
Turnout		34,704	55.4%		

* Note: Chuck Cadman's share of the popular vote as an independent candidate declined by -12.31% from his share as the Canadian Alliance candidate in the 2000 election.

Note: Conservative Party vote is compared to the total of the Canadian Alliance and Progressive Conservative vote in the 2000 election.

2000 Canadian federal election
Party	Candidate	Votes	%	±%	Expenditures
Alliance	Chuck Cadman	19,973	56.10%	+9.30%	$54,054
Liberal	Shinder Purewal	10,279	28.87%	+0.71%	$60,897
New Democratic	Art Hildebrant	2,619	7.35%	−11.70%	$6,657
Progressive Conservative	Dareck Faichuk	1,714	4.81%	+1.65%	$2,651
Green	Brian Lutes	556	1.56%	+0.75%	
Independent	Gerhard Herwig	285	0.80%	–	$2,138
Communist	Tyler Campbell	174	0.48%	–	$189
Total valid votes		35,600	100.00%		
Total rejected ballots		192	0.54%	−0.13%	
Turnout		35,792	55.4%	−6%	

Note: Canadian Alliance vote is compared to the Reform Party vote in the 1997 election.

1997 Canadian federal election
Party	Candidate	Votes	%	±%	Expenditures
Reform	Chuck Cadman	16,158	46.80%	+9.84%	$56,674
Liberal	Clayton J. Campbell	9,723	28.16%	+1.82%	$55,219
New Democratic	Judy Villeneuve	6,579	19.05%	+1.93%	$44,861
Progressive Conservative	David Sikal	1,093	3.16%	−10.64%	$11,791
Christian Heritage	Allen Gray	291	0.84%	−0.65%	$1,573
Green	Suzanne Shephard	280	0.81%	–	
Independent	Donald I. Knight	200	0.57%	–	$10,505
Canadian Action	Vlad Marjanovic	87	0.25%	–	$2,335
Natural Law	Anthony Quance	70	0.20%	−0.43%	
Marxist–Leninist	Mardi Couture	42	0.12%	–	
Total valid votes		34,523	100.00%		
Total rejected ballots		234	0.67%		
Turnout		34,757	61%		

== Archives ==
There is a Chuck Cadman fonds at Library and Archives Canada. Archival reference number is R13269.
