= Harry Bains =

Canadian politician

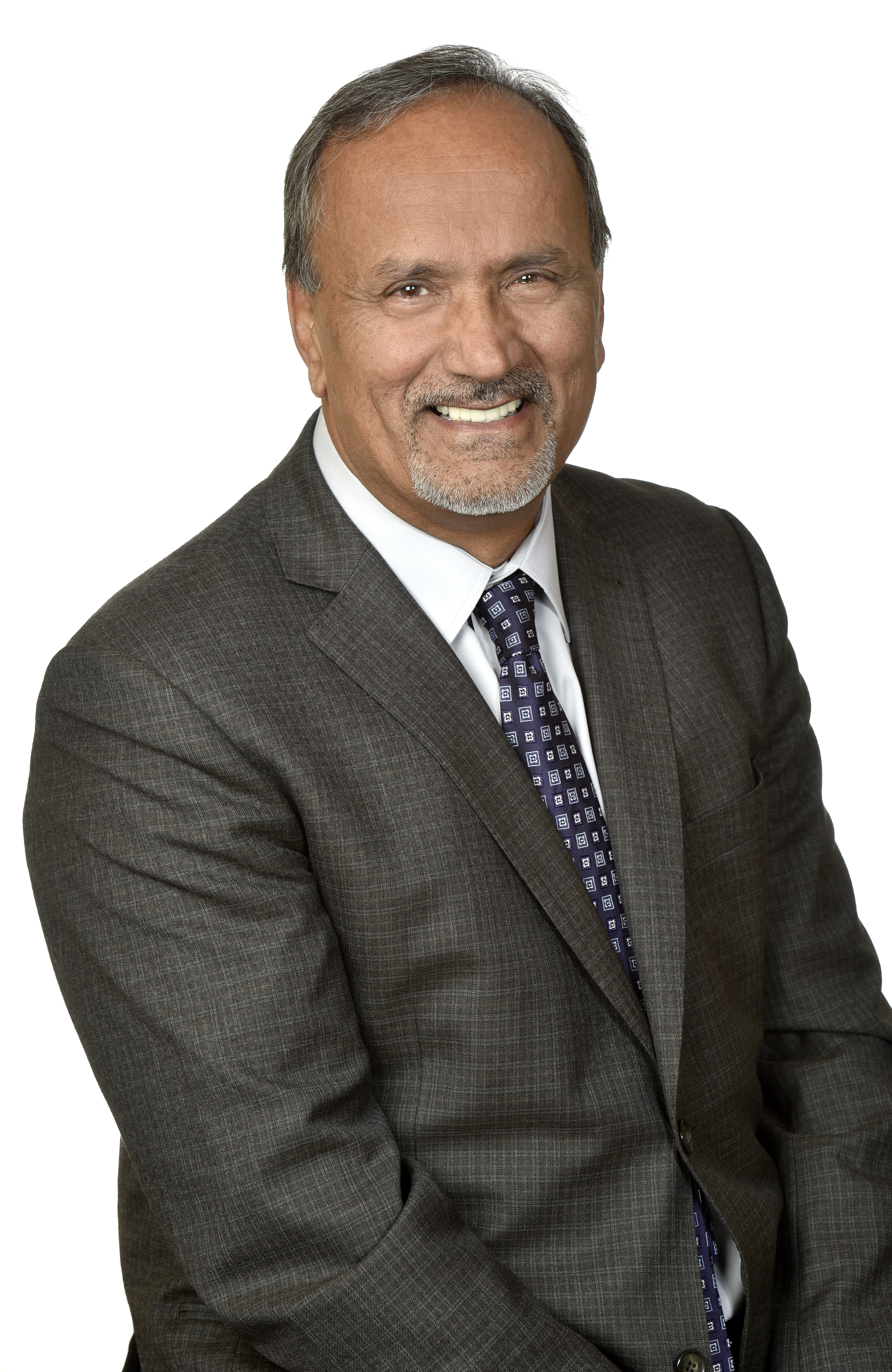

Minister of Labour of British Columbia
- In office July 18, 2017 – November 18, 2024
- Premier: John Horgan; David Eby
- Preceded by: Shirley Bond
- Succeeded by: Jennifer Whiteside

Member of the British Columbia Legislative Assembly for Surrey-Newton
- In office May 17, 2005 – September 21, 2024
- Preceded by: Tony Bhullar

Personal details
- Born: 1951 or 1952 (age 74–75)
- Party: New Democrat

Harry Bains is a Canadian politician who was the Minister of Labour in British Columbia from 2017 until 2024. He was the NDP MLA for Surrey-Newton from 2005 until 2024. He is from a Sikh family and has origins from Village Hardaspur, District Kapurthala Punjab.

== Career ==
Bains has experience in education due to his service on the Kwantlen University College Board of Governors as board member and vice chair from 1993 and 1999. He has also volunteered with Habitat for Humanity.

Bains was an elected officer of Steelworkers-IWA Canada Local 2171 for over fifteen years. He has served most recently as full-time vice president of his local chapter, in which he led negotiations and helped in bargaining to improve workers wages and working conditions.

In 2026, Bains endorsed Rob Ashton in that year's federal NDP leadership race.

== Critic roles ==
Bains served as opposition critic for the 2010 winter Olympic Games, Transportation and Infrastructure, forestry. Bains also served as Jobs, Employment, Labour and Worksafe BC Critic in the NDP shadow cabinet.

== Election results ==
2020 British Columbia general election: Surrey-Newton
Party	Candidate	Votes	%	±%	Expenditures
New Democratic	Harry Bains	8,893	62.64	+5.27	$39,066.98
Liberal	Paul Boparai	3,911	27.55	−2.38	$0.00
Green	Asad Syed	1,393	9.81	+2.83	$6,482.79
Total valid votes		14,197	100.00	–	
Total rejected ballots		111	0.78	+0.11	
Turnout		14,308	47.91	–10.23	
Registered voters		29,867			
Source: Elections BC

2017 British Columbia general election: Surrey-Newton
Party	Candidate	Votes	%	±%	Expenditures
New Democratic	Harry Bains	9,744	57.31	+0.89	$41,769
Liberal	Gurminder Singh Parihar	5,099	29.99	−8.08	$73,162
Green	Richard Krieger	1,172	6.89	–	$225
No affiliation	Balpreet Singh Bal	988	5.81	–	$8,768
Total valid votes		17,003	100.00	–	
Total rejected ballots		114	0.67	−0.42	
Turnout		17,117	58.14	+5.58	
Registered voters		29,442			
Source: Elections BC

2013 British Columbia general election: Surrey-Newton
Party	Candidate	Votes	%	±%	Expenditures
New Democratic	Harry Bains	9,788	56.42	−12.51	$90,282
Liberal	Sukhminder S. Virk	6,604	38.07	+2.25	$86,997
Conservative	Satinder Singh	674	3.89	–	$3,660
Helping Hand	Alan Saldanha	282	1.63	–	$250
Total valid votes		17,348	100.00		
Total rejected ballots		191	1.09		
Turnout		17,539	52.56		
Source: Elections BC

2009 British Columbia general election: Surrey-Newton
Party	Candidate	Votes	%	±%
New Democratic	Harry Bains	10,709	68.93	+11.04
Liberal	Ajay Caleb	4,011	25.82	−9.07
Green	Trevor Loke	759	4.89	+0.17
Communist	George Gidora	58	0.37	–

2005 British Columbia general election: Surrey-Newton
Party	Candidate	Votes	%
New Democratic	Harry Bains	10,741	57.89
Liberal	Daniel Igali	6,473	34.89
Green	Dan Deresh	876	4.72
Democratic Reform	Harry Grewal	268	1.44
Work Less	Gordon Scott	123	0.66
Platinum	Jeff Robert Evans	72	0.39
Total		18,553	100.00

== Personal life ==
Bains and his wife Rajvinder live in Surrey with their two children. He is an advocate for workers' rights and equality.

British Columbia provincial government of John Horgan
Cabinet post (1)
Predecessor	Office	Successor
Shirley Bond	Minister of Labour; July 18, 2017–	Incumbent
