= Surrey Centre =

Federal electoral district in British Columbia, Canada

British Columbia electoral district
- Interactive map of riding boundaries from the 2025 federal election
- Coordinates: 49.190°N 122.847°W

Federal electoral district
- Legislature: House of Commons
MP
Randeep Sarai
Liberal
- District created: 2013
- First contested: 2015
- Last contested: 2025
- District webpage: profile, map

Demographics
- Population (2016): 120,172
- Electors (2015): 68,719
- Area (km²): 40
- Pop. density (per km²): 3,004.3
- Census division: Metro Vancouver
- Census subdivision: Surrey (part)

Surrey Centre (French: Surrey-Centre) is a federal electoral district in British Columbia. It encompasses a portion of British Columbia previously included in the electoral district of Surrey North.

Surrey Centre was created by the 2012 federal electoral boundaries redistribution and was legally defined in the 2013 representation order. It came into effect upon the call of the 42nd Canadian federal election, scheduled for October 2015.

== Demographics ==
Panethnic groups in Surrey Centre (2011−2021)
Panethnic group	2021		2016		2011	
Panethnic group	Pop.	%	Pop.	%	Pop.	%
South Asian	52,060	40.04%	41,515	35.06%	36,530	33.23%
European (Note: Statistic includes all persons that did not make up part of a visible minority or an indigenous identity.)	28,845	22.19%	36,030	30.43%	39,670	36.09%
Southeast Asian (Note: Statistic includes total responses of "Filipino" and "Southeast Asian" under visible minority section on census.)	18,800	14.46%	15,065	12.72%	14,325	13.03%
East Asian (Note: Statistic includes total responses of "Chinese", "Korean", and "Japanese" under visible minority section on census.)	9,680	7.45%	8,910	7.52%	7,320	6.66%
Middle Eastern (Note: Statistic includes total responses of "West Asian" and "Arab" under visible minority section on census.)	5,420	4.17%	4,195	3.54%	2,235	2.03%
African	4,545	3.5%	3,225	2.72%	2,035	1.85%
Indigenous	3,660	2.82%	4,465	3.77%	4,175	3.8%
Latin American	2,955	2.27%	2,450	2.07%	2,110	1.92%
Other (Note: Statistic includes total responses of "Visible minority, n.i.e." and "Multiple visible minorities" under visible minority section on census.)	4,050	3.12%	2,555	2.16%	1,530	1.39%
Total responses	130,010	98.74%	118,410	98.53%	109,915	98.59%
Total population	131,670	100%	120,172	100%	111,486	100%
Notes: Totals greater than 100% due to multiple origin responses. Demographics based on 2012 Canadian federal electoral redistribution riding boundaries.

== Members of Parliament ==
This riding has elected the following members of the House of Commons of Canada:

Parliament	Years	Member	Party
Surrey Centre; Riding created from Surrey North
42nd	2015–2019	Randeep Sarai	Liberal
43rd	2019–2021	Randeep Sarai	Liberal
44th	2021–2025	Randeep Sarai	Liberal
45th	2025–present	Randeep Sarai	Liberal

== Election results ==
Graph of election results in Surrey Centre (minor parties that never got 2% of the vote or didn't run consistently are omitted)

=== 2023 representation order ===
2025 Canadian federal election
** Preliminary results — Not yet official **
Party	Candidate	Votes	%	±%	Expenditures
Liberal	Randeep Sarai	21,103	47.89	+3.26	
Conservative	Rajvir Dhillon	19,071	43.27	+22.61	
New Democratic	Dominic Denofrio	3,009	6.83	–20.74	
Green	Krishan Khurana	422	0.96	–1.25	
People's	Beverly Tanchak	275	0.62	–3.24	
Communist	Ryan Abbott	190	0.43	+0.03	
Total valid votes/expense limit					
Total rejected ballots					
Turnout		44,070	62.10		
Eligible voters		70,970			
Liberal notional hold		Swing		–9.68	
Source: Elections Canada

2021 federal election redistributed results
Party	Vote	%
Liberal	15,753	44.63
New Democratic	9,729	27.57
Conservative	7,292	20.66
People's	1,361	3.86
Green	780	2.21
Others	379	1.07

=== 2013 representation order ===
2021 Canadian federal election
Party	Candidate	Votes	%	±%	Expenditures
Liberal	Randeep Sarai	16,862	44.4	+7.0	$88,830.88
New Democratic	Sonia Andhi	10,268	27.0	-0.5	$48,702.94
Conservative	Tina Bains	8,075	21.2	-4.2	$16,911.31
People's	Joe Kennedy	1,539	4.0	+2.3	$2,301.17
Green	Felix Kongyuy	838	2.2	-4.0	$0.00
Christian Heritage	Kevin Pielak	289	0.8	-0.1	$3,869.07
Communist	Ryan Abbott	137	0.4	+0.1	$0.00
Total valid votes/expense limit		38,386	98.7	–	$108,719.22
Total rejected ballots		510	1.3		
Turnout		38,896	51.7		
Eligible voters		75,297			
Liberal hold		Swing		+3.8	
Source: Elections Canada

2019 Canadian federal election
Party	Candidate	Votes	%	±%	Expenditures
Liberal	Randeep Sarai	15,453	37.40	-7.62	$83,457.32
New Democratic	Sarjit Singh Saran	11,353	27.48	-2.60	$50,584.88
Conservative	Tina Bains	10,505	25.42	+5.62	$45,184.43
Green	John Werring	2,558	6.19	+2.73	$2,721.98
People's	Jaswinder Singh Dilawari	709	1.72		$5,821.65
Christian Heritage	Kevin Pielak	378	0.91	-0.37	none listed
Independent	Jeffrey Breti	243	0.59		none listed
Communist	George Gidora	120	0.29	-0.02	none listed
Total valid votes/expense limit		41,319	98.87		
Total rejected ballots		471	1.13	+0.32	
Turnout		41,790	54.46	-6.05	
Eligible voters		76,731			
Liberal hold		Swing		-2.54	
Source: Elections Canada

2015 Canadian federal election
Party	Candidate	Votes	%	±%	Expenditures
Liberal	Randeep Sarai	19,471	45.07	+27.31	$106,885.13
New Democratic	Jasbir Sandhu	12,992	30.08	-9.95	$128,114.24
Conservative	Sucha Thind	8,556	19.81	-15.85	$93,713.10
Green	Jeremiah Deneault	1,493	3.46	-0.18	–
Christian Heritage	Kevin Pielak	553	1.28	–	$5,295.88
Communist	Iqbal Kahlon	133	0.31	–	–
Total valid votes/expense limit		43,198	99.19		$203,771.47
Total rejected ballots		352	0.81	–	
Turnout		43,550	60.51	–	
Eligible voters		71,966			
Liberal gain from New Democratic		Swing		+18.63	
Source: Elections Canada

2011 federal election redistributed results
Party	Vote	%
New Democratic	13,041	40.03
Conservative	11,618	35.66
Liberal	5,787	17.76
Green	1,186	3.64
Others	949	2.91

== See also ==
- List of Canadian electoral districts
- Historical federal electoral districts of Canada
