= Sarai Khas =

Sarai-khas Sarawa
- village
- Location in Punjab, India Sarai-khas (India)
- Coordinates: 31.407293°N 75.5102°E
- Country: India
- State: Punjab
- District: Jalandhar
- Block: Jalandhar West
- Tehsil: Kartarpur
- Founded by: Atto Jatt Sarai

Population
  - Total: 7,044

Languages
  - Official: Punjabi
- Time zone: UTC+5:30 (IST)
- PIN: 144805
- Vehicle registration: PB 08
- Nearest city: Kartarpur
- Climate: Humid subtropical climate
- Avg. summer temperature: 47 °C (117 °F)
- Avg. winter temperature: 5 °C (41 °F)

Sarai-Khas (also known as "Biby Pind" and "Sarawa") is a village in Jalandhar - II sub-district, Jalandhar district in the Indian state of Punjab. The village is situated seven miles from Jalandhar, two miles from Kartarpur, and half a mile south of the Grand Trunk Road.

== Demographics ==
In the 2011 census, the village had 1511 households and 7044 inhabitants, many of whom were farmers.

== Climate ==
It has a humid subtropical climate with cool winters and hot summers. Summers last from April to June and winters from November to February. The climate is dry on the whole, except during the brief southwest monsoon season during July and August. The average annual rainfall is about 70 cm.

== History ==
Sarai-Khas was founded by Atto Jatt Sarai more than 300 years ago. Sarai had four sons: Uttam (Billa), Ram Ditta (Chela), Bura (Bura) & Bhagari (Bhagari). The village was subsequently divided into four Parts (Patti's) - Billa, Bura, Bhagari and Chela.

The original name of the village was Sarawan, but due to a similarity of names the name became Sarai Khas after

== Communities ==
The community has many Sarai families, along with Bains, Gill, Kalyan, Mattu, Sandhu and Sanghera families.

Many natives from Sarai Khas settled abroad, notably in the UK, the US, and Canada.
