= Surrey North (federal electoral district) =

Former federal electoral district in British Columbia, Canada

British Columbia electoral district
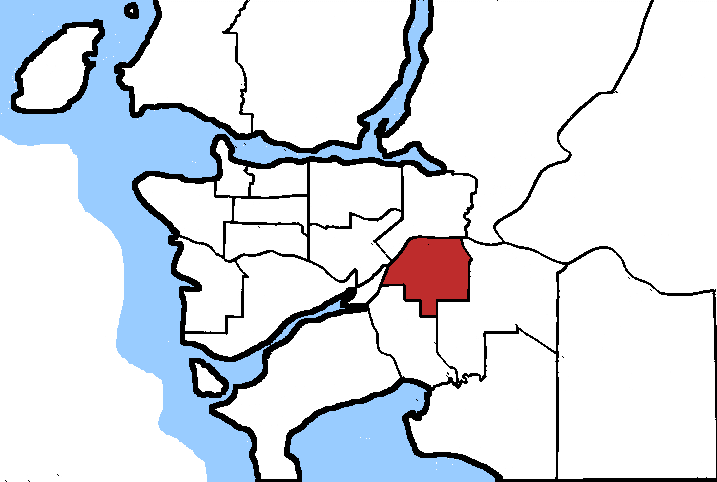
- Surrey North in relation to other federal electoral districts in Vancouver
- Coordinates: 49.191°N 122.847°W

Defunct federal electoral district
- Legislature: House of Commons
- District created: 1986
- District abolished: 2013
- First contested: 1988
- Last contested: 2011
- District webpage: profile, map

Demographics
- Population (2011): 125,963
- Electors (2011): 68,137
- Area (km²): 44.88
- Census division: Metro Vancouver
- Census subdivision: Surrey

Surrey North was a federal electoral district in British Columbia, Canada, that was represented in the House of Commons of Canada from 1988 to 2015. It covered the northern part of Surrey.

It was home to 106,904 residents in 2001, more than 46 percent of whom are immigrants—21 percent of residents are East Indian, the second-highest concentration in Canada. Most residents are employed in the manufacturing and service sectors, with an average family income of $50,445 and an unemployment rate of nine percent.

== Geography ==
Bounded by the Fraser River at the north and west, the riding stretched south to 88th Avenue, King George Highway, 120th Street, and 96th Avenue, and east to Fraser Highway and 152nd Street.

== History ==
The riding was formed in 1986 from portions of Surrey—White Rock—North Delta, and Fraser Valley West ridings. The riding was revised in 1996 and 2003.

=== Members of Parliament ===
Parliament	Years	Member	Party
Surrey North; Riding created from Surrey—White Rock—North Delta and Fraser Valley West
34th	1988–1993	Jim Karpoff	New Democratic
35th	1993–1997	Margaret Bridgman	Reform
36th	1997–2000	Chuck Cadman	Reform
36th	2000–2000	Chuck Cadman	Alliance
37th	2000–2003	Chuck Cadman	Alliance
37th	2003–2004	Chuck Cadman	Conservative
38th	2004–2005	Chuck Cadman	Independent
38th	2005–2006		Vacant
39th	2006–2008	Penny Priddy	New Democratic
40th	2008–2011	Dona Cadman	Conservative
41st	2011–2015	Jasbir Sandhu	New Democratic
Riding dissolved into Surrey Centre and Surrey—Newton

== Election results ==
2011 Canadian federal election
Party	Candidate	Votes	%	±%	Expenditures
New Democratic	Jasbir Sandhu	14,678	39.69	+3.49	$71,438.70
Conservative	Dona Cadman	13,181	35.64	–3.73	$78,455.64
Liberal	Shinder Purewal	6,797	18.38	+3.37	$79,658.25
Green	Bernadette Keenan	1,289	3.49	–2.04	$428.17
Independent	Jamie Scott	451	1.22	–	$1,656.00
Christian Heritage	Kevin Pielak	303	0.82	–0.57	$4,935.83
Libertarian	Norris Barens	284	0.77	–0.23	$563.33
Total valid votes/expense limit		36,983	99.28	–	$84,261.45
Total rejected ballots		267	0.72	–0.13	
Turnout		37,250	51.63	+0.07	
Eligible voters		72,145			
New Democratic gain from Conservative		Swing		+3.61	
Source: Elections Canada

2008 Canadian federal election
Party	Candidate	Votes	%	±%	Expenditures
Conservative	Dona Cadman	13,714	39.37	+11.73	$67,851.67
New Democratic	Rachid Arab	12,608	36.20	–9.50	$66,708.73
Liberal	Marc Muhammad	5,227	15.01	–4.58	$35,249.28
Green	Dan Kashagama	1,925	5.53	+2.83	none listed
Christian Heritage	Kevin Pielak	484	1.39	+0.24	$7,730.74
Libertarian	Alex Joehl	347	1.00	–	none listed
Independent	Bernadette Keenan	271	0.78	–	$10.00
Progressive Canadian	Nikolas Langlands	152	0.44	–0.18	$2,071.40
Canadian Action	Psam Frank	105	0.30	–	$200.00
Total valid votes/expense limit		34,833	99.15	–	$80,199.86
Total rejected ballots		297	0.85	+0.41	
Turnout		35,130	51.56	–3.67	
Eligible voters		68,137			
Conservative gain from New Democratic		Swing		+10.62	
Source: Elections Canada

2006 Canadian federal election
Party	Candidate	Votes	%	±%	Expenditures
New Democratic	Penny Priddy	16,307	45.69	+21.57	$65,968.77
Conservative	David Matta	9,864	27.64	+15.04	$70,255.02
Liberal	Surjit Kooner	6,991	19.59	+3.88	$48,253.37
Green	Roy Tyler Whyte	961	2.69	+0.78	$22.77
Independent	Nina Rivet	512	1.43	–	$3,957.78
Independent	John Baloun	420	1.18	–	$2,545.89
Christian Heritage	Kevin Pielak	411	1.15	–0.18	$8,562.51
Progressive Canadian	Nikolas Langlands	221	0.62	–	$2,247.11
Total valid votes/expense limit		35,687	99.56	–	$73,788.30
Total rejected ballots		156	0.44	–0.30	
Turnout		35,843	55.23	–0.17	
Eligible voters		64,897			
New Democratic gain from Independent		Swing		–	
Source: Elections Canada

2004 Canadian federal election
Party	Candidate	Votes	%	±%	Expenditures
Independent	Chuck Cadman	15,089	43.80	+43.00	$66,107.38
New Democratic	Jim Karpoff	8,312	24.13	+16.77	$45,944.46
Liberal	Dan Sheel	5,413	15.71	–13.16	$59,186.26
Conservative	Jasbir Singh Cheema	4,340	12.60	–48.32	$68,839.65
Green	Sunny Athwal	658	1.91	+0.35	$5,765.97
Christian Heritage	Gerhard Herwig	460	1.34	+0.53	$5,235.11
Communist	Joyce Holmes	93	0.27	–0.22	$512.34
Canadian Action	Roy Tyler Whyte	85	0.25	–	$238.91
Total valid votes/expense limit		34,450	99.27	–	$71,311.38
Total rejected ballots		254	0.73	+0.20	
Turnout		34,704	55.40	–0.02	
Eligible voters		62,644			
Independent gain from Alliance		Swing		–	
Chuck Cadman's share of the popular vote as an independent candidate declined by -12.31 from his share as the Canadian Alliance candidate in the 2000 election.
Source: Elections Canada

2000 Canadian federal election
Party	Candidate	Votes	%	±%	Expenditures
Alliance	Chuck Cadman	19,973	56.10	+9.30	$54,054
Liberal	Shinder Purewal	10,279	28.87	+0.71	$60,897
New Democratic	Art Hildebrant	2,619	7.36	–11.70	$6,657
Progressive Conservative	Dareck Faichuk	1,714	4.81	+1.65	$2,651
Green	Brian Lutes	556	1.56	+0.75	none listed
Independent	Gerhard Herwig	285	0.80	+0.22	$2,138
Communist	Tyler Campbell	174	0.49	–	$189
Total valid votes		35,600	99.46		
Total rejected ballots		192	0.54	–0.14	
Turnout		35,792	55.42	–5.59	
Eligible voters		64,583			
Alliance hold		Swing		+4.30	
Source: Elections Canada

1997 Canadian federal election
Party	Candidate	Votes	%	±%	Expenditures
Reform	Chuck Cadman	16,158	46.80	+9.86	$56,674
Liberal	Clayton J. Campbell	9,723	28.16	+1.80	$55,219
New Democratic	Judy Villeneuve	6,579	19.06	+1.97	$44,861
Progressive Conservative	David Sikal	1,093	3.17	–10.66	$11,791
Christian Heritage	Allen Gray	291	0.84	–0.65	$1,573
Green	Suzanne Shephard	280	0.81	–	none listed
Independent	Donald I. Knight	200	0.58	–	$10,505
Canadian Action	Vlad Marjanovic	87	0.25	–	$2,335
Natural Law	Anthony F. Quance	70	0.20	–0.42	none listed
Marxist–Leninist	Mardi Couture	42	0.12	–	none listed
Total valid votes		34,523	99.33		
Total rejected ballots		234	0.67	+0.10	
Turnout		34,757	61.01	–2.32	
Eligible voters		56,970			
Reform hold		Swing		+4.03	
Source: Elections Canada

1993 Canadian federal election
Party	Candidate	Votes	%	±%
Reform	Margaret Bridgman	22,390	36.94	+34.63
Liberal	Prem S. Vinning	15,977	26.36	+1.47
New Democratic	Jim Karpoff	10,355	17.08	–19.92
Progressive Conservative	Cliff Blair	8,381	13.83	–18.97
National	Shirley Ann Stonier	2,014	3.32	–
Christian Heritage	Bill Stilwell	907	1.50	–0.14
Natural Law	Anthony F. Quance	376	0.62	–
Independent	Braden Karringten	128	0.21	–
Commonwealth of Canada	Louise J. Belanger	84	0.14	–
Total valid votes		60,612	99.43	
Total rejected ballots		349	0.57	+0.20
Turnout		60,961	63.33	–11.91
Eligible voters		96,255		
Reform gain from New Democratic		Swing		+27.28
Source: Elections Canada

1988 Canadian federal election
Party	Candidate	Votes	%	±%
New Democratic	Jim Karpoff	19,940	37.01	–
Progressive Conservative	Cliff Blair	17,674	32.80	–
Liberal	Don Ross	13,412	24.89	–
Reform	Ray Herd	1,247	2.31	–
Christian Heritage	Bill Stilwell	883	1.64	–
Libertarian	Jack Boulogne	247	0.46	–
Rhinoceros	Toney Wiezoreck	219	0.41	–
Green	Child Buffalo	156	0.29	–
Independent	Harbhajan Cheema	103	0.19	–
Total valid votes		53,881	99.63	
Total rejected ballots		200	0.37	–
Turnout		54,081	75.24	–
Eligible voters		71,877		
Source: Elections Canada

== See also ==
- List of Canadian electoral districts
- Historical federal electoral districts of Canada
