= Margaret Bridgman =

Canadian politician (1940–2009)

Member of Parliament for Surrey North
- In office October 25, 1993 – June 2, 1997
- Preceded by: Jim Karpoff
- Succeeded by: Chuck Cadman

Personal details
- Born: January 10, 1940 Kimberley, British Columbia, Canada
- Died: January 4, 2009 (aged 68) Surrey, British Columbia, Canada
- Cause of death: Lung cancer
- Party: Reform Party of Canada
- Occupation: Police Constable; Nurse; Nurse administrator

Margaret L. Bridgman (January 10, 1940 – January 4, 2009) was a Canadian politician. Bridgman was a Member of Parliament from 1993 to 1997, representing the Canadian, federal electoral district of Surrey North in Surrey, British Columbia.

Born in Kimberley, British Columbia, she was elected to Parliament for Surrey North in the 1993 election as a candidate of the Reform Party of Canada.

In 2001, Bridgman unsuccessfully ran for the Reform Party of British Columbia in the riding of Surrey-Newton.

Before entering politics, Bridgman was a police constable, a nurse, and a nurse administrator.

As a young woman, Bridgman lived and worked in London, United Kingdom, as a police constable (traffic bobby). Subsequently, she trained in London as a psychiatric nurse, becoming a Registered Nurse (RN) and a Psychiatric Nurse (PN) before returning to Canada. Bridgman went on to earn the Director of Nursing designation from the University of Saskatchewan, rising to become a nurse administrator.

In September 1993, the designated Reform Party candidate for Surrey North resigned his nomination. Bridgman was President of the Surrey North Reform Party Constituency Association, and she was selected to run as the Reform Party candidate. On October 25, 1993, Margaret Bridgman was elected the Member of Parliament for Surrey North, unseating the incumbent with a plurality of 6413 votes. Prior to Bridgman's landmark victory, Surrey North and its predecessor ridings had been held either by the New Democratic Party or the Progressive Conservative Party since 1958.

Bridgman served as the Reform Party Critic on Health and Assistant Critic on Indian Affairs and Northern Development. She sat as the Reform Party member of the House of Commons Standing Committees on Health and on Aboriginal Affairs and Northern Development, during the 35th Parliament. In her maiden speech in the House of Commons, Bridgman focused on the need for more effective and cost-conscious funding of health care in Canada. Bridgman's interventions in the House of Commons ranged from remarks on health care and Indian Affairs to young offenders, old age security, and the spending priorities of the Canadian parliament.

In 1997, Bridgman was successfully challenged for the Reform Party nomination by Chuck Cadman. Bridgman opted not to run as an independent in the 1997 general election, and she did not run again in a federal electoral race.

Following the 1997 election, Bridgman returned to nursing in Surrey, British Columbia. After a long illness, Margaret Bridgman died of lung cancer at home on January 4, 2009.
