= Penny Priddy =

Canadian politician

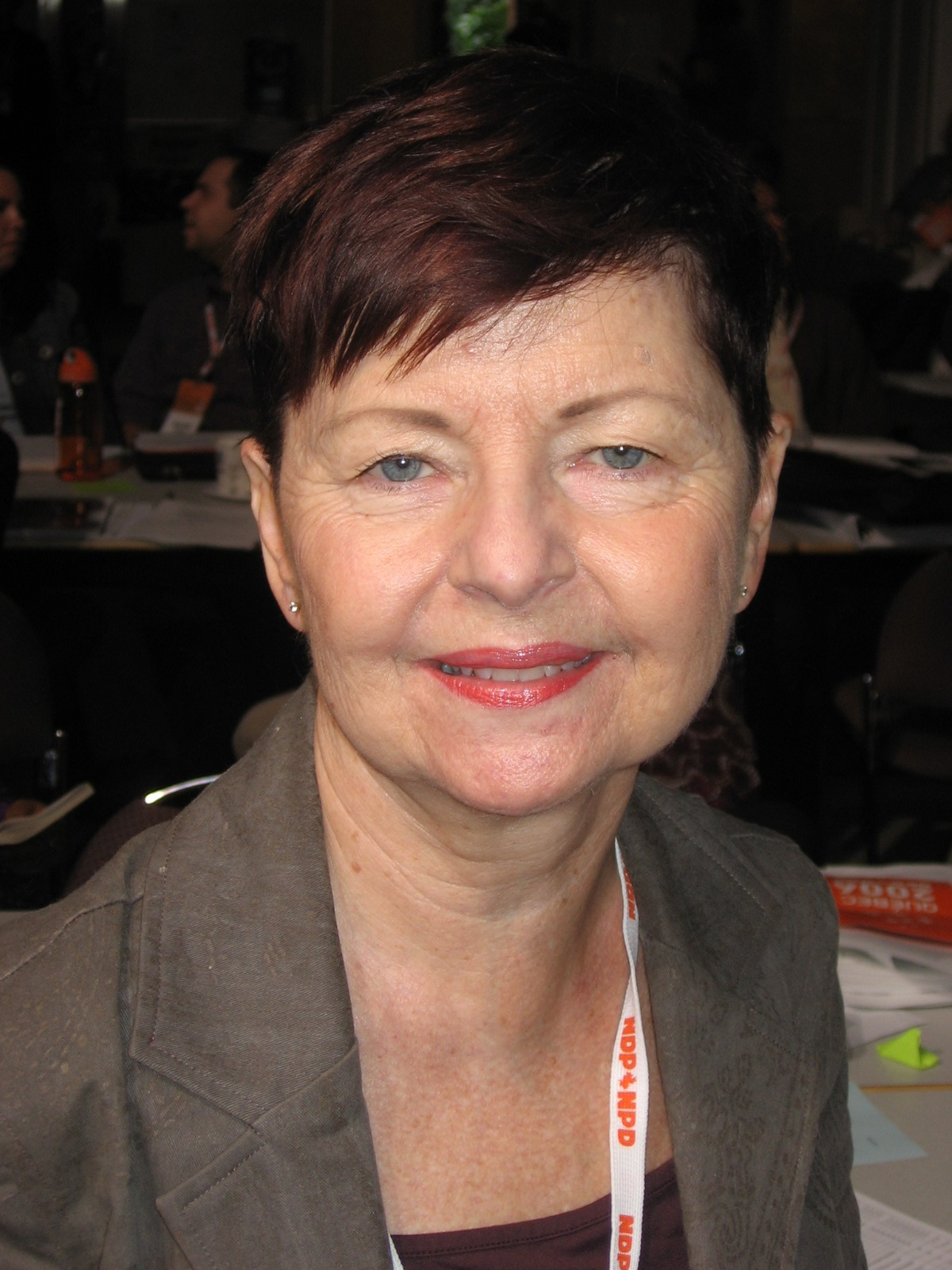

Member of Parliament for Surrey North
- In office January 23, 2006 – October 14, 2008
- Preceded by: Chuck Cadman
- Succeeded by: Dona Cadman

Surrey City Councillor
- In office 2002–2005

Member of the British Columbia Legislative Assembly for Surrey-Newton
- In office October 17, 1991 – May 16, 2001
- Preceded by: Rita Johnston
- Succeeded by: Tony Bhullar

Minister of Women's Equality of British Columbia
- In office November 5, 1991 – February 22, 1996
- Premier: Michael Harcourt
- Preceded by: Position established
- Succeeded by: Sue Hammell

Minister of Labour of British Columbia
- In office February 28, 1996 – June 17, 1996
- Premier: Glen Clark
- Preceded by: Dan Miller
- Succeeded by: Moe Sihota

Minister of Small Business, Tourism and Culture of British Columbia
- In office June 17, 1996 – September 23, 1996
- Premier: Glen Clark
- Preceded by: Bill Barlee
- Succeeded by: Jan Pullinger

Minister of Children and Families of British Columbia
- In office September 23, 1996 – February 18, 1998
- Premier: Glen Clark
- Preceded by: Position established
- Succeeded by: Lois Boone

Minister of Health and Minister Responsible for Seniors of British Columbia
- In office February 18, 1998 – February 24, 2000
- Premier: Glen Clark; Dan Miller
- Preceded by: Joy MacPhail
- Succeeded by: Michael Farnworth

Minister of Education of British Columbia
- In office February 29, 2000 – November 1, 2000
- Premier: Ujjal Dosanjh
- Preceded by: Gordon Wilson
- Succeeded by: Joy MacPhail

Personal details
- Born: March 5, 1944 (age 82) Toronto, Ontario
- Party: New Democratic Party
- Spouse: Robert Priddy
- Profession: Nurse

Penny Priddy (born March 5, 1944) is a politician from British Columbia (BC), Canada. She served as member of Parliament (MP) from 2006 to 2008, representing the electoral district of Surrey North in the House of Commons of Canada. Prior to that, she was a Surrey city councillor (2002–2005), a member of the BC legislature representing Surrey-Newton (1991–2001), and a trustee with the Surrey School District (1986–1991). She is the only woman in Canadian history to be elected to school board, city council, a provincial legislature and the House of Commons.

During her time in the BC legislature, she served in several cabinet posts in the British Columbia New Democratic Party (BC NDP) governments of Mike Harcourt, Glen Clark, Dan Miller and Ujjal Dosanjh, including as minister of labour, health and education.

== Biography ==
Born in Toronto, Ontario, she was originally a nurse before moving to Surrey, British Columbia with her husband in 1981, where she worked as a nursing educator. She was first elected to the Surrey School District as a trustee in 1986 under the Surrey Municipal Electors slate, before becoming part of the NDP-affiliated Surrey Civic Electors.

After five years as a school trustee, she ran in the 1991 provincial election as a BC NDP candidate in Surrey-Newton, defeating Premier Rita Johnston to win the riding. She was subsequently named to the cabinet that November, serving as Minister of Women's Equality during the premiership of Mike Harcourt.

After Glen Clark took over as premier in February 1996, Priddy was appointed Minister of Labour. She was re-elected in the May 1996 provincial election, and briefly assumed the Small Business, Tourism and Culture portfolio that June. (Note: Priddy took a temporary leave of absence while fighting breast cancer from June to September 1996. Dan Miller served as acting Minister of Small Business, Tourism and Culture during this time.) She was re-assigned as Minister of Children and Families in September 1996, before assuming the roles of Minister of Health and Minister Responsible for Seniors in February 1998. She retained both portfolios during Dan Miller's term as premier and interim NDP leader.

She was named Minister of Education in February 2000 by new Premier Ujjal Dosanjh. With the NDP trailing in the polls, she announced on October 30, 2000 that she would not run in the following year's provincial election, and was dropped from the cabinet a few days later. She returned to politics in 2002 when she was elected to Surrey City Council, serving one term as councillor.

Following the death of independent Surrey North MP Chuck Cadman, Priddy entered the race for the riding as a federal NDP candidate in the 2006 election. Priddy had been friends with Cadman and his wife Dona for many years despite their sharp political differences, and later received Dona Cadman's endorsement for the Surrey North seat. Priddy went on to defeat Conservative candidate David Matta and became the riding's MP, serving as the NDP's health critic from 2006 to 2007, then as the party's public safety critic and assistant justice critic from 2007 to 2008. She declined to run in the 2008 federal election.

== Personal life and other activities ==
She and her husband Robert have two adult children. She was diagnosed with breast cancer in December 1995, and underwent surgery and radiation therapy shortly thereafter. She then went through chemotherapy after the 1996 provincial election, and made a full recovery.

In 2001, Priddy was awarded an honorary Doctorate of Law degree from Kwantlen University College for her service to the people of BC.

She is a member of the Canadian Women Voters Congress, Canadian Women of Municipal Government, and the Heritage Advisory Commission for the City of Surrey. She is a past co-chair of the National Women's Campaign School, and served for three terms as a municipal representative to the board of directors for the Vancouver Fraser Port Authority from 2011 to 2020.
