= Results of the 2025 Canadian federal election by riding =

- 28 April 2025

343 seats in the House of Commons

The following is a list of results of the 2025 Canadian federal election, by riding.

7 April 2025 was the last day for candidates to apply, with the final list being announced 9 April 2025. There were 343 ridings on the ballot in this election, five more than in 2021. The Longest Ballot Committee targeted the riding of Carleton, held by Conservative leader Pierre Poilievre.

On election night, election workers phone in their results to the returning officer and read off the results to staff who enter the results into the secure reporting system; Elections Canada updates the preliminary results on its website with this information. Validated results are produced by the returning officer checking each poll's paperwork to confirm that the correct numbers were entered into the reporting system on election night, a process that is usually completed within a week; ridings with remote communities may take longer.

Ridings with a winning margin less than 1/1000 of total votes cast receive an automatic judicial recount. Three ridings had margins small enough to trigger a recount: Terra Nova—The Peninsulas (Newfoundland and Labrador), Terrebonne (Quebec), and Milton East—Halton Hills South (Ontario); the last two reported one winner in election night results but a different winner when results were validated. A fourth recount was granted in Windsor—Tecumseh—Lakeshore following an application by Liberal incumbent Irek Kusmierczyk, who finished second in the preliminary and validated results. The recount overturned the results in Terra Nova—The Peninsulas and Terrebonne, while confirming the winner from the validated results in the other two.

On 7 May 2025, Elections Canada announced that 822 national special ballots belonging to 74 ridings were kept at the Coquitlam—Port Coquitlam returning office past the deadline for returning them to national headquarters, making them ineligible to be legally counted toward the election; the disqualified ballots did not affect the outcome of any race.

== Abbreviations guide ==
- APP – Animal Protection Party of Canada
- BQ – Bloc Québécois
- Cent. – Centrist Party of Canada
- CFP – Canadian Future Party
- CHP – Christian Heritage Party
- Comm. – Communist Party
- Conservative – Conservative Party
- Green – Green Party
- Ind. – Independent
- Liberal – Liberal Party
- Libert. – Libertarian Party
- Mar. – Marijuana Party
- M-L – Marxist–Leninist Party
- NA – No affiliation (Note: No Affiliation is used by Elections Canada when a candidate leaves the Party Affiliation entry blank on his or her registration.)
- NDP – New Democratic Party
- PPC – People's Party of Canada
- Rhino. – Parti Rhinocéros Party
- UP – United Party of Canada (Note: Not related to earlier parties with the same name in 2009–2016 and 2018–2020.)

== Candidates and results ==
Note: Candidates' names are as listed by Elections Canada.
Vote totals are those validated by Elections Canada; recounts are noted as judicially certified. Media coverage is usually based on preliminary results and often differs from the final numbers.
bold indicates party leader or co-leader
† = not seeking re-election
‡ = running for re-election in different riding
§ = incumbent was defeated for nomination
^{$} = incumbent was announced as nominated by their party but later chose not to run again
^{¢} = incumbent announced they would not run again but later chose to reoffer
^{±} = incumbent had nomination revoked by party

=== Newfoundland and Labrador ===
Electoral district	Candidates					Incumbent
Electoral district	Liberal	Conservative	NDP	Green	Other	Incumbent
Avalon	Paul Connors; 27,563; 58.6%	Steve Kent; 16,953; 36.0%	Judy Vanta; 2,284; 4.9%		Alexander Tilley (Rhino.); 230; 0.5%	Ken McDonald†
Cape Spear	Tom Osborne; 31,388; 68.3%	Corey Curtis; 11,844; 25.8%	Brenda Walsh; 2,446; 5.3%	Kaelem Tingate; 140; 0.3%	Mike Peach (APP); 170; 0.4%	Seamus O'Regan^{$} St. John's South—Mount Pearl
Central Newfoundland	Lynette Powell; 17,696; 43.5%	Clifford Small; 21,975; 54.1%	Darian Vincent; 965; 2.4%			Clifford Small; Coast of Bays—Central—Notre Dame
Labrador	Philip Earle; 5,811; 51.5%	Ella Wallace; 4,709; 41.7%	Marius Normore; 764; 6.8%			Yvonne Jones†
Long Range Mountains	Don Bradshaw; 19,726; 42.7%	Carol Anstey; 23,232; 50.3%	Sarah Parsons; 2,011; 4.4%		Robbie Coles (Ind.); 637 1.4%	Gudie Hutchings^{$}
Long Range Mountains	Don Bradshaw; 19,726; 42.7%	Carol Anstey; 23,232; 50.3%	Sarah Parsons; 2,011; 4.4%		Pamela Geiger (PPC); 537 1.2%	Gudie Hutchings^{$}
St. John's East	Joanne Thompson; 28,681; 62.3%	David Brazil; 11,941; 25.9%	Mary Shortall; 5,172; 11.2%	Otis Crandell; 159; 0.3%	Samuel Crête (Comm.); 98; 0.2%	Joanne Thompson
Terra Nova—The Peninsulas (judicially certified)	Anthony Germain; 19,593; 47.9%	Jonathan Rowe; 19,605; 48.0%	Liam Ryan; 1,677; 4.1%			Churence Rogers†; Bonavista—Burin—Trinity

=== Prince Edward Island ===
Electoral district	Candidates						Incumbent
Electoral district	Liberal	Conservative	NDP	Green	PPC	Independent	Incumbent
Cardigan	Kent MacDonald; 14,404; 57.0%	James Aylward; 9,442; 37.4%	Lynne Thiele; 505; 2.0%	Maria Rodriguez; 326; 1.3%	Adam Harding; 180; 0.7%	Wayne Phelan; 404; 1.6%	Lawrence MacAulay†
Charlottetown	Sean Casey; 13,656; 64.8%	Natalie Jameson; 6,139; 29.1%	Joe Byrne; 906; 4.3%	Daniel Cousins; 257; 1.2%	Robert Lucas; 131; 0.6%		Sean Casey
Egmont	Bobby Morrissey; 12,466; 51.9%	Logan McLellan; 10,419; 43.4%	Carol Rybinski; 585; 2.4%	Ranald MacFarlane; 538; 2.2%			Bobby Morrissey
Malpeque	Heath MacDonald; 15,485; 57.6%	Jamie Fox; 9,846; 36.6%	Cassie Mackay; 371; 1.4%	Anna Keenan; 1,049; 3.9%	Hilda Baughan; 132; 0.5%		Heath MacDonald

=== Nova Scotia ===
Electoral district	Candidates						Incumbent
Electoral district	Liberal	Conservative	NDP	Green	PPC	Other	Incumbent
Acadie—Annapolis	Ronnie LeBlanc; 22,491; 46.6%	Chris d'Entremont; 23,024; 47.7%	Ingrid Deon; 1,768; 3.7%	Matthew Piggott; 583; 1.2%	James Strange; 432; 0.9%		Chris d'Entremont; West Nova
Cape Breton—Canso—Antigonish	Jaime Battiste; 24,908; 51.6%	Allan MacMaster; 20,870; 43.2%	Joanna Clark; 1,930; 4.0%		Ryan Smyth; 333; 0.7%	Rebecca Wall (Ind.); 237; 0.5%	Mike Kelloway‡ Cape Breton—Canso (Running in Sydney—Glace Bay)
Central Nova	Sean Fraser; 26,078; 51.9%	Brycen Jenkins; 21,465; 42.7%	Jesiah MacDonald; 1,649; 3.3%	Gerald Romsa; 455; 0.9%	Charlie MacEachern; 331; 0.7%	Alexander MacKenzie (Ind.); 235; 0.5%	Sean Fraser^{¢}
Cumberland—Colchester	Alana Hirtle; 23,929; 48.3%	Stephen Ellis; 22,701; 45.8%	Larry Duchesne; 1,873; 3.8%	Kelly-Ann Callaghan; 694; 1.4%	Paul Church; 333; 0.7%		Stephen Ellis
Dartmouth—Cole Harbour	Darren Fisher; 40,367; 67.7%	Isabelle Obeid; 13,557; 22.7%	Keith Morrison; 4,201; 7.0%	Rana Zaman; 628; 1.1%	Michelle Lindsay; 750; 1.3%	Joseph Shea (Libert.); 131; 0.2%	Darren Fisher
Halifax	Shannon Miedema; 32,886; 63.0%	Mark Boudreau; 9,939; 19.1%	Lisa Roberts; 8,642; 16.6%	Amethyste Hamel-Gregory; 422; 0.8%	Maricar Aliasut; 271; 0.5%		Vacant^{$}
Halifax West	Lena Metlege Diab; 36,200; 65.6%	Rob Batherson; 15,020; 27.2%	Rae Tench; 3,083; 5.6%	Ron G. Parker; 497; 0.9%	Adam LeRue; 384; 0.7%		Lena Metlege Diab
Kings—Hants	Kody Blois; 35,836; 60.6%	Joel Hirtle; 19,773; 33.4%	Paul Doerr; 2,154; 3.6%	Karen Beazley; 825; 1.4%	Alexander Cargill; 591; 1.0%		Kody Blois
Sackville—Bedford—Preston	Braedon Clark; 36,062; 62.0%	Dave Carroll; 18,860; 32.4%	Isaac Wilson; 2,324; 4.0%	Andre Anderson; 526; 0.9%	Ryan Slaney; 418; 0.7%		Darrell Samson†; Sackville—Preston—Chezzetcook
South Shore—St. Margarets	Jessica Fancy-Landry; 27,831; 54.9%	Rick Perkins; 20,864; 41.1%		Mark Embrett; 818; 1.6%	Patrick Shea Boyd; 698; 1.4%	Hayden Henderson (Ind.); 500; 1.0%	Rick Perkins
Sydney—Glace Bay	Mike Kelloway; 25,766; 54.6%	Anna Manley; 17,978; 38.1%	Kimberly Losier; 1,789; 3.8%		Jeffrey Evely; 589; 1.2%	Nik Boisvert (M-L); 85 0.2%	Jaime Battiste‡ Sydney—Victoria (Running in Cape Breton—Canso—Antigonish)
Sydney—Glace Bay	Mike Kelloway; 25,766; 54.6%	Anna Manley; 17,978; 38.1%	Kimberly Losier; 1,789; 3.8%		Jeffrey Evely; 589; 1.2%	Chris Gallant (CFP); 169 0.4%	Jaime Battiste‡ Sydney—Victoria (Running in Cape Breton—Canso—Antigonish)
Sydney—Glace Bay	Mike Kelloway; 25,766; 54.6%	Anna Manley; 17,978; 38.1%	Kimberly Losier; 1,789; 3.8%		Jeffrey Evely; 589; 1.2%	Michael Pittman (Libert.); 189 0.4%	Jaime Battiste‡ Sydney—Victoria (Running in Cape Breton—Canso—Antigonish)
Sydney—Glace Bay	Mike Kelloway; 25,766; 54.6%	Anna Manley; 17,978; 38.1%	Kimberly Losier; 1,789; 3.8%		Jeffrey Evely; 589; 1.2%	Joe Ward (Ind.); 601 1.3%	Jaime Battiste‡ Sydney—Victoria (Running in Cape Breton—Canso—Antigonish)

=== New Brunswick ===
Electoral district	Candidates						Incumbent
Electoral district	Liberal	Conservative	NDP	Green	PPC	Other	Incumbent
Acadie—Bathurst	Serge Cormier; 32,556; 67.5%	James Brown; 12,541; 26.0%	Ty Boulay; 2,108; 4.4%		Randi Rachelle Raynard; 1,043; 2.2%		Serge Cormier
Beauséjour	Dominic LeBlanc; 36,139; 60.6%	Nathalie Vautour; 19,862; 33.3%	Alex Gagne; 1,448; 2.4%	Josh Shaddick; 1,291; 2.2%	Eddie Cornell; 503; 0.8%	Donna Allen (Libert.); 388; 0.7%	Dominic LeBlanc
Fredericton—Oromocto	David Myles; 30,750; 61.3%	Brian Macdonald; 16,200; 32.3%	Nicki Lyons-MacFarlane; 908; 1.8%	Pam Allen-Leblanc; 1,568; 3.1%	Heather Michaud; 208; 0.4%	**Dominic Cardy** (CFP); 345 0.7%	Jenica Atwin†; Fredericton
Fredericton—Oromocto	David Myles; 30,750; 61.3%	Brian Macdonald; 16,200; 32.3%	Nicki Lyons-MacFarlane; 908; 1.8%	Pam Allen-Leblanc; 1,568; 3.1%	Heather Michaud; 208; 0.4%	Brandon Ellis (Cent.); 44 0.1%	Jenica Atwin†; Fredericton
Fredericton—Oromocto	David Myles; 30,750; 61.3%	Brian Macdonald; 16,200; 32.3%	Nicki Lyons-MacFarlane; 908; 1.8%	Pam Allen-Leblanc; 1,568; 3.1%	Heather Michaud; 208; 0.4%	June Patterson (Comm.); 146 0.3%	Jenica Atwin†; Fredericton
Fundy Royal	Bill Kudla; 19,103; 40.1%	Rob Moore; 25,411; 53.4%	Cindy Andrie; 1,507; 3.2%	Hans Johnsen; 961; 2.0%	Alastair MacFarlane; 629; 1.3%		Rob Moore
Madawaska—Restigouche	Guillaume Deschênes-Thériault; 22,720; 55.2%	Michel Morin; 16,320; 39.6%	Daisy Petersen; 1,251; 3.0%		Nancy Mercier; 887; 2.2%		René Arseneault^{$}
Miramichi—Grand Lake	Lisa Harris; 18,037; 47.1%	Mike Dawson; 18,421; 48.2%	Josh Floyd; 968; 2.5%	Matthew Ian Clark; 831; 2.2%			Jake Stewart^{$}
Moncton—Dieppe	Ginette Petitpas Taylor; 30,215; 63.0%	Jocelyn Dionne; 14,974; 31.2%	Serge Landry; 1,775; 3.7%	Marshall Dunn; 994; 2.1%			Ginette Petitpas Taylor; Moncton—Riverview—Dieppe
Saint John—Kennebecasis	Wayne Long; 26,129; 58.1%	Melissa Young; 16,787; 37.3%	Armand Cormier; 1,206; 2.7%	David MacFarquhar; 737; 1.6%		Austin Venedam (Libert.); 108; 0.2%	Wayne Long^{¢}
Saint John—St. Croix	Karen Ludwig; 20,784; 41.5%	John Williamson; 26,591; 53.1%	Andrew Hill; 1,643; 3.3%	Gerald Irish; 794; 1.6%		Keith Tays (Libert.); 280; 0.6%	John Williamson; New Brunswick Southwest
Tobique—Mactaquac	Julian Moulton; 14,226; 35.9%	Richard Bragdon; 23,322; 58.8%	Michael John Winter; 812; 2.0%	Liam MacDougall; 806; 2.0%	Vern Brundle; 501; 1.3%		Richard Bragdon

=== Quebec ===
==== Eastern Quebec ====
Electoral district	Candidates								Incumbent
Electoral district	Liberal	Conservative	BQ	NDP	Green	PPC	Rhinoceros	Independent	Incumbent
Bellechasse—Les Etchemins—Lévis	Glenn O'Farrell; 18,642; 28.5%	Dominique Vien; 32,097; 49.1%	Gaby Breton; 12,244; 18.7%	Marie-Philippe Gagnon Gauthier; 1,621; 2.5%		Mario Fréchette; 794; 1.2%			Dominique Vien
Côte-du-Sud—Rivière-du-Loup—Kataskomiq—Témiscouata	Rémi Massé; 19,097; 30.3%	Bernard Généreux; 28,873; 45.8%	Diane Sénécal; 12,598; 20.0%	Iseult L'Heureux Hubert; 1,072; 1.7%	Alexie Plourde; 682; 1.1%	Jean-François Morin; 464; 0.7%	Thibaud Mony; 206; 0.3%		Bernard Généreux; Montmagny—L'Islet—Kamouraska—Rivière-du-Loup
Gaspésie—Les Îles-de-la-Madeleine—Listuguj	Diane Lebouthillier; 21,817; 38.3%	Jean-Pierre Pigeon; 7,047; 12.4%	Alexis Deschênes; 26,091; 45.8%	Denise Giroux; 1,005; 1.8%		Christian Rioux; 452; 0.8%	Shawn Grenier; 572; 1.0%		Diane Lebouthillier; Gaspésie—Les Îles-de-la-Madeleine
Rimouski—La Matapédia	Alexander Reford; 19,201; 35.5%	Nancy Joannette; 7,324; 13.6%	Maxime Blanchette-Joncas; 24,947; 46.2%	Salomé Salvain; 974; 1.8%		Taraneh Javanbakht; 338; 0.6%	Lysane Picker-Paquin; 295; 0.5%	Raphaël Arsenault; 242 0.4%	Kristina Michaud†; Avignon—La Mitis—Matane—Matapédia
Rimouski—La Matapédia	Alexander Reford; 19,201; 35.5%	Nancy Joannette; 7,324; 13.6%	Maxime Blanchette-Joncas; 24,947; 46.2%	Salomé Salvain; 974; 1.8%		Taraneh Javanbakht; 338; 0.6%	Lysane Picker-Paquin; 295; 0.5%	Noémi Bureau-Civil; 620 1.1%	Merged District
Rimouski—La Matapédia	Alexander Reford; 19,201; 35.5%	Nancy Joannette; 7,324; 13.6%	Maxime Blanchette-Joncas; 24,947; 46.2%	Salomé Salvain; 974; 1.8%		Taraneh Javanbakht; 338; 0.6%	Lysane Picker-Paquin; 295; 0.5%	Tommy Lefebvre; 99 0.2%	Maxime Blanchette-Joncas; Rimouski-Neigette—Témiscouata—Les Basques

==== Côte-Nord and Saguenay ====
Electoral district	Candidates							Incumbent
Electoral district	Liberal	Conservative	BQ	NDP	Green	PPC	Other	Incumbent
Chicoutimi—Le Fjord	Stéphane Proulx; 15,820; 31.1%	Richard Martel; 17,356; 34.1%	Marc St-Hilaire; 15,857; 31.2%	Raphaël Émond; 991; 1.9%	Yves Laporte; 476; 0.9%	François Sabourin; 339; 0.7%		Richard Martel
Côte-Nord—Kawawachikamach—Nitassinan	Kevin Coutu; 10,185; 27.4%	Mélanie Dorion; 9,365; 25.2%	Marilène Gill; 16,243; 43.7%	Marika Lalime; 640; 1.7%			Gilles Babin (NA); 193 0.5%	Marilène Gill; Manicouagan
Côte-Nord—Kawawachikamach—Nitassinan	Kevin Coutu; 10,185; 27.4%	Mélanie Dorion; 9,365; 25.2%	Marilène Gill; 16,243; 43.7%	Marika Lalime; 640; 1.7%			Sébastien Beaulieu (Rhino.); 557 1.5%	Marilène Gill; Manicouagan
Jonquière	William Van Tassel; 13,172; 26.0%	Fanny Boulanger; 15,314; 30.2%	Mario Simard; 20,247; 40.0%	Lise Garon; 932; 1.8%	Marie-Josée Yelle; 448; 0.9%	Patrick Gaudreault; 516; 1.0%		Mario Simard
Lac-Saint-Jean	Denis Lemieux; 12,536; 26.3%	Dave Blackburn; 11,792; 24.7%	Alexis Brunelle-Duceppe; 22,069; 46.2%	Hugues Boily-Maltais; 819; 1.7%		Lorie Bouchard; 540; 1.1%		Alexis Brunelle-Duceppe
Montmorency—Charlevoix	Alex Ouellet-Bélanger; 17,101; 28.8%	Gabriel Hardy; 20,494; 34.5%	Caroline Desbiens; 19,970; 33.6%	Gérard Briand; 905; 1.5%	Élie Prud'Homme-Tessier; 580; 1.0%	Bart Cortenbach; 357; 0.6%		Caroline Desbiens; Beauport—Côte-de-Beaupré—Île d'Orléans—Charlevoix

==== Quebec City Region ====
Electoral district	Candidates							Incumbent
Electoral district	Liberal	Conservative	BQ	NDP	Green	PPC	Other	Incumbent
Beauport—Limoilou	Steeve Lavoie; 21,858; 35.6%	Hugo Langlois; 18,492; 30.1%	Julie Vignola; 17,558; 28.6%	Raymond Côté; 2,095; 3.4%	Dalila Elhak; 924; 1.5%	Andrée Massicotte; 396; 0.6%	Claude Moreau (M-L); 95; 0.2%	Julie Vignola
Charlesbourg—Haute-Saint-Charles	Louis Bellemare; 22,597; 34.6%	Pierre Paul-Hus; 27,698; 42.4%	Bladimir Laborit Infante; 12,346; 18.9%	Dominique Harrisson; 1,752; 2.7%		Paul Cyr; 516; 0.8%	Danick Bisson (Ind.); 357; 0.5%	Pierre Paul-Hus
Louis-Hébert	Joël Lightbound; 33,512; 55.4%	Claude Dussault; 12,164; 20.1%	Valérie Savard; 12,897; 21.3%	Jean-Paul Lussiaà-Berdou; 1,540; 2.5%		Vatthana Maholy; 332; 0.5%		Joël Lightbound
Louis-Saint-Laurent—Akiawenhrahk	Rhode-Malaure Pierre; 21,693; 33.0%	Gérard Deltell; 29,525; 44.9%	Martin Trudel; 12,465; 18.9%	Colette Ducharme; 1,607; 2.4%		Anthony Leclerc; 527; 0.8%		Gérard Deltell; Louis-Saint-Laurent
Québec Centre	Jean-Yves Duclos; 27,880; 49.5%		Simon Bérubé; 20,203; 35.9%	Tommy Bureau; 4,400; 7.8%		Daniel Brisson; 2,818; 5.0%	Patrick Kerr (Ind.); 1,018; 1.8%	Jean-Yves Duclos; Québec

==== Central Quebec ====
Electoral district	Candidates							Incumbent
Electoral district	Liberal	Conservative	BQ	NDP	Green	PPC	Other	Incumbent
Bécancour—Nicolet—Saurel—Alnôbak	Pierre Tousignant; 14,813; 27.3%	Michel Plourde; 11,717; 21.6%	Louis Plamondon; 25,506; 47.0%	Tommy Gagnon; 1,112; 2.0%	Yanick Lapierre; 738; 1.4%	Lara Stillo; 432; 0.8%		Louis Plamondon; Bécancour—Nicolet—Saurel
Berthier—Maskinongé	Stéphane Bilodeau; 15,056; 24.3%	Peter Saliba; 10,641; 17.2%	Yves Perron; 21,676; 35.0%	Ruth Ellen Brosseau; 13,457; 21.7%	Daniel Simon; 551; 0.9%	Elia Gomez-Gnali; 575; 0.9%		Yves Perron
Joliette—Manawan	Marc Allaire; 17,890; 31.3%	Pascal Bapfou Vozang Siewe; 8,721; 15.2%	Gabriel Ste-Marie; 28,196; 49.3%	Vanessa Gordon; 1,408; 2.5%	Érica Poirier; 1,014; 1.8%			Gabriel Ste-Marie; Joliette
Lévis—Lotbinière	Ghislain Daigle; 20,549; 29.4%	Jacques Gourde; 33,312; 47.7%	Pierre Julien; 13,627; 19.5%	Molly Cornish; 1,635; 2.3%		Pier-Olivier Roy; 698; 1.0%		Jacques Gourde
Montcalm	Fatima Badran; 15,769; 26.9%	Jean-Sébastien Lepage; 13,589; 23.2%	Luc Thériault; 27,268; 46.6%	Denis Perreault; 1,893; 3.2%				Luc Thériault
Portneuf—Jacques-Cartier	Antonin Leroux; 18,865; 29.0%	Joël Godin; 32,184; 49.6%	Christian Hébert; 11,606; 17.9%	Félix Couture; 1,034; 1.6%	Johann Queffelec; 728; 1.1%	Simon Frenette; 524; 0.8%		Joël Godin
Repentigny	Pierre Richard Thomas; 24,419; 38.8%	Charles Champagne; 9,583; 15.2%	Patrick Bonin; 26,593; 42.2%	Nathalie Gagnon; 1,722; 2.7%		Benoit Lanoue; 384; 0.6%	Ednal Marc (Ind.); 314; 0.5%	Monique Pauzé†
Saint-Maurice—Champlain	François-Philippe Champagne; 31,095; 50.0%	Pierre-Augustin Allard; 15,321; 24.6%	Thierry Bilodeau; 13,190; 21.2%	Nathalie Garceau; 1,224; 2.0%	Marie-Claude Gaudet; 704; 1.1%	David Rioux; 455; 0.7%	Dji-Pé Frazer (Rhino.); 251; 0.4%	François-Philippe Champagne
Trois-Rivières	Caroline Desrochers; 25,147; 41.0%	Yves Levesque; 16,708; 27.2%	René Villemure; 16,921; 27.6%	Matthew Sévigny; 1,437; 2.3%	David Turcotte; 569; 0.9%	Yan Patry; 320; 0.5%	Mathieu Doyon (Rhino.); 215; 0.4%	René Villemure

==== Eastern Townships ====
Electoral district	Candidates							Incumbent
Electoral district	Liberal	Conservative	BQ	NDP	Green	PPC	Other	Incumbent
Beauce	Maryelle-Henriette Doumbia; 12,057; 19.1%	Jason Groleau; 37,604; 59.7%	Gaétan Mathieu; 8,595; 13.6%	Annabelle Lafond-Poirier; 1,100; 1.7%		**Maxime Bernier**; 3,626; 5.8%		Richard Lehoux^{$}
Brome—Missisquoi	Louis Villeneuve; 34,727; 48.3%	Steve Charbonneau; 13,743; 19.1%	Jeff Boudreault; 20,182; 28.0%	Zoé Larose; 1,600; 2.2%	Michelle Corcos; 1,139; 1.6%	Jack McLeod; 561; 0.8%		Pascale St-Onge^{$}
Compton—Stanstead	Marianne Dandurand; 29,951; 45.6%	Jacques Painchaud; 14,292; 21.8%	Nathalie Bresse; 17,305; 26.4%	Valérie Laliberté; 2,124; 3.2%	Sébastien Tremblay; 1,161; 1.8%	Paul Lehmann; 787; 1.2%		Marie-Claude Bibeau†
Drummond	Ghada Jerbi; 15,998; 28.4%	François Fréchette; 12,790; 22.7%	Martin Champoux; 24,071; 42.8%	François Choquette; 2,607; 4.6%		William Trottier; 773; 1.4%		Martin Champoux
Mégantic—L'Érable—Lotbinière	Charles Mckaig; 12,594; 21.5%	Luc Berthold; 34,470; 58.8%	Réjean Hurteau; 9,607; 16.4%	Gabriel D'Astous; 1,066; 1.8%		Marek Spacek; 717; 1.2%	Yves Gilbert (CHP); 181; 0.3%	Luc Berthold; Mégantic—L'Érable
Richmond—Arthabaska	Alain Saint-Pierre; 20,629; 33.0%	Eric Lefebvre; 22,206; 35.5%	Daniel Lebel; 17,095; 27.3%	Nataël Bureau; 1,248; 2.0%		Philippe D'Arcangeli; 707; 1.1%	Réal Batrhino Martel (Rhino.); 438 0.7%	Alain Rayes†
Richmond—Arthabaska	Alain Saint-Pierre; 20,629; 33.0%	Eric Lefebvre; 22,206; 35.5%	Daniel Lebel; 17,095; 27.3%	Nataël Bureau; 1,248; 2.0%		Philippe D'Arcangeli; 707; 1.1%	Henri Donascimento (Ind.); 223 0.4%	Alain Rayes†
Saint-Hyacinthe—Bagot—Acton	Mélanie Bédard; 19,504; 33.6%	Gaëtan Deschênes; 10,431; 18.0%	Simon-Pierre Savard-Tremblay; 25,447; 43.9%	Raymonde Plamondon; 1,373; 2.4%	Martin Grenier; 800; 1.4%	Sylvain Pariseau; 431; 0.7%		Simon-Pierre Savard-Tremblay; Saint-Hyacinthe—Bagot
Shefford	Felix Dionne; 26,155; 39.3%	James Seale; 11,404; 17.1%	Andréanne Larouche; 26,726; 40.1%	Patrick Jasmin; 1,557; 2.3%		Susanne Lefebvre; 789; 1.2%		Andréanne Larouche
Sherbrooke	Élisabeth Brière; 31,249; 51.3%	Esteban Méndez-Hord; 7,983; 13.1%	Pierre-Étienne Rouillard; 16,224; 26.6%	Jean-Pierre Fortier; 3,516; 5.8%	Kevin McKenna; 1,383; 2.3%	Alexandre Lépine; 576; 0.9%		Élisabeth Brière

==== Montérégie ====
Electoral district	Candidates							Incumbent
Electoral district	Liberal	Conservative	BQ	NDP	Green	PPC	Rhinoceros	Incumbent
Beauharnois—Salaberry—Soulanges—Huntingdon	Miguel Perras; 21,939; 32.1%	Priska St-Pierre; 13,230; 19.4%	Claude Debellefeuille; 30,005; 43.9%	Tyler Jones; 1,663; 2.4%	Kristian Solarik; 802; 1.2%	Martin Lévesque; 675; 1.0%		Claude DeBellefeuille; Salaberry—Suroît
Belœil—Chambly	Nicholas Malouin; 23,136; 34.0%	Sylvain Goulet; 9,199; 13.5%	**Yves-François Blanchet**; 32,844; 48.3%	Marie-Josée Béliveau; 2,391; 3.5%		Nicholas Manes; 482; 0.7%		**Yves-François Blanchet**
Brossard—Saint-Lambert	Alexandra Mendès; 36,541; 62.2%	William Huynh-Jan; 11,076; 18.9%	Soledad Orihuela-Bouchard; 7,837; 13.3%	Zeinab Mistou Akkaoui; 2,049; 3.5%	Gregory De Luca; 855; 1.5%	Hector Huerta; 381; 0.6%		Alexandra Mendès
Châteauguay—Les Jardins-de-Napierville	Nathalie Provost; 28,224; 45.2%	David De Repentigny; 13,538; 21.7%	Patrick O'Hara; 18,160; 29.1%	Hannah Wolker; 1,377; 2.2%	Martine Desrochers; 773; 1.2%	Nicolas Guérin; 429; 0.7%		Brenda Shanahan†; Châteauguay—Lacolle
La Prairie—Atateken	Jacques Ramsay; 29,418; 44.1%	Dave Pouliot; 11,505; 17.2%	Alain Therrien; 23,232; 34.8%	Mathieu Boisvert; 1,588; 2.4%	Barbara Joannette; 657; 1.0%	Ruth Fontaine; 361; 0.5%		Alain Therrien; La Prairie
Longueuil—Charles-LeMoyne	Sherry Romanado; 25,138; 49.4%	Terry Roberts; 8,547; 16.8%	Beritan Oerde; 13,583; 26.7%	Marie-Andrée Gravel; 2,832; 5.6%		Tiny Olinga; 411; 0.8%	Donald Gagnon; 389; 0.8%	Sherry Romanado
Longueuil—Saint-Hubert	Natilien Joseph; 24,237; 41.0%	Martine Boucher; 8,447; 14.3%	Denis Trudel; 23,468; 39.7%	Nesrine Benhadj; 2,986; 5.0%				Denis Trudel
Mont-Saint-Bruno—L'Acadie	Bienvenu-Olivier Ntumba; 32,149; 47.1%	Nicolas Godin; 9,335; 13.7%	Noémie Rouillard; 23,947; 35.1%	Mirabelle Leins; 1,590; 2.3%	Maria Korpijaakko; 833; 1.2%	Patrick Rochon; 397; 0.6%		Stéphane Bergeron†; Montarville
Pierre-Boucher—Les Patriotes—Verchères	Laurent de Casanove; 24,217; 38.8%	Vincent Kunda; 7,375; 11.8%	Xavier Barsalou-Duval; 28,765; 46.1%	Jean-François Filion; 1,541; 2.5%		Alexandre Blais; 528; 0.8%		Xavier Barsalou-Duval
Saint-Jean	Patrick Agbokou; 21,999; 34.3%	Marie Louis-Seize; 10,480; 16.3%	Christine Normandin; 28,474; 44.3%	Danielle Dubuc; 1,650; 2.6%	Vincent Piette; 988; 1.5%	Tchad Deschenes; 624; 1.0%		Christine Normandin
Vaudreuil	Peter Schiefke; 40,982; 57.9%	Thomas Barré; 16,179; 22.8%	Christopher Massé; 10,571; 14.9%	Kalden Dhatsenpa; 1,602; 2.3%	Dave Hamelin-Schuilenburg; 957; 1.4%	Jean Boily; 527; 0.7%		Peter Schiefke; Vaudreuil—Soulanges

==== Northern Montreal and Laval ====
Electoral district	Candidates						Incumbent
Electoral district	Liberal	Conservative	BQ	NDP	PPC	Other	Incumbent
Ahuntsic-Cartierville	Mélanie Joly; 30,833; 61.0%	Margie Ramos; 7,600; 15.0%	Nabila Ben Youssef; 8,538; 16.9%	Idil Issa; 3,333; 6.6%		Linda Sullivan (M-L); 273; 0.5%	Mélanie Joly
Alfred-Pellan	Angelo Iacono; 32,934; 54.6%	Louis Ialenti; 12,671; 21.0%	Isabel Dion; 12,259; 20.3%	Jordan Larochelle; 2,044; 3.4%	Ludovic Mbany; 423; 0.7%		Angelo Iacono
Bourassa	Abdelhaq Sari; 21,198; 58.6%	Néhémie Dumay; 5,905; 16.3%	Jency Mercier; 6,206; 17.1%	Catherine Gauvin; 2,137; 5.9%	Jean-Marc Lamothe; 433; 1.2%	Philippe Tessier (NA); 183 0.5%	Emmanuel Dubourg†
Bourassa	Abdelhaq Sari; 21,198; 58.6%	Néhémie Dumay; 5,905; 16.3%	Jency Mercier; 6,206; 17.1%	Catherine Gauvin; 2,137; 5.9%	Jean-Marc Lamothe; 433; 1.2%	Dominique Théberge (M-L); 140 0.4%	Emmanuel Dubourg†
Laval—Les Îles	Fayçal El-Khoury; 28,302; 49.7%	Konstantinos Merakos; 18,355; 32.2%	Catherine Dansereau-Redhead; 8,298; 14.6%	Étienne Loiselle-Schiettekatte; 1,961; 3.4%			Fayçal El-Khoury
Marc-Aurèle-Fortin	Carlos Leitão; 29,928; 52.0%	Janina Moran; 11,923; 20.7%	Claude Tousignant; 13,584; 23.6%	Alexandrah Cardona-Fortin; 2,128; 3.7%			Yves Robillard†
Papineau	Marjorie Michel; 24,700; 53.0%	Julio Rivera; 4,927; 10.6%	Sophy Forget Bélec; 7,726; 16.6%	Niall Ricardo; 7,606; 16.3%	Noah Cherney; 455; 1.0%	Garnet Colly (M-L); 208 0.4%	Justin Trudeau†
Papineau	Marjorie Michel; 24,700; 53.0%	Julio Rivera; 4,927; 10.6%	Sophy Forget Bélec; 7,726; 16.6%	Niall Ricardo; 7,606; 16.3%	Noah Cherney; 455; 1.0%	Stéphane Doucet (Comm.); 321 0.7%	Justin Trudeau†
Papineau	Marjorie Michel; 24,700; 53.0%	Julio Rivera; 4,927; 10.6%	Sophy Forget Bélec; 7,726; 16.6%	Niall Ricardo; 7,606; 16.3%	Noah Cherney; 455; 1.0%	Xavier Watso (Rhino.); 676 1.5%	Justin Trudeau†
Saint-Léonard—Saint-Michel	Patricia Lattanzio; 26,833; 65.3%	Panagiota Koroneos; 8,457; 20.6%	Laurie Lelacheur; 2,938; 7.2%	Marwan El Attar; 2,450; 6.0%	Caroline Mailloux; 388; 0.9%		Patricia Lattanzio
Vimy	Annie Koutrakis; 26,531; 53.4%	Grace Daou; 12,278; 24.7%	Alicia Parenteau-Malakhanian; 8,526; 17.2%	Cindy Mercer; 2,342; 4.7%			Annie Koutrakis

==== Eastern Montreal ====
Electoral district	Candidates							Incumbent
Electoral district	Liberal	Conservative	BQ	NDP	Green	Marxist-Leninist	Other	Incumbent
Hochelaga—Rosemont-Est	Marie-Gabrielle Ménard; 23,601; 46.1%	Carl Belley; 5,402; 10.6%	Rose Lessard; 13,902; 27.2%	Julie Girard-Lemay; 6,671; 13.0%	Jacob Pirro; 1,329; 2.6%	Christine Dandenault; 242; 0.5%		Soraya Martinez Ferrada^{$} Hochelaga
Honoré-Mercier	Eric St-Pierre; 29,947; 60.2%	Ingrid Fernanda Megni; 10,692; 21.5%	Edline Henri; 6,435; 12.9%	Djaouida Sellah; 1,787; 3.6%	Gaëtan Bérard; 568; 1.1%		Marie-Louise Beauchamp (PPC); 351; 0.7%	Vacant^{$} (Note: There was no byelection because the riding became vacant within nine months of the scheduled date of a general election.)
La Pointe-de-l'Île	Viviane Minko; 20,051; 37.7%	Violetta Potapova; 6,781; 12.7%	Mario Beaulieu; 22,940; 43.1%	Ghada Chaabi; 2,279; 4.3%	Olivier Huard; 977; 1.8%	Geneviève Royer; 181; 0.3%		Mario Beaulieu
Laurier—Sainte-Marie	Steven Guilbeault; 27,286; 52.1%	Mathieu Fournier; 4,796; 9.2%	Emmanuel Lapierre; 8,079; 15.4%	Nimâ Machouf; 9,856; 18.8%	Dylan Perceval-Maxwell; 1,452; 2.8%	Michel Labelle; 269; 0.5%	Eugène Duplessis (PPC); 253 0.5%	Steven Guilbeault
Laurier—Sainte-Marie	Steven Guilbeault; 27,286; 52.1%	Mathieu Fournier; 4,796; 9.2%	Emmanuel Lapierre; 8,079; 15.4%	Nimâ Machouf; 9,856; 18.8%	Dylan Perceval-Maxwell; 1,452; 2.8%	Michel Labelle; 269; 0.5%	Simon-Pierre Lauzon (Ind.); 62 0.1%	Steven Guilbeault
Laurier—Sainte-Marie	Steven Guilbeault; 27,286; 52.1%	Mathieu Fournier; 4,796; 9.2%	Emmanuel Lapierre; 8,079; 15.4%	Nimâ Machouf; 9,856; 18.8%	Dylan Perceval-Maxwell; 1,452; 2.8%	Michel Labelle; 269; 0.5%	Dimitri Mourkes (Ind.); 38 0.1%	Steven Guilbeault
Laurier—Sainte-Marie	Steven Guilbeault; 27,286; 52.1%	Mathieu Fournier; 4,796; 9.2%	Emmanuel Lapierre; 8,079; 15.4%	Nimâ Machouf; 9,856; 18.8%	Dylan Perceval-Maxwell; 1,452; 2.8%	Michel Labelle; 269; 0.5%	Chantal Poulin (Rhino.); 195 0.4%	Steven Guilbeault
Laurier—Sainte-Marie	Steven Guilbeault; 27,286; 52.1%	Mathieu Fournier; 4,796; 9.2%	Emmanuel Lapierre; 8,079; 15.4%	Nimâ Machouf; 9,856; 18.8%	Dylan Perceval-Maxwell; 1,452; 2.8%	Michel Labelle; 269; 0.5%	Adrien Welsh (Comm.); 115 0.2%	Steven Guilbeault
Rosemont—La Petite-Patrie	Jean-Sébastien Vallée; 18,757; 31.6%	Laetitia Tchatat; 4,073; 6.9%	Olivier Gignac; 10,864; 18.3%	Alexandre Boulerice; 24,358; 41.0%	Benoît Morham; 1,368; 2.3%			Alexandre Boulerice

==== Western Montreal ====
Electoral district	Candidates							Incumbent
Electoral district	Liberal	Conservative	BQ	NDP	Green	PPC	Other	Incumbent
Dorval—Lachine—LaSalle	Anju Dhillon; 29,927; 59.4%	Alioune Sarr; 10,428; 20.7%	Pauline Fleur Julie Postel; 6,338; 12.6%	Angélique Soleil Lavoie; 2,104; 4.2%	Amir Badr Eldeen; 823; 1.6%	Michael Patterson; 478; 0.9%	André Lavigne (Rhino.); 251 0.5%	Anju Dhillon
Dorval—Lachine—LaSalle	Anju Dhillon; 29,927; 59.4%	Alioune Sarr; 10,428; 20.7%	Pauline Fleur Julie Postel; 6,338; 12.6%	Angélique Soleil Lavoie; 2,104; 4.2%	Amir Badr Eldeen; 823; 1.6%	Michael Patterson; 478; 0.9%	Katy Le Rougetel (NA); 71 0.1%	Anju Dhillon
Lac-Saint-Louis	Francis Scarpaleggia; 43,446; 67.6%	Matthew Rusniak; 15,203; 23.7%	Tommy Fournier; 2,330; 3.6%	Gregory Evdokias; 1,877; 2.9%	Raymond Frizzell; 915; 1.4%	Mathieu Dufort; 471; 0.7%		Francis Scarpaleggia
LaSalle—Émard—Verdun	Claude Guay; 27,439; 50.9%	Zsolt Fischer; 7,456; 13.8%	Louis-Philippe Sauvé; 11,467; 21.3%	Craig Sauvé; 5,587; 10.4%	Bisma Ansari; 1,298; 2.4%	Gregory Yablunovsky; 260; 0.5%	Normand Chouinard (M-L); 81 0.2%	Louis-Philippe Sauvé
LaSalle—Émard—Verdun	Claude Guay; 27,439; 50.9%	Zsolt Fischer; 7,456; 13.8%	Louis-Philippe Sauvé; 11,467; 21.3%	Craig Sauvé; 5,587; 10.4%	Bisma Ansari; 1,298; 2.4%	Gregory Yablunovsky; 260; 0.5%	Frédéric Dénommé (Rhino.); 169 0.3%	Louis-Philippe Sauvé
LaSalle—Émard—Verdun	Claude Guay; 27,439; 50.9%	Zsolt Fischer; 7,456; 13.8%	Louis-Philippe Sauvé; 11,467; 21.3%	Craig Sauvé; 5,587; 10.4%	Bisma Ansari; 1,298; 2.4%	Gregory Yablunovsky; 260; 0.5%	Fang Hu (Cent.); 60 0.1%	Louis-Philippe Sauvé
LaSalle—Émard—Verdun	Claude Guay; 27,439; 50.9%	Zsolt Fischer; 7,456; 13.8%	Louis-Philippe Sauvé; 11,467; 21.3%	Craig Sauvé; 5,587; 10.4%	Bisma Ansari; 1,298; 2.4%	Gregory Yablunovsky; 260; 0.5%	Manuel Johnson (Comm.); 136 0.3%	Louis-Philippe Sauvé
Mount Royal	Anthony Housefather; 25,544; 51.1%	Neil Oberman; 20,244; 40.5%	Yegor Komarov; 1,671; 3.3%	Adam Frank; 2,353; 4.7%			Diane Johnston (M-L); 216; 0.4%	Anthony Housefather
Notre-Dame-de-Grâce—Westmount	Anna Gainey; 34,226; 64.0%	Neil Drabkin; 10,517; 19.7%	Félix-Antoine Brault; 2,652; 5.0%	Malcolm Lewis-Richmond; 3,956; 7.4%	Arnold Downey; 1,331; 2.5%	Marc Perez; 256; 0.5%	Stephen Hensley (Rhino.); 126 0.2%	Anna Gainey
Notre-Dame-de-Grâce—Westmount	Anna Gainey; 34,226; 64.0%	Neil Drabkin; 10,517; 19.7%	Félix-Antoine Brault; 2,652; 5.0%	Malcolm Lewis-Richmond; 3,956; 7.4%	Arnold Downey; 1,331; 2.5%	Marc Perez; 256; 0.5%	Rachel Hoffman (M-L); 162 0.3%	Anna Gainey
Notre-Dame-de-Grâce—Westmount	Anna Gainey; 34,226; 64.0%	Neil Drabkin; 10,517; 19.7%	Félix-Antoine Brault; 2,652; 5.0%	Malcolm Lewis-Richmond; 3,956; 7.4%	Arnold Downey; 1,331; 2.5%	Marc Perez; 256; 0.5%	Alex Trainman Montagano (Ind.); 264 0.5%	Anna Gainey
Outremont	Rachel Bendayan; 26,024; 55.2%	Ronan Reich; 5,911; 12.5%	Rémi Lebeuf; 5,644; 12.0%	Ève Péclet; 5,024; 10.7%	**Jonathan Pedneault**; 4,539; 9.6%			Rachel Bendayan
Pierrefonds—Dollard	Sameer Zuberi; 34,326; 60.1%	Tanya Toledano; 17,453; 30.5%	Katrina Archambault; 3,097; 5.4%	Kakou Richard Kouassi; 1,613; 2.8%		Gordon Nash; 333; 0.6%	Shahid Khan (Ind.); 266 0.5%	Sameer Zuberi
Pierrefonds—Dollard	Sameer Zuberi; 34,326; 60.1%	Tanya Toledano; 17,453; 30.5%	Katrina Archambault; 3,097; 5.4%	Kakou Richard Kouassi; 1,613; 2.8%		Gordon Nash; 333; 0.6%	Eyad Mobayed (NA); 48 0.1%	Sameer Zuberi
Saint-Laurent	Emmanuella Lambropoulos; 26,021; 58.9%	Richard Serour; 12,477; 28.2%	Marielle Gendron; 2,523; 5.7%	Ryan Byrne; 1,985; 4.5%	Richard Chambers; 693; 1.6%	Manon Chevalier; 349; 0.8%	Fernand Deschamps (M-L); 137; 0.3%	Emmanuella Lambropoulos
Ville-Marie—Le Sud-Ouest—Île-des-Sœurs	Marc Miller; 30,905; 63.7%	Steve Shanahan; 9,113; 18.8%	Kevin Majaducon; 4,364; 9.0%	Suzanne Dufresne; 2,932; 6.0%	Nathe Perrone; 996; 2.1%		Giovanni Di Placido (Rhino.); 209; 0.4%	Marc Miller

==== Laurentides ====
Electoral district	Candidates							Incumbent
Electoral district	Liberal	Conservative	BQ	NDP	Green	PPC	Independent	Incumbent
Laurentides—Labelle	Emrick Vienneau; 18,514; 34.9%	Daniel Paquette; 7,900; 14.9%	Marie-Hélène Gaudreau; 23,615; 44.6%	Michel Noël De Tilly; 1,341; 2.5%	Michel Le Comte; 864; 1.6%	Amélie Charbonneau; 749; 1.4%		Marie-Hélène Gaudreau
Les Pays-d'en-Haut	Tim Watchorn; 26,967; 41.0%	Vincent Leroux; 11,816; 18.0%	Ariane Charbonneau; 23,750; 36.1%	Eric-Abel Baland; 1,493; 2.3%	Karine Steinberger; 1,038; 1.6%	George Mogiljansky; 639; 1.0%		New District
Mirabel	Robert Fleming; 18,796; 33.4%	Serge Dubord; 12,544; 22.3%	Jean-Denis Garon; 22,494; 39.9%	Albert Batten; 1,333; 2.4%	Mario Guay; 792; 1.4%	Christian Montpetit; 400; 0.7%		Jean-Denis Garon^{¢}
Rivière-des-Mille-Îles	Linda Lapointe; 27,326; 45.6%	Elia Lopez; 10,398; 17.4%	Luc Desilets; 19,669; 32.8%	Joseph Hakizimana; 1,270; 2.1%	Alec Ware; 734; 1.2%	David Santamaria Quiceno; 306; 0.5%	Michel Genois; 184; 0.3%	Luc Desilets
Rivière-du-Nord	Mary-Helen Walton; 18,345; 31.6%	Patricia Morrissette; 12,203; 21.0%	Rhéal Fortin; 25,438; 43.8%	Christel Marchand; 2,032; 3.5%				Rhéal Fortin
Terrebonne (judicially certified)	Tatiana Auguste; 23,352; 38.7%	Adrienne Charles; 10,961; 18.2%	Nathalie Sinclair-Desgagné; 23,351; 38.7%	Maxime Beaudoin; 1,556; 2.6%	Benjamin Rankin; 630; 1.0%	Maria Cantore; 428; 0.7%		Nathalie Sinclair Desgagné
Thérèse-De Blainville	Madeleine Chenette; 29,519; 45.8%	Julie Bergeron; 12,019; 18.7%	Marie-Noëlle Closson-Duquette; 20,828; 32.3%	Michel Lacroix; 1,585; 2.5%		Chantal Lavoie; 446; 0.7%		Louise Chabot†

==== Outaouais and Northern Quebec ====
Electoral district	Candidates							Incumbent
Electoral district	Liberal	Conservative	BQ	NDP	Green	PPC	Other	Incumbent
Abitibi—Baie-James—Nunavik—Eeyou	Mandy Gull-Masty; 12,578; 41.2%	Steve Corriveau; 6,850; 22.4%	Sylvie Bérubé; 10,381; 34.0%	Thai Dillon Higashihara; 752; 2.5%				Sylvie Bérubé
Abitibi—Témiscamingue	Jonathan Andresen; 13,551; 27.0%	Steve Tardif; 9,861; 19.7%	Sébastien Lemire; 24,774; 49.4%	Jérémie Juneau; 1,480; 3.0%			Vincent Palin-Bussières (Rhino.); 449; 0.9%	Sébastien Lemire
Argenteuil—La Petite-Nation	Stéphane Lauzon; 28,124; 47.5%	Martin Charron; 14,697; 24.8%	Martin Héroux; 13,520; 22.8%	Michel Welt; 1,499; 2.5%	Bertha Fuchsman-Small; 807; 1.4%	Lindsey Therrien; 586; 1.0%		Stéphane Lauzon
Gatineau	Steven MacKinnon; 34,751; 60.5%	Kethlande Pierre; 10,982; 19.1%	Richard Nadeau; 9,373; 16.3%	Daniel Simoncic; 1,615; 2.8%		Mathieu Saint-Jean; 505; 0.9%	Pierre Soublière (M-L); 173; 0.3%	Steven MacKinnon
Hull—Aylmer	Greg Fergus; 31,978; 62.1%	Jill Declare; 8,727; 16.9%	Alice Grondin; 6,248; 12.1%	Pascale Matecki; 2,855; 5.5%	Frédéric Morin-Paquette; 1,130; 2.2%	Jean-Jacques Desgranges; 341; 0.7%	Alexandre Deschênes (M-L); 208; 0.4%	Greg Fergus
Pontiac—Kitigan Zibi	Sophie Chatel; 32,088; 54.6%	Brian Nolan; 16,221; 27.6%	Suzanne Proulx; 6,071; 10.3%	Gilbert W. Whiteduck; 2,971; 5.1%	Claude Bertrand; 749; 1.3%	Todd Hoffman; 673; 1.1%		Sophie Chatel; Pontiac

=== Ontario ===
==== Ottawa ====
Electoral district	Candidates						Incumbent
Electoral district	Liberal	Conservative	NDP	Green	PPC	Other	Incumbent
Carleton; Details	Bruce Fanjoy; 43,846; 50.9%	**Pierre Poilievre**; 39,333; 45.7%	Beth Prokaska; 1,221; 1.4%	Mark Watson; 561; 0.7%		Karen Bourdeau (UP); 112 0.1%	**Pierre Poilievre**
Carleton; Details	Bruce Fanjoy; 43,846; 50.9%	**Pierre Poilievre**; 39,333; 45.7%	Beth Prokaska; 1,221; 1.4%	Mark Watson; 561; 0.7%		Sébastien CoRhino (Rhino.); 31 0.0%	**Pierre Poilievre**
Carleton; Details	Bruce Fanjoy; 43,846; 50.9%	**Pierre Poilievre**; 39,333; 45.7%	Beth Prokaska; 1,221; 1.4%	Mark Watson; 561; 0.7%		Danny Légaré (Mar.); 37 0.0%	**Pierre Poilievre**
Carleton; Details	Bruce Fanjoy; 43,846; 50.9%	**Pierre Poilievre**; 39,333; 45.7%	Beth Prokaska; 1,221; 1.4%	Mark Watson; 561; 0.7%		Shawn MacEachern (CFP); 63 0.1%	**Pierre Poilievre**
Carleton; Details	Bruce Fanjoy; 43,846; 50.9%	**Pierre Poilievre**; 39,333; 45.7%	Beth Prokaska; 1,221; 1.4%	Mark Watson; 561; 0.7%		LBC at bottom of table	**Pierre Poilievre**
Kanata	Jenna Sudds; 45,244; 60.8%	Greg Kung; 26,557; 35.7%	Melissa Simon; 1,702; 2.3%	Jennifer Purdy; 835; 1.1%		Moinuddin Siddiqui (Cent.); 122; 0.2%	Jenna Sudds; Kanata—Carleton
Nepean	**Mark Carney**; 46,073; 63.8%	Barbara Bal; 24,017; 33.2%	Shyam Shukla; 1,424; 2.0%	Greg Hopkins; 462; 0.6%	Eric Fleury; 261; 0.4%		Chandra Arya^{±}
Orléans	Marie-France Lalonde; 53,146; 67.4%	Steve Mansour; 22,072; 28.0%	Oulai B. Goué; 2,063; 2.6%	Jaycob Jacques; 652; 0.8%	Tafiqul Abu Mohammad; 331; 0.4%	Arlo Arrowsmith (Libert.); 301 0.4%	Marie-France Lalonde
Orléans	Marie-France Lalonde; 53,146; 67.4%	Steve Mansour; 22,072; 28.0%	Oulai B. Goué; 2,063; 2.6%	Jaycob Jacques; 652; 0.8%	Tafiqul Abu Mohammad; 331; 0.4%	Mazhar Choudhry (Ind.); 162 0.2%	Marie-France Lalonde
Orléans	Marie-France Lalonde; 53,146; 67.4%	Steve Mansour; 22,072; 28.0%	Oulai B. Goué; 2,063; 2.6%	Jaycob Jacques; 652; 0.8%	Tafiqul Abu Mohammad; 331; 0.4%	Arabella Vida (Ind.); 76 0.1%	Marie-France Lalonde
Ottawa Centre	Yasir Naqvi; 51,026; 62.7%	Paul D'Orsonnens; 12,692; 15.6%	Joel Harden; 15,935; 19.6%	Amanda Rosenstock; 916; 1.1%		Andrea Chabot (CFP); 268 0.3%	Yasir Naqvi
Ottawa Centre	Yasir Naqvi; 51,026; 62.7%	Paul D'Orsonnens; 12,692; 15.6%	Joel Harden; 15,935; 19.6%	Amanda Rosenstock; 916; 1.1%		Zed Chebib (Ind.); 47 0.1%	Yasir Naqvi
Ottawa Centre	Yasir Naqvi; 51,026; 62.7%	Paul D'Orsonnens; 12,692; 15.6%	Joel Harden; 15,935; 19.6%	Amanda Rosenstock; 916; 1.1%		Marie-Chantal Leriche (CHP); 234 0.3%	Yasir Naqvi
Ottawa Centre	Yasir Naqvi; 51,026; 62.7%	Paul D'Orsonnens; 12,692; 15.6%	Joel Harden; 15,935; 19.6%	Amanda Rosenstock; 916; 1.1%		Cashton Perry (Comm.); 154 0.2%	Yasir Naqvi
Ottawa Centre	Yasir Naqvi; 51,026; 62.7%	Paul D'Orsonnens; 12,692; 15.6%	Joel Harden; 15,935; 19.6%	Amanda Rosenstock; 916; 1.1%		Mike Salmon (Ind.); 66 0.1%	Yasir Naqvi
Ottawa South	David McGuinty; 43,388; 65.2%	Blair Turner; 18,010; 27.1%	Hena Masjedee; 4,017; 6.0%	Nira Dookeran; 642; 1.0%		William Cooper (Rhino.); 155 0.2%	David McGuinty
Ottawa South	David McGuinty; 43,388; 65.2%	Blair Turner; 18,010; 27.1%	Hena Masjedee; 4,017; 6.0%	Nira Dookeran; 642; 1.0%		Alex Perrier (CHP); 259 0.4%	David McGuinty
Ottawa South	David McGuinty; 43,388; 65.2%	Blair Turner; 18,010; 27.1%	Hena Masjedee; 4,017; 6.0%	Nira Dookeran; 642; 1.0%		John Redins (CFP); 93 0.1%	David McGuinty
Ottawa—Vanier—Gloucester	Mona Fortier; 45,934; 67.4%	Dean Wythe; 14,633; 21.5%	Tristan Oliff; 5,164; 7.6%	Christian Proulx; 1,345; 2.0%	Marty Simms; 349; 0.5%	Elizabeth Benoit (Ind.); 238 0.3%	Mona Fortier; Ottawa—Vanier
Ottawa—Vanier—Gloucester	Mona Fortier; 45,934; 67.4%	Dean Wythe; 14,633; 21.5%	Tristan Oliff; 5,164; 7.6%	Christian Proulx; 1,345; 2.0%	Marty Simms; 349; 0.5%	Coreen Corcoran (Libert.); 338 0.5%	Mona Fortier; Ottawa—Vanier
Ottawa—Vanier—Gloucester	Mona Fortier; 45,934; 67.4%	Dean Wythe; 14,633; 21.5%	Tristan Oliff; 5,164; 7.6%	Christian Proulx; 1,345; 2.0%	Marty Simms; 349; 0.5%	Christian Legeais (M-L); 182 0.3%	Mona Fortier; Ottawa—Vanier
Ottawa West—Nepean	Anita Vandenbeld; 43,555; 63.6%	Ryan Telford; 18,517; 27.1%	Josh Bizjak; 4,847; 7.1%	Prashanta Dhakal; 780; 1.1%	Glen Armstrong; 514; 0.8%	Sean Mulligan (CHP); 232; 0.3%	Anita Vandenbeld

Longest Ballot Committee (Note: Longest Ballot Committee candidates have Tomas Szuchewycz as their official agent. Affiliated candidates from registered political parties are listed normally.) All independent unless noted: Sana Ahmad 41; Mélodie Anderson 16; Marthalee Aykroyd 9; Alex Banks 16; Tetia Bayoro 5; Sophie Bearden 14; Michael Bednarski 15; Line Bélanger 6; Jeani Boudreault (NA) 12; Alain Bourgault 8; John Boylan 17; Sarah Burke 27; Dante Camarena Jimenez 4; Jenny Cartwright 11; Jaël Champagne Gareau 4; David Cherniak 5; Charlie Currie 20; John Dale 20; Manon Marie Lili Desbiens (NA) 3; Gerrit Dogger 4; Ysack Dupont (NA) 0; Alexandra Engering 12; Scott Falkingham 45; Euan Fraser Tait 18; Maria Gabriel 10; Daniel Gagnon 8; Pierre Gauthier 38; Gregory Gillis 4; Jeffrey Goodman 11; Peter Gorman 7; Daniel Graham 2; Artem Gudkov 3; Zornitsa Halacheva 2; Anthony Hamel 2; Blake Hamilton 6; Robert Harris 8; Loren Hicks 6; Kerri Hildebrandt (NA) 3; Andrea Hollinger 8; Trevor Holsworth 3; Seyed Hosseini Lavasani 13; Ryan Huard 9; Demetrios Karavas 2; Laina Kohler (NA) 10; Kevin Krisa 5; Krzysztof Krzywinski (NA) 3; Dan Kyung 35; Samuel Lafontaine 3; Alain Lamontagne 5; Alexander Lein (NA) 6; Charles Lemieux 10; Connie Lukawski 8; Agnieszka Marszalek 6; Joseph Maw 1; Donald McKay 11; Mark Moutter 23; Christopher Navarro-Canseco (NA) 4; Winston Neutel 5; David Nguyen 15; Sheri Oberman 2; John Francis O'Flynn 8; Lény Painchaud 5; Lanna Palsson 4; Guillaume Paradis 37; Lajos Polya 12; Lorant Polya 57; Spencer Rocchi 4; Wallace Richard Rowat 2; Julian Selody 7; Hakim Sheriff 6; Roger Sherwood 3; Yogo Shimada 3; Michael Skirzynski 3; Julie St-Amand 3; Pascal St-Amand 2; Patrick Strzalkowski 4; Daniel Stuckless 11; Benjamin Teichman 2; Sarah Thompson 9; Darcy Vanderwater (NA) 12; Elliot Wand 5; Michal Wieczorek 7; David Zhu 21

==== Eastern Ontario ====
Electoral district	Candidates					Incumbent
Electoral district	Liberal	Conservative	NDP	Green	Other	Incumbent
Algonquin—Renfrew—Pembroke	Cyndi Mills; 25,338; 37.8%	Cheryl Gallant; 37,333; 55.7%	Eileen Jones-Whyte; 2,469; 3.7%	Danilo Velasquez; 618; 0.9%	Randy Briand (UP); 909 1.4%	Cheryl Gallant; Renfrew—Nipissing—Pembroke
Algonquin—Renfrew—Pembroke	Cyndi Mills; 25,338; 37.8%	Cheryl Gallant; 37,333; 55.7%	Eileen Jones-Whyte; 2,469; 3.7%	Danilo Velasquez; 618; 0.9%	Stefan Klietsch (Ind.); 122 0.2%	Cheryl Gallant; Renfrew—Nipissing—Pembroke
Algonquin—Renfrew—Pembroke	Cyndi Mills; 25,338; 37.8%	Cheryl Gallant; 37,333; 55.7%	Eileen Jones-Whyte; 2,469; 3.7%	Danilo Velasquez; 618; 0.9%	Seth Malina (Ind.); 229 0.3%	Cheryl Gallant; Renfrew—Nipissing—Pembroke
Bay of Quinte	Chris Malette; 32,846; 50.4%	Ryan Williams; 29,130; 44.7%	Kate Crothers; 2,373; 3.6%	Erica Charlton; 833; 1.3%		Ryan Williams
Hastings—Lennox and Addington—Tyendinaga	Tracey Sweeney Schenk; 26,745; 40.4%	Shelby Kramp-Neuman; 36,005; 54.3%	Ava Duffy; 2,351; 3.5%	Michael Holbrook; 803; 1.2%	Zaid Yusufani (PPC); 377; 0.6%	Shelby Kramp-Neuman; Hastings—Lennox and Addington
Kingston and the Islands	Mark Gerretsen; 48,682; 63.2%	Bryan Paterson; 23,592; 30.6%	Daria Juüdi-Hope; 3,648; 4.7%	Fintan Hartnett; 1,071; 1.4%		Mark Gerretsen
Lanark—Frontenac	Michelle Foxton; 30,900; 45.6%	Scott Reid; 34,186; 50.4%	Danielle Rae; 1,986; 2.9%	Jesse Pauley; 741; 1.1%		Scott Reid; Lanark—Frontenac—Kingston
Leeds—Grenville—Thousand Islands—Rideau Lakes	Lorna Jean Edmonds; 29,656; 44.4%	Michael Barrett; 33,437; 50.0%	Paul Lancione; 2,341; 3.5%	Randi Ramdeen; 781; 1.2%	Hailey Simpson (PPC); 596; 0.9%	Michael Barrett; Leeds—Grenville—Thousand Islands and Rideau Lakes
Prescott—Russell—Cumberland	Giovanna Mingarelli; 39,110; 54.8%	Julie Séguin; 28,805; 40.3%	Ryder Finlay; 1,730; 2.4%	Thaila Riden; 787; 1.1%	Deborah Perrier (PPC); 725 1.0%	Francis Drouin†; Glengarry—Prescott—Russell
Prescott—Russell—Cumberland	Giovanna Mingarelli; 39,110; 54.8%	Julie Séguin; 28,805; 40.3%	Ryder Finlay; 1,730; 2.4%	Thaila Riden; 787; 1.1%	Jason St-Louis (Ind.); 236 0.3%	Francis Drouin†; Glengarry—Prescott—Russell
Stormont—Dundas—Glengarry	Sarah Good; 26,407; 39.8%	Eric Duncan; 37,399; 56.3%	Mario Leclerc; 1,653; 2.5%	Gordon Kubanek; 674; 1.0%	Karl Ivan MacKinnon (Libert.); 274; 0.4%	Eric Duncan; Stormont—Dundas—South Glengarry

==== Central Ontario ====
Electoral district	Candidates						Incumbent
Electoral district	Liberal	Conservative	NDP	Green	PPC	Other	Incumbent
Barrie South—Innisfil	John Olthuis; 25,557; 38.0%	John Brassard; 38,943; 57.8%	Andrew Harrigan; 2,130; 3.2%		Mark Sampson; 695; 1.0%		John Brassard; Barrie—Innisfil
Barrie—Springwater—Oro-Medonte	Rose Zacharias; 29,150; 44.4%	Doug Shipley; 33,949; 51.7%	Gabriela Trujillo; 1,559; 2.4%	Greg Taylor; 893; 1.4%		Michael Speers (Comm.); 158; 0.2%	Doug Shipley
Bruce—Grey—Owen Sound	Anne Marie Watson; 26,837; 40.1%	Alex Ruff; 35,484; 53.0%	Christopher Neudorf; 2,069; 3.1%	Natasha Akiwenzie; 1,447; 2.2%	Pavel Smolko; 520; 0.8%	Ann Gillies (UP); 554; 0.8%	Alex Ruff
Dufferin—Caledon	Malalai Halimi; 24,818; 35.2%	Kyle Seeback; 42,458; 60.1%	Viktor Karklins; 1,380; 2.0%	Ifra Baig; 927; 1.3%	Dympna Carolan; 752; 1.1%	Jeffrey Halsall (Ind.); 260; 0.4%	Kyle Seeback
Haliburton—Kawartha Lakes	Nell Thomas; 29,223; 38.7%	Jamie Schmale; 42,701; 56.6%	Alyea Teel; 2,625; 3.5%		Michael Penman; 954; 1.3%		Jamie Schmale; Haliburton—Kawartha Lakes—Brock
New Tecumseth—Gwillimbury	Mike Hanrahan; 24,444; 37.0%	Scot Davidson; 39,247; 59.4%	Nancy Morrison; 1,226; 1.9%	Callum McKinnon; 712; 1.1%	Paul Montague; 496; 0.8%		Scot Davidson; York—Simcoe
Northumberland—Clarke	John Goheen; 32,648; 45.9%	Philip Lawrence; 34,862; 49.0%	Ava Becker; 2,090; 2.9%	Christina Marie Wilson; 630; 0.9%	Lisa Bradburn; 521; 0.7%	Jody Ledgerwood (Ind.); 270 0.4%	Philip Lawrence; Northumberland—Peterborough South
Northumberland—Clarke	John Goheen; 32,648; 45.9%	Philip Lawrence; 34,862; 49.0%	Ava Becker; 2,090; 2.9%	Christina Marie Wilson; 630; 0.9%	Lisa Bradburn; 521; 0.7%	John Wesselius (CHP); 171 0.2%	Philip Lawrence; Northumberland—Peterborough South
Peterborough	Emma Harrison; 42,890; 54.3%	Michelle Ferreri; 32,446; 41.0%	Heather Ray; 2,406; 3.0%	Jazmine Raine; 655; 0.8%	Jami-Leigh McMaster; 272; 0.3%	Matthew Grove (CHP); 168 0.2%	Michelle Ferreri; Peterborough—Kawartha
Peterborough	Emma Harrison; 42,890; 54.3%	Michelle Ferreri; 32,446; 41.0%	Heather Ray; 2,406; 3.0%	Jazmine Raine; 655; 0.8%	Jami-Leigh McMaster; 272; 0.3%	Chad Jewell (Ind.); 222 0.3%	Michelle Ferreri; Peterborough—Kawartha
Simcoe—Grey	Bren Munro; 29,455; 43.4%	Terry Dowdall; 35,364; 52.1%	Jasleen Bains; 1,574; 2.3%	Allan Kuhn; 991; 1.5%	Giorgio Mammoliti; 523; 0.8%		Terry Dowdall
Simcoe North	Ryan Rocca; 29,767; 44.7%	Adam Chambers; 32,241; 48.4%	Melissa Lloyd; 2,508; 3.8%	Ray Little; 1,260; 1.9%	Stephen Toivo Makk; 638; 1.0%	Russ Emo (CHP); 191; 0.3%	Adam Chambers

==== Southern Durham ====
Electoral district	Candidates						Incumbent
Electoral district	Liberal	Conservative	NDP	Green	Centrist	Other	Incumbent
Ajax	Jennifer McKelvie; 36,975; 56.3%	Greg Brady; 25,658; 39.1%	Kyle Forster; 1,762; 2.7%	Leigh Paulseth; 612; 0.9%	Faisal Ali; 643; 1.0%		Mark Holland^{$}
Bowmanville—Oshawa North	Bridget Girard; 32,214; 45.5%	Jamil Jivani; 35,232; 49.8%	Elenor Marano; 2,032; 2.9%	Julie Dietrich; 546; 0.8%	Ghuzna Imam; 134; 0.2%	Clint Cole (UP); 143 0.2%	Jamil Jivani; Durham
Bowmanville—Oshawa North	Bridget Girard; 32,214; 45.5%	Jamil Jivani; 35,232; 49.8%	Elenor Marano; 2,032; 2.9%	Julie Dietrich; 546; 0.8%	Ghuzna Imam; 134; 0.2%	Pranay Gunti (Ind.); 264 0.4%	Jamil Jivani; Durham
Bowmanville—Oshawa North	Bridget Girard; 32,214; 45.5%	Jamil Jivani; 35,232; 49.8%	Elenor Marano; 2,032; 2.9%	Julie Dietrich; 546; 0.8%	Ghuzna Imam; 134; 0.2%	Adam Smith (Rhino.); 68 0.1%	Jamil Jivani; Durham
Bowmanville—Oshawa North	Bridget Girard; 32,214; 45.5%	Jamil Jivani; 35,232; 49.8%	Elenor Marano; 2,032; 2.9%	Julie Dietrich; 546; 0.8%	Ghuzna Imam; 134; 0.2%	Thomas Zekveld (CHP); 155 0.2%	Jamil Jivani; Durham
Oshawa	Isaac Ransom; 28,653; 43.0%	Rhonda Kirkland; 32,131; 48.2%	Sara Labelle; 5,112; 7.7%	Katherine Mathewson; 804; 1.2%			Colin Carrie†
Pickering—Brooklin	Juanita Nathan; 38,578; 54.2%	Alicia Vianga; 29,320; 41.2%	Jamie Nye; 1,838; 2.6%	Andrea Wood; 535; 0.8%	Zainab Rana; 322; 0.5%	Lisa Robinson (PPC); 639; 0.9%	Jennifer O'Connell^{$} Pickering—Uxbridge
Whitby	Ryan Turnbull; 35,624; 52.7%	Steve Yamada; 29,620; 43.8%	Kevin Goswell; 1,638; 2.4%	Andrew Di Lullo; 506; 0.7%	Nouman Mian; 206; 0.3%		Ryan Turnbull

==== York Region ====
Electoral district	Candidates						Incumbent
Electoral district	Liberal	Conservative	NDP	Green	PPC	Other	Incumbent
Aurora—Oak Ridges—Richmond Hill	Leah Taylor Roy; 26,590; 42.8%	Costas Menegakis; 34,023; 54.7%	Danielle Maniuk; 835; 1.3%	Tom Muench; 465; 0.7%	Igor Tvorogov; 256; 0.4%		Leah Taylor Roy
King—Vaughan	Mubarak Ahmed; 24,352; 35.9%	Anna Roberts; 41,682; 61.5%	Samantha Sanchez; 769; 1.1%	Ann Raney; 576; 0.9%	Vageesh Sabharwal; 368; 0.5%		Anna Roberts
Markham—Stouffville	Helena Jaczek; 31,658; 51.4%	Niran Jeyanesan; 27,898; 45.3%	Serena Cheung; 1,121; 1.8%	Myles O'Brien; 433; 0.7%	René de Vries; 393; 0.6%	Shahzad Ahmed (Cent.); 141; 0.2%	Helena Jaczek^{¢}
Markham—Thornhill	Tim Hodgson; 27,504; 54.5%	Lionel Loganathan; 21,003; 41.6%	Aftab Qureshi; 1,022; 2.0%		Mimi Lee; 747; 1.5%	Haider Qureshi (Cent.); 153; 0.3%	Mary Ng^{$}
Markham—Unionville	Peter Yuen; 25,133; 47.1%	Michael Ma; 27,055; 50.7%	Sameer Qureshi; 723; 1.4%	Elvin Kao; 503; 0.9%			Paul Chiang^{$}
Newmarket—Aurora	Jennifer McLachlan; 29,299; 47.0%	Sandra Cobena; 31,540; 50.6%	Anna Gollen; 1,473; 2.4%				Tony Van Bynen†
Richmond Hill South	Majid Jowhari; 26,009; 44.4%	Vincent Ho; 30,615; 52.3%	Ebrahim Astaraki; 1,054; 1.8%	Alison Lam; 495; 0.8%	Joshua Sideris; 244; 0.4%	Yan Wang (Ind.); 124 0.2%	Majid Jowhari; Richmond Hill
Richmond Hill South	Majid Jowhari; 26,009; 44.4%	Vincent Ho; 30,615; 52.3%	Ebrahim Astaraki; 1,054; 1.8%	Alison Lam; 495; 0.8%	Joshua Sideris; 244; 0.4%	Juni Yeung (CFP); 43 0.1%	Majid Jowhari; Richmond Hill
Thornhill	Liane Kotler; 20,873; 31.2%	Melissa Lantsman; 44,419; 66.4%	William McCarty; 833; 1.2%	Dominic Piotrowski; 353; 0.5%	Amir Hart; 440; 0.7%		Melissa Lantsman
Vaughan—Woodbridge	Francesco Sorbara; 25,617; 38.0%	Michael Guglielmin; 40,422; 60.0%	Ali Bahman; 891; 1.3%		Roman Yevseyev; 425; 0.6%		Francesco Sorbara
York—Durham	Robert Grossi; 28,726; 39.6%	Jacob Mantle; 40,329; 55.6%	Justin Graham; 1,829; 2.5%	Matt Pearce; 797; 1.1%	Patricia Conlin; 901; 1.2%		New District

==== Scarborough ====
Electoral district	Candidates					Incumbent
Electoral district	Liberal	Conservative	NDP	Green	Other	Incumbent
Scarborough—Agincourt	Jean Yip; 27,552; 54.3%	Aris Movsessian; 21,732; 42.8%	Dan Lovell; 1,449; 2.9%			Jean Yip
Scarborough Centre—Don Valley East	Salma Zahid; 27,557; 57.3%	Belent Mathew; 18,307; 38.1%	Alyson Koa; 1,565; 3.3%		Peter Koubakis (PPC); 659; 1.4%	Michael Coteau‡ Don Valley East {(Running in Scarborough—Woburn)
Scarborough Centre—Don Valley East	Salma Zahid; 27,557; 57.3%	Belent Mathew; 18,307; 38.1%	Alyson Koa; 1,565; 3.3%		Peter Koubakis (PPC); 659; 1.4%	Merged District
Scarborough Centre—Don Valley East	Salma Zahid; 27,557; 57.3%	Belent Mathew; 18,307; 38.1%	Alyson Koa; 1,565; 3.3%		Peter Koubakis (PPC); 659; 1.4%	Salma Zahid; Scarborough Centre
Scarborough—Guildwood—Rouge Park	Gary Anandasangaree; 35,295; 64.0%	Suchita Jalan; 17,485; 31.7%	Kingsley Kwok; 1,772; 3.2%	Troy Rife; 633; 1.1%		Gary Anandasangaree; Scarborough—Rouge Park
Scarborough North	Shaun Chen; 29,418; 63.0%	Gurmit Sandhu; 15,487; 33.1%	Karishma Manji; 1,827; 3.9%			Shaun Chen
Scarborough Southwest	Bill Blair; 33,495; 61.5%	Asm Tarun; 16,652; 30.6%	Fatima Shaban; 2,730; 5.0%	Amanda Cain; 754; 1.4%	Imran Khan (Cent.); 165 0.3%	Bill Blair
Scarborough Southwest	Bill Blair; 33,495; 61.5%	Asm Tarun; 16,652; 30.6%	Fatima Shaban; 2,730; 5.0%	Amanda Cain; 754; 1.4%	Christine Nugent (M-L); 113 0.2%	Bill Blair
Scarborough Southwest	Bill Blair; 33,495; 61.5%	Asm Tarun; 16,652; 30.6%	Fatima Shaban; 2,730; 5.0%	Amanda Cain; 754; 1.4%	Michael Poulin (PPC); 567 1.0%	Bill Blair
Scarborough—Woburn	Michael Coteau; 25,281; 60.4%	Reddy Muttukuru; 14,291; 34.1%	George Wedge; 1,466; 3.5%	Gianne Broughton; 499; 1.2%	Amina Bhaiyat (Ind.); 181 0.4%	John McKay†; Scarborough—Guildwood
Scarborough—Woburn	Michael Coteau; 25,281; 60.4%	Reddy Muttukuru; 14,291; 34.1%	George Wedge; 1,466; 3.5%	Gianne Broughton; 499; 1.2%	Ayub Sipra (Cent.); 150 0.4%	John McKay†; Scarborough—Guildwood

==== North York ====
Electoral district	Candidates					Incumbent
Electoral district	Liberal	Conservative	NDP	Green	Other	Incumbent
Don Valley North	Maggie Chi; 25,822; 53.2%	Joe Tay; 20,546; 42.3%	Naila Saeed; 1,191; 2.5%	Andrew Armstrong; 448; 0.9%	Xiaohua Gong (NA); 260 0.5%	Han Dong†
Don Valley North	Maggie Chi; 25,822; 53.2%	Joe Tay; 20,546; 42.3%	Naila Saeed; 1,191; 2.5%	Andrew Armstrong; 448; 0.9%	Ivan Milivojevic (PPC); 260 0.5%	Han Dong†
Don Valley West	Rob Oliphant; 36,744; 62.6%	Robert Pierce; 19,480; 33.2%	Linnea Löfström-Abary; 1,382; 2.4%	Sheena Sharp; 616; 1.1%	Bahira Abdulsalam (Ind.); 442; 0.8%	Rob Oliphant
Eglinton—Lawrence	Vince Gasparro; 29,949; 49.3%	Karen Stintz; 29,061; 47.8%	Allison Tanzola; 996; 1.6%	Wayne Chechuevskiy; 429; 0.7%	Timothy Gleeson (PPC); 326; 0.5%	Vacant
Willowdale	Ali Ehsassi; 25,488; 53.4%	James Lin; 20,977; 44.0%	Christy Kheirallah; 1,224; 2.6%			Ali Ehsassi
York Centre	Ya'ara Saks; 20,318; 42.7%	Roman Baber; 26,110; 54.8%	Yusuf Ulukanligil; 1,191; 2.5%			Ya'ara Saks

==== Central Toronto and East York ====
Electoral district	Candidates							Incumbent
Electoral district	Liberal	Conservative	NDP	Green	Marxist-Leninist	Communist	Other	Incumbent
Beaches—East York	Nate Erskine-Smith; 39,804; 67.7%	Jocelyne Poirier; 13,830; 23.5%	Shannon Devine; 4,027; 6.9%	Jack Pennings; 748; 1.3%	Steve Rutchinski; 39; 0.1%	**Elizabeth Rowley**; 146; 0.2%	Diane Joseph (Ind.); 161; 0.3%	Nathaniel Erskine-Smith^{¢}
Davenport	Julie Dzerowicz; 35,364; 57.8%	Francis Lavoie; 14,189; 23.2%	Sandra Sousa; 10,452; 17.1%	Lilian Barrera; 782; 1.3%		Dave McKee; 387; 0.6%		Julie Dzerowicz
Spadina—Harbourfront	Chi Nguyen; 31,832; 60.1%	Diana Filipova; 16,286; 30.7%	Norm Di Pasquale; 4,107; 7.8%	Gordon Rand; 448; 0.8%	Nick Lin; 85; 0.2%		Gilbert Joseph Jubinville (PPC); 193 0.4%	Kevin Vuong†; Spadina—Fort York
Spadina—Harbourfront	Chi Nguyen; 31,832; 60.1%	Diana Filipova; 16,286; 30.7%	Norm Di Pasquale; 4,107; 7.8%	Gordon Rand; 448; 0.8%	Nick Lin; 85; 0.2%		Shrey Rao (Ind.); 39 0.1%	Kevin Vuong†; Spadina—Fort York
Taiaiako'n—Parkdale—High Park	Karim Bardeesy; 36,439; 55.8%	Wladyslaw Lizon; 12,662; 19.4%	Bhutila Karpoche; 15,003; 23.0%	Anna Gorka; 700; 1.1%	Lorne Gershuny; 92; 0.1%	Rimmy Riarh; 137; 0.2%	Edward Fraser (APP); 184 0.3%	Arif Virani^{$} Parkdale—High Park
Taiaiako'n—Parkdale—High Park	Karim Bardeesy; 36,439; 55.8%	Wladyslaw Lizon; 12,662; 19.4%	Bhutila Karpoche; 15,003; 23.0%	Anna Gorka; 700; 1.1%	Lorne Gershuny; 92; 0.1%	Rimmy Riarh; 137; 0.2%	Terry Parker (Mar.); 96 0.1%	Arif Virani^{$} Parkdale—High Park
Toronto Centre	Evan Solomon; 37,907; 64.3%	Luis Ibarra; 12,321; 20.9%	Samantha Green; 7,358; 12.5%	Olivia Iheme; 664; 1.1%	Philip Fernandez; 170; 0.3%		Simon Luisi (APP); 177 0.3%	Marci Ien^{$}
Toronto Centre	Evan Solomon; 37,907; 64.3%	Luis Ibarra; 12,321; 20.9%	Samantha Green; 7,358; 12.5%	Olivia Iheme; 664; 1.1%	Philip Fernandez; 170; 0.3%		Cleveland Marshall (Ind.); 90 0.2%	Marci Ien^{$}
Toronto Centre	Evan Solomon; 37,907; 64.3%	Luis Ibarra; 12,321; 20.9%	Samantha Green; 7,358; 12.5%	Olivia Iheme; 664; 1.1%	Philip Fernandez; 170; 0.3%		Nathen Mazri (PPC); 235 0.4%	Marci Ien^{$}
Toronto—Danforth	Julie Dabrusin; 39,191; 66.6%	Ashik Hussain; 11,187; 19.0%	Clare Hacksel; 7,626; 13.0%	Silvia Stardust; 626; 1.1%			**Liz White** (APP); 251; 0.4%	Julie Dabrusin
Toronto—St. Paul's	Leslie Church; 44,313; 61.9%	Don Stewart; 23,700; 33.1%	Bruce Levy; 2,496; 3.5%	Shane Philips; 552; 0.8%	David Gershuny; 133; 0.2%		Joseph Frasca (PPC); 329 0.5%	Don Stewart
Toronto—St. Paul's	Leslie Church; 44,313; 61.9%	Don Stewart; 23,700; 33.1%	Bruce Levy; 2,496; 3.5%	Shane Philips; 552; 0.8%	David Gershuny; 133; 0.2%		Cynthia Valdron (CFP); 58 0.1%	Don Stewart
University—Rosedale	Chrystia Freeland; 39,847; 64.0%	Liz Grade; 14,624; 23.5%	Serena Purdy; 6,168; 9.9%	Ignacio Mongrell; 1,066; 1.7%	Barbara Biley; 138; 0.2%	Drew Garvie; 304; 0.5%	Adam Golding (Ind.); 118; 0.2%	Chrystia Freeland

==== Etobicoke and York ====
Electoral district	Candidates						Incumbent
Electoral district	Liberal	Conservative	NDP	Green	PPC	Other	Incumbent
Etobicoke Centre	Yvan Baker; 36,186; 53.6%	Ted Opitz; 29,713; 44.0%	Ji Won Jung; 1,611; 2.4%				Yvan Baker
Etobicoke—Lakeshore	James Maloney; 37,512; 57.4%	Bernard Trottier; 25,348; 38.8%	Cory Wagar; 1,665; 2.5%		Thomas Fanjoy; 616; 0.9%	Janice Murray (M-L); 197; 0.3%	James Maloney
Etobicoke North	John Zerucelli; 22,270; 52.6%	Natalie Weed; 17,359; 41.0%	Benjamin Abis; 1,354; 3.2%	Sarun Balaranjan; 394; 0.9%	Andy D'Andrea; 846; 2.0%	Neil Simon (Ind.); 132; 0.3%	Kirsty Duncan^{$}
Humber River—Black Creek	Judy Sgro; 21,357; 55.6%	Bijay Paudel; 13,745; 35.8%	Matias de Dovitiis; 2,449; 6.4%		Marek Jasinski; 621; 1.6%	Jeanne McGuire (Comm.); 226; 0.6%	Judy Sgro
York South—Weston—Etobicoke	Ahmed Hussen; 24,663; 55.3%	Nicolas Pham; 17,746; 39.8%	Louise James; 2,190; 4.9%				Ahmed Hussen; York South—Weston

==== Brampton ====
Electoral district	Candidates							Incumbent
Electoral district	Liberal	Conservative	NDP	Green	PPC	Centrist	Independent	Incumbent
Brampton Centre	Amandeep Sodhi; 19,716; 48.4%	Taran Chahal; 19,105; 46.9%	Anil Boodhai; 1,085; 2.7%	Ray Shaver; 469; 1.2%	Harsimran Kaur Hundal; 288; 0.7%	Taha Nazir; 97; 0.2%		Shafqat Ali‡ (Running in Brampton—Chinguacousy Park)
Brampton—Chinguacousy Park	Shafqat Ali; 21,532; 48.8%	Tim Iqbal; 19,591; 44.4%	Teresa Yeh; 1,173; 2.7%	Mike Dancy; 521; 1.2%	Jayesh Brahmbhatt; 741; 1.7%	Hafiz Muneeb Ahmad; 194; 0.4%	Avi Dhaliwal; 328; 0.7%	New District
Brampton East	Maninder Sidhu; 23,616; 48.6%	Bob Dosanjh Singh; 21,731; 44.7%	Haramrit Singh; 821; 1.7%		Jeff Lal; 2,305; 4.7%	Abdus S Kissana; 132; 0.3%		Maninder Sidhu
Brampton North—Caledon	Ruby Sahota; 22,847; 49.0%	Amandeep Judge; 22,105; 47.4%	Ruby Zaman; 1,008; 2.2%		Sat Anand; 635; 1.4%			Ruby Sahota; Brampton North
Brampton South	Sonia Sidhu; 22,001; 49.3%	Sukhdeep Kang; 21,193; 47.5%	Rajni Sharma; 777; 1.7%		Vijay Kumar; 358; 0.8%		Manmohan Khroud; 274; 0.6%	Sonia Sidhu
Brampton West	Kamal Khera; 20,194; 47.6%	Amarjeet Gill; 21,112; 49.8%	Zaigham Javed; 708; 1.7%	Sameera Khan; 278; 0.7%		Khawaja Amir Hassan; 95; 0.2%		Kamal Khera

==== Mississauga ====
Electoral district	Candidates							Incumbent
Electoral district	Liberal	Conservative	NDP	Green	PPC	Independent	Marxist-Leninist	Incumbent
Mississauga Centre	Fares Al Soud; 29,605; 53.9%	Muhammad Ishaq; 23,010; 41.9%	Brandon Nguyen; 1,502; 2.7%		Gurdeep Wolosz; 602; 1.1%	Zulfiqar Ali; 257; 0.5%		Omar Alghabra†
Mississauga East—Cooksville	Peter Fonseca; 27,138; 50.2%	Nita Kang; 24,112; 44.6%	Khawar Hussain; 1,508; 2.8%		Amit Gupta; 964; 1.8%	Winston Harding; 221; 0.4%	Dagmar Sullivan; 113; 0.2%	Peter Fonseca
Mississauga—Erin Mills	Iqra Khalid; 33,448; 55.7%	Milad Mikael; 24,000; 40.0%	Ehab Mustapha; 1,311; 2.2%	Sulaiman Khan; 367; 0.6%	Michael Bayer; 734; 1.2%	Michael Matulewicz; 179; 0.3%		Iqra Khalid
Mississauga—Lakeshore	Charles Sousa; 34,971; 52.4%	Tom Ellard; 29,416; 44.0%	Evelyn Butler; 1,254; 1.9%	Mary Kidnew; 587; 0.9%	Fahad Rao; 334; 0.5%	Carlton Darby; 122; 0.2%	**Anna Di Carlo**; 113; 0.2%	Charles Sousa
Mississauga—Malton	Iqwinder Singh Gaheer; 26,793; 53.3%	Jaspreet Sandhu; 21,202; 42.2%	Inderjeetsingh Ailsinghani; 1,290; 2.6%		Nathan Quinlan; 983; 2.0%			Iqwinder Gaheer
Mississauga—Streetsville	Rechie Valdez; 31,297; 51.5%	Sue McFadden; 27,241; 44.9%	Bushra Asghar; 1,388; 2.3%	Chris Hill; 439; 0.7%	Logan Araujo; 366; 0.6%			Rechie Valdez

==== Halton ====
Electoral district	Candidates						Incumbent
Electoral district	Liberal	Conservative	NDP	Green	PPC	Other	Incumbent
Burlington	Karina Gould; 43,593; 55.8%	Emily Brown; 31,686; 40.6%	Michael Beauchemin; 1,549; 2.0%	Kyle Hutton; 595; 0.8%	Michael Bator; 523; 0.7%	Paul Harper (Rhino.); 75 0.1%	Karina Gould
Burlington	Karina Gould; 43,593; 55.8%	Emily Brown; 31,686; 40.6%	Michael Beauchemin; 1,549; 2.0%	Kyle Hutton; 595; 0.8%	Michael Bator; 523; 0.7%	Ocean Marshall (Libert.); 105 0.1%	Karina Gould
Burlington North—Milton West	Adam Van Koeverden; 37,155; 52.7%	Nadeem Akbar; 31,172; 44.3%	Naveed Ahmed; 1,507; 2.1%		Charles Zach; 607; 0.9%		Adam van Koeverden; Milton
Milton East—Halton Hills South (judicially certified)	Kristina Tesser Derksen; 32,178; 48.3%	Parm Gill; 32,157; 48.2%	Muhammad Riaz Sahi; 1,029; 1.5%	Susan Doyle; 672; 1.0%	Walter J. Hofman; 475; 0.7%	Shahbaz Mahmood Khan (Ind.); 174; 0.3%	New District
Oakville East	Anita Anand; 31,128; 51.1%	Ron Chhinzer; 27,301; 44.8%	Hailey Ford; 1,698; 2.8%	Bruno Sousa; 351; 0.6%	Henry Karabela; 335; 0.6%	Alicia Bedford (UP); 59; 0.1%	Anita Anand^{¢} Oakville
Oakville West	Sima Acan; 31,872; 53.1%	Tim Crowder; 26,668; 44.4%	Diane Downey; 831; 1.4%	Chris Kowalchuk; 363; 0.6%	JD Meaney; 254; 0.4%	Martin Gegus (Ind.); 55; 0.1%	Pam Damoff†; Oakville North—Burlington

==== Hamilton and Niagara ====
Electoral district	Candidates						Incumbent
Electoral district	Liberal	Conservative	NDP	Green	PPC	Other	Incumbent
Flamborough—Glanbrook—Brant North	Chuck Phillips; 28,915; 43.2%	Dan Muys; 35,246; 52.7%	Peter Werhun; 1,630; 2.4%	Anita Payne; 594; 0.9%	Nikita Mahood; 499; 0.7%		Dan Muys; Flamborough—Glanbrook
Hamilton Centre	Aslam Rana; 21,388; 37.6%	Hayden Lawrence; 17,079; 30.0%	Matthew Green; 16,581; 29.1%	Sandy Crawley; 818; 1.4%	David Speicher; 591; 1.0%	Cody Chenier (Rhino.); 190 0.3%	Matthew Green
Hamilton Centre	Aslam Rana; 21,388; 37.6%	Hayden Lawrence; 17,079; 30.0%	Matthew Green; 16,581; 29.1%	Sandy Crawley; 818; 1.4%	David Speicher; 591; 1.0%	Carla Green (NA); 215 0.4%	Matthew Green
Hamilton Centre	Aslam Rana; 21,388; 37.6%	Hayden Lawrence; 17,079; 30.0%	Matthew Green; 16,581; 29.1%	Sandy Crawley; 818; 1.4%	David Speicher; 591; 1.0%	Michael Loomans (NA); 90 0.2%	Matthew Green
Hamilton East—Stoney Creek	Chad Collins; 31,378; 46.5%	Ned Kuruc; 32,857; 48.7%	Nayla Mithani; 2,471; 3.7%		Jim Boutsikakis; 762; 1.1%		Chad Collins
Hamilton Mountain	Lisa Hepfner; 27,302; 45.6%	Ken Hewitt; 24,857; 41.5%	Monique Taylor; 7,044; 11.8%		Bing Wong; 497; 0.8%	Rolf Gerstenberger (M-L); 193; 0.3%	Lisa Hepfner
Hamilton West—Ancaster—Dundas	John-Paul Danko; 38,970; 56.1%	Erika Alexander; 25,547; 36.8%	Roberto Henriquez; 3,648; 5.3%	Georgia Beauchemin; 829; 1.2%	Ava Sharavi; 307; 0.4%	Jim Enos (CHP); 163; 0.2%	Filomena Tassi^{$}
Niagara Falls—Niagara-on-the-Lake	Andrea Kaiser; 27,199; 44.9%	Tony Baldinelli; 29,774; 49.1%	Shannon Mitchell; 2,335; 3.9%	Celia Taylor; 518; 0.9%	Dinah Althorpe; 481; 0.8%	Yawar Anwar (Cent.); 128 0.2%	Tony Baldinelli; Niagara Falls
Niagara Falls—Niagara-on-the-Lake	Andrea Kaiser; 27,199; 44.9%	Tony Baldinelli; 29,774; 49.1%	Shannon Mitchell; 2,335; 3.9%	Celia Taylor; 518; 0.9%	Dinah Althorpe; 481; 0.8%	Daniel Shakhmundes (Libert.); 160 0.3%	Tony Baldinelli; Niagara Falls
Niagara South	Vance Badawey; 33,708; 43.9%	Fred Davies; 36,702; 47.8%	Chantal McCollum; 4,307; 5.6%	Natashia Bergen; 683; 0.9%	Peter Taras; 1,147; 1.5%	David Vedova (CHP); 216; 0.3%	Vance Badawey; Niagara Centre
Niagara West	Jennifer Korstanje; 30,424; 43.2%	Dean Allison; 36,418; 51.7%	Justin Abando; 2,262; 3.2%		Ryan Anderson; 582; 0.8%	Dave Bylsma (CHP); 727; 1.0%	Dean Allison
St. Catharines	Chris Bittle; 34,750; 52.0%	Bas Sluijmers; 27,013; 40.4%	Karen Orlandi; 4,021; 6.0%		Dennis Wilson; 522; 0.8%	Taha Alexander Haj-Ahmad (Cent.); 198 0.3%	Chris Bittle
St. Catharines	Chris Bittle; 34,750; 52.0%	Bas Sluijmers; 27,013; 40.4%	Karen Orlandi; 4,021; 6.0%		Dennis Wilson; 522; 0.8%	Christopher Reilly (Ind.); 306 0.5%	Chris Bittle

==== Midwestern Ontario ====
Electoral district	Candidates						Incumbent
Electoral district	Liberal	Conservative	NDP	Green	PPC	Other	Incumbent
Brantford—Brant South—Six Nations	Joy O'Donnell; 27,032; 41.1%	Larry Brock; 34,501; 52.4%	Anne Gajerski-Cauley; 2,410; 3.7%	Karleigh Csordas; 1,110; 1.7%	Nicholas Xenos; 392; 0.6%	Leslie Bory (Ind.); 120 0.2%	Larry Brock; Brantford—Brant
Brantford—Brant South—Six Nations	Joy O'Donnell; 27,032; 41.1%	Larry Brock; 34,501; 52.4%	Anne Gajerski-Cauley; 2,410; 3.7%	Karleigh Csordas; 1,110; 1.7%	Nicholas Xenos; 392; 0.6%	Mike Clancy (Ind.); 148 0.2%	Larry Brock; Brantford—Brant
Brantford—Brant South—Six Nations	Joy O'Donnell; 27,032; 41.1%	Larry Brock; 34,501; 52.4%	Anne Gajerski-Cauley; 2,410; 3.7%	Karleigh Csordas; 1,110; 1.7%	Nicholas Xenos; 392; 0.6%	Clo Marie (Ind.); 80 0.1%	Larry Brock; Brantford—Brant
Cambridge	Bryan May; 30,309; 46.3%	Connie Cody; 31,766; 48.6%	José de Lima; 2,183; 3.3%	Lux Burgess; 1,052; 1.6%		Manuel Couto (M-L); 109; 0.2%	Bryan May
Guelph	Dominique O'Rourke; 36,406; 54.7%	Gurvir Khaira; 20,470; 30.7%	Janice Folk-Dawson; 2,129; 3.2%	Anne-Marie Zajdlik; 6,779; 10.2%	Jeffrey Swackhammer; 498; 0.7%	Elaine Baetz (M-L); 132 0.2%	Lloyd Longfield†
Guelph	Dominique O'Rourke; 36,406; 54.7%	Gurvir Khaira; 20,470; 30.7%	Janice Folk-Dawson; 2,129; 3.2%	Anne-Marie Zajdlik; 6,779; 10.2%	Jeffrey Swackhammer; 498; 0.7%	Michael Wassilyn (Ind.); 117 0.2%	Lloyd Longfield†
Guelph	Dominique O'Rourke; 36,406; 54.7%	Gurvir Khaira; 20,470; 30.7%	Janice Folk-Dawson; 2,129; 3.2%	Anne-Marie Zajdlik; 6,779; 10.2%	Jeffrey Swackhammer; 498; 0.7%	Yurii Yavorskyi (CFP); 62 0.1%	Lloyd Longfield†
Haldimand—Norfolk	Colin Walsh; 26,040; 36.4%	Leslyn Lewis; 41,218; 57.6%	Shannon Horner-Shepherd; 2,412; 3.4%	Nathan Hawkins; 750; 1.0%	Henry Geissler; 657; 0.9%	Lily Eggink (CHP); 529; 0.7%	Leslyn Lewis
Huron—Bruce	James Rice; 28,936; 41.5%	Ben Lobb; 37,027; 53.2%	Melanie Burrett; 2,300; 3.3%	Gregory J McLean; 927; 1.3%		Caesar salad Pella (Ind.); 194 0.3%	Ben Lobb
Huron—Bruce	James Rice; 28,936; 41.5%	Ben Lobb; 37,027; 53.2%	Melanie Burrett; 2,300; 3.3%	Gregory J McLean; 927; 1.3%		Justin L Smith (Ind.); 273 0.4%	Ben Lobb
Kitchener Centre	Brian Adeba; 17,292; 29.3%	Kelly DeRidder; 20,234; 34.2%	Heather Zaleski; 1,157; 2.0%	Mike Morrice; 19,859; 33.6%	Wasai Rahimi; 334; 0.6%	Margaretha Dyck (UP); 97 0.2%	Mike Morrice
Kitchener Centre	Brian Adeba; 17,292; 29.3%	Kelly DeRidder; 20,234; 34.2%	Heather Zaleski; 1,157; 2.0%	Mike Morrice; 19,859; 33.6%	Wasai Rahimi; 334; 0.6%	Ellen Papenburg (APP); 111 0.2%	Mike Morrice
Kitchener—Conestoga	Tim Louis; 30,001; 48.3%	Doug Treleaven; 29,479; 47.5%	Maya Bozorgzad; 1,821; 2.9%		Kevin Dupuis; 786; 1.3%		Tim Louis
Kitchener South—Hespeler	Valerie Bradford; 27,945; 46.2%	Matt Strauss; 28,973; 47.9%	Lorne Bruce; 1,823; 3.0%	Ethan Russell; 1,208; 2.0%	Randall Williams; 386; 0.6%	Kathleen Dueck (UP); 96; 0.2%	Valerie Bradford
Oxford	David Hilderley; 27,311; 38.2%	Arpan Khanna; 38,191; 53.4%	Matthew Chambers; 3,046; 4.3%	Cheryle Baker; 897; 1.3%	Steven Beausoleil; 642; 0.9%	Melanie Van Brugge (UP); 152 0.2%	Arpan Khanna
Oxford	David Hilderley; 27,311; 38.2%	Arpan Khanna; 38,191; 53.4%	Matthew Chambers; 3,046; 4.3%	Cheryle Baker; 897; 1.3%	Steven Beausoleil; 642; 0.9%	Akshay Varun Raj Vardhan (Ind.); 109 0.2%	Arpan Khanna
Oxford	David Hilderley; 27,311; 38.2%	Arpan Khanna; 38,191; 53.4%	Matthew Chambers; 3,046; 4.3%	Cheryle Baker; 897; 1.3%	Steven Beausoleil; 642; 0.9%	Jacob Watson (CHP); 1,203 1.7%	Arpan Khanna
Perth—Wellington	David Mackey; 26,142; 40.8%	John Nater; 33,972; 53.0%	Kevin Kruchkywich; 2,909; 4.5%		Wayne Baker; 1,069; 1.7%		John Nater
Waterloo	Bardish Chagger; 37,579; 59.5%	Waseem Botros; 20,571; 32.6%	Héline Chow; 2,617; 4.1%	Simon Guthrie; 1,599; 2.5%	Douglas Ross; 348; 0.6%	Santa Claus Chatham (Rhino.); 119 0.2%	Bardish Chagger
Waterloo	Bardish Chagger; 37,579; 59.5%	Waseem Botros; 20,571; 32.6%	Héline Chow; 2,617; 4.1%	Simon Guthrie; 1,599; 2.5%	Douglas Ross; 348; 0.6%	Jamie Hari (Ind.); 76 0.1%	Bardish Chagger
Waterloo	Bardish Chagger; 37,579; 59.5%	Waseem Botros; 20,571; 32.6%	Héline Chow; 2,617; 4.1%	Simon Guthrie; 1,599; 2.5%	Douglas Ross; 348; 0.6%	Val Neekman (Ind.); 179 0.3%	Bardish Chagger
Waterloo	Bardish Chagger; 37,579; 59.5%	Waseem Botros; 20,571; 32.6%	Héline Chow; 2,617; 4.1%	Simon Guthrie; 1,599; 2.5%	Douglas Ross; 348; 0.6%	Hans Roach (Ind.); 105 0.2%	Bardish Chagger
Wellington—Halton Hills North	Sean Carscadden; 29,609; 44.4%	Michael Chong; 33,736; 50.6%	Andrew Bascombe; 1,346; 2.0%	Liam Stiles; 1,389; 2.1%	Syl Carle; 566; 0.8%		Michael Chong; Wellington—Halton Hills

==== Southwestern Ontario ====
Electoral district	Candidates						Incumbent
Electoral district	Liberal	Conservative	NDP	Green	PPC	Other	Incumbent
Chatham-Kent—Leamington	Keith Pickard; 25,978; 35.9%	Dave Epp; 41,612; 57.5%	Seamus McInnis Fleming; 2,943; 4.1%	James Plunkett; 757; 1.0%	Trevor Lee; 1,061; 1.5%		Dave Epp
Elgin—St. Thomas—London South	David Goodwin; 28,010; 43.1%	Andrew Lawton; 32,565; 50.1%	Paul Pighin; 3,118; 4.8%		Stephen Campbell; 1,256; 1.9%		Karen Vecchio^{$} Elgin—Middlesex—London
Essex	Chris Sutton; 29,389; 36.7%	Chris Lewis; 46,123; 57.5%	Lori Wightman; 3,826; 4.8%		Jason A. E. Henry; 843; 1.1%		Chris Lewis
London Centre	Peter Fragiskatos; 33,999; 56.7%	Stephen Gallant; 18,633; 31.1%	Dirka Prout; 5,790; 9.7%	Mary Ann Hodge; 878; 1.5%	David Annis; 523; 0.9%	Bruce Lamb (CFP); 100; 0.2%	Peter Fragiskatos; London North Centre
London—Fanshawe	Najam Naqvi; 17,863; 30.5%	Kurt Holman; 23,749; 40.6%	Lindsay Mathyssen; 16,135; 27.6%		Daniel Buta; 776; 1.3%		Lindsay Mathyssen
London West	Arielle Kayabaga; 35,309; 56.2%	Adam Benni; 23,239; 37.0%	Shinade Allder; 3,463; 5.5%	Jeff Vanderzwet; 427; 0.7%		Russell Benner (CFP); 185 0.3%	Arielle Kayabaga
London West	Arielle Kayabaga; 35,309; 56.2%	Adam Benni; 23,239; 37.0%	Shinade Allder; 3,463; 5.5%	Jeff Vanderzwet; 427; 0.7%		Christine Oliver (UP); 185 0.3%	Arielle Kayabaga
Middlesex—London	Kent Keenan; 29,400; 42.1%	Lianne Rood; 36,093; 51.7%	Taylor McIntosh; 2,888; 4.1%	Jim Johnston; 698; 1.0%	Cynthia Workman; 577; 0.8%	Shawn Cartlidge (UP); 191; 0.3%	Lianne Rood; Lambton—Kent—Middlesex
Sarnia—Lambton—Bkejwanong	George Vandenberg; 28,940; 37.9%	Marilyn Gladu; 40,597; 53.1%	Lo-Anne Chan; 4,088; 5.4%		Brian Everaert; 1,136; 1.5%	**Jacques Y Boudreau** (Libert.); 990 1.3%	Marilyn Gladu; Sarnia—Lambton
Sarnia—Lambton—Bkejwanong	George Vandenberg; 28,940; 37.9%	Marilyn Gladu; 40,597; 53.1%	Lo-Anne Chan; 4,088; 5.4%		Brian Everaert; 1,136; 1.5%	Mark Lamore (CHP); 437 0.6%	Marilyn Gladu; Sarnia—Lambton
Sarnia—Lambton—Bkejwanong	George Vandenberg; 28,940; 37.9%	Marilyn Gladu; 40,597; 53.1%	Lo-Anne Chan; 4,088; 5.4%		Brian Everaert; 1,136; 1.5%	Tony Mitchell (Rhino.); 201 0.3%	Marilyn Gladu; Sarnia—Lambton
Windsor—Tecumseh—Lakeshore (judicially certified)	Irek Kusmierczyk; 32,086; 45.7%	Kathy Borrelli; 32,090; 45.8%	Alex Ilijoski; 4,240; 6.0%	Roxanne Tellier; 468; 0.7%	Nick Babic; 828; 1.2%	Helmi Charif (Cent.); 223 0.3%	Irek Kusmierczyk; Windsor—Tecumseh
Windsor—Tecumseh—Lakeshore (judicially certified)	Irek Kusmierczyk; 32,086; 45.7%	Kathy Borrelli; 32,090; 45.8%	Alex Ilijoski; 4,240; 6.0%	Roxanne Tellier; 468; 0.7%	Nick Babic; 828; 1.2%	Beth St Denis (CHP); 203 0.3%	Irek Kusmierczyk; Windsor—Tecumseh
Windsor West	Richard Pollock; 16,986; 30.9%	Harb Gill; 21,412; 39.0%	Brian Masse; 15,256; 27.8%	Louay Ahmad; 397; 0.7%	Jacob Bezaire; 553; 1.0%	Joseph Markham (Comm.); 195 0.4%	Brian Masse
Windsor West	Richard Pollock; 16,986; 30.9%	Harb Gill; 21,412; 39.0%	Brian Masse; 15,256; 27.8%	Louay Ahmad; 397; 0.7%	Jacob Bezaire; 553; 1.0%	Margaret Villamizar (M-L); 89 0.2%	Brian Masse

==== Northern Ontario ====
Electoral district	Candidates						Incumbent
Electoral district	Liberal	Conservative	NDP	Green	PPC	Other	Incumbent
Kapuskasing—Timmins—Mushkegowuk	Steve Black; 18,366; 39.0%	Gaétan Malette; 23,062; 48.9%	Nicole Fortier Levesque; 4,895; 10.4%		Serge Lefebvre; 814; 1.7%		Charlie Angus†; Timmins—James Bay
Kenora—Kiiwetinoong	Charles Fox; 9,454; 35.2%	Eric Melillo; 13,109; 48.7%	Tania Cameron; 3,698; 13.8%	Jon Hobbs; 286; 1.1%	Bryce Desjarlais; 204; 0.8%	Kelvin Boucher-Chicago (Ind.); 141; 0.5%	Eric Melillo; Kenora
Nipissing—Timiskaming	Pauline Rochefort; 27,674; 47.2%	Garry Keller; 26,121; 44.6%	Valerie Kennedy; 3,548; 6.1%	Louise Poitras; 585; 1.0%	John Janssen; 648; 1.1%		Anthony Rota†
Parry Sound—Muskoka	Geordie Sabbagh; 27,563; 42.6%	Scott Aitchison; 33,742; 52.2%	Heather Hay; 2,300; 3.6%		Isabel Pereira; 1,048; 1.6%		Scott Aitchison
Sault Ste. Marie—Algoma	Terry Sheehan; 30,936; 47.4%	Hugh Stevenson; 29,208; 44.7%	Laura Mayer; 4,327; 6.6%	Robyn Kiki Eshkibok; 541; 0.8%		James Collins (CHP); 305; 0.5%	Terry Sheehan; Sault Ste. Marie
Sault Ste. Marie—Algoma	Terry Sheehan; 30,936; 47.4%	Hugh Stevenson; 29,208; 44.7%	Laura Mayer; 4,327; 6.6%	Robyn Kiki Eshkibok; 541; 0.8%		James Collins (CHP); 305; 0.5%	Merged District
Sault Ste. Marie—Algoma	Terry Sheehan; 30,936; 47.4%	Hugh Stevenson; 29,208; 44.7%	Laura Mayer; 4,327; 6.6%	Robyn Kiki Eshkibok; 541; 0.8%		James Collins (CHP); 305; 0.5%	Carol Hughes†; Algoma—Manitoulin—Kapuskasing
Sudbury	Viviane Lapointe; 31,551; 51.9%	Ian Symington; 23,835; 39.2%	Nadia Verrelli; 4,680; 7.7%		Nicholas Bonderoff; 773; 1.3%		Viviane Lapointe
Sudbury East—Manitoulin—Nickel Belt	Marc G. Serré; 25,075; 41.6%	Jim Belanger; 29,156; 48.3%	Andréane Chénier; 4,822; 8.0%	Himal Hossain; 465; 0.8%	Sharilynne St. Louis; 489; 0.8%	Justin Dean Newell Leroux (Libert.); 316; 0.5%	Marc Serré; Nickel Belt
Thunder Bay—Rainy River	Marcus Powlowski; 21,125; 48.5%	Brendan Hyatt; 18,685; 42.9%	Yuk-Sem Won; 2,954; 6.8%	Eric Arner; 334; 0.8%	Sabrina Ree; 433; 1.0%		Marcus Powlowski
Thunder Bay—Superior North	Patty Hajdu; 25,134; 55.2%	Bob Herman; 16,267; 35.7%	Joy Wakefield; 3,235; 7.1%	John Malcolm Northey; 417; 0.9%	Amos Bradley; 459; 1.0%		Patty Hajdu

=== Manitoba ===
==== Rural Manitoba ====
Electoral district	Candidates						Incumbent
Electoral district	Liberal	Conservative	NDP	Green	PPC	United	Incumbent
Brandon—Souris	Ghazanfar Ali Tarar; 10,766; 23.4%	Grant Jackson; 28,624; 62.2%	Quentin Robinson; 6,637; 14.4%				Larry Maguire^{$}
Churchill—Keewatinook Aski	Rebecca Chartrand; 9,313; 45.5%	Lachlan De Nardi; 4,927; 24.1%	Niki Ashton; 5,880; 28.7%		Dylan Young; 349; 1.7%		Niki Ashton
Portage—Lisgar	Robert Kreis; 10,493; 22.8%	Branden Leslie; 31,889; 69.4%	Lisa Tessier; 2,011; 4.4%	Janine G. Gibson; 595; 1.3%	Kevin Larson; 977; 2.1%		Branden Leslie
Provencher	Trevor Kirczenow; 13,394; 25.9%	Ted Falk; 34,364; 66.3%	Brandy Schmidt; 2,398; 4.6%	Blair Mahaffy; 705; 1.4%	Noël Gautron; 942; 1.8%		Ted Falk
Riding Mountain	Terry Hayward; 9,281; 22.2%	Dan Mazier; 28,409; 67.8%	Andrew Douglas Maxwell; 3,072; 7.3%	Liz Clayton; 547; 1.3%	Jim Oliver; 564; 1.3%		Dan Mazier; Dauphin—Swan River—Neepawa
Selkirk—Interlake—Eastman	Rhonda Nichol; 16,570; 30.4%	James Bezan; 32,788; 60.2%	Josef Estabrooks; 3,535; 6.5%	Wayne James; 709; 1.3%	Byron Gryba; 473; 0.9%	Chris Riddell; 404; 0.7%	James Bezan

==== Winnipeg ====
Electoral district	Candidates						Incumbent
Electoral district	Liberal	Conservative	NDP	Green	PPC	Other	Incumbent
Elmwood—Transcona	Ian MacIntyre; 10,512; 22.4%	Colin Reynolds; 19,463; 41.6%	Leila Dance; 16,138; 34.5%	Nicolas Geddert; 321; 0.7%	Collin Watson; 396; 0.8%		Leila Dance
Kildonan—St. Paul	Thomas Naaykens; 24,808; 44.7%	Raquel Dancho; 26,364; 47.5%	Emily Clark; 3,863; 7.0%		Erik Holmes; 486; 0.9%		Raquel Dancho
St. Boniface—St. Vital	Ginette Lavack; 32,599; 59.8%	Shola Agboola; 17,625; 32.3%	Thomas Linner; 3,773; 6.9%		Gilles Pelletier; 523; 1.0%		Dan Vandal^{$} Saint Boniface—Saint Vital
Winnipeg Centre	Rahul Walia; 12,138; 35.4%	Tom Bambrick; 7,658; 22.3%	Leah Gazan; 13,524; 39.4%	Gary Gervais; 389; 1.1%	Donald Grant; 367; 1.1%	Debra Wall (APP); 213; 0.6%	Leah Gazan
Winnipeg North	Kevin Lamoureux; 19,792; 57.9%	Rachel Punzalan; 11,740; 34.4%	Adebayo Akinrogunde; 2,059; 6.0%	Angela Brydges; 194; 0.6%	Jessica Bailon; 274; 0.8%	Sarah Borbridge (Comm.); 114; 0.3%	Kevin Lamoureux
Winnipeg South	Terry Duguid; 27,337; 59.0%	Janice Morley-Lecomte; 16,252; 35.1%	Joanne Bjornson; 2,114; 4.6%	Manjit Kaur; 231; 0.5%	Johann Rempel Fehr; 385; 0.8%		Terry Duguid
Winnipeg South Centre	Ben Carr; 33,834; 63.6%	Royden Brousseau; 14,748; 27.7%	Jorge Requena Ramos; 3,463; 6.5%	Chris Petriew; 450; 0.8%	Jaclyn Cummings; 272; 0.5%	Tait Palsson (Ind.); 97 0.2%	Ben Carr
Winnipeg South Centre	Ben Carr; 33,834; 63.6%	Royden Brousseau; 14,748; 27.7%	Jorge Requena Ramos; 3,463; 6.5%	Chris Petriew; 450; 0.8%	Jaclyn Cummings; 272; 0.5%	Cam Scott (Comm.); 314 0.6%	Ben Carr
Winnipeg West	Doug Eyolfson; 30,276; 54.5%	Marty Morantz; 22,659; 40.8%	Avery Selby-Lyons; 2,218; 4.0%	Dennis Bayomi; 438; 0.8%			Marty Morantz; Charleswood—St. James—Assiniboia—Headingley

=== Saskatchewan ===
==== Southern Saskatchewan ====
Electoral district	Candidates						Incumbent
Electoral district	Liberal	Conservative	NDP	Green	PPC	Other	Incumbent
Moose Jaw—Lake Centre—Lanigan	Tabitha Mukamusoni; 7,661; 16.7%	Fraser Tolmie; 32,991; 71.9%	Britt Baumann; 3,458; 7.5%	Mike Gardiner; 411; 0.9%	Chey Craik; 1,358; 3.0%		Fraser Tolmie
Regina—Lewvan	Mac Hird; 18,893; 43.0%	Warren Steinley; 21,988; 50.0%	Ray Aldinger; 2,573; 5.9%	Michael Wright; 272; 0.6%	Godwin Ezizor; 243; 0.6%		Warren Steinley
Regina—Qu'Appelle	Rahima Mian; 11,391; 27.0%	Andrew Scheer; 27,024; 64.0%	Chris Simmie; 3,388; 8.0%		Dionne Fehler; 441; 1.0%		Andrew Scheer
Regina—Wascana	Jeffrey Walters; 19,252; 43.7%	Michael Kram; 22,072; 50.1%	Kaitlyn Stadnyk; 2,138; 4.9%	Kimberly Epp; 289; 0.7%	Peter Bruce; 326; 0.7%		Michael Kram
Souris—Moose Mountain	Aziz Mian; 4,051; 9.8%	Steven Bonk; 34,793; 84.0%	Sheena Muirhead Koops; 1,888; 4.6%	Remi Rheault; 235; 0.6%		Lyndon Dayman (CFP); 304 0.7%	Robert Kitchen†
Souris—Moose Mountain	Aziz Mian; 4,051; 9.8%	Steven Bonk; 34,793; 84.0%	Sheena Muirhead Koops; 1,888; 4.6%	Remi Rheault; 235; 0.6%		Travis Patron (Ind.); 157 0.4%	Robert Kitchen†
Swift Current—Grasslands—Kindersley	William Caton; 4,420; 11.2%	Jeremy Patzer; 32,292; 82.0%	Alex McPhee; 2,250; 5.7%			Maria Rose Lewans (Ind.); 426; 1.1%	Jeremy Patzer; Cypress Hills—Grasslands
Yorkton—Melville	Luke Guimond; 5,338; 14.4%	Cathay Wagantall; 28,702; 77.5%	Michaela Krakowetz; 2,034; 5.5%	Valerie Brooks; 713; 1.9%		Alec Guggenmos (Libert.); 226; 0.6%	Cathay Wagantall

==== Northern Saskatchewan ====
Electoral district	Candidates					Incumbent
Electoral district	Liberal	Conservative	NDP	Green	Other	Incumbent
Battlefords—Lloydminster—Meadow Lake	Larry Ingram; 7,073; 18.7%	Rosemarie Falk; 28,634; 75.8%	William Petryk; 1,816; 4.8%		Darrell Patan (CFP); 264; 0.7%	Rosemarie Falk; Battlefords—Lloydminster
Carlton Trail—Eagle Creek	Katelyn Zimmer; 8,008; 17.0%	Kelly Block; 36,427; 77.4%	Cheryl Loadman; 2,616; 5.6%			Kelly Block
Desnethé—Missinippi—Churchill River	Buckley Belanger; 5,876; 65.1%	Jim Lemaigre; 2,301; 25.5%	Doug Racine; 850; 9.4%			Gary Vidal†
Prince Albert	Christopher Hadubiak; 7,451; 19.2%	Randy Hoback; 27,763; 71.5%	Virginia Kutzan; 3,630; 9.3%			Randy Hoback
Saskatoon South	Rokhan Sarwar; 20,107; 40.4%	Kevin Waugh; 24,516; 49.3%	Jacob Gadzella; 4,515; 9.1%	Hamish Graham; 310; 0.6%	Richard Brent Wintringham (PPC); 308; 0.6%	Kevin Waugh; Saskatoon—Grasswood
Saskatoon—University	Greg Poelzer; 19,622; 41.4%	Corey Tochor; 23,178; 48.9%	Melissa McGillivray; 4,035; 8.5%	Isaiah Hunter; 263; 0.6%	Jaxson Boot (PPC); 327; 0.7%	Corey Tochor
Saskatoon West	Chad Eggerman; 10,254; 27.2%	Brad Redekopp; 19,814; 52.7%	Rachel Loewen Walker; 7,187; 19.1%	Naomi Hunter; 376; 1.0%		Brad Redekopp

=== Alberta ===
==== Southern Rural Alberta ====
Electoral district	Candidates							Incumbent
Electoral district	Liberal	Conservative	NDP	Green	PPC	Christian Heritage	Other	Incumbent
Airdrie—Cochrane	Sean Secord; 16,714; 23.7%	Blake Richards; 50,252; 71.2%	Sarah Zagoda; 2,591; 3.7%			Christopher Bell; 380; 0.5%	David Sabine (Libert.); 623; 0.9%	Blake Richards; Banff—Airdrie
Battle River—Crowfoot	Brent Sutton; 7,566; 11.7%	Damien Kurek; 53,684; 82.8%	James MacKay; 2,061; 3.2%	Douglas Gook; 474; 0.7%	Jonathan Bridges; 1,022; 1.6%			Damien Kurek
Bow River	Bentley Barnes; 9,562; 16.9%	David Bexte; 44,605; 78.9%	Louisa Gwin; 1,689; 3.0%			Tom Lipp; 402; 0.7%	Aaron Patton (UP); 296; 0.5%	Martin Shields^{$}
Foothills	John Bruinsma; 13,706; 19.1%	John Barlow; 54,874; 76.3%	Kaitte Aurora; 1,923; 2.7%	Emma Hoberg; 589; 0.8%	Paul O'Halloran; 796; 1.1%			John Barlow
Lethbridge	Chris Spearman; 21,899; 32.7%	Rachael Thomas; 40,866; 61.1%	Nathan Svoboda; 2,431; 3.6%	Amber Murray; 457; 0.7%	Clara Piedalue; 478; 0.7%	Marc Slingerland; 806; 1.2%		Rachael Thomas
Medicine Hat—Cardston—Warner	Tom Rooke; 9,554; 17.7%	Glen Motz; 41,518; 76.7%	Jocelyn Johnson; 2,588; 4.8%	Andy Shadrack; 440; 0.8%				Glen Motz
Ponoka—Didsbury		Blaine Calkins; 56,106; 81.8%	Logan Hooley; 7,414; 10.8%		Larry Gratton; 1,289; 1.9%		**Grant Abraham** (UP); 2,129 3.1%	Blaine Calkins; Red Deer—Lacombe
Ponoka—Didsbury		Blaine Calkins; 56,106; 81.8%	Logan Hooley; 7,414; 10.8%		Larry Gratton; 1,289; 1.9%		Zarnab Zafar (NA); 1,641 2.4%	Blaine Calkins; Red Deer—Lacombe
Red Deer	Ayaz Bangash; 13,564; 21.9%	Burton Bailey; 44,239; 71.6%	Elias Assefa; 2,375; 3.8%	Ashley MacDonald; 618; 1.0%	Kyla Courte; 813; 1.3%	Brandon Pringle; 219; 0.4%		Earl Dreeshen^{$} Red Deer—Mountain View
Yellowhead	Michael Fark; 17,469; 25.2%	William Stevenson; 47,863; 69.1%	Avni Soma; 2,753; 4.0%		Vicky Bayford; 952; 1.4%	Dale Heath; 253; 0.4%		Gerald Soroka§

==== Northern Rural Alberta ====
Electoral district	Candidates						Incumbent
Electoral district	Liberal	Conservative	NDP	Green	PPC	Other	Incumbent
Fort McMurray—Cold Lake	Kaitlyn Staines; 7,193; 14.5%	Laila Goodridge; 39,649; 80.2%	You-Ju Choi; 1,337; 2.7%	Brian Deheer; 290; 0.6%	Alan Clarke; 896; 1.8%	Kulbir Chawla (Ind.); 101; 0.2%	Laila Goodridge
Grande Prairie	Maureen Mcleod; 6,946; 11.8%	Chris Warkentin; 47,904; 81.7%	Jennifer Villebrun; 2,460; 4.2%		Shawn McLean; 828; 1.4%	Donovan Eckstrom (Rhino.); 291 0.5%	Chris Warkentin; Grande Prairie—Mackenzie
Grande Prairie	Maureen Mcleod; 6,946; 11.8%	Chris Warkentin; 47,904; 81.7%	Jennifer Villebrun; 2,460; 4.2%		Shawn McLean; 828; 1.4%	Elliot McDavid (Ind.); 223 0.4%	Chris Warkentin; Grande Prairie—Mackenzie
Lakeland	Barry Milaney; 6,886; 12.2%	Shannon Stubbs; 45,826; 81.0%	Des Bissonnette; 2,153; 3.8%	Bridget Burns; 411; 0.7%	Michael Manchen; 982; 1.7%	Micheal Speirs (CHP); 335; 0.6%	Shannon Stubbs
Leduc—Wetaskiwin	Ronald Brochu; 11,136; 17.4%	Mike Lake; 47,947; 74.7%	Katherine Swampy; 3,927; 6.1%		Jose Flores; 688; 1.1%	Kirk Cayer (UP); 318 0.5%	Mike Lake; Edmonton—Wetaskiwin
Leduc—Wetaskiwin	Ronald Brochu; 11,136; 17.4%	Mike Lake; 47,947; 74.7%	Katherine Swampy; 3,927; 6.1%		Jose Flores; 688; 1.1%	Christopher Everingham (CFP); 145 0.2%	Mike Lake; Edmonton—Wetaskiwin
Parkland	Ashley Fearnall; 12,690; 17.8%	Dane Lloyd; 53,468; 75.2%	Keri Goad; 2,949; 4.1%	Daniel Birrell; 449; 0.6%	Jason Lavigne; 1,066; 1.5%	Wade Klassen (UP); 287 0.4%	Dane Lloyd; Sturgeon River—Parkland
Parkland	Ashley Fearnall; 12,690; 17.8%	Dane Lloyd; 53,468; 75.2%	Keri Goad; 2,949; 4.1%	Daniel Birrell; 449; 0.6%	Jason Lavigne; 1,066; 1.5%	Kevin Schulthies (CHP); 198 0.3%	Dane Lloyd; Sturgeon River—Parkland
Peace River—Westlock	Luke Markowski; 6,278; 11.8%	Arnold Viersen; 41,130; 77.1%	Landen Tischer; 2,913; 5.5%			Darrell Teske (Ind.); 3,048; 5.7%	Arnold Viersen
Sherwood Park—Fort Saskatchewan	Tanya Holm; 22,178; 27.2%	Garnett Genuis; 54,131; 66.3%	Chris Jones; 4,136; 5.1%	Randall Emmons; 448; 0.5%	Jay Sobel; 497; 0.6%	Mark Horseman (CFP); 237; 0.3%	Garnett Genuis
St. Albert—Sturgeon River	Lucia Stachurski; 22,977; 29.9%	Michael Cooper; 49,216; 63.9%	Dorothy Anderson; 3,684; 4.8%		Brigitte Cecelia; 820; 1.1%	Jeff Willerton (CHP); 264; 0.3%	Michael Cooper; St. Albert—Edmonton

==== Edmonton ====
Electoral district	Candidates						Incumbent
Electoral district	Liberal	Conservative	NDP	Green	PPC	Other	Incumbent
Edmonton Centre	Eleanor Olszewski; 24,138; 44.3%	Sayid Ahmed; 20,626; 37.9%	Trisha Estabrooks; 8,440; 15.5%		John Ross; 468; 0.9%	Gregory Bell (Ind.); 155 0.3%	Randy Boissonnault^{$}
Edmonton Centre	Eleanor Olszewski; 24,138; 44.3%	Sayid Ahmed; 20,626; 37.9%	Trisha Estabrooks; 8,440; 15.5%		John Ross; 468; 0.9%	Ronald S. Billingsley Jr. (Ind.); 106 0.2%	Randy Boissonnault^{$}
Edmonton Centre	Eleanor Olszewski; 24,138; 44.3%	Sayid Ahmed; 20,626; 37.9%	Trisha Estabrooks; 8,440; 15.5%		John Ross; 468; 0.9%	David John Bohonos (CHP); 158 0.3%	Randy Boissonnault^{$}
Edmonton Centre	Eleanor Olszewski; 24,138; 44.3%	Sayid Ahmed; 20,626; 37.9%	Trisha Estabrooks; 8,440; 15.5%		John Ross; 468; 0.9%	Mike Dutcher (Ind.); 137 0.3%	Randy Boissonnault^{$}
Edmonton Centre	Eleanor Olszewski; 24,138; 44.3%	Sayid Ahmed; 20,626; 37.9%	Trisha Estabrooks; 8,440; 15.5%		John Ross; 468; 0.9%	Merryn Edwards de la O (M-L); 67 0.1%	Randy Boissonnault^{$}
Edmonton Centre	Eleanor Olszewski; 24,138; 44.3%	Sayid Ahmed; 20,626; 37.9%	Trisha Estabrooks; 8,440; 15.5%		John Ross; 468; 0.9%	Naomi Rankin (Comm.); 133 0.2%	Randy Boissonnault^{$}
Edmonton Gateway	Jeremy Hoefsloot; 19,435; 37.3%	Tim Uppal; 26,385; 50.6%	Madeline Mayes; 2,565; 4.9%		Paul McCormack; 474; 0.9%	Rod Loyola (NA); 2,455 4.7%	Tim Uppal; Edmonton Mill Woods
Edmonton Gateway	Jeremy Hoefsloot; 19,435; 37.3%	Tim Uppal; 26,385; 50.6%	Madeline Mayes; 2,565; 4.9%		Paul McCormack; 474; 0.9%	Ashok Patel (Ind.); 838 1.6%	Tim Uppal; Edmonton Mill Woods
Edmonton Griesbach	Patrick Lennox; 8,973; 18.3%	Kerry Diotte; 22,256; 45.5%	Blake Desjarlais; 16,717; 34.1%	Michael Hunter; 302; 0.6%	Thomas Matty; 318; 0.6%	Alex Boykowich (Comm.); 146 0.3%	Blake Desjarlais
Edmonton Griesbach	Patrick Lennox; 8,973; 18.3%	Kerry Diotte; 22,256; 45.5%	Blake Desjarlais; 16,717; 34.1%	Michael Hunter; 302; 0.6%	Thomas Matty; 318; 0.6%	Mary Joyce (M-L); 64 0.1%	Blake Desjarlais
Edmonton Griesbach	Patrick Lennox; 8,973; 18.3%	Kerry Diotte; 22,256; 45.5%	Blake Desjarlais; 16,717; 34.1%	Michael Hunter; 302; 0.6%	Thomas Matty; 318; 0.6%	Brent Tyson (CFP); 72 0.1%	Blake Desjarlais
Edmonton Griesbach	Patrick Lennox; 8,973; 18.3%	Kerry Diotte; 22,256; 45.5%	Blake Desjarlais; 16,717; 34.1%	Michael Hunter; 302; 0.6%	Thomas Matty; 318; 0.6%	Crystal Vargas (Ind.); 118 0.2%	Blake Desjarlais
Edmonton Manning	Blair-Marie Coles; 17,603; 35.3%	Ziad Aboultaif; 26,445; 53.1%	Lesley Thompson; 4,935; 9.9%		Robert Bard; 824; 1.7%		Ziad Aboultaif
Edmonton Northwest	Lindsey Machona; 20,907; 38.3%	Billy Morin; 29,194; 53.4%	Omar Abubakar; 3,597; 6.6%	Colleen Rice; 335; 0.6%	Albert Carson; 593; 1.1%		New District
Edmonton Riverbend	Mark Minenko; 27,075; 44.8%	Matt Jeneroux; 30,343; 50.2%	Susan Cake; 2,563; 4.2%		Dwayne Dudiak; 410; 0.7%		Matt Jeneroux
Edmonton Southeast	Amarjeet Sohi; 18,481; 38.8%	Jagsharan Singh Mahal; 25,206; 52.9%	Harpreet Grewal; 2,536; 5.3%		Martin Schuetza; 881; 1.8%	Corinne Benson (Comm.); 268 0.6%	New District
Edmonton Southeast	Amarjeet Sohi; 18,481; 38.8%	Jagsharan Singh Mahal; 25,206; 52.9%	Harpreet Grewal; 2,536; 5.3%		Martin Schuetza; 881; 1.8%	Gurleen Chandi (Ind.); 292 0.6%	New District
Edmonton Strathcona	Ron Thiering; 10,709; 17.9%	Miles Berry; 19,768; 33.1%	Heather McPherson; 28,027; 47.0%	Atul Deshmukh; 366; 0.6%	David Joel Wojtowicz; 386; 0.6%	Christian Bourque (Comm.); 181 0.3%	Heather McPherson
Edmonton Strathcona	Ron Thiering; 10,709; 17.9%	Miles Berry; 19,768; 33.1%	Heather McPherson; 28,027; 47.0%	Atul Deshmukh; 366; 0.6%	David Joel Wojtowicz; 386; 0.6%	Graham Lettner (Ind.); 250 0.4%	Heather McPherson
Edmonton West	Brad Fournier; 23,995; 40.7%	Kelly McCauley; 31,201; 52.9%	Sean McQuillan; 3,164; 5.4%		Brent Kinzel; 534; 0.9%	Peggy Morton (M-L); 121; 0.2%	Kelly McCauley

==== Calgary ====
Electoral district	Candidates						Incumbent
Electoral district	Liberal	Conservative	NDP	Green	PPC	Other	Incumbent
Calgary Centre	Lindsay Luhnau; 28,824; 45.8%	Greg McLean; 31,604; 50.2%	Beau Shaw; 1,665; 2.6%	Jayden Baldonado; 362; 0.6%	Robert Hawley; 365; 0.6%	Scott Fea (Rhino.); 126; 0.2%	Greg McLean
Calgary Confederation	Corey Hogan; 33,112; 48.1%	Jeremy Nixon; 31,839; 46.3%	Keira Gunn; 2,844; 4.1%	Richard Willott; 400; 0.6%	Artyom Ovsepyan; 302; 0.4%	Kevan Hunter (M-L); 144 0.2%	Len Webber^{$}
Calgary Confederation	Corey Hogan; 33,112; 48.1%	Jeremy Nixon; 31,839; 46.3%	Keira Gunn; 2,844; 4.1%	Richard Willott; 400; 0.6%	Artyom Ovsepyan; 302; 0.4%	Jeffrey Reid Marsh (CFP); 198 0.3%	Len Webber^{$}
Calgary Crowfoot	Shahnaz Munir; 25,386; 37.4%	Pat Kelly; 39,971; 58.8%	Jim Samuelson; 1,741; 2.6%	Nanette Nerland; 346; 0.5%	Yvonne Snyder; 360; 0.5%	Lachlan Van Egmond (Ind.); 131; 0.2%	Pat Kelly; Calgary Rocky Ridge
Calgary East	Priti Obhrai-Martin; 17,062; 31.8%	Jasraj Hallan; 32,490; 60.5%	Jennifer Geha; 2,092; 3.9%	Carey Rutherford; 664; 1.2%	Harry Dhillon; 908; 1.7%	Garry Dirk (CHP); 321 0.6%	Jasraj Singh Hallan; Calgary Forest Lawn
Calgary East	Priti Obhrai-Martin; 17,062; 31.8%	Jasraj Hallan; 32,490; 60.5%	Jennifer Geha; 2,092; 3.9%	Carey Rutherford; 664; 1.2%	Harry Dhillon; 908; 1.7%	Jonathan Trautman (Comm.); 137 0.3%	Jasraj Singh Hallan; Calgary Forest Lawn
Calgary Heritage	Scott Arnott; 23,673; 34.6%	Shuv Majumdar; 42,088; 61.4%	Becki Zimmerman; 1,691; 2.5%	Ravenmoon Crocker; 493; 0.7%		Chris Galas (Ind.); 280 0.4%	Shuvaloy Majumdar
Calgary Heritage	Scott Arnott; 23,673; 34.6%	Shuv Majumdar; 42,088; 61.4%	Becki Zimmerman; 1,691; 2.5%	Ravenmoon Crocker; 493; 0.7%		Larry R. Heather (CHP); 268 0.4%	Shuvaloy Majumdar
Calgary McKnight	George Chahal; 19,546; 46.0%	Dalwinder Gill; 20,863; 49.1%	Arlington Antonio Santiago; 1,204; 2.8%	Evelyn Tanaka; 273; 0.6%	Najeeb Butt; 323; 0.8%	Benjamin Cridland (CFP); 162 0.4%	New District
Calgary McKnight	George Chahal; 19,546; 46.0%	Dalwinder Gill; 20,863; 49.1%	Arlington Antonio Santiago; 1,204; 2.8%	Evelyn Tanaka; 273; 0.6%	Najeeb Butt; 323; 0.8%	Syed Hasnain (Cent.); 107 0.3%	New District
Calgary Midnapore	Sunjiv Raval; 21,979; 29.9%	Stephanie Kusie; 48,131; 65.5%	Austin Mullins; 2,271; 3.1%	Adam Delgado; 495; 0.7%	Colin Kindret; 556; 0.8%		Stephanie Kusie
Calgary Nose Hill	Tom Becker; 22,276; 36.2%	Michelle Rempel Garner; 36,597; 59.4%	Ahmed Khan; 1,975; 3.2%	Addison Fach; 430; 0.7%		Peggy Askin (M-L); 115 0.2%	Michelle Rempel Garner
Calgary Nose Hill	Tom Becker; 22,276; 36.2%	Michelle Rempel Garner; 36,597; 59.4%	Ahmed Khan; 1,975; 3.2%	Addison Fach; 430; 0.7%		Vanessa Wang (Rhino.); 199 0.3%	Michelle Rempel Garner
Calgary Shepard	Gul Khan; 18,421; 28.2%	Tom Kmiec; 44,363; 68.0%	Tory Tomblin; 1,780; 2.7%	Robert Frasch; 302; 0.5%	Donald Legere; 383; 0.6%		Tom Kmiec
Calgary Signal Hill	Bryndis Whitson; 25,174; 36.4%	David GL McKenzie; 41,638; 60.1%	Khalis Ahmed; 1,656; 2.4%		Grant Strem; 492; 0.7%	Paul Godard (CFP); 265; 0.4%	Ron Liepert†
Calgary Skyview	Hafeez Malik; 18,842; 37.6%	Amanpreet S. Gill; 27,808; 55.4%	Rajesh Angral; 1,351; 2.7%			Jag Anand (Ind.); 529 1.1%	George Chahal‡ (Running in Calgary McKnight)
Calgary Skyview	Hafeez Malik; 18,842; 37.6%	Amanpreet S. Gill; 27,808; 55.4%	Rajesh Angral; 1,351; 2.7%			Scott Calverley (Ind.); 620 1.2%	George Chahal‡ (Running in Calgary McKnight)
Calgary Skyview	Hafeez Malik; 18,842; 37.6%	Amanpreet S. Gill; 27,808; 55.4%	Rajesh Angral; 1,351; 2.7%			Minesh Patel (Ind.); 1,002 2.0%	George Chahal‡ (Running in Calgary McKnight)

=== British Columbia ===
==== BC Interior ====
Electoral district	Candidates						Incumbent
Electoral district	Liberal	Conservative	NDP	Green	PPC	Other	Incumbent
Cariboo—Prince George	Clinton Emslie; 19,243; 30.4%	Todd Doherty; 38,175; 60.3%	Angie Bonazzo; 3,900; 6.2%	Jodie Capling; 1,155; 1.8%	Rudy Sans; 436; 0.7%	Kenneth B. Thomson (Ind.); 208 0.3%	Todd Doherty
Cariboo—Prince George	Clinton Emslie; 19,243; 30.4%	Todd Doherty; 38,175; 60.3%	Angie Bonazzo; 3,900; 6.2%	Jodie Capling; 1,155; 1.8%	Rudy Sans; 436; 0.7%	Jake Wiens (CHP); 174 0.3%	Todd Doherty
Columbia—Kootenay—Southern Rockies	Reggie Goldsbury; 20,184; 28.2%	Rob Morrison; 36,081; 50.4%	Kallee Lins; 12,871; 18.0%	Steven Maffioli; 1,064; 1.5%	Laurie Baird; 486; 0.7%	James Wiedrick (Ind.); 856; 1.2%	Rob Morrison; Kootenay—Columbia
Kamloops—Shuswap—Central Rockies	Ken Robertson; 26,529; 39.0%	Mel Arnold; 35,556; 52.2%	Phaedra Idzan; 3,730; 5.5%	Owen Madden; 1,639; 2.4%	John Michael Henry; 602; 0.9%		Mel Arnold; North Okanagan—Shuswap
Kamloops—Thompson—Nicola	Iain Currie; 24,961; 40.2%	Frank Caputo; 32,008; 51.5%	Miguel Godau; 3,681; 5.9%	Jenna Lindley; 936; 1.5%	Chris Enns; 516; 0.8%		Frank Caputo; Kamloops—Thompson—Cariboo
Kelowna	Stephen Fuhr; 28,702; 48.8%	Tracy Gray; 27,620; 46.9%	Trevor McAleese; 1,941; 3.3%	Catriona Wright; 578; 1.0%			Tracy Gray; Kelowna—Lake Country
Okanagan Lake West—South Kelowna	Juliette Sicotte; 28,827; 44.2%	Dan Albas; 33,219; 50.9%	Harpreet Badohal; 2,189; 3.4%	Louise Lecouffe; 602; 0.9%	Debbie Robinson; 307; 0.5%	Gary Suddard (CFP); 90; 0.1%	Dan Albas; Central Okanagan—Similkameen—Nicola
Prince George—Peace River—Northern Rockies	Peter Njenga; 11,545; 19.6%	Bob Zimmer; 41,956; 71.1%	Cory Grizz Longley; 3,542; 6.0%	Mary Forbes; 1,259; 2.1%	David Watson; 690; 1.2%		Bob Zimmer
Similkameen—South Okanagan—West Kootenay	Gloria Morgan; 25,431; 37.3%	Helena Konanz; 30,054; 44.1%	Linda Sankey; 11,033; 16.2%	Philip Mansfield; 1,044; 1.5%	Barry Dewar; 654; 1.0%		Richard Cannings†; South Okanagan—West Kootenay
Skeena—Bulkley Valley	Inderpal Dhillon; 4,923; 11.0%	Ellis Ross; 21,202; 47.2%	Taylor Bachrach; 17,677; 39.3%	Adeana Young; 528; 1.2%		**Rod Taylor** (CHP); 602; 1.3%	Taylor Bachrach
Vernon—Lake Country—Monashee	Anna Warwick Sears; 28,769; 42.8%	Scott Anderson; 33,850; 50.4%	Leah Ellen Main; 3,417; 5.1%	Blair Visscher; 1,105; 1.6%			New District

==== Fraser Valley and Eastern Lower Mainland ====
Electoral district	Candidates						Incumbent
Electoral district	Liberal	Conservative	NDP	Green	PPC	Other	Incumbent
Abbotsford—South Langley	Kevin Gillies; 18,969; 33.9%	Sukhman Gill; 24,116; 43.1%	Dharmasena Yakandawela; 2,104; 3.8%	Melissa Snazell; 577; 1.0%	Aeriol Alderking; 459; 0.8%	Michael de Jong (Ind.); 9,747; 17.4%	Ed Fast†; Abbotsford
Chilliwack—Hope	Zeeshan Khan; 23,254; 35.4%	Mark Strahl; 36,027; 54.8%	Teri Westerby; 4,779; 7.3%	Salina Derish; 1,083; 1.6%	Jeff Galbraith; 482; 0.7%	Christopher Adam (UP); 129; 0.2%	Mark Strahl
Cloverdale—Langley City	Kyle Latchford; 24,828; 46.4%	Tamara Jansen; 25,606; 47.8%	Vanessa Sharma; 2,350; 4.4%	Kevin Daniel Wilkie; 493; 0.9%	Jim McMurtry; 289; 0.5%		Tamara Jansen
Langley Township—Fraser Heights	John Aldag; 28,034; 42.9%	Tako Van Popta; 33,574; 51.4%	Holly Isaac; 2,611; 4.0%	Debora Soutar; 491; 0.8%	Sepehr Haghighat; 303; 0.5%	Alex Joehl (Libert.); 347; 0.5%	Tako van Popta; Langley—Aldergrove
Mission—Matsqui—Abbotsford	Jeff Howe; 21,838; 36.6%	Brad Vis; 33,791; 56.7%	Jules Côté; 2,745; 4.6%	John Kidder; 723; 1.2%	Kevin Sinclair; 502; 0.8%		Brad Vis; Mission—Matsqui—Fraser Canyon
Pitt Meadows—Maple Ridge	Angie Rowell; 30,728; 45.6%	Marc Dalton; 31,924; 47.4%	Daniel Heydenrych; 4,141; 6.2%		Chris Lehner; 368; 0.5%	Peter Buddle (Rhino.); 172; 0.3%	Marc Dalton

==== Surrey, Richmond and Delta ====
Electoral district	Candidates						Incumbent
Electoral district	Liberal	Conservative	NDP	Green	PPC	Communist	Incumbent
Delta	Jill McKnight; 32,802; 51.8%	Jessy Sahota; 27,314; 43.2%	Jason McCormick; 2,787; 4.4%		Natasa Sirotic; 390; 0.6%		Carla Qualtrough†
Fleetwood—Port Kells	Gurbux Saini; 23,250; 47.9%	Sukh Pandher; 21,439; 44.2%	Shannon Permal; 2,885; 5.9%	Murali Krishnan; 460; 0.9%	John Hetherington; 499; 1.0%		Ken Hardie†
Richmond Centre—Marpole	Wilson Miao; 21,232; 44.7%	Chak Au; 23,532; 49.6%	Martin Li; 2,109; 4.4%	Michael Sisler; 420; 0.9%	David Wang; 193; 0.4%		Wilson Miao; Richmond Centre
Richmond East—Steveston	Parm Bains; 25,705; 48.4%	Zach Segal; 24,605; 46.4%	Keefer Pelech; 2,251; 4.2%	Steven Ji; 494; 0.9%			Parm Bains; Steveston—Richmond East
South Surrey—White Rock	Ernie Klassen; 33,094; 50.5%	Kerry-Lynne Findlay; 29,924; 45.7%	Jureun Park; 1,634; 2.5%	Christine Kinnie; 875; 1.3%			Kerry-Lynne Findlay
Surrey Centre	Randeep Sarai; 19,900; 48.0%	Rajvir Dhillon; 17,920; 43.2%	Dominic Denofrio; 2,811; 6.8%	Krishan Khurana; 395; 1.0%	Beverly Tanchak; 246; 0.6%	Ryan Abbott; 182; 0.4%	Randeep Sarai
Surrey Newton	Sukh Dhaliwal; 20,263; 49.5%	Harjit Singh Gill; 18,023; 44.0%	Raj Singh Toor; 2,467; 6.0%			Salman Zafar; 222; 0.5%	Sukh Dhaliwal; Surrey—Newton

==== Northern Lower Mainland ====
Electoral district	Candidates						Incumbent
Electoral district	Liberal	Conservative	NDP	Green	PPC	Other	Incumbent
Burnaby Central	Wade Chang; 21,745; 42.2%	James Yan; 19,889; 38.6%	**Jagmeet Singh**; 9,353; 18.2%		Richard Farbridge; 506; 1.0%		**Jagmeet Singh**; Burnaby South
Burnaby North—Seymour	Terry Beech; 37,829; 59.1%	Mauro Francis; 21,742; 33.9%	Michael Charrois; 4,121; 6.4%		Jesse Fulton; 366; 0.6%		Terry Beech
Coquitlam—Port Coquitlam	Ron McKinnon; 27,250; 47.4%	Iain Black; 24,730; 43.0%	Laura Dupont; 4,253; 7.4%	Michael Peter Glenister; 504; 0.9%		Lewis Clarke Dahlby (Libert.); 785; 1.4%	Ron McKinnon
New Westminster—Burnaby—Maillardville	Jake Sawatzky; 19,547; 35.1%	Indy Panchi; 17,507; 31.4%	Peter Julian; 17,574; 31.5%	Tara Shushtarian; 690; 1.2%		Lourence Almonte Singh (Ind.); 385; 0.7%	Peter Julian; New Westminster—Burnaby
North Vancouver—Capilano	Jonathan Wilkinson; 37,907; 59.8%	Stephen Curran; 21,339; 33.7%	Tammy Bentz; 2,684; 4.2%	Andrew Robinson; 1,076; 1.7%	Ehsan Arjmand; 256; 0.4%	Oliver King (Ind.); 102; 0.2%	Jonathan Wilkinson; North Vancouver
Port Moody—Coquitlam	Zoe Royer; 27,074; 43.5%	Paul Lambert; 25,126; 40.4%	Bonita Zarrillo; 9,360; 15.0%	Nash Milani; 519; 0.8%		Roland Verrier (M-L); 117; 0.2%	Bonita Zarrillo
West Vancouver—Sunshine Coast—Sea to Sky Country	Patrick Weiler; 38,384; 59.7%	Keith Roy; 21,181; 33.0%	Jäger Rosenberg; 2,070; 3.2%	Lauren Greenlaw; 2,205; 3.4%	Peyman Askari; 308; 0.5%	Gordon Jeffrey (Rhino.); 99; 0.2%	Patrick Weiler

==== Vancouver ====
Electoral district	Candidates						Incumbent
Electoral district	Liberal	Conservative	NDP	Green	PPC	Other	Incumbent
Vancouver Centre	Hedy Fry; 29,855; 55.2%	Elaine Allan; 16,368; 30.3%	Avi Lewis; 6,807; 12.6%	Scott MacDonald; 757; 1.4%	Christopher Varga; 211; 0.4%	Drew William McPherson (Ind.); 63; 0.1%	Hedy Fry
Vancouver East	Mark Wiens; 20,287; 35.5%	Lita Cabal; 10,162; 17.8%	Jenny Kwan; 24,945; 43.6%	Nikida Steel; 1,099; 1.9%	Meghan Emily Murphy; 329; 0.6%	Kimball Cariou (Comm.); 329; 0.6%	Jenny Kwan
Vancouver Fraserview—South Burnaby	Gregor Robertson; 27,117; 52.3%	Avi Nayyar; 18,500; 35.7%	Manoj Bhangu; 5,088; 9.8%	Alexander Dow; 658; 1.3%	Desiderio Magtanggol "Bon" Reyes; 482; 0.9%		Harjit Sajjan^{$} Vancouver South
Vancouver Granville	Taleeb Noormohamed; 37,010; 62.1%	Marie Rogers; 17,133; 28.8%	Sukhi Singh Sahota; 4,489; 7.5%	Jerry Kroll; 945; 1.6%			Taleeb Noormohamed
Vancouver Kingsway	Amy K. Gill; 18,485; 36.6%	Ravinder Bhatia; 12,352; 24.5%	Don Davies; 18,788; 37.2%	Imtiaz Popat; 499; 1.0%	Fiona Wang; 322; 0.6%		Don Davies
Vancouver Quadra	Wade Grant; 35,384; 63.2%	Ken Charko; 17,008; 30.4%	Alim Fakirani; 2,391; 4.3%	Tom Digby; 1,032; 1.8%	John Odan Ede; 182; 0.3%		Joyce Murray^{$}

==== Vancouver Island ====
Electoral district	Candidates						Incumbent
Electoral district	Liberal	Conservative	NDP	Green	PPC	Other	Incumbent
Courtenay—Alberni	Brian Cameron; 18,078; 22.7%	Kris McNichol; 28,028; 35.1%	Gord Johns; 31,617; 39.6%	Chris Markevich; 1,352; 1.7%	Thomas Gamble; 427; 0.5%	Teresa Knight (APP); 195 0.2%	Gord Johns
Courtenay—Alberni	Brian Cameron; 18,078; 22.7%	Kris McNichol; 28,028; 35.1%	Gord Johns; 31,617; 39.6%	Chris Markevich; 1,352; 1.7%	Thomas Gamble; 427; 0.5%	Jesse Musial (CHP); 69 0.1%	Gord Johns
Cowichan—Malahat—Langford	Blair Herbert; 21,478; 28.2%	Jeff Kibble; 28,370; 37.2%	Alistair MacGregor; 24,826; 32.6%	Kathleen Code; 1,500; 2.0%			Alistair MacGregor
Esquimalt—Saanich—Sooke	Stephanie McLean; 36,181; 49.3%	Grant Cool; 21,082; 28.7%	Maja Tait; 13,666; 18.6%	Ben Homer-Dixon; 1,959; 2.7%		Param Bhatti (Ind.); 152 0.2%	Vacant
Esquimalt—Saanich—Sooke	Stephanie McLean; 36,181; 49.3%	Grant Cool; 21,082; 28.7%	Maja Tait; 13,666; 18.6%	Ben Homer-Dixon; 1,959; 2.7%		Robert Crooks (Comm.); 136 0.2%	Vacant
Esquimalt—Saanich—Sooke	Stephanie McLean; 36,181; 49.3%	Grant Cool; 21,082; 28.7%	Maja Tait; 13,666; 18.6%	Ben Homer-Dixon; 1,959; 2.7%		David Schaafsma (CHP); 159 0.2%	Vacant
Nanaimo—Ladysmith	Michelle Corfield; 20,656; 27.8%	Tamara Kronis; 26,381; 35.5%	Lisa Marie Barron; 13,586; 18.3%	Paul Manly; 13,485; 18.1%	Stephen Welton; 289; 0.4%		Lisa Marie Barron
North Island—Powell River	Jennifer Lash; 21,218; 26.2%	Aaron Gunn; 31,356; 38.7%	Tanille Johnston; 26,357; 32.6%	Jessica Wegg; 1,505; 1.9%	Paul Macknight; 341; 0.4%	Glen Staples (Ind.); 152; 0.2%	Rachel Blaney†
Saanich—Gulf Islands	David Beckham; 25,409; 31.8%	Cathie Ounsted; 20,015; 25.1%	Colin Plant; 3,163; 4.0%	**Elizabeth May**; 31,199; 39.1%			**Elizabeth May**
Victoria	Will Greaves; 41,128; 54.3%	Angus Ross; 12,870; 17.0%	Laurel Collins; 18,877; 24.9%	Michael Doherty; 2,350; 3.1%	David Mohr; 278; 0.4%	Steve Filipovic (Ind.); 73 0.1%	Laurel Collins
Victoria	Will Greaves; 41,128; 54.3%	Angus Ross; 12,870; 17.0%	Laurel Collins; 18,877; 24.9%	Michael Doherty; 2,350; 3.1%	David Mohr; 278; 0.4%	Cody Fraser (Rhino.); 109 0.1%	Laurel Collins
Victoria	Will Greaves; 41,128; 54.3%	Angus Ross; 12,870; 17.0%	Laurel Collins; 18,877; 24.9%	Michael Doherty; 2,350; 3.1%	David Mohr; 278; 0.4%	Mary Moreau (CHP); 83 0.1%	Laurel Collins

=== Nunavut ===
Electoral district	Candidates			Incumbent
Electoral district	Liberal	Conservative	NDP	Incumbent
Nunavut	Kilikvak Kabloona; 2,812; 36.7%	James T. Arreak; 1,992; 26.0%	Lori Idlout; 2,853; 37.3%	Lori Idlout

=== Northwest Territories ===
Electoral district	Candidates				Incumbent
Electoral district	Liberal	Conservative	NDP	Green	Incumbent
Northwest Territories	Rebecca Alty; 8,855; 53.5%	Kimberly Fairman; 5,513; 33.3%	Kelvin Kotchilea; 2,011; 12.2%	Rainbow Eyes; 170; 1.0%	Michael McLeod†

=== Yukon ===
Electoral district	Candidates				Incumbent
Electoral district	Liberal	Conservative	NDP	Green	Incumbent
Yukon	Brendan Hanley; 12,009; 53.1%	Ryan Leef; 8,719; 38.5%	Katherine McCallum; 1,434; 6.3%	Gabrielle Dupont; 474; 2.1%	Brendan Hanley

== See also ==
- 2025 Canadian federal election
- New Democratic Party candidates in the 2025 Canadian federal election
