= 2025 Canadian federal election in Ontario =

- April 28, 2025

All 122 of Ontario's seats in the House of Commons
- Registered: 10,965,118
- Turnout: 7,576,590 (69.1%)
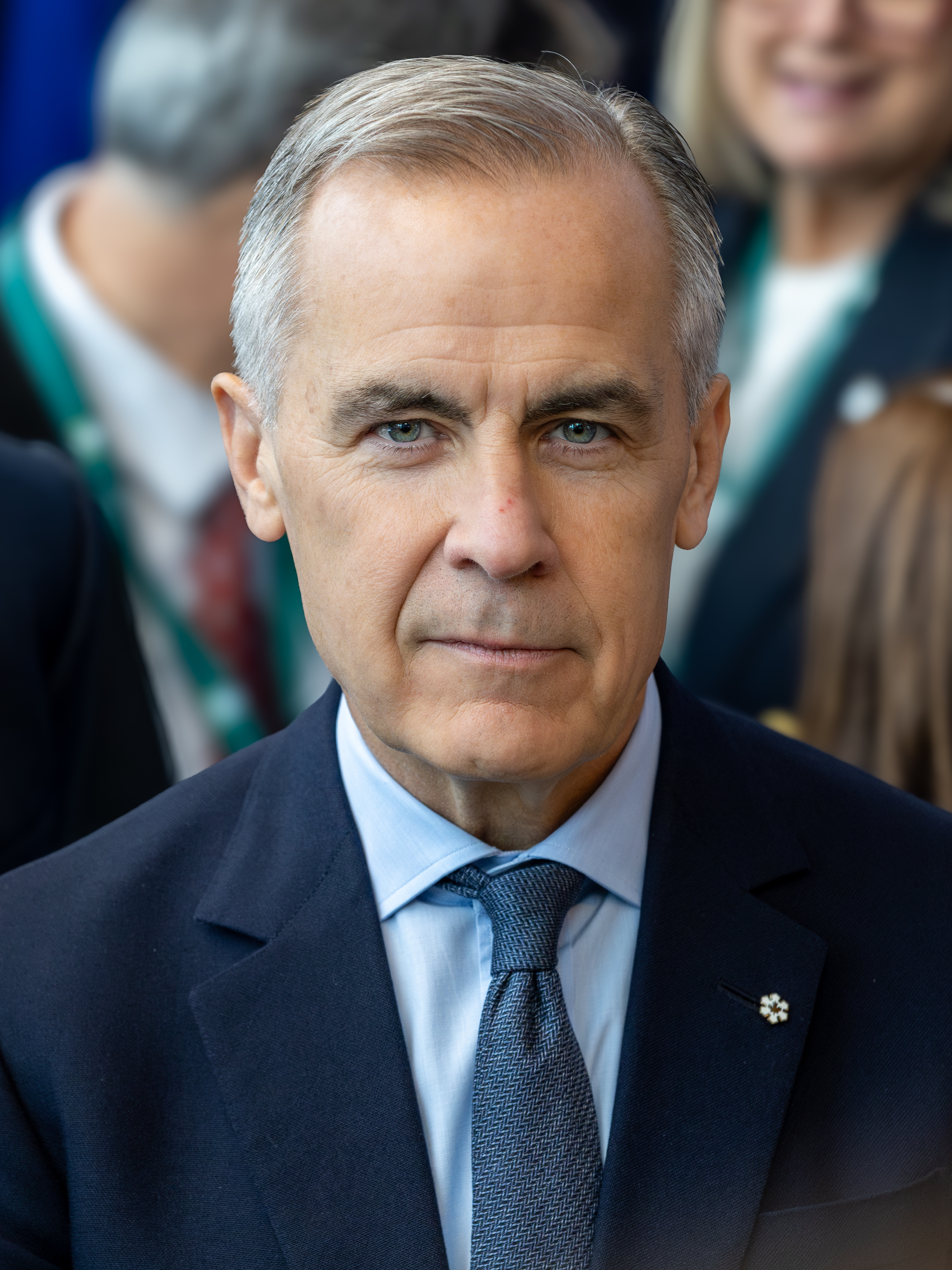

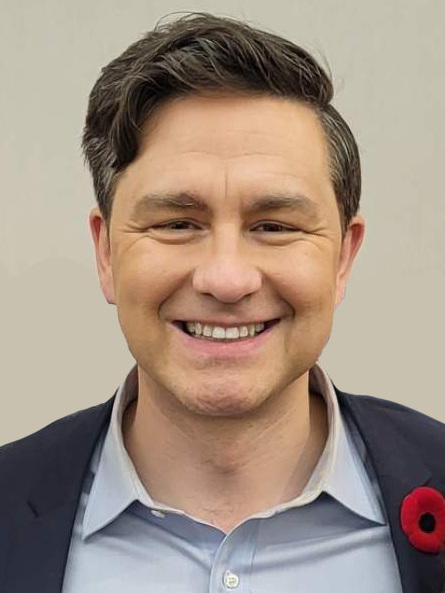

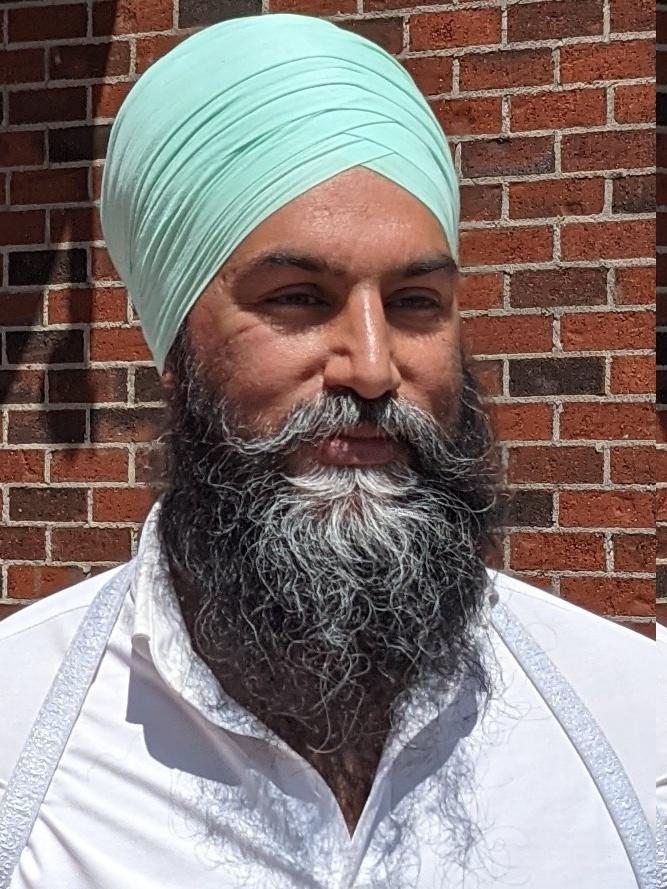

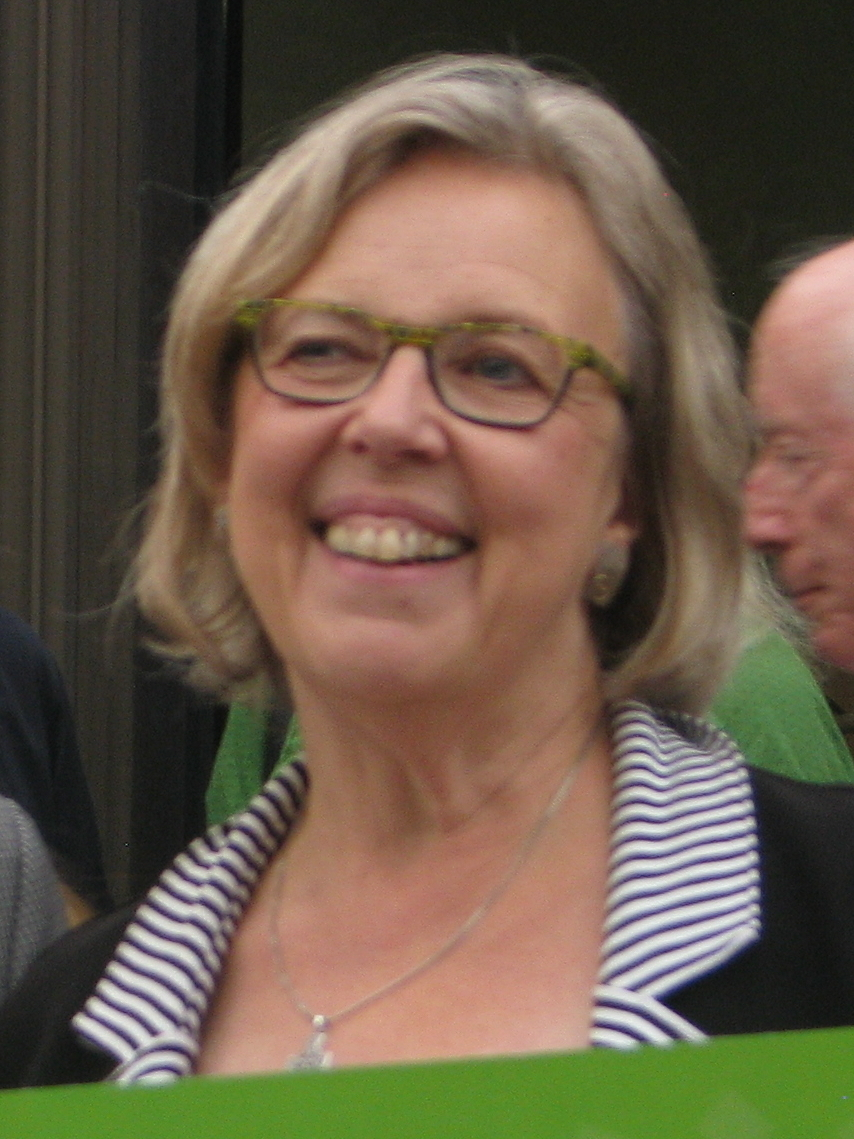

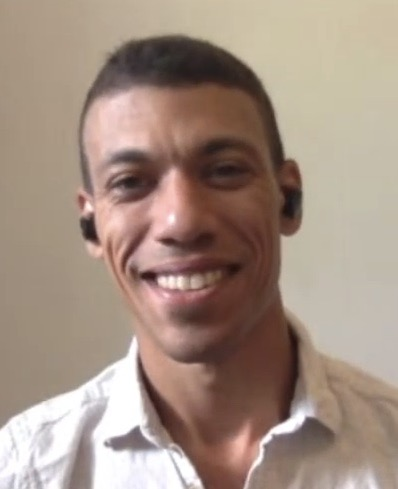
	First party	Second party
Leader	Mark Carney	Pierre Poilievre
Party	Liberal	Conservative
Leader since	March 9, 2025	September 10, 2022
Last election	78 seats (Note: While formal results show the Liberals winning 78 seats in Ontario, those totals include Kevin Vuong, who was disavowed during the campaign by his party, and sat as an independent in the House of Commons.), 39.3%	37 seats, 34.9%
Seats before	74	38
Seats won	70	52
Seat change	▼4	▲14
Popular vote	3,716,166	3,315,575
Percentage	49.0%	43.8%
Swing	▲9.7pp	▲8.9pp
	Third party	Fourth party
Leader	Jagmeet Singh	Elizabeth May & Jonathan Pedneault
Party	New Democratic	Green
Leader since	October 1, 2017	November 19, 2022 / February 4, 2025
Last election	5 seats, 17.8%	1 seats, 2.2%
Seats before	5	1
Seats won	0	0
Seat change	▼5	▼1
Popular vote	368,965	89,907
Percentage	4.9	1.2
Swing	▼12.9pp	▼1.0pp
Prime minister before election
Mark Carney
Liberal
Prime minister after election
Mark Carney
Liberal

In the 2025 Canadian federal election, 122 members of Parliament were elected to the House of Commons from the province of Ontario (35.6% of all members).

== Background ==
=== 2022 electoral redistribution ===
The 2025 Canadian federal election was the first election to utilize the electoral districts established following the 2022 Canadian federal electoral redistribution. The House of Commons increased from 338 seats to 343 seats, with Ontario gaining one seat in an increase from 121 to 122. This ensures that the average population per constituency in Ontario is 116,590 (according to the 2021 Canadian census), which is 8,742 more people per electoral district than the national average. Due to the redistribution, this was the first Canadian federal election where the city of Toronto has less seats than its surrounding suburban municipalities within the Greater Toronto Area.

2021 results transposed onto 2023 boundaries
Party	MPs		
Party	2021 actual result	2021 notional result	Change
Liberal	78	77	▼1
Conservative	37	40	▲3
New Democratic	5	4	▼1
Green	1	1	Steady
Total seats	121	122	1 ▲

=== Timeline ===
Changes in Ontario seats held (2021–2025)
Seat	Before				Change		
Seat	Date	Member	Party	Reason	Date	Member	Party
Spadina—Fort York	November 22, 2021	Kevin Vuong	█ Liberal	Excluded from caucus			█ Independent
Mississauga—Lakeshore	May 27, 2022	Sven Spengemann	█ Liberal	Resigned seat	December 22, 2022	Charles Sousa	█ Liberal
Oxford	January 28, 2023	Dave MacKenzie	█ Conservative	Resigned seat	June 19, 2023	Arpan Khanna	█ Conservative
Don Valley North	March 22, 2023	Han Dong	█ Liberal	Resigned from caucus			█ Independent
Durham	August 1, 2023	Erin O'Toole	█ Conservative	Resigned seat	March 4, 2024	Jamil Jivani	█ Conservative
Toronto—St. Paul's	January 16, 2024	Carolyn Bennett	█ Liberal	Resigned seat	June 24, 2024	Don Stewart	█ Conservative
Eglinton—Lawrence	March 13, 2025	Marco Mendicino	█ Liberal	Resigned seat	n/a (Note: By-elections are not scheduled to fill vancancies within 9 months of a fixed general election date.)	–	█ Vacant

=== Opinion polling ===
Polling firm	Last date of polling	Link	LPC	CPC	NDP	GPC	PPC	Others	Margin of error (Note: In cases when linked poll details distinguish between the margin of error associated with the total sample of respondents (including undecided and non-voters) and that of the subsample of decided/leaning voters, the former is included in the table. Also not included is the margin of error created by rounding to the nearest whole number or any margin of error from methodological sources. Most online polls (because of their opt-in method of recruiting panelists which results in a non-random sample) cannot have a margin of error. In such cases, shown is what the margin of error would be for a survey using a random probability-based sample of equivalent size.)	Sample size (Note: Refers to the total, "raw" sample size, including undecided and non-voters, and before demographic weighting is applied. Fractions in parentheses apply to rolling polls (see below) and indicate the proportion of the sample that is independent from the previous poll in the series.)	Polling method (Note: "Telephone" refers to traditional telephone polls conducted by live interviewers; "IVR" refers to automated Interactive Voice Response polls conducted by telephone; "online" refers to polls conducted exclusively over the internet; "telephone/online" refers to polls which combine results from both telephone and online surveys, or for which respondents are initially recruited by telephone and then asked to complete an online survey. "Rolling" polls contain overlapping data from one poll to the next.)	Lead
Campaign Research (Ontario PC internal)	March 26, 2025		48	33	11	4	-	4		1902	online	15
Mainstreet Research	February 17, 2025		41	39	13	2	2	2	± 2.7 pp	1,278 (1/3)	online (rolling)	2
Mainstreet Research	February 16, 2025		42	38	14	2	2	1	± 2.8 pp	1,229 (1/3)	online (rolling)	4
Mainstreet Research	February 15, 2025		41	39	13	2	2	2	± 2.8 pp	1,228 (1/3)	online (rolling)	2
Mainstreet Research	February 14, 2025		43	39	10	2	3	1	± 2.7 pp	1,272 (1/3)	online (rolling)	4
Mainstreet Research	February 13, 2025		43	41	8	3	2	2	± 2.7 pp	1,294 (1/3)	online (rolling)	2
Mainstreet Research	February 12, 2025		43	40	10	2	2	2	± 2.7 pp	1,314 (1/3)	online (rolling)	3
Mainstreet Research	February 11, 2025		43	39	10	2	2	2	± 2.7 pp	1,303 (1/3)	online (rolling)	4
Mainstreet Research	February 10, 2025		45	37	12	2	1	2	± 2.7 pp	1,301 (1/3)	online (rolling)	8
Mainstreet Research	February 9, 2025		43	39	9	5	2	2	± 2.7 pp	1,347 (1/3)	online (rolling)	4
Mainstreet Research	February 8, 2025		42	36	13	4	2	2	± 2.8 pp	1,187 (1/3)	online (rolling)	6
Mainstreet Research	February 7, 2025		44	36	12	4	2	2	± 2.8 pp	1,262 (1/3)	online (rolling)	8
Mainstreet Research	February 6, 2025		42	36	14	3	2	2	± 2.5 pp	1,515 (1/4)	online (rolling)	6
Mainstreet Research	February 5, 2025		42	37	12	4	2	2	± 2.8 pp	1,236 (1/3)	online (rolling)	5
Mainstreet Research	February 4, 2025		42	37	11	4	2	2	± 2.9 pp	1,162 (1/3)	online (rolling)	5
Mainstreet Research	February 3, 2025		43	39	9	4	2	2	± 3.0 pp	1,080 (1/3)	online (rolling)	4
Mainstreet Research	February 2, 2025		42	39	11	3	2	2	± 2.6 pp	1,374 (1/3)	online (rolling)	3
Mainstreet Research	February 1, 2025		41	40	13	3	2	2	± 2.9 pp	1,124 (1/3)	online (rolling)	1
Mainstreet Research	January 31, 2025		39	39	14	3	1	2	± 2.8 pp	1,247 (1/3)	online (rolling)	0
Mainstreet Research	January 30, 2025		40	39	13	5	2	2	± 2.4 pp	1,644 (1/3)	online (rolling)	1
Mainstreet Research	January 26, 2025		40	38	12	4	2	2	± 3.2 pp	936	online	2
Abacus Data	June 25, 2024		27	44	19	5	—N/a	5	± 3.1 pp	1,000	online	17
Abacus Data	May 15, 2024		29	45	17	4	—N/a	5	± 3.1 pp	1,000	online	16

== Predictions ==
=== Summary ===
Source	Ranking				
Source	Lib	Con	NDP	Green	As of
338Canada	82	37	2	1	28 April 2025

== Summary of results ==
Party	Votes	Vote %	Vote +/-	Seats	Seat +/-
Liberal	3,716,166	49.0%	▲9.7pp	70 / 122 (57%)	▼5
Conservative	3,315,575	43.8%	▲8.9pp	52 / 122 (43%)	▲15
New Democratic	368,965	4.9%	▼12.9pp	0 / 122 (0%)	▼5
Green	89,907	1.2%	▼1.0pp	0 / 122 (0%)	▼1
People's	54,376	0.7%	▼4.8pp	0 / 122 (0%)	Steady
Independent	10,321	0.1%	0pp	0 / 122 (0%)	▼2
Other	21,896	0.3%	▲0.1pp	0 / 122 (0%)	Steady
Total	7,576,590	100%	–	122 / 122 (100%)	▲2 (Note: Ontario gained 1 seat in the electoral redistribution. 1 seat was vacant at the dissolution of Parliament.)
Seat apportionment diagram:

=== Comparison with national results ===
Results by party
Party	Popular vote %			Seats in caucus
Party	ON	Natl.	diff.	Seats in caucus
Liberal	49.0	43.7	+5.3	70 / 169 (41%)
Conservative	43.8	41.3	+2.5	52 / 144 (36%)
New Democratic	4.9	6.3	-1.4	0 / 7 (0%)
Green	1.2	1.2	=	0 / 1 (0%)
People's	0.7	0.7	=	no caucus
Total	–	–	–	122 / 343 (36%)

== Results by riding ==
=== Ottawa ===
Electoral district	Candidates						Incumbent
Electoral district	Liberal	Conservative	NDP	Green	PPC	Other	Incumbent
Carleton; Details	Bruce Fanjoy; 43,846; 50.9%	Pierre Poilievre; 39,333; 45.7%	Beth Prokaska; 1,221; 1.4%	Mark Watson; 561; 0.7%		Karen Bourdeau (UP); 112 0.1%	Pierre Poilievre
Carleton; Details	Bruce Fanjoy; 43,846; 50.9%	Pierre Poilievre; 39,333; 45.7%	Beth Prokaska; 1,221; 1.4%	Mark Watson; 561; 0.7%		Sébastien CoRhino (Rhino.); 31 0.0%	Pierre Poilievre
Carleton; Details	Bruce Fanjoy; 43,846; 50.9%	Pierre Poilievre; 39,333; 45.7%	Beth Prokaska; 1,221; 1.4%	Mark Watson; 561; 0.7%		Danny Légaré (Mar.); 37 0.0%	Pierre Poilievre
Carleton; Details	Bruce Fanjoy; 43,846; 50.9%	Pierre Poilievre; 39,333; 45.7%	Beth Prokaska; 1,221; 1.4%	Mark Watson; 561; 0.7%		Shawn MacEachern (CFP); 63 0.1%	Pierre Poilievre
Carleton; Details	Bruce Fanjoy; 43,846; 50.9%	Pierre Poilievre; 39,333; 45.7%	Beth Prokaska; 1,221; 1.4%	Mark Watson; 561; 0.7%		LBC at bottom of table	Pierre Poilievre
Kanata	Jenna Sudds; 45,244; 60.8%	Greg Kung; 26,557; 35.7%	Melissa Simon; 1,702; 2.3%	Jennifer Purdy; 835; 1.1%		Moinuddin Siddiqui (Cent.); 122; 0.2%	Jenna Sudds; Kanata—Carleton
Nepean	Mark Carney; 46,073; 63.8%	Barbara Bal; 24,017; 33.2%	Shyam Shukla; 1,424; 2.0%	Greg Hopkins; 462; 0.6%	Eric Fleury; 261; 0.4%		Chandra Arya^{±}
Orléans	Marie-France Lalonde; 53,146; 67.4%	Steve Mansour; 22,072; 28.0%	Oulai B. Goué; 2,063; 2.6%	Jaycob Jacques; 652; 0.8%	Tafiqul Abu Mohammad; 331; 0.4%	Arlo Arrowsmith (Libert.); 301 0.4%	Marie-France Lalonde
Orléans	Marie-France Lalonde; 53,146; 67.4%	Steve Mansour; 22,072; 28.0%	Oulai B. Goué; 2,063; 2.6%	Jaycob Jacques; 652; 0.8%	Tafiqul Abu Mohammad; 331; 0.4%	Mazhar Choudhry (Ind.); 162 0.2%	Marie-France Lalonde
Orléans	Marie-France Lalonde; 53,146; 67.4%	Steve Mansour; 22,072; 28.0%	Oulai B. Goué; 2,063; 2.6%	Jaycob Jacques; 652; 0.8%	Tafiqul Abu Mohammad; 331; 0.4%	Arabella Vida (Ind.); 76 0.1%	Marie-France Lalonde
Ottawa Centre	Yasir Naqvi; 51,026; 62.7%	Paul D'Orsonnens; 12,692; 15.6%	Joel Harden; 15,935; 19.6%	Amanda Rosenstock; 916; 1.1%		Andrea Chabot (CFP); 268 0.3%	Yasir Naqvi
Ottawa Centre	Yasir Naqvi; 51,026; 62.7%	Paul D'Orsonnens; 12,692; 15.6%	Joel Harden; 15,935; 19.6%	Amanda Rosenstock; 916; 1.1%		Zed Chebib (Ind.); 47 0.1%	Yasir Naqvi
Ottawa Centre	Yasir Naqvi; 51,026; 62.7%	Paul D'Orsonnens; 12,692; 15.6%	Joel Harden; 15,935; 19.6%	Amanda Rosenstock; 916; 1.1%		Marie-Chantal Leriche (CHP); 234 0.3%	Yasir Naqvi
Ottawa Centre	Yasir Naqvi; 51,026; 62.7%	Paul D'Orsonnens; 12,692; 15.6%	Joel Harden; 15,935; 19.6%	Amanda Rosenstock; 916; 1.1%		Cashton Perry (Comm.); 154 0.2%	Yasir Naqvi
Ottawa Centre	Yasir Naqvi; 51,026; 62.7%	Paul D'Orsonnens; 12,692; 15.6%	Joel Harden; 15,935; 19.6%	Amanda Rosenstock; 916; 1.1%		Mike Salmon (Ind.); 66 0.1%	Yasir Naqvi
Ottawa South	David McGuinty; 43,388; 65.2%	Blair Turner; 18,010; 27.1%	Hena Masjedee; 4,017; 6.0%	Nira Dookeran; 642; 1.0%		William Cooper (Rhino.); 155 0.2%	David McGuinty
Ottawa South	David McGuinty; 43,388; 65.2%	Blair Turner; 18,010; 27.1%	Hena Masjedee; 4,017; 6.0%	Nira Dookeran; 642; 1.0%		Alex Perrier (CHP); 259 0.4%	David McGuinty
Ottawa South	David McGuinty; 43,388; 65.2%	Blair Turner; 18,010; 27.1%	Hena Masjedee; 4,017; 6.0%	Nira Dookeran; 642; 1.0%		John Redins (CFP); 93 0.1%	David McGuinty
Ottawa—Vanier—Gloucester	Mona Fortier; 45,934; 67.4%	Dean Wythe; 14,633; 21.5%	Tristan Oliff; 5,164; 7.6%	Christian Proulx; 1,345; 2.0%	Marty Simms; 349; 0.5%	Elizabeth Benoit (Ind.); 238 0.3%	Mona Fortier; Ottawa—Vanier
Ottawa—Vanier—Gloucester	Mona Fortier; 45,934; 67.4%	Dean Wythe; 14,633; 21.5%	Tristan Oliff; 5,164; 7.6%	Christian Proulx; 1,345; 2.0%	Marty Simms; 349; 0.5%	Coreen Corcoran (Libert.); 338 0.5%	Mona Fortier; Ottawa—Vanier
Ottawa—Vanier—Gloucester	Mona Fortier; 45,934; 67.4%	Dean Wythe; 14,633; 21.5%	Tristan Oliff; 5,164; 7.6%	Christian Proulx; 1,345; 2.0%	Marty Simms; 349; 0.5%	Christian Legeais (M-L); 182 0.3%	Mona Fortier; Ottawa—Vanier
Ottawa West—Nepean	Anita Vandenbeld; 43,555; 63.6%	Ryan Telford; 18,517; 27.1%	Josh Bizjak; 4,847; 7.1%	Prashanta Dhakal; 780; 1.1%	Glen Armstrong; 514; 0.8%	Sean Mulligan (CHP); 232; 0.3%	Anita Vandenbeld

Longest Ballot Committee (Note: Longest Ballot Committee candidates have Tomas Szuchewycz as their official agent. Affiliated candidates from registered political parties are listed normally.) All Independent unless noted: Sana Ahmad 41; Mélodie Anderson 16; Marthalee Aykroyd 9; Alex Banks 16; Tetia Bayoro 5; Sophie Bearden 14; Michael Bednarski 15; Line Bélanger 6; Jeani Boudreault (NA) 12; Alain Bourgault 8; John Boylan 17; Sarah Burke 27; Dante Camarena Jimenez 4; Jenny Cartwright 11; Jaël Champagne Gareau 4; David Cherniak 5; Charlie Currie 20; John Dale 20; Manon Marie Lili Desbiens (NA) 3; Gerrit Dogger 4; Ysack Dupont (NA) 0; Alexandra Engering 12; Scott Falkingham 45; Euan Fraser Tait 18; Maria Gabriel 10; Daniel Gagnon 8; Pierre Gauthier 38; Gregory Gillis 4; Jeffrey Goodman 11; Peter Gorman 7; Daniel Graham 2; Artem Gudkov 3; Zornitsa Halacheva 2; Anthony Hamel 2; Blake Hamilton 6; Robert Harris 8; Loren Hicks 6; Kerri Hildebrandt (NA) 3; Andrea Hollinger 8; Trevor Holsworth 3; Seyed Hosseini Lavasani 13; Ryan Huard 9; Demetrios Karavas 2; Laina Kohler (NA) 10; Kevin Krisa 5; Krzysztof Krzywinski (NA) 3; Dan Kyung 35; Samuel Lafontaine 3; Alain Lamontagne 5; Alexander Lein (NA) 6; Charles Lemieux 10; Connie Lukawski 8; Agnieszka Marszalek 6; Joseph Maw 1; Donald McKay 11; Mark Moutter 23; Christopher Navarro-Canseco (NA) 4; Winston Neutel 5; David Nguyen 15; Sheri Oberman 2; John Francis O'Flynn 8; Lény Painchaud 5; Lanna Palsson 4; Guillaume Paradis 37; Lajos Polya 12; Lorant Polya 57; Spencer Rocchi 4; Wallace Richard Rowat 2; Julian Selody 7; Hakim Sheriff 6; Roger Sherwood 3; Yogo Shimada 3; Michael Skirzynski 3; Julie St-Amand 3; Pascal St-Amand 2; Patrick Strzalkowski 4; Daniel Stuckless 11; Benjamin Teichman 2; Sarah Thompson 9; Darcy Vanderwater (NA) 12; Elliot Wand 5; Michal Wieczorek 7; David Zhu 21

=== Eastern Ontario ===
Electoral district	Candidates					Incumbent
Electoral district	Liberal	Conservative	NDP	Green	Other	Incumbent
Algonquin—Renfrew—Pembroke	Cyndi Mills; 25,338; 37.8%	Cheryl Gallant; 37,333; 55.7%	Eileen Jones-Whyte; 2,469; 3.7%	Danilo Velasquez; 618; 0.9%	Randy Briand (UP); 909 1.4%	Cheryl Gallant; Renfrew—Nipissing—Pembroke
Algonquin—Renfrew—Pembroke	Cyndi Mills; 25,338; 37.8%	Cheryl Gallant; 37,333; 55.7%	Eileen Jones-Whyte; 2,469; 3.7%	Danilo Velasquez; 618; 0.9%	Stefan Klietsch (Ind.); 122 0.2%	Cheryl Gallant; Renfrew—Nipissing—Pembroke
Algonquin—Renfrew—Pembroke	Cyndi Mills; 25,338; 37.8%	Cheryl Gallant; 37,333; 55.7%	Eileen Jones-Whyte; 2,469; 3.7%	Danilo Velasquez; 618; 0.9%	Seth Malina (Ind.); 229 0.3%	Cheryl Gallant; Renfrew—Nipissing—Pembroke
Bay of Quinte	Chris Malette; 32,846; 50.4%	Ryan Williams; 29,130; 44.7%	Kate Crothers; 2,373; 3.6%	Erica Charlton; 833; 1.3%		Ryan Williams
Hastings—Lennox and Addington—Tyendinaga	Tracey Sweeney Schenk; 26,745; 40.4%	Shelby Kramp-Neuman; 36,005; 54.3%	Ava Duffy; 2,351; 3.5%	Michael Holbrook; 803; 1.2%	Zaid Yusufani (PPC); 377; 0.6%	Shelby Kramp-Neuman; Hastings—Lennox and Addington
Kingston and the Islands	Mark Gerretsen; 48,682; 63.2%	Bryan Paterson; 23,592; 30.6%	Daria Juüdi-Hope; 3,648; 4.7%	Fintan Hartnett; 1,071; 1.4%		Mark Gerretsen
Lanark—Frontenac	Michelle Foxton; 30,900; 45.6%	Scott Reid; 34,186; 50.4%	Danielle Rae; 1,986; 2.9%	Jesse Pauley; 741; 1.1%		Scott Reid; Lanark—Frontenac—Kingston
Leeds—Grenville—Thousand Islands—Rideau Lakes	Lorna Jean Edmonds; 29,656; 44.4%	Michael Barrett; 33,437; 50.0%	Paul Lancione; 2,341; 3.5%	Randi Ramdeen; 781; 1.2%	Hailey Simpson (PPC); 596; 0.9%	Michael Barrett; Leeds—Grenville—Thousand Islands and Rideau Lakes
Prescott—Russell—Cumberland	Giovanna Mingarelli; 39,110; 54.8%	Julie Séguin; 28,805; 40.3%	Ryder Finlay; 1,730; 2.4%	Thaila Riden; 787; 1.1%	Deborah Perrier (PPC); 725 1.0%	Francis Drouin†; Glengarry—Prescott—Russell
Prescott—Russell—Cumberland	Giovanna Mingarelli; 39,110; 54.8%	Julie Séguin; 28,805; 40.3%	Ryder Finlay; 1,730; 2.4%	Thaila Riden; 787; 1.1%	Jason St-Louis (Ind.); 236 0.3%	Francis Drouin†; Glengarry—Prescott—Russell
Stormont—Dundas—Glengarry	Sarah Good; 26,407; 39.8%	Eric Duncan; 37,399; 56.3%	Mario Leclerc; 1,653; 2.5%	Gordon Kubanek; 674; 1.0%	Karl Ivan MacKinnon (Libert.); 274; 0.4%	Eric Duncan; Stormont—Dundas—South Glengarry

=== Central Ontario ===
Electoral district	Candidates						Incumbent
Electoral district	Liberal	Conservative	NDP	Green	PPC	Other	Incumbent
Barrie South—Innisfil	John Olthuis; 25,557; 38.0%	John Brassard; 38,943; 57.8%	Andrew Harrigan; 2,130; 3.2%		Mark Sampson; 695; 1.0%		John Brassard; Barrie—Innisfil
Barrie—Springwater—Oro-Medonte	Rose Zacharias; 29,150; 44.4%	Doug Shipley; 33,949; 51.7%	Gabriela Trujillo; 1,559; 2.4%	Greg Taylor; 893; 1.4%		Michael Speers (Comm.); 158; 0.2%	Doug Shipley
Bruce—Grey—Owen Sound	Anne Marie Watson; 26,837; 40.1%	Alex Ruff; 35,484; 53.0%	Christopher Neudorf; 2,069; 3.1%	Natasha Akiwenzie; 1,447; 2.2%	Pavel Smolko; 520; 0.8%	Ann Gillies (UP); 554; 0.8%	Alex Ruff
Dufferin—Caledon	Malalai Halimi; 24,818; 35.2%	Kyle Seeback; 42,458; 60.1%	Viktor Karklins; 1,380; 2.0%	Ifra Baig; 927; 1.3%	Dympna Carolan; 752; 1.1%	Jeffrey Halsall (Ind.); 260; 0.4%	Kyle Seeback
Haliburton—Kawartha Lakes	Nell Thomas; 29,223; 38.7%	Jamie Schmale; 42,701; 56.6%	Alyea Teel; 2,625; 3.5%		Michael Penman; 954; 1.3%		Jamie Schmale; Haliburton—Kawartha Lakes—Brock
New Tecumseth—Gwillimbury	Mike Hanrahan; 24,444; 37.0%	Scot Davidson; 39,247; 59.4%	Nancy Morrison; 1,226; 1.9%	Callum McKinnon; 712; 1.1%	Paul Montague; 496; 0.8%		Scot Davidson; York—Simcoe
Northumberland—Clarke	John Goheen; 32,648; 45.9%	Philip Lawrence; 34,862; 49.0%	Ava Becker; 2,090; 2.9%	Christina Marie Wilson; 630; 0.9%	Lisa Bradburn; 521; 0.7%	Jody Ledgerwood (Ind.); 270 0.4%	Philip Lawrence; Northumberland—Peterborough South
Northumberland—Clarke	John Goheen; 32,648; 45.9%	Philip Lawrence; 34,862; 49.0%	Ava Becker; 2,090; 2.9%	Christina Marie Wilson; 630; 0.9%	Lisa Bradburn; 521; 0.7%	John Wesselius (CHP); 171 0.2%	Philip Lawrence; Northumberland—Peterborough South
Peterborough	Emma Harrison; 42,890; 54.3%	Michelle Ferreri; 32,446; 41.0%	Heather Ray; 2,406; 3.0%	Jazmine Raine; 655; 0.8%	Jami-Leigh McMaster; 272; 0.3%	Matthew Grove (CHP); 168 0.2%	Michelle Ferreri; Peterborough—Kawartha
Peterborough	Emma Harrison; 42,890; 54.3%	Michelle Ferreri; 32,446; 41.0%	Heather Ray; 2,406; 3.0%	Jazmine Raine; 655; 0.8%	Jami-Leigh McMaster; 272; 0.3%	Chad Jewell (Ind.); 222 0.3%	Michelle Ferreri; Peterborough—Kawartha
Simcoe—Grey	Bren Munro; 29,455; 43.4%	Terry Dowdall; 35,364; 52.1%	Jasleen Bains; 1,574; 2.3%	Allan Kuhn; 991; 1.5%	Giorgio Mammoliti; 523; 0.8%		Terry Dowdall
Simcoe North	Ryan Rocca; 29,767; 44.7%	Adam Chambers; 32,241; 48.4%	Melissa Lloyd; 2,508; 3.8%	Ray Little; 1,260; 1.9%	Stephen Toivo Makk; 638; 1.0%	Russ Emo (CHP); 191; 0.3%	Adam Chambers

=== Southern Durham ===
Electoral district	Candidates						Incumbent
Electoral district	Liberal	Conservative	NDP	Green	Centrist	Other	Incumbent
Ajax	Jennifer McKelvie; 36,975; 56.3%	Greg Brady; 25,658; 39.1%	Kyle Forster; 1,762; 2.7%	Leigh Paulseth; 612; 0.9%	Faisal Ali; 643; 1.0%		Mark Holland^{$}
Bowmanville—Oshawa North	Bridget Girard; 32,214; 45.5%	Jamil Jivani; 35,232; 49.8%	Elenor Marano; 2,032; 2.9%	Julie Dietrich; 546; 0.8%	Ghuzna Imam; 134; 0.2%	Clint Cole (UP); 143 0.2%	Jamil Jivani; Durham
Bowmanville—Oshawa North	Bridget Girard; 32,214; 45.5%	Jamil Jivani; 35,232; 49.8%	Elenor Marano; 2,032; 2.9%	Julie Dietrich; 546; 0.8%	Ghuzna Imam; 134; 0.2%	Pranay Gunti (Ind.); 264 0.4%	Jamil Jivani; Durham
Bowmanville—Oshawa North	Bridget Girard; 32,214; 45.5%	Jamil Jivani; 35,232; 49.8%	Elenor Marano; 2,032; 2.9%	Julie Dietrich; 546; 0.8%	Ghuzna Imam; 134; 0.2%	Adam Smith (Rhino.); 68 0.1%	Jamil Jivani; Durham
Bowmanville—Oshawa North	Bridget Girard; 32,214; 45.5%	Jamil Jivani; 35,232; 49.8%	Elenor Marano; 2,032; 2.9%	Julie Dietrich; 546; 0.8%	Ghuzna Imam; 134; 0.2%	Thomas Zekveld (CHP); 155 0.2%	Jamil Jivani; Durham
Oshawa	Isaac Ransom; 28,653; 43.0%	Rhonda Kirkland; 32,131; 48.2%	Sara Labelle; 5,112; 7.7%	Katherine Mathewson; 804; 1.2%			Colin Carrie†
Pickering—Brooklin	Juanita Nathan; 38,578; 54.2%	Alicia Vianga; 29,320; 41.2%	Jamie Nye; 1,838; 2.6%	Andrea Wood; 535; 0.8%	Zainab Rana; 322; 0.5%	Lisa Robinson (PPC); 639; 0.9%	Jennifer O'Connell^{$} Pickering—Uxbridge
Whitby	Ryan Turnbull; 35,624; 52.7%	Steve Yamada; 29,620; 43.8%	Kevin Goswell; 1,638; 2.4%	Andrew Di Lullo; 506; 0.7%	Nouman Mian; 206; 0.3%		Ryan Turnbull

=== York Region ===
Electoral district	Candidates						Incumbent
Electoral district	Liberal	Conservative	NDP	Green	PPC	Other	Incumbent
Aurora—Oak Ridges—Richmond Hill	Leah Taylor Roy; 26,590; 42.8%	Costas Menegakis; 34,023; 54.7%	Danielle Maniuk; 835; 1.3%	Tom Muench; 465; 0.7%	Igor Tvorogov; 256; 0.4%		Leah Taylor Roy
King—Vaughan	Mubarak Ahmed; 24,352; 35.9%	Anna Roberts; 41,682; 61.5%	Samantha Sanchez; 769; 1.1%	Ann Raney; 576; 0.9%	Vageesh Sabharwal; 368; 0.5%		Anna Roberts
Markham—Stouffville	Helena Jaczek; 31,658; 51.4%	Niran Jeyanesan; 27,898; 45.3%	Serena Cheung; 1,121; 1.8%	Myles O'Brien; 433; 0.7%	René de Vries; 393; 0.6%	Shahzad Ahmed (Cent.); 141; 0.2%	Helena Jaczek^{¢}
Markham—Thornhill	Tim Hodgson; 27,504; 54.5%	Lionel Loganathan; 21,003; 41.6%	Aftab Qureshi; 1,022; 2.0%		Mimi Lee; 747; 1.5%	Haider Qureshi (Cent.); 153; 0.3%	Mary Ng^{$}
Markham—Unionville	Peter Yuen; 25,133; 47.1%	Michael Ma; 27,055; 50.7%	Sameer Qureshi; 723; 1.4%	Elvin Kao; 503; 0.9%			Paul Chiang^{$}
Newmarket—Aurora	Jennifer McLachlan; 29,299; 47.0%	Sandra Cobena; 31,540; 50.6%	Anna Gollen; 1,473; 2.4%				Tony Van Bynen†
Richmond Hill South	Majid Jowhari; 26,009; 44.4%	Vincent Ho; 30,615; 52.3%	Ebrahim Astaraki; 1,054; 1.8%	Alison Lam; 495; 0.8%	Joshua Sideris; 244; 0.4%	Yan Wang (Ind.); 124 0.2%	Majid Jowhari; Richmond Hill
Richmond Hill South	Majid Jowhari; 26,009; 44.4%	Vincent Ho; 30,615; 52.3%	Ebrahim Astaraki; 1,054; 1.8%	Alison Lam; 495; 0.8%	Joshua Sideris; 244; 0.4%	Juni Yeung (CFP); 43 0.1%	Majid Jowhari; Richmond Hill
Thornhill	Liane Kotler; 20,873; 31.2%	Melissa Lantsman; 44,419; 66.4%	William McCarty; 833; 1.2%	Dominic Piotrowski; 353; 0.5%	Amir Hart; 440; 0.7%		Melissa Lantsman
Vaughan—Woodbridge	Francesco Sorbara; 25,617; 38.0%	Michael Guglielmin; 40,422; 60.0%	Ali Bahman; 891; 1.3%		Roman Yevseyev; 425; 0.6%		Francesco Sorbara
York—Durham	Robert Grossi; 28,726; 39.6%	Jacob Mantle; 40,329; 55.6%	Justin Graham; 1,829; 2.5%	Matt Pearce; 797; 1.1%	Patricia Conlin; 901; 1.2%		New District

=== Scarborough ===
Electoral district	Candidates					Incumbent
Electoral district	Liberal	Conservative	NDP	Green	Other	Incumbent
Scarborough—Agincourt	Jean Yip; 27,552; 54.3%	Aris Movsessian; 21,732; 42.8%	Dan Lovell; 1,449; 2.9%			Jean Yip
Scarborough Centre—Don Valley East	Salma Zahid; 27,557; 57.3%	Belent Mathew; 18,307; 38.1%	Alyson Koa; 1,565; 3.3%		Peter Koubakis (PPC); 659; 1.4%	Michael Coteau‡ Don Valley East (Running in Scarborough—Woburn)
Scarborough Centre—Don Valley East	Salma Zahid; 27,557; 57.3%	Belent Mathew; 18,307; 38.1%	Alyson Koa; 1,565; 3.3%		Peter Koubakis (PPC); 659; 1.4%	Merged District
Scarborough Centre—Don Valley East	Salma Zahid; 27,557; 57.3%	Belent Mathew; 18,307; 38.1%	Alyson Koa; 1,565; 3.3%		Peter Koubakis (PPC); 659; 1.4%	Salma Zahid; Scarborough Centre
Scarborough—Guildwood—Rouge Park	Gary Anandasangaree; 35,295; 64.0%	Suchita Jalan; 17,485; 31.7%	Kingsley Kwok; 1,772; 3.2%	Troy Rife; 633; 1.1%		Gary Anandasangaree; Scarborough—Rouge Park
Scarborough North	Shaun Chen; 29,418; 63.0%	Gurmit Sandhu; 15,487; 33.1%	Karishma Manji; 1,827; 3.9%			Shaun Chen
Scarborough Southwest	Bill Blair; 33,495; 61.5%	Asm Tarun; 16,652; 30.6%	Fatima Shaban; 2,730; 5.0%	Amanda Cain; 754; 1.4%	Imran Khan (Cent.); 165 0.3%	Bill Blair
Scarborough Southwest	Bill Blair; 33,495; 61.5%	Asm Tarun; 16,652; 30.6%	Fatima Shaban; 2,730; 5.0%	Amanda Cain; 754; 1.4%	Christine Nugent (M-L); 113 0.2%	Bill Blair
Scarborough Southwest	Bill Blair; 33,495; 61.5%	Asm Tarun; 16,652; 30.6%	Fatima Shaban; 2,730; 5.0%	Amanda Cain; 754; 1.4%	Michael Poulin (PPC); 567 1.0%	Bill Blair
Scarborough—Woburn	Michael Coteau; 25,281; 60.4%	Reddy Muttukuru; 14,291; 34.1%	George Wedge; 1,466; 3.5%	Gianne Broughton; 499; 1.2%	Amina Bhaiyat (Ind.); 181 0.4%	John McKay†; Scarborough—Guildwood
Scarborough—Woburn	Michael Coteau; 25,281; 60.4%	Reddy Muttukuru; 14,291; 34.1%	George Wedge; 1,466; 3.5%	Gianne Broughton; 499; 1.2%	Ayub Sipra (Cent.); 150 0.4%	John McKay†; Scarborough—Guildwood

=== North York ===
Electoral district	Candidates					Incumbent
Electoral district	Liberal	Conservative	NDP	Green	Other	Incumbent
Don Valley North	Maggie Chi; 25,822; 53.2%	Joe Tay; 20,546; 42.3%	Naila Saeed; 1,191; 2.5%	Andrew Armstrong; 448; 0.9%	Xiaohua Gong (NA); 260 0.5%	Han Dong†
Don Valley North	Maggie Chi; 25,822; 53.2%	Joe Tay; 20,546; 42.3%	Naila Saeed; 1,191; 2.5%	Andrew Armstrong; 448; 0.9%	Ivan Milivojevic (PPC); 260 0.5%	Han Dong†
Don Valley West	Rob Oliphant; 36,744; 62.6%	Robert Pierce; 19,480; 33.2%	Linnea Löfström-Abary; 1,382; 2.4%	Sheena Sharp; 616; 1.1%	Bahira Abdulsalam (Ind.); 442; 0.8%	Rob Oliphant
Eglinton—Lawrence	Vince Gasparro; 29,949; 49.3%	Karen Stintz; 29,061; 47.8%	Allison Tanzola; 996; 1.6%	Wayne Chechuevskiy; 429; 0.7%	Timothy Gleeson (PPC); 326; 0.5%	Vacant (Note: There was no byelection because the riding became vacant within nine months of the scheduled date of a general election.)
Willowdale	Ali Ehsassi; 25,488; 53.4%	James Lin; 20,977; 44.0%	Christy Kheirallah; 1,224; 2.6%			Ali Ehsassi
York Centre	Ya'ara Saks; 20,318; 42.7%	Roman Baber; 26,110; 54.8%	Yusuf Ulukanligil; 1,191; 2.5%			Ya'ara Saks

=== Central Toronto and East York ===
Electoral district	Candidates							Incumbent
Electoral district	Liberal	Conservative	NDP	Green	Marxist-Leninist	Communist	Other	Incumbent
Beaches—East York	Nate Erskine-Smith; 39,804; 67.7%	Jocelyne Poirier; 13,830; 23.5%	Shannon Devine; 4,027; 6.9%	Jack Pennings; 748; 1.3%	Steve Rutchinski; 39; 0.1%	Elizabeth Rowley; 146; 0.2%	Diane Joseph (Ind.); 161; 0.3%	Nathaniel Erskine-Smith^{¢}
Davenport	Julie Dzerowicz; 35,364; 57.8%	Francis Lavoie; 14,189; 23.2%	Sandra Sousa; 10,452; 17.1%	Lilian Barrera; 782; 1.3%		Dave McKee; 387; 0.6%		Julie Dzerowicz
Spadina—Harbourfront	Chi Nguyen; 31,832; 60.1%	Diana Filipova; 16,286; 30.7%	Norm Di Pasquale; 4,107; 7.8%	Gordon Rand; 448; 0.8%	Nick Lin; 85; 0.2%		Gilbert Joseph Jubinville (PPC); 193 0.4%	Kevin Vuong†; Spadina—Fort York
Spadina—Harbourfront	Chi Nguyen; 31,832; 60.1%	Diana Filipova; 16,286; 30.7%	Norm Di Pasquale; 4,107; 7.8%	Gordon Rand; 448; 0.8%	Nick Lin; 85; 0.2%		Shrey Rao (Ind.); 39 0.1%	Kevin Vuong†; Spadina—Fort York
Taiaiako'n—Parkdale—High Park	Karim Bardeesy; 36,439; 55.8%	Wladyslaw Lizon; 12,662; 19.4%	Bhutila Karpoche; 15,003; 23.0%	Anna Gorka; 700; 1.1%	Lorne Gershuny; 92; 0.1%	Rimmy Riarh; 137; 0.2%	Edward Fraser (APP); 184 0.3%	Arif Virani^{$} Parkdale—High Park
Taiaiako'n—Parkdale—High Park	Karim Bardeesy; 36,439; 55.8%	Wladyslaw Lizon; 12,662; 19.4%	Bhutila Karpoche; 15,003; 23.0%	Anna Gorka; 700; 1.1%	Lorne Gershuny; 92; 0.1%	Rimmy Riarh; 137; 0.2%	Terry Parker (Mar.); 96 0.1%	Arif Virani^{$} Parkdale—High Park
Toronto Centre	Evan Solomon; 37,907; 64.3%	Luis Ibarra; 12,321; 20.9%	Samantha Green; 7,358; 12.5%	Olivia Iheme; 664; 1.1%	Philip Fernandez; 170; 0.3%		Simon Luisi (APP); 177 0.3%	Marci Ien^{$}
Toronto Centre	Evan Solomon; 37,907; 64.3%	Luis Ibarra; 12,321; 20.9%	Samantha Green; 7,358; 12.5%	Olivia Iheme; 664; 1.1%	Philip Fernandez; 170; 0.3%		Cleveland Marshall (Ind.); 90 0.2%	Marci Ien^{$}
Toronto Centre	Evan Solomon; 37,907; 64.3%	Luis Ibarra; 12,321; 20.9%	Samantha Green; 7,358; 12.5%	Olivia Iheme; 664; 1.1%	Philip Fernandez; 170; 0.3%		Nathen Mazri (PPC); 235 0.4%	Marci Ien^{$}
Toronto—Danforth	Julie Dabrusin; 39,191; 66.6%	Ashik Hussain; 11,187; 19.0%	Clare Hacksel; 7,626; 13.0%	Silvia Stardust; 626; 1.1%			Liz White (APP); 251; 0.4%	Julie Dabrusin
Toronto—St. Paul's	Leslie Church; 44,313; 61.9%	Don Stewart; 23,700; 33.1%	Bruce Levy; 2,496; 3.5%	Shane Philips; 552; 0.8%	David Gershuny; 133; 0.2%		Joseph Frasca (PPC); 329 0.5%	Don Stewart
Toronto—St. Paul's	Leslie Church; 44,313; 61.9%	Don Stewart; 23,700; 33.1%	Bruce Levy; 2,496; 3.5%	Shane Philips; 552; 0.8%	David Gershuny; 133; 0.2%		Cynthia Valdron (CFP); 58 0.1%	Don Stewart
University—Rosedale	Chrystia Freeland; 39,847; 64.0%	Liz Grade; 14,624; 23.5%	Serena Purdy; 6,168; 9.9%	Ignacio Mongrell; 1,066; 1.7%	Barbara Biley; 138; 0.2%	Drew Garvie; 304; 0.5%	Adam Golding (Ind.); 118; 0.2%	Chrystia Freeland

=== Etobicoke and York ===
Electoral district	Candidates						Incumbent
Electoral district	Liberal	Conservative	NDP	Green	PPC	Other	Incumbent
Etobicoke Centre	Yvan Baker; 36,186; 53.6%	Ted Opitz; 29,713; 44.0%	Ji Won Jung; 1,611; 2.4%				Yvan Baker
Etobicoke—Lakeshore	James Maloney; 37,512; 57.4%	Bernard Trottier; 25,348; 38.8%	Cory Wagar; 1,665; 2.5%		Thomas Fanjoy; 616; 0.9%	Janice Murray (M-L); 197; 0.3%	James Maloney
Etobicoke North	John Zerucelli; 22,270; 52.6%	Natalie Weed; 17,359; 41.0%	Benjamin Abis; 1,354; 3.2%	Sarun Balaranjan; 394; 0.9%	Andy D'Andrea; 846; 2.0%	Neil Simon (Ind.); 132; 0.3%	Kirsty Duncan^{$}
Humber River—Black Creek	Judy Sgro; 21,357; 55.6%	Bijay Paudel; 13,745; 35.8%	Matias de Dovitiis; 2,449; 6.4%		Marek Jasinski; 621; 1.6%	Jeanne McGuire (Comm.); 226; 0.6%	Judy Sgro
York South—Weston—Etobicoke	Ahmed Hussen; 24,663; 55.3%	Nicolas Pham; 17,746; 39.8%	Louise James; 2,190; 4.9%				Ahmed Hussen; York South—Weston

=== Brampton ===
Electoral district	Candidates							Incumbent
Electoral district	Liberal	Conservative	NDP	Green	PPC	Centrist	Independent	Incumbent
Brampton Centre	Amandeep Sodhi; 19,716; 48.4%	Taran Chahal; 19,105; 46.9%	Anil Boodhai; 1,085; 2.7%	Ray Shaver; 469; 1.2%	Harsimran Kaur Hundal; 288; 0.7%	Taha Nazir; 97; 0.2%		Shafqat Ali‡ (Running in Brampton—Chinguacousy Park)
Brampton—Chinguacousy Park	Shafqat Ali; 21,532; 48.8%	Tim Iqbal; 19,591; 44.4%	Teresa Yeh; 1,173; 2.7%	Mike Dancy; 521; 1.2%	Jayesh Brahmbhatt; 741; 1.7%	Hafiz Muneeb Ahmad; 194; 0.4%	Avi Dhaliwal; 328; 0.7%	New District
Brampton East	Maninder Sidhu; 23,616; 48.6%	Bob Dosanjh Singh; 21,731; 44.7%	Haramrit Singh; 821; 1.7%		Jeff Lal; 2,305; 4.7%	Abdus S Kissana; 132; 0.3%		Maninder Sidhu
Brampton North—Caledon	Ruby Sahota; 22,847; 49.0%	Amandeep Judge; 22,105; 47.4%	Ruby Zaman; 1,008; 2.2%		Sat Anand; 635; 1.4%			Ruby Sahota; Brampton North
Brampton South	Sonia Sidhu; 22,001; 49.3%	Sukhdeep Kang; 21,193; 47.5%	Rajni Sharma; 777; 1.7%		Vijay Kumar; 358; 0.8%		Manmohan Khroud; 274; 0.6%	Sonia Sidhu
Brampton West	Kamal Khera; 20,194; 47.6%	Amarjeet Gill; 21,112; 49.8%	Zaigham Javed; 708; 1.7%	Sameera Khan; 278; 0.7%		Khawaja Amir Hassan; 95; 0.2%		Kamal Khera

=== Mississauga ===
Electoral district	Candidates							Incumbent
Electoral district	Liberal	Conservative	NDP	Green	PPC	Independent	Marxist-Leninist	Incumbent
Mississauga Centre	Fares Al Soud; 29,605; 53.9%	Muhammad Ishaq; 23,010; 41.9%	Brandon Nguyen; 1,502; 2.7%		Gurdeep Wolosz; 602; 1.1%	Zulfiqar Ali; 257; 0.5%		Omar Alghabra†
Mississauga East—Cooksville	Peter Fonseca; 27,138; 50.2%	Nita Kang; 24,112; 44.6%	Khawar Hussain; 1,508; 2.8%		Amit Gupta; 964; 1.8%	Winston Harding; 221; 0.4%	Dagmar Sullivan; 113; 0.2%	Peter Fonseca
Mississauga—Erin Mills	Iqra Khalid; 33,448; 55.7%	Milad Mikael; 24,000; 40.0%	Ehab Mustapha; 1,311; 2.2%	Sulaiman Khan; 367; 0.6%	Michael Bayer; 734; 1.2%	Michael Matulewicz; 179; 0.3%		Iqra Khalid
Mississauga—Lakeshore	Charles Sousa; 34,971; 52.4%	Tom Ellard; 29,416; 44.0%	Evelyn Butler; 1,254; 1.9%	Mary Kidnew; 587; 0.9%	Fahad Rao; 334; 0.5%	Carlton Darby; 122; 0.2%	Anna Di Carlo; 113; 0.2%	Charles Sousa
Mississauga—Malton	Iqwinder Singh Gaheer; 26,793; 53.3%	Jaspreet Sandhu; 21,202; 42.2%	Inderjeetsingh Ailsinghani; 1,290; 2.6%		Nathan Quinlan; 983; 2.0%			Iqwinder Gaheer
Mississauga—Streetsville	Rechie Valdez; 31,297; 51.5%	Sue McFadden; 27,241; 44.9%	Bushra Asghar; 1,388; 2.3%	Chris Hill; 439; 0.7%	Logan Araujo; 366; 0.6%			Rechie Valdez

=== Halton ===
Electoral district	Candidates						Incumbent
Electoral district	Liberal	Conservative	NDP	Green	PPC	Other	Incumbent
Burlington	Karina Gould; 43,593; 55.8%	Emily Brown; 31,686; 40.6%	Michael Beauchemin; 1,549; 2.0%	Kyle Hutton; 595; 0.8%	Michael Bator; 523; 0.7%	Paul Harper (Rhino.); 75 0.1%	Karina Gould
Burlington	Karina Gould; 43,593; 55.8%	Emily Brown; 31,686; 40.6%	Michael Beauchemin; 1,549; 2.0%	Kyle Hutton; 595; 0.8%	Michael Bator; 523; 0.7%	Ocean Marshall (Libert.); 105 0.1%	Karina Gould
Burlington North—Milton West	Adam Van Koeverden; 37,155; 52.7%	Nadeem Akbar; 31,172; 44.3%	Naveed Ahmed; 1,507; 2.1%		Charles Zach; 607; 0.9%		Adam van Koeverden; Milton
Milton East—Halton Hills South (judicially certified)	Kristina Tesser Derksen; 32,178; 48.3%	Parm Gill; 32,157; 48.2%	Muhammad Riaz Sahi; 1,029; 1.5%	Susan Doyle; 672; 1.0%	Walter J. Hofman; 475; 0.7%	Shahbaz Mahmood Khan (Ind.); 174; 0.3%	New District
Oakville East	Anita Anand; 31,128; 51.1%	Ron Chhinzer; 27,301; 44.8%	Hailey Ford; 1,698; 2.8%	Bruno Sousa; 351; 0.6%	Henry Karabela; 335; 0.6%	Alicia Bedford (UP); 59; 0.1%	Anita Anand^{¢} Oakville
Oakville West	Sima Acan; 31,872; 53.1%	Tim Crowder; 26,668; 44.4%	Diane Downey; 831; 1.4%	Chris Kowalchuk; 363; 0.6%	JD Meaney; 254; 0.4%	Martin Gegus (Ind.); 55; 0.1%	Pam Damoff†; Oakville North—Burlington

=== Hamilton and Niagara ===
Electoral district	Candidates						Incumbent
Electoral district	Liberal	Conservative	NDP	Green	PPC	Other	Incumbent
Flamborough—Glanbrook—Brant North	Chuck Phillips; 28,915; 43.2%	Dan Muys; 35,246; 52.7%	Peter Werhun; 1,630; 2.4%	Anita Payne; 594; 0.9%	Nikita Mahood; 499; 0.7%		Dan Muys; Flamborough—Glanbrook
Hamilton Centre	Aslam Rana; 21,388; 37.6%	Hayden Lawrence; 17,079; 30.0%	Matthew Green; 16,581; 29.1%	Sandy Crawley; 818; 1.4%	David Speicher; 591; 1.0%	Cody Chenier (Rhino.); 190 0.3%	Matthew Green
Hamilton Centre	Aslam Rana; 21,388; 37.6%	Hayden Lawrence; 17,079; 30.0%	Matthew Green; 16,581; 29.1%	Sandy Crawley; 818; 1.4%	David Speicher; 591; 1.0%	Carla Green (NA); 215 0.4%	Matthew Green
Hamilton Centre	Aslam Rana; 21,388; 37.6%	Hayden Lawrence; 17,079; 30.0%	Matthew Green; 16,581; 29.1%	Sandy Crawley; 818; 1.4%	David Speicher; 591; 1.0%	Michael Loomans (NA); 90 0.2%	Matthew Green
Hamilton East—Stoney Creek	Chad Collins; 31,378; 46.5%	Ned Kuruc; 32,857; 48.7%	Nayla Mithani; 2,471; 3.7%		Jim Boutsikakis; 762; 1.1%		Chad Collins
Hamilton Mountain	Lisa Hepfner; 27,302; 45.6%	Ken Hewitt; 24,857; 41.5%	Monique Taylor; 7,044; 11.8%		Bing Wong; 497; 0.8%	Rolf Gerstenberger (M-L); 193; 0.3%	Lisa Hepfner
Hamilton West—Ancaster—Dundas	John-Paul Danko; 38,970; 56.1%	Erika Alexander; 25,547; 36.8%	Roberto Henriquez; 3,648; 5.3%	Georgia Beauchemin; 829; 1.2%	Ava Sharavi; 307; 0.4%	Jim Enos (CHP); 163; 0.2%	Filomena Tassi^{$}
Niagara Falls—Niagara-on-the-Lake	Andrea Kaiser; 27,199; 44.9%	Tony Baldinelli; 29,774; 49.1%	Shannon Mitchell; 2,335; 3.9%	Celia Taylor; 518; 0.9%	Dinah Althorpe; 481; 0.8%	Yawar Anwar (Cent.); 128 0.2%	Tony Baldinelli; Niagara Falls
Niagara Falls—Niagara-on-the-Lake	Andrea Kaiser; 27,199; 44.9%	Tony Baldinelli; 29,774; 49.1%	Shannon Mitchell; 2,335; 3.9%	Celia Taylor; 518; 0.9%	Dinah Althorpe; 481; 0.8%	Daniel Shakhmundes (Libert.); 160 0.3%	Tony Baldinelli; Niagara Falls
Niagara South	Vance Badawey; 33,708; 43.9%	Fred Davies; 36,702; 47.8%	Chantal McCollum; 4,307; 5.6%	Natashia Bergen; 683; 0.9%	Peter Taras; 1,147; 1.5%	David Vedova (CHP); 216; 0.3%	Vance Badawey; Niagara Centre
Niagara West	Jennifer Korstanje; 30,424; 43.2%	Dean Allison; 36,418; 51.7%	Justin Abando; 2,262; 3.2%		Ryan Anderson; 582; 0.8%	Dave Bylsma (CHP); 727; 1.0%	Dean Allison
St. Catharines	Chris Bittle; 34,750; 52.0%	Bas Sluijmers; 27,013; 40.4%	Karen Orlandi; 4,021; 6.0%		Dennis Wilson; 522; 0.8%	Taha Alexander Haj-Ahmad (Cent.); 198 0.3%	Chris Bittle
St. Catharines	Chris Bittle; 34,750; 52.0%	Bas Sluijmers; 27,013; 40.4%	Karen Orlandi; 4,021; 6.0%		Dennis Wilson; 522; 0.8%	Christopher Reilly (Ind.); 306 0.5%	Chris Bittle

=== Midwestern Ontario ===
Electoral district	Candidates						Incumbent
Electoral district	Liberal	Conservative	NDP	Green	PPC	Other	Incumbent
Brantford—Brant South—Six Nations	Joy O'Donnell; 27,032; 41.1%	Larry Brock; 34,501; 52.4%	Anne Gajerski-Cauley; 2,410; 3.7%	Karleigh Csordas; 1,110; 1.7%	Nicholas Xenos; 392; 0.6%	Leslie Bory (Ind.); 120 0.2%	Larry Brock; Brantford—Brant
Brantford—Brant South—Six Nations	Joy O'Donnell; 27,032; 41.1%	Larry Brock; 34,501; 52.4%	Anne Gajerski-Cauley; 2,410; 3.7%	Karleigh Csordas; 1,110; 1.7%	Nicholas Xenos; 392; 0.6%	Mike Clancy (Ind.); 148 0.2%	Larry Brock; Brantford—Brant
Brantford—Brant South—Six Nations	Joy O'Donnell; 27,032; 41.1%	Larry Brock; 34,501; 52.4%	Anne Gajerski-Cauley; 2,410; 3.7%	Karleigh Csordas; 1,110; 1.7%	Nicholas Xenos; 392; 0.6%	Clo Marie (Ind.); 80 0.1%	Larry Brock; Brantford—Brant
Cambridge	Bryan May; 30,309; 46.3%	Connie Cody; 31,766; 48.6%	José de Lima; 2,183; 3.3%	Lux Burgess; 1,052; 1.6%		Manuel Couto (M-L); 109; 0.2%	Bryan May
Guelph	Dominique O'Rourke; 36,406; 54.7%	Gurvir Khaira; 20,470; 30.7%	Janice Folk-Dawson; 2,129; 3.2%	Anne-Marie Zajdlik; 6,779; 10.2%	Jeffrey Swackhammer; 498; 0.7%	Elaine Baetz (M-L); 132 0.2%	Lloyd Longfield†
Guelph	Dominique O'Rourke; 36,406; 54.7%	Gurvir Khaira; 20,470; 30.7%	Janice Folk-Dawson; 2,129; 3.2%	Anne-Marie Zajdlik; 6,779; 10.2%	Jeffrey Swackhammer; 498; 0.7%	Michael Wassilyn (Ind.); 117 0.2%	Lloyd Longfield†
Guelph	Dominique O'Rourke; 36,406; 54.7%	Gurvir Khaira; 20,470; 30.7%	Janice Folk-Dawson; 2,129; 3.2%	Anne-Marie Zajdlik; 6,779; 10.2%	Jeffrey Swackhammer; 498; 0.7%	Yurii Yavorskyi (CFP); 62 0.1%	Lloyd Longfield†
Haldimand—Norfolk	Colin Walsh; 26,040; 36.4%	Leslyn Lewis; 41,218; 57.6%	Shannon Horner-Shepherd; 2,412; 3.4%	Nathan Hawkins; 750; 1.0%	Henry Geissler; 657; 0.9%	Lily Eggink (CHP); 529; 0.7%	Leslyn Lewis
Huron—Bruce	James Rice; 28,936; 41.5%	Ben Lobb; 37,027; 53.2%	Melanie Burrett; 2,300; 3.3%	Gregory J McLean; 927; 1.3%		Caesar salad Pella (Ind.); 194 0.3%	Ben Lobb
Huron—Bruce	James Rice; 28,936; 41.5%	Ben Lobb; 37,027; 53.2%	Melanie Burrett; 2,300; 3.3%	Gregory J McLean; 927; 1.3%		Justin L Smith (Ind.); 273 0.4%	Ben Lobb
Kitchener Centre	Brian Adeba; 17,292; 29.3%	Kelly DeRidder; 20,234; 34.2%	Heather Zaleski; 1,157; 2.0%	Mike Morrice; 19,859; 33.6%	Wasai Rahimi; 334; 0.6%	Margaretha Dyck (UP); 97 0.2%	Mike Morrice
Kitchener Centre	Brian Adeba; 17,292; 29.3%	Kelly DeRidder; 20,234; 34.2%	Heather Zaleski; 1,157; 2.0%	Mike Morrice; 19,859; 33.6%	Wasai Rahimi; 334; 0.6%	Ellen Papenburg (APP); 111 0.2%	Mike Morrice
Kitchener—Conestoga	Tim Louis; 30,001; 48.3%	Doug Treleaven; 29,479; 47.5%	Maya Bozorgzad; 1,821; 2.9%		Kevin Dupuis; 786; 1.3%		Tim Louis
Kitchener South—Hespeler	Valerie Bradford; 27,945; 46.2%	Matt Strauss; 28,973; 47.9%	Lorne Bruce; 1,823; 3.0%	Ethan Russell; 1,208; 2.0%	Randall Williams; 386; 0.6%	Kathleen Dueck (UP); 96; 0.2%	Valerie Bradford
Oxford	David Hilderley; 27,311; 38.2%	Arpan Khanna; 38,191; 53.4%	Matthew Chambers; 3,046; 4.3%	Cheryle Baker; 897; 1.3%	Steven Beausoleil; 642; 0.9%	Melanie Van Brugge (UP); 152 0.2%	Arpan Khanna
Oxford	David Hilderley; 27,311; 38.2%	Arpan Khanna; 38,191; 53.4%	Matthew Chambers; 3,046; 4.3%	Cheryle Baker; 897; 1.3%	Steven Beausoleil; 642; 0.9%	Akshay Varun Raj Vardhan (Ind.); 109 0.2%	Arpan Khanna
Oxford	David Hilderley; 27,311; 38.2%	Arpan Khanna; 38,191; 53.4%	Matthew Chambers; 3,046; 4.3%	Cheryle Baker; 897; 1.3%	Steven Beausoleil; 642; 0.9%	Jacob Watson (CHP); 1,203 1.7%	Arpan Khanna
Perth—Wellington	David Mackey; 26,142; 40.8%	John Nater; 33,972; 53.0%	Kevin Kruchkywich; 2,909; 4.5%		Wayne Baker; 1,069; 1.7%		John Nater
Waterloo	Bardish Chagger; 37,579; 59.5%	Waseem Botros; 20,571; 32.6%	Héline Chow; 2,617; 4.1%	Simon Guthrie; 1,599; 2.5%	Douglas Ross; 348; 0.6%	Santa Claus Chatham (Rhino.); 119 0.2%	Bardish Chagger
Waterloo	Bardish Chagger; 37,579; 59.5%	Waseem Botros; 20,571; 32.6%	Héline Chow; 2,617; 4.1%	Simon Guthrie; 1,599; 2.5%	Douglas Ross; 348; 0.6%	Jamie Hari (Ind.); 76 0.1%	Bardish Chagger
Waterloo	Bardish Chagger; 37,579; 59.5%	Waseem Botros; 20,571; 32.6%	Héline Chow; 2,617; 4.1%	Simon Guthrie; 1,599; 2.5%	Douglas Ross; 348; 0.6%	Val Neekman (Ind.); 179 0.3%	Bardish Chagger
Waterloo	Bardish Chagger; 37,579; 59.5%	Waseem Botros; 20,571; 32.6%	Héline Chow; 2,617; 4.1%	Simon Guthrie; 1,599; 2.5%	Douglas Ross; 348; 0.6%	Hans Roach (Ind.); 105 0.2%	Bardish Chagger
Wellington—Halton Hills North	Sean Carscadden; 29,609; 44.4%	Michael Chong; 33,736; 50.6%	Andrew Bascombe; 1,346; 2.0%	Liam Stiles; 1,389; 2.1%	Syl Carle; 566; 0.8%		Michael Chong; Wellington—Halton Hills

=== Southwestern Ontario ===
Electoral district	Candidates						Incumbent
Electoral district	Liberal	Conservative	NDP	Green	PPC	Other	Incumbent
Chatham-Kent—Leamington	Keith Pickard; 25,978; 35.9%	Dave Epp; 41,612; 57.5%	Seamus McInnis Fleming; 2,943; 4.1%	James Plunkett; 757; 1.0%	Trevor Lee; 1,061; 1.5%		Dave Epp
Elgin—St. Thomas—London South	David Goodwin; 28,010; 43.1%	Andrew Lawton; 32,565; 50.1%	Paul Pighin; 3,118; 4.8%		Stephen Campbell; 1,256; 1.9%		Karen Vecchio^{$} Elgin—Middlesex—London
Essex	Chris Sutton; 29,389; 36.7%	Chris Lewis; 46,123; 57.5%	Lori Wightman; 3,826; 4.8%		Jason A. E. Henry; 843; 1.1%		Chris Lewis
London Centre	Peter Fragiskatos; 33,999; 56.7%	Stephen Gallant; 18,633; 31.1%	Dirka Prout; 5,790; 9.7%	Mary Ann Hodge; 878; 1.5%	David Annis; 523; 0.9%	Bruce Lamb (CFP); 100; 0.2%	Peter Fragiskatos; London North Centre
London—Fanshawe	Najam Naqvi; 17,863; 30.5%	Kurt Holman; 23,749; 40.6%	Lindsay Mathyssen; 16,135; 27.6%		Daniel Buta; 776; 1.3%		Lindsay Mathyssen
London West	Arielle Kayabaga; 35,309; 56.2%	Adam Benni; 23,239; 37.0%	Shinade Allder; 3,463; 5.5%	Jeff Vanderzwet; 427; 0.7%		Russell Benner (CFP); 185 0.3%	Arielle Kayabaga
London West	Arielle Kayabaga; 35,309; 56.2%	Adam Benni; 23,239; 37.0%	Shinade Allder; 3,463; 5.5%	Jeff Vanderzwet; 427; 0.7%		Christine Oliver (UP); 185 0.3%	Arielle Kayabaga
Middlesex—London	Kent Keenan; 29,400; 42.1%	Lianne Rood; 36,093; 51.7%	Taylor McIntosh; 2,888; 4.1%	Jim Johnston; 698; 1.0%	Cynthia Workman; 577; 0.8%	Shawn Cartlidge (UP); 191; 0.3%	Lianne Rood; Lambton—Kent—Middlesex
Sarnia—Lambton—Bkejwanong	George Vandenberg; 28,940; 37.9%	Marilyn Gladu; 40,597; 53.1%	Lo-Anne Chan; 4,088; 5.4%		Brian Everaert; 1,136; 1.5%	Jacques Y Boudreau (Libert.); 990 1.3%	Marilyn Gladu; Sarnia—Lambton
Sarnia—Lambton—Bkejwanong	George Vandenberg; 28,940; 37.9%	Marilyn Gladu; 40,597; 53.1%	Lo-Anne Chan; 4,088; 5.4%		Brian Everaert; 1,136; 1.5%	Mark Lamore (CHP); 437 0.6%	Marilyn Gladu; Sarnia—Lambton
Sarnia—Lambton—Bkejwanong	George Vandenberg; 28,940; 37.9%	Marilyn Gladu; 40,597; 53.1%	Lo-Anne Chan; 4,088; 5.4%		Brian Everaert; 1,136; 1.5%	Tony Mitchell (Rhino.); 201 0.3%	Marilyn Gladu; Sarnia—Lambton
Windsor—Tecumseh—Lakeshore (judicially certified)	Irek Kusmierczyk; 32,086; 45.7%	Kathy Borrelli; 32,090; 45.8%	Alex Ilijoski; 4,240; 6.0%	Roxanne Tellier; 468; 0.7%	Nick Babic; 828; 1.2%	Helmi Charif (Cent.); 223 0.3%	Irek Kusmierczyk; Windsor—Tecumseh
Windsor—Tecumseh—Lakeshore (judicially certified)	Irek Kusmierczyk; 32,086; 45.7%	Kathy Borrelli; 32,090; 45.8%	Alex Ilijoski; 4,240; 6.0%	Roxanne Tellier; 468; 0.7%	Nick Babic; 828; 1.2%	Beth St Denis (CHP); 203 0.3%	Irek Kusmierczyk; Windsor—Tecumseh
Windsor West	Richard Pollock; 16,986; 30.9%	Harb Gill; 21,412; 39.0%	Brian Masse; 15,256; 27.8%	Louay Ahmad; 397; 0.7%	Jacob Bezaire; 553; 1.0%	Joseph Markham (Comm.); 195 0.4%	Brian Masse
Windsor West	Richard Pollock; 16,986; 30.9%	Harb Gill; 21,412; 39.0%	Brian Masse; 15,256; 27.8%	Louay Ahmad; 397; 0.7%	Jacob Bezaire; 553; 1.0%	Margaret Villamizar (M-L); 89 0.2%	Brian Masse

=== Northern Ontario ===
Electoral district	Candidates						Incumbent
Electoral district	Liberal	Conservative	NDP	Green	PPC	Other	Incumbent
Kapuskasing—Timmins—Mushkegowuk	Steve Black; 18,366; 39.0%	Gaétan Malette; 23,062; 48.9%	Nicole Fortier Levesque; 4,895; 10.4%		Serge Lefebvre; 814; 1.7%		Charlie Angus†; Timmins—James Bay
Kenora—Kiiwetinoong	Charles Fox; 9,454; 35.2%	Eric Melillo; 13,109; 48.7%	Tania Cameron; 3,698; 13.8%	Jon Hobbs; 286; 1.1%	Bryce Desjarlais; 204; 0.8%	Kelvin Boucher-Chicago (Ind.); 141; 0.5%	Eric Melillo; Kenora
Nipissing—Timiskaming	Pauline Rochefort; 27,674; 47.2%	Garry Keller; 26,121; 44.6%	Valerie Kennedy; 3,548; 6.1%	Louise Poitras; 585; 1.0%	John Janssen; 648; 1.1%		Anthony Rota†
Parry Sound—Muskoka	Geordie Sabbagh; 27,563; 42.6%	Scott Aitchison; 33,742; 52.2%	Heather Hay; 2,300; 3.6%		Isabel Pereira; 1,048; 1.6%		Scott Aitchison
Sault Ste. Marie—Algoma	Terry Sheehan; 30,936; 47.4%	Hugh Stevenson; 29,208; 44.7%	Laura Mayer; 4,327; 6.6%	Robyn Kiki Eshkibok; 541; 0.8%		James Collins (CHP); 305; 0.5%	Terry Sheehan; Sault Ste. Marie
Sault Ste. Marie—Algoma	Terry Sheehan; 30,936; 47.4%	Hugh Stevenson; 29,208; 44.7%	Laura Mayer; 4,327; 6.6%	Robyn Kiki Eshkibok; 541; 0.8%		James Collins (CHP); 305; 0.5%	Merged District
Sault Ste. Marie—Algoma	Terry Sheehan; 30,936; 47.4%	Hugh Stevenson; 29,208; 44.7%	Laura Mayer; 4,327; 6.6%	Robyn Kiki Eshkibok; 541; 0.8%		James Collins (CHP); 305; 0.5%	Carol Hughes†; Algoma—Manitoulin—Kapuskasing
Sudbury	Viviane Lapointe; 31,551; 51.9%	Ian Symington; 23,835; 39.2%	Nadia Verrelli; 4,680; 7.7%		Nicholas Bonderoff; 773; 1.3%		Viviane Lapointe
Sudbury East—Manitoulin—Nickel Belt	Marc G. Serré; 25,075; 41.6%	Jim Belanger; 29,156; 48.3%	Andréane Chénier; 4,822; 8.0%	Himal Hossain; 465; 0.8%	Sharilynne St. Louis; 489; 0.8%	Justin Dean Newell Leroux (Libert.); 316; 0.5%	Marc Serré; Nickel Belt
Thunder Bay—Rainy River	Marcus Powlowski; 21,125; 48.5%	Brendan Hyatt; 18,685; 42.9%	Yuk-Sem Won; 2,954; 6.8%	Eric Arner; 334; 0.8%	Sabrina Ree; 433; 1.0%		Marcus Powlowski
Thunder Bay—Superior North	Patty Hajdu; 25,134; 55.2%	Bob Herman; 16,267; 35.7%	Joy Wakefield; 3,235; 7.1%	John Malcolm Northey; 417; 0.9%	Amos Bradley; 459; 1.0%		Patty Hajdu

== Student vote results ==
Student votes are mock elections that run parallel to actual elections, in which students not of voting age participate. They are administered by Student Vote Canada. These are for educational purposes and do not count towards the results.

Summary of the 2025 Canadian Student Vote in Ontario
Party	Leader	Seats			Popular vote		
Party	Leader	Elected	%	Δ	Votes	%	Δ (pp)
Liberal	Mark Carney	60	49.18	▲7	107,487	35.90	▲6.67
Conservative	Pierre Poilievre	58	47.54	▲27	101,415	33.87	▲11.10
New Democratic	Jagmeet Singh	3	2.46	▼33	39,519	13.20	▼14.67
Green	Elizabeth May & Jonathan Pedneault	1	0.82	0	24,684	8.24	▼1.86
Other		0	0	0	15,150	5.06	▲2.27
People's	Maxime Bernier	0	0	0	11,193	3.74	▼3.27
Total		122	100.00	▲1	299,448	100.00	–
Source: Student Vote Canada

== See also ==
- Carleton in the 2025 Canadian federal election
