= Carleton in the 2025 Canadian federal election =

- 28 April 2025

Riding of Carleton
- Opinion polls
- Turnout: 86,655; 81.36% (▲5.54pp)
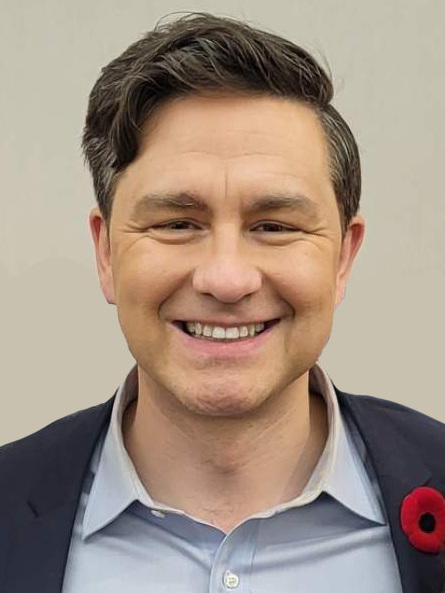
	First party	Second party
	Lib
Candidate	Bruce Fanjoy	Pierre Poilievre
Party	Liberal	Conservative
Popular vote	43,846	39,333
Percentage	50.95%	45.70%
Swing	▲19.09pp	▼6.15pp
MP before election
Pierre Poilievre
Conservative
Elected MP
Bruce Fanjoy
Liberal

An election took place in the federal electoral district of Carleton on April 28, 2025 as part of the 2025 Canadian federal election. Liberal Party candidate Bruce Fanjoy defeated Conservative Party leader and leader of the Opposition Pierre Poilievre by over 4,300 votes in an upset victory. During the campaign, it became "one of the most-watched races in the country".

== Background ==
Carleton, which covers much of Ottawa's rural area and outer suburbs, was considered a Conservative stronghold seat, with Poilievre holding it, and its predecessor seat Nepean—Carleton since the 2004 Canadian federal election. First elected when he was 25 years old, Poilievre won seven straight elections, with only the 2015 election being close. The 2025 election was the first with Poilievre as leader of the Conservatives.

== Campaign ==
Fanjoy, a stay-at-home father, former businessman, and environmentalist began canvassing the district in 2023, and officially became the Liberal candidate in June 2024. His candidacy was initially seen as a "long shot", with many people being skeptical of his chances. During the campaign, he went through two pairs of shoes and a pair of boots, while door-knocking five days a week, estimating that he knocked on 15,000 doors, and raised more than $100,000.

It was not until the last stages of the campaign when the Conservatives began to be worried that the riding was in danger of being lost. With just a few days to go before election day, a source from the Liberal campaign confirmed with the press that their projections showed that the gap between Poilievre and Fanjoy had dropped to five points.

Both the Liberals and Conservatives sent extra campaign workers to the riding in the final days of the campaign, with Conservative sources confirming Poilievre was at risk of losing the seat. Poilievre visited the riding the night before election day, though almost half of all voters had already cast their ballots in advance polls, the most of any district in the country. Previously, Poilievre had only visited the riding at the beginning of the election to launch his campaign.

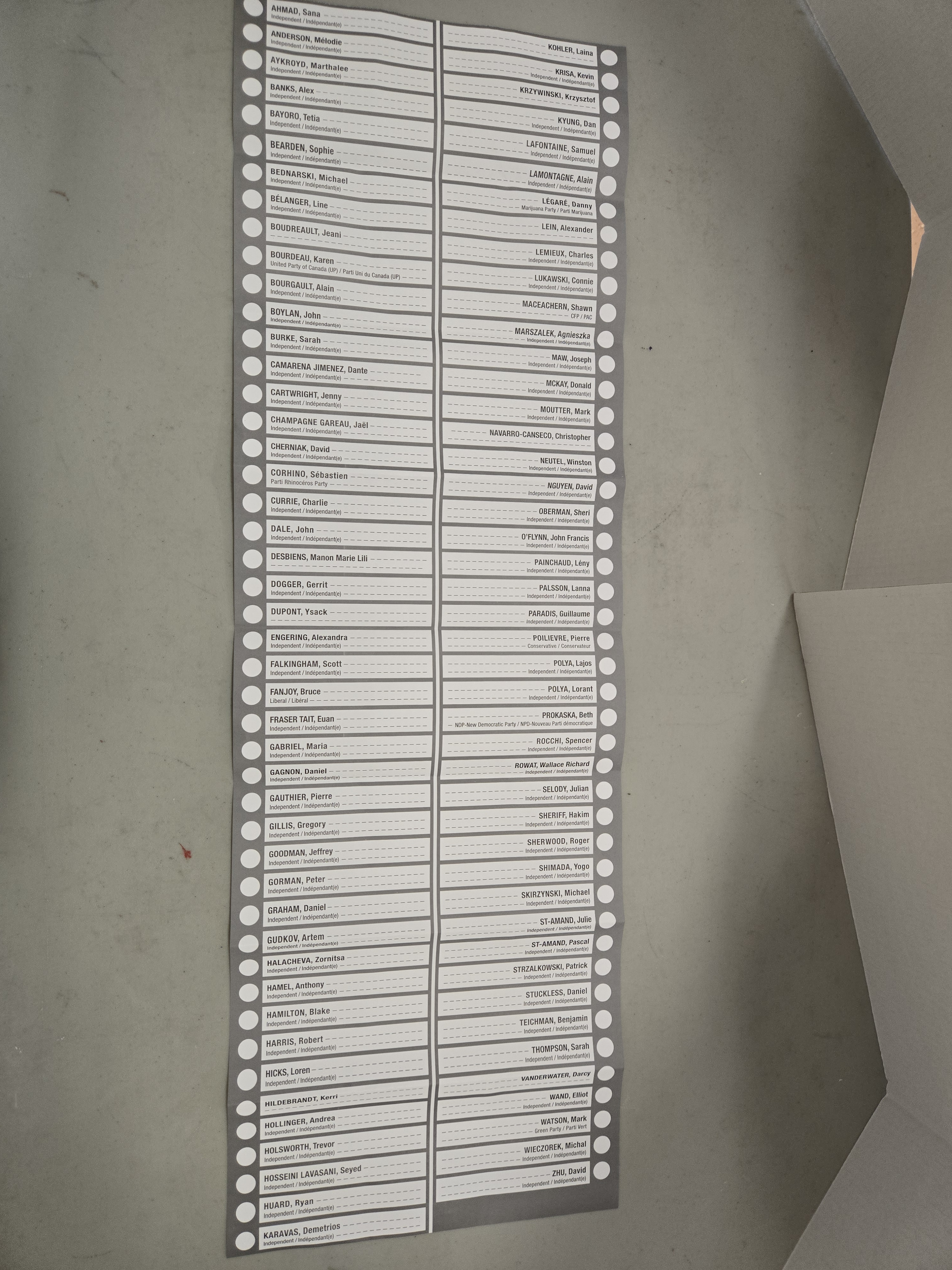
Ballot paper for the 2025 election

In addition to the race being a high-profile one, the campaign was targeted by the Longest Ballot Committee, whose aim is to field many candidates to protest Canada's use of the first-past-the-post voting system. In total, 91 candidates ran in the seat, tying the record for the most candidates on a federal ballot. The ballot was a metre long and caused logistical difficulties.

Owing to the closeness of the result, and the sheer length of the ballots, the CBC finally called the race for Fanjoy at 5:00am on election night.

Fanjoy credited his victory to the ongoing trade war with the United States spurred on by President of the United States Donald Trump, with the Liberal campaign drawing parallels between Poilievre and Trump's styles. Many federal public servants live in the riding and Fanjoy targeted them with fears of job cuts by Poilievre. Fanjoy also stated that Poilievre "took the riding for granted". Other factors that were attributed to Poilievre's loss include the suburbanization of the riding, with people moving there during the COVID-19 pandemic in Ottawa, as well as Poilievre's support for the Canada convoy protest, which occupied the city's downtown during the pandemic.

== Aftermath ==
Despite losing the seat, Poilievre decided to stay on as Conservative leader. As a result, Battle River—Crowfoot MP Damien Kurek announced his intention to vacate his seat, which would trigger a by-election in his riding and allow Poilievre a chance to return to Parliament. Poilievre was elected on August 18, returning to the House of Commons.

== Results ==
2025 Canadian federal election: Carleton
Party	Candidate	Votes	%	±%
Liberal	Bruce Fanjoy	43,846	50.95	+19.09
Conservative	Pierre Poilievre	39,333	45.70	−6.15
New Democratic	Beth Prokaska	1,221	1.42	−9.95
Green	Mark Watson	561	0.65	−1.49
United	Karen Bourdeau	112	0.13	N/A
Canadian Future	Shawn MacEachern	63	0.07	N/A
Independent	Lorant Polya	57	0.07	
Independent	Scott Falkingham	45	0.05	
Independent	Sana Ahmad	41	0.05	
Independent	Pierre Gauthier	38	0.04	
Marijuana	Danny Légaré	37	0.04	N/A
Independent	Guillaume Paradis	37	0.04	
Independent	Dan Kyung	35	0.04	
Rhinoceros	Sébastien CoRhino	31	0.04	N/A
Independent	Sarah Burke	27	0.03	
Independent	Mark Moutter	23	0.03	
Independent	David Zhu	21	0.02	
Independent	Charlie Currie	20	0.02	
Independent	John Dale	20	0.02	
Independent	Euan Fraser Tait	18	0.02	
Independent	John Boylan	17	0.02	
Independent	Mélodie Anderson	16	0.02	
Independent	Alex Banks	16	0.02	
Independent	Michael Bednarski	15	0.02	
Independent	David Nguyen	15	0.02	
Independent	Sophie Bearden	14	0.02	
Independent	Seyed Hosseini Lavasani	13	0.02	
No affiliation	Jeani Boudreault	12	0.01	
Independent	Alexandra Engering	12	0.01	
Independent	Lajos Polya	12	0.01	
No affiliation	Darcy Vanderwater	12	0.01	
Independent	Jenny Cartwright	11	0.01	
Independent	Jeffrey Goodman	11	0.01	
Independent	Donald McKay	11	0.01	
Independent	Daniel Stuckless	11	0.01	
Independent	Maria Gabriel	10	0.01	
No affiliation	Laina Kohler	10	0.01	
Independent	Charles Lemieux	10	0.01	
Independent	Marthalee Aykroyd	9	0.01	
Independent	Ryan Huard	9	0.01	
Independent	Sarah Thompson	9	0.01	
Independent	Alain Bourgault	8	0.01	
Independent	Daniel Gagnon	8	0.01	
Independent	Robert Harris	8	0.01	
Independent	Andrea Hollinger	8	0.01	
Independent	Connie Lukawski	8	0.01	
Independent	John Francis O'Flynn	8	0.01	
Independent	Peter Gorman	7	0.01	
Independent	Julian Selody	7	0.01	
Independent	Michal Wieczorek	7	0.01	
Independent	Line Bélanger	6	0.01	
Independent	Blake Hamilton	6	0.01	
Independent	Loren Hicks	6	0.01	
No affiliation	Alexander Lein	6	0.01	
Independent	Agnieszka Marszalek	6	0.01	
Independent	Hakim Sheriff	6	0.01	
Independent	Tetia Bayoro	5	0.01	
Independent	David Cherniak	5	0.01	
Independent	Kevin Krisa	5	0.01	
Independent	Alain Lamontagne	5	0.01	
Independent	Winston Neutel	5	0.01	
Independent	Lény Painchaud	5	0.01	
Independent	Elliot Wand	5	0.01	
Independent	Dante Camarena Jimenez	4	0.00	
Independent	Jaël Champagne Gareau	4	0.00	
Independent	Gerrit Dogger	4	0.00	
Independent	Gregory Gillis	4	0.00	
No affiliation	Christopher Navarro-Canseco	4	0.00	
Independent	Lanna Palsson	4	0.00	
Independent	Spencer Rocchi	4	0.00	
Independent	Patrick Strzalkowski	4	0.00	
No affiliation	Manon Marie Lili Desbiens	3	0.00	
Independent	Artem Gudkov	3	0.00	
No affiliation	Kerri Hildebrandt	3	0.00	
Independent	Trevor Holsworth	3	0.00	
No affiliation	Krzysztof Krzywinski	3	0.00	
Independent	Samuel Lafontaine	3	0.00	
Independent	Roger Sherwood	3	0.00	
Independent	Yogo Shimada	3	0.00	
Independent	Michael Skirzynski	3	0.00	
Independent	Julie St-Amand	3	0.00	
Independent	Daniel Graham	2	0.00	
Independent	Zornitsa Halacheva	2	0.00	
Independent	Anthony Hamel	2	0.00	
Independent	Demetrios Karavas	2	0.00	
Independent	Sheri Oberman	2	0.00	
Independent	Wallace Richard Rowat	2	0.00	
Independent	Pascal St-Amand	2	0.00	
Independent	Benjamin Teichman	2	0.00	
Independent	Joseph Maw	1	0.00	
No affiliation	Ysack Dupont	0	0.00	
Total valid votes		86,060	99.31	
Total rejected ballots		595	0.69	+0.14
Turnout		86,655	81.36	+5.54
Eligible voters		106,504		
Liberal notional gain from Conservative		Swing		+12.62
Source: Elections Canada

== Previous result ==
2021 federal election redistributed results
Party	Vote	%
Conservative	36,534	51.86
Liberal	22,448	31.86
New Democratic	8,012	11.37
People's	1,939	2.75
Green	1,512	2.15
Free	7	0.01
Total valid votes	70,452	99.45
Rejected ballots	390	0.55
Registered voters/ estimated turnout	93,425	75.83

2021 Canadian federal election: Carleton
Party	Candidate	Votes	%	±%	Expenditures
Conservative	Pierre Poilievre	35,356	49.9	+3.55	$108,590.73
Liberal	Gustave Roy	24,298	34.3	−3.93	$91,061.91
New Democratic	Kevin Hua	8,164	11.5	+2.16	$3,138.40
People's	Peter Crawley	1,728	2.4	+1.26	$1,053.55
Green	Nira Dookeran	1,327	1.9	−3.04	$2,403.07
Total valid votes/expense limit		70,873	99.37	—	$122,996.20
Total rejected ballots		447	0.63	+0.03	
Turnout		71,320	74.57	−2.61	
Eligible voters		95,639			
Conservative hold		Swing		+3.74	
Source: Elections Canada

== See also ==
- 2025 Canadian federal election in Ontario
- Burnaby Central in the 2025 Canadian federal election
- Terrebonne in the 2025 Canadian federal election
- 2025 Battle River—Crowfoot federal by-election
