= Opinion polling for the 2025 Canadian federal election by constituency =

Various polling organizations have conducted opinion polling in specific ridings in the lead up to the 2025 Canadian federal election on April 28, 2025. The results of publicized opinion polling for individual constituencies are detailed in this article.

Given the expense of polling individual constituencies, constituencies are usually only polled if they are of some particular interest, e.g. they are thought to be marginal or facing an impending by-election. The constituencies polled are not necessarily representative of a national average swing. Under the first-past-the-post electoral system the true marginal seats, by definition, will be decisive as to the outcome of the election.

== Constituency polls ==
=== British Columbia ===
==== Burnaby Central ====
Polling Firm	Last Date of Polling	Link	Liberal	Cons.	NDP	Green	PPC	Others	Undecided	Margin of Error^{[1]}	Sample Size^{[2]}	Polling Method^{[3]}
Cardinal Research	April 16, 2025		37	34	17	2	—N/a	1	9	±3 pp	952	Telephone/IVR/door-to-door
Cardinal Research	April 9, 2025		26	37	17	0	—N/a	0	19	±3 pp	1000	Telephone/IVR/door-to-door
Cardinal Research	April 2, 2025		32	28	16	2	—N/a	0	22	±4.6 pp	453	Telephone/IVR/door-to-door

==== Burnaby North—Seymour ====
Polling Firm	Last Date of Polling	Link	Liberal	Cons.	NDP	Green	PPC	Others	Undecided	Margin of Error^{[1]}	Sample Size^{[2]}	Polling Method^{[3]}
Cardinal Research	April 16, 2025		52	30	6	2	—N/a	2	8	±4 pp	737	Telephone/IVR/door-to-door
Cardinal Research	April 9, 2025		44	32	6	1	—N/a	0	17	±3 pp	1000	Telephone/IVR/door-to-door
Cardinal Research	April 2, 2025		38	27	7	2	—N/a	1	25	±3.6 pp	745	Telephone/IVR/door-to-door

==== Cloverdale—Langley City ====
Polling Firm	Last Date of Polling	Link	Liberal	Cons.	NDP	Green	PPC	Others	Undecided	Margin of Error^{[1]}	Sample Size^{[2]}	Polling Method^{[3]}
Cardinal Research	April 16, 2025		36	46	6	1	—N/a	1	10	±3 pp	990	Telephone/IVR/door-to-door
Cardinal Research	April 9, 2025		36	34	7	1	—N/a	0	20	±4 pp	480	Telephone/IVR/door-to-door
Cardinal Research	April 2, 2025		35	33	6	1	—N/a	1	23	±2.7 pp	1,362	Telephone/IVR/door-to-door

==== Coquitlam—Port Coquitlam ====
Polling Firm	Last Date of Polling	Link	Liberal	Cons.	NDP	Green	Others	Undecided	Margin of Error^{[1]}	Sample Size^{[2]}	Polling Method^{[3]}
Cardinal Research	April 16, 2025		41	39	8	1	1	10	±3 pp	984	Telephone/IVR/door-to-door
Cardinal Research	April 9, 2025		38	32	8	3	0	18	±3 pp	808	Telephone/IVR/door-to-door
Cardinal Research	April 2, 2025		49	25	12	3	1	10	±4.1 pp	558	Telephone/IVR/door-to-door

==== Cowichan—Malahat—Langford ====
Polling Firm	Last Date of Polling	Link	Liberal	Cons.	NDP	Green	Undecided	Margin of Error^{[1]}	Sample Size^{[2]}	Polling Method^{[3]}
Research Co.	April 19, 2025		19	36	29	5	11	±4.9 pp	401	Telephone/Online

==== Nanaimo—Ladysmith ====
Polling Firm	Last Date of Polling	Link	Liberal	Cons.	NDP	Green	PPC	Undecided	Margin of Error^{[1]}	Sample Size^{[2]}	Polling Method^{[3]}
Oracle Poll	April 24, 2025		22	35	14	28	1	—N/a	±3.5 pp	800	IVR
Oracle Poll	March 31, 2025		27	34	9	29	2	—N/a	±4.0 pp	600	IVR
Oracle Poll	February 16, 2025^{[4]}		6	41	22	28	3	—N/a	±4.0 pp	600	IVR

==== New Westminster—Burnaby—Maillardville ====
Polling Firm	Last Date of Polling	Link	Liberal	NDP	Cons.	Green	Others	Undecided	Margin of Error^{[1]}	Sample Size^{[2]}	Polling Method^{[3]}
2025 election	April 28, 2025		35	32	31	1	1	–	–	56,034	—N/a
Cardinal Research	April 2, 2025		37	22	19	3	0	19	±4.8 pp	407	Telephone/IVR/door-to-door

==== North Island—Powell River ====
Polling Firm	Last Date of Polling	Link	Liberal	Cons.	NDP	Green	PPC	Ind.	Undecided	Margin of Error^{[1]}	Sample Size^{[2]}	Polling Method^{[3]}
Research Co.	April 19, 2025		13	45	23	2	2	1	15	±4.9 pp	402	Telephone/Online

==== North Vancouver—Capilano ====
Polling Firm	Last Date of Polling	Link	Liberal	Cons.	NDP	Green	PPC	Others	Undecided	Margin of Error^{[1]}	Sample Size^{[2]}	Polling Method^{[3]}
Cardinal Research	April 16, 2025		56	32	6	3	—N/a	1	2	±3 pp	783	Telephone/IVR/door-to-door
Cardinal Research	April 9, 2025		51	32	4	1	—N/a	0	11	±3 pp	1000	Telephone/IVR/door-to-door
Cardinal Research	April 2, 2025		42	29	9	2	—N/a	1	17	±3.5 pp	779	Telephone/IVR/door-to-door

==== Saanich—Gulf Islands ====
Polling Firm	Last Date of Polling	Link	Liberal	Cons.	NDP	Green	PPC	Undecided	Margin of Error^{[1]}	Sample Size^{[2]}	Polling Method^{[3]}
Oracle Poll	April 10, 2025		27	31	6	35	—N/a	—N/a	±4.0 pp	600	IVR
Oracle Poll	March 25, 2025		22	28	8	41	1	—N/a	±4.0 pp	600	IVR

==== Surrey Centre ====
Polling Firm	Last Date of Polling	Link	Liberal	Cons.	NDP	Green	PPC	Others	Undecided	Margin of Error^{[1]}	Sample Size^{[2]}	Polling Method^{[3]}
Cardinal Research	April 16, 2025		40	40	7	1	—N/a	1	11	±3 pp	934	Telephone/IVR/door-to-door
Cardinal Research	April 2, 2025		29	29	13	2	—N/a	0	29	±2.4 pp	1,638	Telephone/IVR/door-to-door

==== Vancouver Fraserview—South Burnaby ====
Polling Firm	Last Date of Polling	Link	Liberal	Cons.	NDP	Green	PPC	Others	Undecided	Margin of Error^{[1]}	Sample Size^{[2]}	Polling Method^{[3]}
Cardinal Research	April 2, 2025		27	29	21	5	—N/a	3	15	±5.5 pp	313	Telephone/IVR/door-to-door

==== Vancouver Granville ====
Polling Firm	Last Date of Polling	Link	Liberal	Cons.	NDP	Green	Others	Undecided	Margin of Error^{[1]}	Sample Size^{[2]}	Polling Method^{[3]}
Cardinal Research	April 16, 2025		58	29	8	1	1	3	±4 pp	533	Telephone/IVR/door-to-door
Cardinal Research	April 9, 2025		48	29	7	1	0	15	±3 pp	1000	Telephone/IVR/door-to-door
Cardinal Research	April 2, 2025		51	19	8	2	0	20	±4.1 pp	577	Telephone/IVR/door-to-door

==== Vancouver Quadra ====
Polling Firm	Last Date of Polling	Link	Liberal	Cons.	NDP	Green	PPC	Others	Undecided	Margin of Error^{[1]}	Sample Size^{[2]}	Polling Method^{[3]}
Cardinal Research	April 16, 2025		57	25	5	3	—N/a	0	10	±3 pp	922	Telephone/IVR/door-to-door
Cardinal Research	April 9, 2025		45	29	5	1	—N/a	0	20	±3 pp	1000	Telephone/IVR/door-to-door
Cardinal Research	April 2, 2025		53	26	6	2	—N/a	1	12	±3.6 pp	729	Telephone/IVR/door-to-door

=== Manitoba ===
==== Portage—Lisgar ====
Polling Firm	Last Date of Polling	Link	Liberal	Cons.	NDP	Green	PPC	Others	Undecided	Margin of Error^{[1]}	Sample Size^{[2]}	Polling Method^{[3]}
Mainstreet Research	June 14, 2023^{[4]}		14	37	8	3	24	2	12	±5.2 pp	555	IVR

==== Winnipeg South Centre ====
Polling Firm	Last Date of Polling	Link	Liberal	Cons.	NDP	Green	PPC	Others	Undecided	Margin of Error^{[1]}	Sample Size^{[2]}	Polling Method^{[3]}
Mainstreet Research	June 14, 2023^{[4]}		46	28	14	2	2	1	7	±4.7 pp	430	IVR

=== Ontario ===
==== Aurora—Oak Ridges—Richmond Hill ====
Polling Firm	Last Date of Polling	Link	Liberal	Cons.	NDP	Green	PPC	Others	Undecided	Margin of Error^{[1]}	Sample Size^{[2]}	Polling Method^{[3]}
Cardinal Research	April 16, 2025		40	42	1	1	—N/a	0	16	±4 pp	562	Telephone/IVR/door-to-door
Cardinal Research	April 2, 2025		43	41	4	2	—N/a	1	9	±4.6 pp	443	Telephone/IVR/door-to-door

==== Carleton ====
Polling Firm	Last Date of Polling	Link	Liberal	Cons.	NDP	Green	PPC	Others	Undecided	Margin of Error^{[1]}	Sample Size^{[2]}	Polling Method^{[3]}
Mainstreet Research	June 14, 2022^{[4]}		38.0	41.7	9.5	2.0	0.8	1.5	5.8	±4.2 pp	555	IVR

==== Eglinton—Lawrence ====
Polling Firm	Last Date of Polling	Link	Liberal	Cons.	NDP	Green	PPC	Others	Undecided	Margin of Error^{[1]}	Sample Size^{[2]}	Polling Method^{[3]}
Cardinal Research	April 16, 2025		54	32	4	2	—N/a	2	6	±3 pp	980	Telephone/IVR/door-to-door
Cardinal Research	April 9, 2025		56	27	3	0	—N/a	0	13	±4 pp	678	Telephone/IVR/door-to-door
Cardinal Research	April 2, 2025		49	31	5	2	—N/a	2	11	±3.2 pp	945	Telephone/IVR/door-to-door

==== Etobicoke—Lakeshore ====
Polling Firm	Last Date of Polling	Link	Liberal	Cons.	NDP	Green	PPC	Others	Undecided	Margin of Error^{[1]}	Sample Size^{[2]}	Polling Method^{[3]}
Cardinal Research	April 16, 2025		62	28	6	2	—N/a	0	2	±4 pp	587	Telephone/IVR/door-to-door
Cardinal Research	April 9, 2025		53	26	2	0	—N/a	0	19	±5 pp	747	Telephone/IVR/door-to-door
Cardinal Research	April 2, 2025		49	28	7	3	—N/a	2	11	±3.5 pp	845	Telephone/IVR/door-to-door

==== Mississauga—Erin Mills ====
Polling Firm	Last Date of Polling	Link	Liberal	Cons.	NDP	Green	PPC	Others	Undecided	Margin of Error^{[1]}	Sample Size^{[2]}	Polling Method^{[3]}
Cardinal Research	April 16, 2025		54	34	2	1	—N/a	1	8	±4 pp	714	Telephone/IVR/door-to-door
Cardinal Research	April 2, 2025		44	29	7	4	—N/a	0	16	±4.4 pp	506	Telephone/IVR/door-to-door

==== Mississauga—Lakeshore ====
Polling Firm	Last Date of Polling	Link	Liberal	Cons.	NDP	Green	PPC	Others	Undecided	Margin of Error^{[1]}	Sample Size^{[2]}	Polling Method^{[3]}
Cardinal Research	April 16, 2025		53	36	2	1	—N/a	2	6	±3 pp	848	Telephone/IVR/door-to-door
Cardinal Research	April 2, 2025		54	25	4	7	—N/a	1	14	±3.1 pp	1,006	Telephone/IVR/door-to-door
Mainstreet Research	December 8, 2022^{[4]}		47.5	38.8	6.0	4.6	3.1	2	1.5	±5.9 pp	279	IVR
Mainstreet Research	October 27, 2022^{[4]}		43.5	40.8	6.9	5.7	1.2	1.9	N/A	±4.3 pp	521	IVR

==== Mississauga—Streetsville ====
Polling Firm	Last Date of Polling	Link	Liberal	Cons.	NDP	Green	PPC	Others	Undecided	Margin of Error^{[1]}	Sample Size^{[2]}	Polling Method^{[3]}
Cardinal Research	April 16, 2025		52	36	2	2	—N/a	1	7	±4 pp	822	Telephone/IVR/door-to-door
Cardinal Research	April 2, 2025		43	39	6	2	—N/a	1	18	±3.6 pp	722	Telephone/IVR/door-to-door

==== Oakville East ====
Polling Firm	Last Date of Polling	Link	Liberal	Cons.	NDP	Green	PPC	Others	Undecided	Margin of Error^{[1]}	Sample Size^{[2]}	Polling Method^{[3]}
Cardinal Research	April 16, 2025		54	36	3	2	—N/a	1	4	±4 pp	646	Telephone/IVR/door-to-door
Cardinal Research	April 9, 2025		48	37	1	1	—N/a	0	13	±4 pp	497	Telephone/IVR/door-to-door
Cardinal Research	April 2, 2025		43	38	5	1	—N/a	2	11	±4 pp	616	Telephone/IVR/door-to-door

==== Oakville West ====
Polling Firm	Last Date of Polling	Link	Liberal	Cons.	NDP	Green	PPC	Others	Undecided	Margin of Error^{[1]}	Sample Size^{[2]}	Polling Method^{[3]}
Cardinal Research	April 16, 2025		57	33	3	2	—N/a	1	4	±4 pp	616	Telephone/IVR/door-to-door
Cardinal Research	April 9, 2025		53	29	2	1	—N/a	0	14	±4 pp	898	Telephone/IVR/door-to-door
Cardinal Research	April 2, 2025		48	32	7	2	—N/a	2	9	±3.3 pp	898	Telephone/IVR/door-to-door

==== Oxford ====
Polling Firm	Last Date of Polling	Link	Liberal	Cons.	NDP	Green	PPC	Others	Undecided	Margin of Error^{[1]}	Sample Size^{[2]}	Polling Method^{[3]}
Mainstreet Research	June 14, 2023^{[4]}		36	36	7	4	5	7	5	±4.5 pp	473	IVR

==== Richmond Hill South ====
Polling Firm	Last Date of Polling	Link	Liberal	Cons.	NDP	Green	PPC	Others	Undecided	Margin of Error^{[1]}	Sample Size^{[2]}	Polling Method^{[3]}
Cardinal Research	April 9, 2025		46	38	2	1	—N/a	0	12	±4 pp	493	Telephone/IVR/door-to-door
Cardinal Research	April 2, 2025		45	35	3	2	—N/a	1	14	±4 pp	583	Telephone/IVR/door-to-door

==== Toronto—St. Paul's ====
Polling Firm	Last Date of Polling	Link	Liberal	Cons.	NDP	Green	PPC	Others	Undecided	Margin of Error^{[1]}	Sample Size^{[2]}	Polling Method^{[3]}
Mainstreet Research	June 2024^{[4]}		35	36	9.9	4	2.5	1.5	11	N/A	257	IVR

==== York Centre ====
Polling Firm	Last Date of Polling	Link	Liberal	Cons.	NDP	Green	Others	Undecided	Margin of Error^{[1]}	Sample Size^{[2]}	Polling Method^{[3]}
Cardinal Research	April 16, 2025		38	44	5	2	2	9	±4 pp	759	Telephone/IVR/door-to-door
Cardinal Research	April 2, 2025		35	34	10	3	2	16	±4.4 pp	505	Telephone/IVR/door-to-door

=== Quebec ===
==== LaSalle—Émard—Verdun ====
Polling Firm	Last Date of Polling	Link	Liberal	Cons.	BQ	NDP	Green	PPC	Others	Margin of Error^{[1]}	Sample Size^{[2]}	Polling Method^{[3]}
Mainstreet Research	September 9, 2024^{[4]}		24.1	7.3	29.6	23.0	—N/a	—N/a	—N/a	±4.7 pp	443	IVR
Mainstreet Research	September 4, 2024^{[4]}		23.3	8.1	30.7	19.4	—N/a	—N/a	—N/a	—N/a	—N/a	IVR
Mainstreet Research	July 9, 2024^{[4]}		29	14	26	25	3	1	—N/a	±5.4 pp	329	IVR

=== Saskatchewan ===
==== Regina—Wascana ====
Polling Firm	Last Date of Polling	Link	Liberal	Cons.	NDP	Green	PPC	Undecided	Margin of Error^{[1]}	Sample Size^{[2]}	Polling Method^{[3]}
Spadina Strategies	April 12, 2025		43	44	5	1	1	6	±5.6 pp	303	IVR

==== Saskatoon—University ====
Polling Firm	Last Date of Polling	Link	Liberal	Cons.	NDP	Green	PPC	Undecided	Margin of Error^{[1]}	Sample Size^{[2]}	Polling Method^{[3]}
Spadina Strategies	April 26, 2025		42	40	13	1	1	3	±4.50 pp	472	IVR
Spadina Strategies	April 11, 2025		35	41	16	1	1	6	±5.41 pp	386	IVR

==== Saskatoon South ====
Polling Firm	Last Date of Polling	Link	Liberal	Cons.	NDP	Green	PPC	Undecided	Margin of Error^{[1]}	Sample Size^{[2]}	Polling Method^{[3]}
Spadina Strategies	April 26, 2025		39	41	14	1	2	4	±4.67 pp	438	IVR

==== Saskatoon West ====
Polling Firm	Last Date of Polling	Link	Liberal	Cons.	NDP	Green	PPC	Undecided	Margin of Error^{[1]}	Sample Size^{[2]}	Polling Method^{[3]}
Spadina Strategies	April 26, 2025		26	43	25	1	2	4	±4.83 pp	410	IVR

== See also ==
- Opinion polling for the 2025 Canadian federal election

== Notes ==
Notes

^{1} In cases when linked poll details distinguish between the margin of error associated with the total sample of respondents (including undecided and non-voters) and that of the subsample of decided/leaning voters, the latter is included in the table. Also not included is the margin of error created by rounding to the nearest whole number or any margin of error from methodological sources. Most online polls—because of their opt-in method of recruiting panellists which results in a non-random sample—cannot have a margin of error. In such cases, shown is what the margin of error would be for a survey using a random probability-based sample of equivalent size.
^{2} Refers to the total sample size, including undecided and non-voters.
^{3} "Telephone" refers to traditional telephone polls conducted by live interviewers; "IVR" refers to automated Interactive Voice Response polls conducted by telephone; "online" refers to polls conducted exclusively over the internet; "telephone/online" refers to polls which combine results from both telephone and online surveys, or for which respondents are initially recruited by telephone and then asked to complete an online survey.
^{4} Poll was conducted using the riding boundaries that existed before the 2022 Canadian federal electoral redistribution was implemented.
