= Sima Acan =

Canadian politician

Sima Acan MP

Member of Parliament for Oakville West
- Incumbent
- Assumed office April 28, 2025
- Preceded by: new riding

Personal details
- Born: 1979 (age 46–47) Ankara, Turkey
- Party: Liberal
- Education: Işık University
- Occupation: Politician, businesswoman
- Website: simaacan.ca

Ilgit Sima Acan MP is a Canadian politician from the Liberal Party of Canada. She was elected Member of Parliament for Oakville West in the 2025 Canadian federal election. Acan is the first Canadian of Turkish descent elected to the House of Commons, and is a former president of the Federation of Canadian Turkish Associations.

== Early life and career ==
Acan was born in Ankara, Turkey in 1979. She graduated in 2003 from Işık University and immigrated to Canada in 2007 at age 24.

Acan was previously the president of the Federation of Canadian Turkish Associations. In the immediate aftermath of the 2023 Turkey–Syria earthquakes, she criticized the Canadian government for not committing to sending search and rescue teams and instead only doing assessments of how it could best help 60 hours after the disaster. While she was president, the group released a 2023 statement in which the Armenian genocide was denied. When questioned about her role by The Hill Times in May 2025, Acan released a statement that she was not involved in the drafting of the statement and supported the Canadian government's Armenian genocide recognition.

Acan owns a robotics company in Oakville, Ontario.

== Federal politics ==
On August 20, 2024, Acan announced she will be seeking the nomination to become the Liberal candidate for the new riding of Oakville West, after MP Pam Damoff announced she will not be seeking re-election earlier that year. On November 13, 2024, Acan was acclaimed as the Liberal Party candidate for Oakville West in the 2025 federal election, making her the first ever female Turkish-Canadian candidate. She was elected on April 28, 2025 with an over 8% lead. The victory made her the first Member of Parliament of Turkish descent.

== Personal life ==
Acan lives in Oakville with her husband and two children.

== Electoral results ==
2025 Canadian federal election: Oakville West
** Preliminary results — Not yet official **
Party	Candidate	Votes	%	±%	Expenditures
Liberal	Sima Acan	31,383	52.94	+5.45	
Conservative	Tim Crowder	26,402	44.54	+6.07	
New Democratic	Diane Downey	823	1.39	–7.31	
Green	Chris Kowalchuk	360	0.61	–1.11	
People's	JD Meaney	252	0.43	–3.19	
Independent	Martin Gegus	61	0.10	N/A	
Total valid votes/expense limit					
Total rejected ballots					
Turnout		59,281	73.64		
Eligible voters		80,503			
Liberal notional hold		Swing		–0.31	
Source: Elections Canada
