= Bruce Fanjoy =

Canadian politician (born 1964)

Bruce Fanjoy MP

Member of Parliament for Carleton
- Incumbent
- Assumed office April 28, 2025
- Preceded by: Pierre Poilievre

Personal details
- Born: 1964 or 1965 (age 61–62) Toronto, Ontario, Canada
- Party: Liberal
- Children: 2
- Relatives: Harold Fanjoy (uncle); David Myles (third cousin)
- Education: Dalhousie University (BComm); Saint Mary's University (MBA)
- Website: brucefanjoy.liberal.ca

Bruce Fanjoy (born 1964 or 1965) is a Canadian politician who has been the member of Parliament (MP) for Carleton since 2025. A member of the Liberal Party, Fanjoy was elected in the 2025 federal election, unseating incumbent MP and Conservative leader Pierre Poilievre.

== Early life and career ==
Bruce Fanjoy was born c. 1964 in Toronto, Ontario, but grew up in Saint John, New Brunswick, with both of his parents having been from there. His family lived in the Saint John neighbourhood of Millidgeville where Fanjoy attended elementary school, after which they moved to Fredericton after Fanjoy's father, Emery Fanjoy, took a secretary position for the government. Fanjoy and his family later moved to Halifax, Nova Scotia. Fanjoy has a Bachelor of Commerce (BComm) from Dalhousie University and an Master of Business Administration (MBA) from Saint Mary's University. He worked in business and marketing, including as director of marketing at Deloitte, before focusing on being a parent and turning to volunteer roles.

== Political career ==
Fanjoy was elected MP for Carleton in the 2025 Canadian federal election, unseating Conservative leader Pierre Poilievre, who had held the riding seven times since the 2004 Canadian federal election. The election in Carleton was targeted by the activist group Longest Ballot Committee, which managed to get 91 candidates on the ballot. Despite this, Fanjoy received more than 50% of the votes in Carleton.

Fanjoy has sponsored an online government petition from a Manotick resident to require all federal party leaders to obtain top-secret security clearance, in response to Conservative leader Poilievre's refusal to do so, which the petition criticized as a "failure of leadership" that "exposes Canada to avoidable national security risks". The petition is open to Canadian citizens until April 2026 and received over 26,000 signatures as of 9 February. In February 2026, Fanjoy defended a hybrid work schedule in response to a federal order for public servants to work in the office four days a week. Fanjoy argued the order would create unnecessary costs, pollution, adversely affect work–life balance, and was an ineffective way to actually improve service quality.

== Personal life ==
Fanjoy resides in a house that he built in Ottawa's Manotick community. He has two children. Fanjoy's uncle, Harold Fanjoy, was a Progressive Conservative Member of the Legislative Assembly of New Brunswick (MLA) from 1974 to 1987. Fanjoy and incumbent Fredericton—Oromocto Liberal MP David Myles are third cousins through their shared great-great-grandparents.

== Electoral record ==
2025 Canadian federal election: Carleton
| Party | Candidate | Votes | % | ±% |
|---|---|---|---|---|
| Liberal | Bruce Fanjoy | 43,846 | 50.95 | +19.09 |
| Conservative | Pierre Poilievre | 39,333 | 45.70 | −6.15 |
| New Democratic | Beth Prokaska | 1,221 | 1.42 | −9.95 |
| Green | Mark Watson | 561 | 0.65 | −1.49 |
| United | Karen Bourdeau | 112 | 0.13 | N/A |
| Canadian Future | Shawn MacEachern | 63 | 0.07 | N/A |
| Independent | Lorant Polya | 57 | 0.07 | |
| Independent | Scott Falkingham | 45 | 0.05 | |
| Independent | Sana Ahmad | 41 | 0.05 | |
| Independent | Pierre Gauthier | 38 | 0.04 | |
| Marijuana | Danny Légaré | 37 | 0.04 | N/A |
| Independent | Guillaume Paradis | 37 | 0.04 | |
| Independent | Dan Kyung | 35 | 0.04 | |
| Rhinoceros | Sébastien CoRhino | 31 | 0.04 | N/A |
| Independent | Sarah Burke | 27 | 0.03 | |
| Independent | Mark Moutter | 23 | 0.03 | |
| Independent | David Zhu | 21 | 0.02 | |
| Independent | Charlie Currie | 20 | 0.02 | |
| Independent | John Dale | 20 | 0.02 | |
| Independent | Euan Fraser Tait | 18 | 0.02 | |
| Independent | John Boylan | 17 | 0.02 | |
| Independent | Mélodie Anderson | 16 | 0.02 | |
| Independent | Alex Banks | 16 | 0.02 | |
| Independent | Michael Bednarski | 15 | 0.02 | |
| Independent | David Nguyen | 15 | 0.02 | |
| Independent | Sophie Bearden | 14 | 0.02 | |
| Independent | Seyed Hosseini Lavasani | 13 | 0.02 | |
| No affiliation | Jeani Boudreault | 12 | 0.01 | |
| Independent | Alexandra Engering | 12 | 0.01 | |
| Independent | Lajos Polya | 12 | 0.01 | |
| No affiliation | Darcy Vanderwater | 12 | 0.01 | |
| Independent | Jenny Cartwright | 11 | 0.01 | |
| Independent | Jeffrey Goodman | 11 | 0.01 | |
| Independent | Donald McKay | 11 | 0.01 | |
| Independent | Daniel Stuckless | 11 | 0.01 | |
| Independent | Maria Gabriel | 10 | 0.01 | |
| No affiliation | Laina Kohler | 10 | 0.01 | |
| Independent | Charles Lemieux | 10 | 0.01 | |
| Independent | Marthalee Aykroyd | 9 | 0.01 | |
| Independent | Ryan Huard | 9 | 0.01 | |
| Independent | Sarah Thompson | 9 | 0.01 | |
| Independent | Alain Bourgault | 8 | 0.01 | |
| Independent | Daniel Gagnon | 8 | 0.01 | |
| Independent | Robert Harris | 8 | 0.01 | |
| Independent | Andrea Hollinger | 8 | 0.01 | |
| Independent | Connie Lukawski | 8 | 0.01 | |
| Independent | John Francis O'Flynn | 8 | 0.01 | |
| Independent | Peter Gorman | 7 | 0.01 | |
| Independent | Julian Selody | 7 | 0.01 | |
| Independent | Michal Wieczorek | 7 | 0.01 | |
| Independent | Line Bélanger | 6 | 0.01 | |
| Independent | Blake Hamilton | 6 | 0.01 | |
| Independent | Loren Hicks | 6 | 0.01 | |
| No affiliation | Alexander Lein | 6 | 0.01 | |
| Independent | Agnieszka Marszalek | 6 | 0.01 | |
| Independent | Hakim Sheriff | 6 | 0.01 | |
| Independent | Tetia Bayoro | 5 | 0.01 | |
| Independent | David Cherniak | 5 | 0.01 | |
| Independent | Kevin Krisa | 5 | 0.01 | |
| Independent | Alain Lamontagne | 5 | 0.01 | |
| Independent | Winston Neutel | 5 | 0.01 | |
| Independent | Lény Painchaud | 5 | 0.01 | |
| Independent | Elliot Wand | 5 | 0.01 | |
| Independent | Dante Camarena Jimenez | 4 | 0.00 | |
| Independent | Jaël Champagne Gareau | 4 | 0.00 | |
| Independent | Gerrit Dogger | 4 | 0.00 | |
| Independent | Gregory Gillis | 4 | 0.00 | |
| No affiliation | Christopher Navarro-Canseco | 4 | 0.00 | |
| Independent | Lanna Palsson | 4 | 0.00 | |
| Independent | Spencer Rocchi | 4 | 0.00 | |
| Independent | Patrick Strzalkowski | 4 | 0.00 | |
| No affiliation | Manon Marie Lili Desbiens | 3 | 0.00 | |
| Independent | Artem Gudkov | 3 | 0.00 | |
| No affiliation | Kerri Hildebrandt | 3 | 0.00 | |
| Independent | Trevor Holsworth | 3 | 0.00 | |
| No affiliation | Krzysztof Krzywinski | 3 | 0.00 | |
| Independent | Samuel Lafontaine | 3 | 0.00 | |
| Independent | Roger Sherwood | 3 | 0.00 | |
| Independent | Yogo Shimada | 3 | 0.00 | |
| Independent | Michael Skirzynski | 3 | 0.00 | |
| Independent | Julie St-Amand | 3 | 0.00 | |
| Independent | Daniel Graham | 2 | 0.00 | |
| Independent | Zornitsa Halacheva | 2 | 0.00 | |
| Independent | Anthony Hamel | 2 | 0.00 | |
| Independent | Demetrios Karavas | 2 | 0.00 | |
| Independent | Sheri Oberman | 2 | 0.00 | |
| Independent | Wallace Richard Rowat | 2 | 0.00 | |
| Independent | Pascal St-Amand | 2 | 0.00 | |
| Independent | Benjamin Teichman | 2 | 0.00 | |
| Independent | Joseph Maw | 1 | 0.00 | |
| No affiliation | Ysack Dupont | 0 | 0.00 | |
| Total valid votes | | 86,060 | 99.31 | |
| Total rejected ballots | | 595 | 0.69 | +0.14 |
| Turnout | | 86,655 | 81.36 | +5.54 |
| Eligible voters | | 106,504 | | |
| Liberal notional gain from Conservative | | Swing | | +12.62 |
Source: Elections Canada

== See also ==
- Ali France, who similarly defeated the leader of the opposition in the Australian election within the same week of Fanjoy's election
