= Oakville West =

Federal electoral district in Ontario, Canada

Ontario electoral district
- Interactive map of riding boundaries from the 2025 federal election

Federal electoral district
- Legislature: House of Commons
MP
Sima Acan
Liberal
- District created: 2023
- First contested: 2025
- Last contested: 2025
- District webpage: profile, map

Demographics
- Population (2021): 105,024
- Electors (2025): 79,315
- Area (km²): 68
- Pop. density (per km²): 1,544.5
- Census division: Halton
- Census subdivision: Oakville (part)

Oakville West (French: Oakville-Ouest) is a federal electoral district in Ontario, Canada. It was created in the 2022 Canadian federal electoral redistribution and based on the 2021 Canadian census. Its counterpart is Oakville East.

It contains all of the Town of Oakville west of Sixteen Mile Creek and includes parts previously in Oakville and Oakville North—Burlington. Sima Acan is the first and current MP for this riding, having been first elected in the 2025 Canadian federal election.

== Geography ==
Consists of that part of the Town of Oakville south of Sixteen Mile Creek; then generally west along said creek to Lake Ontario; then southwest in a straight line to the southwest limit of said town.

== Demographics ==
According to the 2021 Canadian census

Languages: 65.0% English, 4.9% Mandarin, 3.2% Arabic, 2.7% Spanish, 2.5% French, 1.9% Portuguese, 1.6% Urdu, 1.5% Serbo-Croatian, 1.5% Italian, 1.3% Polish, 1.2% Korean, 1.1% Punjabi, 1.1% Russian, 1.0% Hindi, 1.0% Tagalog

Religions: 56.3% Christian (31.0% Catholic, 4.1% Christian Orthodox, 4.1% Anglican, 3.5% United Church, 1.5% Presbyterian, 11.9% Other), 27.5% No religion, 8.4% Muslim, 4.1% Hindu, 1.6% Sikh

Median income: $47,600 (2020)

Average income: $77,400 (2020)

Panethnic groups in Oakville West (2021)
Panethnic group	2021	
Panethnic group	Pop.	%
European (Note: Statistic includes all persons that did not make up part of a visible minority or an indigenous identity.)	64,430	61.7%
South Asian	11,915	11.41%
East Asian (Note: Statistic includes total responses of "Chinese", "Korean", and "Japanese" under visible minority section on census.)	9,955	9.53%
Middle Eastern (Note: Statistic includes total responses of "West Asian" and "Arab" under visible minority section on census.)	5,670	5.43%
African	3,895	3.73%
Southeast Asian (Note: Statistic includes total responses of "Filipino" and "Southeast Asian" under visible minority section on census.)	3,055	2.93%
Latin American	2,460	2.36%
Indigenous	895	0.86%
Other/multiracial (Note: Statistic includes total responses of "Visible minority, n.i.e." and "Multiple visible minorities" under visible minority section on census.)	2,150	2.06%
Total responses	104,430	99.44%
Total population	105,015	100%
Notes: Totals greater than 100% due to multiple origin responses. Demographics based on 2022 Canadian federal electoral redistribution riding boundaries.

== History ==
Parliament	Years	Member	Party
Oakville West; Riding created from Oakville and Oakville North—Burlington
45th	2025–present	Sima Acan	Liberal

== Electoral results ==
2025 Canadian federal election
** Preliminary results — Not yet official **
Party	Candidate	Votes	%	±%	Expenditures
Liberal	Sima Acan	31,383	52.94	+5.45	
Conservative	Tim Crowder	26,402	44.54	+6.07	
New Democratic	Diane Downey	823	1.39	–7.31	
Green	Chris Kowalchuk	360	0.61	–1.11	
People's	JD Meaney	252	0.43	–3.19	
Independent	Martin Gegus	61	0.10	N/A	
Total valid votes/expense limit					
Total rejected ballots					
Turnout		59,281	73.64		
Eligible voters		80,503			
Liberal notional hold		Swing		–0.31	
Source: Elections Canada

2021 federal election redistributed results
Party	Vote	%
Liberal	23,623	47.49
Conservative	19,136	38.47
New Democratic	4,330	8.70
People's	1,800	3.62
Green	854	1.72

== Student vote results ==
2025 Oakville West student vote
46.06%	33.90%	7.36%	6.30%	3.57%	2.82%
Conservative	Liberal	NDP	Green	PPC	Other
