= Longest Ballot Committee =

Canadian activist movement

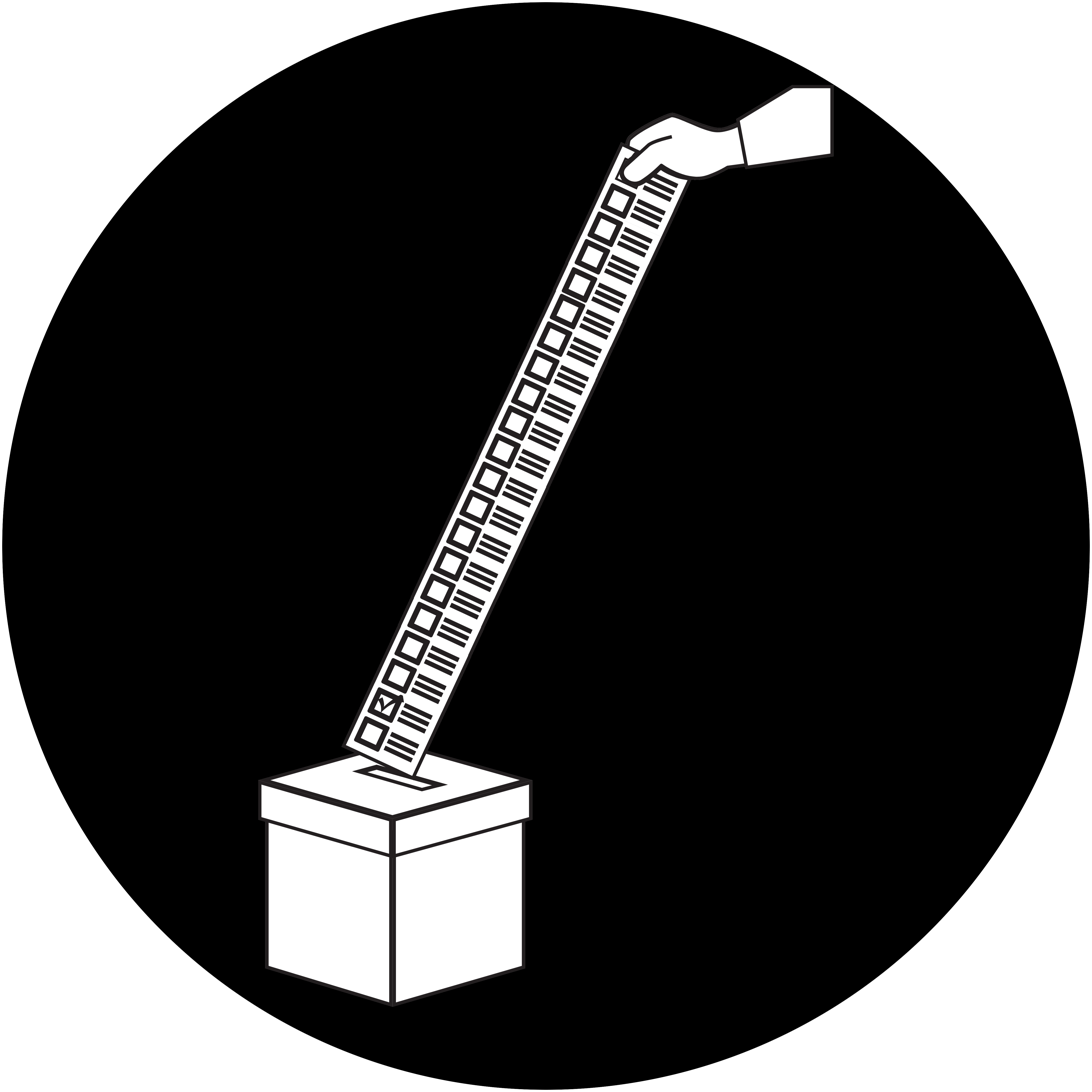
- Formation: 2019
- Location: Canada
- Affiliations: Rhinoceros Party; Marxist–Leninist Party; Marijuana Party (formerly)

The Longest Ballot Committee is a Canadian activist movement known for flooding ballots with a large number of independent and minor party candidates in protest of the first-past-the-post (FPTP) voting system in the country. The movement argues there is a conflict of interest when politicians are in charge of election rules, and calls for election law to be decided by a permanent, independent, and non-partisan body, such as a citizens' assembly. It is affiliated with the Rhinoceros Party and supported by the Marxist–Leninist Party and the now deregistered Marijuana Party.

== History ==
The first attempt for a long ballot was in the 2019 Canadian federal election, when the Rhinoceros Party attempted to set a Guinness World Record for the longest ballot paper in history in Conservative leader Andrew Scheer's riding of Regina—Qu'Appelle. Ultimately, only two candidates affiliated with the party ended up on the ballot.

The movement began garnering national attention after participating in the 2022 Mississauga—Lakeshore federal by-election, the 2023 Winnipeg South Centre federal by-election, and the 2024 Toronto—St. Paul's federal by-election. The committee's actions initially prompted Elections Canada to adapt voting procedures to accommodate unusually large numbers of candidates, and later contributed to calls for changes to federal election law intended to curtail long-ballot campaigns. In the June 2024 Toronto—St. Paul's federal by-election, it took hours for Elections Canada workers to count all the ballots. While polls closed at 8:30 p.m. ET, the final results were not known until about 4:30 a.m. The agency said it was bogged down because there were dozens of candidates on the unwieldy, nearly metre-long ballot—some of whom were proportional representation activists running as a protest to the country's first-past-the-post voting system.

In the 2025 federal election, the Longest Ballot Committee targeted the Carleton riding in the Ottawa area, where Conservative leader Pierre Poilievre was running. The committee's spokesperson Tomas Szuchewycz declared their efforts at highlighting electoral reform during the election a success, amid criticisms of their method.

A poll conducted in July 2025 with a sample size of 1,500 found that 43% of Canadians believed the method to be an inappropriate form of protest, while 30% felt it was appropriate. 47% support legislation to stop the Longest Ballot Committee, while 34% opposed. In both cases, Conservatives were more against the protest, while the Liberals and NDP were more supportive of it.

On July 28, 2025, on account of the registration of 214 candidates in the 2025 Battle River—Crowfoot federal by-election in which Poilievre was running, Elections Canada decided to use a special ballot similar to a mail-in ballot instead of the standard ballot, with a full list of candidates provided at polling stations. Elections Canada would do the same for the 2026 Terrebonne federal by-election, following voter feedback.

In 2026, Parliament amended the Canada Elections Act in response in part to long-ballot campaigns. The Strong and Free Elections Act (Bill C-25), which received royal assent on June 18, 2026, restricted an elector to signing the nomination paper of only one prospective candidate in a given election and prohibited a candidate's official agent from serving as the official agent of another candidate in the same electoral district at the same election. The government described the amendments as measures to mitigate long ballots, which it said created administrative and accessibility challenges for voters, candidates and election workers.

=== Elections in which the Longest Ballot Committee participated ===
Election	Riding	Candidates (Note: Total number of candidates on the ballot, including candidates who are not affiliated with the Longest Ballot Committee.)	Incumbent	Result
2019 federal election	Regina—Qu'Appelle	8	Conservative	Conservative hold
2021 federal election	Saint Boniface—Saint Vital	21	Liberal	Liberal hold
2022 federal by-election	Mississauga—Lakeshore	40	Liberal	Liberal hold
2023 federal by-election	Winnipeg South Centre	48	Liberal	Liberal hold
2023 Ontario by-election	Kitchener Centre	18	New Democratic	Green gain
2024 federal by-election	Toronto—St. Paul's	84	Liberal	Conservative gain
2024 federal by-election	LaSalle—Émard—Verdun	91	Liberal	Bloc Québécois gain
2025 federal election	Carleton	91	Conservative	Liberal gain
2025 federal by-election	Battle River—Crowfoot	214	Conservative	Conservative hold
2026 federal by-election	Terrebonne	48	Liberal (overturned by Supreme Court of Canada)	Liberal hold

=== Elections in which the Longest Ballot Committee planned to participate but did not participate ===
1. 2024 Cloverdale—Langley City federal by-election
2. 2025 Canadian federal election, University—Rosedale, riding of Chrystia Freeland
3. 2025 Canadian federal election, Nepean, riding of Mark Carney

== Gallery ==
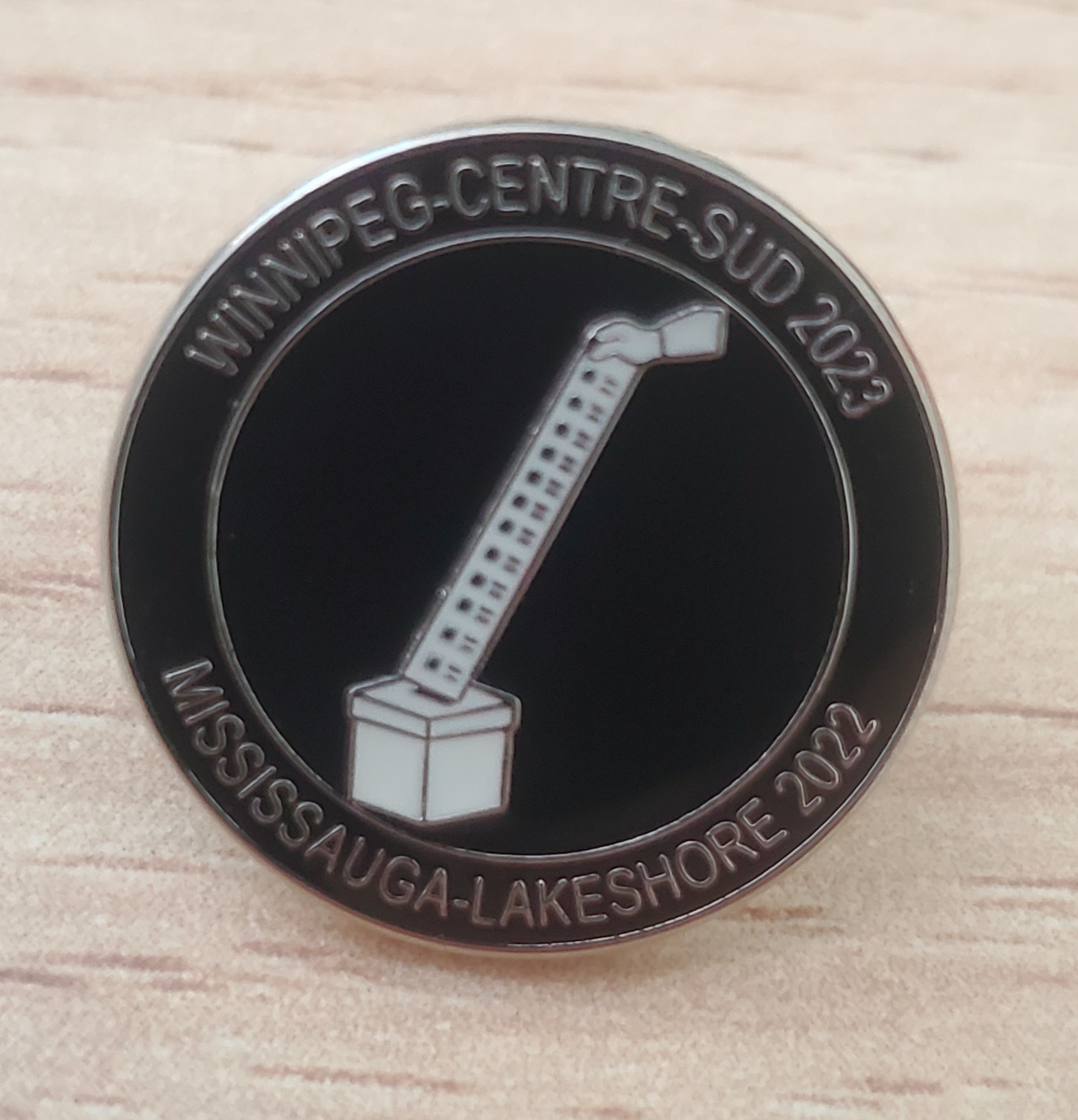
Commemorative pin given to candidates in the 2022 Mississauga—Lakeshore and 2023 Winnipeg South Centre by-elections

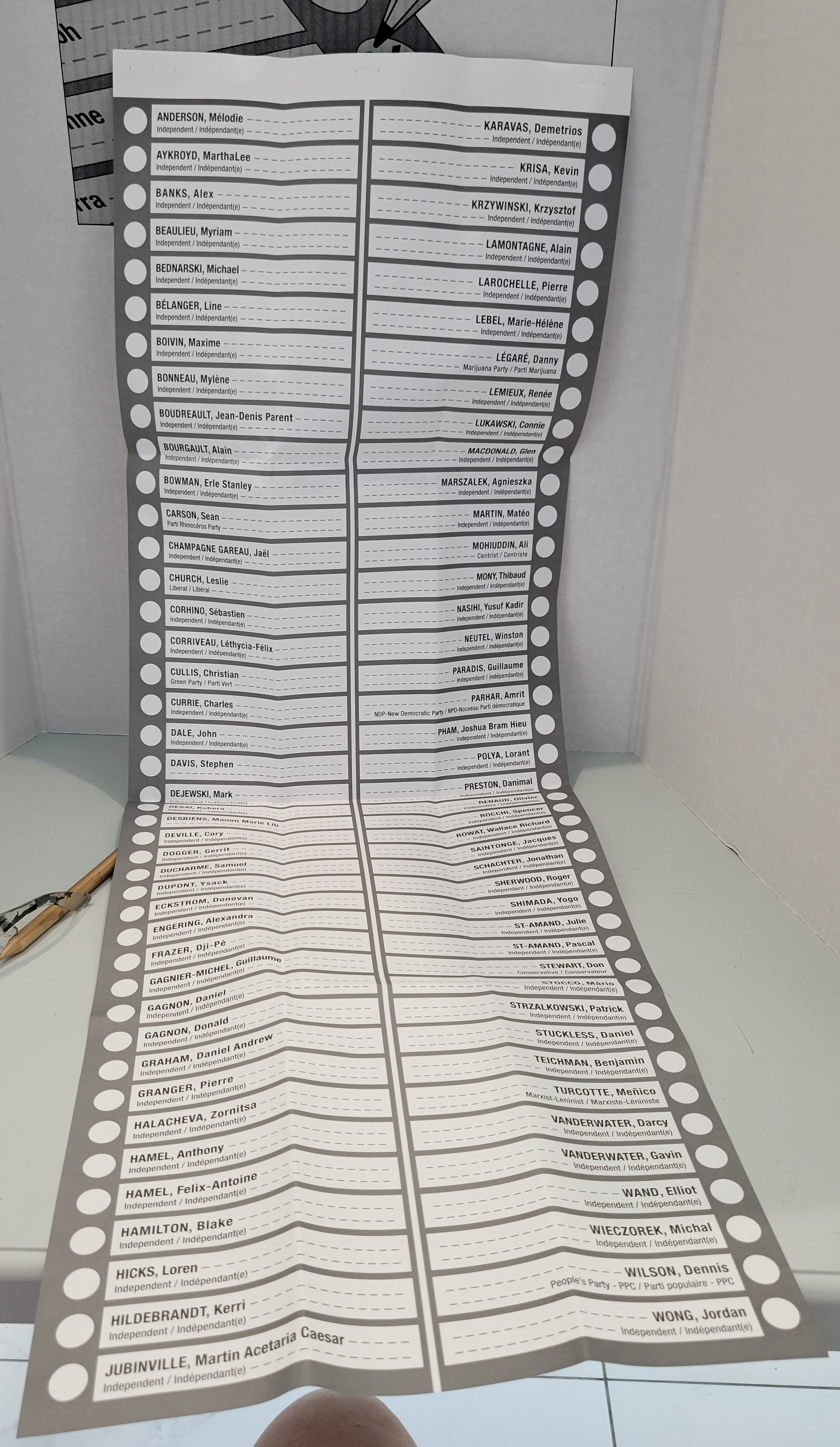
Ballot for the 2024 Toronto—St. Paul's by-election

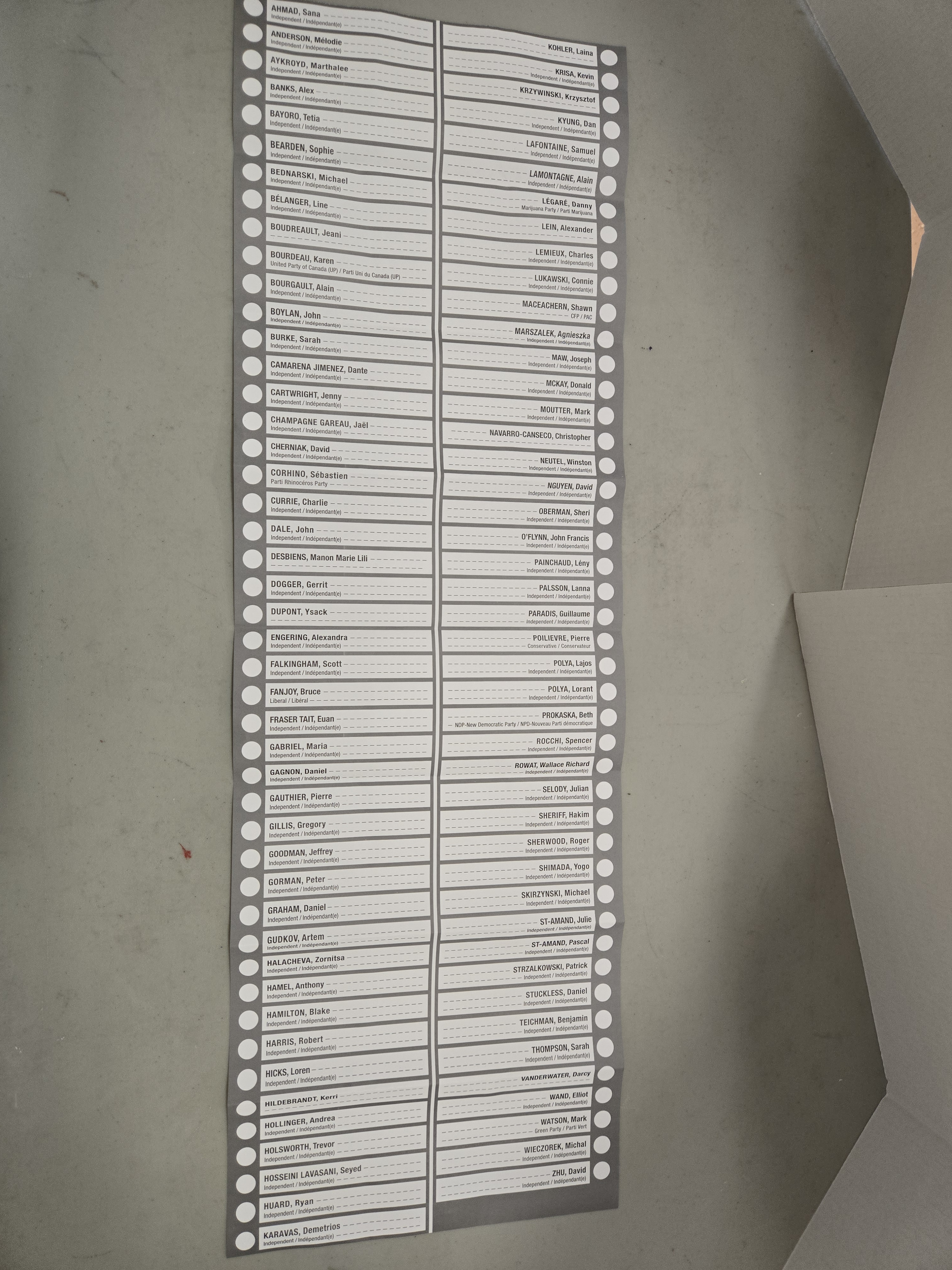
Ballot for the 2025 Canadian federal election (Carleton)

== See also ==
- Canadian electoral system
- Elections in Canada
- Fair Vote Canada
