= Grant Abraham =

Canadian politician

Leader of the Reforge Party
- Incumbent
- Assumed office 15 December 2023
- Preceded by: Position established

Personal details
- Born: Alberta, Canada
- Citizenship: Canadian
- Party: Reforge Party (2023-present)
- Other political affiliations: Northern Ireland Conservatives (2019); Conservative Party of Canada (2022-2023)
- Spouse: Caroline Abraham
- Children: 4
- Education: Trinity Western University (Bachelor's degree in business and English); Queen's University Belfast (Degree in law)
- Occupation: Politician
- Known for: Founding the Reforge Party

Grant Abraham is a Canadian politician who founded the Reforge Party (formerly known as the United Party of Canada) in 2023.

== Early life ==
Abraham was born in Alberta, Canada and raised in British Columbia. He received his bachelor's degree in business and English at Trinity Western University and received his degree in law from Queen's University Belfast.

== Political career ==
Abraham ran as a candidate for the Northern Ireland Conservatives in Strangford in the 2019 United Kingdom general election but failed to get elected.

Later, Abraham attempted to run in the 2022 Conservative Party of Canada leadership election but was deemed to be ineligible. Despite both Abraham and media outlets asking the Conservative Party of Canada why he was deemed to be ineligible, neither received any reply. Later it was reported that Abraham's campaign was deemed ineligible due to a failure of meeting both the entry fee costs and required amount of signatures from within the Conservative party.

In December 2023, Abraham founded the United Party of Canada. The party became officially registered with Elections Canada on 6 February 2024.

== Political positions ==
=== Foreign policy ===
Abraham's ideology has been described by outside observers as being right-wing, religiously centred, and anti-globalist. Abraham holds pro-Republican views and has stated that his party would hold a constitutional review in order to create a "peaceful pathway" to turning Canada into a constitutional republic which would place it "under the supremacy of God and the rule of law." Abraham has also stated that if elected, his party would withdraw Canada from the World Health Organization, the Paris Agreement, and the United Nations's economic and military initiatives.

=== Immigration ===
Abraham has stated on his party's website that if elected, his government would deport all illegal immigrants, visa overstayers and failed asylum seekers while using the Canadian Armed Forces to prevent illegal border crossings. He also states that his party would end birthright citizenship for children born to non-Canadians. In terms of foreign students, Abraham stated that his party would cut eliminate work permits for foreign students and require foreign students to fund themselves rather than receive government welfare.

=== Other positions ===
Abraham is against abortion unless the mother's life is on the line.

Abraham supports freedom of thought and freedom of religion.

== Personal life ==
Abraham is a Christian. He is married and has four sons with his wife Caroline. His family currently lives in Calgary.

== Electoral history ==
=== Federal elections ===
==== United Kingdom ====
2019 general election: Strangford
| Party | Candidate | Votes | % | ±% |
|---|---|---|---|---|
| DUP | Jim Shannon | 17,705 | 47.2 | −14.8 |
| Alliance | Kellie Armstrong | 10,634 | 28.4 | +13.7 |
| UUP | Phillip Smith | 4,023 | 10.7 | −0.7 |
| SDLP | Joe Boyle | 1,994 | 5.3 | −0.9 |
| NI Conservatives | Grant Abraham | 1,476 | 3.9 | +2.6 |
| Green (NI) | Maurice Macartney | 790 | 2.1 | +0.5 |
| Sinn Féin | Ryan Carlin | 555 | 1.5 | −1.3 |
| UKIP | Robert Stephenson | 308 | 0.8 | New |
| Majority | | 7,071 | 18.8 | −28.5 |
| Turnout | | 37,485 | 56.0 | −4.4 |
| Registered electors | | 66,938 | | |
| DUP hold | | Swing | −14.3 | |

==== Canada ====
2025 Canadian federal election: Ponoka—Didsbury
| Party | Candidate | Votes | % | ±% | Expenditures |
|---|---|---|---|---|---|
| Conservative | Blaine Calkins | 56,106 | 81.81 | +13.94 | $38,502.44 |
| New Democratic | Logan Hooley | 7,414 | 10.81 | –0.14 | $831.38 |
| United | Grant Abraham | 2,129 | 3.10 | – | $86,351.67 |
| No affiliation | Zarnab Zafar (Note: Zafar is endorsed by the Liberal Party of Canada, which stated her party affiliation was not registered due to a clerical error with Elections Canada.) | 1,641 | 2.39 | +1.76 | |
| People's | Larry Gratton | 1,289 | 1.88 | –11.48 | $4,011.60 |
| Total valid votes/expense limit | | 68,579 | 99.20 | – | $140,540.79 |
| Total rejected ballots | | 552 | 0.80 | – | |
| Turnout | | 69,131 | 75.13 | – | |
| Eligible voters | | 92,020 | | | |
| Conservative notional hold | | Swing | | +7.04 | |
Source: Elections Canada

=== By-elections ===
Canadian federal by-election, March 4, 2024: Durham Resignation of Erin O'Toole
| Party | Candidate | Votes | % | ±% |
|---|---|---|---|---|
| Conservative | Jamil Jivani | 18,610 | 57.44 | +11.04 |
| Liberal | Robert Rock | 7,285 | 22.48 | –7.44 |
| New Democratic | Chris Borgia | 3,363 | 10.38 | –7.14 |
| People's | Patricia Conlin | 1,435 | 4.43 | –1.07 |
| Green | Kevin MacKenzie | 698 | 2.15 | |
| Independent | Pranay Gunti | 374 | 1.15 | |
| Centrist | Khalid Qureshi | 336 | 1.04 | |
| United | Grant Abraham | 238 | 0.73 | |
| Rhinoceros | Adam Smith | 62 | 0.19 | –0.03 |
| Total valid votes | | 32,401 | | |
| Total rejected ballots | | | | |
| Turnout | | 32,401 | 27.87 | –33.32 |
| Eligible voters | | 116,259 | | |
| Conservative hold | | Swing | | +9.24 |
Source: Elections Canada

Canadian federal by-election, August 18, 2025: Battle River—Crowfoot Resignation of Damien Kurek
| Party | Candidate | Votes | % | ±% |
|---|---|---|---|---|
| Conservative | Pierre Poilievre | 41,308 | 80.86 | -1.98 |
| Independent | Bonnie Critchley | 5,018 | 9.82 | – |
| Liberal | Darcy Spady | 2,095 | 4.10 | -7.57 |
| New Democratic | Katherine Swampy | 1,061 | 2.08 | -1.10 |
| United | Grant Abraham | 757 | 1.48 | – |
| People's | Jonathan Bridges | 138 | 0.27 | -1.31 |
| Green | Ashley MacDonald | 116 | 0.23 | -0.50 |
| Libertarian | Michael Harris | 103 | 0.20 | – |
| Christian Heritage | Jeff Willerton | 92 | 0.18 | – |
| Independent | Sarah Spanier | 49 | 0.10 | – |
| Marijuana | Kenneth Kirk | 40 | 0.08 | – |
| Centrist | Ahmed Hassan | 15 | 0.03 | – |
| Independent | Bert William Westergard | 11 | 0.02 | – |
| Independent | Breccan Zimmer | 11 | 0.02 | – |
| Independent | Dillon Anderson | 10 | 0.02 | – |
| Independent | Nicole Betts | 7 | 0.01 | – |
| Independent | Nickolas Meuters-Murphy | 7 | 0.01 | – |
| Independent | Diane Prentice | 7 | 0.01 | – |
| Independent | Glen Armstrong | 6 | 0.01 | – |
| Independent | Caitlyn Baker | 6 | 0.01 | – |
| Independent | Lisa Parsons | 6 | 0.01 | – |
| Independent | Jason Buzzell | 5 | 0.01 | – |
| Independent | Jenny Cartwright | 5 | 0.01 | – |
| Independent | Deborah Chalmers | 5 | 0.01 | – |
| Independent | William Grant | 5 | 0.01 | – |
| Independent | Paul Jones | 5 | 0.01 | – |
| Independent | Brennen Perry | 5 | 0.01 | – |
| Independent | Anthony Perullo | 5 | 0.01 | – |
| Independent | Myles René Laurent St. Pierre | 5 | 0.01 | – |
| Independent | Fraser Anderson | 4 | 0.01 | – |
| Independent | Rebecca Boyce | 4 | 0.01 | – |
| Independent | Pierre Gauthier | 4 | 0.01 | – |
| Independent | Preston Hoff | 4 | 0.01 | – |
| Independent | Mark Ruthenberg | 4 | 0.01 | – |
| Independent | Ceilidh Stewart | 4 | 0.01 | – |
| Independent | Danica Boe | 3 | 0.01 | – |
| Independent | Aaron Bowles | 3 | 0.01 | – |
| Independent | Sarah Burke | 3 | 0.01 | – |
| Independent | David Cherniak | 3 | 0.01 | – |
| Independent | John Dale | 3 | 0.01 | – |
| Independent | Emily Goose | 3 | 0.01 | – |
| Independent | Corey Hales | 3 | 0.01 | – |
| Independent | Grace Pender | 3 | 0.01 | – |
| Independent | Noah Reid | 3 | 0.01 | – |
| Independent | David Sader | 3 | 0.01 | – |
| Independent | Molly Sun | 3 | 0.01 | – |
| Independent | Nicola Zoghbi | 3 | 0.01 | – |
| Independent | Alex Banks | 2 | 0.00 | – |
| Independent | Stacy Lynn Billingsley | 2 | 0.00 | – |
| Independent | Marten Borch | 2 | 0.00 | – |
| Independent | Jakeb Brown | 2 | 0.00 | – |
| Independent | Annelies Cooper | 2 | 0.00 | – |
| Independent | Hannah DeWolfe | 2 | 0.00 | – |
| Independent | Elizabeth Dupuis | 2 | 0.00 | – |
| Independent | Kenneth Durham | 2 | 0.00 | – |
| Independent | Michael Dyck | 2 | 0.00 | – |
| Independent | Katherine Dyson | 2 | 0.00 | – |
| Independent | Michael Louis Fitzgerald | 2 | 0.00 | – |
| Independent | Daniel Gagnon | 2 | 0.00 | – |
| Independent | Kerri Hildebrandt | 2 | 0.00 | – |
| Independent | Elsie Kipp | 2 | 0.00 | – |
| Independent | Chris Kowalchuk | 2 | 0.00 | – |
| Independent | Johnson Hon Wa Lee | 2 | 0.00 | – |
| Independent | Maria Light | 2 | 0.00 | – |
| Independent | Derek Adam MacKay | 2 | 0.00 | – |
| Independent | Jeffrey McLean | 2 | 0.00 | – |
| Independent | Riley Moss | 2 | 0.00 | – |
| Independent | Kimberley Nugent | 2 | 0.00 | – |
| Independent | Alexander Panchuk | 2 | 0.00 | – |
| Independent | Yagya Parihar | 2 | 0.00 | – |
| Independent | Samuel Pignedoli | 2 | 0.00 | – |
| Independent | Lorant Polya | 2 | 0.00 | – |
| Independent | Jayson Roy | 2 | 0.00 | – |
| Independent | Adam Smith | 2 | 0.00 | – |
| Independent | Patrick Strzalkowski | 2 | 0.00 | – |
| Independent | Callan Wassenaar | 2 | 0.00 | – |
| Independent | Jeremy Wedel | 2 | 0.00 | – |
| Independent | Hazel Westwood | 2 | 0.00 | – |
| Independent | Nicholas Ashmore | 1 | 0.00 | – |
| Independent | Michael Bednarski | 1 | 0.00 | – |
| Independent | Lilia Boisvert | 1 | 0.00 | – |
| Independent | Alain Bourgault | 1 | 0.00 | – |
| Independent | Eva Bowering | 1 | 0.00 | – |
| Independent | Joshua Brauner | 1 | 0.00 | – |
| Independent | Alexandre Brochu | 1 | 0.00 | – |
| Independent | Chun Chen | 1 | 0.00 | – |
| Independent | Shawn Clendining | 1 | 0.00 | – |
| Independent | Lindsay Elaine Shyla Colosimo | 1 | 0.00 | – |
| Independent | Dylan Colquhoun | 1 | 0.00 | – |
| Independent | Jayson Cowan | 1 | 0.00 | – |
| Independent | Michael Davis | 1 | 0.00 | – |
| Independent | Geneviève Dorval | 1 | 0.00 | – |
| Independent | Jordan Drew | 1 | 0.00 | – |
| Independent | Murray Dunham | 1 | 0.00 | – |
| Independent | Eric Duong | 1 | 0.00 | – |
| Independent | Mark Eccleston | 1 | 0.00 | – |
| Independent | Jeremy Edwards | 1 | 0.00 | – |
| Independent | Allison Fanjoy | 1 | 0.00 | – |
| Independent | Gabriel Finn | 1 | 0.00 | – |
| Independent | Hubert Fischer | 1 | 0.00 | – |
| Independent | Matthew Gillies | 1 | 0.00 | – |
| Independent | Peter Gorman | 1 | 0.00 | – |
| Independent | Jacqueline Grabowski | 1 | 0.00 | – |
| Independent | Andrew Guenther | 1 | 0.00 | – |
| Independent | Blake Hamilton | 1 | 0.00 | – |
| Independent | Jason Hodgson | 1 | 0.00 | – |
| Independent | Dakota Hourie | 1 | 0.00 | – |
| Independent | Uneeb Islam | 1 | 0.00 | – |
| Independent | Michael Jones | 1 | 0.00 | – |
| Independent | Richard Kenkel | 1 | 0.00 | – |
| Independent | Madison Kennedy | 1 | 0.00 | – |
| Independent | Abraham Lau | 1 | 0.00 | – |
| Independent | Charles Lemieux | 1 | 0.00 | – |
| Independent | Robert Marsden | 1 | 0.00 | – |
| Independent | Agnieszka Marszalek | 1 | 0.00 | – |
| Independent | Geoffrey Meens | 1 | 0.00 | – |
| Independent | Sophia Nguyen | 1 | 0.00 | – |
| Independent | Pascal Noël | 1 | 0.00 | – |
| Independent | Steve Oates | 1 | 0.00 | – |
| Independent | Lény Painchaud | 1 | 0.00 | – |
| Independent | Lanna Palsson | 1 | 0.00 | – |
| Independent | Céline Paquin | 1 | 0.00 | – |
| Independent | Meagan Roberge | 1 | 0.00 | – |
| Independent | Melanie Roberge | 1 | 0.00 | – |
| Independent | Mark Russell | 1 | 0.00 | – |
| Independent | Kayll Schaefer | 1 | 0.00 | – |
| Independent | Hakim Sheriff | 1 | 0.00 | – |
| Independent | Eric Shorten | 1 | 0.00 | – |
| Independent | Bradley Stewart | 1 | 0.00 | – |
| Independent | Mário Stocco | 1 | 0.00 | – |
| Independent | Faith Tabladillo | 1 | 0.00 | – |
| Independent | Alex Vallée | 1 | 0.00 | – |
| Independent | Dennis Vanmeer | 1 | 0.00 | – |
| Independent | Bryan Wang | 1 | 0.00 | – |
| Independent | Joshua Wong | 1 | 0.00 | – |
| Independent | Yao ZhangLi | 1 | 0.00 | – |
| Independent | David Zhu | 1 | 0.00 | – |
| Independent | Barry Zukewich | 1 | 0.00 | – |
| Independent | Marthalee Aykroyd | 0 | 0.00 | – |
| Independent | Line Bélanger | 0 | 0.00 | – |
| Independent | Michel Bélanger | 0 | 0.00 | – |
| Independent | Jeani Boudreault | 0 | 0.00 | – |
| Independent | Jeffery Brazeau | 0 | 0.00 | – |
| Independent | Bo Cai | 0 | 0.00 | – |
| Independent | Cameron Campos | 0 | 0.00 | – |
| Independent | Nicolas Champagne | 0 | 0.00 | – |
| Independent | Jaël Champagne Gareau | 0 | 0.00 | – |
| Independent | Claude Cordon Pichilla | 0 | 0.00 | – |
| Independent | Tristan Dell | 0 | 0.00 | – |
| Independent | Gerrit Dogger | 0 | 0.00 | – |
| Independent | Abel Erazo-Ibarra | 0 | 0.00 | – |
| Independent | Tracy Farber | 0 | 0.00 | – |
| Independent | Brian Farrenkopf | 0 | 0.00 | – |
| Independent | Thomas Fitzgerald | 0 | 0.00 | – |
| Independent | Connor Fullerton | 0 | 0.00 | – |
| Independent | Jordan Gerrard | 0 | 0.00 | – |
| Independent | Eric Gilmour | 0 | 0.00 | – |
| Independent | Laurie Goble | 0 | 0.00 | – |
| Independent | David Patrick Greene | 0 | 0.00 | – |
| Independent | Nicolette Gross | 0 | 0.00 | – |
| Independent | Kathleen Gudmundsson | 0 | 0.00 | – |
| Independent | Richard Haley | 0 | 0.00 | – |
| Independent | Kazimir Haykowsky | 0 | 0.00 | – |
| Independent | Iriella Hicks | 0 | 0.00 | – |
| Independent | Loren Hicks | 0 | 0.00 | – |
| Independent | Seyed Hosseini Lavasani | 0 | 0.00 | – |
| Independent | Glendyn Howse | 0 | 0.00 | – |
| Independent | Ryan Huard | 0 | 0.00 | – |
| Independent | Jack Jean-Louis | 0 | 0.00 | – |
| Independent | Derek Jouppi | 0 | 0.00 | – |
| Independent | Erich Jurgens | 0 | 0.00 | – |
| Independent | Elza Kephart | 0 | 0.00 | – |
| Independent | Dannielle Konkle | 0 | 0.00 | – |
| Independent | Solomon Krygier-Paine | 0 | 0.00 | – |
| Independent | Andrew Kulas | 0 | 0.00 | – |
| Independent | Samuel Lafontaine | 0 | 0.00 | – |
| Independent | Alain Lamontagne | 0 | 0.00 | – |
| Independent | Eric Laverdure | 0 | 0.00 | – |
| Independent | Jocelyn LeBlanc-Courchaine | 0 | 0.00 | – |
| Independent | Alexander Lein | 0 | 0.00 | – |
| Independent | Renée Lemieux | 0 | 0.00 | – |
| Independent | Jeffrey Leroux | 0 | 0.00 | – |
| Independent | Litma Kai Ching Leung | 0 | 0.00 | – |
| Independent | Cedric Ludlow | 0 | 0.00 | – |
| Independent | Jennifer Margaret Mackenzie-Miller | 0 | 0.00 | – |
| Independent | Nicolas Maltais | 0 | 0.00 | – |
| Independent | Kevin Manzano | 0 | 0.00 | – |
| Independent | Eric March | 0 | 0.00 | – |
| Independent | Devin McManus | 0 | 0.00 | – |
| Independent | Robert Melting Tallow | 0 | 0.00 | – |
| Independent | Joanne L Metters | 0 | 0.00 | – |
| Independent | Nicholas Mew | 0 | 0.00 | – |
| Independent | Mark Moutter | 0 | 0.00 | – |
| Independent | Rob Mumford | 0 | 0.00 | – |
| Independent | Molly Munn | 0 | 0.00 | – |
| Independent | Sam Nabi | 0 | 0.00 | – |
| Independent | John Francis O'Flynn | 0 | 0.00 | – |
| Independent | Clifford Pine | 0 | 0.00 | – |
| Independent | Brian Ramchandar | 0 | 0.00 | – |
| Independent | Spencer Rocchi | 0 | 0.00 | – |
| Independent | Wallace Richard Rowat | 0 | 0.00 | – |
| Independent | Barry Rueger | 0 | 0.00 | – |
| Independent | Chris Scrimes | 0 | 0.00 | – |
| Independent | Charles Douglas Sleep | 0 | 0.00 | – |
| Independent | Julie St-Amand | 0 | 0.00 | – |
| Independent | Pascal St-Amand | 0 | 0.00 | – |
| Independent | Andi Sweet | 0 | 0.00 | – |
| Independent | Corinne Unrau | 0 | 0.00 | – |
| Independent | Tyson Warner | 0 | 0.00 | – |
| Independent | Simon John Edwin Wedel | 0 | 0.00 | – |
| Independent | Michaiah Williams | 0 | 0.00 | – |
| Independent | Brian Wishart | 0 | 0.00 | – |
| Independent | Michael Wisniewski | 0 | 0.00 | – |
| Independent | Belinda Christine Young | 0 | 0.00 | – |
| Total valid votes | | 51,085 | 99.59 | – |
| Total rejected ballots | | 211 | 0.41 | -0.19 |
| Turnout | | 51,296 | 59.83 | -16.66 |
| Eligible voters | | 85,736 | – | |
| Conservative hold | | Swing | | – |
Source: Elections Canada
