= Jamil Jivani =

Canadian politician and lawyer (born 1987)

Jamil Jivani MP
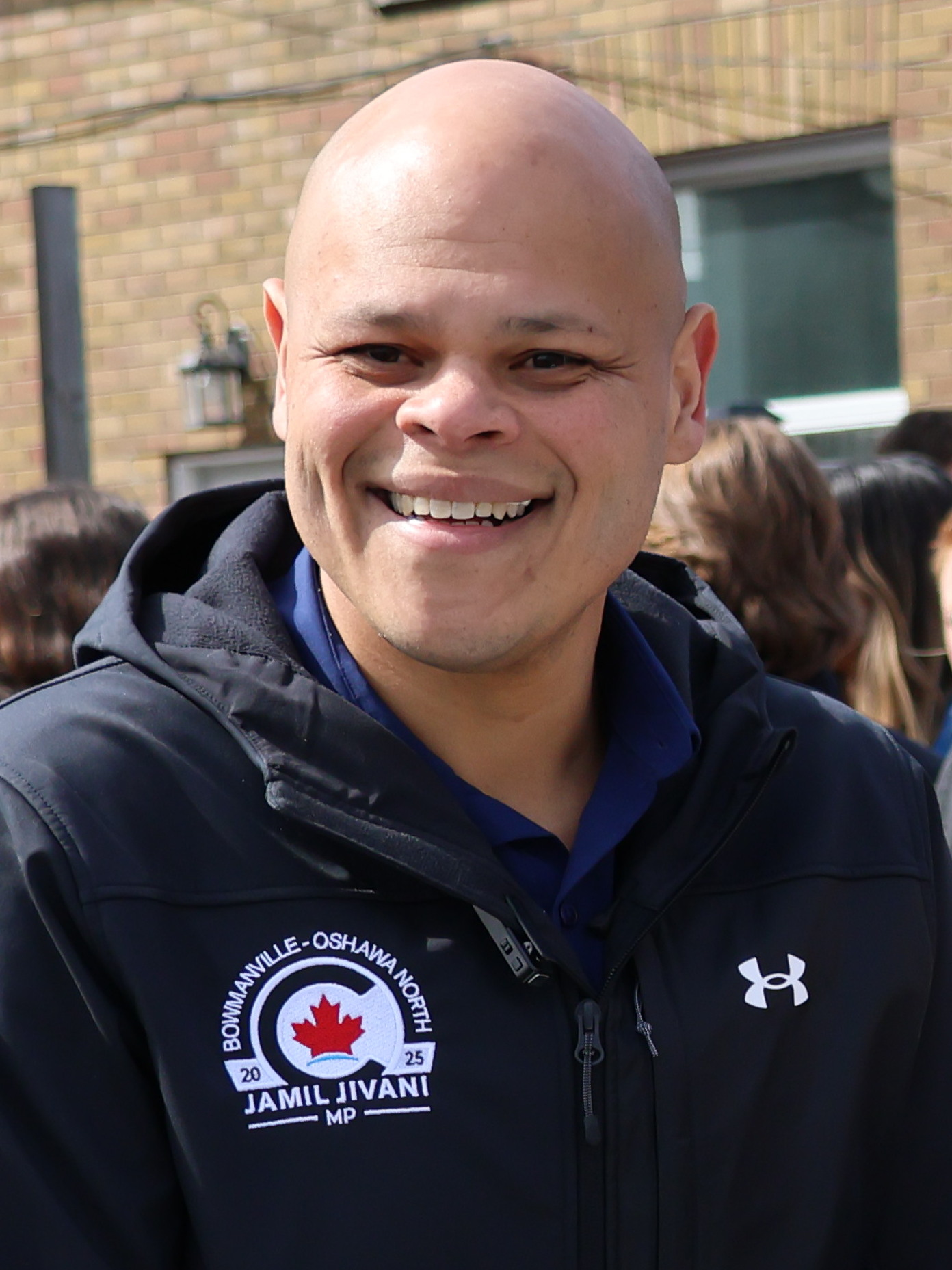
- Jivani in 2025

Member of Parliament for Bowmanville—Oshawa North Durham (2024–2025)
- Incumbent
- Assumed office March 4, 2024
- Preceded by: Erin O'Toole

Personal details
- Born: October 24, 1987 (age 39) Toronto, Ontario, Canada
- Party: Conservative
- Other political affiliations: Liberal (former)
- Education: Humber College; York University (BA); Yale University (JD)
- Website: Official website

Jamil Jivani (born October 24, 1987) is a Canadian politician who has been a member of Parliament (MP) since 2024. A member of the Conservative Party, Jivani represents Bowmanville—Oshawa North. He was first elected to represent Durham in a 2024 by-election triggered by the resignation of former Conservative leader and leader of the Official Opposition Erin O'Toole.

Before entering politics, Jivani studied law at Yale University. He practiced corporate law at Torys LLP, worked as a community-police relations activist, was a contributor for Postmedia and hosted a radio show on CFRB Newstalk 1010. He previously worked as a special advisor to the premier of Ontario, Doug Ford, and was appointed as the advocate for community opportunities and to the Premier's Council on Equality of Opportunity.

== Early life and education ==
Jivani was born in Toronto, Ontario, to a Kenyan Muslim father and a Christian mother of Scottish and Irish descent. His father was adopted and raised by a Muslim Indian family, hence the Indian surname. He grew up with his two sisters, raised by their mother in Brampton, Ontario. Jivani also has two stepbrothers through his father's side. After attending Fletcher’s Creek Senior Public School, then Mississauga's Gordon Graydon Memorial Secondary School, Jivani attended Humber College and York University.

In 2013, he earned his Juris Doctor from Yale Law School. Before attending law school, Jivani worked as a dishwasher and line cook in local Toronto area restaurants. While a student at Yale, Jivani was Program Director of the Yale Chapter of the Marshall-Brennan Constitutional Literacy Project and President of the Yale Black Law Students Association. He was also part of the Innovations in Policing Clinic, in which he authored a case study of police-community relations in Milwaukee, Wisconsin.

Jivani also interned at the office of Cory Booker, the then-mayor of Newark, and current Democratic Senior United States Senator from New Jersey. Jivani later revealed in 2020 that for a few years after law school, he was a card-carrying member of the Liberal Party of Canada.

=== Relationship with JD Vance ===
At Yale, he became the best friend and a classmate of future Republican Vice President of the United States, JD Vance. Between 2016 until it closed in 2018, Jivani helped run the charity organization Our Ohio Renewal, founded by Vance; Jivani later stated the group's work was derailed because of his cancer diagnosis. In January 2026, he visited Washington, D.C. and met with Vance amid the 2025–26 United States trade war with Canada; Jivani also stated that he spoke with U.S. president Donald Trump during the visit. Other members of the Conservative caucus expressed concerns about what they saw as "freelance diplomacy." In a speech given to donors at an event in Southhampton, New York. U.S. Vice President JD Vance referred to Jivani as a "pretty effective advocate"

"But the quiet sort of behind-the-scenes story is that this, like, random MP who has a good relationship with us has been a pretty effective advocate," - U.S. Vice President JD Vance. Wednesday, August 19, 2026.

== Early career ==
=== Activism ===
As a teenager, he participated in the Five Percent Nation, a radical group, by attending online and in person meetings.

In 2013, Jivani founded the Policing Literacy Initiative (PLI), a youth-driven public education and advocacy group focused on community safety issues. Jivani stated to CBC Metro Morning that the purpose of PLI is to spotlight progressive voices among police and community groups and work with them to find common solutions. Jivani wrote an editorial for the National Post in February 2014 about his experience with Toronto Police and the Office of the Independent Police Review Director and the use of mediated conversations for citizen complaints. In April 2014, Jivani co-produced with Dan Epstein a documentary about police-community relations titled "Crisis of Distrust: Police and Community in Toronto."

Jivani was a 2013–14 Greater Toronto CivicAction Alliance DiverseCity Fellow. As a Fellow, he co-founded Teachers Beyond the Classroom, which seeks to "help thousands of unemployed teachers transfer their skills to non-school employment opportunities across the Greater Toronto Area." He served on the Board of Directors of the Children's Aid Society of Toronto until 2017. On February 13, 2014, Jivani was named Yale Alumni Magazine's Newsmaker of the Week.

=== Legal career ===
Following his graduation from Yale, he practised corporate law at Torys LLP. Jivani held research and teaching appointments at Osgoode Hall Law School.

External videos
- After Words interview with Jivani on Why Young Men, July 6, 2019, C-SPAN

=== Think Tank Fellow ===
In 2020, he was appointed senior fellow for Diversity and Empowerment at the Macdonald-Laurier Institute, a conservative, libertarian think tank affiliated with the US Atlas Network. His association with the Institute ended in 2023. He later became president of the Canada Strong and Free Network, but stepped down to announce his candidacy for the Conservative nomination in Durham.

=== Punditry and dismissal from Bell ===
He has written about youth and equality issues for Huffington Post. and has articles published frequently in Postmedia chains.

On September 8, 2020, Bell Media announced that Jamil Jivani would host a new weekday nightly radio talk show Tonight with Jamil Jivani, from 10:00 PM – 11:00 PM. The show would air on CFRB and across the iHeart Radio Network. In February 2021, Bell Media went under a corporate restructuring within its radio division. It was announced Jamil Jivani would move to the 7:00 PM – 10:00 PM time slot and his show would be rebranded as The Jamil Jivani Show.

Jivani was later fired from Bell Media, which he claimed was due to him not conforming to Black stereotypes. In August 2022, Jamil Jivani sued Bell Media for wrongful dismissal and breach of contract. Bell filed a statement of defence, claiming that Jivani was let go because he showed disdain for concerns raised by Bell management over issues such as avoiding pushing back against COVID-19 misinformation and misgendering Demi Lovato.

== Political career ==
=== Ontario government adviser ===
On December 11, 2019, the Ontario government appointed Jivani as the province's first Advocate for Community Opportunities and a special adviser to the premier. His responsibilities included liaising between communities and the government and facilitating public participation in government decision-making. Critics, such as his former mentor Neil Price, felt that Jivani used his role to criticize the communities that he was supposed to uplift. He was reappointed on April 1, 2022, but resigned on June 9 after criticizing Education Minister Stephen Lecce on social media over the closure of schools and vaccine passports during the COVID-19 pandemic in Ontario.

=== Federal politics ===
Jivani moderated the first unofficial debate during the 2022 Conservative Party of Canada leadership election where he took aim at Patrick Brown, who skipped the debate by arguing that he was manipulating diaspora politics to boost his campaign. An official working for Brown said that the party should welcome new Canadians to the party.

==== Election to Parliament ====
On April 20, 2023, Jivani announced that he would run for the Conservative nomination in Durham riding, following the resignation of Erin O'Toole. On August 20, 2023, he won the nomination race, defeating Theresa Corless, a former Durham Catholic School Board chair.

In a by-election held on March 4, 2024, he was elected to the Canadian House of Commons as a Conservative for the Ontario riding of Durham.

==== Restore the North ====
On September 6, 2025, Jivani announced the launch of the Restore the North, a national initiative trying to get young Canadian men to participate in politics. On October 3, 2025, Jivani announced the launch of a Restore the North Campus Tour which are modelled after the Turning Point USA campus tours which were led by Charlie Kirk. These tours have been described as part debate, part rally, and part recruitment drive. Jivani has stated that he wants to expand the movement by igniting a national conversation aimed at addressing policy gaps to help young men.

==== Canada–United States relations ====
In February 2026, Global News reported that two Conservative sources said some caucus members were unhappy with Jivani's independent diplomacy with the Trump administration. Following Jivani's characterization of Canada's response to the United States as an "anti-America hissy fit", Pierre Poilievre publicly disagreed, saying Canadians had legitimate concerns about American tariffs and Trump's comments. Poilievre said he had spoken with Jivani and that the MP spoke for himself rather than the party, while also encouraging MPs to use their connections to oppose American tariffs.

In August 2026, JD Vance praised Jivani's involvement in trade discussions while dismissing Poilievre's role. Conservative strategist Tim Powers argued that Jivani's activities were undermining Poilievre and criticized his approach to working with the party. Asked about Vance's remarks, Poilievre said he had encouraged Conservative MPs to use their American connections to advocate for tariff-free trade.

In September 2026, Jivani posted a video criticizing those he said should be offering an alternative to the Liberals but were instead appeasing people in power. Although he did not name Poilievre, former Conservative cabinet minister Jason Kenney accused him of detracting from the leader's concurrent visit to the United States. CBC News also reported that Conservative MP Kyle Seeback had criticized Jivani's opposition to reciprocal tariffs, which had featured in the party's 2025 election platform. Seeback said Jivani spoke only for himself in a social media post that he subsequently deleted.

Jivani has rejected characterizations of himself as a supporter of Donald Trump, saying that his involvement in Canada–United States relations was intended to help Canada. He said he had privately offered to assist Dominic LeBlanc with trade negotiations, but had received only an acknowledgement of his offer.

=== Relations with Doug Ford ===
Jivani's victory speech criticized "the liberal elites who run the Ontario Ministry of Education in this province". When asked by reporters, Education Minister Stephen Lecce dismissed Jivani's comments as his concern. While Progressive Conservative Premier Doug Ford responded to Jivani's comments by stating that while he wished the best for Jivani, Ford believed that he helped launch Jivani's career.

After Lecce was shuffled out of education portfolio, Jivani referred to it as "a great day" for education. Nick Kouvalis, a political operative associated with Doug Ford responded that Jivani had "a wide berth" so far because of leader Pierre Poilievre and his advisor Jenni Byrne. He warned Jivani to watch his next moves since Lecce was under "his protection.

Upon re-election on April 28, 2025, Jivani revisited his criticism of Ford during a post-victory interview with the CBC, in which he dismissed Ford's political acumen and called him an "opportunist", stating that Ford "has taken the provincial conservatives and turned it into something hollow." Jivani later supported Project Ontario, an initiative to push Ford in a more conservative direction.

In October 2026, Jivani criticized Ford and Prime Minister Mark Carney over their handling of Canada–United States trade relations. He had also accused Ford of acting as a "hype-man" for the federal Liberals after the premier defended criticisms of the federal Conservatives' 2025 election campaign made by his campaign manager, Kory Teneycke.

Jivani has not ruled out seeking to become premier of Ontario and said he was undecided about running for re-election federally. He described his political focus as generational change. Calling Ford a "cautionary tale", Jivani accused him of abandoning conservatism to gain approval from liberals and attributed his electoral success to voter apathy and limited alternatives. Kory Teneycke responded that Jivani should concentrate on winning re-election, while Ford's pollster, Nick Kouvalis, argued that the provincial Progressive Conservatives were more popular in Ontario than their federal counterparts. Conservative MP Matt Strauss said losing Jivani from the federal caucus would be regrettable but that his entry into provincial politics would benefit Ontario.

== Political views ==
Jivani has been characterized as a Black conservative and a leading proponent of national conservatism in Canada. He has advocated for national conservative ideas about nationalism, the role of government, and race and Canada returning to the ideals of the Reform Party. Jivani has stated that his views were shaped by his father who abandoned his family when he was in elementary school by arguing that he was trying to find male role models.

=== Race and culture ===
Jivani views U.S. Supreme Court Justice Clarence Thomas as a trailblazer for diversity. Jivani has praised American rapper Kanye West and Alberta Premier Danielle Smith for standing up to what he sees as "cancel culture" after West was criticized for wearing a White Lives Matter shirt and Smith over her views about COVID-19.

In July 2020, Jivani supported the Government of Ontario decision to eliminate academic streaming in Grade 9 and most suspensions that impacted young students in the province. According to The Globe and Mail, he views Black Lives Matter movement as "anti-family fringe race activists" that hate the nuclear family and capitalism and has viewed the term “systemic racism" with skepticism. Jivani has suggested that terms such as "systemic racism" as well as "white privilege" have advanced critical race theory which he believes is an issue in Canada.

=== Crime and extremism ===
In March 2014, Jivani advocated for policy changes to the Toronto Police Services Board for police-community contacts and "carding." He argues that people's identity should not be the reason why they could be stopped by police. He has admitted to facing similar incidents. He is a critic of the defund the police movement arguing that they do not represent the "Black Community". However, he has advocated for criminal justice reform by admitting that police officers must treat people with respect, calling for mandating body cameras for police, and has praised then Toronto Police Chief Mark Saunders for attempting to reduce Toronto Police budget.

In his book, Why Young Men: Rage Race and the Crisis of Identity he suggested that poverty and lack of "validation in mainstream society" were factors behind the cause of crime. He also added in a later interview that lack of opportunity and inadequate social services as causes behind crime. A few years later, he blamed social media. He also suggested that the hip-hop industry, which he believes is galvanizing "gangster culture" should be investigated for "the role in causing crime." Previously in 2012, when writing for the Huffington Post, Jivani criticized then-Toronto Mayor Rob Ford and then immigration minister Jason Kenney for their remarks on the cause behind Toronto shootings as demeaning. When Ford suggested "immigration law" and Kenney suggested "foreign gangsters" as causes he argued that it was similar to tactics used by the Mitt Romney and criticized then Prime Minister Stephen Harper for failing to condemn them both.

Jivani praised federal NDP leader Jagmeet Singh, then-Minnesota Democratic congressman Keith Ellison, and University of Toronto professor of psychology, Jordan Peterson, as positive inspirations for young males to counter extremism.

=== Conservatism ===
Jivani previously described that he held liberal views for a few years after law school but departed from that philosophy as he grew older and considers conservatism as a form of counterculture. Even though he praised previous leader Erin O'Toole's character, he was critical of O'Toole not trying to appeal to the Conservative grassroots.

Jivani classified Quebec's Bill 96, which would provide most government and business services to be offered exclusively in French, as an example of national conservatism being implemented in Canada.

=== 'Free The Zyn' initiative ===
Jivani launched a petition that calls for the federal government to loosen restrictions on Nicotine pouches in Canada, as the vast majority of flavours and brands of Nicotine pouches are restricted or prohibited in Canada under the country's current laws and regulations.

== Books ==
Jivani contributed to the 2012 anthology, Jamaica in the Canadian Experience: A Multiculturalizing Presence, In 2018, he published Why Young Men: Rage, Race and the Crisis of Identity. The book was published by HarperCollins and listed for the Toronto Book Awards in 2018.

== Personal life ==
Jivani currently resides in Oshawa and is divorced from his ex-wife Maya.

== Electoral record ==
2025 Canadian federal election: Bowmanville—Oshawa North
Party	Candidate	Votes	%	±%	Expenditures
Conservative	Jamil Jivani	35,232	49.77	+5.02	$129,297.86
Liberal	Bridget Girard	32,214	45.51	+14.70	$66,627.20
New Democratic	Elenor Marano	2,032	2.87	−15.51	$0.00
Green	Julie Dietrich	546	0.77	N/A	$0.00
Independent	Pranay Gunti	264	0.37	N/A	$0.00
Christian Heritage	Thomas Zekveld	155	0.22	N/A	$3,845.80
United	Clint Cole	143	0.20	N/A	$4,091.90
Centrist	Ghuzna Imam	134	0.19	N/A	$0.00
Rhinoceros	Adam Smith	68	0.10	−0.11	$0.00
Total valid votes/expense limit		70,788	99.30	–	$144,962.39
Total rejected ballots		500	0.70	+0.02	
Turnout		71,288	69.67	+10.04	
Eligible voters		102,318			
Conservative notional hold		Swing		−4.84	
Source: Elections Canada

Canadian federal by-election, March 4, 2024: Durham Resignation of Erin O'Toole
Party	Candidate	Votes	%	±%
Conservative	Jamil Jivani	18,610	57.44	+11.04
Liberal	Robert Rock	7,285	22.48	–7.44
New Democratic	Chris Borgia	3,363	10.38	–7.14
People's	Patricia Conlin	1,435	4.43	–1.07
Green	Kevin MacKenzie	698	2.15	
Independent	Pranay Gunti	374	1.15	
Centrist	Khalid Qureshi	336	1.04	
United	Grant Abraham	238	0.73	
Rhinoceros	Adam Smith	62	0.19	–0.03
Total valid votes		32,401		
Total rejected ballots				
Turnout		32,401	27.87	–33.32
Eligible voters		116,259		
Conservative hold		Swing		+9.24
Source: Elections Canada
