= Bowmanville—Oshawa North =

Federal electoral district in Ontario, Canada

Ontario electoral district
- Interactive map of riding boundaries from the 2025 federal election

Federal electoral district
- Legislature: House of Commons
MP
Jamil Jivani
Conservative
- District created: 2023
- First contested: 2025
- Last contested: 2025

Demographics
- Population (2021): 128,534
- Electors (2025): 100,508
- Census division: Durham
- Census subdivision(s): Oshawa (part), Clarington (part)

Bowmanville—Oshawa North (French: Bowmanville–Oshawa-Nord) is a federal electoral district in Ontario, Canada. It came into effect upon the call of the 2025 Canadian federal election.

== Geography ==
The riding consists of the portion of Oshawa north of Taunton Road, and the portion of Clarington west of Darlington-Clarke Townline Road, including Bowmanville.

== Demographics ==
According to the 2021 Canadian census

Languages: 83.1% English, 2.1% French, 1.8% Tamil, 1.7% Urdu

Religions: 52.0% Christian (22.4% Catholic, 5.9% United Church, 4.3% Anglican, 2.1% Pentecostal, 1.4% Baptist, 1.4% Christian Orthodox, 1.1% Presbyterian, 13.4% Other), 35.5% No religion, 6.1% Muslim, 4.8% Hindu

Median income: $45,600 (2020)

Average income: $57,150 (2020)

Panethnic groups in Bowmanville—Oshawa North (2021)
Panethnic group	2021	
Panethnic group	Pop.	%
European (Note: Statistic includes all persons that did not make up part of a visible minority or an indigenous identity.)	87,820	68.72%
South Asian	13,810	10.81%
African	10,250	8.02%
East Asian (Note: Statistic includes total responses of "Chinese", "Korean", and "Japanese" under visible minority section on census.)	3,100	2.43%
Southeast Asian (Note: Statistic includes total responses of "Filipino" and "Southeast Asian" under visible minority section on census.)	2,940	2.3%
Indigenous	2,820	2.21%
Middle Eastern (Note: Statistic includes total responses of "West Asian" and "Arab" under visible minority section on census.)	2,775	2.17%
Latin American	1,245	0.97%
Other/multiracial (Note: Statistic includes total responses of "Visible minority, n.i.e." and "Multiple visible minorities" under visible minority section on census.)	3,030	2.37%
Total responses	127,785	99.42%
Total population	128,535	100%
Notes: Totals greater than 100% due to multiple origin responses. Demographics based on 2022 Canadian federal electoral redistribution riding boundaries.

== History ==
Parliament	Years	Member	Party
Bowmanville—Oshawa North; Riding created from Durham
45th	2025–present	Jamil Jivani	Conservative

== Electoral Results ==
2025 Canadian federal election
Party	Candidate	Votes	%	±%	Expenditures
Conservative	Jamil Jivani	35,232	49.77	+5.02	$129,297.86
Liberal	Bridget Girard	32,214	45.51	+14.70	$66,627.20
New Democratic	Elenor Marano	2,032	2.87	−15.51	$0.00
Green	Julie Dietrich	546	0.77	N/A	$0.00
Independent	Pranay Gunti	264	0.37	N/A	$0.00
Christian Heritage	Thomas Zekveld	155	0.22	N/A	$3,845.80
United	Clint Cole	143	0.20	N/A	$4,091.90
Centrist	Ghuzna Imam	134	0.19	N/A	$0.00
Rhinoceros	Adam Smith	68	0.10	−0.11	$0.00
Total valid votes/expense limit		70,788	99.30	–	$144,962.39
Total rejected ballots		500	0.70	+0.02	
Turnout		71,288	69.67	+10.04	
Eligible voters		102,318			
Conservative notional hold		Swing		−4.84	
Source: Elections Canada

2021 federal election redistributed results
Party	Vote	%
Conservative	24,668	44.75
Liberal	16,981	30.80
New Democratic	10,131	18.38
People's	2,982	5.41
Independents	249	0.45
Rhinoceros	116	0.21
Total valid votes	55,127	99.32
Rejected ballots	380	0.68
Registered voters/ estimated turnout	93,081	59.63

== See also ==
- List of Canadian electoral districts
