= Reforge Party =

Political party in Canada

- Leader: Grant Abraham
- Founder: Grant Abraham
- Founded: December 15, 2023
- Registered: February 6, 2024
- Split from: Conservative Party of Canada
- Headquarters: Calgary, Alberta
- Membership (2025): 400–500
- Ideology: Social conservatism Fiscal conservatism Republicanism; Federalism; Right-wing antiglobalism Christian right
- Political position: Right-wing
- Colours: Blue, Red

Website
- https://reforgeparty.ca/

The Reforge Party (formerly the United Party of Canada, UP) is a federal political party in Canada that sits on the right of the political spectrum. Founded by Grant Abraham, a former contender for the leadership of the Conservative Party of Canada, the party was founded in 2023 as the United Party of Canada. Described by Abraham as a "grassroots, fiscally conservative party" drawing on an ideological blend of the Conservatives and the former Reform Party of Canada, the party's stated policies centre around "family, security, prosperity, classic education, and religious freedom".

== History ==
=== Formation ===
Prior to the party's formation, Abraham unsuccessfully stood for election in the 2019 United Kingdom general election as the Northern Ireland Conservatives candidate for constituency of Strangford. Upon returning to Canada and joining the Conservative Party, he announced his candidacy for the party leadership after a motion of no confidence succeeded against then-leader Erin O'Toole. However, his campaign was disqualified on the grounds of failing to meet both the entry fee costs and required number of signatures from within the party. As a result, Abraham left the Conservatives and, in December 2023, established the United Party of Canada.

It became an eligible political party on December 15, 2023, and was officially registered with Elections Canada on February 6, 2024.

Abraham ran for the party in the 2024 Durham federal by-election.

=== 2025 Canadian Federal Election ===
During the 2025 Canadian federal election, the United Party of Canada ran 16 candidates out of the 343 ridings up for election. None won their seat.

=== 2025 Battle-River Crowfoot By-election ===
After Conservative Party leader and Leader of the Official Opposition Pierre Poilievre lost his riding of Carleton after a surge in the Liberal Party vote in the 2025 federal election, Conservative MP for Battle-River Crowfoot Damien Kurek resigned his seat in the House of Commons, triggering a by-election through which Poilievre would be able to re-enter parliament. Abraham announced his candidacy representing the United Party of Canada on June 12, 2025 and based his platform for the by-election around Alberta separatism. Out of the 214 candidates, Abraham finished 5th with 757 votes – 1.48% of the total votes cast.

=== 2026 Rebranding ===
In early 2026, the party filed with Elections Canada to change its name to Reforge Canada. The name change was speculated to be a nod to both the Reform Party of Canada, as well as the conservative, right-leaning Restore Britain and Reform UK movements.

== Policies ==
The Reforge Party has largely been described as right-wing, "religiously centred", anti-globalist alternative to the Conservative Party and the People's Party of Canada. According to the official party website, the party aims to:

- Withdraw Canada from all United Nations economic and military initiatives and the World Health Organization;
- Withdraw Canada from the World Economic Forum;
- Withdraw Canada from the Paris Climate Accord;
- Cancel net-zero targets;
- Establish a cross-Canada energy corridor to fast track oil and gas transport across the country;
- Lower corporate tax rates;
- Provide tax incentives for companies investing in resource extraction ventures;
- Reduce federal environmental assessment timelines for resource extraction proposals;
- Reform the Canadian Constitution to establish Canada as a constitutional republic "enshrining the inalienable rights that built this nation under the supremacy of God and the rule of law";
- Launch a "Canadian First" initiative, prioritizing Canadian-made products and services;
- Invest in Arctic-based infrastructure to develop a stronger resource extraction industry above the Arctic Circle;
- Abolish provincial monetary equalization programs;
- Move control of natural resources to the provincial and territory governments;
- Increase parliamentary representation of Alberta and Saskatchewan;
- Increase military spending to meet the 2% NATO target;
- Establish Arctic military bases;
- Deploy a border protection task force to prevent unwarranted entry;
- Repeal gun control laws;
- Deport all illegal immigrants, visa overstays and failed asylum seekers;
- End birthright citizenship for children of non-Canadians;
- Ban abortion, with exception for cases where the mother's life is at risk;
- Implement a national adoption program;
- Ban all gender-affirming treatments for minors;
- Ban trans women from competing in female sports;
- Prohibit the flying of partisan or political flags at public institutions;
- Prohibit schools from teaching "gender ideology"

In the 2024 Durham federal by-election, Abraham said that if elected he would "alleviate homelessness and drug deaths".

== Leadership ==
	Leader	Term Start	Term End	Notes
1	Grant Abraham	December 15, 2023	Incumbent	Party founder

== Election results ==
Election	Banner	Leader	Candidates run	Votes	%	Seats	+/-	Position	Status
2025	United	Grant Abraham	16 / 343	6,061	0.2%	0 / 343	New	10th	Non-Parliamentary party

=== By-elections ===
Banner	By-election	Date	Candidate	Votes	%	Place
United	Durham	March 4, 2024	Grant Abraham	238	0.73	8/9
United	Battle River—Crowfoot	August 18, 2025	Grant Abraham	757	1.48	5/214

== See also ==
- People's Party of Canada
- Conservative Party of Canada
- Reform Party of Canada
- 2025 Canadian federal election
