= 2025 Battle River—Crowfoot federal by-election =

By-election in Canada

2025 Battle River—Crowfoot by-election
- August 18, 2025

Riding of Battle River—Crowfoot
- Registered: 85,736
- Turnout: 59.83% (▼16.66 pp)
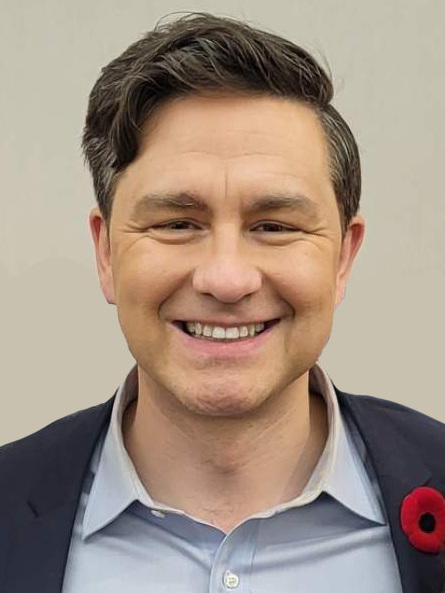

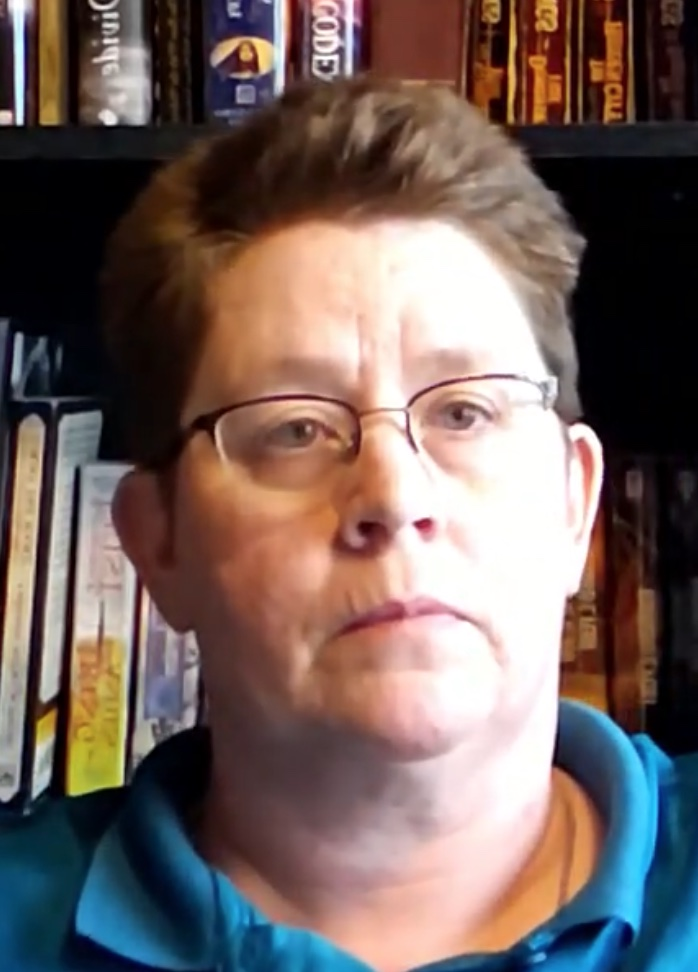
Candidate	Pierre Poilievre	Bonnie Critchley
Party	Conservative	Independent
Popular vote	41,308	5,018
Percentage	80.86%	9.82%
Swing	▼1.98 pp	n/a
Member of Parliament before election
Damien Kurek (Note: Seat was vacant since June 17, 2025.)
Conservative
Elected member of Parliament
Pierre Poilievre
Conservative

A by-election was held on August 18, 2025, to elect a member of Parliament (MP) to represent Battle River—Crowfoot, Alberta, in the House of Commons for the remainder of the 45th Parliament following the resignation of Conservative Party MP Damien Kurek. The by-election was won by Pierre Poilievre, the leader of the Conservative Party, subsequently making him the leader of the Official Opposition.

Poilievre defeated 213 other candidates and received 80.86 per cent of the vote, with the closest runner-up Independent candidate Bonnie Critchley receiving 9.82 per cent. Poilievre previously represented Carleton, Ontario, from the 2004 general election until his defeat by Liberal Party candidate Bruce Fanjoy in the 2025 general election.

== Background ==
On May 2, 2025, prime minister Mark Carney affirmed his commitment to promptly ask governor general Mary Simon to issue a writ for the by-election when requested, stating, "If it's the decision of him and the Conservative Party to trigger ... a by-election, I will ensure that it happens as soon as possible." Kurek announced his resignation later that day. Kurek said in a statement his resignation is what is best for the party and his constituents. Kurek said he intends to run again in the riding in the next general election.

By law, Kurek's resignation could not be officially tendered until 30 days after the publication of the election result in the Canada Gazette, which occurred on May 15, 2025. Kurek officially resigned on Tuesday, June 17, 2025. The governor general, who could issue a writ of election no sooner than 11 days after notice is given of a vacancy, dropped the writ on June 30, 2025, for a by-election to be held on August 18, 2025. The riding is considered a "stronghold" for the Conservatives.

The riding was targeted by the Longest Ballot Committee which pushed the number of registered candidates to a record 214. Elections Canada opted to use write-in ballots instead of standard ballots, normally used for early voting at Elections Canada offices or when using a mail-in ballot. This is permitted by the Canada Elections Act during "an unusual or unforeseen circumstance."

== Timeline ==
- April 28: 2025 Canadian federal election
  - Damien Kurek wins the Battle River—Crowfoot seat
  - Pierre Poilievre loses the Carleton seat in Ontario
- June 17: Kurek resigns his seat
- June 18: The speaker informs the chief electoral officer that the seat is vacant
- June 30: Writ of Election is issued by the governor general on the advice of the prime minister
- July 28: Nomination period closed
  - Elections Canada announces that write in ballots will be used
- July 29: Candidate forum, hosted by the Camrose and District Chamber of Commerce
- July 30: Official candidate list published
- July 31: Candidate forum in Tofield, hosted by Talk Truth
- August 5: Candidate forum, hosted by the Drumheller and District Chamber of Commerce
- August 7: Candidate forum, hosted by the Stettler Public Library and the Stettler Regional Board of Trade
- August 8–12: Advance voting
- August 13: Elections Canada reports that 14,454 votes were cast in advanced voting
- August 18: Election day. Polls close at 8:30pm MDT (UTC−06:00)
  - Pierre Poilievre wins the Battle River—Crowfoot seat

== Candidates ==
=== Grant Abraham ===
Abraham is the leader of the United Party of Canada. He is also a lawyer, author, and columnist. He ran for leader of the Conservative Party of Canada in 2022, but was disqualified.

He was a candidate in Ponoka—Didsbury in the 2025 federal election receiving 2,129 votes (3.1%). He also got 238 votes (0.7%) in the 2024 Durham federal by-election. He was also an unsuccessful candidate in the 2019 United Kingdom general election in the constituency of Strangford, where he stood for the Northern Ireland Conservatives.

Abraham lives in Calgary. He attended high school in Abbotsford, British Columbia, before completing bachelor's degree in business and English at Trinity Western University. He completed a law degree at Queen's University Belfast.

Abraham's campaign focused on advocating for Alberta separatism.

=== Jonathan Bridges ===
Bridges was the candidate for the People's Party of Canada, and is a heavy equipment mechanic who lives in Linden, Alberta. Bridges ran in the 2021 federal election as the PPC candidate in Bow River. After the 2022 Canadian federal electoral redistribution, his community of Linden was moved to Battle River—Crowfoot, and ran there in the 2025 federal election. He received 5,108 votes (10%) and 1,022 votes (1.5%) in those elections, respectively.

Bridges said that he believes that Canada's major parties have drifted away from the values of Canadians, which he described as Judeo-Christian values. Maxime Bernier, the leader of the PPC, campaigned with Bridges, and voiced support for Alberta's secession from Canada.

=== Bonnie Critchley ===
Critchley ran as a "centrist independent" candidate; she was a master corporal stationed at Canadian Forces Base Wainwright and deployed to Afghanistan in 2011. Critchley lives in Tofield, Alberta.

Critchley ran as an alternative to Conservative leader Pierre Poilievre. She is a recipient of the General Campaign Star (South-West Asia) and the Canadian Forces' Decoration. Critchley opposes the carbon tax and recent changes by the Trudeau government to gun control laws. She is in favour of electoral reform, particularly in light of the 'Longest Ballot Committee', is opposed to Albertan Independence, and says that a focus of hers is on tackling the 'increasing cost of living". She had been described as the "most visible threat to Poilievre’s [re-election] prospects".

In August 2026, following her defeat in this by-election, Critchley announced she would be the Progressive Tory candidate in Camrose for the 2027 Alberta general election.

=== Michael Harris ===
Michael Harris is a political sciences student who ran for the Libertarian Party to push forward a referendum on Albertan independence. Harris said he is running on a "platform focused on individual liberty, Alberta autonomy, and ending federal programs like equalization and supply management." Harris criticized Poilievre for using the riding as a "stepping stone to national ambitions".

=== Kenneth Kirk ===
Kirk was the Marijuana Party candidate, and leader of the party's unregistered provincial counterpart since 2000. Kirk endorsed fellow candidate Bonnie Critchley, and encouraged people to vote for her despite being on the candidate list himself.

=== Ashley MacDonald ===
MacDonald was the candidate for the Green Party of Canada. He lives in Red Deer, Alberta and works as a mental health worker.

MacDonald previously ran for the Green Party in Red Deer in the 2025 federal election, receiving 618 votes (1.0%). He also has been involved with the Green Party of Alberta, previously serving as party president, and ran provincially in Red Deer-South in 2023, getting 274 votes (1.1%).

Douglas Gook was originally announced as the candidate for the party. However, he never registered with Elections Canada; thus, he was replaced. Gook ran in the 2025 general election in Battle River—Crowfoot, receiving 474 votes (0.74%).

=== Pierre Poilievre ===
Poilievre worked for Canadian Alliance leader Stockwell Day. He was first elected in the 2004 federal election, initially representing the riding of Nepean—Carleton before it was redistributed as Carleton. Poilievre became the leader of the Conservative Party. He also served as leader of the Official Opposition from 2022 to 2025. In the 2025 Canadian federal election, Poilievre lost his seat of Carleton to Liberal candidate Bruce Fanjoy.

=== Darcy Spady ===
Spady was the candidate of the Liberal Party of Canada, and is a professional engineer in the energy sector who manages a carbon emissions reduction company. He grew up in Three Hills, in the riding, and was international president of the Society of Petroleum Engineers from 2018 to 2021.

=== Sarah Spanier ===
Spanier was running as an independent and lives in Castor, Alberta. She has worked in childcare, security, and social services.

=== Katherine Swampy ===
Swampy, a band councillor for the Samson Cree Nation and Indigenous advocate, was announced as the candidate for the New Democratic Party for the by-election on July 8, 2025. Swampy previously ran for the party in Leduc—Wetaskiwin in the 2025 federal election, placing third with 3,927 votes (6.1%), and ran in the Edmonton Centre and Battle River—Crowfoot ridings in 2019 and 2015 respectively.

She has also run provincially for the Alberta NDP in 2023 in Maskwacis-Wetaskiwin and in 2015 in Drayton Valley-Devon.

=== Jeff Willerton ===
Willerton was the candidate for the Christian Heritage Party of Canada. He is an author, Canadian Armed Forces veteran, and formerly worked for the Canadian Taxpayers Federation. He considers himself to be a social and fiscal conservative. He resides in Airdrie. He has run for seats in various provincial and federal elections in Alberta since 1997. His highest vote shares were 15.8% in the provincial riding of Airdrie-Chestermere in 2008 as a Wildrose Party candidate and 1.4% in the 2017 Calgary Heritage federal by-election as a Christian Heritage candidate.

=== Longest Ballot Committee candidates ===
The Longest Ballot Committee announced in May that they were targeting the by-election as part of its campaign protesting the first-past-the-post electoral system and would aim to have as many as 200 candidates placed on the ballot. The committee previously targeted Poilievre's former electoral district of Carleton in the 2025 federal election and claimed responsibility for adding 85 names to the ballot in that vote. All of the declared independents except Colquhoun, Critchley, and Spanier are LBC candidates, a total of 201, far surpassing their previous record set earlier in 2025, and reaching their goal of 200 names. The grand total of 214 candidates on the ballot also more than doubles the previous all-time record of 91 set during the 2025 Carleton election and the 2024 LaSalle—Émard—Verdun federal by-election, both attributed to the LBC's efforts.

== Debates ==
2025 Battle River—Crowfoot federal by-election debates
Date	Organizers	Location	Link	P Participant I Invitee A Absent invitee N Non-invitee											Sources
Date	Organizers	Location	Link	Poilievre Conservative	Spady Liberal	Swampy NDP	Bridges PPC	MacDonald Green	Willerton Christian Heritage	Harris Libertarian	Kirk Marijuana	Abraham United	Critchley Independent	Spanier Independent	Sources
July 29, 2025	Camrose & District Chamber of Commerce	Cargill Theatre, Jeanne & Peter Lougheed Performing Arts Centre Camrose	Vimeo	P	P	P	P	P	P	P	A	P	P	P	
July 31, 2025	Talk Truth/Heritage Christian Ministries Association	The House Ministries Church Tofield	YouTube	A	A	A	A	N	P	P	N	P	A	N	
August 5, 2025	Drumheller & District Chamber of Commerce(with support from the Hanna & District Chamber of Commerce)	Badlands Community Facility – Banquet Halls B & C Drumheller	Facebook	P	P	P	A	P	P	P	A	P	P	A	
August 7, 2025	Stettler Public Library and Stettler Regional Board of Trade	Stettler Community Hall	Facebook	A	P	P	P	P	P	P	P	P	P	P	

== Result ==
Canadian federal by-election, August 18, 2025: Battle River—Crowfoot Resignation of Damien Kurek
Party	Candidate	Votes	%	±%
Conservative	Pierre Poilievre	41,308	80.86	-1.98
Independent	Bonnie Critchley	5,018	9.82	–
Liberal	Darcy Spady	2,095	4.10	-7.57
New Democratic	Katherine Swampy	1,061	2.08	-1.10
United	Grant Abraham	757	1.48	–
People's	Jonathan Bridges	138	0.27	-1.31
Green	Ashley MacDonald	116	0.23	-0.50
Libertarian	Michael Harris	103	0.20	–
Christian Heritage	Jeff Willerton	92	0.18	–
Independent	Sarah Spanier	49	0.10	–
Marijuana	Kenneth Kirk	40	0.08	–
Centrist	Ahmed Hassan	15	0.03	–
Independent	Bert William Westergard	11	0.02	–
Independent	Breccan Zimmer	11	0.02	–
Independent	Dillon Anderson	10	0.02	–
Independent	Nicole Betts	7	0.01	–
Independent	Nickolas Meuters-Murphy	7	0.01	–
Independent	Diane Prentice	7	0.01	–
Independent	Glen Armstrong	6	0.01	–
Independent	Caitlyn Baker	6	0.01	–
Independent	Lisa Parsons	6	0.01	–
Independent	Jason Buzzell	5	0.01	–
Independent	Jenny Cartwright	5	0.01	–
Independent	Deborah Chalmers	5	0.01	–
Independent	William Grant	5	0.01	–
Independent	Paul Jones	5	0.01	–
Independent	Brennen Perry	5	0.01	–
Independent	Anthony Perullo	5	0.01	–
Independent	Myles René Laurent St. Pierre	5	0.01	–
Independent	Fraser Anderson	4	0.01	–
Independent	Rebecca Boyce	4	0.01	–
Independent	Pierre Gauthier	4	0.01	–
Independent	Preston Hoff	4	0.01	–
Independent	Mark Ruthenberg	4	0.01	–
Independent	Ceilidh Stewart	4	0.01	–
Independent	Danica Boe	3	0.01	–
Independent	Aaron Bowles	3	0.01	–
Independent	Sarah Burke	3	0.01	–
Independent	David Cherniak	3	0.01	–
Independent	John Dale	3	0.01	–
Independent	Emily Goose	3	0.01	–
Independent	Corey Hales	3	0.01	–
Independent	Grace Pender	3	0.01	–
Independent	Noah Reid	3	0.01	–
Independent	David Sader	3	0.01	–
Independent	Molly Sun	3	0.01	–
Independent	Nicola Zoghbi	3	0.01	–
Independent	Alex Banks	2	0.00	–
Independent	Stacy Lynn Billingsley	2	0.00	–
Independent	Marten Borch	2	0.00	–
Independent	Jakeb Brown	2	0.00	–
Independent	Annelies Cooper	2	0.00	–
Independent	Hannah DeWolfe	2	0.00	–
Independent	Elizabeth Dupuis	2	0.00	–
Independent	Kenneth Durham	2	0.00	–
Independent	Michael Dyck	2	0.00	–
Independent	Katherine Dyson	2	0.00	–
Independent	Michael Louis Fitzgerald	2	0.00	–
Independent	Daniel Gagnon	2	0.00	–
Independent	Kerri Hildebrandt	2	0.00	–
Independent	Elsie Kipp	2	0.00	–
Independent	Chris Kowalchuk	2	0.00	–
Independent	Johnson Hon Wa Lee	2	0.00	–
Independent	Maria Light	2	0.00	–
Independent	Derek Adam MacKay	2	0.00	–
Independent	Jeffrey McLean	2	0.00	–
Independent	Riley Moss	2	0.00	–
Independent	Kimberley Nugent	2	0.00	–
Independent	Alexander Panchuk	2	0.00	–
Independent	Yagya Parihar	2	0.00	–
Independent	Samuel Pignedoli	2	0.00	–
Independent	Lorant Polya	2	0.00	–
Independent	Jayson Roy	2	0.00	–
Independent	Adam Smith	2	0.00	–
Independent	Patrick Strzalkowski	2	0.00	–
Independent	Callan Wassenaar	2	0.00	–
Independent	Jeremy Wedel	2	0.00	–
Independent	Hazel Westwood	2	0.00	–
Independent	Nicholas Ashmore	1	0.00	–
Independent	Michael Bednarski	1	0.00	–
Independent	Lilia Boisvert	1	0.00	–
Independent	Alain Bourgault	1	0.00	–
Independent	Eva Bowering	1	0.00	–
Independent	Joshua Brauner	1	0.00	–
Independent	Alexandre Brochu	1	0.00	–
Independent	Chun Chen	1	0.00	–
Independent	Shawn Clendining	1	0.00	–
Independent	Lindsay Elaine Shyla Colosimo	1	0.00	–
Independent	Dylan Colquhoun	1	0.00	–
Independent	Jayson Cowan	1	0.00	–
Independent	Michael Davis	1	0.00	–
Independent	Geneviève Dorval	1	0.00	–
Independent	Jordan Drew	1	0.00	–
Independent	Murray Dunham	1	0.00	–
Independent	Eric Duong	1	0.00	–
Independent	Mark Eccleston	1	0.00	–
Independent	Jeremy Edwards	1	0.00	–
Independent	Allison Fanjoy	1	0.00	–
Independent	Gabriel Finn	1	0.00	–
Independent	Hubert Fischer	1	0.00	–
Independent	Matthew Gillies	1	0.00	–
Independent	Peter Gorman	1	0.00	–
Independent	Jacqueline Grabowski	1	0.00	–
Independent	Andrew Guenther	1	0.00	–
Independent	Blake Hamilton	1	0.00	–
Independent	Jason Hodgson	1	0.00	–
Independent	Dakota Hourie	1	0.00	–
Independent	Uneeb Islam	1	0.00	–
Independent	Michael Jones	1	0.00	–
Independent	Richard Kenkel	1	0.00	–
Independent	Madison Kennedy	1	0.00	–
Independent	Abraham Lau	1	0.00	–
Independent	Charles Lemieux	1	0.00	–
Independent	Robert Marsden	1	0.00	–
Independent	Agnieszka Marszalek	1	0.00	–
Independent	Geoffrey Meens	1	0.00	–
Independent	Sophia Nguyen	1	0.00	–
Independent	Pascal Noël	1	0.00	–
Independent	Steve Oates	1	0.00	–
Independent	Lény Painchaud	1	0.00	–
Independent	Lanna Palsson	1	0.00	–
Independent	Céline Paquin	1	0.00	–
Independent	Meagan Roberge	1	0.00	–
Independent	Melanie Roberge	1	0.00	–
Independent	Mark Russell	1	0.00	–
Independent	Kayll Schaefer	1	0.00	–
Independent	Hakim Sheriff	1	0.00	–
Independent	Eric Shorten	1	0.00	–
Independent	Bradley Stewart	1	0.00	–
Independent	Mário Stocco	1	0.00	–
Independent	Faith Tabladillo	1	0.00	–
Independent	Alex Vallée	1	0.00	–
Independent	Dennis Vanmeer	1	0.00	–
Independent	Bryan Wang	1	0.00	–
Independent	Joshua Wong	1	0.00	–
Independent	Yao ZhangLi	1	0.00	–
Independent	David Zhu	1	0.00	–
Independent	Barry Zukewich	1	0.00	–
Independent	Marthalee Aykroyd	0	0.00	–
Independent	Line Bélanger	0	0.00	–
Independent	Michel Bélanger	0	0.00	–
Independent	Jeani Boudreault	0	0.00	–
Independent	Jeffery Brazeau	0	0.00	–
Independent	Bo Cai	0	0.00	–
Independent	Cameron Campos	0	0.00	–
Independent	Nicolas Champagne	0	0.00	–
Independent	Jaël Champagne Gareau	0	0.00	–
Independent	Claude Cordon Pichilla	0	0.00	–
Independent	Tristan Dell	0	0.00	–
Independent	Gerrit Dogger	0	0.00	–
Independent	Abel Erazo-Ibarra	0	0.00	–
Independent	Tracy Farber	0	0.00	–
Independent	Brian Farrenkopf	0	0.00	–
Independent	Thomas Fitzgerald	0	0.00	–
Independent	Connor Fullerton	0	0.00	–
Independent	Jordan Gerrard	0	0.00	–
Independent	Eric Gilmour	0	0.00	–
Independent	Laurie Goble	0	0.00	–
Independent	David Patrick Greene	0	0.00	–
Independent	Nicolette Gross	0	0.00	–
Independent	Kathleen Gudmundsson	0	0.00	–
Independent	Richard Haley	0	0.00	–
Independent	Kazimir Haykowsky	0	0.00	–
Independent	Iriella Hicks	0	0.00	–
Independent	Loren Hicks	0	0.00	–
Independent	Seyed Hosseini Lavasani	0	0.00	–
Independent	Glendyn Howse	0	0.00	–
Independent	Ryan Huard	0	0.00	–
Independent	Jack Jean-Louis	0	0.00	–
Independent	Derek Jouppi	0	0.00	–
Independent	Erich Jurgens	0	0.00	–
Independent	Elza Kephart	0	0.00	–
Independent	Dannielle Konkle	0	0.00	–
Independent	Solomon Krygier-Paine	0	0.00	–
Independent	Andrew Kulas	0	0.00	–
Independent	Samuel Lafontaine	0	0.00	–
Independent	Alain Lamontagne	0	0.00	–
Independent	Eric Laverdure	0	0.00	–
Independent	Jocelyn LeBlanc-Courchaine	0	0.00	–
Independent	Alexander Lein	0	0.00	–
Independent	Renée Lemieux	0	0.00	–
Independent	Jeffrey Leroux	0	0.00	–
Independent	Litma Kai Ching Leung	0	0.00	–
Independent	Cedric Ludlow	0	0.00	–
Independent	Jennifer Margaret Mackenzie-Miller	0	0.00	–
Independent	Nicolas Maltais	0	0.00	–
Independent	Kevin Manzano	0	0.00	–
Independent	Eric March	0	0.00	–
Independent	Devin McManus	0	0.00	–
Independent	Robert Melting Tallow	0	0.00	–
Independent	Joanne L Metters	0	0.00	–
Independent	Nicholas Mew	0	0.00	–
Independent	Mark Moutter	0	0.00	–
Independent	Rob Mumford	0	0.00	–
Independent	Molly Munn	0	0.00	–
Independent	Sam Nabi	0	0.00	–
Independent	John Francis O'Flynn	0	0.00	–
Independent	Clifford Pine	0	0.00	–
Independent	Brian Ramchandar	0	0.00	–
Independent	Spencer Rocchi	0	0.00	–
Independent	Wallace Richard Rowat	0	0.00	–
Independent	Barry Rueger	0	0.00	–
Independent	Chris Scrimes	0	0.00	–
Independent	Charles Douglas Sleep	0	0.00	–
Independent	Julie St-Amand	0	0.00	–
Independent	Pascal St-Amand	0	0.00	–
Independent	Andi Sweet	0	0.00	–
Independent	Corinne Unrau	0	0.00	–
Independent	Tyson Warner	0	0.00	–
Independent	Simon John Edwin Wedel	0	0.00	–
Independent	Michaiah Williams	0	0.00	–
Independent	Brian Wishart	0	0.00	–
Independent	Michael Wisniewski	0	0.00	–
Independent	Belinda Christine Young	0	0.00	–
Total valid votes		51,085	99.59	–
Total rejected ballots		211	0.41	-0.19
Turnout		51,296	59.83	-16.66
Eligible voters		85,736	–	
Conservative hold		Swing		–
Source: Elections Canada

== Previous result ==
2025 Canadian federal election: Battle River—Crowfoot
Party	Candidate	Votes	%	±%	Expenditures
Conservative	Damien Kurek	53,684	82.84	+11.55	$91,654.90
Liberal	Brent Sutton	7,566	11.67	+7.38	$3,126.03
New Democratic	James MacKay	2,061	3.18	–6.52	none listed
People's	Jonathan Bridges	1,022	1.58	–7.69	$4.50
Green	Douglas Gook	474	0.73	–0.21	none listed
Total valid votes/expense limit		64,807	99.40	–	$159,014.07
Total rejected ballots		391	0.60	+0.16	
Turnout		65,198	74.45	+2.67	
Eligible voters		87,578			
Conservative hold		Swing		+9.47	
Source: Elections Canada

== See also ==
- 2025 Canadian federal election in Alberta
- 2025 Alberta provincial by-elections
