= Birthright citizenship =

Birthright citizenship may refer to:

- Jus soli (the right of the soil or the land), a Latin term meaning that one's nationality is determined by the place of one's birth
- Jus sanguinis (the right of blood), a Latin term meaning that one may acquire nationality of a state at birth if either or both of their parents have citizenship of that state

== See also ==
- Birthright citizenship in the United States
