= 2024 Durham federal by-election =

Canadian by-election

- March 4, 2024

Riding of Durham
- Turnout: 27.9%
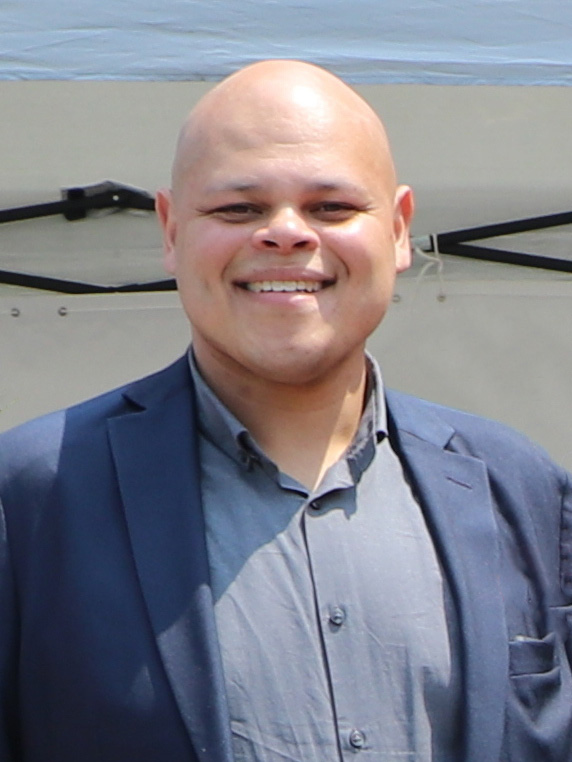
	First party	Second party	Third party
		LPC	NDP
Candidate	Jamil Jivani	Robert Rock	Chris Borgia
Party	Conservative	Liberal	New Democratic
Popular vote	18,610	7,285	3,363
Percentage	57.44%	22.48%	10.38%
Swing	▲11.04 pp	▼7.44 pp	▼7.14 pp
MP before election
Erin O'Toole
Conservative
Elected MP
Jamil Jivani
Conservative

A by-election was held in the federal riding of Durham in Ontario on March 4, 2024, following the resignation of Conservative MP, and former Leader of the Conservative Party, Erin O'Toole.

== Background ==
=== Constituency ===
The federal riding of Durham covers most of the southeastern part of the Regional Municipality of Durham, on the eastern edge of the Greater Toronto Area. The district includes the entirety of the Township of Scugog and roughly half of the geographic area of the Municipality of Clarington, including the communities of Bowmanville and Courtice. The riding also includes the northern part of the City of Oshawa.

This is the third iteration of a riding under this name, with the current riding coming into use in 2004, when Clarington—Scugog—Uxbridge was renamed. Durham is considered a relatively safe seat for the Conservatives, who have held the seat since 2004.

=== Representation ===
The riding of Durham was vacated on August 1, 2023, following the March 31 announcement from Conservative MP Erin O'Toole that he would resign his seat, just over a year after he was removed as Leader of the Official Opposition and Conservative leader. O'Toole had held the seat since a 2012 by-election in which he was elected to replace Bev Oda. The by-election was called for March 4, 2024.

== Candidates ==
Grant Abraham, author of Battle for the Soul of Canada: Firing the Forge, Grant has worked as an international lawyer, farmer and international development director. Abraham represented the newest formed Canadian federal party, the United Party of Canada. He attempted to run in the 2022 Conservative Party of Canada leadership election, but was deemed ineligible. He is from Calgary.

The NDP candidate is electrician and education co-ordinator Chris Borgia. He ran for the Ontario New Democratic Party in Durham in the 2022 Ontario general election. He is from Pickering.

The People's Party candidate is Patricia Conlin. She is the president of the Global Consulting Group Inc., is an author, international speaker and leadership trainer. She ran for the People's Party in this riding in the 2021 Canadian federal election. She is from Port Perry.

Pranay Gunti is running as an independent. He is an information technology consultant from Bowmanville. He ran for the Kawartha Pine Ridge District School Board in 2022.

Jamil Jivani, a lawyer and former president of the Canada Strong and Free Network, defeated Theresa Corless to win the Conservative nomination.

The Green Party candidate is Kevin MacKenzie, who has served as a trustee on the Peterborough Victoria Northumberland and Clarington Catholic District School Board since 2018. He works in sales and his hometown is Courtice.

Running for the Centrist Party of Canada is Khalid Qureshi. He is a retired engineer from Markham.

Scugog councillor Robert Rock was acclaimed as the Liberal candidate, having previously sought the Conservative nomination. He has served on Scugog council since 2021 and represents Ward 3, Scugog Island.

The Rhino candidate is Adam Smith. He ran for the party in this riding in the 2021 election and as an independent in the 2022 Mississauga—Lakeshore federal by-election. He is from Bowmanville.

== Results ==
Canadian federal by-election, March 4, 2024: Durham Resignation of Erin O'Toole
Party	Candidate	Votes	%	±%
Conservative	Jamil Jivani	18,610	57.44	+11.04
Liberal	Robert Rock	7,285	22.48	–7.44
New Democratic	Chris Borgia	3,363	10.38	–7.14
People's	Patricia Conlin	1,435	4.43	–1.07
Green	Kevin MacKenzie	698	2.15	
Independent	Pranay Gunti	374	1.15	
Centrist	Khalid Qureshi	336	1.04	
United	Grant Abraham	238	0.73	
Rhinoceros	Adam Smith	62	0.19	–0.03
Total valid votes		32,401		
Total rejected ballots				
Turnout		32,401	27.87	–33.32
Eligible voters		116,259		
Conservative hold		Swing		+9.24
Source: Elections Canada

== 2021 result ==
2021 Canadian federal election: Durham
Party	Candidate	Votes	%	±%	Expenditures
Conservative	Erin O'Toole	31,423	46.39	+4.28	$112,775.26
Liberal	Jonathan Giancroce	20,267	29.92	–2.33	$56,079.34
New Democratic	Christopher Cameron	11,865	17.52	–0.73	$4,774.16
People's	Patricia Conlin	3,725	5.50	+3.51	$8,162.85
Independent	Sarah Gabrielle Baron	251	0.37	–	$2,215.46
Rhinoceros	Adam Smith	150	0.22	–	none listed
Independent	Kurdil-Telt Patch	49	0.07	–	none listed
Total valid votes/expense limit		67,730	99.33	–	$135,835.56
Total rejected ballots		455	0.67	+0.01	
Turnout		68,185	61.19	–6.80	
Eligible voters		111,428			
Conservative hold		Swing		+3.30	
Source: Elections Canada
