= Erin O'Toole =

Canadian politician (born 1973)

The Honourable Erin O'Toole PC CD
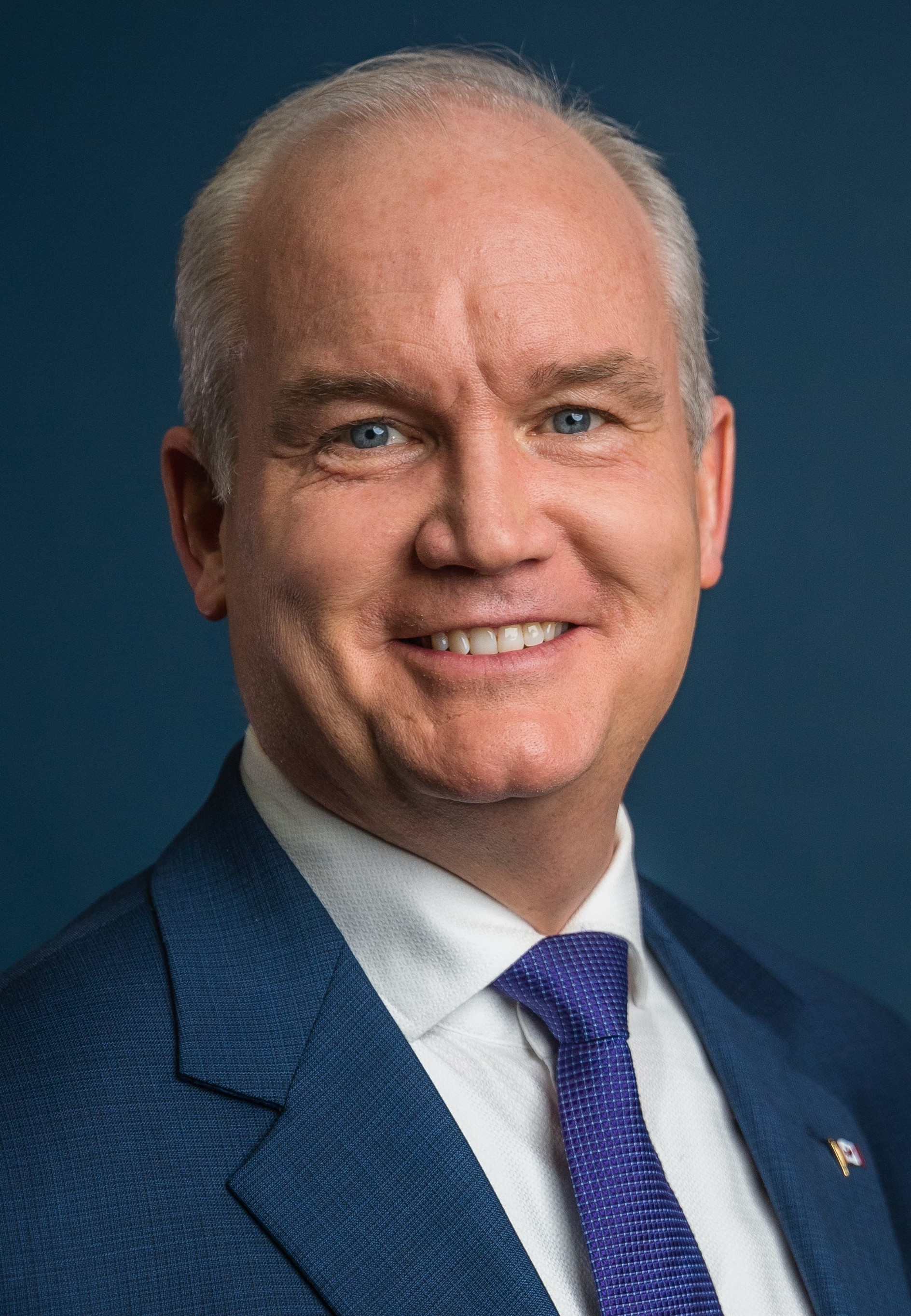
- Official portrait, 2021

Leader of the Opposition
- In office August 24, 2020 – February 2, 2022
- Deputy: Candice Bergen
- Preceded by: Andrew Scheer
- Succeeded by: Candice Bergen

Leader of the Conservative Party
- In office August 24, 2020 – February 2, 2022
- Deputy: Candice Bergen
- Preceded by: Andrew Scheer
- Succeeded by: Candice Bergen (interim)

Minister of Veterans Affairs
- In office January 5, 2015 – November 4, 2015
- Prime Minister: Stephen Harper
- Preceded by: Julian Fantino
- Succeeded by: Kent Hehr

Member of Parliament for Durham
- In office November 26, 2012 – August 1, 2023
- Preceded by: Bev Oda
- Succeeded by: Jamil Jivani

Shadow cabinet posts
- 2020–2021: Shadow Minister for Middle Class Prosperity
- 2017–2020: Shadow Minister for Foreign Affairs

Personal details
- Born: Erin Michael O'Toole; January 22, 1973 (age 53) Montreal, Quebec, Canada
- Party: Conservative
- Spouse: Rebecca Grant (m. 2000)
- Children: 2
- Parent: John O'Toole (father)
- Education: Royal Military College of Canada (BA (Hons)); Dalhousie University (LLB)
- Profession: Politician; lawyer
- Website: erinotoole.ca

Military service
- Allegiance: Canada
- Branch/service: Air Command
- Years of service: 1991–2000 (active); 2000–2003 (reserve)
- Rank: Captain
- Unit: 423 Maritime Helicopter Squadron
- Awards: Canadian Forces' Decoration; Sikorsky Helicopter Rescue Award

Erin Michael O'Toole PC CD (born January 22, 1973) is a Canadian lawyer, former military officer and politician who was the leader of the Conservative Party of Canada and the leader of the Official Opposition from 2020 to 2022. O'Toole was elected as a member of Parliament (MP) in 2012, representing Durham until 2023. O'Toole served in the Canadian Armed Forces for 12 years, before becoming a lawyer and entering politics.

Born in Montreal, O'Toole grew up in Port Perry and Bowmanville in Ontario. He joined the military in 1991 and studied at the Royal Military College (RMC) until 1995. He was commissioned in Air Command, (Note: Air Command became the Royal Canadian Air Force in 2011.) serving as an air navigator, eventually attaining the rank of captain. Following his active service, he received a law degree, practicing law for nearly a decade until he was elected to the House of Commons in a 2012 by-election. In 2015, O'Toole briefly served as veterans affairs minister in the Harper government. In 2017, he ran for the party's leadership, finishing third to winner Andrew Scheer.

After Scheer resigned as leader in late 2019, O'Toole ran a successful leadership campaign, defeating former Progressive Conservative leader Peter MacKay in the 2020 leadership election. O'Toole's domestic policies included support for the elimination of the federal deficit, the simplification of federal taxes, a low carbon savings account, and pipeline construction. In foreign policy, he advocated for a CANZUK agreement and a hard-line approach to the Chinese government. Although he positioned himself as a "true blue" conservative during the leadership race, O'Toole began embracing a more centrist approach, and reversed his previous opposition towards the federal carbon tax and assault weapons ban.

O'Toole lost the 2021 federal election to the Liberal Party led by Prime Minister Justin Trudeau, with the Conservatives winning the same number of seats as they held before the election. Although O'Toole pledged to remain as leader, his attempts to move the Conservative Party to the centre gained criticism from a considerable number of party MPs, who ousted him on February 2, 2022, through a leadership review.

== Early life and career ==
O'Toole was born in Montreal, Quebec, on January 22, 1973, the son of Mollie (née Hall) and John O'Toole, who served as the member of Provincial Parliament (MPP) for Durham in the Legislative Assembly of Ontario between 1995 and 2014. His father is of Irish descent. His mother was born in London, England, and came to Canada after World War II. Following his mother's death when he was nine years old, his family moved to Port Perry, Ontario, where he attended elementary school. O'Toole and his family later moved to Bowmanville, Ontario, where he graduated from Bowmanville High School.

In 1991, O'Toole joined the military, enrolling at the Royal Military College of Canada in Kingston, Ontario. He graduated with an honours Bachelor of Arts degree in history and political science in 1995.

=== Military career ===
Following his graduation, O'Toole was commissioned as an officer in the Canadian Forces Air Command. He was first posted to Trenton, Ontario, where he was involved in search and rescue operations. O'Toole also spent time at 17 Wing in Winnipeg, Manitoba, where he completed his training as an air navigator.

In 1997, O'Toole was posted to 12 Wing in Shearwater, Nova Scotia. While serving at this post, O'Toole flew as a tactical navigator on a CH-124 (Sea King) helicopter with 423 Squadron, conducted maritime surveillance, and performed search and rescue and naval support operations. While serving at 12 Wing, O'Toole was promoted to the rank of captain and was awarded the Sikorsky Helicopter Rescue Award for rescuing an injured fisherman at sea.

In 2000, O'Toole completed his active service in the military. He transferred to the reserves, working as a training officer running flight simulators, while he pursued a law degree. He received the Canadian Forces' Decoration for 12 years of service to Canada.

=== Legal career ===
O'Toole graduated from the Schulich School of Law at Dalhousie University with a law degree in 2003. He returned to Ontario where he articled at, and later became a lawyer with, Stikeman Elliott, a business law firm in Toronto. During this time, O'Toole primarily practised in the areas of product liability, insolvency, competition and general commercial law. Between 2006 and 2011, O'Toole served as Canadian in-house counsel for Procter & Gamble. He acted as corporate counsel for Gillette, provided commercial and regulatory law advice, was counsel on issues relating to legislation, and investigated counterfeiting operations. In 2011, O'Toole joined the law firm Heenan Blaikie, where he was a registered lobbyist for Facebook, Inc.

== Political career ==
=== Early political career ===
In May 2012, O'Toole announced his plans to run as the Conservative candidate in the by-election for Durham, following Bev Oda's resignation, winning the seat on November 26, 2012. In September 2013, Prime Minister Stephen Harper named O'Toole the parliamentary secretary to the minister of international trade, Ed Fast.

In 2014, O'Toole partnered with Senator Roméo Dallaire to host the first Samuel Sharpe Memorial Breakfast, in honour of former soldier and MP Samuel Simpson Sharpe. Sharpe committed suicide in 1918 following his return home from World War I. O'Toole and Dallaire started the memorial breakfast to bring issues of veterans' mental health to the forefront and to improve access to treatment and resources for soldiers suffering from operational stress injuries. In May 2018, O'Toole introduced a motion to install a plaque commemorating Sharpe on Parliament Hill, which passed unanimously.

On January 5, 2015, Harper appointed O'Toole as minister of veterans affairs, replacing Julian Fantino. O'Toole prioritized repairing relations with veterans and addressing the complaints Canadian veterans had with Fantino. During his time as veterans affairs minister, he convinced veterans who had sued the Canadian government to place a halt on their lawsuit while they entered into settlement negotiations. In the lawsuit, filed before O'Toole was named minister, the Canadian soldiers argued that the 2006 overhaul of veteran benefits was discriminatory.

In the 2015 election, O'Toole was re-elected as MP for Durham, receiving 45 per cent of the vote, followed by Liberal candidate Corinna Traill with 36 per cent.

=== 2017 Conservative leadership campaign ===
Stephen Harper resigned as Conservative party leader after the Liberals won a majority in the 2015 federal election. O'Toole announced that he would seek the interim leadership of the Conservative Party. Rona Ambrose defeated him but named O'Toole the Official Opposition critic for public safety.

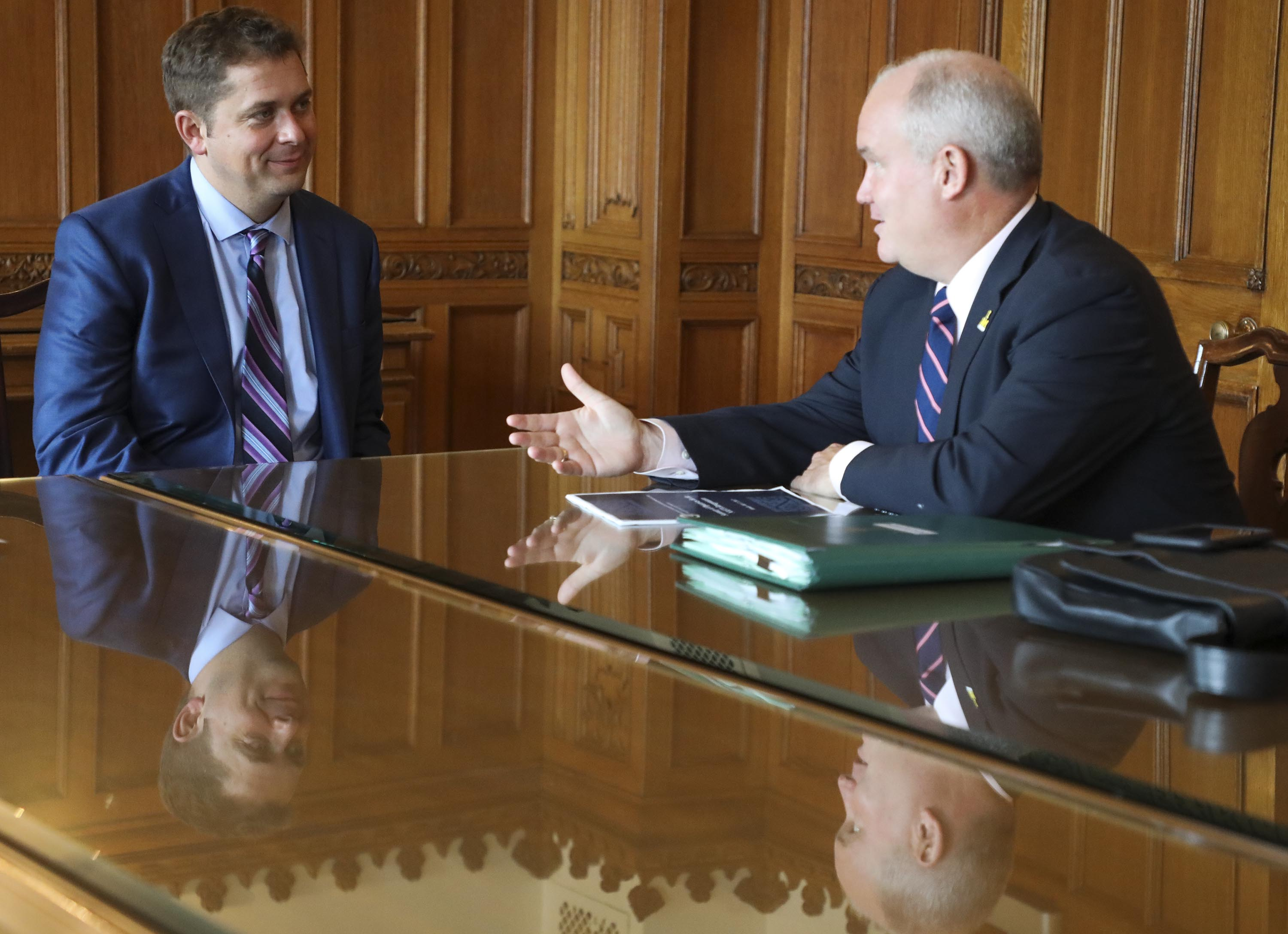
O'Toole with Andrew Scheer several months after the Conservative Party leadership election in 2017

On October 14, 2016, O'Toole announced his candidacy for the 2017 Conservative Party of Canada leadership election. O'Toole ran a positive campaign and avoided personally attacking other candidates during the campaign, arguing that Prime Minister Justin Trudeau does not own optimism. He received endorsements from 31 MPs, 12 former MPs, and 17 provincial politicians. O'Toole finished in third place, behind Maxime Bernier and the eventual winner Andrew Scheer.

=== Foreign affairs critic and second reelection ===
In 2018, after Patrick Brown resigned over accusations of sexual misconduct, O'Toole considered entering the Ontario Progressive Conservative leadership race. He ultimately passed on the opportunity, instead supporting Christine Elliott. On August 31, 2017, Andrew Scheer appointed O'Toole the official opposition critic for foreign affairs.

As Prime Minister Justin Trudeau was re-elected as prime minister in 2019, O'Toole won re-election in his riding, beating the Liberal candidate by about 10 per cent of the vote.

=== 2020 Conservative leadership campaign ===
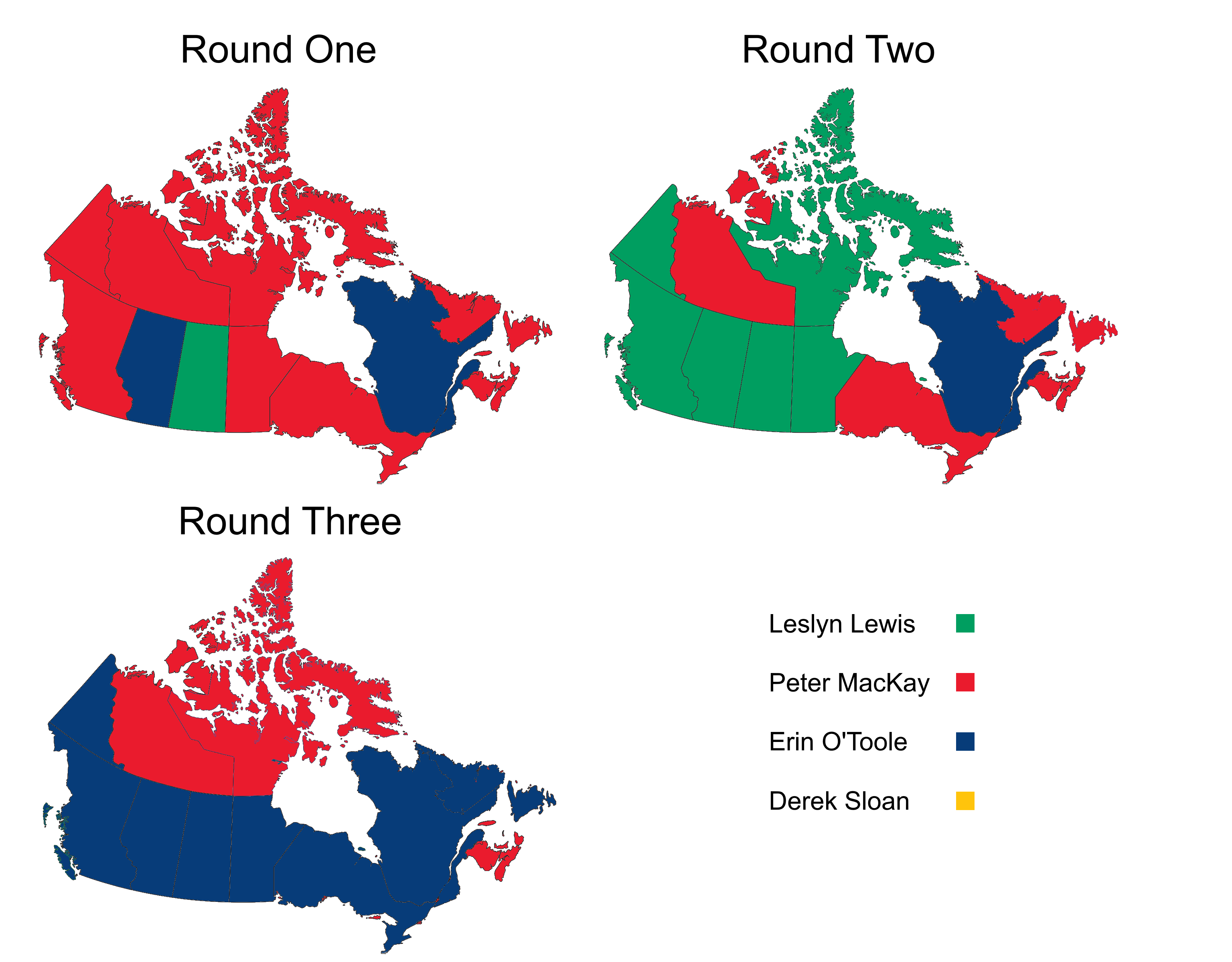
2020 Conservative Party of Canada leadership election results by province

In December 2019, Andrew Scheer announced his resignation as Conservative Party leader after it was revealed that he had used party funds for his children's private schooling. Scheer remained leader until his successor was elected.

O'Toole announced that he would seek the leadership of the Conservative Party in late January 2020. During his campaign, he framed himself as a "true blue" conservative, implying that rivals like Peter MacKay were less conservative. It helped that Pierre Poilievre, who was expected to get support from the right of the party, decided not to run. O'Toole's tone was angrier this time than during his first leadership run, which he stated was due to his increasing worry about the country after five years under a Trudeau government. He believed that his status as an MP would allow him to hold Trudeau accountable as soon as he became leader. During the campaign, O'Toole alleged that MacKay's campaign obtained stolen internal campaign data from him. A former intern at Calgary Centre MP Greg McLean's office later admitted to obtaining the data.

O'Toole won the leadership election after three rounds were counted, replacing Andrew Scheer. His victory was attributed partially to his pitch to socially conservative voters including supporters of candidates Derek Sloan and Leslyn Lewis to mark him as their second or third choice. He generally performed better in Conservative- and Bloc Québécois-held ridings, in rural areas, and in areas with fewer visible minorities. Despite representing a riding on the eastern edge of the Greater Toronto Area, O'Toole performed poorly there. People's Party leader Maxime Bernier criticized him in remarks dismissed by fellow leadership candidate Sloan, stating that he was not a real conservative.

=== Leadership of the Conservative Party ===
Shortly after becoming leader, O'Toole said that triggering a fall election was not his priority and he preferred to focus instead on the ongoing COVID-19 pandemic and finding jobs for the unemployed. He reaffirmed his position in December 2020, stating that an election should not take place until after the pandemic had ended. Still, he said the Conservative Party was prepared for another election if one was called. On September 2, 2020, he announced Candice Bergen would serve as his deputy. O'Toole revealed his Shadow Cabinet the following week, with most roles changing from the previous Scheer-led one.

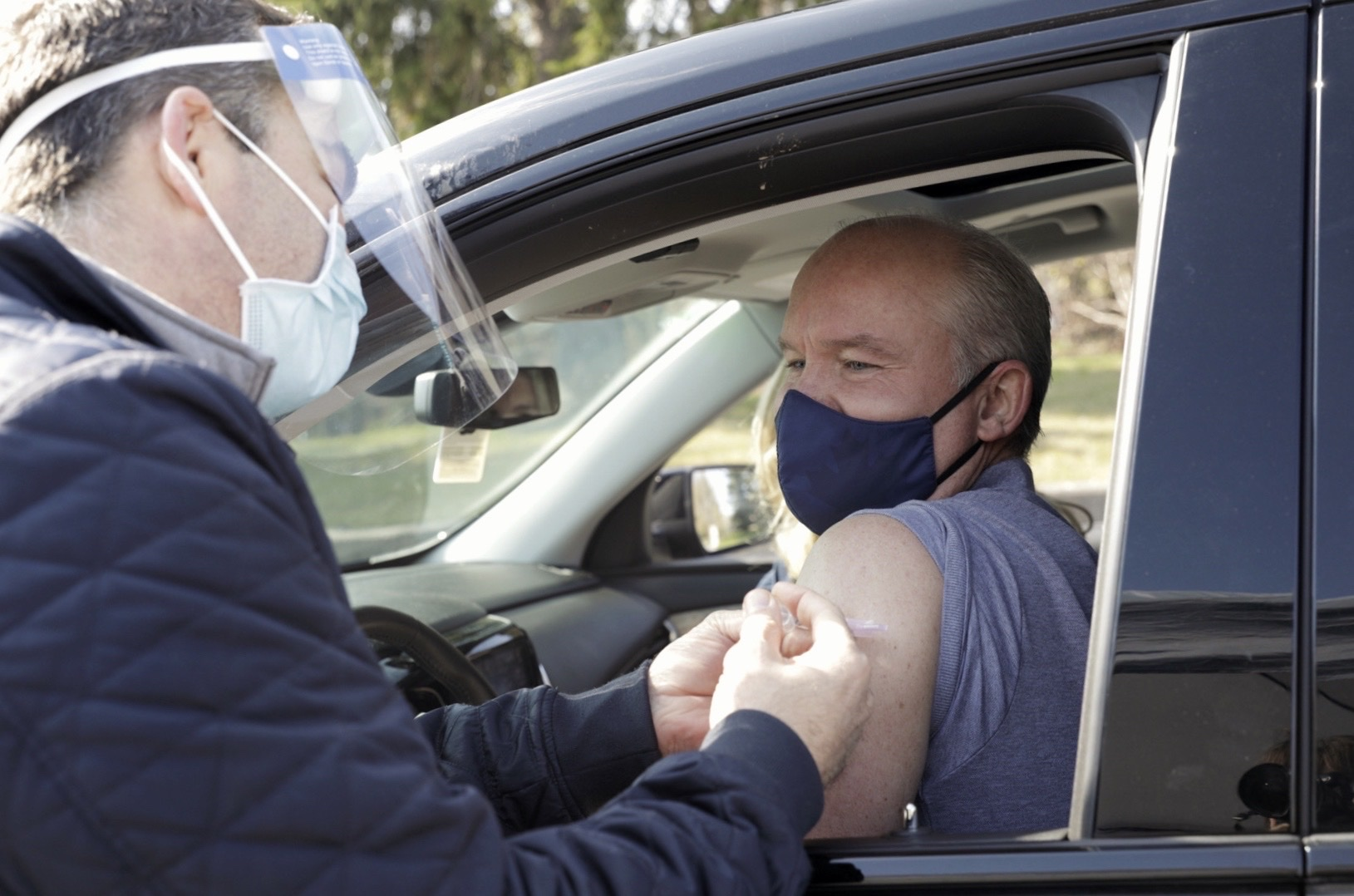
O'Toole receiving the vaccine for COVID-19

During the COVID-19 pandemic, O'Toole criticized the Trudeau government for not approving rapid and at-home testing options, arguing that the economy would be unstable if they or a vaccine were unavailable. O'Toole has praised Alberta's pandemic response for allowing testing at pharmacies and being less restrictive than other provinces. When distribution of a vaccine was near, he criticized the government for being unable to deliver doses as quickly as other countries like the US and the UK. He called for more transparency regarding the vaccine rollout plan and stated that Canada only focused on preordering vaccines from Pfizer and Moderna after a partnership with a Chinese company failed.

In response to the WE Charity scandal, O'Toole proposed creating an anti-corruption committee tasked with releasing related details and other possible ethics violations made by the government during the COVID-19 pandemic. Following the defeat of the motion after Trudeau declared it a confidence vote, O'Toole proposed that these instead be done by the health committee.

During his leadership, O'Toole worked to attract working-class people to the Conservative Party, noting his experience of watching auto workers lose their jobs in his hometown of Bowmanville, and his support for unions. Despite his support for unions, union leaders were skeptical given his previous parliamentary voting record and his pre-2015 free trade-related work. O'Toole also softened his rhetoric, presenting himself as moderate to counter accusations from opponents that he was trying to market to the far-right.

Due to his shift from the "true blue" rhetoric of his leadership campaign to a more moderate approach, he has received some criticism from within the party and fears that he may drop certain Conservative priorities such as opposition to the carbon tax. O'Toole later acknowledged such party criticism, though he continued said approach, stating the party must have "the courage to change" and attract new voters in order to win against the Liberals.

==== 2021 election ====
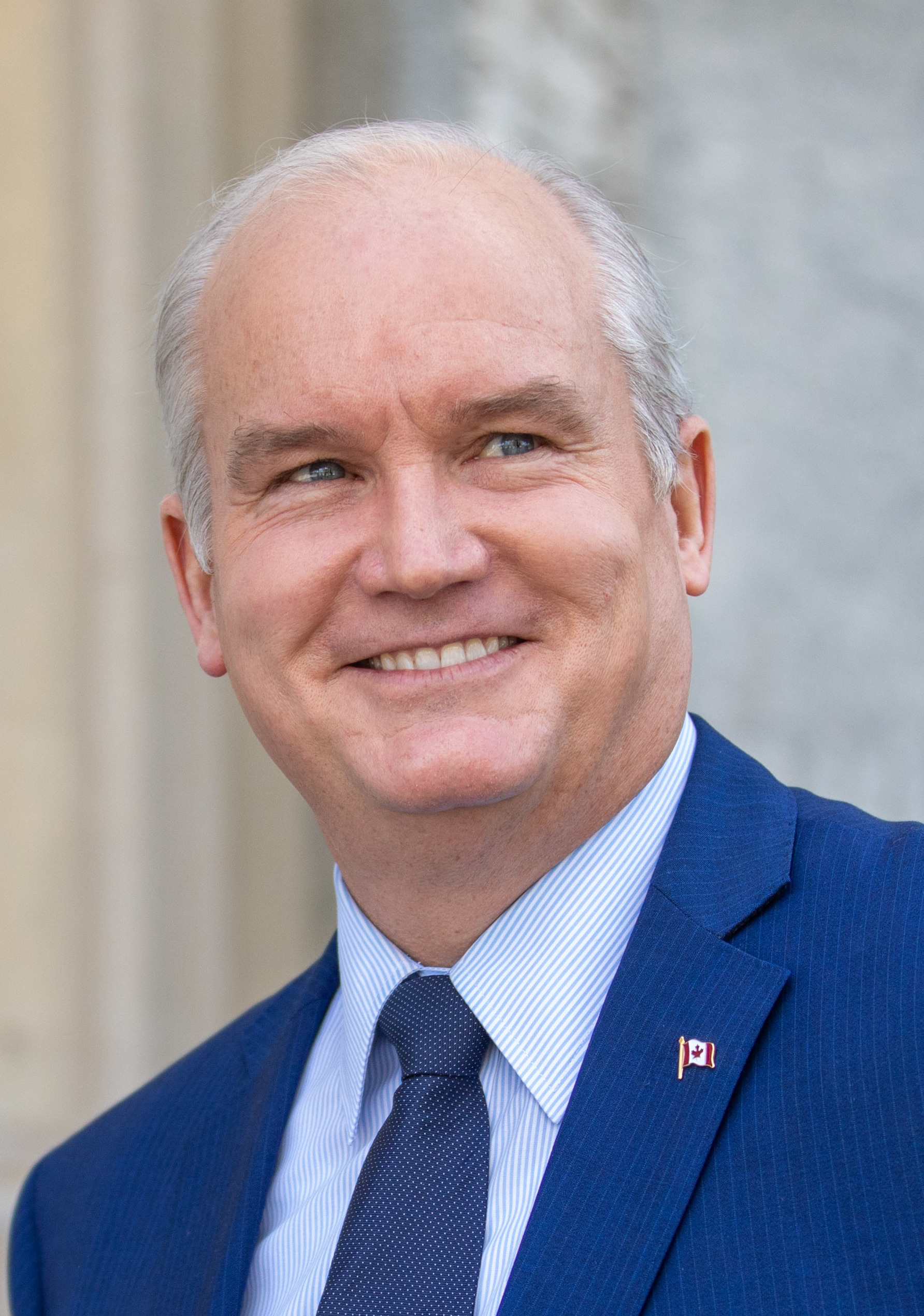
O'Toole in 2021

Following the start of the 2021 election campaign, O'Toole released a platform with the slogans "Secure the Future" in English and "Agir Pour L'Avenir" (English translation: Act for the Future) in French. The opening paragraphs of the 160-page document include a statement that "It's time for Conservatives to take inequality seriously" The Conservatives described their platform as focusing on the economy, jobs, and recovery from the COVID-19 pandemic. In the final days of the campaign, he attempted to convince People's Party voters that a vote for it would split the vote and allow a Trudeau victory. O'Toole lost the election to Trudeau, who won another minority government, though he won his riding of Durham and a plurality of the popular vote. O'Toole stated on election night that he would stay on as leader.

==== Removal as leader ====
Shortly after the election, the party became divided on whether or not O'Toole should stay on as leader of the party. On November 15, Conservative senator Denise Batters called for a referendum on O'Toole's leadership, saying that O'Toole "flip-flopped on policies core to our party" including a carbon tax, firearm regulations and abortion. Conservative Party president Robert Batherson ruled that a referendum to call a leadership review was "not in order". Two days later, O'Toole responded by removing Denise Batters from the caucus, saying anyone "who's not putting the team and the country first, will not be part of this team."

On January 31, 2022, Conservative Calgary Heritage MP Bob Benzen submitted a letter with signatures from 35 Conservative MPs calling for a leadership review on O'Toole's leadership to the Conservative caucus chair, Scott Reid. In the letter, Benzen criticized O'Toole's reversal on repealing Liberal Prime Minister Justin Trudeau's carbon tax and assault weapons ban. On February 2, 2022, O'Toole was ousted as leader in a vote by Conservative MPs according to the terms of the Reform Act. By secret ballot, O'Toole was removed as leader by a margin of 73 votes to 45. The vote forced his removal, which took effect immediately. The Conservative Party of Canada named Candice Bergen as interim party leader.

Leadership review of Erin O'Toole
Confidence	45 / 118 (38%)
No confidence	73 / 118 (62%)

=== Post-leadership ===
In 2022, O'Toole expressed his belief that Chinese interference had played a role in the Conservative Party's loss during the 2021 Canadian federal election in an interview with Liberal MP Nathaniel Erskine-Smith on Smith's UnCommons podcast. O'Toole opined that interference by Chinese Communist Party linked outfits could have cost the Conservatives up to "eight or nine seats." In May 2023, the Canadian Security Intelligence Service informed O'Toole that he remained a target of the Chinese government due to his criticism of the Chinese Communist Party.

On March 31, 2023, O'Toole announced he would not seek re-election and would resign at the end of the parliamentary spring session. In his final speech to the House of Commons on June 12, 2023, O'Toole spoke out against political polarization and the influence social media has on it. O'Toole was succeeded as member of parliament in the federal riding of Durham by Conservative Jamil Jivani in March 2024.

== Post-political career ==
In June 2023, O'Toole became the president and managing director of risk advisory firm ADIT North America, which operates in Canada and Mexico as a branch of a French-based firm. In April 2026, Prime Minister Mark Carney named O'Toole, along with other former politicians and business and labour leaders, to an advisory committee to aid with CUSMA negotiations.

== Political positions ==
O'Toole has been described as tending to be one of the more moderate members of his party. He supports a more moderate Conservative Party and has denounced the far-right, stating that they do not belong in his party.

=== Domestic policy ===
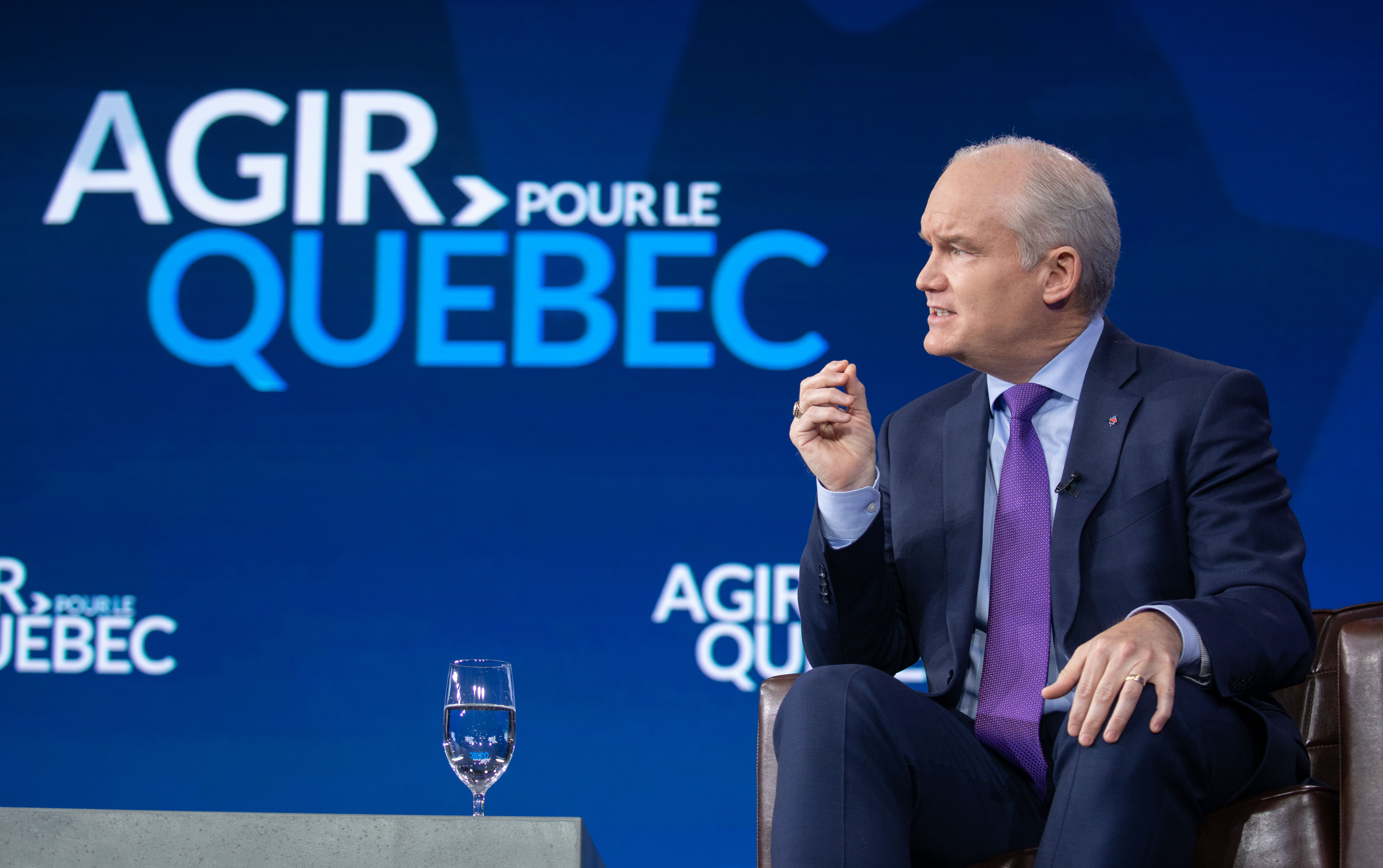
O'Toole speaking at an event in Ottawa, May 2021

O'Toole has stated that during the COVID-19 pandemic, the government should only spend what is necessary to help Canadians and balance the budget gradually over the next decade. O'Toole is against a national childcare program, saying that he prefers giving families more childcare options rather than one federal one. In his 2021 platform, he proposed to replace the current child care funding with tax credits for parents. He also opposes a national pharmacare program, saying that the government should not replace billions already spent by insurance companies.

He also wants to reduce and simplify taxes, arguing that a complicated tax system benefits the wealthy, who can afford to find loopholes. He supports modifying Canada's equalization and fiscal stabilization systems, which he argues are presently unfair to Alberta. O'Toole supports a full review of government spending and a program in which all new spending must be accompanied by an equivalent reduction in spending elsewhere. He has called for an incentive to reduce employment insurance premiums that small and medium-sized businesses pay for new employees.

O'Toole supports reviewing the mandate for the CBC's English digital and television operations, possibly converting it into a PBS-style public interest model to ensure it does not compete with the private sector. He argues the current competition with the private sector hurts other media companies, which is why he believes the $600-million print media bailout package would no longer be needed. He previously supported defunding these, being a major part of his 2020 Conservative leadership platform and popular with Conservative voters. He would not modify CBC Radio or its French language operations, stating they maintain their original public interest mandate. O'Toole previously supported modernizing the CBC without modifying funding.

To tackle Canada's housing crisis, O'Toole proposes to create one million new homes within three years, including converting at least 15 percent of federal buildings into housing space. He also supports banning foreign investors from buying Canadian homes for at least two years.

A "Canadian values" test, like the one proposed by Kellie Leitch, is not supported by O'Toole. During the COVID-19 pandemic, O'Toole has proposed increased immigration through family reunification to make up for a decreased number of economic immigrants. On illegal immigration, O'Toole supports creating a joint operation with the United States to stop asylum seekers from entering Canada illegally.

During the 2020 leadership election, O'Toole made a platform appealing specifically towards Quebec nationalists. O'Toole supports decentralizing the federal government's power in Quebec, having stated he is open to giving the province increased powers over immigration and opposing federal intervention to stop the Quebec ban on religious symbols, arguing that the independence of Quebec's legislature should be protected. He believes that large, federally regulated companies should be required to adhere to Quebec's Charter of the French Language.

==== Indigenous policy ====
O'Toole opposes the United Nations Declaration on the Rights of Indigenous Peoples, and said the Supreme Court of Canada has "set a higher bar on the so-called duty to consult." After statues of John A. Macdonald, Canada's first prime minister, were toppled in protests against systemic racism, O'Toole said that it would be "dooming Canada to forget its history" and that he preferred adding plaques to monuments describing a "more balanced look" of Canada's history instead of tearing them down. He had previously opposed the removal of a statue of Macdonald from Victoria's City Hall.

In November 2020, O'Toole gave a speech to young Conservative Party members at Ryerson University (now Toronto Metropolitan University) defending the university's namesake Egerton Ryerson. During the speech, he said the original goal of the Canadian Indian residential school system was "to provide education", but added that it became "a horrible program that really harmed people." In December 2020, he retracted his comments and stated Indigenous reconciliation is a priority for him.

==== Economic policy ====
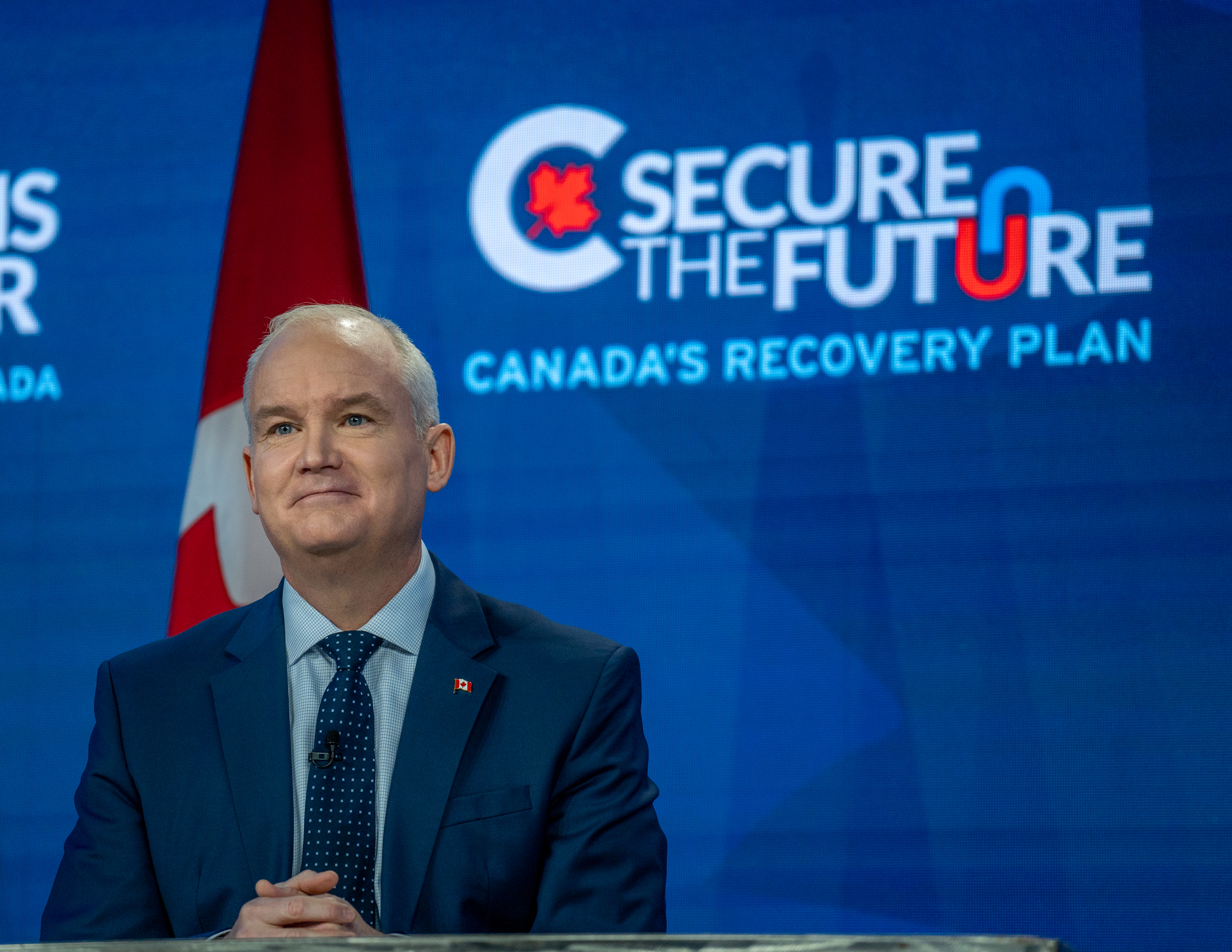
O'Toole during a press conference on the Conservative Party's post-pandemic recovery plan

During the COVID-19 pandemic, O'Toole released a post-pandemic recovery plan. He promised to launch a royal commission on the issue within 100 days of taking office and said the "big government" strategy failed Canadians. He has proposed converting the existing child care expense deduction to a refundable tax credit. He supported extending Employment Insurance for workers after the Canada Emergency Response Benefit (CERB) ran out in summer 2021. O'Toole believes the CERB should have been used more effectively by the government and focused on sectors hit hardest by the pandemic. He proposed expanding the emergency loan program for businesses and temporarily amending bankruptcy laws to make company restructuring easier.

O'Toole supports unions, calling them "an essential part of the balance between what was good for business and what was good for employees". He believes a lack of unions gives too much power to corporate elites, who he has said would be "too happy to outsource jobs abroad".

After an anti-pipeline movement sparked rail blockades across Canada, O'Toole promised to make it a specific criminal offence to block them as well as entrances to businesses, airports, and seaports, though some opponents believe it unfairly targets them. He also plans on introducing a law to ensure free trade between Canada's provinces.

==== Environmental policy ====
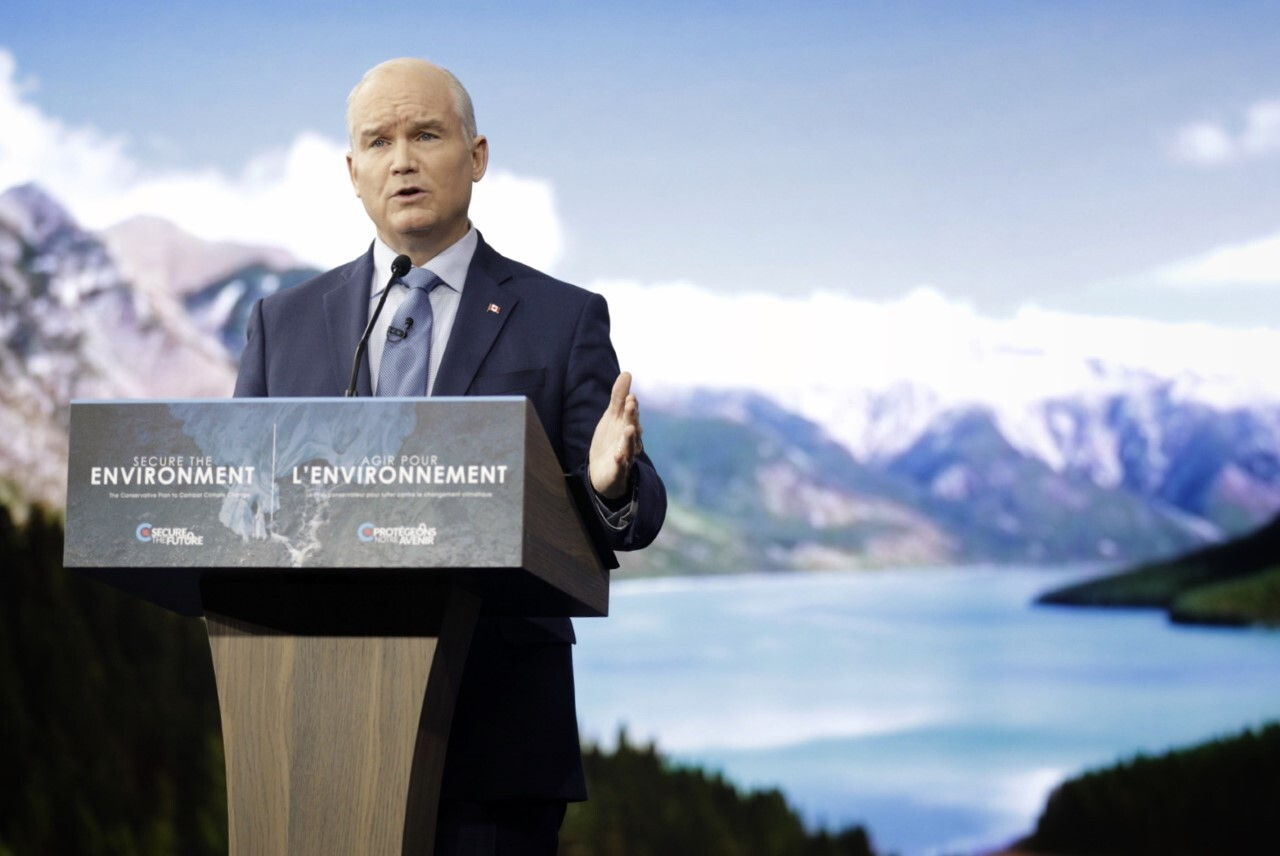
O'Toole speaking during a press conference on the Conservatives' environmental policy

On carbon pricing, O'Toole would create an alternative system in addition to the current federal carbon tax for consumers which would put a surcharge on carbon into a "low carbon savings account", a tax-free savings account to be used on purchases to make consumers more environmentally friendly. Provincial governments would be allowed to choose between the two systems. The surcharge O'Toole proposes is lower than that of the Trudeau government and O'Toole plans to offset that by other measures such as requiring 30 percent of light vehicles to be free of pollutants by 2030.

O'Toole's climate plan proposed to continue taxing industry and planned to raise the tax on industry as much as Trudeau intended to. He has said climate change is a global problem which requires a global solution. O'Toole committed to meeting Canada's Paris Agreement targets and has said he will partner with the provinces to do so. He supports net-zero emissions legislation as long as he considers it to "support Canadian industry" and has stated that he would like to partner with and pressure organizations to lower their emissions, including helping oil companies become carbon neutral. During his 2021 election campaign, O'Toole stated he would revert to earlier emissions targets, stating Trudeau has no plan to bring emissions down to more recent targets.

O'Toole supports ending Canada's energy imports from outside North America. He supports pipeline construction, arguing they "ignite" Canada's economy, though he has said that the proposed Energy East pipeline will not be constructed. He opposes the Oil Tanker Moratorium Act, the Impact Assessment Act and the Canadian Energy Regulator Act. He would introduce a National Strategic Pipelines Act to speed up approvals of pipelines deemed to be in Canada's national interest and repeal the related legislation introduced by the Trudeau government.

On March 20, 2021, O'Toole attempted to convince members to support a more serious agenda aimed at curbing climate change, saying that he did not want his candidates to be labelled as climate change deniers. Despite this, the party's base rejected a motion adding "we recognize that climate change is real. The Conservative Party is willing to act", with 54% of delegates voting against it.

==== Social issues ====
O'Toole's voting record on social issues has been described by The National Post as socially progressive. He is pro-choice on the matter of abortion, opposing legal restrictions on the practice, though he would hold free votes on bills related to abortion and other social issues. While he supports legislation which would allow health care practitioners to decline to offer treatment inconsistent with their philosophical views such as abortion stating they may be driven out of healthcare otherwise, he clarified that he believes they should be required to refer people to those services. O'Toole voted against bill C-14, which made euthanasia legal, saying he continued to have concerns about it and would prefer resources be focused on palliative care.

O'Toole supports same-sex marriage and has pledged to walk in pride parades under the condition that uniformed police officers can as well. He supports ending restrictions on men who have sex with men donating blood and banning conversion therapy.

O'Toole initially pledged to repeal all gun law changes made by the Trudeau government, though he later stated that the firearms banned in May 2020 would remain banned. However, the current firearms classification system would undergo public review.

Before recreational cannabis use was legalized, O'Toole supported its decriminalization and during his 2017 leadership campaign, he said that Trudeau's plan to legalize it would be impossible to reverse. O'Toole opposes harsh punishments for drug offences, instead supporting treating drug addiction as a health issue rather than a criminal issue. Law enforcement would focus more on traffickers under O'Toole's proposal and he plans on funding drug rehabilitation. Despite this, he does not support further drug legalization.

=== Foreign policy ===
According to political science professor Peter McKenna, O'Toole's foreign policy, especially that towards dictatorships and the United Nations, is similar to that of former prime minister Stephen Harper. He has criticized Liberals for being too friendly with dictatorships and paying too much attention to the UN. McKenna noted that O'Toole wants Canada to advocate for human rights internationally and will remove funding from UN agencies which he believes have failed from a corruption and human rights standpoint. He supports harsher punishments for Canadians participating in human rights abuses and proposes the creation of an international human rights committee.

O'Toole opposes cutting Canada's foreign aid budget though he has said he would look to fund programs leading to measurable outcomes similar to prior Conservative policies. He supports a CANZUK agreement, a political and economic union between Canada, the UK, Australia, and New Zealand, stating it will create more jobs for Canadians and help distance Canada from China. He supports a "Canada First" strategy to promote domestic production of goods and economic self-sufficiency but says he is not as much of a protectionist as the former US president, Donald Trump. He supports meeting Canada's NATO commitments. On Israel, he supports recognition of Jerusalem as the country's capital and plans to move Canada's Israeli embassy there from Tel Aviv.

==== China ====
O'Toole has spoken out against the Chinese government, singling it out as a bad actor on the international stage. He says there is a "growing influence of Chinese agents" in Canada meant to push Chinese propaganda and to intimidate Canadians. He supports passing a law similar to the Australian foreign interference law. He has proposed tightening up foreign investment groups to deter state-owned companies from non-free countries from buying Canadian resources and companies unless there is a compelling reason to approve. He supports a tougher stance on China and imposing sanctions on Chinese Communist Party officials involved with human rights violations using provisions of the Sergei Magnitsky Law. He opposes China's treatment of Uyghurs, saying that the 2022 Winter Olympics should be relocated from Beijing owing to concerns that the Chinese government is committing genocide against Uyghurs. He has come out in support of the Trump administration's hard-line approach to China.

O'Toole supports banning Huawei from Canada's 5G networks, stating China controls the company and has stolen technology from Nortel, a defunct Canadian company. He would give other providers tax credits to replace their infrastructure and apply pressure to other countries to stop allowing Chinese state-owned companies from accessing their markets and has called on the Trudeau government to expedite entry of political refugees fleeing Hong Kong.

Because of Canada's issues with the Chinese government, O'Toole seeks to improve relations with Taiwan and put "caveats" on the One-China policy. After Chinese Ambassador Cong Peiwu made remarks against Canada granting political asylum to pro-democracy protestors in Hong Kong, O'Toole said that it was a threat on Canadians and that he should be removed if he does not apologize for them.

== Personal life ==
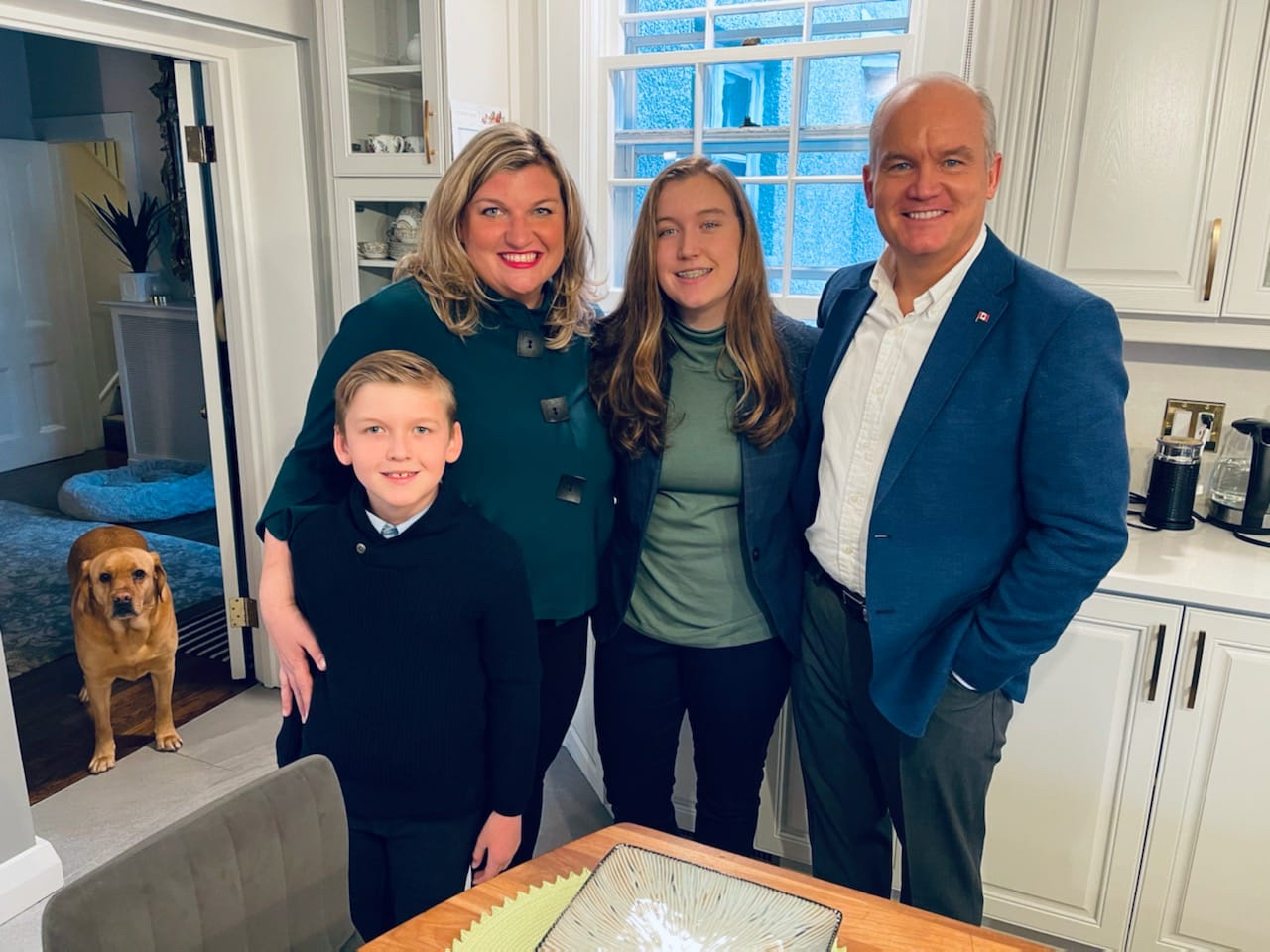
O'Toole and his family

O'Toole met his wife Rebecca in Halifax, Nova Scotia, in 1998, and they married in 2000. He has a daughter and a son. As of 2021 they lived near Bowmanville. O'Toole is a Catholic. He founded True Patriot Love, a nonprofit supporting veterans, members of the military, and their families.

== Awards and recognition ==
In 2012, O'Toole was awarded the Christopher J. Coulter Young Alumnus Award by Dalhousie University, for his achievements and dedication to community service.

Also in 2012, O'Toole received the Queen Elizabeth II Diamond Jubilee Medal. All serving MPs that year were recipients.

== Electoral record ==
2021 Canadian federal election: Durham
Party	Candidate	Votes	%	±%	Expenditures
Conservative	Erin O'Toole	31,423	46.39	+4.28	$112,775.26
Liberal	Jonathan Giancroce	20,267	29.92	–2.33	$56,079.34
New Democratic	Christopher Cameron	11,865	17.52	–0.73	$4,774.16
People's	Patricia Conlin	3,725	5.50	+3.51	$8,162.85
Independent	Sarah Gabrielle Baron	251	0.37	–	$2,215.46
Rhinoceros	Adam Smith	150	0.22	–	none listed
Independent	Kurdil-Telt Patch	49	0.07	–	none listed
Total valid votes/expense limit		67,730	99.33	–	$135,835.56
Total rejected ballots		455	0.67	+0.01	
Turnout		68,185	61.19	–6.80	
Eligible voters		111,428			
Conservative hold		Swing		+3.30	
Source: Elections Canada

2020 Conservative Party of Canada leadership results by ballot
Candidate	1st ballot				2nd ballot				3rd ballot			
Candidate	Votes cast	%	Points allocated	%	Votes cast	%	Points allocated	%	Votes cast	%	Points allocated	%
Erin O'Toole	51,258	29.39%	10,681.40	31.60%	56,907	33.20%	11,903.69	35.22%	90,635	58.86%	19,271.74	57.02%
Peter MacKay	52,851	30.30%	11,328.55	33.52%	54,165	31.60%	11,756.01	34.78%	63,356	41.14%	14,528.26	42.98%
Leslyn Lewis	43,017	24.67%	6,925.38	20.49%	60,316	35.20%	10,140.30	30.00%	Eliminated			
Derek Sloan	27,278	15.64%	4,864.67	14.39%	Eliminated							
Total	174,404	100%	33,800	100%	171,388	100%	33,800	100%	153,991	100%	33,800	100%

2019 Canadian federal election: Durham
Party	Candidate	Votes	%	±%	Expenditures
Conservative	Erin O'Toole	30,752	42.12	-3.01	$86,288.22
Liberal	Jonathan Giancroce	23,547	32.25	-3.50	$50,364.45
New Democratic	Sarah Whalen-Wright	13,323	18.25	+2.22	$3,348.10
Green	Evan Price	3,950	5.41	+2.89	none listed
People's	Brenda Virtue	1,442	1.97	–	$2,377.06
Total valid votes/expense limit		73,014	99.35		
Total rejected ballots		480	0.65	+0.29	
Turnout		73,494	67.99	-0.49	
Eligible voters		108,096			
Conservative hold		Swing		+0.25	
Source: Elections Canada

2017 Conservative Party of Canada leadership results by ballot
Candidate	Round 1		Round 2		Round 3		Round 4		Round 5		Round 6		Round 7		Round 8		Round 9		Round 10		Round 11		Round 12		Round 13	
Candidate	Points	%	Points	%	Points	%	Points	%	Points	%	Points	%	Points	%	Points	%	Points	%	Points	%	Points	%	Points	%	Points	%
Andrew Scheer	7,375.79	21.82%	7,383.69	21.85%	7,427.00	21.97%	7,455.34	22.06%	7,492.06	22.17%	7,597.28	22.48%	7,764.64	22.97%	8,061.08	23.85%	8,798.38	26.03%	9,557.67	28.28%	10,235.27	30.28%	12,965.47	38.36%	17,222.20	50.95%
Maxime Bernier	9,763.32	28.89%	9,823.57	29.06%	9,854.61	29.16%	9,922.23	29.36%	10,114.67	29.93%	10,208.33	30.20%	10,313.15	30.51%	10,557.48	31.24%	10,709.58	31.69%	11,570.59	34.23%	12,360.08	36.57%	13,647.14	40.38%	16,577.80	49.05%
Erin O'Toole	3,600.72	10.65%	3,609.15	10.68%	3,634.90	10.75%	3,669.07	10.86%	3,708.41	10.97%	3,769.09	11.15%	3,824.62	11.32%	4,181.26	12.37%	4,324.01	12.79%	4,947.86	14.64%	6,372.85	18.85%	7,187.38	21.26%		
Brad Trost	2,820.87	8.35%	2,826.57	8.36%	2,829.77	8.37%	2,834.43	8.39%	2,843.35	8.41%	2,852.31	8.44%	2,862.22	8.47%	2,883.76	8.53%	4,340.70	12.84%	4,633.83	13.71%	4,831.80	14.30%				
Michael Chong	2,552.47	7.55%	2,572.68	7.61%	2,583.56	7.64%	2,605.63	7.71%	2,618.63	7.75%	2,666.15	7.89%	2,692.83	7.97%	2,907.60	8.60%	2,939.29	8.70%	3,090.04	9.14%						
Kellie Leitch	2,366.09	7.00%	2,375.00	7.03%	2,383.03	7.05%	2,398.07	7.09%	2,430.25	7.19%	2,454.84	7.26%	2,516.67	7.45%	2,615.63	7.74%	2,688.03	7.95%								
Pierre Lemieux	2,495.71	7.38%	2,498.29	7.39%	2,503.92	7.41%	2,510.33	7.43%	2,518.29	7.45%	2,538.17	7.51%	2,561.77	7.58%	2,593.18	7.67%										
Lisa Raitt	1,127.93	3.34%	1,137.56	3.37%	1,164.85	3.45%	1,188.15	3.52%	1,208.97	3.58%	1,244.56	3.68%	1,264.10	3.74%												
Steven Blaney	426.37	1.26%	429.13	1.27%	433.00	1.28%	440.71	1.30%	448.37	1.33%	469.25	1.39%														
Chris Alexander	379.10	1.12%	385.01	1.14%	391.05	1.16%	407.47	1.21%	417.00	1.23%																
Kevin O'Leary	361.21	1.07%	364.74	1.08%	367.33	1.09%	368.56	1.09%																		
Rick Peterson	220.58	0.65%	223.09	0.66%	226.96	0.67%																				
Andrew Saxton	169.94	0.50%	171.50	0.51%																						
Deepak Obhrai	139.90	0.41%																								

2015 Canadian federal election: Durham
Party	Candidate	Votes	%	±%	Expenditures
Conservative	Erin O'Toole	28,967	45.13	−10.04	$117,180.89
Liberal	Corinna Traill	22,949	35.75	+20.22	$51,458.76
New Democratic	Derek Spence	10,289	16.03	−7.72	$21,240.10
Green	Stacey Leadbetter	1,616	2.52	−2.04	$109.90
Christian Heritage	Andrew Moriarity	364	0.57	–	$4,224.95
Total valid votes/expense limit		64,185	99.64		$236,417.96
Total rejected ballots		233	0.36	–	
Turnout		64,418	68.48	–	
Eligible voters		94,069			
Conservative hold		Swing		-15.13	
Source: Elections Canada

Canadian federal by-election, November 26, 2012: Durham Resignation of Bev Oda
Party	Candidate	Votes	%	±%	Expenditures
Conservative	Erin O'Toole	17,280	50.72	−3.82	$95,331
New Democratic	Larry O'Connor	8,946	26.26	+5.16	$96,257
Liberal	Grant Humes	5,887	17.28	−0.57	$91,946
Green	Virginia Ervin	1,386	4.07	−1.32	$742
Christian Heritage	Andrew Moriarity	437	1.28	+0.49	$4,379
Online	Michael Nicula	132	0.39	–	$1,080
Total valid votes		34,068	99.66		
Total rejected ballots		115	0.34	-0.12	
Turnout		34,183	35.72	-27.50	
Eligible voters		95,710			
Conservative hold		Swing		−4.49	
Source: Elections Canada

== Notes ==
Parliament of Canada
Preceded by Bev Oda	Member of Parliament for Durham; 2012–2023	Succeeded by Jamil Jivani
Political offices
Preceded by Julian Fantino	Minister of Veterans Affairs; 2015	Succeeded by Kent Hehr
Preceded by Andrew Scheer	Leader of the Opposition; 2020–2022	Succeeded by Candice Bergen
Party political offices
Preceded by Andrew Scheer	Leader of the Conservative Party; 2020–2022	Succeeded by Candice Bergen; Interim
