= Aurora—Oak Ridges—Richmond Hill =

Aurora—Oak Ridges—Richmond Hill could refer to:

- Aurora—Oak Ridges—Richmond Hill (federal electoral district)
- Aurora—Oak Ridges—Richmond Hill (provincial electoral district)
