= 2022 Conservative Party of Canada leadership election =

Party election in Canada

- September 10, 2022
- Opinion polls
- Turnout: 64.51% (▼0.5 pp)
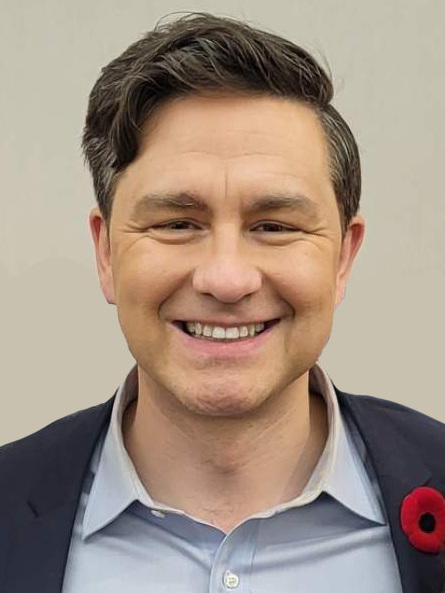

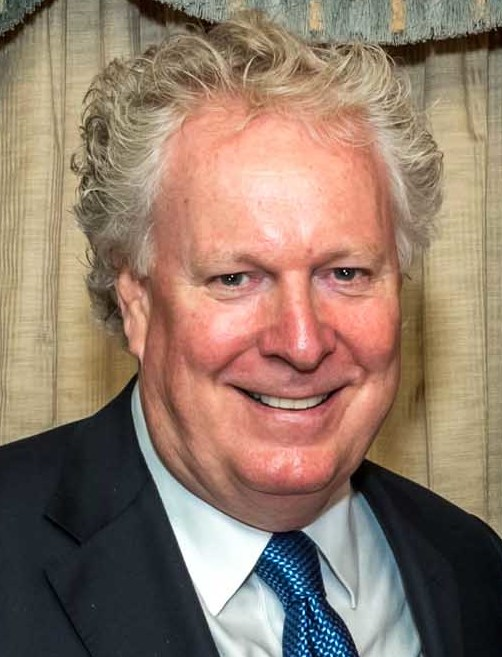
Candidate	Pierre Poilievre	Jean Charest
Popular vote	295,285	48,650
Percentage	(70.70%)	(11.65%)
Points	22,993.42 (68.15%)	5,421.62 (16.07%)
Previous Leader
Candice Bergen (interim)
Erin O'Toole (elected)
Elected Leader
Pierre Poilievre

2022 Conservative leadership election
- Date: September 10, 2022
- Convention: Shaw Centre, Ottawa
- Resigning leader: Erin O'Toole
- Won by: Pierre Poilievre
- Candidates: 6
- Entrance fee: $300,000, of which $100,000 is a refundable compliance deposit

In 2022, the Conservative Party of Canada held a leadership election to elect the successor to Erin O'Toole. He was removed on February 2, 2022, as leader by the party's caucus in the House of Commons of Canada by a vote of 73–45.

Five candidates were running for the position, including former Cabinet minister and Member of Parliament Pierre Poilievre, former Cabinet minister, former leader of the Progressive Conservative Party, and former Quebec Premier Jean Charest, Member of Parliament Leslyn Lewis, Member of Parliament Scott Aitchison, and Ontario Member of Provincial Parliament Roman Baber. Former member of parliament, former leader of the Progressive Conservative Party of Ontario, and Brampton, Ontario Mayor Patrick Brown also ran for the position, but was disqualified in early July due to his campaign's alleged violations of the financial provisions of the Canada Elections Act.

On September 10, it was announced that Poilievre won the leadership on the first ballot. This was the party's first leadership election since 2004 which resulted in a first-ballot victory.

After the race, the whistleblower who alleged violation on Brown's campaign was revealed to have their legal fees paid by the Poilievre campaign. In addition, there have been reports that Patrick Brown's bid in the leadership race was a target of foreign interference from the Indian government, due to his affiliation with Khalistani-separatist groups based in Canada. In March 2025, The Globe and Mail reported that according to the Canadian Security Intelligence Service, Indian agents had done some organizing on behalf of Poilievre, though they did not have evidence that any senior Conservatives were aware.

== Background ==
Following the 2021 Canadian federal election, the Conservative Party remained the Official Opposition with a loss of two seats, leaving it with 119 seats in the House of Commons. O'Toole announced that he had enough support to remain leader, and launched a review of the Conservative election campaign. James Cumming was selected to lead the review.

In November 2021, Senator Denise Batters launched an internal party petition to review O'Toole's leadership. Party president Robert Batherson quickly decided the petition was not in order. The following day, Batters was removed from the National Conservative Caucus, although she retained her membership in the Saskatchewan Conservative Caucus and the Conservative Senate Caucus.

In late January 2022, Cumming completed his review and briefed Conservative MPs and senators on his findings. His report blamed party staff for "over managing" O'Toole during the campaign, and said O'Toole needed to be more "authentic" and Conservatives failed to craft policy on some issues. In response to the report, O'Toole acknowledged that he needed to appear less "scripted" during the final days of the campaign.

On January 31, 2022, Conservative MP Bob Benzen submitted a letter with signatures from 35 Conservative MPs calling for a leadership review, pursuant to the Reform Act, of O'Toole's leadership to the Conservative caucus chair, Scott Reid. In the letter, Benzen criticized O'Toole's reversal on repealing Liberal Prime Minister Justin Trudeau's carbon tax and assault weapons ban.

This was the first time the Reform Act leadership-removal provisions were invoked. During the review, held on February 2, 2022, 45 MPs voted to retain him against 73 who voted for his removal. Immediately following his removal the Conservative caucus voted by secret ballot to appoint Candice Bergen as interim leader.

Leadership review of Erin O'Toole
Confidence	45 / 119 (38%)
No confidence	73 / 119 (61%)

In addition to Bergen, eight other caucus members sought to be appointed interim leader, including John Barlow, John Brassard, Kerry-Lynne Findlay, Marilyn Gladu, Tom Kmiec, Rob Moore and John Williamson.

== Timeline ==
=== 2020 ===
- August 23–24 – Erin O'Toole was elected as Conservative Party leader in the 3rd round of voting.

=== 2021 ===
- September 20 – The 2021 Canadian federal election was held. The Conservative Party remained the Official Opposition with a loss of two seats, leaving it with 119 seats in the House of Commons.
- October 5 – O'Toole announced that he intended to remain leader and launched post election review of the Conservative campaign.
- November 15 – Senator Denise Batters launched a petition to review the leadership of Erin O'Toole. Party president Robert Batherson decided the petition was not in order. The following day, Batters was removed from the national Conservative caucus, although her memberships were retained in the Saskatchewan Conservative caucus and in the Conservative Senate caucus.

=== 2022 ===
- January 27 – The post election review was completed. Its author, James Cumming, briefed Conservative MPs and Senators on his findings.
- January 31 – 35 Conservative MPs submitted a letter to the Conservative caucus chair, triggering the leadership review, pursuant to the Reform Act.
- February 2 – Conservative Members of Parliament voted to remove Erin O'Toole as party leader by a vote of 73 to 45. The caucus chose deputy leader Candice Bergen as interim leader.
- February 5 – Pierre Poilievre announced his candidacy.
- February 9 – Senator Denise Batters is reinstated in the National Conservative Party caucus.
- March 8 – Leslyn Lewis announced her candidacy.
- March 9 – Roman Baber, Joseph Bourgault, and Jean Charest announced their candidacies.
- March 13 – Patrick Brown announced his candidacy.
- March 16 – Scott Aitchison announced his candidacy.
- March 18 – Bobby Singh announced his candidacy.
- March 20 – Marc Dalton announced his candidacy.
- March 26 – Leona Alleslev announced her candidacy.
- March 28 – Joel Etienne announced his candidacy.
- March 29 – Grant Abraham announced his candidacy.
- April 4 – The Conservative Party confirmed to Postmedia that Leslyn Lewis met the requirements to become a verified candidate.
- April 12 – The Conservative Party announced that Jean Charest and Pierre Poilievre met the requirements to become verified candidates.
- April 19 – Deadline to announce leadership candidacy
- April 26 – The Conservative Party announced that Roman Baber and Patrick Brown met the requirements to become verified candidates.
- April 28 – The Conservative Party announced that Scott Aitchison met the requirements to become a verified candidate
- April 29 – Deadline to submit all endorsement signatures, full registration fee, and full compliance deposit in order to become a verified candidate and appear on the ballot
- May 2 – The Conservative Party announced that the final verified candidates were Scott Aitchison, Roman Baber, Patrick Brown, Jean Charest, Leslyn Lewis, and Pierre Poilievre.
- May 5 – Canada Strong and Free Network debate.
- May 11 – First Official Candidates' debate (English).
- May 25 – Second Official Candidates' debate (French).
- June 3 – Deadline to sign-up new members;
- June 30 – Candidates given preliminary list of party membership and given until midnight July 4 to challenge any names.
- July 5 – Patrick Brown is disqualified by the Leadership Election Organizing Committee on the recommendation of the party's chief returning officer after receiving information on alleged violations of the financial provisions of the Canada Elections Act by Brown's campaign.
- Early July – Ballots started going out to eligible Conservative party members
- September 6 – Ballots need to be completed and returned by 5 pm EDT
- September 10 – Ballots counted, Pierre Poilievre was elected the new leader of the Conservative Party with 68% of the points on the first round

== Rules and procedures ==
On March 8, 2022, the party's Leadership Election Organizing Committee released the Rules and Procedures for the 2022 Leadership document. As in the previous two leadership elections, the vote was held under instant-runoff voting in which each electoral district was given 100 points, distributed according to the weight of a candidate's vote in that electoral district. Should no candidate have received more than 50% of the points in a round, the candidate with the lowest amount of points was removed and their points were reallocated to the next highest choice on the ballots that had selected them. Voting was only open to members of the Conservative Party of Canada who had joined the party on or before June 3. Conservative Party membership was open to any Canadian Citizen or Permanent Resident aged 14 or older.

To be considered as a candidate, a member of the party had to apply by April 19 to the Leadership Candidate Nominating Committee with a completed Leadership Contestant Questionnaire, a written endorsement of the party's Code of Conduct policy document, and a $50,000 deposit. Then the member had until April 29 to provide the remaining $150,000 registration fee, a $100,000 security deposit (related to providing financial filings and adherence to the Rules and Procedures document), and 500 signatures of endorsement from party members (which must span at least 30 Electoral Districts in 7 provinces). The document limited expenses to $7,000,000 and prohibited accepting contributions from non-residents and foreign entities. Ballots were mailed to Conservative party members in late July or early August with the results being released on September 10. Media coverage of the 2022 race has described it as "the most expensive-to-enter race in Canadian history".

== Campaign ==
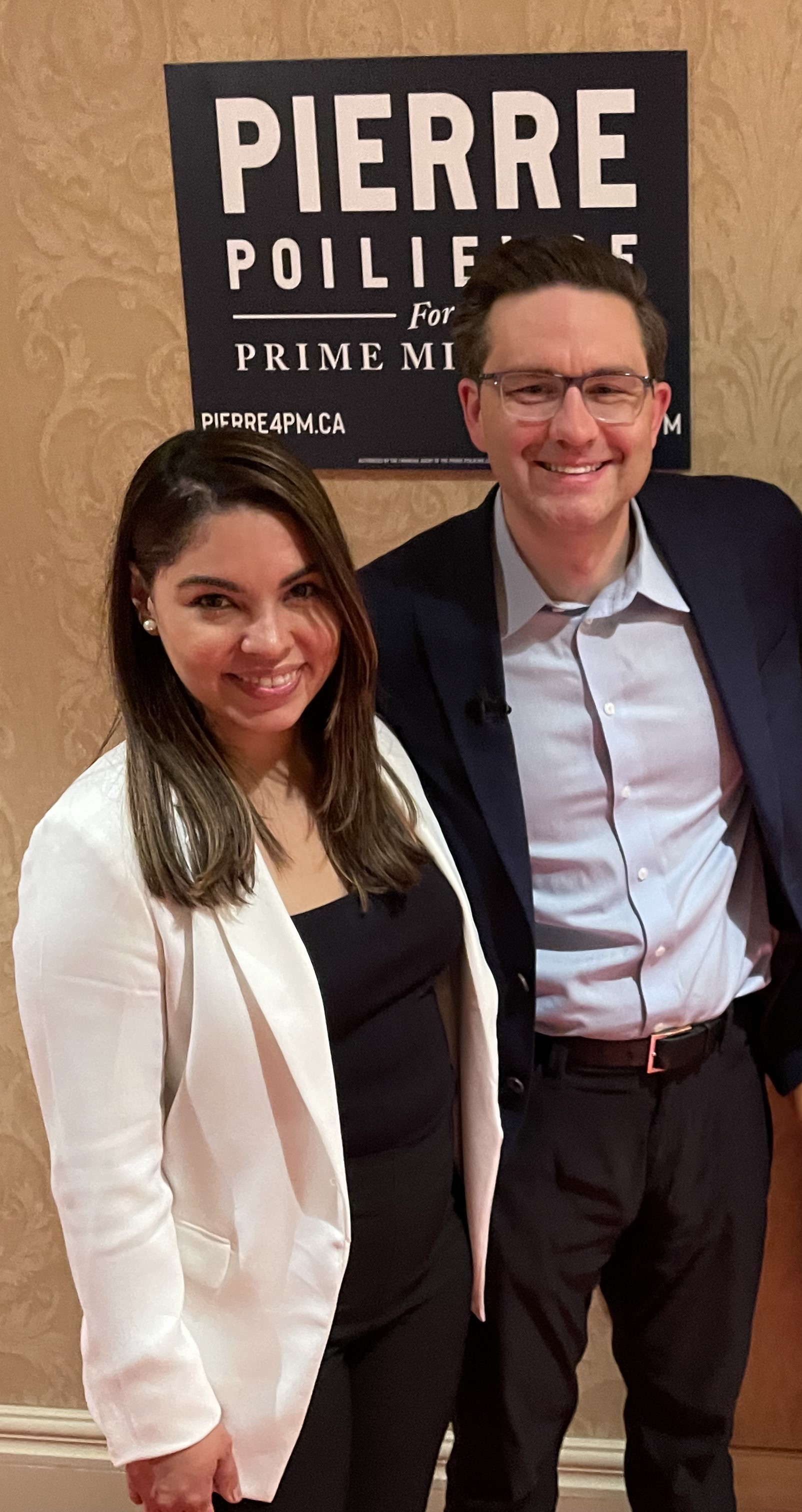
Pierre Poilievre and his wife, Anaida Poilievre, at a campaign rally in April 2022

On March 30, 2022, concerns arose that the party's membership lists may have been compromised and used to make fake donation pledges. Melanie Paradis, a former staffer to Erin O'Toole, posted a warning to Twitter about the alleged breach, saying that she was contacted about a $120 donation pledge she never made. Laurence Toth, spokesman for the Charest campaign, said someone had made numerous false donations pledges using a Ukrainian IP address, saying it was an "obvious attempt to create chaos" for the campaign. The party has denied that members' data had been compromised but is investigating the incidents.

In early April, Charest raised the prospect that Poilievre's support for the Freedom Convoy protests in Ottawa – as expressed in a 10 February podcast during which Poilievre said "I'm proud of the truckers and I stand with them," – disqualified him from being party leader. In response to Charest's comments, Poilievre said Charest was "repeating Liberal lies about truckers" and stated that Charest's consulting work for Huawei "sold out Canada's security" and disqualifies him from becoming prime minister.

On April 12, 2022, Poilievre raised concerns of potential fraud through the use of prepaid credit cards to purchase party memberships. A lawyer for his campaign sent a letter to the leadership election organizing committee demanding that it prohibit the use of prepaid cards to purchase memberships, and saying the campaign would take "appropriate steps to require the party comply" if it did not receive an "acceptable response" in a few days. The use of prepaid credit cards for the leadership election was banned on April 14.

On July 5, 2022, Patrick Brown was disqualified from the race by the party's Leadership Election Organizing Committee. In a statement, Ian Brodie, the chair of the committee, said that the disqualification was recommended by the party's chief returning officer after receiving information on alleged violations of the financial provisions of the Canada Elections Act by Brown's campaign.

=== Aftermath ===
In September 2022, after the results were announced, Conservative Senator Jean-Guy Dagenais expressed his protest against Poilievre's victory by tearing up his party membership card, criticizing his political style.

In July 2023, the Toronto Star later revealed that the volunteer who notified the party of the alleged violations by Brown's campaign, had her legal fees paid by the Poilievre campaign. Brown described the move as "dirty" but still supported the party.

In June 2024, National Security and Intelligence Committee of Parliamentarians released a report stating that there was foreign interference in this leadership race by the governments of India and China. The Toronto Star reported that foreign interference done by the government of India and also Sri Lanka due to their opposition to Patrick Brown and his relationships with their diaspora.

In March 2025, The Globe and Mail reported that the Canadian Security Intelligence Service found that Indian agents raised money and organized on behalf of Poilievre amid the South Asian diaspora, though neither extensively nor in a particularly organized way. The effort was part of a campaign seeking to gain support from politicians in all parties. CSIS did not have evidence that any senior Conservatives were aware of the effort. Subsequently, Poilievre was not provided this information because he was the only one of the federal party leaders to decline an offer from the government to get the necessary security clearance.

== Candidates ==
=== Verified ===
Candidate	Positions held	Candidacy	Policies
Scott Aitchison	MP for Parry Sound-Muskoka (2019–present), Shadow Minister for Labour (2021–2022) and Mayor of Huntsville, Ontario (2014–2019).	Announced: March 16, 2022 Approved: March 25, 2022 Verified: April 28, 2022 Campaign website: Campaign slogan: The Right Approach Campaign slogan (French): La bonne approche	Economic: Aitchison says he would end the supply management of dairy, eggs and poultry. Environment and Climate Change: Aitchison opposes a carbon tax. Housing: Aitchison's "YIMBY Plan To Build More Homes for Canadians" proposes increasing the supply of housing, ending exclusionary zoning in big cities, tying municipal funding to requirements to build more housing, increasing the number of skilled labourers, investing in affordable and social housing, and cracking down on money laundering. Defence: Aitchison calls for Canada to meet its NATO defence spending target of 2% of GDP and Aitchison says he disagrees with putting a no-fly zone on Ukraine. Social: Scott Aitchison is pro-choice on abortion and says he will defend a woman's right to choose abortion and "ensure that women have access to the resources they need to make their own informed reproductive healthcare decisions, without judgment."
Roman Baber	MPP for York Centre (2018–2022). Baber was elected as a member of the Progressive Conservative Party of Ontario, and sat as an independent MPP after January 15, 2021.	Announced: March 9, 2022 Approved: March 22, 2022 Verified: April 26, 2022 Campaign website: Campaign slogan: Change is Coming Campaign slogan (French): Le changement arrive	Defence: Baber says he disagrees with putting a no-fly zone on Ukraine because he does not want to escalate the war. Economic: Baber says he would end the supply management of dairy, eggs and poultry. According to a post on Twitter, Baber would seek to eliminate subsidies for news businesses. Health: Baber says he would launch a National Autism Plan, which would match provincial funding of autism treatment up to $500 million per year. Baber calls for the end of COVID-19 vaccine mandates, vaccine passports and other restrictions, has said that he would fire Chief Public Health Officer of Canada Theresa Tam for her COVID-19 response, and according to the Toronto Star has attacked the World Health Assembly's Pandemic Response Treaty during the campaign, claiming that it would erode Canada's sovereignty. Social: Baber opposes introduction of a universal basic income, believing that "it would create state dependency". Roman Baber is pro-choice on abortion and doesn't believe that government should have a role in how people "start and grow" their families.
Jean Charest	Premier of Quebec (2003–12), Leader of the Quebec Liberal Party (1998–2012), MNA for Sherbrooke (1998–2012), Leader of the Progressive Conservative Party of Canada (1993–98), Deputy Prime Minister of Canada (1993), Minister of Industry, Science and Technology (1993), Minister of Consumer and Corporate Affairs (1993), Minister of the Environment (1991–93), Minister of State (Fitness and Amateur Sport) (1988–90), Minister of State (Youth) (1986–90), and MP for Sherbrooke (1984–98).	Announced: March 9, 2022 Approved: March 21, 2022 Verified: April 12, 2022 Campaign website: Campaign slogan: Built To Win Campaign slogan (French): Bâti pour gagner	Defence: Charest would increase defence spending to reach the NATO target of 2% of GDP as "quickly as it can be responsibly done." Charest also says he would make the Canadian Armed Forces more inclusive for minorities, women and LGBTQIA members and he would force Canada's colleges and universities to allow Canadian Armed Forces recruitment centres on their campuses. Charest says he disagrees with putting a no-fly zone on Ukraine. Economic: Charest says he would balance the budget. Environment and Climate Change: Charest says he would repeal Bill C-69 and Bill C-48. Charest supports carbon pricing in Canada, but as of April 26 he said he would eliminate the federal carbon tax, eliminate the federal portion of the HST on "low-carbon purchases", respect the jurisdiction of the provinces to decide how to reduce their emissions and make industrial emitters pay a carbon price as part of an overall “heavier focus on industrial emissions.” He opposed the April 1 increase to the tax. He would expand investment into carbon capture and storage, nuclear reactors and hydrogen power. Health: Charest says decisions on federal COVID-19 vaccine mandates and COVID-19 mask mandates that remain in place should be made according to the advice of health professionals. Public safety: Charest says he would maintain the May 1, 2020 Order in Council ban on firearms, and other existing gun laws. Social: Charest would maintain childcare funding agreements reached with the provinces. He promises to increase parental leave to two years and allow pregnant women to access the federal child care benefit. He would provide additional childcare funding for children not enrolled in Liberals' program. Charest is pro-choice on abortion, and a government led by him will not introduce and will not pass laws to restrict abortion, but would allow MPs to introduce legislation on "matters of conscience", but without support.
Leslyn Lewis	MP for Haldimand—Norfolk (2021–present) and the third-place finisher in the 2020 Conservative Party of Canada leadership election.	Announced: March 8, 2022 Approved: March 22, 2022 Verified: April 4, 2022 Campaign website: Campaign slogan: Hope • Unity • Compassion Campaign slogan (French): Espoir • Unité • Compassion	Defence: In a post on Twitter, Lewis calls for increased military funding. Lewis says she disagrees with putting a no-fly zone on Ukraine because she does not want to escalate the war. Environment and Climate Change: Lewis says she would eliminate the federal carbon tax. Health: Lewis calls for the end of COVID-19 vaccine mandates and vaccine passports. According to both CBC News and the Toronto Star, Lewis has espoused conspiracy theories regarding the World Health Assembly's Pandemic Response Treaty during the campaign and has claimed that the treaty would "erode Canada's sovereignty". Social: Lewis is opposed to Bill 21 and calls it "religious discrimination". Lewis' campaign released a statement affirming her pro-life (anti-abortion) policies; specifically, she would increase funding for pregnancy centres and criminalize coerced abortions.
Pierre Poilievre	MP for Carleton (2015–25) and MP for the former riding of Nepean—Carleton (2004–15). Previously, Poilievre was the Shadow Minister of Finance (2017–21; 2021–22), Shadow Minister for Jobs and Industry (2021), Minister of Employment and Social Development (2015), and Minister of State for Democratic Reform (2013–15).	Announced: February 5, 2022 Approved: March 27, 2022 Verified: April 12, 2022 Campaign website: https://www.pierre4pm.ca/ Campaign slogan: Pierre Poilievre For Prime Minister Campaign slogan (French): Pierre Poilievre comme futur premier ministre	Defence: Poilievre says he disagrees with putting a no-fly zone on Ukraine because he does not want to escalate the war. Poilievre says he and a government led by him will support Ukraine by bringing Ukrainian refugees to Canada, by providing weapons and aid to Ukraine, by placing sanctions against Russia's oligarchs and commodities and by supplying Europe with Canada's energy to help reduce Europe's dependency on Russia's energy. Economic: Poilievre plans to address inflation by eliminating budget deficits with a pay-as-you-go law, which would require the government to offset any new spending with a cut elsewhere. Poilievre says a government led by him will increase the number of independent audits done on the Bank of Canada and will ban the Bank of Canada from implementing a central bank digital currency. Poilievre plans on replacing the Governor of the Bank of Canada, Tiff Macklem with someone "who would reinstate our low-inflation mandate and protect the purchasing power of the Canadian dollar". Poilievre says he will defund the CBC public broadcaster. Poilievre disagrees with ending the supply management of dairy, eggs and poultry and he says that ending the system would be too expensive. According to numerous commentators, including the Toronto Star's Raju Mudhar, Justin Ling speaking on a podcast and writing in the Toronto Star, The Cord's Marina Black and the Toronto Sun's Brian Lilley, Poilievre has espoused conspiracy theories regarding the World Economic Forum for saying that he opposes their proposed "great reset" and for him saying "I'm against their proposals; I'm against their socialist agenda; I'm against the proposals they've made." and because he plans to ban ministers and top government officials from attending the Forum's annual summit. Environment and Climate Change: Poilievre says he would repeal Bill C-69 and Bill C-48. Poilievre says he would eliminate the federal carbon tax. Poilievre says his plans to address climate change will focus on green technology and will allow provinces to pursue their own approach to lower emissions without forcing them to impose a tax like the carbon tax. One of the technologies Poilievre says he will incentivize to lower emissions is carbon capture and storage technology and he will make it a requirement for energy projects to be more safe for the environment. Another technology Poilievre plans to incentivize is a larger production of electric cars by greenlighting more mining of lithium, cobalt and copper required to produce them. Housing: Poilievre plans to force big cities to speed up building permits and increase construction by 15 percent in order to continue receiving full federal infrastructure money, compensate smaller cities that build extra housing, and reduce the governmental costs required to build houses and apartments. Poilievre says a government led by him will sell off the under-utilized 15 percent of the government's 37,000 buildings in order to convert those buildings into affordable housing. Health: Poilievre plans to address healthcare shortages by ensuring provinces expedite the approval of professional credentials of certified immigrants to increase the number health care workers, such as nurses. Poilievre calls for the end of federal COVID-19 vaccine mandates and COVID-19 mask mandates and claims that they are based on "political science" for being enforced federally in provinces with no provincial mandates. Poilievre calls for the end of vaccine passports and says he will review and reexamine the Emergencies Act to prevent it from being abused for political purposes. Public safety: Poilievre opposes re-establishing the long-gun registry, and opposes the May 1, 2020 Order in Council ban on firearms. Social: Poilievre and his campaign promises affordable day-care and to expand day-care options for all parents but before he releases his policies for childcare Poilievre says he wants to wait and see if the Liberal's policies are any different than the Liberal's previous policies. Poilievre is pro-choice on abortion, and says a government led by him will not bring forward and will not pass laws to restrict abortion, but he will allow his party to have free votes on legislation. Poilievre plans to repeal Bill C-11 and the successor to Bill C-36, describing them as censorship. Immigration: Poilievre has described himself as pro-immigration and aims to speed up processing times to get jobs filled. Poilievre aims to negotiate with the provinces to have immigrants credentials approved within 60 days and be provided with study loans if needed.

=== Disqualified ===
Candidate	Positions held	Candidacy	Policies
Patrick Brown	Mayor of Brampton (2018–present), Leader of the Progressive Conservative Party of Ontario (2015–18), Ontario Leader of the Official Opposition (2015–18), Barrie City Councillor (2000–06), MP for Barrie (2006–15), MPP for Simcoe North (2015–17).	Announced: March 13, 2022 Approved: April 8, 2022 Verified: April 26, 2022 Disqualified: July 5, 2022 Campaign website: Campaign slogan: Fighter. Leader. Winner. Campaign slogan (French): Un battant. Un chef. Un gagnant.	Defence: According to a post on Twitter, Brown says he will ensure Canada meets its NATO defence spending target of 2% of GDP, and has said that he would actively push for a no-fly zone on Ukraine. Environment and Climate Change: Brown previously supported the carbon tax but as of April 29 he says "it was not the right approach". He has said conservatives need to be part of the climate change response, but said that the leader cannot impose a plan on the party without consultation. Brown has promised to hold party-wide consultations on the environment. Public safety: Brown stated that he would scrap the Firearms act entirely and "...replace it with a new law that takes protecting our streets just as seriously as (it) does defending the rights of Canadians." Social: Brown calls for the repeal of Quebec's Bill 21, which prohibits the wearing of religious symbols by certain public servants and contractors of the province. Brown has also said he will implement "tax credits and direct contribution" for extended family members who help raise children, but has not yet released details of his childcare policies. Brown is pro-choice on abortion, and while he encourages alternatives to abortion, he "will not change Canada's abortion laws. Period." In a statement paraphrasing Bill Clinton, Brown shared his beliefs that abortion should be "safe, legal, and, in my personal opinion, rare."

=== Withdrew or failed to qualify ===
==== Failed to qualify as verified contestants ====
Approved applicants who failed to qualify as verified candidates.

Grant Abraham

Grant Abraham, is a lawyer, columnist and unsuccessful candidate in the 2019 United Kingdom general election in the constituency of Strangford, where he stood for the Northern Ireland Conservatives. Abraham attended high school in Abbotsford, British Columbia, before completing bachelor's degree in business and English at Trinity Western University. He completed a law degree at Queen's University Belfast. Abraham announced his candidacy on March 29, 2022. His candidacy was approved on April 27, 2022, and on April 30, 2022, he was said to have met the requirements and was awaiting verification. On May 2, 2022, it was announced he did not meet qualifications. Abraham later said that he had met the financial and signature requirements, but that after submitting his application he was told that he had been "deemed ineligible" by the party. He has asked the party for clarification on why he was disqualified.

Leona Alleslev

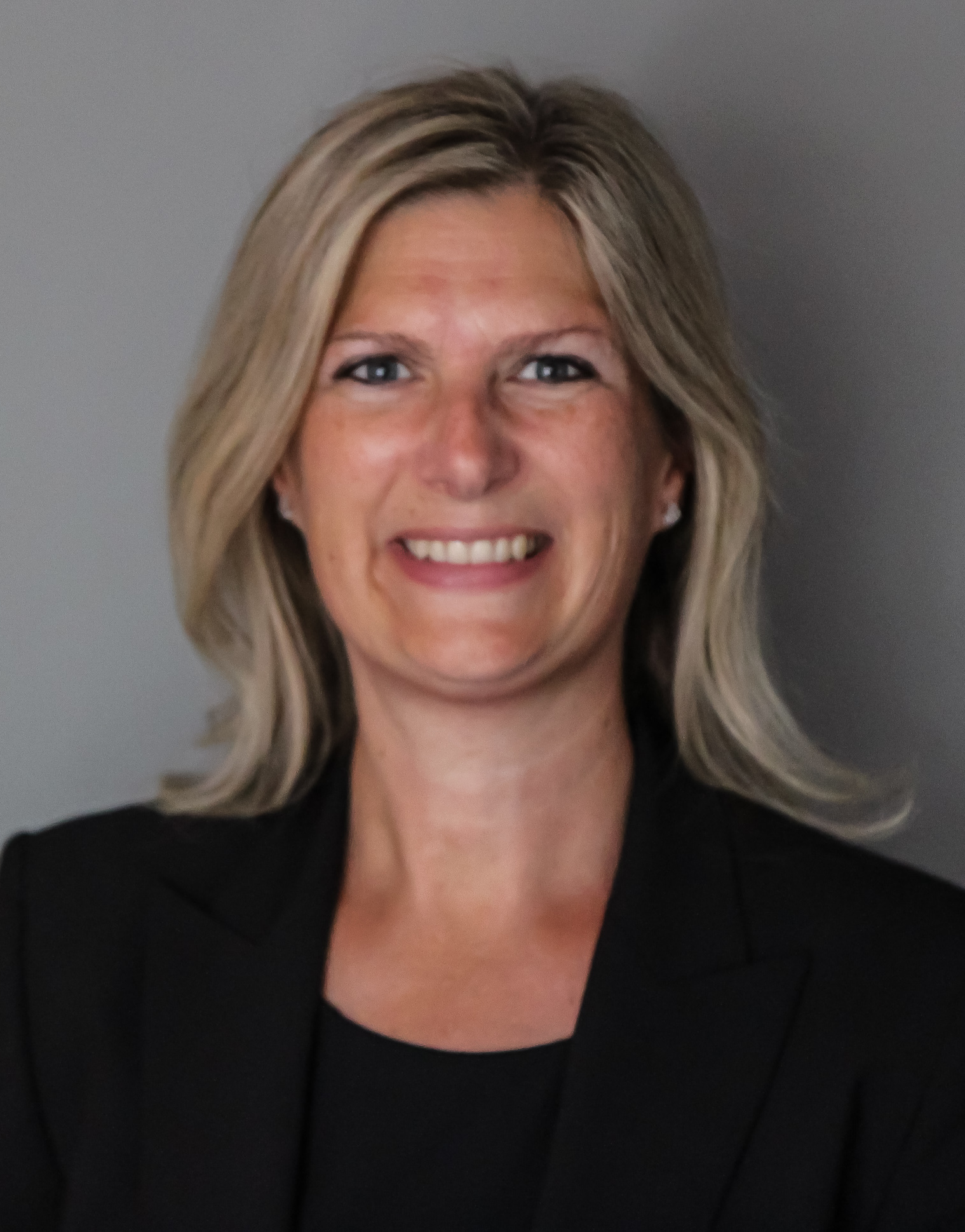
Leona Alleslev

Leona Alleslev, 54, is the former Deputy Leader of the Conservative Party of Canada (2019–2020), and former MP for Aurora—Oak Ridges—Richmond Hill (2015–2021). Before entering politics, Alleslev was an air force officer and corporate manager, having worked for IBM and Bombardier. She launched a campaign website on March 26, 2022, before becoming an approved contestant in mid-April. At the time, her campaign manager, Steve Gilchrist, said that they had collected the required signatures for Alleslev to become a verified contestant, but that the fundraising requirement of $300,000 was a "very high bar" which needed to be met in "very short time frame". He said it may be designed to exclude candidates from the leadership election. On April 29, 2022, Alleslev announced that she was withdrawing from the leadership election having failed to raise $300,000 required to pay the entry fee and deposit by that deadline. Alleslev had called for a significant increase to Canada's defence spending.

Joseph Bourgault

Joseph Bourgault, CEO of Bourgault Tillage Tools and founder of Canadians for Truth. He lives in St. Brieux, Saskatchewan. Bourgault announced his candidacy on March 9, 2022. He was approved on April 22, 2022. On April 28, 2022, Bourgault claimed to have raised $400,000 and received 1,000 signatures, and was waiting for final approval from the party. However, on May 2, 2022, it was announced he did not meet qualifications. Bourgault had said on social media that he had met the financial and signature requirements.

Marc Dalton

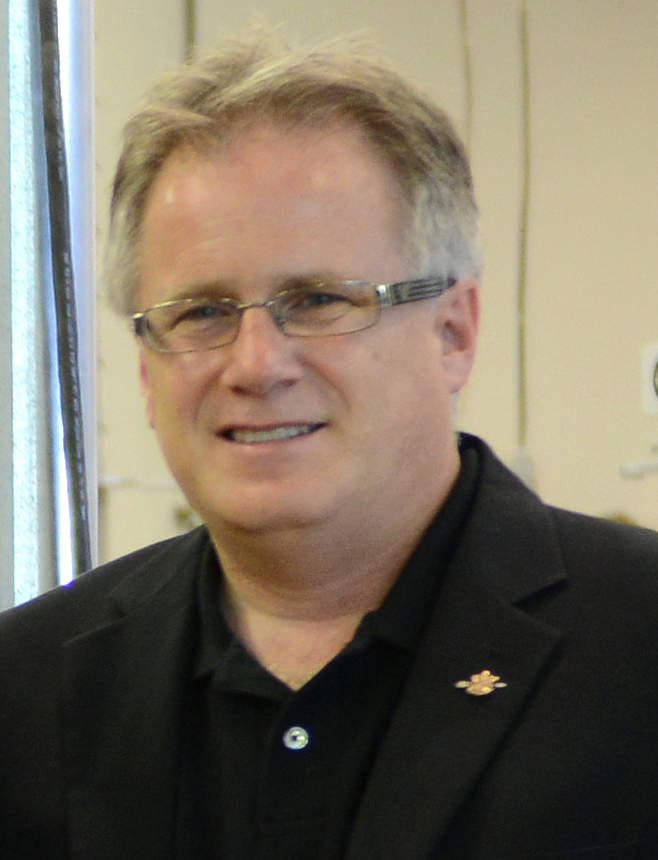
Marc Dalton

Marc Dalton, 61, MP for Pitt Meadows—Maple Ridge (2019–present), MLA for Maple Ridge-Mission (2009–2017). Before entering politics, Dalton was a teacher in British Columbia. He identifies as of French and Métis heritage. Dalton is bilingual in English and French. He announced his candidacy on March 20, 2022. On April 17, 2022, he was approved as a candidate. On April 29, 2022, it was announced that he failed to qualify as a verified candidate. Dalton said he needed "just a bit more time" to raise the necessary funds. He endorsed Leslyn Lewis for leader.

Joel Etienne

Joel Etienne, is a lawyer, movie producer, and 2021 candidate in York Centre. He also ran as a candidate for the Canadian Alliance in the 2000 election in Eglinton—Lawrence. He is originally from New Brunswick, and graduated from the University of Moncton. He announced his candidacy on March 28, 2022. His candidacy was approved on April 28, 2022, and on April 29, 2022, Etienne claimed to have met all of the party's requirements. However, on May 1, 2022, it was announced that Etienne did not meet the requirements and failed to become a verified candidate. Etienne later said that he had met the financial and signature requirements. He is seeking clarification from the on why he was disqualified, but says that he faced "racialized stereotypes" and questions about association with Falun Gong. He endorsed Jean Charest for leader.

==== Failed to qualify as approved applicants ====
Bobby Singh

Bobby Singh, is a Toronto-based businessman who was the party's candidate for Scarborough—Rouge Park, Ontario in the 2019 election. Singh briefly sought the Conservative leadership in 2020 but withdrew early after failing to satisfy the application criteria. On March 18, 2022, Singh announced his candidacy for the 2022 leadership election. By April 29, 2022, he had failed to become an approved contestant.

=== Declined ===
Rona Ambrose	Interim Leader of the Conservative Party of Canada and Leader of the Official Opposition (2015–2017), MP for Sturgeon River—Parkland (2015–2017) and Edmonton—Spruce Grove, Alberta (2004–2015), Minister of Health (2013–2015), Minister of Public Works and Government Services (2010–2013), Minister of Labour (2008–2010), Minister of Intergovernmental Affairs (2007–2008), Minister of the Environment (2006–2007)
Maxime Bernier	Leader of the People's Party (2018–present), Shadow Minister of Innovation, Science and Economic Development (2015–2016, 2017–2018), Minister of State for Small Business, Tourism and Agriculture (2011–2015), Minister of Foreign Affairs (2007–2008), and Minister of Industry (2006–2007), MP for Beauce, Quebec (2006–2019), runner-up in the 2017 leadership election.
Michael Chong	Shadow Minister of Foreign Affairs (2020–present), Shadow Minister of Science (2018–2019), Shadow Minister of Infrastructure and Communities (2017–2018), Shadow Minister of Urban Affairs (2017–2018), Deputy Shadow Minister of the Environment (2015–2016), Minister of Intergovernmental Affairs (2006), Minister of State (Sport) (2006), MP for Wellington—Halton Hills, Ontario (2004–present), 2017 leadership candidate.
Doug Ford	Premier of Ontario (2018–present), Leader of the Progressive Conservative Party of Ontario (2018–present), MPP for Etobicoke North (2018–present), member of the Toronto City Council (2010–2014)
Marilyn Gladu	Shadow President of the Queen's Privy Council for Canada (2020–2021), Shadow Minister of Health (2017–2020), MP for Sarnia—Lambton (2015–present), 2020 permanent and 2022 interim leadership candidate. Endorsed Poilievre.
Garnett Genuis	Shadow Minister of International Development (2020–present), Shadow Minister of Multiculturalism (2019–2020), MP for Sherwood Park—Fort Saskatchewan (2015–present)
Vincenzo Guzzo	Entrepreneur, philanthropist, and television personality. Endorsed Charest.
Stephen Harper	Prime Minister of Canada (2006–2015), Leader of the Conservative Party of Canada (2004–2015), Leader of the Canadian Alliance (2002–2003), MP for Calgary Southwest/Calgary Heritage (2002–2016), MP for Calgary West (1993–1997). Endorsed Poilievre.
Jason Kenney	Premier of Alberta (2019–2022), Leader of the United Conservative Party (2017–2022), Leader of the Progressive Conservative Association of Alberta (2017), and Alberta MLA for Calgary-Lougheed (2017–present), Minister of National Defence (2015), Minister of Employment and Social Development (2013–2015), Minister of Citizenship, Immigration and Multiculturalism (2008–2013), MP for Calgary Midnapore, Alberta (2015–2016) and Calgary Southeast, Alberta (1997–2015)
Tasha Kheiriddin	Political columnist for Postmedia, and author. Endorsed Charest.
Peter MacKay	Deputy Leader of the Conservative Party of Canada (2004–2015), Leader of the Progressive Conservative Party of Canada (2003), Minister of Justice and Attorney General (2013–2015), Minister of National Defence (2007–2013), Minister of Foreign Affairs (2006–2007), MP for Central Nova (1997–2015) and runner-up in the 2020 leadership election
Scott Moe	Premier of Saskatchewan (2018–present), Leader of the Saskatchewan Party (2018–present), Saskatchewan MLA for Rosthern-Shellbrook (2011–present)
Ben Mulroney	Television presenter and son of former prime minister Brian Mulroney
Caroline Mulroney	Minister of Transportation of Ontario (2018–present), Minister of Francophone Affairs (2018–present), Attorney General of Ontario (2018–2019), MPP for York—Simcoe (2018–present) and daughter of former Prime Minister Brian Mulroney
Kevin O'Leary	Businessman, investor, television personality and 2017 Conservative Party of Canada leadership election candidate. Endorsed Charest.
Lisa Raitt	Deputy Leader of the Conservative Party of Canada and Deputy Leader of the Official Opposition (2017–2019), Shadow Minister of Finance (2015–2016), Minister of Transport (2013–2015), Minister of Labour (2010–2013), Minister of Natural Resources (2008–2010), President and CEO of the Toronto Port Authority (2002–2008), MP for Milton, Ontario (2015–2019) and Halton, Ontario (2008–2015), and 2017 leadership candidate.
Michelle Rempel Garner	Shadow Minister for Natural Resources (2021–present), Shadow Minister for Health (2020–2021), Minister of Western Economic Diversification (2013–2015) and MP for Calgary Nose Hill (since 2011). Endorsed Brown.
Andrew Scheer	Shadow Minister of Infrastructure and Communities (2020–present), MP for Regina—Qu'Appelle (2004–present), former leader of the Conservative Party of Canada and Leader of the Official Opposition (2017–2020), Speaker of the House of Commons (2011–2015). Endorsed Poilievre
Brad Wall	Premier of Saskatchewan (2007–2018), Leader of the Saskatchewan Party (2004–2018), Saskatchewan MLA for Swift Current (1999–2018)

== Endorsements ==
Candidate	Current politicians				Former politicians				Other prominent individuals	Organizations	Media	Total
Candidate	Members of Parliament	Senators	Provincial politicians	Municipal politicians	Former MPs	Former Senators	Former provincial politicians	Former municipal politicians	Other prominent individuals	Organizations	Media	Total
Verified candidates
Scott Aitchison	1	–	–	–	–	–	–	–	–	–	–	1
Roman Baber	–	–	–	–	1	–	–	–	–	–	–	1
Patrick Brown	1	2	1	1	3	1	–	–	–	–	–	9
Jean Charest	16	8	8	1	15	6	19	3	4	–	–	79
Leslyn Lewis	10	–	–	–	6	–	2	–	2	1	–	21
Pierre Poilievre	62	7	37	–	19	2	5	2	8	–	1	143
Failed to qualify
Grant Abraham	–	–	–	–	–	–	–	–	–	1	–	1
Leona Alleslev	–	–	–	–	–	–	1	–	–	–	–	1
Joseph Bourgault	–	–	–	–	1	–	–	–	1	1	–	3
Marc Dalton	–	–	–	–	–	–	–	–	–	1	–	1
Joel Etienne	–	–	–	–	–	–	–	–	–	–	–	0
Bobby Singh	–	–	–	–	–	–	–	–	–	–	–	0

== Debates ==
Debates among candidates for the 2022 Conservative Party of Canada leadership election
No.	Date	Place	Host	Language	Participants — P Participant N Not invited A Absent invitee O Out of race (withdrawn or disqualified)						References
No.	Date	Place	Host	Language	Aitchison	Baber	Brown	Charest	Lewis	Poilievre	References
1	May 5, 2022	Ottawa, Ontario	Canada Strong and Free Network	English	P	P	A	P	P	P	
2	May 11, 2022	Edmonton, Alberta	Conservative Party of Canada	English	P	P	P	P	P	P	
3	May 25, 2022	Montreal, Quebec	Conservative Party of Canada	French	P	P	P	P	P	P	
4	May 30, 2022	Toronto, Ontario	Independent Press Gallery of Canada	English	Cancelled (Note: The debate was cancelled due to an insufficient number of candidates attending.)						
5	July 8, 2022	Calgary, Alberta	Western Standard	English	P	P	O	P	A	A	
6	August 3, 2022	Ottawa, Ontario	Conservative Party of Canada	Bilingual	P	P	O	P	A	A	

Canada Strong and Free Network invited all declared candidates to its debate, but only candidates who satisfied the party's verified criteria were ultimately permitted to attend. Dalton and Bourgault had agreed to attend the debate, but both failed to become verified contestants. Brown did not attend the first unofficial debate held by the Strong and Free Network.

The Independent Press Gallery of Canada debate was cancelled due to an insufficient number of candidates attending. Dalton had agreed to join the debate before he failed to qualify as a candidate. Baber, Charest, and Lewis had also agreed, but Aitchison, Brown, and Poilievre did not, and thus the debate was cancelled.

Leslyn Lewis did not attend the Western Standard debate due to a prior commitment.

Verified candidates are required to attend all official debates organized by the party's Leadership Election Organizing Committee. In April 2022, the committee advised candidates that they reserved the right to hold a third official debate in August. In July, the committee announced that it would be holding a third debate. Immediately following the announcement, Poilievre said he would not be attending the debate. A week later, Lewis announced that she would also not participate in the third official debate. Under the leadership election rules both face a fine of at least $50,000 if they do not attend.

In addition to the debates, there was also a candidate's forum held by seven Greater Toronto Area Conservative electoral district associations in Burlington, Ontario on May 1, 2022. All verified candidates were in attendance and gave six-minute speeches.

== Membership sales ==
Memberships sold through online portal
Candidate	Memberships (online portal)
Pierre Poilievre	311,958
Patrick Brown	62,308
Jean Charest	23,946
Leslyn Lewis	13,396

== Fundraising ==
2022 Conservative Party of Canada leadership election – Fundraising
Period	Scott Aitchison	Roman Baber	Patrick Brown	Jean Charest	Leslyn Lewis	Pierre Poilievre
Q1	$90,945	$53,987	$115,775	$490,088	$225,571	$545,298
Q2	$363,922	$504,650	$541,707	$1,376,492	$709,061	$4,042,717
Q3	$468,234	$608,134	$678,324	$2,534,890	$800,789	$5,100,345

== Opinion polling ==
=== Conservative Party supporters ===
Preferred leader

View source data.
Graph of opinion polls for verified candidates

Polling firm	Link	Last date of polling	Sample Size	Margin of error	Scott Aitchison	Roman Baber	Patrick Brown	Jean Charest	Leslyn Lewis	Pierre Poilievre	Other
Ipsos		August 31, 2022	235	–	5%	4%	–	18%	10%	44%	Don't know 19%
Leger		August 7, 2022	331	–	2%	1%	–	17%	6%	44%	Don't know 22% None 8%
Ipsos		July 13, 2022	259	–	5%	1%	–	23%	8%	34%	Don't know 29%
Leger		July 3, 2022	384	–	1%	1%	4%	14%	3%	48%	Don't know 26% None 3%
Mainstreet Research		June 24, 2022	12,647	–	2.7%	1.4%	2.1%	20.1%	12.5%	52.6%	Undecided/Unsure 8.7%
Angus Reid		June 13, 2022	1,398	–	1%	1%	7%	14%	6%	57%	None of them 14%
Leger		June 12, 2022	389	–	1%	2%	4%	14%	3%	44%	Don't know 23% None 8%
Narrative Research		May 19, 2022	–	–	4%	1%	10%	14%	4%	45%	None 21%
EKOS		May 9, 2022	–	–	–	–	8%	15%	6%	58%	Other 11% Don't know 2%
EKOS		May 4, 2022	237	± 6.37%	–	–	9.0%	13.8%	6.7%	56.5%	Other 11.6% Skip 2.4%
Ipsos		April 19, 2022	264	–	1%	1%	4%	14%	4%	32%	Don't know 37% Alleslev 4% Dalton 1% Singh 1%
Leger		April 10, 2022	377	–	0%	1%	5%	18%	2%	43%	Don't know 24% None 4% Dalton 1%
Probit Inc.		April 4, 2022	2,966	± 1.8%	1%	1%	6%	18%	6%	66%	–
Angus Reid	PDF	March 15, 2022	–	–	–	–	5%	15%	9%	54%	Michael Chong 6% None of them 10%
Leger		March 6, 2022	358	–	–	–	3%	10%	2%	41%	Tasha Kheiriddin 1% Peter MacKay 9% Don't know/Refusal 33%
Leger		February 6, 2022	367	–	–	–	3%	1%	3%	26%	Doug Ford 10% Rona Ambrose 6% Peter MacKay 5% Maxime Bernier 4% Andrew Scheer 4% Brad Wall 3% Michael Chong 1% Lisa Raitt 1% Someone else or None of these 10% Don't know 23%

=== All Canadians ===
Polling firm	Link	Last date of polling	Sample Size	Margin of error	Scott Aitchison	Roman Baber	Patrick Brown	Jean Charest	Leslyn Lewis	Pierre Poilievre	Other
Ipsos		August 31, 2022	1,001	± 3.5%	4%	5%	–	21%	6%	16%	Don't know 50%
Leger		August 7, 2022	1,509	± 2.52%	1%	1%	_	22%	4%	16%	Don't know 33% None 23%
Ipsos		July 13, 2022	1,001	± 3.5%	4%	2%	–	22%	4%	15%	Don't know 52%
Angus Reid		June 13, 2022	5,032	± 2%	1%	1%	8%	21%	3%	26%	None of them 39%
Leger		June 12, 2022	1,528	± 2.5%	1%	1%	6%	14%	2%	18%	Don't know 31% None 27%
Narrative Research		May 19, 2022	1,234	–	2%	2%	8%	20%	3%	18%	None 47%
EKOS		May 9, 2022	2,128	± 2.1%	–	–	10%	25%	5%	23%	Other 28% Don't know 10%
EKOS		May 4, 2022	771	± 3.5%	–	–	10.8%	23.8%	4.7%	21.9%	Other 28.9% Skip 10.0%
Ipsos		April 19, 2022	1,001	± 3.5%	1%	2%	4%	13%	3%	15%	Don't know 57% Alleslev 2% Dalton 2% Singh 2%
Leger		April 10, 2022	1,538	± 2.5%	0%	1%	4%	16%	3%	18%	Don't know 37% None 19% Alleslev 1%
Angus Reid	PDF	March 15, 2022	5,105	± 2%	–	–	6%	20%	14%	25%	Michael Chong 6% None of them 30%
Leger		March 6, 2022	1,519	± 2.5%	–	–	3%	12%	2%	15%	Tasha Kheiriddin 2% Peter MacKay 10% Don't know/Refusal 55%
Leger		February 6, 2022	1,546	± 3%	–	–	2%	3%	1%	10%	Doug Ford 7% Peter MacKay 6% Rona Ambrose 4% Maxime Bernier 3% Andrew Scheer 2% Lisa Raitt 2% Michael Chong 1% Brad Wall 1% Someone else or None of these 19% Don't know 38%

==== Voting intention under each candidate ====
Polls were also conducted to garner the prospective voting intentions of the public for the various political parties under each leadership candidate in a general election. Generally, they demonstrated Charest taking more voters from the Liberal Party, but at the expense of losing CPC voters who would otherwise support the party under Poilievre as a then-hypothetical leader to the People's Party.

Last date of polling	Pollster/client	Sample size	Voting intention dependent on Conservative leader									
Last date of polling	Pollster/client	Sample size	Poilievre as leader					Charest as leader				
Last date of polling	Pollster/client	Sample size	CPC	LPC	NDP	Others	Lead	CPC	LPC	NDP	Others	Lead
July 18, 2022	Angus Reid	1,268	34%	29%	22%	16% (Note: 7% for BQ, 4% for GPC, 3% for PPC, 2% for Other)	5	34%	24%	20%	21% (Note: 7% for PPC, 7% for BQ, 3% for GPC, 4% for Other)	10
July 18, 2022	Mainstreet Research	1,749	39.3%	27.1%	18.6%	14.9% (Note: 5.6% for BQ, 4.5% for PPC, 2.7% for GPC, 2.1% for Other)	12.2	35.2%	27.2%	19.3%	18.3% (Note: 7.7% for PPC, 4.9% for BQ, 2.5% for GPC, 3.2% for Other)	8
July 17, 2022	Abacus Data	1,500	29%	31%	21%	19% (Note: 9% for BQ, 5% for PPC, 5% for GPC)	2	25%	28%	22%	25% (Note: 11% for PPC, 9% for BQ, 5% for GPC)	3
April 10, 2022	Léger	1,538	29%	32%	21%	19% (Note: 7% for BQ, 6% for PPC, 4% for GPC, 2% for Others)	3	23%	32%	21%	24% (Note: 8% for PPC, 7% for BQ, 5% for GPC, 4% for Others)	9
March 6, 2022	Léger	1,591	30%	34%	21%	14% (Note: 8% for BQ, 3% for PPC, 3% for GPC)	4	28%	33%	20%	18% (Note: 8% for BQ, 7% for PPC, 3% for GPC)	5

== Results ==
On September 10, 2022, the Conservative Party announced that Pierre Poilievre had won the election in the first round with 68% of points.

First round (points allocated)
Poilievre	68.15%
Charest	16.07%
Lewis	9.69%
Baber	5.03%
Aitchison	1.06%

First round (votes cast)
Poilievre	70.7%
Charest	11.6%
Lewis	11.1%
Baber	5.4%
Aitchison	1.2%

Poilievre won the leadership election in a landslide, carrying 330 of 338 ridings with at least a plurality. In both points and vote, Poilievre won the largest share ever in a Conservative Party of Canada leadership election, eclipsing Stephen Harper, who won with 56% of points and 69% of the vote in 2004. Poilievre also eclipsed Harper's 2004 victory in terms of votes cast, winning with 70% of the vote. Polls before the announcement of results, from Ipsos and Leger, had shown him at 54% and 63% support respectively (both 44% when including undecideds) among Conservative Party supporters. This was also the first time since the 2004 leadership election that the winner was determined on the first ballot. Last Conservative leader Erin O'Toole won on the third round with 57% of points. The margin of his victory was also the largest in any seriously contested leadership election for a Canadian conservative party, exceeding the 66.7% of the delegated vote that George A. Drew had won while winning the leadership of the old Progressive Conservative Party in 1948; Charest had won 96% of the vote in 1995, but ran unopposed as one of only two MPs the party still had (the other, Elsie Wayne, declined to contest the leadership election) after the 1993 Canadian federal election.

The only other candidate to win a plurality in any ridings was Jean Charest, whose support disproportionately came from Quebec, which had fewer voting Conservative Party members than Western Canada; this allowed Charest to get, in turn, a slightly higher percentage of points than votes, though not as extremely disproportionate as Belinda Stronach's in 2004, who also received much support in the East. Despite this, Poilievre still won 72 of the province's 78 ridings. Charest won his former federal riding of Sherbrooke, all other candidates losing their ridings to Poilievre. (Note: Roman Baber's former provincial riding of York Centre is coterminous with the federal riding of York Centre. Poilievre also won both of Brown's former ridings, Barrie federally and Simcoe North provincially/federally.)

=== Provincial summary ===
First round results
Province	Riding pluralities				
Province	Jean Charest	Leslyn Lewis	Pierre Poilievre	Roman Baber	Scott Aitchison
Alberta	0 (0%)	0 (0%)	34 (100%)	0 (0%)	0 (0%)
British Columbia	0 (0%)	0 (0%)	42 (100%)	0 (0%)	0 (0%)
Manitoba	0 (0%)	0 (0%)	14 (100%)	0 (0%)	0 (0%)
New Brunswick	0 (0%)	0 (0%)	10 (100%)	0 (0%)	0 (0%)
Newfoundland and Labrador	0 (0%)	0 (0%)	7 (100%)	0 (0%)	0 (0%)
Nova Scotia	0 (0%)	0 (0%)	11 (100%)	0 (0%)	0 (0%)
Ontario	2 (1.61%)	0 (0%)	119 (98.39%)	0 (0%)	0 (0%)
Prince Edward Island	0 (0%)	0 (0%)	4 (100%)	0 (0%)	0 (0%)
Quebec	6 (7.69%)	0 (0%)	72 (92.31%)	0 (0%)	0 (0%)
Saskatchewan	0 (0%)	0 (0%)	14 (100%)	0 (0%)	0 (0%)
Territories	0 (0%)	0 (0%)	3 (100%)	0 (0%)	0 (0%)
Total	8 (2.37%)	0 (0%)	330 (97.63%)	0 (0%)	0 (0%)

Source: cpcleadership.ca

== See also ==
- 45th Canadian federal election
- 2022 Green Party of Canada leadership election
- 2022 United Conservative Party leadership election
- 2025 Liberal Party of Canada leadership election
