= Leona Alleslev =

Canadian politician (born 1968)

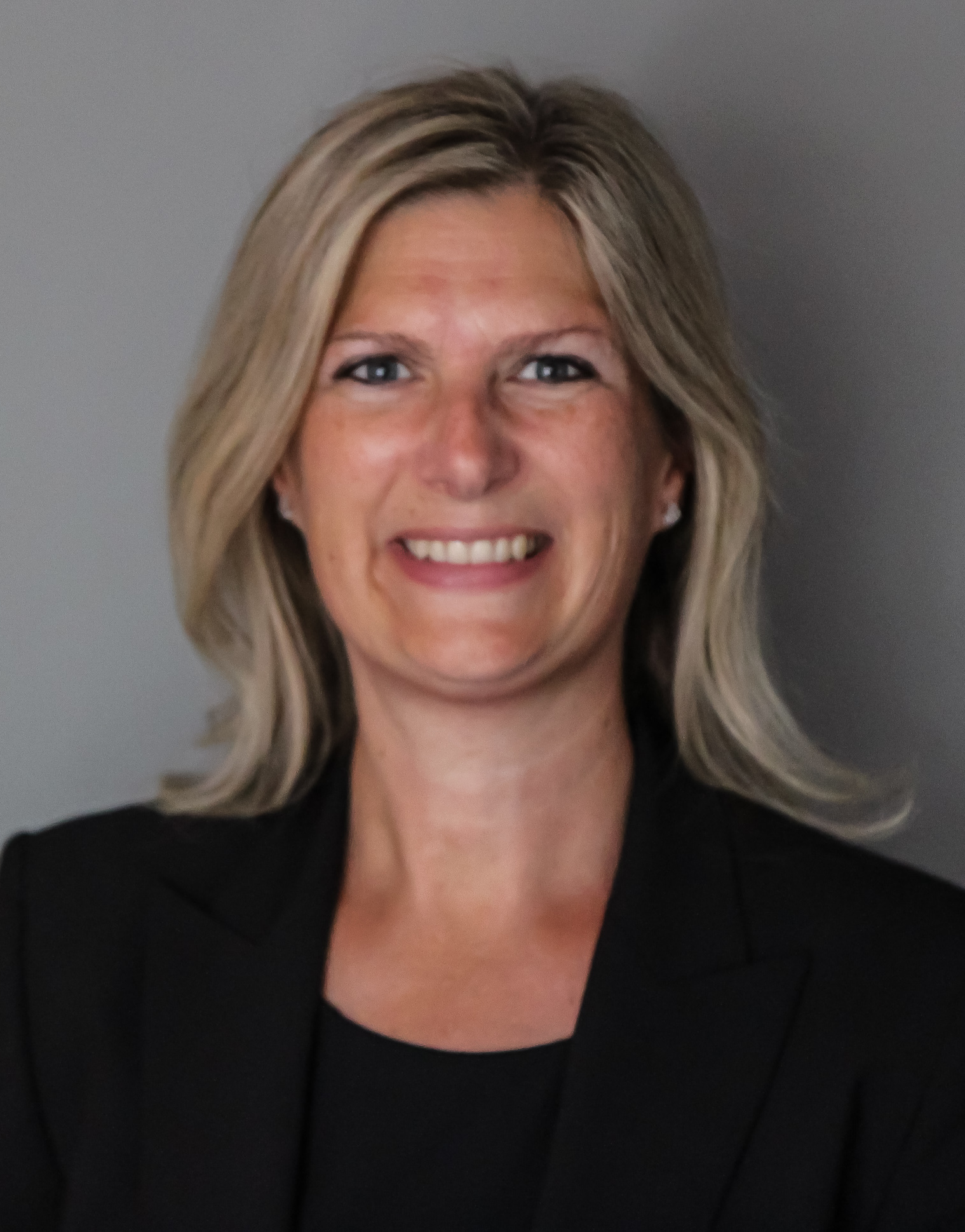
- Alleslev in 2017

Deputy Leader of the Opposition
- In office November 28, 2019 – July 12, 2020
- Leader: Andrew Scheer
- Preceded by: Lisa Raitt
- Succeeded by: Candice Bergen

Deputy Leader of the Conservative Party
- In office November 28, 2019 – July 12, 2020
- Leader: Andrew Scheer
- Preceded by: Lisa Raitt
- Succeeded by: Candice Bergen

Member of Parliament for Aurora—Oak Ridges—Richmond Hill
- In office October 19, 2015 – September 20, 2021
- Preceded by: District established
- Succeeded by: Leah Taylor Roy

Personal details
- Born: Leona Alleslev; March 16, 1968 (age 58)
- Party: Conservative (since 2018)
- Other political affiliations: Liberal (2014–2018)
- Spouse: Edward Krofchak (m. 1995)
- Education: Royal Military College (BA (Hons))
- Profession: Politician

Military service
- Allegiance: Canada
- Branch/service: Royal Canadian Air Force
- Years of service: 1987–1996
- Rank: Captain

Leona Alleslev-Krofchak (born March 16, 1968) is a Canadian politician and former military officer who served as the member of Parliament (MP) for Aurora—Oak Ridges—Richmond Hill. She was elected as a Liberal in the 2015 federal election, and crossed the floor to join the Conservative Party in 2018, citing disagreements with the Liberal government over their handling of economic and foreign affairs. On October 21, 2019, she was re-elected as a Conservative. Alleslev was defeated in the 2021 federal election.

Alleslev was a candidate in the 2022 Conservative leadership election. On December 15, 2024, Alleslev announced that she would be seeking the nomination for the federal Conservative Party candidate in the riding of Kingston and the Islands, but on January 26, 2025, she announced that she was ending that bid.

== Political career ==
=== Member of Parliament ===
Alleslev was elected as a member of the Liberal Party of Canada in the 2015 federal election, in the riding of Aurora—Oak Ridges—Richmond Hill. She crossed the floor to join the Conservative Party in September 2018.

After being re-elected as a Conservative following the 2019 election, Andrew Scheer appointed Alleslev as the deputy Opposition leader and deputy Conservative leader.

On July 12, 2020, Alleslev announced that she was stepping down as Deputy Leader. Alleslev expressed her interest in engaging in one of the leadership campaigns in the 2020 leadership race. On July 13, 2020, she endorsed Peter MacKay to be the next Conservative leader. Peter MacKay's campaign claims it did not cut a deal with her to get her endorsement and Alleslev stated that "My loyalty can’t be bought, it must be earned." She was succeeded as deputy leader by Candice Bergen.

=== 2022 Conservative leadership election ===
On March 24, 2022, Alleslev announced that she would be contesting the leadership election of the Conservative Party. On April 29, she withdrew from the contest after being unable to come up with the $300,000 registration fee.

== Electoral record ==
2021 Canadian federal election: Aurora—Oak Ridges—Richmond Hill
Party	Candidate	Votes	%	±%	Expenditures
Liberal	Leah Taylor Roy	20,764	45.24	+2.86	$102,230.88
Conservative	Leona Alleslev	19,304	42.06	-2.32	$96,732.68
New Democratic	Janice Hagan	3,594	7.83	+0.63	$25.50
People's	Anthony Siskos	1,734	3.78	+2.78	$1,630.40
Libertarian	Serge Korovitsyn	500	1.09	+0.09	$0.00
Total valid votes/expense limit		45,896	98.90	–	$113,842.33
Total rejected ballots		509	1.10		
Turnout		46,405	55.01	-9.39	
Eligible voters		84,361			
Liberal gain from Conservative		Swing		▲2.59	
Source: Elections Canada

2019 Canadian federal election: Aurora—Oak Ridges—Richmond Hill
Party	Candidate	Votes	%	±%	Expenditures
Conservative	Leona Alleslev	23,568	44.38	-0.81	$100,442.03
Liberal	Leah Taylor Roy	22,508	42.38	-4.96	$100,105.74
New Democratic	Aaron Brown	3,820	7.20	+1.49	$282.50
Green	Timothy Flemming	2,154	4.0	+2.72	$2,471.02
People's	Priya Patil	530	1.0		$500.00
Libertarian	Serge Korovitsyn	529	1.0		none listed
Total valid votes/expense limit		53,109	100.0		
Total rejected ballots		454			
Turnout		53563	64.4%		
Eligible voters		83156			
Conservative hold		Swing		+2.08	
Source: Elections Canada; CBC News

2015 Canadian federal election: Aurora—Oak Ridges—Richmond Hill
Party	Candidate	Votes	%	±%	Expenditures
Liberal	Leona Alleslev	24,132	47.34	+19.47	$76,512.44
Conservative	Costas Menegakis	23,039	45.19	−6.31	$150,877.75
New Democratic	Brenda Power	2,912	5.71	−10.24	$1,887.13
Green	Randi Ramdeen	654	1.28	−2.19	–
Animal Alliance	Kyle Bowles	243	0.48	–	$5,898.62
Total valid votes/expense limit		50,980	100.00		$212,912.36
Total rejected ballots		204	0.40	–	
Turnout		51,184	64.91	–	
Eligible voters		78,848			
Liberal notional gain from Conservative		Swing		+12.89	
Source: Elections Canada
