= Leah Taylor Roy =

Canadian politician

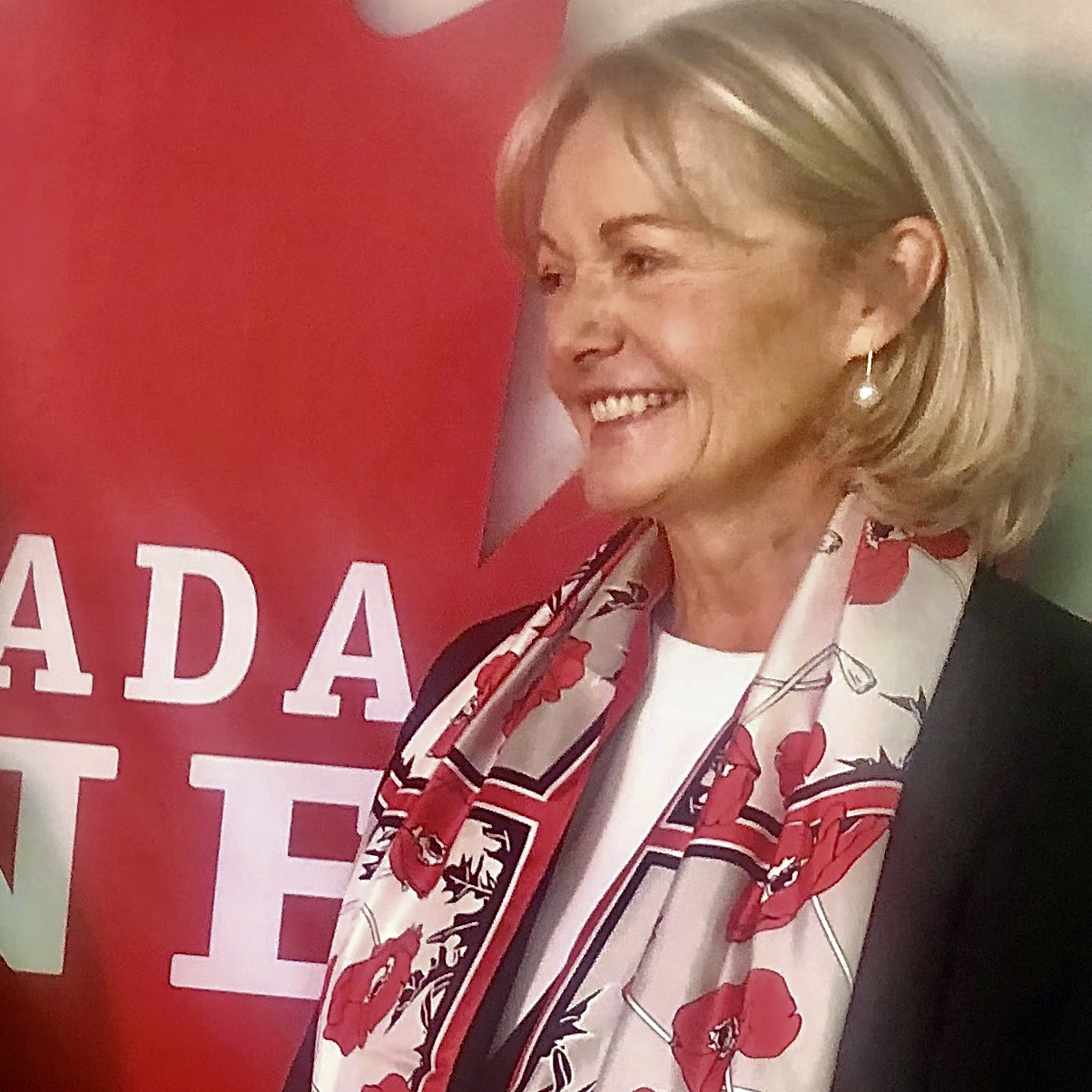
- Taylor Roy in 2021

Member of Parliament for Aurora—Oak Ridges—Richmond Hill
- In office September 20, 2021 – April 28, 2025
- Preceded by: Leona Alleslev
- Succeeded by: Costas Menegakis

Personal details
- Born: Leah Taylor; October 1960 (age 65) Newmarket, Ontario, Canada
- Party: Liberal
- Education: University of Toronto (BComm); Harvard University (Master of Public Policy)
- Occupation: Politician

Leah Taylor Roy (née Taylor; born 1960) is a Canadian politician. She served as the member of Parliament (MP) for Aurora—Oak Ridges—Richmond Hill in the House of Commons of Canada from 2021 to 2025 as a member of the Liberal Party.

== Early life and education ==
Taylor Roy was born in Newmarket, Ontario. She holds a Bachelor of Commerce from the University of Toronto and a Master of Public Policy from Harvard University.

== Professional career ==
Before entering politics, Taylor Roy worked at the World Bank, later as a consultant with McKinsey & Company, and then in a family-owned green-energy business.

== Political career ==
Taylor Roy ran as the Liberal candidate for the riding of Aurora—Oak Ridges—Richmond Hill in the 2019 federal election, but lost to Conservative incumbent Leona Alleslev. She ran again in the 2021 election, this time defeating Alleslev. In the 2025 election, she lost her seat to the Conservative candidate, Costas Menegakis.

At the time of the 2025 election, she lived in Aurora, Ontario.

== Electoral history ==
2025 Canadian federal election: Aurora—Oak Ridges—Richmond Hill
Party	Candidate	Votes	%	±%	Expenditures
Conservative	Costas Menegakis	34,023	54.73	+12.61	
Liberal	Leah Taylor Roy	26,590	42.77	−1.99	
New Democratic	Danielle Maniuk	835	1.34	−6.69	
Green	Tom Muench	465	0.75	+0.57	
People's	Igor Tvorogov	256	0.41	−3.46	
Total valid votes/expense limit		62,169	99.34	+0.44	
Total rejected ballots		410	0.66	-0.44	
Turnout		62,579	70.08	+15.70	
Eligible voters		89,302			
Conservative gain from Liberal		Swing		+7.30	
Source: Elections Canada
Note: number of eligible voters does not include voting day registrations.

2021 Canadian federal election: Aurora—Oak Ridges—Richmond Hill
Party	Candidate	Votes	%	±%	Expenditures
Liberal	Leah Taylor Roy	20,764	45.24	+2.86	$102,230.88
Conservative	Leona Alleslev	19,304	42.06	-2.32	$96,732.68
New Democratic	Janice Hagan	3,594	7.83	+0.63	$25.50
People's	Anthony Siskos	1,734	3.78	+2.78	$1,630.40
Libertarian	Serge Korovitsyn	500	1.09	+0.09	$0.00
Total valid votes/expense limit		45,896	98.90	–	$113,842.33
Total rejected ballots		509	1.10		
Turnout		46,405	55.01	-9.39	
Eligible voters		84,361			
Liberal gain from Conservative		Swing		+2.59	
Source: Elections Canada

2019 Canadian federal election: Aurora—Oak Ridges—Richmond Hill
Party	Candidate	Votes	%	±%	Expenditures
Conservative	Leona Alleslev	23,568	44.38	-0.81	$100,442.03
Liberal	Leah Taylor Roy	22,508	42.38	-4.96	$100,105.74
New Democratic	Aaron Brown	3,820	7.20	+1.49	$282.50
Green	Timothy Flemming	2,154	4.0	+2.72	$2,471.02
People's	Priya Patil	530	1.0		$500.00
Libertarian	Serge Korovitsyn	529	1.0		none listed
Total valid votes/expense limit		53,109	100.0		
Total rejected ballots		454			
Turnout		53563	64.4%		
Eligible voters		83156			
Conservative hold		Swing		+2.08	
Source: Elections Canada; CBC News
