= Richmond Hill South =

Federal electoral district in Ontario, Canada

Coordinates: 43.87°N 79.42°W

Ontario electoral district
- Interactive map of riding boundaries from the 2025 federal election

Federal electoral district
- Legislature: House of Commons
MP
Vincent Ho
Conservative
- District created: 2003
- First contested: 2004
- Last contested: 2025
- District webpage: profile, map

Demographics
- Population (2021): 114,180
- Electors (2021): 83,148
- Area (km²): 39.83
- Pop. density (per km²): 2,866.7
- Census division: York
- Census subdivision(s): Markham (part), Richmond Hill (part)

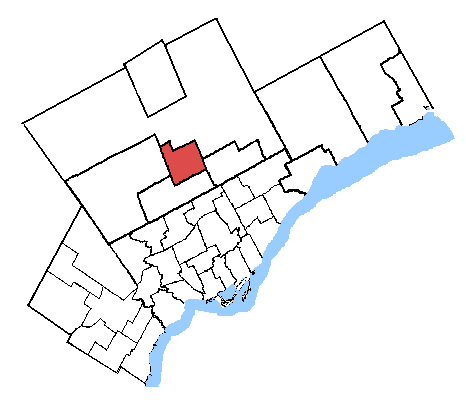
Richmond Hill riding from 2003 to 2015

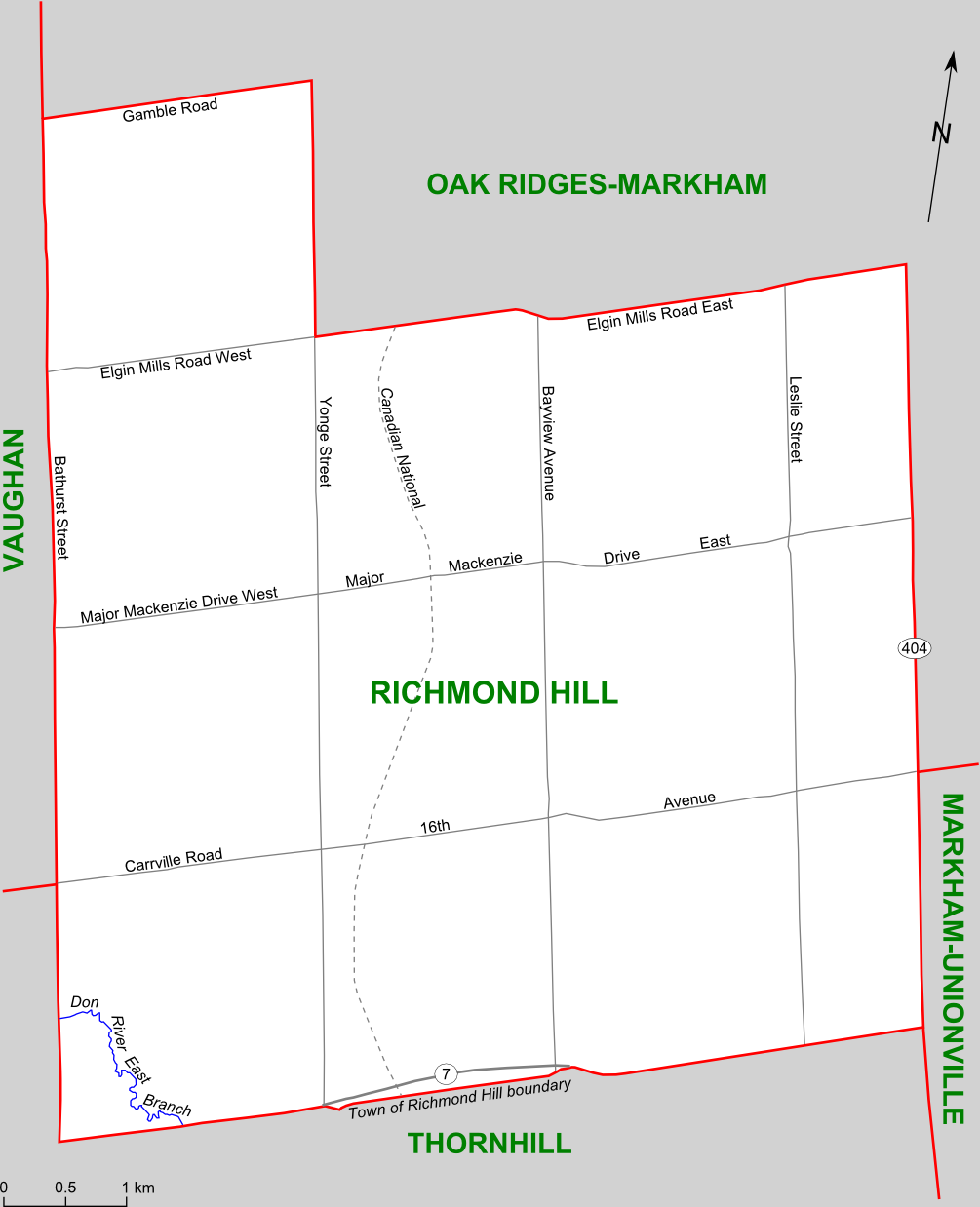
Map of Richmond Hill riding from 2003 to 2015

Richmond Hill South (French: Richmond Hill-Sud; formerly Richmond Hill) is a federal electoral district in Ontario, Canada, that has been represented in the House of Commons of Canada since 2004.

It was created in 2003 from parts of Oak Ridges riding.

Following the 2022 Canadian federal electoral redistribution, this riding was renamed Richmond Hill South at the 2025 Canadian federal election. It gained all of Aurora—Oak Ridges—Richmond Hill south of Elgin Mills Road (Rouge Woods area).

== Geography ==
The riding includes the neighbourhoods of Elgin Mills, Bayview North, Bayview South, North Richvale, Hillsview, Bayview Hill, South Richvale, Langstaff and Doncrest in the City of Richmond Hill.

The electoral district consists of parts of Richmond Hill. It also contains parts of the City of Markham.

== Demographics ==
According to the 2021 Canadian census; 2023 representation order

Racial groups: 34.6% Chinese, 30.9% White, 13.3% West Asian, 7.0% South Asian, 2.5% Korean, 2.4% Filipino, 2.3% Black, 1.4% Arab, 1.2% Latin American
Languages: 37.5% English, 14.1% Cantonese, 12.1% Persian, 12.1% Mandarin, 3.8% Russian, 2.5% Korean, 2.4% Italian, 1.2% Arabic, 1.2% Tagalog, 1.1% Spanish, 1.0% French
Religions: 39.0% Christian (17.8% Catholic, 4.7% Christian Orthodox, 1.3% Anglican, 1.2% United Church, 1.1% Baptist, 1.0% Presbyterian, 11.9% Other), 12.3% Muslim, 4.1% Jewish, 2.5% Hindu, 2.3% Buddhist, 38.5% No religion
Median income (2020): $35,600
Average income (2020): $54,950

== Riding associations ==
Riding associations are the local branches of the national political parties:

Party	Association name	CEO	HQ city
Conservative	Richmond Hill South Conservative Association	Carly A. Lyons-Rising	Whitchurch-Stouffville
Green	Richmond Hill South Green Party Association	Alison Y. Lam	Richmond Hill
Liberal	Richmond Hill South Federal Liberal Association	Glenn A. Loney	Richmond Hill
New Democratic	Richmond Hill South Federal NDP Riding Association	Adam DeVita	Richmond Hill

== Member of Parliament ==
This riding has elected the following members of the House of Commons of Canada:

Parliament	Years	Member	Party
Richmond Hill; Riding created from Oak Ridges
38th	2004–2006	Bryon Wilfert	Liberal
39th	2006–2008	Bryon Wilfert	Liberal
40th	2008–2011	Bryon Wilfert	Liberal
41st	2011–2015	Costas Menegakis	Conservative
42nd	2015–2019	Majid Jowhari	Liberal
43rd	2019–2021	Majid Jowhari	Liberal
44th	2021–2025	Majid Jowhari	Liberal
Richmond Hill South
45th	2025–present	Vincent Ho	Conservative

== Election results ==
Graph of general election results in Richmond Hill (minor parties that never got 2% of the vote or didn't run consistently are omitted) View source data.

2025 Canadian federal election
Party	Candidate	Votes	%	±%
Conservative	Vincent Ho	30,615	52.26	+13.50
Liberal	Majid Jowhari	26,009	44.40	–3.43
New Democratic	Ebrahim Astaraki	1,054	1.80	–6.95
Green	Alison Lam	495	0.84	N/A
People's	Joshua Sideris	244	0.42	–2.54
Independent	Yan Wang	124	0.21	N/A
Canadian Future	Juni Yeung	43	0.07	N/A
Total valid votes		58,584	99.10	
Total rejected ballots		531	0.90	-0.28
Turnout		59,115	62.98	+8.12
Eligible voters		93,862		
Conservative notional gain from Liberal		Swing		+8.47
Source: Elections Canada

2021 federal election redistributed results
Party	Vote	%
Liberal	23,683	47.83
Conservative	19,190	38.76
New Democratic	4,334	8.75
People's	1,462	2.95
Independent	805	1.63
Libertarian	42	0.08
Total valid votes	49,516	99.25
Rejected ballots	589	1.18
Registered voters/ estimated turnout	91,327	54.86

2021 Canadian federal election: Richmond Hill
Party	Candidate	Votes	%	±%	Expenditures
Liberal	Majid Jowhari	21,784	47.71	+4.23	$100,540.48
Conservative	Costas Menegakis	17,715	38.80	-4.26	$94,783.92
New Democratic	Adam DeVita	3,995	8.75	-0.05	$3,001.25
People's	Igor Tvorogov	1,363	2.98	+1.98	$1,539.41
Independent	Charity DiPaola	619	1.36	–	$31,134.43
Independent	Angelika Keller	186	0.41	–	$0.00
Total valid votes/expense limit		45,662	–	–	$112,849.20
Total rejected ballots		543			
Turnout		46,205	55.57	-4.33	
Eligible voters		83,148			
Liberal hold		Swing		+4.25	
Source: Elections Canada

2019 Canadian federal election: Richmond Hill
Party	Candidate	Votes	%	±%	Expenditures
Liberal	Majid Jowhari	21,804	43.48	-3.42	$83,458.04
Conservative	Costas Menegakis	21,592	43.06	-0.26	$108,773.79
New Democratic	Adam DeVita	4,425	8.80	+0.76	$4,207.04
Green	Ichha Kohli	1,695	3.40	+1.66	$0.00
People's	Igor Tvorogov	507	1.0		none listed
Rhinoceros	Otto Wevers	126	0.2		none listed
Total valid votes/expense limit		50,149	100.0		
Total rejected ballots		584			
Turnout		50,733	59.9		
Eligible voters		84,660			
Liberal hold		Swing		-1.58	
Source: Elections Canada

2015 Canadian federal election: Richmond Hill
Party	Candidate	Votes	%	±%	Expenditures
Liberal	Majid Jowhari	23,032	46.90	+11.28	$92,372.40
Conservative	Michael Parsa	21,275	43.32	-0.23	$139,598.40
New Democratic	Adam DeVita	3,950	8.04	-8.99	$11,776.30
Green	Gwendolyn Veenema	856	1.74	-2.05	–
Total valid votes/Expense limit		49,113	100.0		$215,221.97
Total rejected ballots		253	–	–	
Turnout		49,366	61.39	+5.43	
Eligible voters		80,402			
Liberal gain from Conservative		Swing		+5.76%	
Source: Elections Canada

2011 federal election redistributed results
Party	Vote	%
Conservative	18,521	43.55
Liberal	15,160	35.62
New Democratic	7,245	17.03
Green	1,612	3.79
Others	4	0.01

2011 Canadian federal election
Party	Candidate	Votes	%	±%	Expenditures
Conservative	Costas Menegakis	22,078	44.14	+8.45	
Liberal	Bryon Wilfert	17,671	35.33	-11.66	
New Democratic	Adam DeVita	8,433	16.86	+6.97	
Green	Cameron Hastings	1,832	3.66	-3.75	
Total valid votes/Expense limit		50,014	100.00		
Total rejected ballots		221	0.44	-0.05	
Turnout		50,235	55.96	+3.91	
Eligible voters		89,765	–	–	
Conservative gain from Liberal		Swing		+10.05%	

2008 Canadian federal election
Party	Candidate	Votes	%	±%	Expenditures
Liberal	Bryon Wilfert	21,488	46.99	-6.58	$76,540
Conservative	Chungsen Leung	16,318	35.69	+3.81	$86,007
New Democratic	Wess Dowsett	4,526	9.89	-0.07	$8,114
Green	Dylan Marando	3,388	7.41	+2.84	$6,267
Total valid votes/Expense limit		45,720	100.00	$90,834	
Total rejected ballots		223	0.49	+0.16	
Turnout		45,943	52.05	-9.69	
Liberal hold		Swing		-5.70%	

2006 Canadian federal election
Party	Candidate	Votes	%	±%
Liberal	Bryon Wilfert	27,837	53.57	-4.91
Conservative	Joe Di Paola	16,564	31.88	+7.00
New Democratic	Wess Dowsett	5,176	9.96	+0.26
Green	Tim Rudkins	2,379	4.57	-0.06
Total valid votes		51,956	100.00	
Total rejected ballots		170	0.33	
Turnout		52,126	61.74	
Liberal hold		Swing		-5.95%

2004 Canadian federal election
Party	Candidate	Votes	%
Liberal	Bryon Wilfert	27,102	58.48
Conservative	Pete Merrifield	11,530	24.88
New Democratic	Nella Cotrupi	4,495	9.70
Green	Tim Rudkins	2,144	4.63
Progressive Canadian	Ellena Lam	1,074	2.32
Total valid votes		46,345	100.00

== See also ==
- List of Canadian electoral districts
- Historical federal electoral districts of Canada
