= Vincent Ho (politician) =

Canadian politician (born 1993)

Vincent Ho MP

Member of Parliament for Richmond Hill South
- Incumbent
- Assumed office April 28, 2025
- Preceded by: Majid Jowhari

Personal details
- Born: 1993 (age 32–33) Mississauga, Ontario, Canada
- Party: Conservative
- Education: University of Toronto; Schulich School of Business (MBA); Osgoode Hall Law School (JD, LLM)
- Website: https://richmondhill.conservativeeda.ca/

Vincent Neil Ho MP (Chinese: 何諾軒; pinyin: Hé Nuò Xuān; born 1993) is a Canadian lawyer and politician who has been the member of Parliament (MP) for Richmond Hill South since 2025. A member of the Conservative Party of Canada, Ho practised corporate law prior to entering politics.

== Early life ==
Vincent Neil Ho was born in Mississauga, Ontario and grew up in Richmond Hill, Ontario for most of his life. His parents immigrated to Canada from British Hong Kong in the 1980s. He graduated from Richmond Hill High School and was enrolled in York Region District School Board's gifted program.

== Education and professional qualifications ==
Ho attended the Rotman Commerce program at the University of Toronto where he completed his Bachelor of Commerce, jointly specializing in Finance & Economics, graduating with high distinction in 2014 in just three years. After, he enrolled in York University's JD/MBA combined degree program completing his Juris Doctor at the Osgoode Hall Law School and his Master of Business Administration at the Schulich School of Business, specializing in finance and strategic management. He graduated in 2017, finishing the four-year program in three years. In 2018, Ho was admitted to the New York bar and called to the Ontario bar after passing the bar exams in each jurisdiction. Subsequently, Ho attained his part-time professional LLM degree from Osgoode Hall Law School while working in private practice as a lawyer. He later earned his Chartered Financial Analyst charter in 2022 after passing all three levels of the CFA Institute's exams during that time.

== Legal and professional career ==
After completing law school and his MBA, Ho articled and later became an associate at Loopstra Nixon LLP, a prominent full-service law firm based in Toronto, working as a corporate, M&A and financing lawyer practicing law of both Canada and the United States. In 2024, Ho became one of the youngest named partners in the firm's 50-year history. In 2023, he was recognized as the "Best Lawyers Ones to Watch" for Corporate Law in Toronto, Canada.

== Political career ==
In 2018, Ho was elected to his first term on the provincial party executive (board of directors) of the Progressive Conservative Party of Ontario as 9th Vice-President during which he played an instrumental role in merging the Ontario PC Youth Association (OPCYA) and Ontario PC Campus Association (OPCCA). The Ontario PC Party's two youth wings was merged into a single newly formed youth organization called the Ontario Young PCs in 2019. In 2022, he was re-elected to the position of Secretary and sat on numerous provincial executive committees. Ho sought and won the federal Conservative Party's nomination for the federal electoral district of Richmond Hill on March 18, 2024 to become the candidate in the next general election. Following the 2025 federal election, Ho was elected to the House of Commons as a Member of Parliament (MP) for the Ontario riding of Richmond Hill South.

At the time of the 2025 Canadian federal election, he lived in Richmond Hill, Ontario.

== Roles in Parliament ==
Ho has held various roles in the House of Commons.

=== Committees ===
- SRSR - Standing Committee on Science and Research

=== Parliamentary Associations and Interparliamentary Groups ===
- CADE - Canada-Germany Interparliamentary group
- CAEU - Canada-Europe Parliamentary Association
- CAIL - Canada-Israel Interparliamentary group
- CAJP - Canada-Japan Inter-Parliamentary Group
- CANA - Canadian NATO Parliamentary Association
- CPAM - Canadian Section of ParlAmericas
- SECO - Canadian Delegation to the Organization for Security and Co-operation in Europe Parliamentary Assembly

== Electoral record ==
2025 Canadian federal election: Richmond Hill South
Party	Candidate	Votes	%	±%	Expenditures
Conservative	Vincent Ho	30,615	52.26	+13.50	
Liberal	Majid Jowhari	26,009	44.40	–3.43	
New Democratic	Ebrahim Astaraki	1,054	1.80	–6.95	
Green	Alison Lam	495	0.84	N/A	
People's	Joshua Sideris	244	0.42	–2.53	
Independent	Yan Wang	124	0.21	N/A	
Canadian Future	Juni Yeung	43	0.07	N/A	
Total valid votes/expense limit		58,584	99.10		
Total rejected ballots		531	0.90		
Turnout		59,115	62.98		
Eligible voters		93,862			
Conservative notional gain from Liberal		Swing		+8.47	
Source: Elections Canada
