= Costas Menegakis =

Canadian politician

Costas Menegakis MP
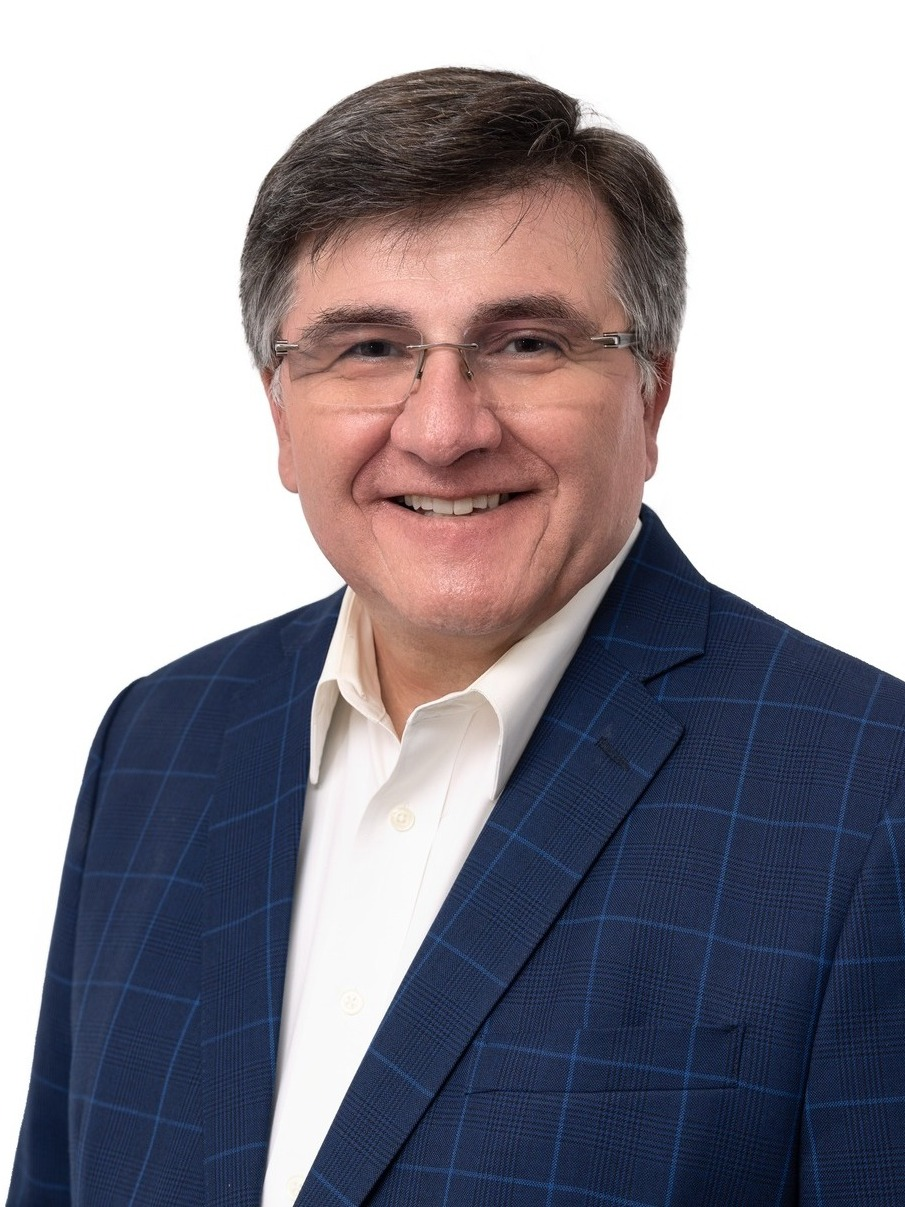
- Menegakis in 2024

Member of Parliament for Aurora—Oak Ridges—Richmond Hill
- Incumbent
- Assumed office April 28, 2025
- Preceded by: Leah Taylor Roy

Member of Parliament for Richmond Hill
- In office May 30, 2011 – August 4, 2015
- Preceded by: Bryon Wilfert
- Succeeded by: Majid Jowhari

Personal details
- Born: Montreal, Quebec, Canada
- Party: Conservative
- Spouse: Gail
- Profession: Politician

Costas Menegakis MP is a Canadian businessman and Canadian politician, who represented the federal electoral district of Richmond Hill from 2011 to 2015. He returned to Parliament in the 2025 Canadian federal election, winning in the district of Aurora—Oak Ridges—Richmond Hill.

== Federal politics ==
=== Member of Parliament ===
Costas Menegakis was re-elected to Canada's 45th Parliament on April 28, 2025, as Member of Parliament for the electoral district of Aurora-Oak Ridges-Richmond Hill. He was first elected to Canada's 41st Parliament on May 2, 2011 as the Member of Parliament for Richmond Hill. In 2013, Menegakis was appointed Parliamentary Secretary to the Minister of Citizenship and Immigration by Prime Minister Stephen Harper. During his time in office, Menegakis has served as a member on the Canadian House of Commons Standing Committees for Citizenship and Immigration, Procedures and House Affairs, Government Operations and Estimates and Official Languages.

=== Justice for Animals in Service Act ===
Costas Menegakis introduced private member’s Bill C-515, that was subsequently adopted as government Bill C-35, An Act to amend the Criminal Code (law enforcement animals, military animals and service animals), during the 41st Parliament of Canada. The bill amended the Criminal Code to create a specific offence for killing or injuring law enforcement animals, military animals, and service animals while they are aiding officers or persons with disabilities in carrying out their duties. It formed part of broader parliamentary efforts to address gaps in legal protections for animals used in public safety and accessibility roles.

The legislation established a maximum penalty of five years’ imprisonment on indictment and required that sentences for offences involving law enforcement animals be served consecutively to any other punishment arising from the same event. Bill C-35 proceeded through second reading and committee study before being reported back to the House of Commons, where it passed third reading with support from multiple parties. The bill was subsequently considered and approved by the Senate without significant amendment, allowing it to advance to Royal Assent.

Bill C-35 received Royal Assent on June 23, 2015, becoming law as the Justice for Animals in Service Act (Quanto’s Law). The legislation was named in reference to Quanto, a police dog Quanto police dog killed in the line of duty in 2013. The bill’s passage represented a relatively uncommon outcome for private members’ legislation in Canada, as only a limited number of such bills complete all stages of the legislative process and receive Royal Assent.

=== 2015 federal election ===
In the 2015 federal election, Menegakis contested in the new Aurora—Oak Ridges—Richmond Hill riding. Menegakis was defeated by Liberal candidate Leona Alleslev by just 1,093 votes.

=== 2019 federal election ===
In February 2018, Menegakis was again elected as the Conservative candidate for Aurora—Oak Ridges—Richmond Hill, but later stepped down as the party's nominee when Alleslev crossed the floor to join the Conservative Party. Two weeks later, Menegakis was acclaimed as the Conservative candidate in his former riding of Richmond Hill, however he lost the riding against the Liberal candidate Majid Jowhari 43.48% to 43.06%.

=== 2021 federal election ===
Menegakis was nominated as the Conservative Candidate in Richmond Hill and was defeated in a rematch of the 2019 federal election by the incumbent MP, Majid Jowhari, 47.7% to 38.8%.

=== 2025 federal election ===
In February 2024, Menegakis announced that he was seeking the Conservative Party nomination in Aurora—Oak Ridges—Richmond Hill for the upcoming federal election. Initially, he was expected to compete against former National Post columnist Sabrina Maddeaux, Aurora town councillor Rachel Gilliland, former Richmond Hill city councillor Carmine Perrelli, and small business owner Yun Liu. However, on May 9, Maddeaux announced that she was suspending her campaign due to concerns that the Party was not taking her allegations of an anonymous email smear campaign against her seriously. The Conservative Party stated that Maddeaux was the only candidate who had access to the Conservative membership list at the time of the alleged smear campaign. Gilliland, whose nomination application was rejected by the Party, raised concerns about the nomination process by stating that she had less support among the existing Conservative membership. Menegakis later defeated Perrelli to become the Conservative nominee.

Menegakis went on to defeat incumbent Liberal MP, Leah Taylor Roy in the 2025 federal election, 54.7% to 42.8%.

== Personal life ==
Menegakis lives with his wife in the Oak Ridges area of Richmond Hill, Ontario. He is a father of two and grandfather of two. He holds a degree in Business from Concordia University’s Faculty of Commerce. Prior to entering politics, Menegakis worked in senior corporate management before founding a marketing company that provided logistics services to national and international clients.

== Electoral record ==
2025 Canadian federal election: Aurora—Oak Ridges—Richmond Hill
| Party | Candidate | Votes | % | ±% | Expenditures |
|---|---|---|---|---|---|
| Conservative | Costas Menegakis | 34,023 | 54.73 | +12.61 | |
| Liberal | Leah Taylor Roy | 26,590 | 42.77 | −1.99 | |
| New Democratic | Danielle Maniuk | 835 | 1.34 | −6.69 | |
| Green | Tom Muench | 465 | 0.75 | +0.57 | |
| People's | Igor Tvorogov | 256 | 0.41 | −3.46 | |
| Total valid votes/expense limit | | 62,169 | 99.34 | +0.44 | |
| Total rejected ballots | | 410 | 0.66 | -0.44 | |
| Turnout | | 62,579 | 70.08 | +15.70 | |
| Eligible voters | | 89,302 | | | |
| Conservative gain from Liberal | | Swing | | +7.30 | |
Source: Elections Canada
Note: number of eligible voters does not include voting day registrations.

2021 Canadian federal election: Richmond Hill
| Party | Candidate | Votes | % | ±% | Expenditures |
|---|---|---|---|---|---|
| Liberal | Majid Jowhari | 21,784 | 47.71 | +4.23 | $100,540.48 |
| Conservative | Costas Menegakis | 17,715 | 38.80 | -4.26 | $94,783.92 |
| New Democratic | Adam DeVita | 3,995 | 8.75 | -0.05 | $3,001.25 |
| People's | Igor Tvorogov | 1,363 | 2.98 | +1.98 | $1,539.41 |
| Independent | Charity DiPaola | 619 | 1.36 | – | $31,134.43 |
| Independent | Angelika Keller | 186 | 0.41 | – | $0.00 |
| Total valid votes/expense limit | | 45,662 | – | – | $112,849.20 |
| Total rejected ballots | | 543 | | | |
| Turnout | | 46,205 | 55.57 | -4.33 | |
| Eligible voters | | 83,148 | | | |
| Liberal hold | | Swing | | +4.25 | |
Source: Elections Canada

2019 Canadian federal election: Richmond Hill
| Party | Candidate | Votes | % | ±% | Expenditures |
|---|---|---|---|---|---|
| Liberal | Majid Jowhari | 21,804 | 43.48 | -3.42 | $83,458.04 |
| Conservative | Costas Menegakis | 21,592 | 43.06 | -0.26 | $108,773.79 |
| New Democratic | Adam DeVita | 4,425 | 8.80 | +0.76 | $4,207.04 |
| Green | Ichha Kohli | 1,695 | 3.40 | +1.66 | $0.00 |
| People's | Igor Tvorogov | 507 | 1.0 | | none listed |
| Rhinoceros | Otto Wevers | 126 | 0.2 | | none listed |
| Total valid votes/expense limit | | 50,149 | 100.0 | | |
| Total rejected ballots | | 584 | | | |
| Turnout | | 50,733 | 59.9 | | |
| Eligible voters | | 84,660 | | | |
| Liberal hold | | Swing | | -1.58 | |
Source: Elections Canada

2015 Canadian federal election: Aurora—Oak Ridges—Richmond Hill
| Party | Candidate | Votes | % | ±% | Expenditures |
|---|---|---|---|---|---|
| Liberal | Leona Alleslev | 24,132 | 47.34 | +19.47 | $76,512.44 |
| Conservative | Costas Menegakis | 23,039 | 45.19 | −6.31 | $150,877.75 |
| New Democratic | Brenda Power | 2,912 | 5.71 | −10.24 | $1,887.13 |
| Green | Randi Ramdeen | 654 | 1.28 | −2.19 | – |
| Animal Alliance | Kyle Bowles | 243 | 0.48 | – | $5,898.62 |
| Total valid votes/expense limit | | 50,980 | 100.00 | | $212,912.36 |
| Total rejected ballots | | 204 | 0.40 | – | |
| Turnout | | 51,184 | 64.91 | – | |
| Eligible voters | | 78,848 | | | |
| Liberal notional gain from Conservative | | Swing | | +12.89 | |
Source: Elections Canada

2011 Canadian federal election
| Party | Candidate | Votes | % | ±% | Expenditures |
|---|---|---|---|---|---|
| Conservative | Costas Menegakis | 22,078 | 44.14 | +8.45 | |
| Liberal | Bryon Wilfert | 17,671 | 35.33 | -11.66 | |
| New Democratic | Adam DeVita | 8,433 | 16.86 | +6.97 | |
| Green | Cameron Hastings | 1,832 | 3.66 | -3.75 | |
| Total valid votes/Expense limit | | 50,014 | 100.00 | | |
| Total rejected ballots | | 221 | 0.44 | -0.05 | |
| Turnout | | 50,235 | 55.96 | +3.91 | |
| Eligible voters | | 89,765 | – | – | |
