= Majid Jowhari =

Canadian politician (born 1960)

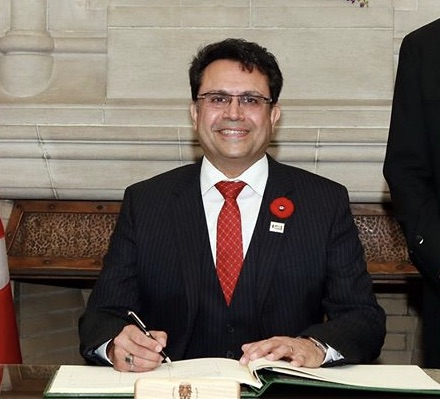

Member of Parliament for Richmond Hill
- In office October 19, 2015 – March 23, 2025
- Preceded by: Costas Menegakis
- Succeeded by: Vincent Ho

Personal details
- Born: October 24, 1960 (age 65) Yusef Abad, Tehran, Iran
- Party: Liberal
- Education: Ryerson University; York University
- Profession: Consultant, former engineer

Majid Jowhari (Persian: مجید جوهری, born October 24, 1960) is a Canadian politician who served as the member of Parliament for the electoral district of Richmond Hill in the House of Commons of Canada from 2015 to 2025. He is a member of the Liberal Party. He was the first federal nominee and candidate of Iranian heritage. Jowhari was the first Iranian-born Canadian member of Parliament of Iranian heritage. Jowhari is one of the first two Iranian-Canadian members of parliament, with the other being Ali Ehsassi.

== Education and designations ==
Jowhari attended Ryerson University, earning a Bachelor of Technology in industrial engineering, and York University's Schulich School of Business, where he earned an MBA. Jowhari was a licensed professional engineer from 1995 to 1999 and founded his own boutique consulting firm.

Prior to entering politics, Majid specialized in large business transition and transformation enabled by technology. He advised fortune 500 companies on strategy and extending value chain business process re-engineering supply chain optimization. This experience has helped bridge to his role as the federal representative, where he helps businesses and organizations in the community flourish and further facilitating community and business forums.

During the 2015 federal election, Jowhari was told that he was not allowed to use the restricted title "Engineer" because did not renew his licence when he changed fields. Jowhari apologized and donated $5,000 to support the Ontario Professional Engineers Foundation for Education, which provides annual scholarships for engineering students who are on the path to licensing.

== 42nd Canadian Parliament ==
Jowhari was elected as the Liberal Party's candidate in Richmond Hill on September 7, 2014, and elected as the member of Parliament for Richmond Hill in 2015 federal election. During the ensuing 42nd Canadian Parliament Jowhari founded and chaired the Parliamentary Mental Health Caucus and held roles on Parliamentary Committees, Parliamentary Associations, and Interparliamentary Groups. On January 29, 2016, Jowhari was appointed to the Industry, Science and Technology Parliamentary Committee and the Government Operations and Estimates Parliamentary Committee in August 2017. Jowhari was a member of the Canada-China Legislative Association, the Canada-Japan Inter-Parliamentary Group, and the Canadian NATO Parliamentary Association.

=== Mental Health Advocacy in Parliament ===
In 2018, the Canadian Alliance on Mental Illness and Mental Health (CAMIMH) named Majid Jowhari as a Parliamentary Mental Health Champion. Jowhari received this award due to the fact that he drafted and introduced legislation to change the criminal code to incorporate Mental Health into the pre-sentencing report. In 2016, Jowhari founded and chaired the Liberal Mental Health Caucus, which he later expanded in 2018 by creating the Parliamentary Mental Health Caucus. As the founder and Chair of Parliamentary Mental Health Caucus, Jowhari worked with Parliamentarians across all parties and Senators to create a collaborative team that will bring mental health to the forefront of discussion on the hill.

=== Advocacy for Diplomacy ===
Consistent with Prime Minister Justin Trudeau's 2015 federal election promise to establish diplomatic relations with Iran, Jowhari accepted the request to sponsor a Parliamentary E-Petition "E-553 (Iran)" initiated by Bijan Ahmadi which specifically asks the Government of Canada to re-establish diplomatic relations and consular services with Iran, including reopening embassies in both countries. The petition provided historical background information and cited how the 2012 closure impacts Iranian-Canadians nationwide. This petition successfully garnered over 15,781 verified signatures. Conservative Member of Parliament Peter Kent sponsored petition "E-563", which directly opposed Jowhari's but only garnered 607 verified signatures.

An Iranian delegation composed of members of Parliament and their Secretary of a Development Committee was in Canada to formally meet with officials at the International Civil Aviation Organization in Montreal. The delegation requested a meeting with Jowhari which took place in his constituency office in Richmond Hill. Jowhari stated over email that the premise of this meeting was an opportunity to listen and discuss as well as express his concerns related to human rights in Iran.

== 43rd Canadian Parliament ==
Jowhari was re-elected 2019 election. He won the tight race with a margin of only 212 votes against Conservative candidate Costas Menegakis. During the 43rd Canadian Parliament he sponsored one private member bill, Bill C-207 An Act to amend the Criminal Code (presentence report) which sought to include aspects of an offender's mental condition, relevant for sentencing purposes, in presentence reports, though the bill was not brought to a vote.

=== Motion M-36 Emancipation Day ===
On March 9, 2020, Majid tabled a private member's motion that would have August 1 of every year be recognized as 'Emancipation Day' across Canada. Jowhari worked with Nova Scotia Senator Wanda Thomas Bernard on gaining support and momentum for the motion. In an interview with The Globe and Mail on Motion M-36, Jowhari exclaimed that "Canada should also apologize for its history of slavery and consider how it can reconcile it through government initiatives or reparations." In a Facebook Note to his constituents, Majid Jowhari wrote,

As we approach August 1, I want to affirm that our responsibility to confront our history and advocate for greater diversity, inclusion and opportunity does not end with Emancipation Day. While the extraordinary circumstances of the Covid-19 pandemic have temporarily changed the course of my Private Member's Motion, Motion 36, being approved in Parliament, I urge you to continue to prioritize this cause. I will continue to be an advocate for a more inclusive and diverse society in which Emancipation Day and its history are represented and embodied in our schools and institutions. My hope is that you will join me in exploring our nation's history and take part in your community's Emancipation Day celebrations safely and remotely.

Jowhari's private member's bill was passed unanimously on March 24, 2021, officially designating August 1 as Emancipation Day in Canada.

== 44th Canadian Parliament ==
Jowhari was again re-elected in the 2021 election. He won the race by a margin of 4,069 votes.

== Electoral record ==
2025 Canadian federal election: Richmond Hill South
Party	Candidate	Votes	%	±%	Expenditures
Conservative	Vincent Ho	30,615	52.26	+13.50	
Liberal	Majid Jowhari	26,009	44.40	–3.43	
New Democratic	Ebrahim Astaraki	1,054	1.80	–6.95	
Green	Alison Lam	495	0.84	N/A	
People's	Joshua Sideris	244	0.42	–2.53	
Independent	Yan Wang	124	0.21	N/A	
Canadian Future	Juni Yeung	43	0.07	N/A	
Total valid votes/expense limit		58,584	99.10		
Total rejected ballots		531	0.90		
Turnout		59,115	62.98		
Eligible voters		93,862			
Conservative notional gain from Liberal		Swing		+8.47	
Source: Elections Canada

2021 Canadian federal election: Richmond Hill
Party	Candidate	Votes	%	±%	Expenditures
Liberal	Majid Jowhari	21,784	47.71	+4.23	$100,540.48
Conservative	Costas Menegakis	17,715	38.80	-4.26	$94,783.92
New Democratic	Adam DeVita	3,995	8.75	-0.05	$3,001.25
People's	Igor Tvorogov	1,363	2.98	+1.98	$1,539.41
Independent	Charity DiPaola	619	1.36	–	$31,134.43
Independent	Angelika Keller	186	0.41	–	$0.00
Total valid votes/expense limit		45,662	–	–	$112,849.20
Total rejected ballots		543			
Turnout		46,205	55.57	-4.33	
Eligible voters		83,148			
Liberal hold		Swing		+4.25	
Source: Elections Canada

2019 Canadian federal election: Richmond Hill
Party	Candidate	Votes	%	±%	Expenditures
Liberal	Majid Jowhari	21,804	43.48	-3.42	$83,458.04
Conservative	Costas Menegakis	21,592	43.06	-0.26	$108,773.79
New Democratic	Adam DeVita	4,425	8.80	+0.76	$4,207.04
Green	Ichha Kohli	1,695	3.40	+1.66	$0.00
People's	Igor Tvorogov	507	1.0		none listed
Rhinoceros	Otto Wevers	126	0.2		none listed
Total valid votes/expense limit		50,149	100.0		
Total rejected ballots		584			
Turnout		50,733	59.9		
Eligible voters		84,660			
Liberal hold		Swing		-1.58	
Source: Elections Canada

2015 Canadian federal election: Richmond Hill
Party	Candidate	Votes	%	±%	Expenditures
Liberal	Majid Jowhari	23,032	46.9	+8.28	–
Conservative	Michael Parsa	21,275	43.3	-0.25	–
New Democratic	Adam DeVita	3,950	8.0	-9.0	–
Green	Gwendolyn Veenema	856	1.7	-1.96	–
Total valid votes/Expense limit		49,113	100.0		$214,687.76
Total rejected ballots		253	–	–	
Turnout		49,366	61.39	+5.43	
Eligible voters		80,402			
Source: Elections Canada
