= Michael Parsa =

Canadian politician

The Honourable Michael Parsa ECO MPP
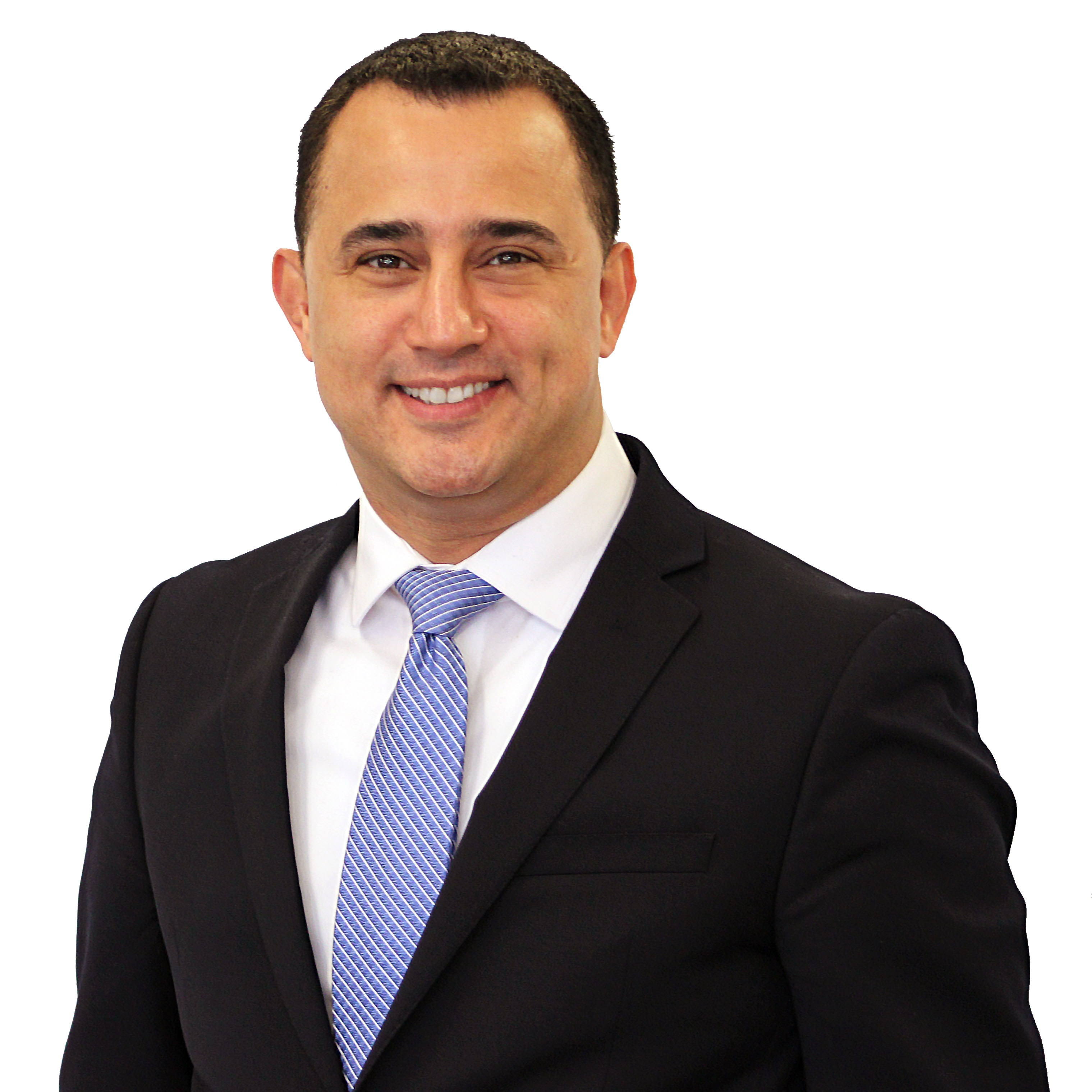
- Parsa in 2022

Minister of Children, Community and Social Services
- Incumbent
- Assumed office March 24, 2023
- Premier: Doug Ford
- Preceded by: Merrilee Fullerton

Associate Minister of Housing
- In office June 24, 2022 – March 24, 2023
- Premier: Doug Ford
- Preceded by: Position Established
- Succeeded by: Nina Tangri

Member of the Ontario Provincial Parliament for Aurora—Oak Ridges—Richmond Hill
- Incumbent
- Assumed office June 7, 2018
- Preceded by: Constitutency established

Personal details
- Party: Progressive Conservative
- Spouse: Valerie
- Occupation: Small business owner
- Website: https://michaelparsampp.ca/

Michael Parsa MPP (Persian: میکائیل پارسا) is a Canadian politician who was elected to the Legislative Assembly of Ontario during the 2018 general election. He represents the riding of Aurora—Oak Ridges—Richmond Hill, and is a member of the Progressive Conservative Party of Ontario. He is currently Ontario's Minister of Children, Community and Social Services.

== Background ==
Parsa has a B.A. in organizational management. Prior to entering politics, he ran a family business which had been operating in the Greater Toronto Area since 1990. He served on the board of the Optimist Club and served as its president from 2005 to 2009.

== Political career ==
=== 2015 federal election ===
Parsa ran in the 2015 Canadian federal election as the Conservative Party of Canada candidate in the Ontario riding of Richmond Hill and finished second to Liberal Majid Jowhari.

=== Provincial parliament roles ===
Parsa was elected to the Legislative Assembly of Ontario during the 2018 Ontario election in the riding of Aurora—Oak Ridges—Richmond Hill. He served as Parliamentary Assistant to the Minister of Economic Development, Job Creation and Trade (Small Business) from June 29, 2018 to June 26, 2019 and has served as Parliamentary Assistant to the President of the Treasury Board from July 26, 2019 to June 24, 2022. Parsa has also been a member of the Standing Committee on Public Accounts since July 26, 2018.

Beginning after the 2022 Ontario general election, Parsa served as the Associate Minister for Municipal Affairs and Housing until succeeding Merrilee Fullerton as Minister of Children, Community and Social Services.

== Personal life ==
Parsa has lived in Aurora—Oak Ridges—Richmond Hill since 2002.

== Election results ==
2025 Ontario general election: Aurora—Oak Ridges—Richmond Hill
Party	Candidate	Votes	%	±%
Progressive Conservative	Michael Parsa	19,670	57.19	+3.93
Liberal	Jason Cherniak	11,645	33.86	+3.14
New Democratic	Naila Saeed	1,929	5.61	–2.07
Green	Ikram Kahn	610	1.77	–2.12
New Blue	Rosaria Wiseman	540	1.57	–0.42
Total valid votes		34,394	99.36	
Total rejected, unmarked and declined ballots		222	0.64	+0.10
Turnout		34,616	38.30	+0.11
Eligible voters		90,385		
Progressive Conservative hold		Swing		+0.39
Source: Elections Ontario

2022 Ontario general election: Aurora—Oak Ridges—Richmond Hill
Party	Candidate	Votes	%	±%
Progressive Conservative	Michael Parsa	17,340	53.26	–2.78
Liberal	Marjan Kasirlou	10,000	30.71	+9.12
New Democratic	Reza Pourzad	2,501	7.68	–10.35
Green	Kevin Zheng	1,268	3.89	+1.24
Ontario Party	Catherine Dellerba	732	2.25	–
New Blue	Rosaria Wiseman	649	1.99	–
Moderate	Igor Strelkov	69	0.21	+0.02
Total valid votes		32,559	99.46	
Total rejected, unmarked and declined ballots		176	0.54	–0.44
Turnout		32,735	38.19	–17.24
Eligible voters		85,709		
Progressive Conservative hold		Swing		▼5.95
Source: Elections Ontario

2018 Ontario general election: Aurora—Oak Ridges—Richmond Hill
Party	Candidate	Votes	%	±%
Progressive Conservative	Michael Parsa	25,214	56.03	+17.9
Liberal	Naheed Yaqubian	9,718	21.60	-24.6
New Democratic	Katrina Sale	8,116	18.04	+7.5
Green	Stephanie Nicole Duncan	1,195	2.66	-0.8
Libertarian	Serge Korovitsyn	313	0.70	-
None of the Above	Santiago Amesh Desilva	218	0.48	-
Moderate	Margarita Barsky	86	0.19	-
Freedom	Janusz Butylkin	71	0.16	-
Social Reform	Abu Alam	67	0.15	-
Total valid votes		44,998	99.02	-
Total rejected, unmarked and declined ballots		446	0.98	
Turnout		45,444	56.84	
Eligible voters		79,950		
Progressive Conservative pickup new district.				
Source: Elections Ontario

2015 Canadian federal election: Richmond Hill
Party	Candidate	Votes	%	±%	Expenditures
Liberal	Majid Jowhari	23,032	46.90	+11.28	$92,372.40
Conservative	Michael Parsa	21,275	43.32	-0.23	$139,598.40
New Democratic	Adam DeVita	3,950	8.04	-8.99	$11,776.30
Green	Gwendolyn Veenema	856	1.74	-2.05	–
Total valid votes/Expense limit		49,113	100.0		$215,221.97
Total rejected ballots		253	–	–	
Turnout		49,366	61.39	+5.43	
Eligible voters		80,402			
Liberal gain from Conservative		Swing		+5.76%	
Source: Elections Canada
