= Aurora—Oak Ridges—Richmond Hill (provincial electoral district) =

Provincial electoral district in Ontario, Canada

Coordinates: 43.940°N 79.454°W

Ontario electoral district
- Aurora—Oak Ridges—Richmond Hill in relation to other Greater Toronto Area districts

Provincial electoral district
- Legislature: Legislative Assembly of Ontario
MPP
Michael Parsa
Progressive Conservative
- District created: 2015
- First contested: 2018
- Last contested: 2025

Demographics
- Population (2021): 118,883
- Electors (2025): 90,295
- Area (km²): 96
- Pop. density (per km²): 1,238.4
- Census division: York Region
- Census subdivision(s): Aurora, Richmond Hill

Aurora—Oak Ridges—Richmond Hill is a provincial electoral district in Ontario, Canada. It elects one member to the Legislative Assembly of Ontario. This riding was created in 2015.

== Members of Provincial Parliament ==
Aurora—Oak Ridges—Richmond Hill
Assembly	Years	Member	Party
Riding created from Newmarket—Aurora, Oak Ridges—Markham, and Richmond Hill
42nd	2018–2022	Michael Parsa	Progressive Conservative
43rd	2022–2025	Michael Parsa	Progressive Conservative
44th	2025–present	Michael Parsa	Progressive Conservative

== Election results ==
Winning party in each polling division of Aurora—Oak Ridges—Richmond Hill at the 2025 Ontario general election

2025 Ontario general election
Party	Candidate	Votes	%	±%
Progressive Conservative	Michael Parsa	19,670	57.19	+3.93
Liberal	Jason Cherniak	11,645	33.86	+3.14
New Democratic	Naila Saeed	1,929	5.61	–2.07
Green	Ikram Kahn	610	1.77	–2.12
New Blue	Rosaria Wiseman	540	1.57	–0.42
Total valid votes		34,394	99.36	
Total rejected, unmarked and declined ballots		222	0.64	+0.10
Turnout		34,616	38.30	+0.11
Eligible voters		90,385		
Progressive Conservative hold		Swing		+0.39
Source: Elections Ontario

Winning party in each polling division of Aurora—Oak Ridges—Richmond Hill at the 2022 Ontario general election

2022 Ontario general election
Party	Candidate	Votes	%	±%
Progressive Conservative	Michael Parsa	17,340	53.26	–2.78
Liberal	Marjan Kasirlou	10,000	30.71	+9.12
New Democratic	Reza Pourzad	2,501	7.68	–10.35
Green	Kevin Zheng	1,268	3.89	+1.24
Ontario Party	Catherine Dellerba	732	2.25	–
New Blue	Rosaria Wiseman	649	1.99	–
Moderate	Igor Strelkov	69	0.21	+0.02
Total valid votes		32,559	99.46	
Total rejected, unmarked and declined ballots		176	0.54	–0.44
Turnout		32,735	38.19	–17.24
Eligible voters		85,709		
Progressive Conservative hold		Swing		▼5.95
Source: Elections Ontario

2018 Ontario general election
Party	Candidate	Votes	%
Progressive Conservative	Michael Parsa	25,214	56.03
Liberal	Naheed Yaqubian	9,718	21.60
New Democratic	Katrina Sale	8,116	18.04
Green	Stephanie Nicole Duncan	1,195	2.66
Libertarian	Serge Korovitsyn	313	0.70
None of the Above	Santiago Amesh Desilva	218	0.48
Moderate	Margarita Barsky	86	0.19
Freedom	Janusz Butylkin	71	0.16
Social Reform	Abu Alam	67	0.15
Total valid votes		44,998	99.02
Total rejected, unmarked and declined ballots		446	0.98
Turnout		45,444	55.43
Eligible voters		81,979	
Progressive Conservative pickup new district.			
Source: Elections Ontario

2014 Ontario election redistributed results
Party	Vote	%
Liberal	15,758	45.7
Progressive Conservative	13,136	38.1
New Democratic	3,629	10.5
Green	1,195	3.5
Others	747	2.2

== See also ==
- List of Ontario provincial electoral districts
- Canadian provincial electoral districts
