= Aurora—Oak Ridges—Richmond Hill (federal electoral district) =

Federal electoral district in Ontario, Canada

Ontario electoral district
- Interactive map of riding boundaries from the 2025 federal election
- Coordinates: 43.940326°N 79.453999°W; Location of the federal constituency office (as of 7 May 2016)

Federal electoral district
- Legislature: House of Commons
MP
Costas Menegakis
Conservative
- District created: 2013
- First contested: 2015
- Last contested: 2025
- District webpage: profile, map

Demographics
- Population (2021): 118,883
- Electors (2015): 78,848
- Area (km²): 94.63
- Pop. density (per km²): 1,256.3
- Census division: York Region
- Census subdivision(s): Richmond Hill (part), Aurora (part)

Aurora—Oak Ridges—Richmond Hill is a federal electoral district in Ontario, Canada. It has been represented by Costas Menegakis, a Conservative, since 2025.

The riding was created by the 2012 federal electoral boundaries redistribution out of parts of Newmarket—Aurora, Oak Ridges—Markham, and Richmond Hill. It was legally defined in the 2013 representation order, and came into effect upon the dropping of the writs for the 2015 federal election. It encompasses a portion of Ontario previously included in the electoral districts of

Following the 2022 Canadian federal electoral redistribution, it gained the Aurora neighbourhoods of Hills of St. Andrew and Aurora Heights from Newmarket—Aurora, and lost all of its territory south of Elgin Mills Road (Rouge Woods area of Richmond Hill) to Richmond Hill South.

== Demographics ==
According to the 2021 Canadian census, 2023 representation order

Racial groups: 45.6% White, 24.1% Chinese, 11.2% West Asian, 7.0% South Asian, 2.3% Korean, 2.1% Black, 1.7% Arab, 1.4% Filipino, 1.1% Latin American Languages: 49.7% English, 11.4% Mandarin, 9.5% Persian, 6.9% Cantonese, 4.1% Russian, 2.5% Italian, 1.7% Korean, 1.4% French, 1.3% Arabic, 1.2% Spanish
Religions: 44.2% Christian (21.9% Catholic, 5.7% Christian Orthodox, 2.4% Anglican, 2.1% United Church, 1.1% Presbyterian, 11.0% Other), 11.5% Muslim, 3.8% Jewish, 2.0% Hindu, 1.7% Buddhist, 35.8% None
Median income: $40,400 (2020)
Average income: $65,600 (2020)

== Members of Parliament ==
This riding has elected the following members of Parliament:

Parliament	Years	Member	Party
Riding created from Newmarket—Aurora, Oak Ridges—Markham, and Richmond Hill
42nd	2015–2018	Leona Alleslev	Liberal
42nd	2018–2019	Leona Alleslev	Conservative
43rd	2019–2021	Leona Alleslev	Conservative
44th	2021–2025	Leah Taylor Roy	Liberal
45th	2025–present	Costas Menegakis	Conservative

== Election results ==
Graph of general election results in Aurora—Oak Ridges—Richmond Hill (minor parties that never got 2% of the vote or didn't run consistently are omitted)

2025 Canadian federal election
Party	Candidate	Votes	%	±%
Conservative	Costas Menegakis	34,023	54.73	+12.60
Liberal	Leah Taylor Roy	26,590	42.77	−1.99
New Democratic	Danielle Maniuk	835	1.34	−6.69
Green	Tom Muench	465	0.75	+0.56
People's	Igor Tvorogov	256	0.41	−3.46
Total valid votes		62,169	99.34	
Total rejected ballots		410	0.66	-0.37
Turnout		62,579	69.52	+12.83
Eligible voters		90,016		
Conservative notional gain from Liberal		Swing		+7.30
Source: Elections Canada

2021 federal election redistributed results
Party	Vote	%
Liberal	21,005	44.76
Conservative	19,766	42.12
New Democratic	3,770	8.03
People's	1,818	3.87
Libertarian	458	0.98
Green	86	0.18
Independent	20	0.04
Total valid votes	46,923	98.97
Rejected ballots	488	1.03
Registered voters/ estimated turnout	83,630	56.69

2021 Canadian federal election
Party	Candidate	Votes	%	±%	Expenditures
Liberal	Leah Taylor Roy	20,764	45.24	+2.86	$102,230.88
Conservative	Leona Alleslev	19,304	42.06	-2.32	$96,732.68
New Democratic	Janice Hagan	3,594	7.83	+0.63	$25.50
People's	Anthony Siskos	1,734	3.78	+2.78	$1,630.40
Libertarian	Serge Korovitsyn	500	1.09	+0.09	$0.00
Total valid votes/expense limit		45,896	98.90	–	$113,842.33
Total rejected ballots		509	1.10		
Turnout		46,405	55.01	-9.39	
Eligible voters		84,361			
Liberal gain from Conservative		Swing		+2.59	
Source: Elections Canada

2019 Canadian federal election
Party	Candidate	Votes	%	±%	Expenditures
Conservative	Leona Alleslev	23,568	44.38	-0.81	$100,442.03
Liberal	Leah Taylor Roy	22,508	42.38	-4.96	$100,105.74
New Democratic	Aaron Brown	3,820	7.20	+1.49	$282.50
Green	Timothy Flemming	2,154	4.0	+2.72	$2,471.02
People's	Priya Patil	530	1.0		$500.00
Libertarian	Serge Korovitsyn	529	1.0		none listed
Total valid votes/expense limit		53,109	100.0		
Total rejected ballots		454			
Turnout		53563	64.4%		
Eligible voters		83156			
Conservative hold		Swing		+2.08	
Source: Elections Canada; CBC News

2015 Canadian federal election
Party	Candidate	Votes	%	±%	Expenditures
Liberal	Leona Alleslev	24,132	47.34	+19.47	$76,512.44
Conservative	Costas Menegakis	23,039	45.19	−6.31	$150,877.75
New Democratic	Brenda Power	2,912	5.71	−10.24	$1,887.13
Green	Randi Ramdeen	654	1.28	−2.19	–
Animal Alliance	Kyle Bowles	243	0.48	–	$5,898.62
Total valid votes/expense limit		50,980	100.00		$212,912.36
Total rejected ballots		204	0.40	–	
Turnout		51,184	64.91	–	
Eligible voters		78,848			
Liberal notional gain from Conservative		Swing		+12.89	
Source: Elections Canada

2011 federal election redistributed results
Party	Vote	%
Conservative	20,221	51.51
Liberal	10,941	27.87
New Democratic	6,263	15.95
Green	1,363	3.47
Others	471	1.20

== See also ==
- List of Canadian electoral districts
- Historical federal electoral districts of Canada
