= Women in the 44th Canadian Parliament =

Canadian women MPs from 2021 to 2025

The 44th Canadian Parliament includes a record number of female Members of Parliament, with 103 women elected to the 338-member House of Commons of Canada (30.5%) in the 2021 election. Of those 103 women, 22 were elected for the first time in the 2021 election. This represents a gain of five seats over the previous record of 98 women elected at the beginning of the 43rd Canadian Parliament, and a gain of three seats from the record high of 100 women during the previous parliamentary session following by-elections.

By contrast, the 117th United States Congress had 119 elected women sitting in the 435-seat United States House of Representatives (27.3%).

The 2021 election represented the highest proportion of women ever on the ballot.

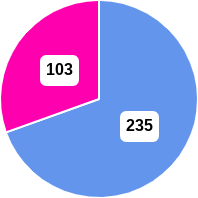
A pie chart showing the gender of members of the Canadian House of Commons.

== Party standings ==
Party	Total women candidates in the 2021 election	% women of total candidates in the 2021 election	Total women elected in the 2021 election	% women elected of total female candidates in the 2021 election	% women elected of total elected in the 2021 election	Total current female members of the House of Commons	% women of current members in the House of Commons
Liberal	147 (of 338)	43%	57 (of 160 (Note: Includes Kevin Vuong, who was on the ballot as a Liberal but was disavowed by the party during the campaign. He sits as an independent.))	38.8%	35.6%	57 (of 338)	16.9%
Conservative	111 (of 337)	33%	22 (of 119)	19.8%	18.5%	22 (of 338)	6.5%
Bloc Québécois	37 (of 78)	47%	12 (of 32)	32.4%	37.5%	12 (of 338)	3.6%
New Democrats	175 (of 338)	52%	11 (of 25)	6.3%	44.0%	12 (of 338)	3.6%
Green	112 (of 252)	44%	1 (of 2)	0.9%	50.0%	1 (of 338)	0.3%
Total			103 (of 338)		30.5%	104 (of 338)	30.8%
Table source:						Table source: and List of House members of the 44th Parliament of Canada	

== Female members ==
- † denotes women who were newly elected in the 2021 election and are serving their first term in office.
- †† denotes women who were newly elected in by-elections following the 2021 election.

Name	Party	Electoral district	Notes
Hon. Anita Anand	Liberal	Oakville	Minister of Transport; former Minister of National Defence
Niki Ashton	New Democratic	Churchill—Keewatinook Aski	
Jenica Atwin	Liberal	Fredericton	
Lisa Marie Barron†	New Democratic	Nanaimo—Ladysmith	
Hon. Rachel Bendayan	Liberal	Outremont	Minister of Official Languages
Hon. Carolyn Bennett	Liberal	Toronto—St. Paul's	Resigned on January 16, 2024; Minister of Mental Health and Addictions and Associate Minister of Health
Hon. Candice Bergen	Conservative	Portage—Lisgar	Resigned on February 28, 2023
Sylvie Bérubé	Bloc Québécois	Abitibi—Baie-James—Nunavik—Eeyou	
Hon. Marie-Claude Bibeau	Liberal	Compton—Stanstead	Former Minister of Agriculture and Agri-Food/National Revenue
Rachel Blaney	New Democratic	North Island—Powell River	Whip of the New Democratic Party
Kelly Block	Conservative	Carlton Trail—Eagle Creek	
Valerie Bradford†	Liberal	Kitchener South—Hespeler	
Hon. Élisabeth Brière	Liberal	Sherbrooke	Minister of National Revenue
Louise Chabot	Bloc Québécois	Thérèse-De Blainville	
Hon. Bardish Chagger	Liberal	Waterloo	Former Minister of Diversity, Inclusion and Youth
Sophie Chatel†	Liberal	Pontiac	
Laurel Collins	New Democratic	Victoria	
Julie Dabrusin	Liberal	Toronto—Danforth	
Pam Damoff	Liberal	Oakville North—Burlington	
Leila Dance††	New Democratic	Elmwood—Transcona	
Raquel Dancho	Conservative	Kildonan—St. Paul	
Claude DeBellefeuille	Bloc Québécois	Salaberry—Suroît	Whip of the Bloc Québécois
Caroline Desbiens	Bloc Québécois	Beauport—Côte-de-Beaupré—Île d'Orléans—Charlevoix	
Anju Dhillon	Liberal	Dorval—Lachine—LaSalle	
Lena Diab†	Liberal	Halifax West	
Hon. Kirsty Duncan	Liberal	Etobicoke North	
Julie Dzerowicz	Liberal	Davenport	
Rosemarie Falk	Conservative	Battlefords—Lloydminster	
Michelle Ferreri†	Conservative	Peterborough—Kawartha	
Hon. Kerry-Lynne Findlay	Conservative	South Surrey—White Rock	
Hon. Mona Fortier	Liberal	Ottawa—Vanier	Former President of the Treasury Board
Hon. Chrystia Freeland	Liberal	University—Rosedale	Former Deputy Prime Minister and Minister of Finance
Hon. Hedy Fry	Liberal	Vancouver Centre	Longest currently-serving female Member of Parliament
Anna Gainey††	Liberal	Notre-Dame-de-Grâce—Westmount	
Cheryl Gallant	Conservative	Renfrew—Nipissing—Pembroke	
Marie-Hélène Gaudreau	Bloc Québécois	Laurentides—Labelle	Chair of the Bloc Québécois caucus
Leah Gazan	New Democratic	Winnipeg Centre	
Marilène Gill	Bloc Québécois	Manicouagan	
Marilyn Gladu	Conservative	Sarnia—Lambton	
Laila Goodridge†	Conservative	Fort McMurray—Cold Lake	
Hon. Karina Gould	Liberal	Burlington	Leader of the Government in the House; former Minister of Families, Children and Social Development
Tracy Gray	Conservative	Kelowna—Lake Country	
Hon. Patty Hajdu	Liberal	Thunder Bay—Superior North	Minister of Indigenous Services and minister responsible for the Federal Economic Development Agency for Northern Ontario
Rachael Harder	Conservative	Lethbridge	
Lisa Hepfner†	Liberal	Hamilton Mountain	
Carol Hughes	New Democratic	Algoma—Manitoulin—Kapuskasing	Assistant Deputy Speaker of the House of Commons
Hon. Gudie Hutchings	Liberal	Long Range Mountains	Minister of Rural Economic Development
Lori Idlout†	New Democratic	Nunavut	
Hon. Marci Ien	Liberal	Toronto Centre	Minister for Women and Gender Equality and Youth
Hon. Helena Jaczek	Liberal	Markham—Stouffville	Former minister responsible for the Federal Economic Development Agency for Southern Ontario
Tamara Jansen††	Conservative	Cloverdale—Langley City	
Hon. Mélanie Joly	Liberal	Ahuntsic-Cartierville	Minister of Foreign Affairs
Yvonne Jones	Liberal	Labrador	
Arielle Kayabaga†	Liberal	London West	
Iqra Khalid	Liberal	Mississauga—Erin Mills	
Hon. Kamal Khera	Liberal	Brampton West	Minister of Diversity, Inclusion and Persons with Disabilities; former Minister of Seniors
Shelby Kramp-Neuman†	Conservative	Hastings—Lennox and Addington	
Annie Koutrakis	Liberal	Vimy	
Stephanie Kusie	Conservative	Calgary Midnapore	
Jenny Kwan	New Democratic	Vancouver East	Chair of the NDP caucus
Marie-France Lalonde	Liberal	Orléans	
Emmanuella Lambropoulos	Liberal	Saint-Laurent	
Melissa Lantsman†	Conservative	Thornhill	
Viviane Lapointe†	Liberal	Sudbury	
Andréanne Larouche	Bloc Québécois	Shefford	
Patricia Lattanzio	Liberal	Saint-Léonard—Saint-Michel	
Hon. Diane Lebouthillier	Liberal	Gaspésie—Les Îles-de-la-Madeleine	Former Minister of National Revenue
Leslyn Lewis†	Conservative	Haldimand—Norfolk	
Hon. Soraya Martinez Ferrada	Liberal	Hochelaga	Minister of Tourism and responsible for the Economic Development Agency of Canada for the Regions of Quebec
Lindsay Mathyssen	New Democratic	London—Fanshawe	
Elizabeth May	Green	Saanich—Gulf Islands	
Heather McPherson	New Democratic	Edmonton—Strathcona	
Alexandra Mendès	Liberal	Brossard—Saint-Lambert	Assistant Deputy Speaker of the House of Commons
Kristina Michaud	Bloc Québécois	Avignon—La Mitis—Matane—Matapédia	
Hon. Joyce Murray	Liberal	Vancouver Quadra	Former Minister of Fisheries, Oceans and the Canadian Coast Guard
Hon. Mary Ng	Liberal	Markham—Thornhill	Minister of Export Promotion, International Trade and Economic Development
Christine Normandin	Bloc Québécois	Saint-Jean	
Jennifer O'Connell	Liberal	Pickering—Uxbridge	
Monique Pauzé	Bloc Québécois	Repentigny	
Hon. Ginette Petitpas Taylor	Liberal	Moncton—Riverview—Dieppe	President of the Treasury Board, former Minister of Official Languages and minister responsible for the Atlantic Canada Opportunities Agency
Hon. Carla Qualtrough	Liberal	Delta	Former Minister of Employment, Workforce Development and Disability Inclusion/Sport and Physical Activity
Hon. Michelle Rempel Garner	Conservative	Calgary Nose Hill	
Anna Roberts†	Conservative	King—Vaughan	
Sherry Romanado	Liberal	Longueuil—Charles-LeMoyne	Deputy Leader of the Government in the House of Commons
Lianne Rood	Conservative	Lambton—Kent—Middlesex	
Hon. Ruby Sahota	Liberal	Brampton North	Minister of Democratic Institutions and minister responsible for the Federal Economic Development Agency for Southern Ontario; former Chief Government Whip
Ya'ara Saks	Liberal	York Centre	
Hon. Judy Sgro	Liberal	Humber River—Black Creek	
Brenda Shanahan	Liberal	Châteauguay—Lacolle	Chair of the Liberal caucus
Sonia Sidhu	Liberal	Brampton South	
Nathalie Sinclair-Desgagné†	Bloc Québécois	Terrebonne	
Hon. Pascale St-Onge†	Liberal	Brome—Missisquoi	Minister of Canadian Heritage; former Minister of Sport and minister responsible for the Economic Development Agency of Canada for the Regions of Quebec
Shannon Stubbs	Conservative	Lakeland	
Jenna Sudds†	Liberal	Kanata—Carleton	
Hon. Filomena Tassi	Liberal	Hamilton West—Ancaster—Dundas	Former Minister of Public Services and Procurement/minister for Canada Post Corp./Receiver General/minister responsible for the Federal Economic Development Agency for Southern Ontario
Leah Taylor Roy†	Liberal	Aurora—Oak Ridges—Richmond Hill	
Hon. Joanne Thompson†	Liberal	St. John's East	Minister of Seniors
Hon. Rechie Valdez†	Liberal	Mississauga—Streetsville	Minister of Small Business
Anita Vandenbeld	Liberal	Ottawa West—Nepean	
Karen Vecchio	Conservative	Elgin—Middlesex—London	
Dominique Vien†	Conservative	Bellechasse—Les Etchemins—Lévis	
Julie Vignola	Bloc Québécois	Beauport—Limoilou	
Cathay Wagantall	Conservative	Yorkton—Melville	
Jean Yip	Liberal	Scarborough—Agincourt	
Salma Zahid	Liberal	Scarborough Centre	
Bonita Zarrillo†	New Democratic	Port Moody—Coquitlam	

== Accessibility to office and equal representation ==
The Canadian Parliament has seen a dramatic increase in the number of women and racialized people that sit in the House of Commons in the last decade. However, the representation of women in the House has not always been key to the government's success. In 1921, the first federal election where the majority of women could vote took place. This was also the year that the very first woman was elected to sit in the House. Although four women ran, only one was elected: Agnes Campbell Macphail.

The 2021 Canadian election once again set a record for the proportion of women candidates; 582 women or gender diverse candidates ran in that year's election, accounting for 43% of all nominees across the five major parties.

One of the largest reasons why there is not a higher percentage of female candidates is because of the barriers to entry that they face. According to the Library of the Canadian Parliament, there are seven key factors that contribute to the barriers to entry that women face: gender stereotypes and discrimination, lack of confidence in their abilities, insufficient efforts to recruit female candidates, difficulties in financing their campaigns, absence of family-friendly and gender-sensitive workplaces, gender-based violence and harassment, and gender-biased media treatment. These seven reasons, identified by the Government of Canada, are the issues that must be addressed if equality is to be achieved in representation. Newman et al. noted similar barriers to entry for women into the political landscape in Canada.

== Female representation in Canada compared to international and provincial representation ==
The number of women in the Canadian Parliament has been slowly but steadily increasing since the 1980s and has reached its highest point following the 2021 Canadian federal election where women made up 30.5% of the Canadian House of Commons, higher than the global average of 25.7% and surpassing the 1995 United Nations goal of 30% female representation in government. In terms of gender representation in government, Canada outperforms a country like the United States in which the House of Representatives is made up of 27.4% women. However, in a country where women make up a slim majority of the population at 50.4% as of 2010, the 43rd Canadian Parliament still falls short when it comes to achieving gender parity in government. Canada also currently ranks 53rd in the world in gender representation in government which is behind the United Kingdom, Sweden, and Rwanda. However, with prominent Canadian political parties like the Liberal Party pledging to include more female representation in government as well as parties like the New Democratic Party putting forward a slate made up of 52% women or gender diverse candidates in the 2021 election, there is significant political pressure to increase the number of women representatives in government.

Canadian provinces and territories come much closer to achieving gender parity in their Legislative Assemblies than their federal counterparts. Similar to the rest of Canada in the province of Ontario women make up a little over half of the population at 50.7% but unlike the rest of Canada 35.5% of Ontario Members of the Legislative Assembly are women. In Quebec, a province where women make up 50.4% of the population, gender parity is even closer to being achieved with women making up 42.4% of the National Assembly. The Northwest Territory has come the closest to achieving gender parity with women making up 48.3% of the population and 47.3% of the Legislative Assembly. Caroline Cochrane served as Northwest Territory premiere until December 8, 2023. Alberta is currently the only province or territory in Canada that has a female Premier, Danielle Smith.

== See also ==
- Women in the 41st Canadian Parliament
- Women in the 42nd Canadian Parliament
- Women in the 43rd Canadian Parliament
