= Women in the 45th Canadian Parliament =

Canadian women MPs from 2025 onwards

The 45th Canadian Parliament has a record number of women Members of Parliament, with 106 women elected to the 343-member House of Commons of Canada (31.0%), 104 of them in the 2025 election, followed by two more in subsequent 2026 by-elections. Due to six more seats the number of women as a percentage is slightly down. Of those 106 women, 38 were elected for the first time in the 2025 election. This represents a gain of three seats over the previous record of 103 women elected at the beginning of the 44th Canadian Parliament.

== Party standings ==
Party	Total women candidates in the 2025 election	% women of total candidates in the 2025 election	Total women elected in the 2025 election	% women elected of total female candidates in the 2025 election	% women elected of total elected in the 2025 election	Total current female members of the House of Commons	% women of current members in the House of Commons
Liberal	122 (of 342)	35.7%	68 (of 170)	55.7%	40.0%	70 (of 343)	20.4%
Conservative	78 (of 342)	22.8%	26 (of 143)	33.3%	18.8%	24 (of 343)	7.0%
Bloc Québécois	32 (of 78)	41.0%	5 (of 22)	15.6%	22.7%	5 (of 343)	1.5%
New Democrats	176 (of 342)	51.5%	4 (of 7)	2.3%	57.1%	3 (of 343)	0.9%
Green	87 (of 232)	37.5%	1 (of 1)	1.2%	100%	1 (of 343)	0.3%
Total			103 (of 343)		30.3%	103 (of 343)	30.3%
Table source:						Table source: and List of House members of the 45th Parliament of Canada	

== Female members ==
- † denotes women who were newly elected in the 2025 election and are serving their first term in office.
- †† denotes women who were not members of the 44th parliament, but previously served in another parliament.
- ††† denotes women who were newly elected in by-elections following the 2025 election.

Name	Party	Electoral district	Notes
Sima Acan†	Liberal	Oakville West	
Hon. Rebecca Alty†	Liberal	Northwest Territories	Minister of Crown–Indigenous Relations and Northern Affairs, former mayor of Yellowknife, Northwest Territories
Hon. Anita Anand	Liberal	Oakville East	Minister of Foreign Affairs
Carol Anstey†	Conservative	Long Range Mountains	
Tatiana Auguste†	Liberal	Terrebonne	Seat vacant on February 13, 2026; re-elected on April 13
Doly Begum†††	Liberal	Scarborough Southwest	Former New Democratic member of the Legislative Assembly of Ontario
Hon. Rachel Bendayan	Liberal	Outremont	
Kelly Block	Conservative	Carlton Trail—Eagle Creek	
Kathy Borrelli†	Conservative	Windsor—Tecumseh—Lakeshore	
Hon. Élisabeth Brière	Liberal	Sherbrooke	Former Minister of National Revenue
Hon. Bardish Chagger	Liberal	Waterloo	Former Minister of Diversity, Inclusion and Youth
Hon. Rebecca Chartrand†	Liberal	Churchill—Keewatinook Aski	Minister of Northern and Arctic Affairs and minister responsible for the Canadian Northern Economic Development Agency
Sophie Chatel	Liberal	Pontiac—Kitigan Zibi	
Madeleine Chenette†	Liberal	Thérèse-De Blainville	
Maggie Chi†	Liberal	Don Valley North	
Leslie Church†	Liberal	Toronto—St. Paul's	
Sandra Cobeña†	Conservative	Newmarket—Aurora	
Connie Cody†	Conservative	Cambridge	
Hon. Julie Dabrusin	Liberal	Toronto—Danforth	Minister of Environment and Climate Change
Raquel Dancho	Conservative	Kildonan—St. Paul	
Marianne Dandurand†	Liberal	Compton—Stanstead	
Claude DeBellefeuille	Bloc Québécois	Beauharnois—Salaberry—Soulanges—Huntingdon	Whip of the Bloc Québécois
Kelly DeRidder†	Conservative	Kitchener Centre	
Caroline Desrochers†	Liberal	Trois-Rivières	
Anju Dhillon	Liberal	Dorval—Lachine—LaSalle	
Hon. Lena Diab	Liberal	Halifax West	Minister of Immigration, Refugees and Citizenship
Julie Dzerowicz	Liberal	Davenport	
Rosemarie Falk	Conservative	Battlefords—Lloydminster—Meadow Lake	
Jessica Fancy-Landry†	Liberal	South Shore—St. Margarets	
Hon. Mona Fortier	Liberal	Ottawa—Vanier—Gloucester	Former President of the Treasury Board
Hon. Chrystia Freeland	Liberal	University—Rosedale	Former Minister of Transport and Internal Trade; resigned on January 9, 2026
Hon. Hedy Fry	Liberal	Vancouver Centre	Longest currently-serving female Member of Parliament
Hon. Anna Gainey	Liberal	Notre-Dame-de-Grâce—Westmount	Secretary of State (Children and Youth)
Cheryl Gallant	Conservative	Algonquin—Renfrew—Pembroke	
Marie-Hélène Gaudreau	Bloc Québécois	Laurentides—Labelle	Chair of the Bloc Québécois caucus
Leah Gazan	New Democratic	Winnipeg Centre	
Marilène Gill	Bloc Québécois	Côte-Nord—Kawawachikamach—Nitassinan	
Marilyn Gladu	Liberal	Sarnia—Lambton—Bkejwanong	Elected as a Conservative, crossed the floor on April 8, 2026
Laila Goodridge	Conservative	Fort McMurray—Cold Lake	
Hon. Karina Gould	Liberal	Burlington	Former Leader of the Government in the House; former Minister of Families, Children and Social Development
Mandy Gull-Masty†	Liberal	Abitibi—Baie-James—Nunavik—Eeyou	Minister of Indigenous Services
Hon. Patty Hajdu	Liberal	Thunder Bay—Superior North	Minister of Jobs and Families and minister responsible for the Federal Economic Development Agency for Northern Ontario
Emma Harrison†	Liberal	Peterborough	
Lisa Hepfner	Liberal	Hamilton Mountain	
Alana Hirtle†	Liberal	Cumberland—Colchester	
Lori Idlout	Liberal	Nunavut	Elected as a New Democrat, crossed the floor on March 10, 2026
Hon. Helena Jaczek	Liberal	Markham—Stouffville	Former minister responsible for the Federal Economic Development Agency for Southern Ontario
Tamara Jansen	Conservative	Cloverdale—Langley City	
Hon. Mélanie Joly	Liberal	Ahuntsic-Cartierville	Minister of Industry and minister responsible for Canada Economic Development for Quebec Regions
Hon. Arielle Kayabaga	Liberal	London West	Former Leader of the Government in the House
Iqra Khalid	Liberal	Mississauga—Erin Mills	
Rhonda Kirkland†	Conservative	Oshawa	
Helena Konanz†	Conservative	Similkameen—South Okanagan—West Kootenay	
Annie Koutrakis	Liberal	Vimy	
Shelby Kramp-Neuman	Conservative	Hastings—Lennox and Addington	
Tamara Kronis†	Conservative	Nanaimo—Ladysmith	
Stephanie Kusie	Conservative	Calgary Midnapore	
Jenny Kwan	New Democratic	Vancouver East	Chair of the NDP caucus
Marie-France Lalonde	Liberal	Orléans	
Emmanuella Lambropoulos	Liberal	Saint-Laurent	
Melissa Lantsman	Conservative	Thornhill	Deputy Leader of the Conservative Party
Linda Lapointe††	Liberal	Rivière-des-Mille-Îles	
Viviane Lapointe	Liberal	Sudbury	
Andréanne Larouche	Bloc Québécois	Shefford	
Patricia Lattanzio	Liberal	Saint-Léonard—Saint-Michel	
Ginette Lavack†	Liberal	St. Boniface—St. Vital	
Leslyn Lewis	Conservative	Haldimand—Norfolk	
Danielle Martin†††	Liberal	University—Rosedale	
Elizabeth May	Green	Saanich—Gulf Islands	
Jennifer McKelvie†	Liberal	Ajax	Former Toronto City Councillor
Hon. Jill McKnight†	Liberal	Delta	Minister of Veterans Affairs and Associate Minister of National Defence
Hon. Stephanie McLean†	Liberal	Esquimalt—Saanich—Sooke	Secretary of State (Seniors), former Alberta cabinet minister and member of the Alberta Legislative Assembly
Heather McPherson	New Democratic	Edmonton—Strathcona	
Marie-Gabrielle Ménard†	Liberal	Hochelaga—Rosemont-Est	
Alexandra Mendès	Liberal	Brossard—Saint-Lambert	
Hon. Marjorie Michel†	Liberal	Papineau	Minister of Health
Shannon Miedema†	Liberal	Halifax	
Giovanna Mingarelli†	Liberal	Prescott—Russell—Cumberland	
Juanita Nathan†	Liberal	Pickering—Brooklin	Former Markham City Councillor
Chi Nguyen†	Liberal	Spadina—Harbourfront	
Christine Normandin	Bloc Québécois	Saint-Jean	
Dominique O'Rourke†	Liberal	Guelph	Former Guelph City Councillor
Hon. Eleanor Olszewski†	Liberal	Edmonton Centre	Minister of Emergency Management and Community Resilience and minister responsible for Prairies Economic Development Canada
Hon. Ginette Petitpas Taylor	Liberal	Moncton—Dieppe	Former President of the Treasury Board
Hon. Nathalie Provost†	Liberal	Châteauguay—Les Jardins-de-Napierville	Secretary of State (Nature)
Hon. Michelle Rempel Garner	Conservative	Calgary Nose Hill	
Anna Roberts	Conservative	King—Vaughan	
Pauline Rochefort†	Liberal	Nipissing—Timiskaming	
Sherry Romanado	Liberal	Longueuil—Charles-LeMoyne	Deputy Leader of the Government in the House of Commons
Lianne Rood	Conservative	Middlesex—London	
Zoë Royer†	Liberal	Port Moody—Coquitlam	
Hon. Ruby Sahota	Liberal	Brampton North—Caledon	Secretary of State (Combatting Crime)
Hon. Judy Sgro	Liberal	Humber River—Black Creek	
Sonia Sidhu	Liberal	Brampton South	
Amandeep Sodhi†	Liberal	Brampton Centre	
Shannon Stubbs	Conservative	Lakeland	
Jenna Sudds	Liberal	Kanata—Carleton	
Kristina Tesser Derksen†	Liberal	Milton East—Halton Hills South	
Rachael Thomas	Conservative	Lethbridge	
Hon. Joanne Thompson	Liberal	St. John's East	Minister of Fisheries
Hon. Rechie Valdez	Liberal	Mississauga—Streetsville	Minister of Women and Gender Equality and Secretary of State (Small Business and Tourism)
Anita Vandenbeld	Liberal	Ottawa West—Nepean	
Dominique Vien	Conservative	Bellechasse—Les Etchemins—Lévis	
Cathay Wagantall	Conservative	Yorkton—Melville	Resigned on August 31, 2026
Jean Yip	Liberal	Scarborough—Agincourt	
Salma Zahid	Liberal	Scarborough Centre—Don Valley East	

== See also ==
- Women in the 41st Canadian Parliament
- Women in the 42nd Canadian Parliament
- Women in the 43rd Canadian Parliament
- Women in the 44th Canadian Parliament
