= Women in the 43rd Canadian Parliament =

The 43rd Canadian Parliament once again set a record number of female Members of Parliament, with 98 women elected to the 338-member House of Commons of Canada (28.9%) in the 2019 election. Of those 98 women, 31 were elected for the first time in the 2019 election. 2 more women were elected in by-elections in October 2020, reaching the historic milestone of 100 women in the House of Commons for the first time. This represents a gain of twelve seats over the previous record of 88 women in the 42nd Canadian Parliament. By contrast, the 116th United States Congress had 102 women sitting in the 435-seat United States House of Representatives (23.4%).

== Party standings ==
Party	Total women candidates in the 2019 Election	% women of total candidates in the 2019 Election	Total women elected in the 2019 Election	% women elected of total women candidates in the 2019 Election	% women elected of total elected in the 2019 Election	Total women members of the House of Commons at dissolution	% women of members in the House of Commons at dissolution
Liberal	133 (of 338)	39.3%	52 (of 157)	39.1%	33.1%	54 (of 337)	16.0%
Conservative	106 (of 338)	31.4%	22 (of 121)	20.8%	18.2%	21 (of 337)	6.2%
Bloc Québécois	36 (of 78)	46.2%	12 (of 32)	33.3%	37.5%	12 (of 337)	3.6%
New Democrats	166 (of 338)	49.1%	9 (of 24)	5.4%	37.5%	9 (of 337)	2.7%
Green	156 (of 336)	46.4%	2 (of 3)	1.3%	66.6%	1 (of 337)	0.3%
Independents						2 (of 337)	0.6%
Total			98 (of 338)		29.0%	99 (of 337)	29.4%
Table source:						Table source: and List of House members of the 43rd Parliament of Canada

== Female Members ==
- † denotes women who were newly elected in the 2019 election and are serving their first term in office.
- †† denotes women who were not members of the 42nd parliament, but previously served in another parliament.
- ††† denotes women who were newly elected in by-elections following the 2019 election.

Name	Party	Electoral district	Notes
Leona Alleslev	Conservative	Aurora—Oak Ridges—Richmond Hill
Hon. Anita Anand†	Liberal	Oakville	Minister of Public Services and Procurement
Niki Ashton	New Democrat	Churchill—Keewatinook Aski
Jenica Atwin†	Liberal	Fredericton	Elected as a Green MP. Crossed the floor to the Liberal Party on June 10, 2021.
Rachel Bendayan	Liberal	Outremont
Hon. Carolyn Bennett	Liberal	Toronto—St. Paul's	Minister of Crown–Indigenous Relations
Hon. Candice Bergen	Conservative	Portage—Lisgar
Sylvie Bérubé†	Bloc Québécois	Abitibi—Baie-James—Nunavik—Eeyou
Lyne Bessette†	Liberal	Brome—Mississquoi
Hon. Marie-Claude Bibeau	Liberal	Compton—Stanstead	Minister of Agriculture and Agri-Food
Rachel Blaney	New Democrat	North Island—Powell River
Kelly Block	Conservative	Carlton Trail—Eagle Creek
Élisabeth Brière†	Liberal	Sherbrooke
Louise Chabot†	Bloc Québécois	Thérèse-De Blainville
Hon. Bardish Chagger	Liberal	Waterloo	Minister of Diversity, Inclusion and Youth
Louise Charbonneau†	Bloc Québécois	Trois-Rivières
Laurel Collins†	New Democrat	Victoria
Julie Dabrusin	Liberal	Toronto—Danforth
Pam Damoff	Liberal	Oakville North—Burlington
Raquel Dancho†	Conservative	Kildonan—St. Paul
Claude DeBellefeuille††	Bloc Québécois	Salaberry—Suroît
Caroline Desbiens†	Bloc Québécois	Beauport—Côte-de-Beaupré—Île d'Orléans—Charlevoix
Anju Dhillon	Liberal	Dorval—Lachine—LaSalle
Hon. Kirsty Duncan	Liberal	Etobicoke North	Deputy Leader of the Government in the House of Commons.
Julie Dzerowicz	Liberal	Davenport
Rosemarie Falk	Conservative	Battlefords—Lloydminster
Hon. Kerry-Lynne Findlay††	Conservative	South Surrey—White Rock
Hon. Diane Finley	Conservative	Haldimand—Norfolk	Resigned on May 11, 2021.
Hon. Mona Fortier	Liberal	Ottawa—Vanier	Minister of Middle Class Prosperity and Associate Minister of Finance
Hon. Chrystia Freeland	Liberal	University—Rosedale	Deputy Prime Minister and Minister of Finance
Hon. Hedy Fry	Liberal	Vancouver Centre	Longest Currently Serving Female Member of Parliament
Cheryl Gallant	Conservative	Renfrew—Nipissing—Pembroke
Marie-Hélène Gaudreau†	Bloc Québécois	Laurentides—Labelle
Leah Gazan†	New Democrat	Winnipeg Centre
Marilène Gill	Bloc Québécois	Manicouagan
Marilyn Gladu	Conservative	Sarnia—Lambton
Hon. Karina Gould	Liberal	Burlington	Minister of International Development
Tracy Gray†	Conservative	Kelowna—Lake Country
Hon. Patty Hajdu	Liberal	Thunder Bay—Superior North	Minister of Health
Rachael Harder	Conservative	Lethbridge
Carol Hughes	New Democrat	Algoma—Manitoulin—Kapuskasing	Assistant Deputy Speaker of the House of Commons
Gudie Hutchings	Liberal	Long Range Mountains
Marci Ien†††	Liberal	Toronto Centre
Helena Jaczek†	Liberal	Markham—Stouffville
Tamara Jansen†	Conservative	Cloverdale—Langley City
Hon. Mélanie Joly	Liberal	Ahuntsic—Cartierville	Minister of Economic Development and Official Languages
Yvonne Jones	Liberal	Labrador
Hon. Bernadette Jordan	Liberal	South Shore—St. Margaret's	Ministers of Fisheries, Oceans and the Canadian Coast Guard
Iqra Khalid	Liberal	Mississauga—Erin Mills
Kamal Khera	Liberal	Brampton West
Annie Koutrakis†	Liberal	Vimy
Stephanie Kusie	Conservative	Calgary Midnapore
Jenny Kwan	New Democrat	Vancouver East
Marie-France Lalonde†	Liberal	Orléans
Emmanuella Lambropoulos	Liberal	Saint-Laurent
Andréanne Larouche†	Bloc Québécois	Shefford
Patricia Lattanzio†	Liberal	Saint-Léonard—Saint-Michel
Hon. Diane Lebouthillier	Liberal	Gaspésie—Les Îles-de-la-Madeleine	Minister of National Revenue
Soraya Martinez Ferrada†	Liberal	Hochelaga
Lindsay Mathyssen†	New Democrat	London—Fanshawe
Elizabeth May	Green	Saanich—Gulf Islands	Leader of the Green Party until November 4, 2019.
Karen McCrimmon	Liberal	Kanata—Carleton
Hon. Catherine McKenna	Liberal	Ottawa Centre	Minister of Infrastructure and Communities
Cathy McLeod	Conservative	Kamloops—Thompson—Cariboo
Heather McPherson†	New Democrat	Edmonton—Strathcona
Alexandra Mendès	Liberal	Brossard—Saint-Lambert	Assistant Deputy Speaker of the House of Commons
Hon. Maryam Monsef	Liberal	Peterborough—Kawartha	Minister for Women and Gender Equality
Kristina Michaud†	Bloc Québécois	Avignon—La Mitis—Matane—Matapédia
Hon. Joyce Murray	Liberal	Vancouver Quadra	Minister of Digital Government
Hon. Mary Ng	Liberal	Markham-Thornhill	Minister of Small Business, Export Promotion and International Trade
Christine Normandin†	Bloc Québécois	Saint-Jean
Jennifer O'Connell	Liberal	Pickering—Uxbridge
Monique Pauzé	Bloc Québécois	Repentigny
Hon. Ginette Petitpas Taylor	Liberal	Moncton-Riverview-Dieppe	Deputy Government Whip.
Mumilaaq Qaqqaq	New Democrat	Nunavut
Hon. Carla Qualtrough†	Liberal	Delta	Minister of Employment, Workforce Development and Disability Inclusion
Yasmin Ratansi	Independent	Don Valley East	Resigned from the Liberal caucus in November 2020 to sit as an independent.
Hon. Michelle Rempel	Conservative	Calgary Nose Hill
Sherry Romanado†	Liberal	Longueuil—Charles-LeMoyne
Lianne Rood†	Conservative	Lambton—Kent—Middlesex
Jag Sahota†	Conservative	Calgary Skyview
Ruby Sahota	Liberal	Brampton North
Ya'ara Saks†††	Liberal	York Centre
Hon. Deb Schulte	Liberal	King—Vaughan	Minister of Seniors
Hon. Judy Sgro	Liberal	Humber River—Black Creek
Brenda Shanahan	Liberal	Châteauguay—Lacolle
Nelly Shin†	Conservative	Port Moody—Coquitlam
Sonia Sidhu	Liberal	Brampton South
Shannon Stubbs	Conservative	Lakeland
Hon. Filomena Tassi	Liberal	Hamilton West—Ancaster—Dundas	Minister of Labour
Anita Vandenbeld	Liberal	Ottawa West—Nepean
Karen Vecchio	Conservative	Elgin—Middlesex—London
Julie Vignola†	Bloc Québécois	Beauport—Limoilou
Cathay Wagantall	Conservative	Yorkton—Melville
Hon. Jody Wilson-Raybould	Independent	Vancouver Granville
Hon. Alice Wong	Conservative	Richmond Centre
Jean Yip	Liberal	Scarborough-Agincourt
Kate Young	Liberal	London West
Salma Zahid	Liberal	Scarborough Centre
Lenore Zann†	Liberal	Cumberland—Colchester

== Accessibility to office and equal representation ==
The Canadian Parliament has seen a dramatic increase in the number of women and racialized people that sit in the House of Commons in the last decade. However, the representation of women in the house has not always been key to the government's success. In 1921, the first federal election where the majority of women could vote took place. This was also the year that the very first woman was elected to sit in the House. Although 4 women ran, only one was elected: Agnes Campbell Macphail.

The 2019 Canadian election saw a record number of women in terms of the number of candidates as well as the proportion of women in contrast to all of the candidates. More than 700 of the 2,146 candidates were women, meaning that 34% of candidates identified as female. It was the first federal election where the data compiled on candidates’ gender identities could be possible to be other than a man or woman. Elections Canada data states that 19 of the 2,146 did not state their gender and 5 of the 2,146 candidates identified as a different identity. Since 1968, the percentage of women that have run in the Canadian Federal election has gone up by seven times, and with the 43rd Canadian Parliament setting records for representation, we can see change occurring.

One of the largest reasons why there is not a higher percentage of female candidates is because of the barriers to entry that they face. According to the Library of the Canadian Parliament, there are seven key factors that contribute to the barriers to entry that women face: gender stereotypes and discrimination, lack of confidence in their abilities, insufficient efforts to recruit female candidates, difficulties in financing their campaigns, absence of family-friendly and gender-sensitive workplaces, gender-based violence and harassment, and gender-biased media treatment. These seven reasons, identified by the Government of Canada, are the issues that must be addressed if equality is to be achieved in representation. Similarly, a book written by Newman et al. also noted similar things to be barriers to entry for women into the political landscape in Canada.

== Female representation in Canada compared to international and provincial representation ==
The number of women in the Canadian Parliament has been slowly but steadily increasing since the 1980s and has reached its highest point following the 2019 Canadian federal election where women made up 29.6% of the Canadian Parliament which is higher than the global average of 25.5% and very close to the 1995 United Nations goal of 30% female representation in government. In terms of gender representation in government, Canada outperforms a country like the United States in which the House of Representatives is made up of 27.4% women. However, in a country where women make up a slim majority of the population at 50.4% as of 2010, the 43rd Canadian Parliament still falls short when it comes to achieving gender parity in government. Canada also currently ranks 53rd in the world in gender representation in government which is behind the United Kingdom, Sweden, and Rwanda. However, with prominent Canadian political parties like the Liberals Party pledging to include more female representation in government as well as parties like the New Democratic Party putting forward a slate of candidates that was 49% women in the 2019 election, there is significant political pressure to increase the number of women representatives in government.

Canadian provinces and territories come much closer to achieving gender parity in their legislative assemblies than their federal counterparts. Similar to the rest of Canada in the province of Ontario women make up a little over half of the population at 50.7% but unlike the rest of Canada 35.5% of Ontario Member's of the Legislative Assembly are women. In Quebec, a province where women make up 50.4% of the population, gender parity is even closer to being achieved with women making up 42.4% of the National Assembly. The Northwest Territories have come the closest to achieving gender parity with women making up 48.3% of the population and 47.3% of the Legislative Assembly. The Northwest Territories is also currently the only Province or Territory in Canada that has a female Premier, Caroline Cochrane.

== See also ==
- Women in the 40th Canadian Parliament
- Women in the 41st Canadian Parliament
- Women in the 42nd Canadian Parliament
