= Women in the 42nd Canadian Parliament =

The 42nd Canadian Parliament includes a record number of female Members of Parliament, with 88 women elected to the 338-member House of Commons of Canada (26%) in the 2015 election. This represents a gain of twelve seats over the previous record of 76 women in the 41st Canadian Parliament. By contrast, the 114th United States Congress had 105 women sitting in the 435-seat United States House of Representatives.

Of those 88 women, 54 were elected for the first time in the 2015 election.

In his first speech following the election, Prime Minister-designate Justin Trudeau indicated that for the first time in Canadian history, he planned to appoint a fully gender-balanced Cabinet. On November 4, he announced a cabinet which included 15 men and 15 women.

The longest-serving woman in the 42nd Parliament is Hedy Fry, who was first elected in the 1993 election.

On April 3, 2017 four women were elected in by-elections. As of December 2017, there are 92 women currently serving in parliament, representing 27.2 per cent of elected Members of Parliament.

== Party standings ==
Party	Total women candidates in the 2015 Election	% women of total candidates in the 2015 Election	Total women elected in the 2015 Election	% women elected of total women candidates in the 2015 Election	% women elected of total elected in the 2015 Election	Total current women members of the House of Commons	% women of current members in the House of Commons
Liberal	105 (of 338)	31.1%	50 (of 184)	47.6%	27.1%	54 (of 183)	29.5%
New Democrats	145 (of 338)	42.8%	18 (of 44)	12.4%	40.9%	18 (of 44)	40.9%
Conservative	66 (of 338)	19.5%	17 (of 99)	25.7%	17.1%	19 (of 97)	19.6%
Bloc Québécois	22 (of 78)	28.2%	2 (of 10)	9.1%	20.0%	2 (of 10)	20.0%
Green	135 (of 336)	39.9%	1 (of 1)	0.74%	100%	1 (of 1)	100%
Independents						0 (of 2)	0%
Total			88 (of 338)		26.0%	94 (of 338)	27.8%
Table source:						Table source: 42nd Canadian Parliament	

== Female Members ==
† denotes women who were newly elected in the 2015 election and are serving their first term in office. †† denotes women who were not members of the 41st parliament, but previously served in another parliament. ††† denotes women who were newly elected in byelections since the 2015 election.

Name	Party	Electoral district	Notes
Leona Alleslev†	Liberal	Aurora—Oak Ridges—Richmond Hill	
Hon. Rona Ambrose	Conservative	Sturgeon River—Parkland	Leader of the Opposition
Niki Ashton	New Democrat	Churchill—Keewatinook Aski	
Hon. Carolyn Bennett	Liberal	Toronto—St. Paul's	Minister of Indigenous and Northern Affairs
Sheri Benson†	New Democrat	Saskatoon West	
Hon. Candice Bergen	Conservative	Portage—Lisgar	
Hon. Marie-Claude Bibeau†	Liberal	Compton—Stanstead	Minister of International Development and Minister responsible for La Francophonie
Rachel Blaney†	New Democrat	North Island—Powell River	
Kelly Block	Conservative	Carlton Trail—Eagle Creek	
Sylvie Boucher††	Conservative	Beauport—Côte-de-Beaupré—Île d'Orléans—Charlevoix	
Marjolaine Boutin-Sweet	New Democrat	Hochelaga	
Ruth Ellen Brosseau	New Democrat	Berthier—Maskinongé	
Celina Caesar-Chavannes†	Liberal	Whitby	
Hon. Bardish Chagger†	Liberal	Waterloo	Minister of Small Business and Tourism
Julie Dabrusin†	Liberal	Toronto—Danforth	
Pam Damoff†	Liberal	Oakville North—Burlington	
Anju Dhillon†	Liberal	Dorval—Lachine—LaSalle	
Hon. Kirsty Duncan	Liberal	Etobicoke North	Minister of Science
Linda Duncan	New Democrat	Edmonton—Strathcona	
Julie Dzerowicz†	Liberal	Davenport	
Rosemarie Falk†††	Conservative	Battlefords—Lloydminster	Elected in a by-election on December 11, 2017
Hon. Diane Finley	Conservative	Haldimand—Norfolk	
Hon. Judy Foote	Liberal	Bonavista—Burin—Trinity	Minister of Public Services and Procurement
Mona Fortier†††	Liberal	Ottawa—Vanier	Elected in a by-election on April 3, 2017
Hon. Chrystia Freeland	Liberal	University—Rosedale	Minister of Foreign Affairs
Hon. Hedy Fry	Liberal	Vancouver Centre	Longest Current Serving Female Member of Parlimanet
Cheryl Gallant	Conservative	Renfrew—Nipissing—Pembroke	
Marilène Gill†	Bloc Québécois	Manicouagan	
Marilyn Gladu†	Conservative	Sarnia—Lambton	
Pamela Goldsmith-Jones†	Liberal	West Vancouver—Sunshine Coast—Sea to Sky Country	
Hon. Karina Gould†	Liberal	Burlington	Minister of Democratic Institutions
Hon. Patty Hajdu†	Liberal	Thunder Bay—Superior North	Minister of Status of Women then Minister of Employment, Workforce and Labour
Cheryl Hardcastle†	New Democrat	Windsor—Tecumseh	
Rachael Harder†	Conservative	Lethbridge	
Carol Hughes	New Democrat	Algoma—Manitoulin—Kapuskasing	
Gudie Hutchings†	Liberal	Long Range Mountains	
Georgina Jolibois†	New Democrat	Desnethé—Missinippi—Churchill River	
Hon. Mélanie Joly†	Liberal	Ahuntsic—Cartierville	Minister of Canadian Heritage
Yvonne Jones	Liberal	Labrador	
Bernadette Jordan†	Liberal	South Shore—St. Margaret's	
Iqra Khalid†	Liberal	Mississauga—Erin Mills	
Kamal Khera†	Liberal	Brampton West	
Stephanie Kusie†††	Conservative	Calgary Midnapore	Elected in a by-election on April 3, 2017
Jenny Kwan†	New Democrat	Vancouver East	
Emmanuella Lambropoulos†††	Liberal	Saint-Laurent	Elected in a by-election on April 3, 2017
Linda Lapointe†	Liberal	Rivière-des-Mille-Îles	
Hélène Laverdière	New Democrat	Laurier—Sainte-Marie	
Hon. Diane Lebouthillier†	Liberal	Gaspésie—Les Îles-de-la-Madeleine	Minister of National Revenue
Hon. Kellie Leitch	Conservative	Simcoe—Grey	
Alaina Lockhart†	Liberal	Fundy Royal	
Karen Ludwig†	Liberal	New Brunswick Southwest	
Sheila Malcolmson†	New Democrat	Nanaimo—Ladysmith	
Irene Mathyssen	New Democrat	London—Fanshawe	
Elizabeth May	Green	Saanich—Gulf Islands	Leader of the Green Party
Karen McCrimmon†	Liberal	Kanata—Carleton	
Hon. Catherine McKenna†	Liberal	Ottawa Centre	Minister of the Environment and Climate Change
Cathy McLeod	Conservative	Kamloops—Thompson—Cariboo	
Alexandra Mendès††	Liberal	Brossard—Saint-Lambert	
Hon. MaryAnn Mihychuk	Liberal	Kildonan—St. Paul	Formerly Minister of Employment, Workforce and Labour
Hon. Maryam Monsef†	Liberal	Peterborough—Kawartha	Minister of Democratic Institutions then Minister of Status of Women
Christine Moore	New Democrat	Abitibi—Témiscamingue	
Joyce Murray	Liberal	Vancouver Quadra	
Eva Nassif†	Liberal	Vimy	
Mary Ng†††	Liberal	Markham-Thornhill	Elected in a by-election on April 3, 2017
Jennifer O'Connell†	Liberal	Pickering—Uxbridge	
Monique Pauzé†	Groupe parlementaire québécois	Repentigny	
Ginette Petitpas Taylor†	Liberal	Moncton-Riverview-Dieppe	
Hon. Jane Philpott†	Liberal	Markham—Stouffville	
Anne Minh-Thu Quach	New Democrat	Salaberry—Suroît	
Hon. Carla Qualtrough†	Liberal	Delta	Minister of Sport and Persons with Disabilities
Hon. Lisa Raitt	Conservative	Milton	
Tracey Ramsey	New Democrat	Essex	
Yasmin Ratansi††	Liberal	Don Valley East	
Hon. Michelle Rempel	Conservative	Calgary Nose Hill	
Sherry Romanado†	Liberal	Longueuil—Charles-LeMoyne	
Kim Rudd†	Liberal	Northumberland—Peterborough South	
Ruby Sahota†	Liberal	Brampton North	
Brigitte Sansoucy†	New Democrat	Saint-Hyacinthe—Bagot	
Deb Schulte†	Liberal	King—Vaughan	
Hon. Judy Sgro	Liberal	Humber River—Black Creek	
Brenda Shanahan†	Liberal	Châteauguay—Lacolle	
Sonia Sidhu†	Liberal	Brampton South	
Shannon Stubbs†	Conservative	Lakeland	
Filomena Tassi†	Liberal	Hamilton West—Ancaster—Dundas	
Karine Trudel†	New Democrat	Jonquière	
Anita Vandenbeld†	Liberal	Ottawa West—Nepean	
Karen Vecchio†	Conservative	Elgin—Middlesex—London	
Cathay Wagantall†	Conservative	Yorkton—Melville	
Dianne Watts†	Conservative	South Surrey—White Rock	
Hon. Jody Wilson-Raybould†	Liberal	Vancouver Granville	Minister of Justice and Attorney General of Canada
Hon. Alice Wong	Conservative	Richmond Centre	
Jean Yip†††	Liberal	Scarborough-Agincourt	Elected in a by-election on December 11, 2017
Kate Young†	Liberal	London West	
Salma Zahid†	Liberal	Scarborough Centre	

== See also ==
- Women in the 40th Canadian Parliament
- Women in the 41st Canadian Parliament
