= Oakville North—Burlington =

Oakville North—Burlington could refer to:

- Oakville North—Burlington (federal electoral district)
- Oakville North—Burlington (provincial electoral district)
