= Canadian House of Commons Standing Committee on Industry, Science and Technology =

Standing committee of the House of Commons of Canada

The House of Commons Standing Committee on Industry and Technology (INDU) is a standing committee of the House of Commons of Canada.

== Mandate ==
- The mandate and management of Department of Industry and its subsidiary agencies:
- Any government policies having to do with:
  - Industry and technology capability
  - Scientific research and development
  - Telecommunications policy
  - Investment, trade, small business and tourism
  - Rules and services supporting the effective operation of the market
- Fluctuation of gas prices
- The Perimeter Institute for Theoretical Physics
- The e-commerce market in Canada

The committee was formerly called the Standing Committee on Industry, Science and Technology. The word "Science" was removed upon the creation of a separate Standing Committee on Science and Research at the beginning of the 44th Canadian Parliament

== Membership ==
As of the 45th Canadian Parliament:

Party	Member	District
Liberal	Ben Carr, chair	Winnipeg South Centre, MB
Conservative	Raquel Dancho, vice chair	Kildonan—St. Paul, MB
Bloc Québécois	Gabriel Ste-Marie, vice chair	Joliette—Manawan, QC
Liberal	Parm Bains	Richmond East—Steveston, BC
Liberal	Karim Bardeesy	Taiaiko'n—Parkdale—High Park, ON
Conservative	Kathy Borrelli	Windsor—Tecumseh—Lakeshore, ON
Liberal	Nathaniel Erskine-Smith	Beaches—East York, ON
Conservative	Ted Falk	Provencher, MB
Conservative	Michael Guglielmin	Vaughan—Woodbridge, ON
Liberal	Dominique O'Rourke	Guelph, ON

== Subcommittees ==
- Subcommittee on Agenda and Procedure (SIND)
