= John Aldag =

Canadian politician

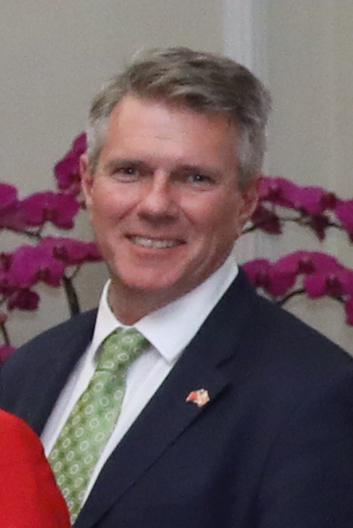

Member of Parliament for Cloverdale—Langley City
- In office September 20, 2021 – May 31, 2024
- Preceded by: Tamara Jansen
- Succeeded by: Tamara Jansen
- In office October 19, 2015 – October 21, 2019
- Preceded by: Riding established
- Succeeded by: Tamara Jansen

Personal details
- Born: April 18, 1963 (age 63) Gull Lake, Saskatchewan, Canada
- Party: Liberal
- Other political affiliations: New Democratic (BC)
- Spouse: Elaine St. John
- Profession: Public servant, politician

John W. Aldag (born April 18, 1963) is a Canadian politician who represented the riding of Cloverdale—Langley City in the House of Commons of Canada as a Liberal MP from 2015 to 2019 and 2021 to 2024.

He was first elected in the 2015 federal election, and served until his defeat in the 2019 Canadian federal election. In the 2021 federal election Aldag won his seat back over incumbent Conservative Tamara Jansen.

== Early life and career ==
Aldag was born in rural Saskatchewan. He earned an MBA from Royal Roads University and had a 32-year career with Parks Canada, including postings in Whitehorse, Lake Louise, Yoho, Waterloo and Langley, where he was the administrator of Fort Langley National Historic Site before his entry into politics. Aldag took an unpaid leave from Parks Canada in December 2013 to begin campaigning for election to office, which he ultimately won with nearly 46% of the vote. He resigned his position upon being confirmed as the elected candidate by Elections Canada on October 26, 2015.

Aldag and his wife, Elaine St. John, a doctor, have two daughters and one son, and had lived in Langley for a decade at the time of his election to the House of Commons.

== Politics ==
Aldag was elected in the 2015 election as a Member of Parliament for Cloverdale—Langley City. In the 42nd Canadian Parliament, he was appointed to two parliamentary committees; the Environment and Sustainable Development committee and the Special Joint Committee on Physician-Assisted Dying, an issue in which he consulted extensively with his constituents. The issue of Physician-Assisted Dying touched him, causing him to be a proponent of families having conversations about their wishes in these situations. He was later named as well to the House of Commons Special Committee on Electoral Reform. Aldag introduced Private Member's Bill C-374 which, if adopted, would provide a seat on the Historic Sites and Monuments Board of Canada for First Nations, Inuit and Métis representation. The federal by-election to replace him was scheduled for December 16, 2024 and was won by Jansen.

Aldag announced he would resign his seat effective May 27, 2024, to seek the BC New Democratic Party nomination in Langley-Abbotsford in the 2024 British Columbia election. He resigned his seat May 31, 2024 and was officially nominated as the NDP candidate in Langley-Abbotsford on July 20, 2024, but lost to BC Conservatives candidate Harman Bhangu in the 2024 British Columbia general election. He would later replace Nasima Nastoh as the Liberal candidate in Langley Township—Fraser Heights before losing in that riding in the 2025 Canadian federal election to Conservative incumbent Tako van Popta.

== Electoral record ==
2025 Canadian federal election: Langley Township—Fraser Heights
Party	Candidate	Votes	%	±%	Expenditures
Conservative	Tako van Popta	33,574	51.37	+7.45	$55,615.96
Liberal	John Aldag	28,034	42.89	+13.31	$58,816.72
New Democratic	Holly Isaac	2,611	3.99	–15.54	$45.29
Green	Debora Soutar	491	0.75	–1.67	$178.81
Libertarian	Alex Joehl	347	0.53	–	none listed
People's	Sepehr Haghighat	303	0.46	–4.04	$315.59
Total valid votes/expense limit		65,360	99.41	–	$137,739.68
Total rejected ballots		389	0.59	+0.10	
Turnout		65,749	70.57	+5.92	
Eligible voters		93,162			
Conservative notional hold		Swing		–2.93	
Source: Elections Canada

2024 British Columbia general election: Langley-Abbotsford
Party	Candidate	Votes	%	±%	Expenditures
Conservative	Harman Bhangu	14,341	55.65	+48.0	$64,184.86
New Democratic	John Aldag	8,691	33.73	-1.5	$32,984.54
Green	Melissa Snazell	1,434	5.56	-5.9	$425.60
Independent	Karen Long	1,104	4.28	–	$14,388.14
Libertarian	Alex Joehl	200	0.78	–	$659.35
Total valid votes/expense limit		25,770	99.74	–	$71,700.08
Total rejected ballots		66	0.26	–	
Turnout		25,836	59.46	–	
Registered voters		43,448			
Conservative notional gain from BC United		Swing		N/A (Note: Swing cannot be calculated as BC United did not run a candidate in this riding.)	
Source: Elections BC

2021 Canadian federal election: Cloverdale—Langley City
Party	Candidate	Votes	%	±%	Expenditures
Liberal	John Aldag	20,877	39.21	+3.99	$111,123.12
Conservative	Tamara Jansen	19,223	36.10	-1.63	$85,561.60
New Democratic	Rajesh Jayaprakash	10,587	19.88	+0.94	$13,177.92
People's	Ian Kennedy	2,563	4.81	+3.14	$0.00
Total valid votes/expense limit		53,250	99.06	–	$116,950.48
Total rejected ballots		508	0.94	+0.20	
Turnout		53,758	60.85	-3.70	
Eligible voters		88,348			
Liberal gain from Conservative		Swing		+2.81	
Source: Elections Canada

2019 Canadian federal election: Cloverdale—Langley City
Party	Candidate	Votes	%	±%	Expenditures
Conservative	Tamara Jansen	20,936	37.73	+2.96	$70,620.42
Liberal	John Aldag	19,542	35.22	-10.31	$105,884.21
New Democratic	Rae Banwarie	10,508	18.94	+3.29	$15,133
Green	Caelum Nutbrown	3,572	6.44	+2.38	none listed
People's	Ian Kennedy	930	1.68	-	$464
Total valid votes/expense limit		55,488	99.26		
Total rejected ballots		415	0.74	+0.40	
Turnout		55,903	64.55	-4.85	
Eligible voters		86,610			
Conservative gain from Liberal		Swing		+6.63	
Source: Elections Canada

2015 Canadian federal election: Cloverdale—Langley City
Party	Candidate	Votes	%	±%	Expenditures
Liberal	John Aldag	24,617	45.52	+33.72	$48,139.65
Conservative	Dean Drysdale	18,800	34.77	-22.60	$164,422.49
New Democratic	Rebecca Smith	8,463	15.65	-9.02	$12,325.60
Green	Scott Anderson	2,195	4.06	-0.56	$5,846.04
Total valid votes/expense limit		54,075	99.66		$209,882.99
Total rejected ballots		186	0.34	–	
Turnout		54,261	69.40	–	
Eligible voters		78,189			
Liberal gain from Conservative		Swing		+28.16	
Source: Elections Canada
