= 2024 Cloverdale—Langley City federal by-election =

- December 16, 2024

Riding of Cloverdale—Langley City
- Turnout: 16.27% ▼44.58 pp
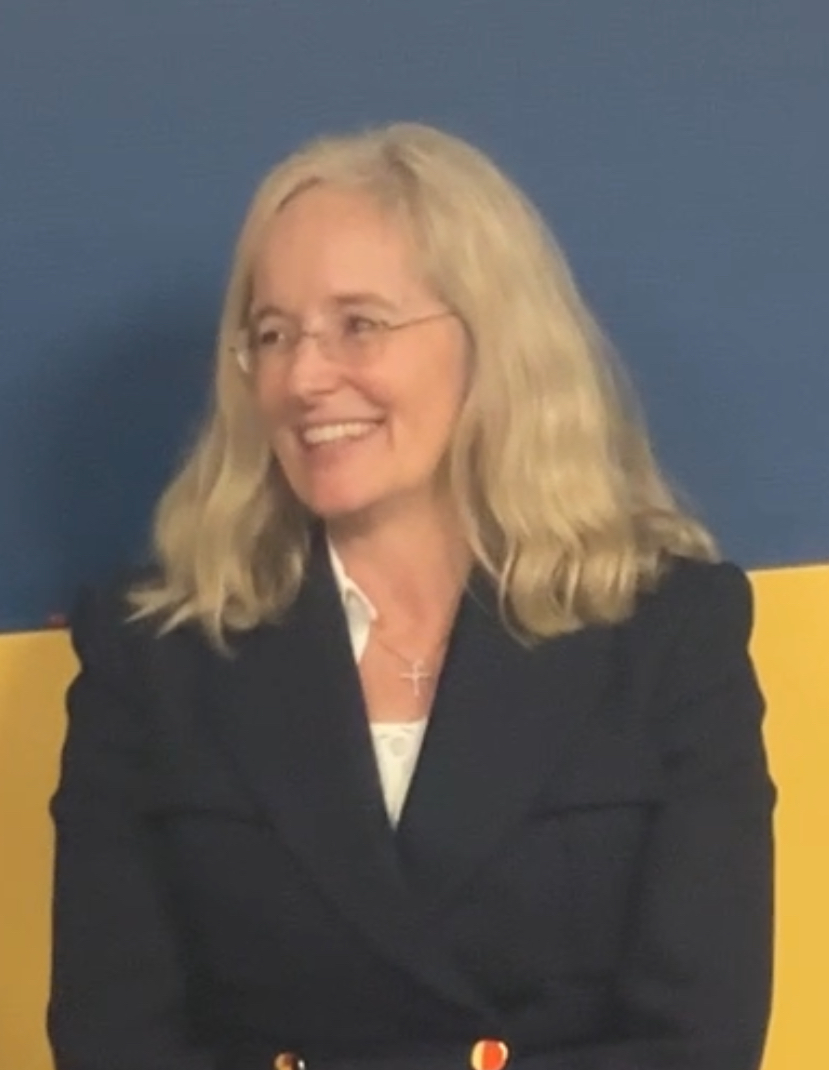
	First party	Second party	Third party
		LPC	NDP
Candidate	Tamara Jansen	Madison Fleischer	Vanessa Sharma
Party	Conservative	Liberal	New Democratic
Popular vote	9,931	2,411	1,875
Percentage	66.30%	16.9%	12.52%
Swing	▲30.20 pp	▼23.18 pp	▼7.36 pp
MP before election
John Aldag
Liberal
Elected MP
Tamara Jansen
Conservative

A by-election was held in the federal riding of Cloverdale—Langley City in British Columbia, Canada on December 16, 2024, following the resignation of incumbent Liberal MP John Aldag. It was won by former MP Tamara Jansen by a hefty margin, flipping the seat for the Conservatives. This was the third seat lost in a by-election in one year for the Liberals.

== Background ==
The riding of Cloverdale—Langley City was vacated on May 31, 2024, upon the resignation of Liberal MP John Aldag to run for the BC NDP in Langley-Abbotsford in the 2024 British Columbia general election.

Due to the Canada Post strike, Elections Canada did not provide voter information cards for the by-election.

The by-election came at a time of waning popularity for the government of Prime Minister Justin Trudeau. Furthermore, it was held amidst the fallout caused by the resignation of Chrystia Freeland, Canada's Minister of Finance and deputy Prime Minister, which occurred on the same day.

== Constituency ==
Cloverdale—Langley City is a suburban riding in the Lower Mainland outside Vancouver. It covers the Cloverdale area of Surrey as well as the entire City of Langley, and a small part of Langley Township.

The seat has changed hands three times in the previous three federal elections between Liberal John Aldag and Conservative Tamara Jansen.

== Candidates ==
Former MP Tamara Jansen, who defeated Aldag in 2019 before losing a rematch in 2021 was the Conservative candidate. She won the nomination on October 21, 2024.

The Liberal candidate was small business owner Madison Fleischer. Fleischer faced controversy during the campaign from the local Waceya Métis Society for being unable to provide evidence substantiating her claims of Métis heritage.

The NDP candidate was Vanessa Sharma, who is Equity Vice President at the Canadian Labour Congress. Pat McCutcheon was the Green candidate. Running for the People's Party of Canada (PPC) was Ian Kennedy, who was the candidate for the party in 2021 and 2019. The Libertarian candidate was Alex Joehl, who is the leader of the Libertarian Party of British Columbia.

Nominations closed on November 25, 2024.

On November 10, 2024, the writ for the by-election was issued. The by-election was held on December 16, 2024.

== Results ==
Canadian federal by-election, December 16, 2024: Cloverdale—Langley City Resignation of John Aldag
Party	Candidate	Votes	%	±%
Conservative	Tamara Jansen	9,936	66.23	+30.13
Liberal	Madison Fleischer	2,411	16.07	-23.13
New Democratic	Vanessa Sharma	1,879	12.52	-7.36
Green	Patrick McCutcheon	580	3.87	—
People's	Ian Kennedy	134	0.89	-3.92
Libertarian	Alex Joehl	62	0.41	—
Total valid votes		15,002		
Total rejected ballots		28	0.19	-0.76
Turnout		15,030	16.33	-44.52
Eligible voters		92,061		
Conservative gain from Liberal		Swing		+26.63
Source: Elections Canada

== 2021 result ==
2021 Canadian federal election: Cloverdale—Langley City
Party	Candidate	Votes	%	±%	Expenditures
Liberal	John Aldag	20,877	39.21	+3.99	$111,123.12
Conservative	Tamara Jansen	19,223	36.10	-1.63	$85,561.60
New Democratic	Rajesh Jayaprakash	10,587	19.88	+0.94	$13,177.92
People's	Ian Kennedy	2,563	4.81	+3.14	$0.00
Total valid votes/expense limit		53,250	99.06	–	$116,950.48
Total rejected ballots		508	0.94	+0.20	
Turnout		53,758	60.85	-3.70	
Eligible voters		88,348			
Liberal gain from Conservative		Swing		+2.81	
Source: Elections Canada

== See also ==
- By-elections to the 44th Canadian Parliament
