= Effie Triantafilopoulos =

Canadian politician

Effie Triantafilopoulos MPP
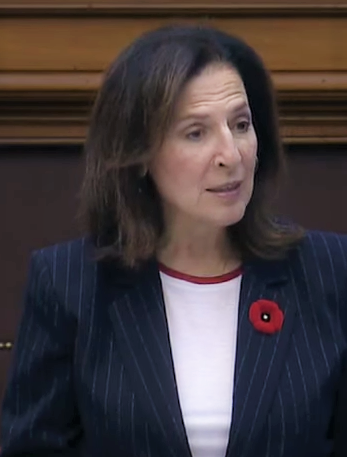
- Effie speaking in the Ontario legislature.

Parliamentary Assistant to the Minister of Economic Development, Job Creation and Trade
- Incumbent
- Assumed office June 29, 2022
- Minister: Vic Fedeli
- Premier: Doug Ford

Parliamentary Assistant to the Minister of Long-Term Care
- In office June 26, 2019 – June 1, 2022
- Minister: Merrilee Fullerton
- Premier: Doug Ford

Deputy Speaker of the House of Commons

Member of the Ontario Provincial Parliament for Oakville North—Burlington
- Incumbent
- Assumed office June 7, 2018
- Preceded by: Riding established

Personal details
- Born: Greece
- Party: Progressive Conservative Party of Ontario
- Other political affiliations: Canadian Progressive Conservative Party (until 2003) Canadian Conservative Party (Since 2003)
- Education: Osgoode Hall Law School (1997–1999)
- Occupation: Lawyer and political staffer
- Committees: Legislative assembly of Ontario: Standing Committee on Finance and Economic Affairs.
- Website: https://effiempp.ca/

Effie J. Triantafilopoulos is a Canadian politician and lawyer who was elected to the Legislative Assembly of Ontario in the 2018 provincial election. She represents the riding of Oakville North—Burlington as a member of the Progressive Conservative Party of Ontario.

Effie was elected as the Progressive Conservative MPP for Oakville North-Burlington in June 2018. Effie serves as the Parliamentary Assistant to the Minister of Economic Development, Job Creation and Trade and as a member of the Standing Committee on Finance and Economic Affairs. Previously she served as a member of the Standing Committees on Justice Policy and Social Policy, and of the Select Committee on Emergency Management Oversight. She is Senior Counsel at Vassos Law LLP and also serves on the Board of the World Hellenic Interparliamentary Association.

As Chief of Staff to Ministers at the Departments of Industry, Treasury Board, and External Affairs and International Trade she was involved with the implementation of the Canada-U.S. Free Trade Agreement.

Her experience in international trade led to her role as Deputy Director for the Summits Management Office of Foreign Affairs and International Trade during the 2010 G20 Summit in Canada.

Prior to running for the Progressive Conservative Party of Ontario, Triantafilopoulos was a candidate for the Conservative Party of Canada in the 2015 election. She placed second in Oakville North—Burlington, behind Pam Damoff. She was also a candidate for the Progressive Conservative Party of Ontario in the riding of Mississauga South during the 2014 Ontario provincial election, finishing second to Charles Sousa. In addition, she has been chief of staff for several federal Conservative ministers.

== Electoral record ==
2022 Ontario general election: Oakville North—Burlington
Party	Candidate	Votes	%	±%	Expenditures
Progressive Conservative	Effie Triantafilopoulos	22,221	47.18	+0.77	$129,212
Liberal	Kaniz Mouli	16,631	35.31	+10.95	$70,625
New Democratic	Rhyan Vincent-Smith	4,673	9.92	–14.46	$19,005
Green	Ali Hosny	2,027	4.30	+0.60	$1,225
New Blue	Doru Marin Gordan	1,097	2.33	–	$1,554
Ontario Party	Jill Service	446	0.95	–	none listed
Total valid votes		47,095	99.38		
Total rejected, unmarked and declined ballots		294	0.62	+0.01	
Turnout		47,389	46.89	–13.31	
Eligible voters		101,071			
Progressive Conservative hold		Swing		–5.09	
Source: Elections Ontario

2018 Ontario general election: Oakville North—Burlington
Party	Candidate	Votes	%
Progressive Conservative	Effie Triantafilopoulos	25,691	46.41
New Democratic	Saima Zaidi	13,496	24.38
Liberal	Alvin Tedjo	13,487	24.37
Green	Marianne Workman	2,052	3.71
Libertarian	Charles Zach	403	0.73
Trillium	Frank De Luca	222	0.40
Total valid votes		55,351	100.0
Progressive Conservative pickup new district.			
Source: Elections Ontario

2015 Canadian federal election: Oakville North—Burlington
Party	Candidate	Votes	%	±%	Expenditures
Liberal	Pam Damoff	28,415	46.74	+19.77	$87,266.36
Conservative	Effie Triantafilopoulos	26,342	43.33	-10.83	$133,882.22
New Democratic	Janice Best	4,405	7.25	-8.26	$10,112.38
Green	Adnan Shahbaz	968	1.6	-1.5	$2,273.28
Libertarian	David Clement	666	1.1	–	$3,998.74
Total valid votes/Expense limit		60,796	100.0		$223,412.78
Total rejected ballots		272	–	–	
Turnout		61,068	–	–	
Eligible voters		85,462			
Source: Elections Canada

2014 Ontario general election: Mississauga South (provincial electoral district)
Party	Candidate	Votes	%	±%
Liberal	Charles Sousa	22,192	50.76	+0.05
Progressive Conservative	Effie Triantafilopoulos	14,514	33.20	-2.89
New Democratic	Boris Rosolak	4,649	10.63	+0.57
Green	Lloyd Jones	1,418	3.24	+1.10
None of the Above	Andrew Weber	591	1.35	
Libertarian	James Judson	355	0.81	
Total valid votes		43,719	100.0	
Liberal hold		Swing		+1.47
Source: Elections Ontario
