= Oakville North—Burlington (provincial electoral district) =

Provincial electoral district in Ontario, Canada

Coordinates: 43.414°N 79.784°W

Ontario electoral district
- Oakville North—Burlington in relation to nearby electoral districts

Provincial electoral district
- Legislature: Legislative Assembly of Ontario
MPP
Effie Triantafilopoulos
Progressive Conservative
- District created: 2015
- First contested: 2018
- Last contested: 2025

Demographics
- Population (2016): 129,080
- Electors (2018): 92,512
- Area (km²): 88
- Pop. density (per km²): 1,466.8
- Census division: Halton
- Census subdivision(s): Burlington, Oakville

Oakville North—Burlington is a provincial electoral district in Ontario, Canada. It elects one member to the Legislative Assembly of Ontario. This riding was created in 2015.

== Members of Provincial Parliament ==
Oakville North—Burlington
Assembly	Years	Member	Party
Riding created from Halton
42nd	2018–2022	Effie Triantafilopoulos	Progressive Conservative
43rd	2022–2025	Effie Triantafilopoulos	Progressive Conservative
43rd	2025–present	Effie Triantafilopoulos	Progressive Conservative

== Election results ==
=== Winning party in each polling division ===
Oakville North—Burlington (provincial electoral district)
2025 Ontario provincial election

2022 Ontario provincial election

=== 2025 ===
2025 Ontario general election
Party	Candidate	Votes	%	±%
Progressive Conservative	Effie Triantafilopoulos	25,580	49.70	+2.52
Liberal	Kaniz Mouli	21,053	40.90	+5.59
New Democratic	Caleb Smolenaars	2,769	5.38	–4.54
Green	Ali Hosny	1,411	2.74	–1.56
New Blue	Charles Wroblewski	659	1.28	–1.05
Total valid votes/expense limit		51,472	99.48	+0.10
Total rejected, unmarked, and declined ballots		268	0.52	–0.10
Turnout		51,740	46.78	–0.11
Eligible voters		110,611		
Progressive Conservative hold		Swing		–1.54
Source: Elections Ontario

=== 2022 ===
2022 Ontario general election
Party	Candidate	Votes	%	±%	Expenditures
Progressive Conservative	Effie Triantafilopoulos	22,221	47.18	+0.77	$129,212
Liberal	Kaniz Mouli	16,631	35.31	+10.95	$70,625
New Democratic	Rhyan Vincent-Smith	4,673	9.92	−14.46	$19,005
Green	Ali Hosny	2,027	4.30	+0.60	$1,225
New Blue	Doru Marin Gordan	1,097	2.33	N/A	$1,554
Ontario Party	Jill Service	446	0.95	N/A	none listed
Total valid votes		47,095	99.38	–0.01	
Total rejected, unmarked, and declined ballots		294	0.62	+0.01	
Turnout		47,389	46.89	–13.31	
Eligible voters		99,002			
Progressive Conservative hold		Swing		–5.09	
Source(s): "Summary of Valid Votes Cast for Each Candidate" (PDF). Elections Ontario. 2022. Archived from the original on May 18, 2023.; "Statistical Summary by Electoral District" (PDF). Elections Ontario. 2022. Archived from the original on May 21, 2023.

=== 2018 ===
2018 Ontario general election
Party	Candidate	Votes	%	±%	Expenditures
Progressive Conservative	Effie Triantafilopoulos	25,691	46.41	+9.60	$63,206
New Democratic	Saima Zaidi	13,496	24.38	+12.64	$4,724
Liberal	Alvin Tedjo	13,487	24.37	–21.77	$29,863
Green	Marianne Workman	2,052	3.71	+0.33	$81
Libertarian	Charles Zach	403	0.73	N/A	none listed
Trillium	Frank De Luca	222	0.40	N/A	none listed
Total valid votes		55,351	99.39		
Total rejected, unmarked and declined ballots		342	0.61		
Turnout		55,693	60.20		
Eligible voters		92,512			
Progressive Conservative notional gain from Liberal		Swing		–1.52	
Source: Elections Ontario

=== 2014 Redistributed ===
2014 general election redistributed results
Party	Vote	%
Liberal	19,644	46.14
Progressive Conservative	15,671	36.81
New Democratic	4,998	11.74
Green	1,441	3.38
Others	824	1.93

== See also ==
- List of Ontario provincial electoral districts
- Canadian provincial electoral districts
- Oakville North—Burlington (federal electoral district)
