= Carol Anstey =

Canadian politician (born 1974)

Carol Anstey MP

Member of Parliament for Long Range Mountains
- Incumbent
- Assumed office April 28, 2025
- Preceded by: Gudie Hutchings

Personal details
- Born: October 16, 1974 (age 51)
- Party: Conservative
- Spouse: Dwayne Anstey

Carol Ann Anstey (née Brake; born October 16, 1974) MP is a Canadian politician from the Conservative Party of Canada. She is also an author and real estate agent. On June 30, 2026, Anstey was appointed shadow minister of Energy and Natural resources.

== Career ==
Anstey was elected Member of Parliament for Long Range Mountains in the 2025 Canadian federal election. She contested the seat in the 2021 election. Anstey is a real estate agent by profession; she is also author of the book Called to his purpose.

At the time of the 2025 Canadian federal election, Anstey lived in Deer Lake, Newfoundland and Labrador.

== Publications ==
- Anstey, Carol (2019). Called to his purpose: exposing Satan's plan to destroy your destiny. Primedia eLaunch. ISBN 9781684547401.

== Electoral record ==
2025 Canadian federal election: Long Range Mountains
Party	Candidate	Votes	%	±%	Expenditures
Conservative	Carol Anstey	23,232	50.35	+10.99	$129,181.74
Liberal	Don Bradshaw	19,726	42.75	−1.64	$108,417.70
New Democratic	Sarah Parsons	2,011	4.36	−7.57	$4,829.86
Independent	Robbie Coles	637	1.38	N/A	none listed
People's	Pamela Geiger	537	1.16	−3.17	$0.00
Total valid votes/expense limit		46,143	99.03	+0.28	$147,643.43
Total rejected ballots		452	0.97	–0.28	
Turnout		46,595	65.00		
Eligible voters		71,680			
Conservative notional gain from Liberal		Swing		+6.32	
Source: Elections Canada

2021 Canadian federal election: Long Range Mountains
Party	Candidate	Votes	%	±%	Expenditures
Liberal	Gudie Hutchings	16,178	44.39	-2.97	$92,705.20
Conservative	Carol Anstey	14,344	39.36	+11.06	$56,261.52
New Democratic	Kaila Mintz	4,347	11.93	-7.87	$6,169.08
People's	Darrell Shelley	1,578	4.33	–	none listed
Total valid votes/expense limit		36,447	98.75		$125,696.31
Total rejected ballots		461	1.25	-0.23	
Turnout		36,908	52.57	-2.61	
Registered voters		70,208			
Liberal hold		Swing		-7.02	
Source: Elections Canada
