= Raquel Dancho =

Canadian politician (born 1990)

Raquel Dancho MP
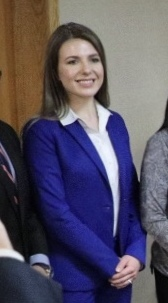
- Dancho in 2018

Member of Parliament for Kildonan—St. Paul
- Incumbent
- Assumed office October 21, 2019
- Preceded by: MaryAnn Mihychuk

Personal details
- Born: April 16, 1990 (age 36) Beausejour, Manitoba, Canada
- Party: Conservative
- Spouse: Scott Gurski (m. 2021)
- Children: 1
- Education: McGill University (BA)

Raquel Dancho MP (born April 16, 1990) is a Canadian politician who serves as the member of Parliament (MP) for Kildonan—St. Paul, Manitoba. A member of the Conservative Party, Dancho was elected following the 2019 Canadian federal election.

== Early life ==
Dancho was raised in the town of Beausejour, Manitoba. She attended McGill University first as a business student before switching to political science. Upon finishing her education, Dancho returned to Manitoba where she unsuccessfully sought a seat in the Legislative Assembly of Manitoba, after which she worked for several ministers in Brian Pallister's government.

== Political career ==
Dancho unsuccessfully contested the district of Wolseley for the Progressive Conservatives in the 2016 provincial election.

Following the 2019 Canadian federal election in which was elected in the riding of Kildonan-St. Paul for the Conservatives she was appointed to the Official Opposition's Shadow Cabinet by Andrew Scheer, serving as Shadow Minister for Diversity, Inclusion and Youth.

Dancho supported Erin O'Toole in the 2020 Conservative Party of Canada leadership election.

In November 2021 she was appointed by O'Toole the Shadow Minister for Public Safety and vice-chair of the Standing Committee on Public Safety and National Security (SECU).

On February 25, 2022, interim Conservative leader Candice Bergen re-appointed Dancho the Shadow Minister for Public Safety.

She was elected vice chair of the Canadian House of Commons Standing Committee on Industry, Science and Technology in the 45th Canadian Parliament in 2025.

== Personal life ==
Dancho began a relationship with Scott Gurski in 2012. The couple became engaged in 2018 and married in October 2021. In June 2023, Dancho announced that she was expecting their first child due in November.

At the time of the 2025 Canadian federal election, she lived in East St. Paul, Manitoba.

== Electoral record ==
=== Federal ===
2025 Canadian federal election: Kildonan—St. Paul
** Preliminary results — Not yet official **
Party	Candidate	Votes	%	±%	Expenditures
Conservative	Raquel Dancho	26,366	47.49	+5.04	
Liberal	Thomas Naaykens	24,818	44.70	+16.79	
New Democratic	Emily Clark	3,853	6.94	–16.86	
People's	Erik Holmes	486	0.88	–4.54	
Total valid votes/expense limit					
Total rejected ballots					
Turnout		55,523	71.90		
Eligible voters		77,223			
Conservative notional hold		Swing		–5.88	
Source: Elections Canada

2021 Canadian federal election: Kildonan—St. Paul
Party	Candidate	Votes	%	±%	Expenditures
Conservative	Raquel Dancho	18,375	41.8	-3.0	$79,711.15
Liberal	Mary-Jane Bennett	12,934	29.4	+1.5	$30,391.22
New Democratic	Emily Clark	10,313	23.5	+2.3	$5,804.65
People's	Sean Howe	2,325	5.3	+4.1	$2,327.71
Total valid votes/expense limit		43,947	99.2	–	$105,384.72
Total rejected ballots		337	0.8		
Turnout		44,284	66.1		
Eligible voters		66,990			
Conservative hold		Swing		-2.3	
Source: Elections Canada

2019 Canadian federal election: Kildonan—St. Paul
Party	Candidate	Votes	%	±%	Expenditures
Conservative	Raquel Dancho	19,856	44.8	+4.96	$92,599.19
Liberal	MaryAnn Mihychuk	12,356	27.9	-14.76	none listed
New Democratic	Evan Krosney	9,387	21.2	+6.91	none listed
Green	Rylan Reed	1,777	4.0	+2.22	$0.00
People's	Martin Deck	510	1.2	–	none listed
Christian Heritage	Spencer Katerynuk	304	0.7	-0.41	$2,640.00
Independent	Eduard Hiebert	108	0.2	-0.12	$741.74
Total valid votes/expense limit		44,298	100.0		
Total rejected ballots		222			
Turnout		44,520	67.7		
Eligible voters		65,719			
Conservative gain from Liberal		Swing		+9.99	
Source: Elections Canada

=== Provincial ===
2016 Manitoba general election: Wolseley
Party	Candidate	Votes	%	±%	Expenditures
New Democratic	Rob Altemeyer	3,037	41.27	-19.46	$32,887.29
Green	David Nickarz	2,645	35.94	+16.30	$15,710.81
Progressive Conservative	Raquel Dancho	945	12.84	+0.64	$7,262.81
Liberal	Shandi Strong	653	8.87	+1.45	$3,844.07
Manitoba	Wayne Sturby	79	1.07		$1,094.12
Total valid votes/expense limit		7,359	98.92		$39,244.00
Total rejected ballots		80	1.08	+0.29	
Turnout		7,439	63.26	+7.66	
Eligible voters		11,759			
New Democratic hold		Swing		-17.88	
Source: Elections Manitoba
