= Cloverdale—Langley City =

Federal electoral district in British Columbia, Canada

Coordinates: 49.1271°N 122.7256°W

British Columbia electoral district
- Interactive map of riding boundaries from the 2025 federal election

Federal electoral district
- Legislature: House of Commons
MP
Tamara Jansen
Conservative
- District created: 2013
- First contested: 2015
- Last contested: 2025
- District webpage: profile, map

Demographics
- Population (2021): 130,665
- Electors (2024): 88,348
- Area (km²): 59.47
- Pop. density (per km²): 2,197.2
- Census division: Metro Vancouver
- Census subdivision(s): Surrey (part), Langley

Cloverdale—Langley City is a federal electoral district located in the Metro Vancouver area of British Columbia.

== History ==
Cloverdale—Langley City was created by the 2012 federal electoral boundaries redistribution and was legally defined in the 2013 representation order. It came into effect upon the call of the October 2015 Canadian federal election. It was created out of parts of Langley, South Surrey—White Rock—Cloverdale and Fleetwood—Port Kells.

Following the 2022 Canadian federal electoral redistribution, the riding lost all of its territory in Langley Township to Langley Township—Fraser Heights. It also saw the area south of 64 Ave and west of 146 Street ceded to Surrey Newton, and all of its territory north of 80 Avenue to Fleetwood—Port Kells. These changes came into effect during the 2025 Canadian federal election.

== Geography ==
The riding contains all of the City of Langley, most of the Cloverdale and Sullivan areas of Surrey and a strip of adjacent territory in Langley Township.

The Liberals tend to do better in the Surrey part of the riding, and in the 2019 and 2021 elections saw their strongest showing in Sullivan. The Conservatives tend to be stronger in the Langley section of the riding (both in Langley City and Township). Their strongest showing in both elections as in the neighbourhood of Routley in Langley Township. NDP support is more evenly spread out across the riding.

== Demographics ==
Racial groups in Cloverdale—Langley City (2011−2021)
Racial group	2021		2016		2011	
Racial group	Pop.	%	Pop.	%	Pop.	%
European (Note: Statistic includes all persons that did not make up part of a visible minority or an indigenous identity.)	68,850	53.12%	75,890	64.9%	72,695	72.75%
South Asian	27,555	21.26%	16,520	14.13%	10,405	10.41%
Filipino	7,835	6.05%	4,955	4.24%	3,220	3.22%
Chinese	5,010	3.87%	3,965	3.39%	2,955	2.96%
Indigenous	4,750	3.66%	4,355	3.72%	3,385	3.39%
Black	2,785	2.15%	1,840	1.57%	990	0.99%
Korean	2,555	1.97%	2,090	1.79%	1,260	1.26%
Southeast Asian	2,500	1.93%	2,285	1.95%	2,020	2.02%
Latin American	2,230	1.72%	1,460	1.25%	940	0.94%
West Asian	1,005	0.78%	465	0.4%	265	0.27%
Arab	940	0.73%	615	0.53%	155	0.16%
Japanese	835	0.64%	970	0.83%	620	0.62%
Other (Note: Statistic includes total responses of "Visible minority, n.i.e." and "Multiple visible minorities" under visible minority section on census.)	2,760	2.13%	1,530	1.31%	1,015	1.02%
Total responses	129,610	99.19%	116,930	99.4%	99,930	99.61%
Total population	130,665	100%	117,640	100%	100,318	100%
Notes: Totals greater than 100% due to multiple origin responses. Demographics based on 2012 Canadian federal electoral redistribution riding boundaries.

According to the 2021 Canadian census; 2013 representation

Languages: 69.8% English, 10.6% Punjabi, 2.5% Tagalog, 1.6% Korean, 1.6% Mandarin, 1.5% Spanish, 1.4% Hindi, 1.1% French
Religions: 36.8% Christian (12.8% Catholic, 1.9% United Church, 1.7% Anglican, 1.4% Baptist, 1.4% Pentecostal, 17.5% Other), 14.5% Sikh, 3.2% Muslim, 3.0% Hindu, 1.3% Buddhist, 40.5% No religion
Median income (2020): $44,800
Average income (2010): $53,050

== Riding associations ==
Riding associations are the local branches of political parties:

Party	Association name	CEO	HQ city
Conservative	Cloverdale--Langley City Conservative Association	Leslie Koole	Langley
Liberal	Cloverdale--Langley City Federal Liberal Association	Mary-Em M. Waddington	Surrey
New Democratic	Cloverdale--Langley City Federal NDP Riding Association	Rajesh Jayaprakash	Surrey

== Members of Parliament ==
This riding has elected the following members of the House of Commons of Canada:

Parliament	Years	Member	Party
Cloverdale—Langley City; Riding created from Fleetwood—Port Kells, Langley and South Surrey—White Rock—Cloverdale
42nd	2015–2019	John Aldag	Liberal
43rd	2019–2021	Tamara Jansen	Conservative
44th	2021–2024	John Aldag	Liberal
44th	2024–2025	Tamara Jansen	Conservative
45th	2025–present	Tamara Jansen	Conservative

== Election results ==
View source data.
Graph of election results in Cloverdale—Langley City (minor parties that never got 2% of the vote or didn't run consistently are omitted)

=== 2023 Representation Order ===
2025 Canadian federal election
Party	Candidate	Votes	%	±%	Expenditures
Conservative	Tamara Jansen	25,607	47.78	+11.66	
Liberal	Kyle Latchford	24,838	46.35	+7.25	
New Democratic	Vanessa Sharma	2,350	4.39	–15.57	
Green	Kevin Daniel Wilkie	498	0.93	N/A	
People's	Jim McMurtry	295	0.55	–4.27	
Total valid votes/expense limit					
Total rejected ballots					
Turnout		53,588	64.66		
Eligible voters		82,873			
Conservative notional gain from Liberal		Swing		+2.21	
Source: Elections Canada
Note: Change in percentage value and swing are calculated from the redistributed results of the 2021 general election, not the December 2024 by-election.

2021 federal election redistributed results
Party	Vote	%
Liberal	18,711	39.10
Conservative	17,284	36.12
New Democratic	9,549	19.96
People's	2,307	4.82

=== 2013 Representation Order ===
Canadian federal by-election, December 16, 2024 Resignation of John Aldag
Party	Candidate	Votes	%	±%
Conservative	Tamara Jansen	9,936	66.23	+30.13
Liberal	Madison Fleischer	2,411	16.07	-23.13
New Democratic	Vanessa Sharma	1,879	12.52	-7.36
Green	Patrick McCutcheon	580	3.87	—
People's	Ian Kennedy	134	0.89	-3.92
Libertarian	Alex Joehl	62	0.41	—
Total valid votes		15,002		
Total rejected ballots		28	0.19	-0.76
Turnout		15,030	16.33	-44.52
Eligible voters		92,061		
Conservative gain from Liberal		Swing		+26.63
Source: Elections Canada

2021 Canadian federal election
Party	Candidate	Votes	%	±%	Expenditures
Liberal	John Aldag	20,877	39.21	+3.99	$111,123.12
Conservative	Tamara Jansen	19,223	36.10	-1.63	$85,561.60
New Democratic	Rajesh Jayaprakash	10,587	19.88	+0.94	$13,177.92
People's	Ian Kennedy	2,563	4.81	+3.14	$0.00
Total valid votes/expense limit		53,250	99.06	–	$116,950.48
Total rejected ballots		508	0.94	+0.20	
Turnout		53,758	60.85	-3.70	
Eligible voters		88,348			
Liberal gain from Conservative		Swing		+2.81	
Source: Elections Canada

2019 Canadian federal election
Party	Candidate	Votes	%	±%	Expenditures
Conservative	Tamara Jansen	20,936	37.73	+2.96	$70,620.42
Liberal	John Aldag	19,542	35.22	-10.31	$105,884.21
New Democratic	Rae Banwarie	10,508	18.94	+3.29	$15,133
Green	Caelum Nutbrown	3,572	6.44	+2.38	none listed
People's	Ian Kennedy	930	1.68	-	$464
Total valid votes/expense limit		55,488	99.26		
Total rejected ballots		415	0.74	+0.40	
Turnout		55,903	64.55	-4.85	
Eligible voters		86,610			
Conservative gain from Liberal		Swing		+6.63	
Source: Elections Canada

2015 Canadian federal election
Party	Candidate	Votes	%	±%	Expenditures
Liberal	John Aldag	24,617	45.52	+33.72	$48,139.65
Conservative	Dean Drysdale	18,800	34.77	-22.60	$164,422.49
New Democratic	Rebecca Smith	8,463	15.65	-9.02	$12,325.60
Green	Scott Anderson	2,195	4.06	-0.56	$5,846.04
Total valid votes/expense limit		54,075	99.66		$209,882.99
Total rejected ballots		186	0.34	–	
Turnout		54,261	69.40	–	
Eligible voters		78,189			
Liberal gain from Conservative		Swing		+28.16	
Source: Elections Canada

2011 federal election redistributed results
Party	Vote	%
Conservative	21,595	57.37
New Democratic	9,289	24.68
Liberal	4,442	11.80
Green	1,735	4.61
Other	578	1.54

== See also ==
- List of Canadian electoral districts
- Historical federal electoral districts of Canada
