= Gudie Hutchings =

Canadian politician (born 1959)

The Honourable Gudie Hutchings PC
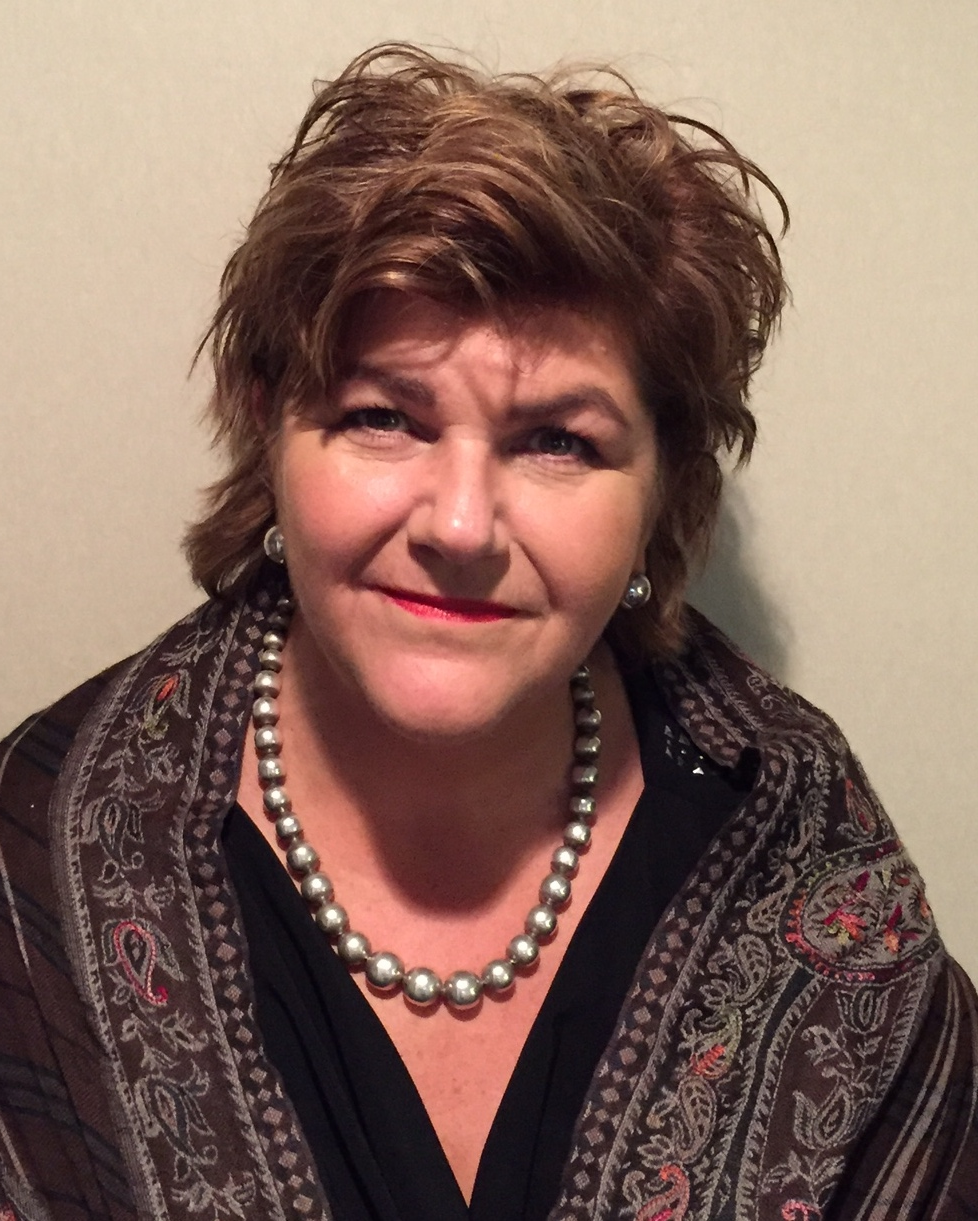
- Hutchings in 2016

Minister of Rural Economic Development
- In office October 26, 2021 – March 14, 2025
- Prime Minister: Justin Trudeau
- Preceded by: Maryam Monsef
- Succeeded by: Kody Blois

Minister responsible for the Atlantic Canada Opportunities Agency
- In office July 26, 2023 – March 14, 2025
- Prime Minister: Justin Trudeau
- Preceded by: Ginette Petitpas Taylor
- Succeeded by: Position abolished

Member of Parliament for Long Range Mountains
- In office October 19, 2015 – March 23, 2025
- Preceded by: Riding established
- Succeeded by: Carol Anstey

Personal details
- Born: Gudrid Ida Lundrigan; September 1, 1959 (age 66) Corner Brook, Newfoundland and Labrador
- Party: Liberal
- Spouse: Joseph Hutchings (divorced)
- Profession: Businesswoman

Gudrid Ida "Gudie" Hutchings PC (née Lundrigan; September 1, 1959) is a Canadian politician who represented Long Range Mountains in the House of Commons from 2015 to 2025. A member of the Liberal Party, Hutchings served as Minister of Rural Economic Development from 2021 to 2025 and Minister responsible for the Atlantic Canada Opportunities Agency from 2023 to 2025.

== Background ==
Hutchings was born on September 1, 1959, in Corner Brook to Arthur Lundrigan and Ida Lundrigan (née Johnson); she grew up in the Humber Valley. She attended Acadia University.

Prior to her election, Hutchings was a local businessperson with a nearly three-decade career, primarily in the tourism and outfitting industries. She owned fly fishing lodges in Labrador, spent more than ten years on the board of the Newfoundland and Labrador Outfitters Association (rising to the position of president), and served on the inaugural national board of the Canadian Federation of Outfitting Associations. She is also a former president of the Corner Brook Chamber of Commerce. At the time of her election, Hutchings was also the chair of the Battle Harbour Historic Trust. She volunteered for over 15 years with Girl Guides of Canada as a Brownie, Guide, Pathfinder, and Ranger Leader; further, Hutchings was a girl member during her childhood, calling it a "huge part of her growing up".

== Political career ==
Gerry Byrne, who held the riding of Humber—St. Barbe—Baie Verte for the Liberal Party since 1996, decided not to run in the 2015 federal election in June 2014; instead, he opted to run in the 2015 provincial election. Hutchings, endorsed by Byrne, decided to run for the nomination in November 2014. She secured the nomination in March 2015 to run as the Liberal candidate in the riding of Long Range Mountains.

Hutchings was elected in the federal election, and on December 2, 2015, she was named the parliamentary secretary to the minister of small business and tourism. On November 6, 2017, Hutchings was appointed to the National Security and Intelligence Committee of Parliamentarians.

Hutchings was re-elected in the 2019 federal election, and on December 12, 2019, was appointed as the parliamentary secretary to the minister for women and gender equality and rural economic development, Maryam Monsef.

Following the 2021 federal election, Hutchings was re-elected; however, Monsef lost her seat. Prime Minister Justin Trudeau assigned Hutchings the Rural Economic Development portfolio. Following a major Cabinet shuffle on July 26, 2023, Hutchings was assigned the additional portfolio of Minister responsible for the Atlantic Canada Opportunities Agency.

On January 9, 2025, Hutchings announced that she would not be seeking re-election in the 2025 Canadian federal election.

== Electoral record ==
2021 Canadian federal election: Long Range Mountains
Party	Candidate	Votes	%	±%	Expenditures
Liberal	Gudie Hutchings	16,178	44.39	-2.97	$92,705.20
Conservative	Carol Anstey	14,344	39.36	+11.06	$56,261.52
New Democratic	Kaila Mintz	4,347	11.93	-7.87	$6,169.08
People's	Darrell Shelley	1,578	4.33	–	none listed
Total valid votes/expense limit		36,447	98.75		$125,696.31
Total rejected ballots		461	1.25	-0.23	
Turnout		36,908	52.57	-2.61	
Registered voters		70,208			
Liberal hold		Swing		-7.02	
Source: Elections Canada

2019 Canadian federal election: Long Range Mountains
Party	Candidate	Votes	%	±%	Expenditures
Liberal	Gudie Hutchings	18,199	47.36	-26.49	$67,837.53
Conservative	Josh Eisses	10,873	28.30	+16.14	none listed
New Democratic	Holly Pike	7,609	19.80	+8.47	$43.82
Green	Lucas Knill	1,334	3.47	+0.81	$533.12
Veterans Coalition	Robert Miles	411	1.06	–	none listed
Total valid votes/expense limit		38,426	98.52	-1.22	122,089.44
Total rejected ballots		576	1.48	+1.22	
Turnout		39,002	56.21	-2.82	
Eligible voters		69,385			
Liberal hold		Swing		-26.49	
Source: Elections Canada

2015 Canadian federal election: Long Range Mountains
Party	Candidate	Votes	%	±%	Expenditures
Liberal	Gudie Hutchings	30,889	73.85	+18.70	$37,729.67
Conservative	Wayne Ruth	5,085	12.16	–13.09	$21,208.61
New Democratic	Devon Babstock	4,739	11.33	–6.51	$8,554.67
Green	Terry Cormier	1,111	2.66	+1.62	$2,064.79
Total valid votes/expense limit		41,824	100.00		$242,285.48
Total rejected ballots		108	0.26	–	
Turnout		41,932	59.03	–	
Eligible voters		71,037			
Liberal hold		Swing		+15.90	
Source: Elections Canada

2011 federal election redistributed results
Party	Vote	%
Liberal	19,770	55.16
Conservative	9,051	25.25
New Democratic	6,394	17.84
Green	370	1.03
Independent	258	0.72
