= Pam Damoff =

Canadian politician

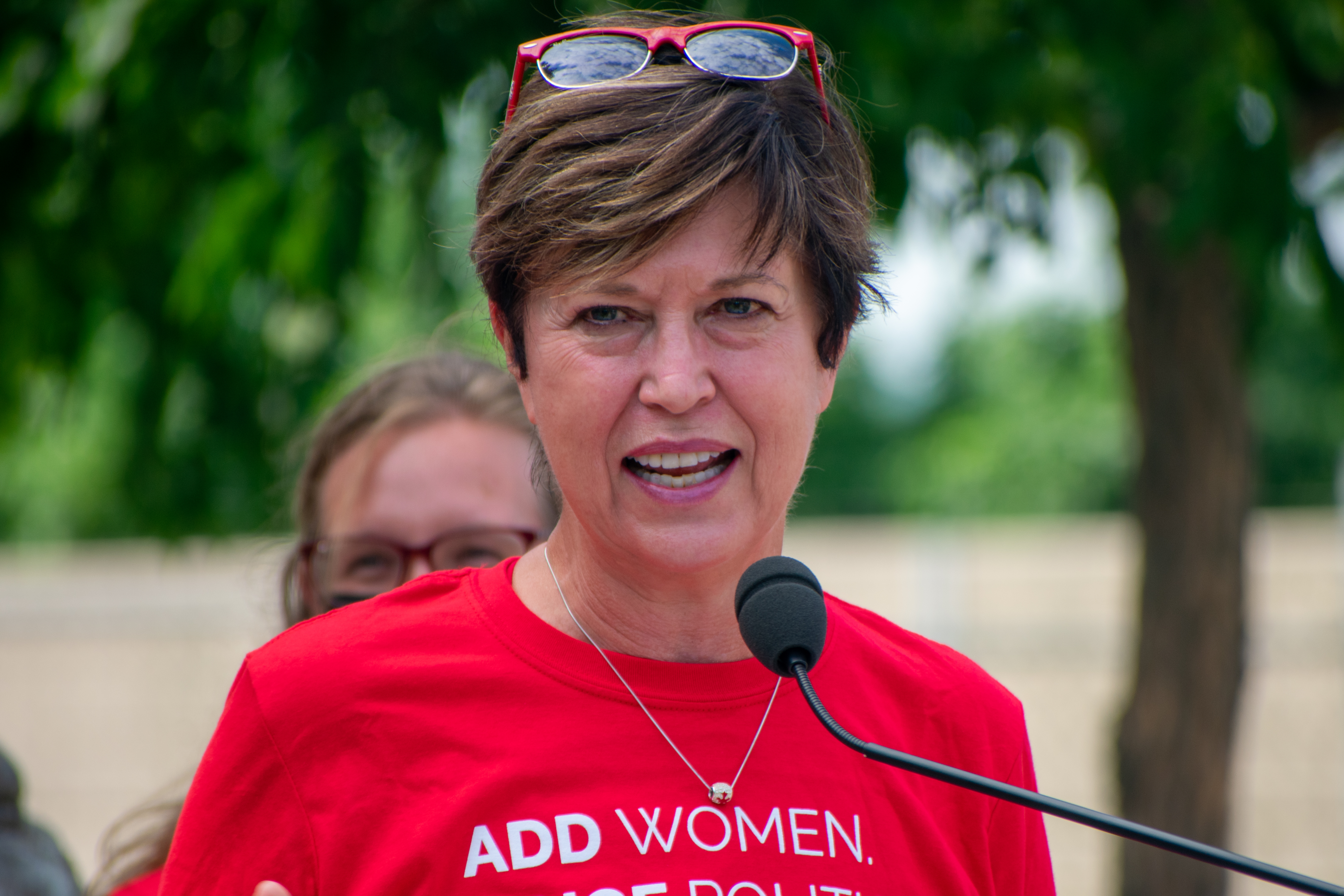

Member of Parliament for Oakville North—Burlington
- In office October 19, 2015 – March 23, 2025
- Preceded by: Constituency established
- Succeeded by: Constituency dissolved

Parliamentary Secretary to the Minister of Public Safety
- In office October 26, 2021 – March 23, 2025
- Minister: Dominic LeBlanc

Oakville Town Councillor
- In office December 1, 2010 – October 26, 2015
- Preceded by: Cathy Duddeck
- Succeeded by: Ray Chisholm
- Constituency: Ward 2

Personal details
- Born: Pamela Damoff; March 13, 1971 (age 55) London, Ontario, Canada
- Party: Liberal
- Education: University of Western Ontario (BA)

Pamela Damoff (born March 13, 1971) is a Canadian politician, who represented the riding of Oakville North—Burlington in the House of Commons of Canada from 2015 to 2025 as a member of the Liberal Party. She represented Ward 2 on the Oakville Town Council from 2010 to 2015.

== Personal history ==
Born in London, Ontario, her father was vice-president of a manufacturing company and her mother was a homemaker. Damoff attended the University of Western Ontario, graduating with a Bachelor of Arts degree in 1980. She spent 27 years working in financial and investment banking positions and the last 11 years as a self-employed consultant, while she focused on the community. Damoff has lived in Oakville since 1992.

== Career ==
Damoff was elected to the Oakville Town Council representing Ward 2 in 2010, and re-elected in 2014. During her time on council, she served on the Oakville Public Library Board, the budget committee and the Oakville Tourism Partnership. She was recognized as an advocate for active transportation and better cycling infrastructure in Oakville. Damoff is the chair of Oakville's Terry Fox Run and was the chair of the Oakville Santa Claus Parade.

=== Parliament ===
Oakville Ward 6 councillor Max Khan was the initial Liberal Party candidate for Oakville North—Burlington in the 2015 federal election, but he died suddenly in March 2015, leaving a need to nominate a new candidate. Damoff announced her candidacy for the nomination on April 29, 2015, with the support of Khan's father. She subsequently secured the nomination, and narrowly won the general election by 3.41% of the vote.

Damoff was named vice-chair of the Standing Committee on the Status of Women in December 2015. In April 2019, she fainted at her desk in the House of Commons during question period.

She was re-elected in the 2019 federal election, defeating Conservative candidate Sean Weir by a margin of 10.22% or 7113 votes. Shortly after, she was appointed Parliamentary Secretary to the Minister of Indigenous Services, Marc Miller. Damoff was elected to a third term in the 2021 federal election, where she defeated Conservative candidate Hanan Rizkalla by a margin of 8.8% or 5891 votes, with New Democratic candidate Lenaee Dupuis coming in third with 6574 votes.

On May 1, 2024, Damoff announced that she would not seek re-election in the upcoming 2025 Canadian federal election, citing fears for her safety and disgust with toxicity in politics. On January 14, 2025, she endorsed Burlington MP Karina Gould in the 2025 Liberal Party of Canada leadership election.

=== Post-politics ===
Following her exit from politics, it was announced that she would be Chief Executive Officer of Pearson Centre.

== Electoral record ==
2021 Canadian federal election
Party	Candidate	Votes	%	±%	Expenditures
Liberal	Pam Damoff	30,910	46.8	–1.5	$71,960.98
Conservative	Hanan Rizkalla	25,091	38.0	±0.0	$81,816.65
New Democratic	Lenaee Dupuis	6,574	10.0	+1.6	$9,944.56
People's	Gilbert Jubinville	2,429	3.7	+2.6	$9,465.38
Green	Bruno Sousa	1,019	1.5	–2.7	$2,312.56
Total valid votes/Expense limit		66,023	99.2	–	$126,208.50
Total rejected ballots		533	0.8		
Turnout		66,556	66.9		
Eligible voters		99,493			
Liberal hold		Swing		-0.8	
Source: Elections Canada

2019 Canadian federal election: Oakville North—Burlington
Party	Candidate	Votes	%	±%	Expenditures
Liberal	Pam Damoff	33,597	48.26	+1.52	$113,366.12
Conservative	Sean Weir	26,484	38.04	−5.29	$111,573.20
New Democratic	Nicolas Dion	5,866	8.43	+1.18	none listed
Green	Michael Houghton	2,925	4.20	+2.61	$332.94
People's	Gilbert Joseph Jubinville	751	1.08		none listed
Total valid votes/expense limit		69,623	99.41		
Total rejected ballots		412	0.59	+0.14	
Turnout		70,035	71.69	+0.45	
Eligible voters		97,696			
Liberal hold		Swing		+3.40	
Source: Elections Canada

2015 Canadian federal election: Oakville North—Burlington
Party	Candidate	Votes	%	±%	Expenditures
Liberal	Pam Damoff	28,415	46.74	+19.77	$87,266.36
Conservative	Effie Triantafilopoulos	26,342	43.33	–10.83	$133,882.22
New Democratic	Janice Best	4,405	7.25	–8.26	$10,112.38
Green	Adnan Shahbaz	968	1.59	–1.51	$2,273.28
Libertarian	David Clement	666	1.10	–	$3,998.74
Total valid votes/expense limit		60,796	99.55		$223,412.78
Total rejected ballots		272	0.45	–	
Turnout		61,068	71.24	–	
Eligible voters		85,727			
Liberal notional gain from Conservative		Swing		+15.30	
Source: Elections Canada
