= Tamara Jansen =

Canadian politician (born 1967 or 1968)

Tamara Jansen MP
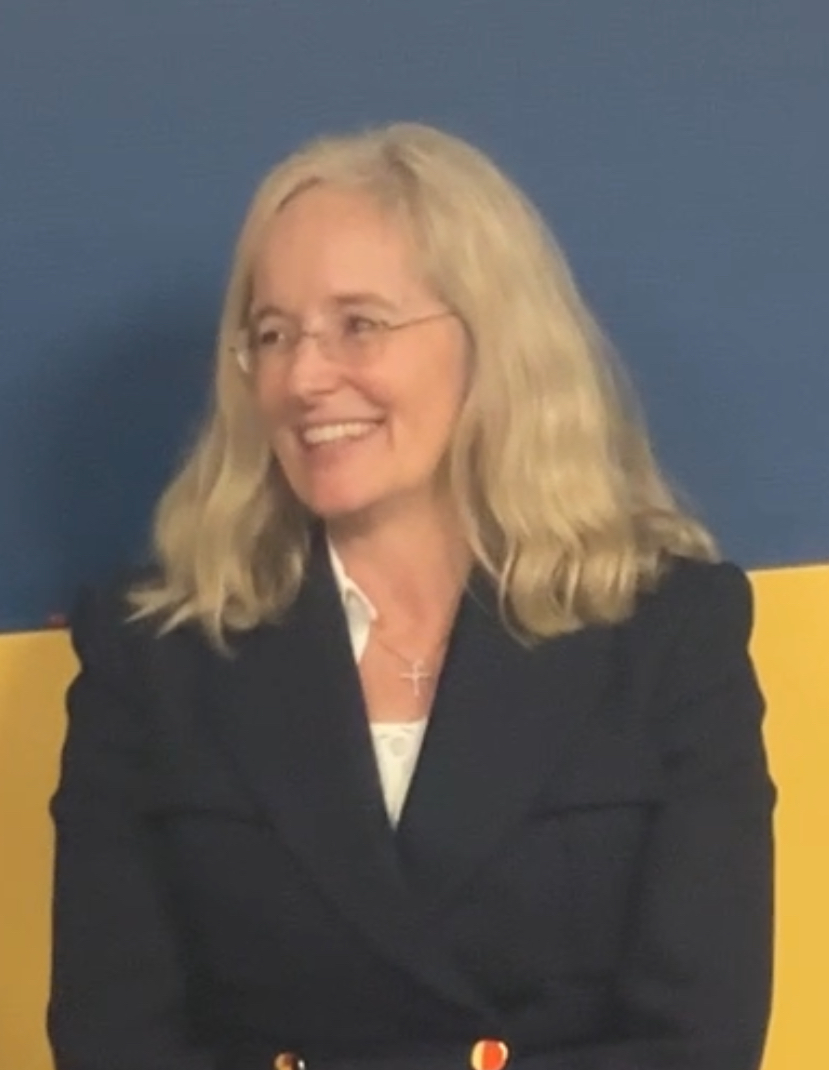
- Jansen in 2024

Member of Parliament for Cloverdale—Langley City
- Incumbent
- Assumed office December 16, 2024
- Preceded by: John Aldag
- In office October 21, 2019 – September 20, 2021
- Preceded by: John Aldag
- Succeeded by: John Aldag

Personal details
- Born: 1967 or 1968 (age 57–58) Cloverdale, British Columbia, Canada
- Party: Conservative
- Spouse: Byron Jansen
- Children: 5

Tamara N. Jansen MP (born 1967 or 1968) is a Canadian politician and businesswoman who has served as the member of Parliament (MP) for Cloverdale—Langley City since winning re-election in the 2024 by-election. A member of the Conservative Party of Canada, she previously held this seat from 2019 to 2021 before losing re-election to John Aldag.

== Life and early career ==
Jansen was born and raised in Cloverdale, British Columbia. She attended William of Orange Christian School. Prior to entering politics, Jansen owned and operated Darvonda Nurseries, a large plant nursery in Langley, British Columbia, alongside her husband and family. The family-run business established her reputation as a prominent figure in the local business community. She retired from the business and sold it to her son prior to pursuing her political career. She has an extended family that lives in the United States. Jansen has 23 grandchildren, one of whom is named after assassinated American political activist Charlie Kirk.

In addition to her business ventures, Jansen has been involved in organizing significant events within the Conservative Party. In February 2017, she hosted and helped organize a Conservative Party leadership debate at Darvonda Nurseries, which drew over 500 attendees and included 12 candidates. Jansen has also been an active member of the Association for Reformed Political Action (ARPA), a national Christian organization, where she lobbied against the implementation of medical assistance in dying (MAID). In May 2018, she hosted a pro-pipeline rally at her home, one of five held in British Columbia that day, where she criticized opposition to the Trans Mountain Pipeline expansion as "nonsensical."

== Political career ==
=== 43rd Parliament (2019–2021) ===
Jansen was first elected in the 2019 Canadian federal election, held on October 21, 2019. She unseated Liberal incumbent John Aldag by a margin of 1,302 votes to secure the riding of Cloverdale—Langley City.

During the 43rd Parliament, Jansen served on the Finance, Health, and COVID-19 pandemic committees, where she was active in parliamentary proceedings. Notably, she contributed to discussions on federal fiscal policy in the Finance Committee and advocated for transparent pandemic response measures during her time on the COVID-19 Pandemic Committee. Over her tenure, she logged 763 interventions in committees and 159 interventions in the House of Commons.

On November 29, 2019, Jansen joined the Conservative Party’s outer shadow cabinet as the deputy shadow minister of Labour under Andrew Scheer.

In the 2020 Conservative Party leadership race, Jansen endorsed Leslyn Lewis.

In the 2021 federal election, Jansen was defeated by former MP John Aldag, who regained the Cloverdale—Langley City seat for the Liberal Party.

=== 44th Parliament (2024–2025) ===
Following Aldag’s resignation to pursue other opportunities, Jansen ran again in a December 2024 by-election for the riding of Cloverdale—Langley City. She won decisively with 66.3% of the vote, defeating Liberal candidate Madison Fleischer and flipping the seat back to the Conservative Party.

Her victory came amid low voter turnout, with only 16.3% of registered voters casting ballots. Jansen celebrated with supporters at her campaign office but declined interviews with local media following the win. Fellow Conservative MP Tako van Popta called her “a good addition to caucus.”

During the campaign, Jansen focused on grassroots engagement, hosting events like pancake breakfasts and door-knocking efforts. However, she notably did not attend an all-candidates meeting organized by the Cloverdale District Chamber of Commerce and Surrey Board of Trade, a decision that drew some attention.

In September 2025, CBC News reported that international students at Pacific Link College in British Columbia alleged they were required to volunteer for Jansen’s 2024 by-election campaign as part of a course. The college denied the allegations, stating participation was voluntary, while Jansen said she had no connection to the school and was unaware of the situation.

=== 45th Parliament (2025–present) ===
Jansen held her seat in the 2025 Canadian federal election.

At the time of the 2025 Canadian federal election, she lived in Langley.

== Political positions ==
=== Pro-life and family advocacy ===
Jansen is known for her strong anti-abortion and pro-traditional family stance. In June 2021, she voted in favour of Bill C-233, introduced by Conservative MP Cathay Wagantall, which sought to ban the practice of sex-selective abortion. Additionally, she voted against Bill C-6, legislation proposed by the Trudeau government that would criminalize certain forms of conversion therapy and parental control regarding gender identity. Jansen claimed that the bill threatened parental rights and religious freedoms.

In a 2019 questionnaire, Jansen affirmed her belief that life begins at conception and pledged to support laws protecting fetuses from that point onward. She also committed to opposing laws that expand euthanasia and assisted suicide.

During the 2020 Conservative Party leadership race, Jansen endorsed Leslyn Lewis, an anti-abortion and pro-traditional family candidate, further solidifying her alignment with social conservative values.

=== Bill C-6 issues ===
Jansen faced controversy in April 2021 during a debate on Bill C-6, An Act to amend the Criminal Code (conversion therapy). During a debate on Bill C-6, Jansen referenced a Bible passage that included the word "unclean." The remark was criticized by some as being directed toward LGBTQ+ individuals; however, Jansen clarified that her intent was to address hypocrisy, not to single out any particular group, and she expressed regret for any misunderstanding.

On June 22, 2021, Jansen voted against Bill C-6. She explained her opposition by expressing concerns that the bill did not adequately protect "counsel from religious leaders on sexuality" and the "rights of parents to protect and guide their children."

=== Medical assistance in dying (MAID) ===
Jansen has been a vocal opponent of medical assistance in dying. She participated in protests against MAID in 2016 and served as master of ceremonies at public forums advocating against the implementation of MAID in hospices. She described the discussions surrounding MAID as "respectful conversations" and has continued to raise concerns about the impact of such policies on Canadian healthcare.

== Electoral record ==
2025 Canadian federal election: Cloverdale—Langley City
Party	Candidate	Votes	%	±%	Expenditures
Conservative	Tamara Jansen	25,607	47.78	+11.66	
Liberal	Kyle Latchford	24,838	46.35	+7.25	
New Democratic	Vanessa Sharma	2,350	4.39	–15.57	
Green	Kevin Daniel Wilkie	498	0.93	N/A	
People's	Jim McMurtry	295	0.55	–4.27	
Total valid votes/expense limit					
Total rejected ballots					
Turnout		53,588	64.66		
Eligible voters		82,873			
Conservative notional gain from Liberal		Swing		+2.21	
Source: Elections Canada
Note: Change in percentage value and swing are calculated from the redistributed results of the 2021 general election, not the December 2024 by-election.

Canadian federal by-election, December 16, 2024: Cloverdale—Langley City Resignation of John Aldag
Party	Candidate	Votes	%	±%
Conservative	Tamara Jansen	9,936	66.23	+30.13
Liberal	Madison Fleischer	2,411	16.07	-23.13
New Democratic	Vanessa Sharma	1,879	12.52	-7.36
Green	Patrick McCutcheon	580	3.87	—
People's	Ian Kennedy	134	0.89	-3.92
Libertarian	Alex Joehl	62	0.41	—
Total valid votes		15,002		
Total rejected ballots		28	0.19	-0.76
Turnout		15,030	16.33	-44.52
Eligible voters		92,061		
Conservative gain from Liberal		Swing		+26.63
Source: Elections Canada

2021 Canadian federal election: Cloverdale—Langley City
Party	Candidate	Votes	%	±%	Expenditures
Liberal	John Aldag	20,877	39.21	+3.99	$111,123.12
Conservative	Tamara Jansen	19,223	36.10	-1.63	$85,561.60
New Democratic	Rajesh Jayaprakash	10,587	19.88	+0.94	$13,177.92
People's	Ian Kennedy	2,563	4.81	+3.14	$0.00
Total valid votes/expense limit		53,250	99.06	–	$116,950.48
Total rejected ballots		508	0.94	+0.20	
Turnout		53,758	60.85	-3.70	
Eligible voters		88,348			
Liberal gain from Conservative		Swing		+2.81	
Source: Elections Canada

2019 Canadian federal election: Cloverdale—Langley City
Party	Candidate	Votes	%	±%	Expenditures
Conservative	Tamara Jansen	20,936	37.73	+2.96	$70,620.42
Liberal	John Aldag	19,542	35.22	-10.31	$105,884.21
New Democratic	Rae Banwarie	10,508	18.94	+3.29	$15,133
Green	Caelum Nutbrown	3,572	6.44	+2.38	none listed
People's	Ian Kennedy	930	1.68	-	$464
Total valid votes/expense limit		55,488	99.26		
Total rejected ballots		415	0.74	+0.40	
Turnout		55,903	64.55	-4.85	
Eligible voters		86,610			
Conservative gain from Liberal		Swing		+6.63	
Source: Elections Canada
