= Sherry Romanado =

Canadian politician (born 1974)

Sherry Romanado MP

Deputy Leader of the Government in the House of Commons
- In office December 3, 2021 – September 15, 2023
- Leader: Mark Holland; Karina Gould
- Preceded by: Kirsty Duncan
- Succeeded by: Mark Gerretsen

Member of Parliament for Longueuil—Charles-LeMoyne
- Incumbent
- Assumed office October 19, 2015
- Preceded by: district created

Parliamentary Secretary to the Minister of National Defence
- Incumbent
- Assumed office June 5, 2025

Parliamentary Secretary to the Minister of Seniors
- In office August 31, 2018 – September 11, 2019
- Minister: Filomena Tassi
- Preceded by: position created
- Succeeded by: Stéphane Lauzon

Parliamentary Secretary to the Minister of Veterans Affairs and Associate Minister of National Defence
- In office January 30, 2017 – August 30, 2018
- Minister: Kent Hehr
- Preceded by: Karen McCrimmon
- Succeeded by: Stéphane Lauzon

Personal details
- Born: April 12, 1974 (age 52) Greenfield Park, Quebec, Canada
- Party: Liberal

Sherry Romanado MP (born April 12, 1974) is a Canadian politician, school administrator, and public relations officer who has represented the riding of Longueuil—Charles-LeMoyne in the House of Commons of Canada since 2015.

Romanado was first elected to the House of Commons in the 2015 Canadian federal election. On January 30, 2017, she was named Parliamentary Secretary to the Minister of Veterans Affairs and Associate Minister of National Defence, which she held until August 30, 2018. On August 31, 2018 she was named Parliamentary Secretary to the Minister of Seniors, which she held for the remainder of the 42nd Parliament. After her re-election in the 2019 federal election, Romanado was appointed chair of the Industry, Science and Technology committee.

After being re-elected in the 2021 federal election, Romanado was appointed Deputy Leader of the Government in the House of Commons.

== Electoral record ==
2025 Canadian federal election: Longueuil—Charles-LeMoyne
Party	Candidate	Votes	%	±%	Expenditures
Liberal	Sherry Romanado	25,138	49.39	+8.95	$61,946.05
Bloc Québécois	Beritan Oerde	13,583	26.69	-8.59	$15,654.49
Conservative	Terry Roberts	8,547	16.79	+8.48	$207.81
New Democratic	Marie-Andrée Gravel	2,832	5.56	-4.77	$0.00
People's	Tiny Olinga	411	0.81	-2.13	$0.00
Rhinoceros	Donald Gagnon	389	0.76	N/A	$0.00
Total valid votes/expense limit		50,900	98.01	–	$128,720.23
Total rejected ballots		1,031	1.99		
Turnout		51,931	63.56		
Eligible voters		81,699			
Liberal hold		Swing		+8.77	
Source: Elections Canada
Note: number of eligible voters does not include voting day registrations.

2021 Canadian federal election: Longueuil—Charles-LeMoyne
Party	Candidate	Votes	%	±%	Expenditures
Liberal	Sherry Romanado	19,400	40.44	+1.42	$40,412.09
Bloc Québécois	Nathalie Boisclair	16,926	35.28	-1.18	$36,719.22
New Democratic	Kalden Dhatsenpa	4,957	10.33	+0.07	$0.39
Conservative	Isabelle Lalonde	3,986	8.31	+0.92	$0.00
People's	Tiny Olinga	1,409	2.94	+1.86	$0.00
Green	Nancy Cardin	1,170	2.44	-3.34	$0.00
Marxist–Leninist	Pierre Chénier	122	0.25	–	$0.00
Total valid votes/expense limit		47,970	97.66	–	$112,170.99
Total rejected ballots		1,150	2.34	–	
Turnout		49,120	59.80	-3.04	
Registered voters		82,139			
Liberal hold		Swing		+1.30	
Source: Elections Canada

2019 Canadian federal election: Longueuil—Charles-LeMoyne
Party	Candidate	Votes	%	±%	Expenditures
Liberal	Sherry Romanado	20,114	39.02	+3.61	$51,937.26
Bloc Québécois	Cathy Lepage	18,794	36.46	+9.47	$20,300.47
New Democratic	Kalden Dhatsenpa	5,289	10.26	-13.81	$190.90
Conservative	Stéphane Robichaud	3,811	7.39	-2.19	$16,567.22
Green	Casandra Poitras	2,978	5.78	+2.88	none listed
People's	Henri Cousineau	558	1.08	–	none listed
Total valid votes/expense limit		51,544	–	–	
Total rejected ballots		1,067			
Turnout		52,611	62.8		
Eligible voters		83,717			
Liberal hold		Swing		-2.93	
Source: Elections Canada

2015 Canadian federal election
Party	Candidate	Votes	%	±%	Expenditures
Liberal	Sherry Romanado	18,301	35.39	+22.07	–
Bloc Québécois	Philippe Cloutier	13,974	27.03	-1.27	–
New Democratic	Sadia Groguhé	12,468	24.11	-21.32	–
Conservative	Thomas Barré	4,961	9.59	-0.94	–
Green	Mario Leclerc	1,510	2.92	+0.51	–
Rhinoceros	Matthew Iakov Liberman	325	0.63	–	–
Marxist–Leninist	Pierre Chénier	168	0.32	–	–
Total valid votes/Expense limit		51,707	100.00		$220,839.26
Total rejected ballots		925	1.76	–	
Turnout		52,632	62.87	–	
Eligible voters		83,719			
Liberal gain from New Democratic		Swing		+21.70	
Source: Elections Canada
