= Longueuil—Charles-LeMoyne—Greenfield Park =

Federal electoral district in Quebec, Canada

Coordinates: 45°32′30″N 73°26′30″W

Longueuil—Charles-LeMoyne
Quebec electoral district
- Interactive map of riding boundaries from the 2015 federal election

Federal electoral district
- Legislature: House of Commons
MP
Sherry Romanado
Liberal
- District created: 2013
- First contested: 2015
- Last contested: 2025
- District webpage: profile, map

Demographics
- Population (2021): 112,257
- Electors (2025): 81,699
- Area (km²): 39
- Pop. density (per km²): 2,878.4
- Census division: Longueuil

Longueuil—Charles-LeMoyne—Greenfield Park, formerly Longueuil—Charles-LeMoyne (French pronunciation: [lɔ̃ɡœj ʃaʁl ləmwan]) is a federal electoral district in Quebec, Canada, that has been represented in the House of Commons of Canada since 2015.

== Profile ==
Despite breaking for the NDP in 2011, Longueuil—Charles-LeMoyne has become more of a competition between the Liberals and the Bloc Québécois, with the Liberals performing better in more Anglophone areas, such as Greenfield Park.

== Demographics ==
According to the 2016 Canadian census

- Twenty most common mother tongue languages (2016) : 73.8% French, 8.9% English, 3.7% Spanish, 2.5% Arabic, 1.4% Creole languages, 1.1% Persian, 1.0% Romanian, 0.8% Mandarin, 0.7% Portuguese, 0.6% Russian, 0.5% Cantonese, 0.5% Italian, 0.4% Vietnamese, 0.3% Greek, 0.2% Kabyle, 0.2% Bulgarian, 0.2% Lao, 0.2% Polish, 0.2% Wolof, 0.2% Tagalog

== History ==
Longueuil—Charles-LeMoyne was created by the 2012 federal electoral boundaries redistribution out of parts of Saint-Bruno—Saint-Hubert and Saint-Lambert, and was legally defined in the 2013 representation order. It came into effect upon the call of the 2015 Canadian federal election. The riding was originally intended to be named LeMoyne.

The riding's name was changed to Longueuil—Charles-LeMoyne—Greenfield Park as part of Bill C-25 of the 45th Canadian Parliament.

=== Members of Parliament ===
This riding has elected the following members of Parliament:

Parliament	Years	Member	Party
Longueuil—Charles-LeMoyne; Riding created from Saint-Bruno—Saint-Hubert and Saint-Lambert
42nd	2015–2019	Sherry Romanado	Liberal
43rd	2019–2021	Sherry Romanado	Liberal
44th	2021–2025	Sherry Romanado	Liberal
45th	2025–present	Sherry Romanado	Liberal

== Election results ==
2025 Canadian federal election: Longueuil—Charles-LeMoyne
Party	Candidate	Votes	%	±%	Expenditures
Liberal	Sherry Romanado	25,138	49.39	+8.95	$61,946.05
Bloc Québécois	Beritan Oerde	13,583	26.69	-8.59	$15,654.49
Conservative	Terry Roberts	8,547	16.79	+8.48	$207.81
New Democratic	Marie-Andrée Gravel	2,832	5.56	-4.77	$0.00
People's	Tiny Olinga	411	0.81	-2.13	$0.00
Rhinoceros	Donald Gagnon	389	0.76	N/A	$0.00
Total valid votes/expense limit		50,900	98.01	–	$128,720.23
Total rejected ballots		1,031	1.99		
Turnout		51,931	63.56		
Eligible voters		81,699			
Liberal hold		Swing		+8.77	
Source: Elections Canada
Note: number of eligible voters does not include voting day registrations.

2021 Canadian federal election: Longueuil—Charles-LeMoyne
Party	Candidate	Votes	%	±%	Expenditures
Liberal	Sherry Romanado	19,400	40.44	+1.42	$40,412.09
Bloc Québécois	Nathalie Boisclair	16,926	35.28	-1.18	$36,719.22
New Democratic	Kalden Dhatsenpa	4,957	10.33	+0.07	$0.39
Conservative	Isabelle Lalonde	3,986	8.31	+0.92	$0.00
People's	Tiny Olinga	1,409	2.94	+1.86	$0.00
Green	Nancy Cardin	1,170	2.44	-3.34	$0.00
Marxist–Leninist	Pierre Chénier	122	0.25	–	$0.00
Total valid votes/expense limit		47,970	97.66	–	$112,170.99
Total rejected ballots		1,150	2.34	–	
Turnout		49,120	59.80	-3.04	
Registered voters		82,139			
Liberal hold		Swing		+1.30	
Source: Elections Canada

2019 Canadian federal election: Longueuil—Charles-LeMoyne
Party	Candidate	Votes	%	±%	Expenditures
Liberal	Sherry Romanado	20,114	39.02	+3.61	$51,937.26
Bloc Québécois	Cathy Lepage	18,794	36.46	+9.47	$20,300.47
New Democratic	Kalden Dhatsenpa	5,289	10.26	-13.81	$190.90
Conservative	Stéphane Robichaud	3,811	7.39	-2.19	$16,567.22
Green	Casandra Poitras	2,978	5.78	+2.88	none listed
People's	Henri Cousineau	558	1.08	–	none listed
Total valid votes/expense limit		51,544	–	–	
Total rejected ballots		1,067			
Turnout		52,611	62.8		
Eligible voters		83,717			
Liberal hold		Swing		-2.93	
Source: Elections Canada

2015 Canadian federal election
Party	Candidate	Votes	%	±%	Expenditures
Liberal	Sherry Romanado	18,301	35.39	+22.07	$26,644.67
Bloc Québécois	Philippe Cloutier	13,974	27.03	-1.27	$54,305.34
New Democratic	Sadia Groguhé	12,468	24.11	-21.32	–
Conservative	Thomas Barré	4,961	9.59	-0.94	–
Green	Mario Leclerc	1,510	2.92	+0.51	$6,229.28
Rhinoceros	Matthew Iakov Liberman	325	0.63	–	–
Marxist–Leninist	Pierre Chénier	168	0.32	–	–
Total valid votes/Expense limit		51,707	100.00		$220,839.26
Total rejected ballots		925	1.76	–	
Turnout		52,632	62.87	–	
Eligible voters		83,719			
Liberal gain from New Democratic		Swing		+21.70	
Source: Elections Canada

2011 federal election redistributed results
Party	Vote	%
New Democratic	21,545	45.44
Bloc Québécois	13,418	28.30
Liberal	6,318	13.32
Conservative	4,997	10.54
Green	1,141	2.41

== See also ==
- List of Canadian electoral districts
- Historical federal electoral districts of Canada
