= Oakville North—Burlington (federal electoral district) =

Defunct federal electoral district in Ontario, Canada

Coordinates: 43.414°N 79.784°W

Ontario electoral district
- Oakville North—Burlington in relation to nearby electoral districts

Defunct federal electoral district
- Legislature: House of Commons
- District created: 2013
- District abolished: 2024
- First contested: 2015
- Last contested: 2021
- District webpage: profile, map

Demographics
- Population (2011): 114,378
- Electors (2015): 84,100
- Area (km²): 92
- Census division: Halton
- Census subdivision(s): Burlington, Oakville

Oakville North—Burlington (French: Oakville-Nord—Burlington) was a federal electoral district in Halton Region, Ontario.

== History ==
Oakville North—Burlington was created by the 2012 federal electoral boundaries redistribution and was legally defined in the 2013 representation order. It came into effect upon the call of the 42nd Canadian federal election, scheduled for October 2015. The riding was created out of part of the electoral district of Halton.

=== 2015 federal election ===
==== Conservative ====
On June 7, 2015, at the Burlington Convention Centre, Conservative members of the Oakville North—Burlington Electoral District Association nominated Effie Triantafilopoulos as their official candidate for the October 19, 2015 federal election.

==== Liberal ====
Ward 6 Councillor for Oakville, Max Khan bested aviation-pilot Rohit Dhamjia by an unknown number of votes in the party's nomination vote on September 25, 2014, in Oakville. Khan died at Oakville Trafalgar Memorial Hospital on March 29, 2015, vacating his role as the Liberals candidate. Oakville Town Councillor and longtime community volunteer Pam Damoff was acclaimed as the Liberal candidate on May 26, 2015.

=== 2022 redistribution ===
As a result of the 2022 electoral Redistribution this riding was abolished upon the calling of the 2025 Canadian federal election into the ridings of Burlington North-Milton West, Oakville West, and Oakville East.

== Demographics ==
According to the 2021 Canadian census

Ethnic groups: 54.9% White, 16.0% South Asian, 8.6% Chinese, 5.6% Arab, 3.4% Black, 2.5% Latin American, 1.8% Korean, 1.8% Filipino, 1.1% Indigenous, 1.1% West Asian

Languages: 57.5% English, 5.3% Mandarin, 4.1% Arabic, 2.6% Spanish, 2.5% Urdu, 1.7% Punjabi, 1.5% Portuguese, 1.4% Polish, 1.3% Korean, 1.3% Hindi, 1.3% French, 1.2% Cantonese, 1.1% Italian, 1.0% Russian

Religions: 52.4% Christian (29.6% Catholic, 4.1% Christian Orthodox, 3.2% Anglican, 2.8% United Church, 1.6% Presbyterian, 11.1% Other), 11.6% Muslim, 5.5% Hindu, 2.5% Sikh, 1.0% Buddhist, 26.2% None

Median income: $51,200 (2020)

Average income: $74,100 (2020)

== Members of Parliament ==
This riding has elected the following members of Parliament:

Parliament	Years	Member	Party
Oakville North—Burlington; Riding created from Halton
42nd	2015–2019	Pam Damoff	Liberal
43rd	2019–2021	Pam Damoff	Liberal
44th	2021–2025	Pam Damoff	Liberal
Riding dissolved into Burlington North—Milton West, Oakville West, and Oakville East

== Election results ==
View source data.
Graph of election results in Oakville North—Burlington (parties that never received at least 2% of the vote are omitted)

2021 Canadian federal election
Party	Candidate	Votes	%	±%	Expenditures
Liberal	Pam Damoff	30,910	46.8	–1.5	$71,960.98
Conservative	Hanan Rizkalla	25,091	38.0	±0.0	$81,816.65
New Democratic	Lenaee Dupuis	6,574	10.0	+1.6	$9,944.56
People's	Gilbert Jubinville	2,429	3.7	+2.6	$9,465.38
Green	Bruno Sousa	1,019	1.5	–2.7	$2,312.56
Total valid votes/Expense limit		66,023	99.2	–	$126,208.50
Total rejected ballots		533	0.8		
Turnout		66,556	66.9		
Eligible voters		99,493			
Liberal hold		Swing		-0.8	
Source: Elections Canada

2019 Canadian federal election
Party	Candidate	Votes	%	±%	Expenditures
Liberal	Pam Damoff	33,597	48.26	+1.52	$113,366.12
Conservative	Sean Weir	26,484	38.04	−5.29	$111,573.20
New Democratic	Nicolas Dion	5,866	8.43	+1.18	none listed
Green	Michael Houghton	2,925	4.20	+2.61	$332.94
People's	Gilbert Joseph Jubinville	751	1.08		none listed
Total valid votes/expense limit		69,623	99.41		
Total rejected ballots		412	0.59	+0.14	
Turnout		70,035	71.69	+0.45	
Eligible voters		97,696			
Liberal hold		Swing		+3.40	
Source: Elections Canada

2015 Canadian federal election
Party	Candidate	Votes	%	±%	Expenditures
Liberal	Pam Damoff	28,415	46.74	+19.77	$87,266.36
Conservative	Effie Triantafilopoulos	26,342	43.33	–10.83	$133,882.22
New Democratic	Janice Best	4,405	7.25	–8.26	$10,112.38
Green	Adnan Shahbaz	968	1.59	–1.51	$2,273.28
Libertarian	David Clement	666	1.10	–	$3,998.74
Total valid votes/expense limit		60,796	99.55		$223,412.78
Total rejected ballots		272	0.45	–	
Turnout		61,068	71.24	–	
Eligible voters		85,727			
Liberal notional gain from Conservative		Swing		+15.30	
Source: Elections Canada

2011 federal election redistributed results
Party	Vote	%
Conservative	25,368	54.16
Liberal	12,633	26.97
New Democratic	7,263	15.51
Green	1,452	3.10
Others	123	0.26

== See also ==
- List of Canadian electoral districts
- Historical federal electoral districts of Canada
- Oakville North—Burlington (provincial electoral district)
