= Women in the 41st Canadian Parliament =

The 41st Canadian Parliament includes a record number of female Members of Parliament, with 76 women elected to the House of Commons of Canada in the 2011 election. This represents a gain of seven seats over the previous record of 69 women in the 40th Canadian Parliament. By contrast, the 112th United States Congress had 72 women sitting in the 435-seat United States House of Representatives, and the 113th United States Congress has 81.

Of those 76 women, 38 were elected for the first time in the 2011 election. This included former PSAC president Nycole Turmel, who was the first woman to hold the position. She later accepted the role of interim leader of the NDP with the unanimous support of caucus, after Jack Layton took a temporary leave of absence to fight a second bout of cancer. Layton died on August 22, 2011, at which time Turmel formally assumed the title of Leader of the Opposition. She held the post until the election of Thomas Mulcair as leader of the NDP, and was the second woman to serve as Leader of the Opposition (the first was Deborah Grey).

The Green Party's Elizabeth May was the first woman leader of a political party to be elected to the House of Commons since former NDP leader Alexa McDonough. As they hold only two seats, the Greens are not recognized as having official party status in the House of Commons.

As well as a record number of women overall, the 41st Parliament will also contain a record number of younger women, with 18 women MPs who were under the age of 40 on election day, compared to just five in the previous Parliament.

The longest-serving women in the 41st Parliament are Hedy Fry and Diane Ablonczy, who were first elected in the 1993 election.

Three women who were elected in the 2011 election have since resigned their seats and four women have been elected in by-elections. As of November 17, 2014, there are 77 women currently serving in the House of Commons, and 258 women have served overall in the body's history.

== Party standings ==
Party	Total women candidates	% women candidates of total candidates	Total women elected	% women elected of total women candidates	% women elected of total elected
New Democrats	124 (of 308)	40.3%	40 (of 103)	32.3%	38.8%
Conservative	68 (of 307)	22.1%	28 (of 166)	41.2%	16.9%
Liberal	90 (of 308)	29.2%	7 (of 34)	6.7%	20.6%
Green	99 (of 304)	32.6%	1 (of 1)	1.0%	100.0%
Bloc Québécois	24 (of 75)	32.0%	1 (of 4)	4.2%	25.0%
Table source:

== Members ==
† denotes women who were newly elected in the 2011 election and are serving their first term in office. †† denotes women who were not members of the 40th Parliament, but previously served in another parliament.

Name	Party	Electoral district	Notes
Diane Ablonczy	Conservative	Calgary—Nose Hill
Eve Adams†	Liberal	Mississauga—Brampton South	Crossed the floor to the Liberal Party from Conservative Party on February 9, 2015.
Leona Aglukkaq	Conservative	Nunavut
Stella Ambler†	Conservative	Mississauga South
Rona Ambrose	Conservative	Edmonton—Spruce Grove
Niki Ashton	New Democrat	Churchill
Paulina Ayala†	New Democrat	Honoré-Mercier
Joyce Bateman†	Conservative	Winnipeg South Centre
Carolyn Bennett	Liberal	St. Paul's
Candice Bergen	Conservative	Portage—Lisgar
Lysane Blanchette-Lamothe†	New Democrat	Pierrefonds—Dollard
Kelly Block	Conservative	Saskatoon—Rosetown—Biggar
Françoise Boivin††	New Democrat	Gatineau
Charmaine Borg†	New Democrat	Terrebonne—Blainville
Marjolaine Boutin-Sweet†	New Democrat	Hochelaga
Ruth Ellen Brosseau†	New Democrat	Berthier—Maskinongé
Lois Brown	Conservative	Newmarket—Aurora
Chris Charlton	New Democrat	Hamilton Mountain
Olivia Chow	New Democrat	Trinity—Spadina	Resigned from the House of Commons on March 12, 2014.
Joan Crockatt	Conservative	Calgary Centre	Elected in a by-election on November 26, 2012.
Jean Crowder	New Democrat	Nanaimo—Cowichan
Pat Davidson	Conservative	Sarnia—Lambton
Libby Davies	New Democrat	Vancouver East
Anne-Marie Day†	New Democrat	Charlesbourg—Haute-Saint-Charles
Rosane Doré Lefebvre†	New Democrat	Alfred-Pellan
Kirsty Duncan	Liberal	Etobicoke North
Linda Duncan	New Democrat	Edmonton—Strathcona
Kerry-Lynne Findlay†	Conservative	Delta—Richmond East
Diane Finley	Conservative	Haldimand—Norfolk
Judy Foote	Liberal	Random—Burin—St. George's
Chrystia Freeland	Liberal	Toronto Centre	Elected in a by-election on November 25, 2013.
Mylène Freeman†	New Democratic Party	Argenteuil—Papineau—Mirabel
Hedy Fry	Liberal	Vancouver Centre
Cheryl Gallant	Conservative	Renfrew—Nipissing—Pembroke
Shelly Glover	Conservative	Saint Boniface
Nina Grewal	Conservative	Fleetwood—Port Kells
Sadia Groguhé†	New Democrat	Saint-Lambert
Sana Hassainia†	New Democrat	Verchères—Les Patriotes
Carol Hughes	New Democrat	Algoma—Manitoulin—Kapuskasing
Roxanne James†	Conservative	Scarborough Centre
Yvonne Jones	Liberal	Labrador	Elected in a by-election on May 13, 2013.
Alexandrine Latendresse†	New Democrat	Louis-Saint-Laurent
Hélène Laverdière†	New Democrat	Laurier—Sainte-Marie
Hélène LeBlanc†	New Democrat	LaSalle—Émard
Kellie Leitch†	Conservative	Simcoe—Grey
Megan Leslie	New Democrat	Halifax
Laurin Liu†	New Democrat	Rivière-des-Mille-Îles
Irene Mathyssen	New Democrat	London—Fanshawe
Elizabeth May†	Green	Saanich—Gulf Islands	Leader of the Green Party.
Cathy McLeod	Conservative	Kamloops—Thompson—Cariboo
Élaine Michaud†	New Democrat	Portneuf—Jacques-Cartier
Christine Moore†	New Democrat	Abitibi—Témiscamingue
Isabelle Morin†	New Democrat	Notre-Dame-de-Grâce—Lachine
Marie-Claude Morin†	New Democrat	Saint-Hyacinthe—Bagot
Maria Mourani	Bloc Québécois	Ahuntsic
Joyce Murray	Liberal	Vancouver Quadra
Peggy Nash††	New Democrat	Parkdale—High Park
Bev Oda	Conservative	Durham	Resigned from the House of Commons on July 31, 2012.
Tilly O'Neill-Gordon	Conservative	Miramichi
Annick Papillon†	New Democrat	Québec
Ève Péclet†	New Democrat	La Pointe-de-l'Île
Pat Perkins	Conservative	Whitby—Oshawa	Elected in a by-election on November 17, 2014.
Manon Perreault†	New Democrat	Montcalm
Anne Minh-Thu Quach†	New Democrat	Beauharnois—Salaberry
Lisa Raitt	Conservative	Halton
Francine Raynault†	New Democrat	Joliette
Michelle Rempel†	Conservative	Calgary Centre-North
Lise St-Denis†	New Democrat	Saint-Maurice—Champlain
Denise Savoie	New Democrat	Victoria	Resigned from the House of Commons on August 31, 2012.
Djaouida Sellah†	New Democrat	Saint-Bruno—Saint-Hubert
Jinny Sims†	New Democrat	Newton—North Delta
Judy Sgro	Liberal	York West
Gail Shea	Conservative	Egmont
Rathika Sitsabaiesan†	New Democrat	Scarborough—Rouge River
Joy Smith	Conservative	Kildonan—St. Paul
Susan Truppe†	Conservative	London North Centre
Nycole Turmel†	New Democrat	Hull—Aylmer	Interim Leader of the Official Opposition from August 23, 2011, to March 23, 2012.
Alice Wong	Conservative	Richmond
Lynne Yelich	Conservative	Blackstrap
Wai Young†	Conservative	Vancouver South
