= Long Range Mountains (electoral district) =

Federal electoral district in Newfoundland and Labrador, Canada

Newfoundland and Labrador electoral district
- Interactive map of riding boundaries from the 2025 federal election

Federal electoral district
- Legislature: House of Commons
MP
Carol Anstey
Conservative
- District created: 2013
- First contested: 2015
- Last contested: 2025
- District webpage: profile, map

Demographics
- Population (2016): 86,553
- Electors (2025): 70,091
- Area (km²): 41,606
- Pop. density (per km²): 2.1
- Census subdivision(s): Corner Brook, Stephenville, Deer Lake, Channel-Port aux Basques, Pasadena, St. Anthony, Kippens, Stephenville Crossing, Massey Drive, Humber Arm South

Long Range Mountains is a federal electoral district in the Canadian province of Newfoundland and Labrador. It covers the entirety of the west coast of the island of Newfoundland.

Long Range Mountains was created by the 2012 federal electoral boundaries redistribution and was legally defined in the 2013 representation order. It came into effect upon the call of the 42nd Canadian federal election, which took place in October 2015. It was created out of the electoral districts of Humber—St. Barbe—Baie Verte (65%) and Random—Burin—St. George's (35%).

== Geography ==
The riding covers the west coast of the island of Newfoundland, from Channel-Port aux Basques and Burgeo in the south, to St. Anthony and L'Anse aux Meadows in the north. The largest community in the riding is the city of Corner Brook. It also includes Gros Morne National Park.

== Demographics ==
According to the 2021 Canadian census; 2023 representation

Ethnic groups: 72.8% White, 25.6% Indigenous
Languages: 98.5% English
Religions: 86.5% Christian (32.4% Anglican, 30.6% Catholic, 8.7% United Church, 6.5% Pentecostal, 4.3% Methodist, 4.1% Other), 12.7% No religion
Median income (2020): $33,600
Average income (2020): $41,600

== History ==
The riding of Long Range Mountains was created in 2013 from the electoral districts of Humber—St. Barbe—Baie Verte and Random—Burin—St. George's.

Parliament	Years	Member	Party
Long Range Mountains; Riding created from Humber—St. Barbe—Baie Verte and Random—Burin—St. George's
42nd	2015–2019	Gudie Hutchings	Liberal
43rd	2019–2021	Gudie Hutchings	Liberal
44th	2021–2025	Gudie Hutchings	Liberal
45th	2025–present	Carol Anstey	Conservative

== Election results ==
Graph of election results in Long Range Mountains (minor parties that never got 2% of the vote or didn't run consistently are omitted)

=== 2025 ===
2025 Canadian federal election
Party	Candidate	Votes	%	±%	Expenditures
Conservative	Carol Anstey	23,232	50.35	+10.99	
Liberal	Don Bradshaw	19,726	42.75	−1.64	
New Democratic	Sarah Parsons	2,011	4.36	−7.57	
Independent	Robbie Coles	637	1.38		
People's	Pamela Geiger	537	1.16	−3.17	
Total valid votes/expense limit		46,143	99.03		
Total rejected ballots		452	0.97		
Turnout		46,595	65.00		
Eligible voters		71,680			
Conservative notional gain from Liberal		Swing		+6.32	
Source: Elections Canada

=== 2021 ===
2021 election by polling area

2021 Canadian federal election
Party	Candidate	Votes	%	±%	Expenditures
Liberal	Gudie Hutchings	16,178	44.39	-2.97	$92,705.20
Conservative	Carol Anstey	14,344	39.36	+11.06	$56,261.52
New Democratic	Kaila Mintz	4,347	11.93	-7.87	$6,169.08
People's	Darrell Shelley	1,578	4.33	–	none listed
Total valid votes/expense limit		36,447	98.75		$125,696.31
Total rejected ballots		461	1.25	-0.23	
Turnout		36,908	52.57	-2.61	
Registered voters		70,208			
Liberal hold		Swing		-7.02	
Source: Elections Canada

=== 2019 ===
2019 Canadian federal election
Party	Candidate	Votes	%	±%	Expenditures
Liberal	Gudie Hutchings	18,199	47.36	-26.49	$67,837.53
Conservative	Josh Eisses	10,873	28.30	+16.14	none listed
New Democratic	Holly Pike	7,609	19.80	+8.47	$43.82
Green	Lucas Knill	1,334	3.47	+0.81	$533.12
Veterans Coalition	Robert Miles	411	1.06	–	none listed
Total valid votes/expense limit		38,426	98.52	-1.22	122,089.44
Total rejected ballots		576	1.48	+1.22	
Turnout		39,002	56.21	-2.82	
Eligible voters		69,385			
Liberal hold		Swing		-26.49	
Source: Elections Canada

=== 2015 ===
2015 Canadian federal election
Party	Candidate	Votes	%	±%	Expenditures
Liberal	Gudie Hutchings	30,889	73.85	+18.70	$37,729.67
Conservative	Wayne Ruth	5,085	12.16	–13.09	$21,208.61
New Democratic	Devon Babstock	4,739	11.33	–6.51	$8,554.67
Green	Terry Cormier	1,111	2.66	+1.62	$2,064.79
Total valid votes/expense limit		41,824	100.00		$242,285.48
Total rejected ballots		108	0.26	–	
Turnout		41,932	59.03	–	
Eligible voters		71,037			
Liberal hold		Swing		+15.90	
Source: Elections Canada

2011 federal election redistributed results
Party	Vote	%
Liberal	19,770	55.16
Conservative	9,051	25.25
New Democratic	6,394	17.84
Green	370	1.03
Independent	258	0.72

== Student vote results ==
=== 2025 ===
2025 Canadian federal election
Party	Candidate	Votes	%
Conservative	Carol Anstey	1,148	46.97
Liberal	Don Bradshaw	676	27.66
New Democratic	Sarah Parsons	382	15.63
Independent	Robbie Coles	167	6.83
People's	Pamela Geiger	71	2.91
Total votes		2,444	100
Source: Student Vote Canada

=== 2021 ===
2021 Canadian federal election
Party	Candidate	Votes	%
Conservative	Carol Anstey	585	35.71
Liberal	Guide Hutchings	480	29.30
New Democratic	Kaila Mintz	405	24.73
People's	Darrell Shelley	168	10.26
Total votes		1,638	100
Total votes		2,444	100
Source: Student Vote Canada

=== 2019 ===
2019 Canadian federal election
Party	Candidate	Votes	%	±%
Liberal	Gudie Hutchings	843	31.05	-30.11
New Democratic	Holly Pike	723	26.63	+11.26
Conservative	Josh Eisses	514	18.93	+7.82
Green	Lucas Knill	462	17.02	+4.66
Veterans Coalition	Robert Miles	173	6.37	New
Total Valid Votes		2,715	100.0	–

=== 2015 ===
2015 Canadian federal election
Party	Candidate	Votes	%
Liberal	Gudie Hutchings	589	61.16
New Democratic	Devon Babstock	148	15.37
Green	Terry Cormier	119	12.36
Conservative	Wayne Ruth	107	11.11
Total Valid Votes		963	100.0

== See also ==
- List of Canadian electoral districts
- Historical federal electoral districts of Canada
