= Green Party of Canada candidates in the 2019 Canadian federal election =

This is a list of nominated candidates for the Green Party of Canada in the 2019 Canadian federal election.

== Candidate statistics ==
Candidates Nominated	Male Candidates	Female Candidates	Most Common Occupation

== Newfoundland and Labrador - 7 seats ==
Riding	Candidate's Name	Notes	Gender	Residence	Occupation	Votes	%	Rank	Ref.
Avalon	Greg Malone		M		Actor	2,215	5.36	4	
Bonavista—Burin—Trinity	Kelsey Reichel					920	2.90	4	
Coast of Bays—Central—Notre Dame	Byron White					1,363	4.00	4	
Labrador	Tyler Colbourne					224	2.00	4	
Long Range Mountains	Lucas Knill					1,334	3.50	4	
St. John's East	David Peters					821	1.82	4	
St. John's South—Mount Pearl	Alexandra Hayward					740	1.82	4	

== Prince Edward Island - 4 seats ==
Riding	Candidate's Name	Notes	Gender	Residence	Occupation	Votes	%	Rank	Ref.
Cardigan	Glen Beaton					3,068	13.84	3	
Charlottetown	Darcie Lanthier					4,648	23.35	2	
Egmont	Alex Clark					3,998	19.81	3	
Malpeque	Anna Keenan					3,381	14.32	3	

== Nova Scotia - 11 seats ==
Riding	Candidate's Name	Notes	Gender	Residence	Occupation	Votes	%	Rank	Ref.
Cape Breton—Canso	Clive Doucet					3,321	7.73	4	
Central Nova	Barry Randle					3,478	7.82	4	
Cumberland—Colchester	Jason Blanch					6,015	13.23	3	
Dartmouth—Cole Harbour	Lil MacPherson					5,280	9.87	4	
Halifax	Jo-Ann Roberts	Deputy Leader of the Green Party of Canada	F			8,013	14.37	3	
Halifax West	Richard Zurawski					6,555	12.06	4	
Kings—Hants	Brogan Anderson					6,029	12.55	4	
Sackville—Preston—Chezzetcook	Anthony Edmonds					5,725	11.56	4	
South Shore—St. Margarets	Thomas Trappenberg					6,070	11.56	4	
Sydney—Victoria	Lois Foster					2,249	5.54	5	
West Nova	Judy N. Green		F			5,939	12.69	3	

== New Brunswick - 10 seats ==
Riding	Candidate's Name	Notes	Gender	Residence	Occupation	Votes	%	Rank	Ref.
Acadie—Bathurst	Robert Kryszko					4,277	8.88	4	
Beauséjour	Laura Reinsborough					14,305	26.65	2	
Fredericton	Jenica Atwin		F	Rusagonis	Educator	16,640	33.68	1	
Fundy Royal	Tim Thompson					7,275	14.95	3	
Madawaska—Restigouche	Louis Bérubé					5,125	14.87	3	
Miramichi—Grand Lake	Patty Deitch					3,914	11.31	3	
Moncton—Riverview—Dieppe	Claire Kelly					9,287	17.92	3	
New Brunswick Southwest	Susan Jonah					5,352	13.52	3	
Saint John—Rothesay	Ann McAllister					4,165	10.10	4	
Tobique—Mactaquac	Rowan P. Miller					5,398	14.13	3	

== Nunavut - 1 seat ==
Riding	Candidate's Name	Notes	Gender	Residence	Occupation	Votes	%	Rank	Ref.
Nunavut	Douglas Roy	2011 candidate in Vancouver East	M	Kimmirut	School principal	206	2.18	4	

== Northwest Territories - 1 seat ==
Riding	Candidate's Name	Notes	Gender	Residence	Occupation	Votes	%	Rank	Ref.
Northwest Territories	Paul Falvo		M	Yellowknife	Lawyer	1,731	10.63	4	

== Yukon - 1 seat ==
Riding	Candidate's Name	Notes	Gender	Residence	Occupation	Votes	%	Rank	Ref.
Yukon	Lenore Morris		F	Whitehorse	Lawyer	2,201	10.47	4	

== See also ==
- Results of the 2015 Canadian federal election
- Results of the 2015 Canadian federal election by riding
