= Results of the 2015 Canadian federal election by riding =

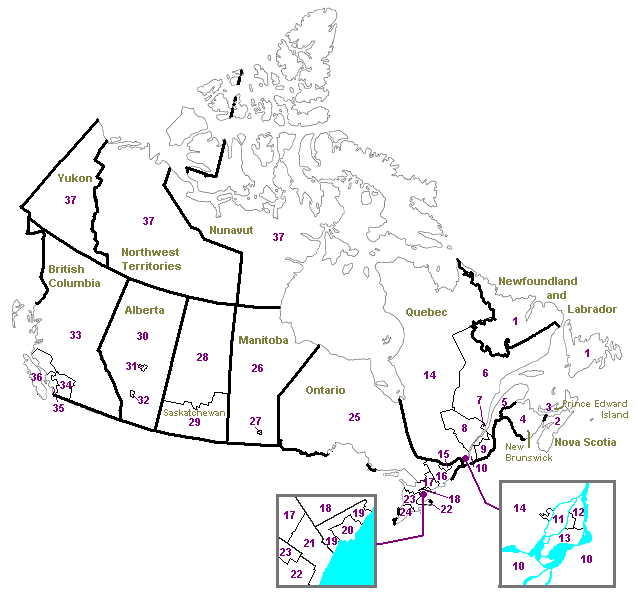
Canadian regions

Official results after judicial recounts.

Abbreviations guide:

- Animal All. - **Animal Alliance Environment Voters Party**
- AOTN - **Alliance of the North**
- BQ - **Bloc Québécois**
- Canada - **Canada Party**
- CAP - **Canadian Action Party**
- CHP - **Christian Heritage Party**
- Comm. - **Communist Party**
- Conservative - **Conservative Party**
- DAPC - **Democratic Advancement Party**
- Green - **Green Party**
- Ind. - **Independent**
- Liberal - **Liberal Party**
- Libert. - **Libertarian Party**
- Mar. - **Marijuana Party**
- M-L - **Marxist–Leninist Party**
- NA - **No Affiliation**
- NDP - **New Democratic Party**
- PACT - **Party for Accountability, Competency and Transparency**
- PC - **Progressive Canadian Party**
- Pirate - **Pirate Party**
- Rhino. - **Rhinoceros Party**
- SD - **Strength in Democracy**
- Seniors - **Seniors Party**
- TBP - **The Bridge Party**
- United - **United Party**
- All candidate names are those on the official list of confirmed candidates; names in media or on party website may differ slightly.
- Names in **boldface type** represent party leaders.
- † represents that the incumbent is not running again.
- § represents that the incumbent was defeated for nomination.
- ₰ represents that the incumbent was disqualified from their nomination contest.
- ‡ represents that the incumbent is running in a different district.
- (judicial recount) indicates that results have been certified by a judge following a judicial recount; all other totals are those validated by the Returning Officer.

== Newfoundland and Labrador ==
Electoral district	Candidates					Incumbent
Electoral district	Conservative	NDP	Liberal	Green	Other	Incumbent
Avalon	Lorraine E. Barnett; 4,670; 11.10%	Jeannie Baldwin; 6,075; 14.43%	Ken McDonald; 23,528; 55.90%	Krista Byrne-Puumala; 228; 0.54%	Scott Andrews (NA); 7,501 17.82%	Scott Andrews (Note: Scott Andrews was elected as a Liberal in the 2011 election but was suspended from the Liberal Party caucus in November 2014 by leader Justin Trudeau, following allegations of personal misconduct laid by two unnamed NDP MPs.)
Avalon	Lorraine E. Barnett; 4,670; 11.10%	Jeannie Baldwin; 6,075; 14.43%	Ken McDonald; 23,528; 55.90%	Krista Byrne-Puumala; 228; 0.54%	Jennifer McCreath (SD); 84 0.20%	Scott Andrews
Bonavista—Burin— Trinity	Mike Windsor; 3,534; 10.07%	Jenn Brown; 2,557; 7.29%	Judy M. Foote; 28,704; 81.80%	Tyler John Colbourne; 297; 0.85%		Judy Foote; Random—Burin—St. George's
Coast of Bays—Central— Notre Dame	Kevin George O'Brien; 6,479; 18.28%	Claudette Menchenton; 2,175; 6.14%	Scott Simms; 26,523; 74.82%	Elizabeth Perry; 271; 0.76%		Scott Simms; Bonavista—Gander—Grand Falls—Windsor
Labrador	Peter Penashue; 1,716; 13.87%	Edward Rudkowski; 1,779; 14.38%	Yvonne Jones; 8,878; 71.75%	(Note: Mary Lou Harley was announced on the Green Party website as their candidate for Labrador but did not register with Elections Canada.)		Yvonne Jones
Long Range Mountains	Wayne Ruth; 5,085; 12.16%	Devon Babstock; 4,739; 11.33%	Gudie Hutchings; 30,889; 73.85%	Terry Cormier; 1,111; 2.66%		Gerry Byrne†; Humber—St. Barbe—Baie Verte
St. John's East	Deanne Stapleton; 2,938; 6.55%	Jack Harris; 20,328; 45.29%	Nick Whalen; 20,974; 46.73%	David Anthony Peters; 500; 1.11%	Sean Burton (Comm.); 140; 0.31%	Jack Harris
St. John's South— Mount Pearl	Marek Krol; 2,047; 4.57%	Ryan Cleary; 16,467; 36.76%	Seamus O'Regan; 25,922; 57.86%	Jackson McLean; 365; 0.81%		Ryan Cleary

== Prince Edward Island ==
Electoral district	Candidates					Incumbent
Electoral district	Conservative	NDP	Liberal	Green	Christian Heritage	Incumbent
Cardigan	Julius Patkai; 3,632; 16.15%	Billy Cann; 2,503; 11.13%	Lawrence MacAulay; 14,621; 65.03%	Teresa Doyle; 1,434; 6.38%	Christene Squires; 295; 1.31%	Lawrence MacAulay
Charlottetown	Ron MacMillan; 3,136; 14.82%	Joe Byrne; 4,897; 23.14%	Sean Casey; 11,910; 56.27%	Becka Viau; 1,222; 5.77%		Sean Casey
Egmont	Gail Shea; 6,185; 28.95%	Herb Dickieson; 4,097; 19.18%	Bobby Morrissey; 10,521; 49.25%	Nils Ling; 559; 2.62%		Gail Shea
Malpeque	Stephen Stewart; 3,947; 17.56%	Leah-Jane Hayward; 2,509; 11.17%	Wayne Easter; 13,950; 62.08%	Lynne Lund; 2,066; 9.19%		Wayne Easter

== Nova Scotia ==
Electoral district	Candidates					Incumbent
Electoral district	Conservative	NDP	Liberal	Green	Other	Incumbent
Cape Breton—Canso	Adam Daniel Rodgers; 6,246; 14.45%	Michelle Smith; 3,547; 8.20%	Rodger Cuzner; 32,163; 74.39%	Maria Goretti Coady; 1,281; 2.96%		Rodger Cuzner
Central Nova	Fred DeLorey; 11,418; 25.80%	Ross Landry; 4,532; 10.24%	Sean Fraser; 25,909; 58.53%	David Hachey; 1,834; 4.14%	Alexander J. MacKenzie (Ind.); 570; 1.29%	Peter MacKay†
Cumberland—Colchester	Scott Armstrong; 12,257; 26.45%	Wendy Robinson; 2,647; 5.71%	Bill Casey; 29,527; 63.73%	Jason Matthew Blanch; 1,650; 3.56%	Kenneth Jackson (Ind.); 181 0.39%	Scott Armstrong; Cumberland—Colchester— Musquodoboit Valley
Cumberland—Colchester	Scott Armstrong; 12,257; 26.45%	Wendy Robinson; 2,647; 5.71%	Bill Casey; 29,527; 63.73%	Jason Matthew Blanch; 1,650; 3.56%	Richard Trueman Plett (Ind.); 70 0.15%	Scott Armstrong; Cumberland—Colchester— Musquodoboit Valley
Dartmouth—Cole Harbour	Jason Cole; 7,331; 14.03%	Robert Chisholm; 12,757; 24.41%	Darren Fisher; 30,407; 58.17%	Brynn Nheiley; 1,775; 3.40%		Robert Chisholm
Halifax	Irvine Carvery; 4,564; 8.61%	Megan Leslie; 19,162; 36.13%	Andy Fillmore; 27,431; 51.73%	Thomas Trappenberg; 1,745; 3.29%	Allan Bezanson (M-L); 130; 0.25%	Megan Leslie
Halifax West	Michael McGinnis; 7,837; 15.65%	Joanne Hussey; 5,894; 11.77%	Geoff Regan; 34,377; 68.65%	Richard Henryk Zurawski; 1,971; 3.94%		Geoff Regan
Kings—Hants	David Morse; 8,677; 18.59%	Hugh Curry; 2,998; 6.42%	Scott Brison; 33,026; 70.74%	Will Cooper; 1,569; 3.36%	Megan Brown-Hodges (Rhino.); 184 0.39%	Scott Brison
Kings—Hants	David Morse; 8,677; 18.59%	Hugh Curry; 2,998; 6.42%	Scott Brison; 33,026; 70.74%	Will Cooper; 1,569; 3.36%	Edd Twohig (Ind.); 132 0.28%	Scott Brison
Kings—Hants	David Morse; 8,677; 18.59%	Hugh Curry; 2,998; 6.42%	Scott Brison; 33,026; 70.74%	Will Cooper; 1,569; 3.36%	Clifford James Williams (Ind.); 100 0.21%	Scott Brison
Sackville—Preston—Chezzetcook	Robert Thomas Strickland; 7,186; 14.88%	Peter Stoffer; 16,613; 34.39%	Darrell Samson; 23,161; 47.95%	Mike Montgomery; 1,341; 2.78%		Peter Stoffer; Sackville—Eastern Shore
South Shore—St. Margarets	Richard Clark; 11,905; 22.56%	Alex Godbold; 8,883; 16.83%	Bernadette Jordan; 30,045; 56.93%	Richard Biggar; 1,534; 2.91%	Ryan Barry (Comm.); 151 0.29%	Gerald Keddy†; South Shore—St. Margaret's
South Shore—St. Margarets	Richard Clark; 11,905; 22.56%	Alex Godbold; 8,883; 16.83%	Bernadette Jordan; 30,045; 56.93%	Richard Biggar; 1,534; 2.91%	Trevor Bruhm (Ind.); 257 0.49%	Gerald Keddy†; South Shore—St. Margaret's
Sydney—Victoria	John Douglas Chiasson; 4,360; 10.64%	Monika Dutt; 5,351; 13.06%	Mark Eyking; 29,995; 73.20%	Adrianna MacKinnon; 1,026; 2.50%	Wayne James Hiscock (Libert.); 242; 0.59%	Mark Eyking
West Nova	Arnold LeBlanc; 11,916; 26.09%	Greg Foster; 3,084; 6.75%	Colin Fraser; 28,775; 62.99%	Clark Walton; 1,904; 4.17%		Greg Kerr†

== New Brunswick ==
Electoral district	Candidates					Incumbent
Electoral district	Conservative	NDP	Liberal	Green	Independent	Incumbent
Acadie—Bathurst	Riba Girouard-Riordon; 3,852; 7.56%	Jason Godin; 20,079; 39.40%	Serge Cormier; 25,845; 50.71%	Dominique Breau; 1,187; 2.33%		Yvon Godin†
Beauséjour	Ann Bastarache; 6,017; 11.37%	Hélène Boudreau; 8,009; 15.13%	Dominic LeBlanc; 36,534; 69.02%	Kevin King; 2,376; 4.49%		Dominic LeBlanc
Fredericton	Keith Ashfield; 13,280; 28.42%	Sharon Scott-Levesque; 4,622; 9.89%	Matt DeCourcey; 23,016; 49.26%	Mary Lou Babineau; 5,804; 12.42%		Keith Ashfield
Fundy Royal	Rob Moore; 17,361; 37.08%	Jennifer McKenzie; 8,204; 17.52%	Alaina Lockhart; 19,136; 40.87%	Stephanie Coburn; 1,823; 3.89%	David Raymond Amos; 296; 0.63%	Rob Moore
Madawaska—Restigouche	Bernard Valcourt; 6,151; 16.49%	Rosaire L'Italien; 9,670; 25.92%	René Arseneault; 20,778; 55.70%	Françoise Aubin; 707; 1.90%		Bernard Valcourt
Miramichi—Grand Lake	Tilly O'Neill-Gordon; 12,476; 34.31%	Patrick Colford; 5,588; 15.37%	Pat Finnigan; 17,202; 47.31%	Matthew Ian Clark; 1,098; 3.02%		Tilly O'Neill-Gordon; Miramichi
Moncton—Riverview— Dieppe	Robert Goguen; 11,168; 21.46%	Luc LeBlanc; 8,420; 16.18%	Ginette Petitpas Taylor; 30,054; 57.75%	Luc Melanson; 2,399; 4.61%		Robert Goguen
New Brunswick Southwest	John Williamson; 14,625; 38.56%	Andrew Graham; 4,768; 12.57%	Karen Ludwig; 16,656; 43.92%	Gayla MacIntosh; 1,877; 4.95%		John Williamson
Saint John—Rothesay	Rodney Weston; 12,915; 30.55%	AJ Griffin; 7,411; 17.53%	Wayne Long; 20,634; 48.80%	Sharon Murphy; 1,321; 3.12%		Rodney Weston; Saint John
Tobique—Mactaquac	Richard Bragdon; 14,225; 37.02%	Robert Kitchen; 4,334; 11.28%	T. J. Harvey; 17,909; 46.61%	Terry Wishart; 1,959; 5.10%		Mike Allen†

== Quebec ==
=== Eastern Quebec ===
Electoral district	Candidates							Incumbent
Electoral district	Conservative	NDP	Liberal	BQ	Green	Rhinoceros	Strength in Democracy	Incumbent
Avignon—La Mitis—Matane—Matapédia	André Savoie; 2,228; 6.13%	Joël Charest; 7,340; 20.19%	Rémi Massé; 14,378; 39.55%	Kédina Fleury-Samson; 7,641; 21.02%	Sherri Springle; 365; 1.00%	Éric Normand; 175; 0.48%	**Jean-François Fortin**; 4,229; 11.63%	**Jean-François Fortin** (Note: Elected as a Bloc MP in 2011, left the caucus to seat as an Independent MP in August 2014 and joined the Strength in Democracy caucus in October 2014.); Haute-Gaspésie—La Mitis—Matane—Matapédia
Bellechasse—Les Etchemins—Lévis	Steven Blaney; 31,872; 50.92%	Jean-Luc Daigle; 8,516; 13.60%	Jacques Turgeon; 12,961; 20.71%	Antoine Dubé; 7,217; 11.53%	André Bélisle; 2,032; 3.25%			Steven Blaney; Lévis—Bellechasse
Gaspésie—Les Îles-de-la-Madeleine	Jean-Pierre Pigeon; 2,398; 6.05%	Philip Toone; 12,885; 32.52%	Diane Lebouthillier; 15,345; 38.73%	Nicolas Roussy; 8,289; 20.92%	Jim Morrison; 400; 1.01%	Max Boudreau; 300; 0.76%		Philip Toone; Gaspésie—Îles-de-la-Madeleine
Montmagny—L'Islet—Kamouraska—Rivière-du-Loup (Note: Results after the judicial recount.)	Bernard Généreux; 14,274; 28.99%	François Lapointe; 11,918; 24.20%	Marie-Josée Normand; 14,002; 28.43%	Louis Gagnon; 7,939; 16.12%	Chantal Breton; 823; 1.67%	Bien Gras Gagné; 287; 0.58%		François Lapointe
Rimouski-Neigette—Témiscouata—Les Basques	Francis Fortin; 3,363; 7.48%	Guy Caron; 19,374; 43.11%	Pierre Cadieux; 12,594; 28.02%	Johanne Carignan; 8,673; 19.30%	Louise Boutin; 669; 1.49%	**Sébastien CôRhino Côrriveau**; 273; 0.61%		Guy Caron

=== Côte-Nord and Saguenay ===
Electoral district	Candidates						Incumbent
Electoral district	Conservative	NDP	Liberal	BQ	Green	Other	Incumbent
Beauport—Côte-de-Beaupré—Île d'Orléans—Charlevoix	Sylvie Boucher; 16,903; 33.50%	Jonathan Tremblay; 9,306; 18.44%	Jean-Roger Vigneau; 13,556; 26.87%	Sébastien Dufour; 9,650; 19.13%	Patrick Kerr; 859; 1.70%	Mario Desjardins Pelchat (SD); 182; 0.36%	Jonathan Tremblay; Montmorency—Charlevoix— Haute-Côte-Nord
Chicoutimi—Le Fjord	Caroline Ste-Marie; 7,270; 16.60%	Dany Morin; 13,019; 29.72%	Denis Lemieux; 13,619; 31.09%	Élise Gauthier; 8,990; 20.52%	Dany St-Gelais; 907; 2.07%		Dany Morin
Jonquière	Ursula Larouche; 8,124; 16.89%	Karine Trudel; 14,039; 29.19%	Marc Pettersen; 13,700; 28.48%	Jean-François Caron; 11,202; 23.29%	Carmen Budilean; 656; 1.36%	Marielle Couture (Rhino.); 382; 0.79%	Claude Patry†; Jonquière—Alma
Lac-Saint-Jean	Denis Lebel; 18,393; 33.27%	Gisèle Dallaire; 15,735; 28.46%	Sabin Simard; 10,193; 18.44%	Sabin Gaudreault; 10,152; 18.37%	Laurence Requilé; 806; 1.46%		Denis Lebel; Roberval—Lac-Saint-Jean
Manicouagan	Yvon Boudreau; 4,317; 10.27%	Jonathan Genest-Jourdain; 7,359; 17.51%	Mario Tremblay; 12,343; 29.37%	Marilène Gill; 17,338; 41.25%	Nathan Grills; 673; 1.60%		Jonathan; Genest-Jourdain

=== Quebec City ===
Electoral district	Candidates						Incumbent
Electoral district	Conservative	NDP	Liberal	BQ	Green	Other	Incumbent
Beauport—Limoilou	Alupa Clarke; 15,461; 30.58%	Raymond Côté; 12,881; 25.48%	Antoine Bujold; 12,854; 25.42%	Doni Berberi; 7,467; 14.77%	Dalila Elhak; 1,220; 2.41%	Francis Bedard (Libert.); 423 0.84%	Raymond Côté
Beauport—Limoilou	Alupa Clarke; 15,461; 30.58%	Raymond Côté; 12,881; 25.48%	Antoine Bujold; 12,854; 25.42%	Doni Berberi; 7,467; 14.77%	Dalila Elhak; 1,220; 2.41%	Bladimir Laborit (SD); 124 0.25%	Raymond Côté
Beauport—Limoilou	Alupa Clarke; 15,461; 30.58%	Raymond Côté; 12,881; 25.48%	Antoine Bujold; 12,854; 25.42%	Doni Berberi; 7,467; 14.77%	Dalila Elhak; 1,220; 2.41%	Claude Moreau (M-L); 128 0.25%	Raymond Côté
Charlesbourg—Haute-Saint-Charles	Pierre Paul-Hus; 24,608; 42.24%	Anne-Marie Day; 11,690; 20.07%	Jean Côté; 13,525; 23.22%	Marc Antoine Turmel; 7,177; 12.32%	Nathalie Baudet; 1,256; 2.16%		Anne-Marie Day
Louis-Hébert	Jean-Pierre Asselin; 16,789; 27.19%	Denis Blanchette; 12,850; 20.81%	Joël Lightbound; 21,516; 34.85%	Caroline Pageau; 8,900; 14.41%	Andrée-Anne Beaudoin-Julien; 1,561; 2.53%	Stefan Jetchick (CHP); 128; 0.21%	Denis Blanchette
Louis-Saint-Laurent	Gérard Deltell; 32,637; 50.46%	G. Daniel Caron; 10,296; 15.92%	Youri Rousseau; 13,852; 21.42%	Ronald Sirard; 6,688; 10.34%	Michel Savard; 1,210; 1.87%		Alexandrine Latendresse†
Québec	Pierre-Thomas Asselin; 11,737; 21.79%	Annick Papillon; 14,566; 27.04%	Jean-Yves Duclos; 15,566; 28.90%	Charles Mordret; 10,153; 18.85%	Philippe Riboty; 1,570; 2.91%	Normand Fournier (M-L); 153 0.28%	Annick Papillon
Québec	Pierre-Thomas Asselin; 11,737; 21.79%	Annick Papillon; 14,566; 27.04%	Jean-Yves Duclos; 15,566; 28.90%	Charles Mordret; 10,153; 18.85%	Philippe Riboty; 1,570; 2.91%	Danielle Provost (SD); 122 0.23%	Annick Papillon

=== Central Quebec ===
Electoral district	Candidates						Incumbent
Electoral district	Conservative	NDP	Liberal	BQ	Green	Other	Incumbent
Bécancour—Nicolet—Saurel	Yves Laberge; 5,955; 11.41%	Nicolas Tabah; 11,531; 22.09%	Claude Carpentier; 12,666; 24.26%	Louis Plamondon; 20,871; 39.98%	Corina Bastiani; 1,182; 2.26%		Louis Plamondon; Bas-Richelieu—Nicolet—Bécancour
Berthier—Maskinongé	Marianne Foucrault; 5,548; 10.20%	Ruth Ellen Brosseau; 22,942; 42.17%	Pierre Destrempes; 11,032; 20.28%	Yves Perron; 14,037; 25.80%	Cate Burton; 847; 1.56%		Ruth Ellen Brosseau
Joliette	Soheil Eid; 5,705; 10.06%	Danielle Landreville; 14,566; 25.69%	Michel Bourgeois; 15,995; 28.22%	Gabriel Ste-Marie; 18,875; 33.30%	Mathieu Morin; 1,335; 2.35%	Robert D. Morais (SD); 213; 0.38%	Francine Raynault§
Lévis—Lotbinière	Jacques Gourde; 31,357; 50.10%	Hélène Bilodeau; 9,246; 14.77%	Claude Boucher; 13,562; 21.67%	Steve Gagné; 7,163; 11.44%	Tina Biello; 1,124; 1.80%	**François Belanger** (AOTN); 136; 0.22%	Jacques Gourde; Lotbinière—Chutes-de-la-Chaudière
Montcalm	Gisèle DesRoches; 5,093; 9.61%	Martin Leclerc; 12,431; 23.45%	Louis-Charles Thouin; 14,484; 27.32%	Luc Thériault; 19,405; 36.61%	Yumi Yow Mei Ang; 976; 1.84%	Manon Perreault (SD); 620; 1.17%	Manon Perreault (Note: Perreault sat as an independent at dissolution then joined Strength in Democracy after writ was dropped.)
Portneuf—Jacques-Cartier	Joël Godin; 27,290; 43.97%	Élaine Michaud; 13,686; 22.05%	David Gauvin; 13,322; 21.47%	Raymond Harvey; 6,665; 10.74%	Johanne Morin; 1,096; 1.77%		Élaine Michaud
Repentigny	Jonathan Lefebvre; 7,053; 10.82%	Réjean Bellemare; 15,167; 23.26%	Adriana Dudas; 17,798; 27.29%	Monique Pauzé; 22,618; 34.68%	Yoland Gilbert; 1,242; 1.90%	Johnathan Cloutier (SD); 1,333; 2.04%	Jean-François Larose‡
Saint-Maurice—Champlain	Jacques Grenier; 9,592; 16.27%	Jean-Yves Tremblay; 12,245; 20.77%	François-Philippe Champagne; 24,475; 41.52%	Sacki Carignan Deschamps; 11,295; 19.16%	Martial Toupin; 1,144; 1.94%	Jean-Paul Bédard (M-L); 196; 0.33%	Lise St-Denis†
Trois-Rivières	Dominic Therrien; 11,231; 18.63%	Robert Aubin; 19,193; 31.83%	Yvon Boivin; 18,224; 30.23%	André Valois; 10,249; 17.00%	Éric Trottier; 1,032; 1.71%	Maxime Rousseau (Libert.); 360; 0.60%	Robert Aubin

=== Eastern Townships ===
Electoral district	Candidates						Incumbent
Electoral district	Conservative	NDP	Liberal	BQ	Green	Other	Incumbent
Beauce	Maxime Bernier; 32,910; 58.89%	Daniel Royer; 5,443; 9.74%	Adam Veilleux; 12,442; 22.26%	Stéphane Trudel; 4,144; 7.42%	Céline Brown MacDonald; 943; 1.69%		Maxime Bernier
Brome—Missisquoi	Charles Poulin; 6,724; 11.46%	Catherine Lusson; 14,383; 24.51%	Denis Paradis; 25,744; 43.88%	Patrick Melchior; 10,252; 17.47%	Cindy Moynan; 1,377; 2.35%	Patrick Paine (SD); 195; 0.33%	Pierre Jacob†
Compton—Stanstead	Gustavo Labrador; 6,978; 12.50%	Jean Rousseau; 15,300; 27.41%	Marie-Claude Bibeau; 20,582; 36.88%	France Bonsant; 11,551; 20.70%	Korie Marshall; 1,085; 1.94%	Kévin Côté (Rhino.); 315; 0.56%	Jean Rousseau
Drummond	Pascale Déry; 9,221; 17.74%	François Choquette; 15,833; 30.46%	Pierre Côté; 13,793; 26.54%	Diane Bourgeois; 11,862; 22.82%	Émile Coderre; 1,270; 2.44%		François Choquette
Mégantic—L'Érable	Luc Berthold; 16,749; 35.42%	Jean-François Delisle; 10,386; 21.96%	David Berthiaume; 13,308; 28.14%	Virginie Provost; 5,838; 12.35%	Justin Gervais; 1,006; 2.13%		Christian Paradis†
Richmond—Arthabaska	Alain Rayes; 18,505; 31.57%	Myriam Beaulieu; 14,213; 24.25%	Marc Desmarais; 14,463; 24.67%	Olivier Nolin; 10,068; 17.18%	Laurier Busque; 984; 1.68%	Antoine Dubois (Rhino.); 384; 0.66%	André Bellavance†
Saint-Hyacinthe—Bagot	Réjean Léveillé; 9,098; 16.73%	Brigitte Sansoucy; 15,578; 28.65%	René Vincelette; 14,980; 27.55%	Michel Filion; 13,200; 24.28%	Lise Durand; 1,243; 2.29%	Ugo Ménard (Ind.); 270; 0.50%	Marie-Claude Morin†
Shefford	Sylvie Fontaine; 7,529; 12.78%	Claire Mailhot; 13,945; 23.67%	Pierre Breton; 22,957; 38.96%	Jocelyn Beaudoin; 13,092; 22.22%	Simon McMillan; 1,397; 2.37%		Réjean Genest†
Sherbrooke	Marc Dauphin; 5,391; 9.41%	Pierre-Luc Dusseault; 21,410; 37.36%	Thomas "Tom" Allen; 17,071; 29.79%	Caroline Bouchard; 11,717; 20.45%	Sophie Malouin; 1,143; 1.99%	Benoit Huberdeau (Ind.); 303 0.53%	Pierre-Luc Dusseault
Sherbrooke	Marc Dauphin; 5,391; 9.41%	Pierre-Luc Dusseault; 21,410; 37.36%	Thomas "Tom" Allen; 17,071; 29.79%	Caroline Bouchard; 11,717; 20.45%	Sophie Malouin; 1,143; 1.99%	Hubert Richard (Rhino.); 265 0.46%	Pierre-Luc Dusseault

=== Montérégie ===
Electoral district	Candidates						Incumbent
Electoral district	Conservative	NDP	Liberal	BQ	Green	Other	Incumbent
Beloeil—Chambly	Claude Chalhoub; 6,173; 9.29%	Matthew Dubé; 20,641; 31.07%	Karine Desjardins; 19,494; 29.34%	Yves Lessard; 18,387; 27.68%	Fodé Kerfalla Yansané; 1,498; 2.25%	Michael Maher (Libert.); 245; 0.37%	Matthew Dubé; Chambly—Borduas
Brossard—Saint-Lambert	Qais Hamidi; 7,215; 12.60%	Hoang Mai; 14,075; 24.58%	Alexandra Mendès; 28,818; 50.33%	Suzanne Lachance; 6,071; 10.60%	Fang Hu; 1,081; 1.89%		Hoang Mai; Brossard—La Prairie
Châteauguay—Lacolle	Philippe St-Pierre; 5,805; 11.21%	Sylvain Chicoine; 11,986; 23.15%	Brenda Shanahan; 20,245; 39.10%	Sophie Stanké; 12,615; 24.36%	Jency Mercier; 982; 1.90%	Linda Sullivan (M-L); 149; 0.29%	Sylvain Chicoine; Châteauguay—Saint-Constant
La Prairie	Yves Perras; 6,859; 11.91%	Pierre Chicoine; 13,174; 22.88%	Jean-Claude Poissant; 20,993; 36.46%	Christian Picard; 15,107; 26.24%	Joanne Tomas; 1,235; 2.15%	Normand Chouinard (M-L); 204; 0.35%	New District
Longueuil—Charles-LeMoyne	Thomas Barré; 4,961; 9.59%	Sadia Groguhé; 12,468; 24.11%	Sherry Romanado; 18,301; 35.39%	Philippe Cloutier; 13,974; 27.03%	Mario Leclerc; 1,510; 2.92%	Pierre Chénier (M-L); 168 0.32%	Sadia Groguhé; Saint-Lambert
Longueuil—Charles-LeMoyne	Thomas Barré; 4,961; 9.59%	Sadia Groguhé; 12,468; 24.11%	Sherry Romanado; 18,301; 35.39%	Philippe Cloutier; 13,974; 27.03%	Mario Leclerc; 1,510; 2.92%	Matthew Iakov Liberman (Rhino.); 325 0.63%	Sadia Groguhé; Saint-Lambert
Longueuil—Saint-Hubert	John Sedlak; 5,087; 8.74%	Pierre Nantel; 18,171; 31.22%	Michael O'Grady; 17,468; 30.01%	Denis Trudel; 15,873; 27.27%	Casandra Poitras; 1,447; 2.49%	Affine Lwalalika (SD); 153; 0.26%	Pierre Nantel; Longueuil—Pierre-Boucher
Montarville	Stéphane Duranleau; 6,284; 10.85%	Djaouida Sellah; 14,296; 24.68%	Michel Picard; 18,848; 32.54%	Catherine Fournier; 16,460; 28.42%	Olivier Adam; 1,388; 2.40%	Claude Leclair (Libert.); 641; 1.11%	Djaouida Sellah; Saint-Bruno—Saint-Hubert
Pierre-Boucher—Les Patriotes— Verchères	Clovis Maheux; 6,079; 10.24%	Raphaël Fortin; 14,454; 24.34%	Lucie Gagnon; 16,794; 28.28%	Xavier Barsalou-Duval; 17,007; 28.64%	JiCi Lauzon; 5,056; 8.51%		Sana Hassainia†; Verchères—Les Patriotes
Saint-Jean	Stéphane Guinta; 6,549; 10.85%	Hans Marotte; 17,555; 29.07%	Jean Rioux; 20,022; 33.16%	Denis Hurtubise; 14,979; 24.81%	Marilyn Redivo; 1,281; 2.12%		Tarik Brahmi†
Salaberry—Suroît	Albert De Martin; 6,132; 9.97%	Anne Minh-Thu Quach; 18,726; 30.43%	Robert Sauvé; 17,955; 29.18%	Claude DeBellefeuille; 17,452; 28.36%	Nicola-Silverado Socrates; 867; 1.41%	Patricia Domingos (SD); 184 0.30%	Anne Minh-Thu Quach; Beauharnois—Salaberry
Salaberry—Suroît	Albert De Martin; 6,132; 9.97%	Anne Minh-Thu Quach; 18,726; 30.43%	Robert Sauvé; 17,955; 29.18%	Claude DeBellefeuille; 17,452; 28.36%	Nicola-Silverado Socrates; 867; 1.41%	Sylvain Larocque (Ind.); 219 0.36%	Anne Minh-Thu Quach; Beauharnois—Salaberry
Vaudreuil—Soulanges	Marc Boudreau; 9,048; 13.81%	Jamie Nicholls; 14,627; 22.32%	Peter Schiefke; 30,550; 46.62%	Vincent François; 9,858; 15.04%	Jennifer Kaszel; 1,445; 2.21%		Jamie Nicholls; Vaudreuil-Soulanges

=== Eastern Montreal ===
Electoral district	Candidates								Incumbent
Electoral district	Conservative	NDP	Liberal	BQ	Green	Marxist-Leninist	Rhinoceros	Other	Incumbent
Hochelaga (judicial recount)	Alexandre Dang; 3,555; 6.85%	Marjolaine Boutin-Sweet; 16,034; 30.89%	Marwah Rizqy; 15,534; 29.93%	Simon Marchand; 14,389; 27.72%	Anne-Marie Saint-Cerny; 1,654; 3.19%	Christine Dandenault; 148; 0.29%	Nicolas Lemay; 411; 0.79%	Marianne Breton Fontaine (Comm.); 179; 0.34%	Marjolaine Boutin-Sweet
Honoré-Mercier	Guy Croteau; 6,226; 12.05%	Paulina Ayala; 8,478; 16.41%	Pablo Rodriguez; 29,211; 56.55%	Audrey Beauséjour; 6,680; 12.93%	Angela Budilean; 814; 1.58%	Yves Le Seigle; 81; 0.16%		Dayana Dejean (SD); 168; 0.33%	Paulina Ayala
La Pointe-de-l'Île	Guy Morissette; 4,408; 7.98%	Ève Péclet; 14,777; 26.76%	Marie-Chantale Simard; 15,777; 28.57%	Mario Beaulieu; 18,545; 33.58%	David J. Cox; 1,130; 2.05%	Geneviève Royer; 96; 0.17%	Ben 97 Benoit; 358; 0.65%	Jean-François Larose (SD); 135; 0.24%	Ève Péclet
Laurier—Sainte-Marie	Daniel Gaudreau; 2,242; 4.10%	Hélène Laverdière; 20,929; 38.27%	Christine Poirier; 12,938; 23.66%	**Gilles Duceppe**; 15,699; 28.71%	Cyrille Giraud; 1,904; 3.48%	Serge Lachapelle; 103; 0.19%		Stéphane Beaulieu (Libert.); 604 1.10%	Hélène Laverdière
Laurier—Sainte-Marie	Daniel Gaudreau; 2,242; 4.10%	Hélène Laverdière; 20,929; 38.27%	Christine Poirier; 12,938; 23.66%	**Gilles Duceppe**; 15,699; 28.71%	Cyrille Giraud; 1,904; 3.48%	Serge Lachapelle; 103; 0.19%		Julien Bernatchez (Ind.); 160 0.29%	Hélène Laverdière
Laurier—Sainte-Marie	Daniel Gaudreau; 2,242; 4.10%	Hélène Laverdière; 20,929; 38.27%	Christine Poirier; 12,938; 23.66%	**Gilles Duceppe**; 15,699; 28.71%	Cyrille Giraud; 1,904; 3.48%	Serge Lachapelle; 103; 0.19%		Pierre Fontaine (Comm.); 102 0.19%	Hélène Laverdière
Rosemont—La Petite-Patrie	Jeremy Dohan; 2,510; 4.30%	Alexandre Boulerice; 28,672; 49.15%	Nadine Medawar; 12,068; 20.69%	Claude André; 12,283; 21.06%	Sameer Muldeen; 1,783; 3.06%	Stéphane Chénier; 171; 0.29%	Laurent Aglat; 495; 0.85%	Peter d'Entremont (Libert.); 353; 0.61%	Alexandre Boulerice

=== Western Montreal ===
Electoral district	Candidates						Incumbent
Electoral district	Conservative	NDP	Liberal	BQ	Green	Other	Incumbent
Dorval—Lachine—LaSalle	Daniela Chivu; 6,049; 11.08%	Isabelle Morin; 11,769; 21.55%	Anju Dhillon; 29,974; 54.89%	Jean-Frédéric Vaudry; 5,338; 9.78%	Vincent J. Carbonneau; 1,245; 2.28%	Soulèye Ndiaye (Ind.); 230; 0.42%	Isabelle Morin; Notre-Dame-de-Grâce—Lachine
Lac-Saint-Louis	Eric Girard; 10,857; 17.42%	Ryan Young; 7,997; 12.83%	Francis Scarpaleggia; 39,965; 64.14%	Gabriel Bernier; 1,681; 2.70%	Bradford Dean; 1,812; 2.91%		Francis Scarpaleggia
LaSalle—Émard—Verdun	Mohammad Zamir; 3,713; 6.91%	Hélène LeBlanc; 15,566; 28.95%	David Lametti; 23,603; 43.90%	Gilbert Paquette; 9,164; 17.05%	Lorraine Banville; 1,717; 3.19%		Hélène LeBlanc; LaSalle—Émard
Mount Royal	Robert Libman; 18,201; 37.88%	Mario Jacinto Rimbao; 3,884; 8.08%	Anthony Housefather; 24,187; 50.34%	Jade Bossé-Bélanger; 908; 1.89%	Timothy Landry; 747; 1.55%	Diane Johnston (M-L); 124; 0.26%	Irwin Cotler†
Notre-Dame-de-Grâce—Westmount	Richard Sagala; 7,414; 14.37%	James Hughes; 11,229; 21.76%	Marc Garneau; 29,755; 57.67%	Simon Quesnel; 1,282; 2.48%	Melissa Kate Wheeler; 1,581; 3.06%	Lisa Julie Cahn (Ind.); 151 0.29%	Marc Garneau; Westmount—Ville-Marie
Notre-Dame-de-Grâce—Westmount	Richard Sagala; 7,414; 14.37%	James Hughes; 11,229; 21.76%	Marc Garneau; 29,755; 57.67%	Simon Quesnel; 1,282; 2.48%	Melissa Kate Wheeler; 1,581; 3.06%	Rachel Hoffman (M-L); 181 0.35%	Marc Garneau; Westmount—Ville-Marie
Outremont	Rodolphe Husny; 4,159; 9.53%	**Tom Mulcair**; 19,242; 44.11%	Rachel Bendayan; 14,597; 33.46%	Roger Galland Barou; 3,668; 8.41%	Amara Diallo; 1,575; 3.61%	Francis Pouliot (Libert.); 216 0.50%	**Tom Mulcair**
Outremont	Rodolphe Husny; 4,159; 9.53%	**Tom Mulcair**; 19,242; 44.11%	Rachel Bendayan; 14,597; 33.46%	Roger Galland Barou; 3,668; 8.41%	Amara Diallo; 1,575; 3.61%	Adrien Welsh (Comm.); 162 0.37%	**Tom Mulcair**
Pierrefonds—Dollard	Valérie Assouline; 11,694; 19.99%	Lysane Blanchette-Lamothe; 9,584; 16.38%	Frank Baylis; 34,319; 58.66%	Natalie Laplante; 2,043; 3.49%	Abraham Weizfeld; 865; 1.48%		Lysane Blanchette-Lamothe
Saint-Laurent	Jimmy Yu; 7,867; 19.51%	Alain Ackad; 4,646; 11.52%	Stéphane Dion; 24,832; 61.57%	Pascal-Olivier Dumas-Dubreuil; 1,879; 4.66%	John Tromp; 977; 2.42%	Fernand Deschamps (M-L); 129; 0.32%	Stéphane Dion; Saint-Laurent—Cartierville
Ville-Marie–Le Sud-Ouest–Île-des-Sœurs	Steve Shanahan; 5,948; 11.86%	Allison Turner; 11,757; 23.44%	Marc Miller; 25,491; 50.82%	Chantal St-Onge; 4,307; 8.59%	Daniel Green; 2,398; 4.78%	William Sloan (Comm.); 102 0.20%	Tyrone Benskin§ Jeanne-Le Ber
Ville-Marie–Le Sud-Ouest–Île-des-Sœurs	Steve Shanahan; 5,948; 11.86%	Allison Turner; 11,757; 23.44%	Marc Miller; 25,491; 50.82%	Chantal St-Onge; 4,307; 8.59%	Daniel Green; 2,398; 4.78%	Daniel Wolfe (Rhino.); 161 0.32%	Tyrone Benskin§ Jeanne-Le Ber

=== Northern Montreal and Laval ===
Electoral district	Candidates							Incumbent
Electoral district	Conservative	NDP	Liberal	BQ	Green	Marxist-Leninist	Other	Incumbent
Ahuntsic-Cartierville	Wiliam Moughrabi; 4,051; 7.29%	Maria Mourani; 16,684; 30.03%	Mélanie Joly; 26,026; 46.84%	Nicolas Bourdon; 7,346; 13.22%	Gilles Mercier; 1,175; 2.11%		Catherine Gascon-David (Rhino.); 285; 0.51%	Maria Mourani (Note: Mourani sat as an Independent after leaving the BQ; NDP policy did not allow her to join their caucus before the election.); Ahuntsic
Alfred-Pellan	Gabriel Purcarus; 6,259; 11.35%	Rosane Doré Lefebvre; 13,225; 23.97%	Angelo Iacono; 24,557; 44.51%	Daniel St-Hilaire; 9,836; 17.83%	Lynda Briguene; 1,089; 1.97%		Renata Isopo (Ind.); 203; 0.37%	Rosane Doré Lefebvre
Bourassa	Jason Potasso-Justino; 3,819; 9.29%	Dolmine Laguerre; 6,144; 14.94%	Emmanuel Dubourg; 22,234; 54.06%	Gilles Léveillé; 7,049; 17.14%	Maxime Charron; 886; 2.15%	Claude Brunelle; 229; 0.56%	Julie Demers (Ind.); 669 1.63%	Emmanuel Dubourg
Bourassa	Jason Potasso-Justino; 3,819; 9.29%	Dolmine Laguerre; 6,144; 14.94%	Emmanuel Dubourg; 22,234; 54.06%	Gilles Léveillé; 7,049; 17.14%	Maxime Charron; 886; 2.15%	Claude Brunelle; 229; 0.56%	Jean-Marie Floriant Ndzana (SD); 99 0.24%	Emmanuel Dubourg
Laval—Les Îles	Roland Dick; 9,811; 18.10%	François Pilon; 10,710; 19.76%	Fayçal El-Khoury; 25,857; 47.70%	Nancy Redhead; 6,731; 12.42%	Faiza R'Guiba-Kalogerakis; 921; 1.70%	Yvon Breton; 175; 0.32%		François Pilon
Marc-Aurèle-Fortin	Nicolas Makridis; 6,498; 11.92%	Marie-Josée Lemieux; 12,827; 23.52%	Yves Robillard; 22,323; 40.94%	Patrice Jasmin-Tremblay; 11,820; 21.68%	Lorna Mungur; 1,057; 1.94%			Alain Giguère‡
Papineau	Yvon Vadnais; 2,390; 4.71%	Anne Lagacé Dowson; 13,132; 25.87%	**Justin Trudeau**; 26,391; 51.98%	Maxime Claveau; 6,182; 12.18%	Danny Polifroni; 1,443; 2.84%	Peter Macrisopoulos; 142; 0.28%	Beverly Bernardo (NA) (Note: Bernardo was a candidate for the Communist League, which is not a registered political party and ineligible to be listed on the ballot. Being listed as No Affiliation means that she left the party affiliation section of her candidate registration empty.); 103 0.20%	**Justin Trudeau**
Papineau	Yvon Vadnais; 2,390; 4.71%	Anne Lagacé Dowson; 13,132; 25.87%	**Justin Trudeau**; 26,391; 51.98%	Maxime Claveau; 6,182; 12.18%	Danny Polifroni; 1,443; 2.84%	Peter Macrisopoulos; 142; 0.28%	Tommy Gaudet (Rhino.); 323 0.64%	**Justin Trudeau**
Papineau	Yvon Vadnais; 2,390; 4.71%	Anne Lagacé Dowson; 13,132; 25.87%	**Justin Trudeau**; 26,391; 51.98%	Maxime Claveau; 6,182; 12.18%	Danny Polifroni; 1,443; 2.84%	Peter Macrisopoulos; 142; 0.28%	Chris Lloyd (Ind.); 505 0.99%	**Justin Trudeau**
Papineau	Yvon Vadnais; 2,390; 4.71%	Anne Lagacé Dowson; 13,132; 25.87%	**Justin Trudeau**; 26,391; 51.98%	Maxime Claveau; 6,182; 12.18%	Danny Polifroni; 1,443; 2.84%	Peter Macrisopoulos; 142; 0.28%	Kim Waldron (Ind.); 159 0.31%	**Justin Trudeau**
Saint-Léonard—Saint-Michel	Jean Philippe Fournier; 4,957; 11.13%	Rosannie Filato; 6,611; 14.85%	Nicola Di Iorio; 28,826; 64.73%	Steeve Gendron; 3,204; 7.19%	Melissa Miscione; 805; 1.81%	Arezki Malek; 128; 0.29%		Massimo Pacetti (Note: Excluded from Liberal caucus on 5 November 2014. Sat as an Independent until end of legislature.)
Vimy	Anthony Mavros; 7,262; 13.36%	France Duhamel; 11,391; 20.96%	Eva Nassif; 25,082; 46.15%	Barek Kaddouri; 9,068; 16.69%	José Núñez Melo; 1,280; 2.36%		Brian Jenkins (CHP); 260; 0.48%	José Núñez Melo (Note: Sat as NDP at dissolution; joined GPC after writ was issued.); Laval

=== Laurentides, Outaouais and Northern Quebec ===
Electoral district	Candidates						Incumbent
Electoral district	Conservative	NDP	Liberal	BQ	Green	Other	Incumbent
Abitibi—Baie-James— Nunavik—Eeyou	Steven Hébert; 3,211; 9.30%	Romeo Saganash; 12,778; 37.02%	Pierre Dufour; 11,094; 32.14%	Luc Ferland; 6,398; 18.54%	Patrick Benoît; 779; 2.26%	Mario Gagnon (Rhino.); 258; 0.75%	Romeo Saganash
Abitibi—Témiscamingue	Benoit Fortin; 3,425; 6.89%	Christine Moore; 20,636; 41.50%	Claude Thibault; 14,733; 29.63%	Yvon Moreau; 9,651; 19.41%	Aline Bégin; 859; 1.73%	Pascal Le Fou Gélinas (Rhino.); 425; 0.85%	Christine Moore
Argenteuil—La Petite-Nation	Maxime Hupé-Labelle; 5,680; 11.12%	Chantal Crête; 12,650; 24.77%	Stéphane Lauzon; 22,093; 43.26%	Jonathan Beauchamp; 9,525; 18.65%	Audrey Lamarche; 1,118; 2.19%		Mylène Freeman‡ Argenteuil—Papineau—Mirabel
Gatineau	Luc Angers; 4,733; 8.19%	Françoise Boivin; 15,352; 26.56%	Steven MacKinnon; 31,076; 53.76%	Philippe Boily; 5,455; 9.44%	Guy Dostaler; 942; 1.63%	Guy J Bellavance (Ind.); 148 0.26%	Françoise Boivin
Gatineau	Luc Angers; 4,733; 8.19%	Françoise Boivin; 15,352; 26.56%	Steven MacKinnon; 31,076; 53.76%	Philippe Boily; 5,455; 9.44%	Guy Dostaler; 942; 1.63%	Pierre Soublière (M-L); 94 0.16%	Françoise Boivin
Hull—Aylmer	Étienne Boulrice; 4,278; 7.72%	Nycole Turmel; 17,472; 31.52%	Greg Fergus; 28,478; 51.37%	Maude Chouinard-Boucher; 3,625; 6.54%	Roger Fleury; 1,035; 1.87%	Luc Desjardins (Ind.); 160 0.29%	Nycole Turmel
Hull—Aylmer	Étienne Boulrice; 4,278; 7.72%	Nycole Turmel; 17,472; 31.52%	Greg Fergus; 28,478; 51.37%	Maude Chouinard-Boucher; 3,625; 6.54%	Roger Fleury; 1,035; 1.87%	Gabriel Girard-Bernier (M-L); 101 0.18%	Nycole Turmel
Hull—Aylmer	Étienne Boulrice; 4,278; 7.72%	Nycole Turmel; 17,472; 31.52%	Greg Fergus; 28,478; 51.37%	Maude Chouinard-Boucher; 3,625; 6.54%	Roger Fleury; 1,035; 1.87%	Sean J. Mulligan (CHP); 291 0.52%	Nycole Turmel
Laurentides—Labelle	Sylvain Charron; 6,209; 9.83%	Simon-Pierre Landry; 16,644; 26.35%	David Graham; 20,277; 32.10%	Johanne Régimbald; 18,792; 29.75%	Niloufar Hedjazi; 1,251; 1.98%		Marc-André Morin§
Mirabel	Gordon Ferguson; 6,020; 10.13%	Mylène Freeman; 17,873; 30.08%	Karl Trudel; 15,514; 26.11%	Simon Marcil; 18,710; 31.49%	Jocelyn Gifford; 1,301; 2.19%		New District
Pontiac	Benjamin Woodman; 8,716; 13.92%	Mathieu Ravignat; 14,090; 22.50%	William Amos; 34,154; 54.54%	Nicolas Lepage; 4,337; 6.93%	Colin Griffiths; 1,089; 1.74%	Louis Lang (M-L); 108 0.17%	Mathieu Ravignat
Pontiac	Benjamin Woodman; 8,716; 13.92%	Mathieu Ravignat; 14,090; 22.50%	William Amos; 34,154; 54.54%	Nicolas Lepage; 4,337; 6.93%	Colin Griffiths; 1,089; 1.74%	Pascal Médieu (SD); 131 0.21%	Mathieu Ravignat
Rivière-des-Mille-Îles	Érick Gauthier; 6,099; 10.51%	Laurin Liu; 17,111; 29.48%	Linda Lapointe; 18,787; 32.37%	Félix Pinel; 14,755; 25.42%	Alec Ware; 1,136; 1.96%	Luis Quinteros (Ind.); 158; 0.27%	Laurin Liu
Rivière-du-Nord	Romain Vignol; 4,793; 8.46%	Pierre Dionne Labelle; 17,077; 30.14%	Janice Bélair Rolland; 14,933; 26.36%	Rhéal Fortin; 18,157; 32.05%	Joey Leckman; 1,436; 2.53%	Fobozof A. Côté (Rhino.); 261; 0.46%	Pierre Dionne Labelle
Terrebonne	Michel Surprenant; 6,615; 11.35%	Charmaine Borg; 14,928; 25.61%	Michèle Audette; 16,316; 27.99%	Michel Boudrias; 19,238; 33.01%	Susan Moen; 1,016; 1.74%	Louis Clément Sénat (SD); 171; 0.29%	Charmaine Borg; Terrebonne—Blainville
Thérèse-De Blainville	Manuel Puga; 7,000; 12.44%	Alain Giguère; 14,022; 24.93%	Ramez Ayoub; 18,281; 32.50%	Alain Marginean; 15,238; 27.09%	Andrew Carkner; 1,352; 2.40%	Daniel Guindon (Libert.); 355; 0.63%	New District

== Ontario ==
=== Ottawa ===
Electoral district	Candidates					Incumbent
Electoral district	Conservative	NDP	Liberal	Green	Other	Incumbent
Carleton	Pierre Poilievre; 27,762; 46.86%	Kc Larocque; 3,632; 6.13%	Chris Rodgers; 25,913; 43.74%	Deborah Coyne; 1,932; 3.26%		New District
Kanata—Carleton	Walter Pamic; 24,829; 39.21%	John Hansen; 4,313; 6.81%	Karen McCrimmon; 32,477; 51.29%	Andrew West; 1,704; 2.69%		Gordon O'Connor†; Carleton—Mississippi Mills
Nepean	Andy Wang; 23,442; 36.13%	Sean Devine; 5,324; 8.20%	Chandra Arya; 34,017; 52.42%	Jean-Luc Roger Cooke; 1,513; 2.33%	Jesus Cosico (Ind.); 416 0.64%	Pierre Poilievre‡ Nepean—Carleton
Nepean	Andy Wang; 23,442; 36.13%	Sean Devine; 5,324; 8.20%	Chandra Arya; 34,017; 52.42%	Jean-Luc Roger Cooke; 1,513; 2.33%	Hubert Mamba (Ind.); 69 0.11%	Pierre Poilievre‡ Nepean—Carleton
Nepean	Andy Wang; 23,442; 36.13%	Sean Devine; 5,324; 8.20%	Chandra Arya; 34,017; 52.42%	Jean-Luc Roger Cooke; 1,513; 2.33%	Tony Seed (M-L); 41 0.06%	Pierre Poilievre‡ Nepean—Carleton
Nepean	Andy Wang; 23,442; 36.13%	Sean Devine; 5,324; 8.20%	Chandra Arya; 34,017; 52.42%	Jean-Luc Roger Cooke; 1,513; 2.33%	Harry Splett (Ind.); 66 0.10%	Pierre Poilievre‡ Nepean—Carleton
Orléans	Royal Galipeau; 23,821; 30.54%	Nancy Tremblay; 6,215; 7.97%	Andrew Leslie; 46,542; 59.68%	Raphaël Morin; 1,410; 1.81%		Royal Galipeau; Ottawa—Orléans
Ottawa Centre	Damian Konstantinakos; 10,943; 14.49%	Paul Dewar; 29,098; 38.54%	Catherine McKenna; 32,211; 42.66%	Tom Milroy; 2,246; 2.97%	John Andrew Omowole Akpata (Mar.); 160 0.21%	Paul Dewar
Ottawa Centre	Damian Konstantinakos; 10,943; 14.49%	Paul Dewar; 29,098; 38.54%	Catherine McKenna; 32,211; 42.66%	Tom Milroy; 2,246; 2.97%	Dean T. Harris (Libert.); 551 0.73%	Paul Dewar
Ottawa Centre	Damian Konstantinakos; 10,943; 14.49%	Paul Dewar; 29,098; 38.54%	Catherine McKenna; 32,211; 42.66%	Tom Milroy; 2,246; 2.97%	Conrad Lukawski (Rhino.); 167 0.22%	Paul Dewar
Ottawa Centre	Damian Konstantinakos; 10,943; 14.49%	Paul Dewar; 29,098; 38.54%	Catherine McKenna; 32,211; 42.66%	Tom Milroy; 2,246; 2.97%	Stuart Ryan (Comm.); 124 0.16%	Paul Dewar
Ottawa South	Dev Balkissoon; 15,711; 24.30%	George Brown; 7,480; 11.57%	David McGuinty; 38,831; 60.06%	John Redins; 1,888; 2.92%	Al Gullon (PC); 366 0.57%	David McGuinty
Ottawa South	Dev Balkissoon; 15,711; 24.30%	George Brown; 7,480; 11.57%	David McGuinty; 38,831; 60.06%	John Redins; 1,888; 2.92%	Larry Wasslen (Comm.); 136 0.21%	David McGuinty
Ottawa South	Dev Balkissoon; 15,711; 24.30%	George Brown; 7,480; 11.57%	David McGuinty; 38,831; 60.06%	John Redins; 1,888; 2.92%	Damien Wilson (Libert.); 237 0.37%	David McGuinty
Ottawa—Vanier	David Piccini; 12,109; 19.11%	Emilie Taman; 12,194; 19.25%	Mauril Bélanger; 36,474; 57.57%	Nira Dookeran; 1,947; 3.07%	Coreen Corcoran (Libert.); 503 0.79%	Mauril Bélanger
Ottawa—Vanier	David Piccini; 12,109; 19.11%	Emilie Taman; 12,194; 19.25%	Mauril Bélanger; 36,474; 57.57%	Nira Dookeran; 1,947; 3.07%	Christian Legeais (M-L); 128 0.20%	Mauril Bélanger
Ottawa West—Nepean	Abdul Abdi; 18,893; 30.03%	Marlene Rivier; 6,195; 9.85%	Anita Vandenbeld; 35,199; 55.95%	Mark Brooks; 1,772; 2.82%	Sam Heaton (M-L); 114 0.18%	Vacant
Ottawa West—Nepean	Abdul Abdi; 18,893; 30.03%	Marlene Rivier; 6,195; 9.85%	Anita Vandenbeld; 35,199; 55.95%	Mark Brooks; 1,772; 2.82%	**Rod Taylor** (CHP); 740 1.18%	Vacant

=== Eastern Ontario ===
Electoral district	Candidates					Incumbent
Electoral district	Conservative	NDP	Liberal	Green	Other	Incumbent
Bay of Quinte	Jodie Jenkins; 19,781; 34.27%	Terry Cassidy; 7,001; 12.13%	Neil Ellis; 29,281; 50.74%	Rachel Nelems; 1,278; 2.21%	Trueman Tuck (Ind.); 372; 0.64%	Daryl Kramp‡ Prince Edward—Hastings
Glengarry—Prescott— Russell	Pierre Lemieux; 23,367; 36.41%	Normand Laurin; 5,087; 7.93%	Francis Drouin; 34,189; 53.28%	Genevieve Malouin-Diraddo; 1,153; 1.80%	Jean-Serge Brisson (Libert.); 377; 0.59%	Pierre Lemieux
Hastings— Lennox and Addington	Daryl Kramp; 20,879; 41.93%	Betty Bannon; 6,348; 12.75%	Mike Bossio; 21,104; 42.38%	Cam Mather; 1,466; 2.94%		New District
Kingston and the Islands	Andy Brooke; 14,928; 22.70%	Daniel Beals; 11,185; 17.01%	Mark Gerretsen; 36,421; 55.37%	Nathan Townend; 2,933; 4.46%	Luke McAllister (Libert.); 305; 0.46%	Ted Hsu†
Lanark—Frontenac—Kingston	Scott Reid; 27,399; 47.87%	John Fenik; 8,073; 14.10%	Phil Archambault; 19,325; 33.76%	Anita Payne; 2,025; 3.54%	Mark Budd (Libert.); 418; 0.73%	Scott Reid; Lanark—Frontenac—Lennox and Addington
Leeds—Grenville—Thousand Islands and Rideau Lakes	Gord Brown; 26,738; 47.38%	Margaret Andrade; 4,722; 8.37%	Mary Jean McFall; 22,888; 40.56%	Lorraine A. Rekmans; 2,088; 3.70%		Gord Brown; Leeds—Grenville
Renfrew—Nipissing— Pembroke	Cheryl Gallant; 26,195; 45.83%	Dan McCarthy; 4,893; 8.56%	Jeff Lehoux; 18,666; 32.66%	Stefan Klietsch; 1,105; 1.93%	Hector Clouthier (Ind.); 6,300; 11.02%	Cheryl Gallant
Stormont—Dundas— South Glengarry	Guy Lauzon; 27,091; 51.05%	Patrick Burger; 4,332; 8.16%	Bernadette Clement; 20,452; 38.54%	Elaine Kennedy; 1,191; 2.24%		Guy Lauzon

=== Central Ontario ===
Electoral district	Candidates					Incumbent
Electoral district	Conservative	NDP	Liberal	Green	Other	Incumbent
Barrie—Innisfil	John Brassard; 22,901; 46.41%	Myrna Clark; 5,812; 11.78%	Colin Wilson; 18,308; 37.11%	Bonnie North; 1,991; 4.04%	Gary Nail (CHP); 199 0.40%	Vacant; Barrie
Barrie—Innisfil	John Brassard; 22,901; 46.41%	Myrna Clark; 5,812; 11.78%	Colin Wilson; 18,308; 37.11%	Bonnie North; 1,991; 4.04%	Jeff Sakula (CAP); 130 0.26%	Vacant; Barrie
Barrie—Springwater—Oro-Medonte (judicial recount)	Alex Nuttall; 21,091; 41.74%	Ellen White; 5,202; 10.29%	Brian Tamblyn; 21,005; 41.57%	Marty Lancaster; 2,648; 5.24%	Ram Faerber (Ind.); 188 0.37%	New district
Barrie—Springwater—Oro-Medonte (judicial recount)	Alex Nuttall; 21,091; 41.74%	Ellen White; 5,202; 10.29%	Brian Tamblyn; 21,005; 41.57%	Marty Lancaster; 2,648; 5.24%	Darren Roskam (Libert.); 401 0.79%	New district
Bruce—Grey—Owen Sound	Larry Miller; 26,297; 46.68%	David McLaren; 6,270; 11.13%	Kimberley Love; 21,879; 38.84%	Chris Albinati; 1,887; 3.35%		Larry Miller
Dufferin—Caledon	David Allan Tilson; 27,977; 46.28%	Rehya Yazbek; 4,398; 7.28%	Ed Crewson; 23,643; 39.11%	Nancy Urekar; 4,433; 7.33%		David Tilson
Durham	Erin O'Toole; 28,967; 45.13%	Derek Spence; 10,289; 16.03%	Corinna Traill; 22,949; 35.75%	Stacey Leadbetter; 1,616; 2.52%	Andrew Moriarity (CHP); 364; 0.57%	Erin O'Toole
Haliburton— Kawartha Lakes—Brock	Jamie Schmale; 27,718; 44.83%	Mike Perry; 12,012; 19.43%	David Marquis; 19,634; 31.75%	Bill MacCallum; 2,470; 3.99%		Barry Devolin†
Newmarket—Aurora	Lois Brown; 24,057; 42.61%	Yvonne Kelly; 4,806; 8.51%	Kyle Peterson; 25,508; 45.18%	Vanessa Long; 1,331; 2.36%	Dorian Baxter (PC); 762; 1.35%	Lois Brown
Northumberland—Peterborough South	Adam Moulton; 25,165; 39.56%	Russ Christianson; 9,411; 14.80%	Kim Rudd; 27,043; 42.51%	Patricia Sinnott; 1,990; 3.13%		Rick Norlock†; Northumberland—Quinte West
Peterborough—Kawartha	Michael Skinner; 23,335; 35.07%	Dave Nickle; 12,437; 18.69%	Maryam Monsef; 29,159; 43.82%	Doug Mason; 1,480; 2.22%	Toban Leckie (SD); 131; 0.20%	Vacant; Peterborough
Simcoe—Grey	Kellie Leitch; 30,612; 46.56%	David Matthews; 6,332; 9.63%	Mike MacEachern; 25,352; 38.56%	JoAnne Fleming; 2,923; 4.45%	Len Noordegraaf (CHP); 528; 0.80%	Kellie Leitch
Simcoe North	Bruce Stanton; 24,836; 43.52%	Richard Banigan; 6,037; 10.58%	Liz Riley; 22,718; 39.81%	Peter Stubbins; 2,543; 4.46%	Jacob Kearey-Moreland (NA) (Note: Jacob Kearey-Moreland described himself as a Cooperative Interdependence candidate.); 618 1.08%	Bruce Stanton
Simcoe North	Bruce Stanton; 24,836; 43.52%	Richard Banigan; 6,037; 10.58%	Liz Riley; 22,718; 39.81%	Peter Stubbins; 2,543; 4.46%	Scott Whittaker (CHP); 319 0.56%	Bruce Stanton
York—Simcoe	Peter Van Loan; 24,058; 50.25%	Sylvia Gerl; 4,255; 8.89%	Shaun Tanaka; 18,083; 37.77%	Mark Viitala; 1,483; 3.10%		Peter Van Loan

=== Southern Durham and York ===
Electoral district	Candidates					Incumbent
Electoral district	Conservative	NDP	Liberal	Green	Other	Incumbent
Ajax	Chris Alexander; 19,374; 34.41%	Stephanie Brown; 4,630; 8.22%	Mark Holland; 31,458; 55.87%	Jeff Hill; 788; 1.40%	**Bob Kesic** (United); 57; 0.10%	Chris Alexander; Ajax—Pickering
Aurora—Oak Ridges— Richmond Hill	Costas Menegakis; 23,039; 45.19%	Brenda Power; 2,912; 5.71%	Leona Alleslev; 24,132; 47.34%	Randi Ramdeen; 654; 1.28%	Kyle Bowles (Animal All.); 243; 0.48%	New District
King—Vaughan	Konstantin Toubis; 24,170; 44.20%	Natalie Rizzo; 3,571; 6.53%	Deb Schulte; 25,908; 47.38%	Ann Raney; 1,037; 1.90%		New District
Markham—Stouffville	Paul Calandra; 25,565; 42.77%	Gregory Hines; 3,647; 6.10%	Jane Philpott; 29,416; 49.21%	Myles O'Brien; 1,145; 1.92%		Paul Calandra; Oak Ridges—Markham
Markham—Thornhill	Jobson Easow; 13,849; 32.31%	Senthi Chelliah; 4,595; 10.72%	John McCallum; 23,878; 55.72%	Joshua Russell; 535; 1.25%		New District
Markham—Unionville	Bob Saroya; 24,605; 49.37%	Colleen Zimmerman; 2,528; 5.07%	Bang-Gu Jiang; 21,596; 43.33%	Elvin Kao; 1,110; 2.23%		John McCallum‡
Oshawa	Colin Carrie; 23,162; 38.17%	Mary Fowler; 19,339; 31.87%	Tito-Dante Marimpietri; 16,588; 27.33%	Michael Dempsey; 1,522; 2.51%	David Gershuny (M-L); 75; 0.12%	Colin Carrie
Pickering—Uxbridge	Corneliu Chisu; 22,591; 38.19%	Pamela Downward; 5,446; 9.21%	Jennifer O'Connell; 29,757; 50.30%	Anthony Jordan Navarro; 1,365; 2.31%		Corneliu Chisu; Pickering—Scarborough East
Richmond Hill	Michael Parsa; 21,275; 43.32%	Adam DeVita; 3,950; 8.04%	Majid Jowhari; 23,032; 46.90%	Gwendolyn Veenema; 856; 1.74%		Costas Menegakis‡
Thornhill	Peter Kent; 31,911; 58.56%	Lorne Cherry; 2,814; 5.16%	Nancy Coldham; 18,395; 33.76%	Josh Rachlis; 627; 1.15%	Gene Balfour (Libert.); 587 1.08%	Peter Kent
Thornhill	Peter Kent; 31,911; 58.56%	Lorne Cherry; 2,814; 5.16%	Nancy Coldham; 18,395; 33.76%	Josh Rachlis; 627; 1.15%	Margaret Leigh Fairbairn (Seniors); 157 0.29%	Peter Kent
Vaughan—Woodbridge	Julian Fantino; 20,746; 43.86%	Adriana Marie Zichy; 2,198; 4.65%	Francesco Sorbara; 23,041; 48.71%	Elise Boulanger; 597; 1.26%	Anthony Gualtieri (Libert.); 716; 1.51%	Julian Fantino; Vaughan
Whitby	Pat Perkins; 27,154; 42.09%	Ryan Kelly; 6,677; 10.35%	Celina Caesar-Chavannes; 29,003; 44.95%	Craig Cameron; 1,403; 2.17%	Jon O'Connor (Ind.); 279; 0.43%	Pat Perkins; Whitby—Oshawa

=== Suburban Toronto ===
Electoral district	Candidates					Incumbent
Electoral district	Conservative	NDP	Liberal	Green	Other	Incumbent
Don Valley East	Maureen Harquail; 12,155; 29.23%	Khalid Ahmed; 4,307; 10.36%	Yasmin Ratansi; 24,048; 57.82%	Laura Elizabeth Sanderson; 1,078; 2.59%		Joe Daniel‡
Don Valley North	Joe Daniel; 17,279; 37.82%	Akil Sadikali; 3,896; 8.53%	Geng Tan; 23,494; 51.42%	Caroline Brown; 1,018; 2.23%		New District
Etobicoke Centre	Ted Opitz; 23,070; 37.33%	Tanya De Mello; 4,886; 7.91%	Borys Wrzesnewskyj; 32,612; 52.77%	Shawn Rizvi; 856; 1.39%	Rob Wolvin (PC); 378; 0.61%	Ted Opitz
Etobicoke—Lakeshore	Bernard Trottier; 20,932; 32.45%	Phil Trotter; 7,030; 10.90%	James Maloney; 34,638; 53.70%	Angela Salewsky; 1,507; 2.34%	Janice Murray (M-L); 168 0.26%	Bernard Trottier
Etobicoke—Lakeshore	Bernard Trottier; 20,932; 32.45%	Phil Trotter; 7,030; 10.90%	James Maloney; 34,638; 53.70%	Angela Salewsky; 1,507; 2.34%	**Liz White** (Animal All.); 233 0.36%	Bernard Trottier
Etobicoke North	Toyin Dada; 9,673; 23.00%	Faisal Hassan; 5,220; 12.41%	Kirsty Duncan; 26,251; 62.41%	Akhtar Ayub; 524; 1.25%	**Anna Di Carlo** (M-L); 232 0.55%	Kirsty Duncan
Etobicoke North	Toyin Dada; 9,673; 23.00%	Faisal Hassan; 5,220; 12.41%	Kirsty Duncan; 26,251; 62.41%	Akhtar Ayub; 524; 1.25%	George Szebik (NA); 164 0.39%	Kirsty Duncan
Humber River—Black Creek	Kerry Vandenberg; 7,228; 20.16%	Darnel Harris; 3,851; 10.74%	Judy Sgro; 23,995; 66.91%	Keith Jarrett; 584; 1.63%	Christine Nugent (M-L); 201; 0.56%	Judy Sgro; York West
Scarborough—Agincourt	Bin Chang; 15,802; 38.03%	Laura Patrick; 3,263; 7.85%	Arnold Chan; 21,587; 51.95%	Debra Scott; 570; 1.37%	Jude Coutinho (CHP); 334; 0.80%	Arnold Chan
Scarborough Centre	Roxanne James; 14,705; 32.66%	Alex Wilson; 5,227; 11.61%	Salma Zahid; 22,753; 50.53%	Lindsay Thompson; 960; 2.13%	Katerina Androutsos (Libert.); 1,384; 3.07%	Roxanne James
Scarborough-Guildwood	Chuck Konkel; 11,108; 26.50%	Laura Casselman; 4,720; 11.26%	John McKay; 25,167; 60.04%	Kathleen Holding; 606; 1.45%	Kevin Clarke (Ind.); 175 0.42%	John McKay
Scarborough-Guildwood	Chuck Konkel; 11,108; 26.50%	Laura Casselman; 4,720; 11.26%	John McKay; 25,167; 60.04%	Kathleen Holding; 606; 1.45%	Paul Coulbeck (Mar.); 141 0.34%	John McKay
Scarborough North	Ravinder Malhi; 10,737; 27.40%	Rathika Sitsabaiesan; 8,648; 22.07%	Shaun Chen; 18,904; 48.24%	Eleni MacDonald; 579; 1.48%	Aasia Khatoon (Ind.); 156 0.40%	Rathika Sitsabaiesan; Scarborough—Rouge River
Scarborough North	Ravinder Malhi; 10,737; 27.40%	Rathika Sitsabaiesan; 8,648; 22.07%	Shaun Chen; 18,904; 48.24%	Eleni MacDonald; 579; 1.48%	Raphael Rosch (Ind.); 164 0.42%	Rathika Sitsabaiesan; Scarborough—Rouge River
Scarborough— Rouge Park	Leslyn Lewis; 13,587; 27.36%	KM Shanthikumar; 5,145; 10.36%	Gary Anandasangaree; 29,913; 60.24%	Calvin Winter; 1,010; 2.03%		New District
Scarborough Southwest	Roshan Nallaratnam; 10,347; 21.22%	Dan Harris; 11,574; 23.73%	Bill Blair; 25,586; 52.47%	Tommy Taylor; 1,259; 2.58%		Dan Harris
Willowdale	Chungsen Leung; 16,990; 36.97%	Pouyan Tabasinejad; 3,203; 6.97%	Ali Ehsassi; 24,519; 53.36%	James Arruda; 1,025; 2.23%	Birinder Singh Ahluwalia (Ind.); 216; 0.47%	Chungsen Leung
York Centre	Mark Adler; 18,893; 43.99%	Hal Berman; 3,148; 7.33%	Michael Levitt; 20,131; 46.88%	Constantine Kritsonis; 772; 1.80%		Mark Adler

=== Central Toronto ===
Electoral district	Candidates							Incumbent
Electoral district	Conservative	NDP	Liberal	Green	Libertarian	Marxist-Leninist	Other	Incumbent
Beaches—East York	Bill Burrows; 9,124; 16.43%	Matthew Kellway; 17,113; 30.82%	Nathaniel Erskine-Smith; 27,458; 49.45%	Randall Sach; 1,433; 2.58%		Roger Carter; 105; 0.19%	James Sears (Ind.) (Note: Sears is the leader of The New Constitution Party of Canada which was ineligible to be on the ballot; he chose to be listed as an Independent.); 254 0.46%	Matthew Kellway
Beaches—East York	Bill Burrows; 9,124; 16.43%	Matthew Kellway; 17,113; 30.82%	Nathaniel Erskine-Smith; 27,458; 49.45%	Randall Sach; 1,433; 2.58%		Roger Carter; 105; 0.19%	Peter Surjanac (Ind.); 43 0.08%	Matthew Kellway
Davenport	Carlos Oliveira; 5,233; 10.55%	Andrew Cash; 20,506; 41.36%	Julie Dzerowicz; 21,947; 44.26%	Dan Stein; 1,530; 3.09%			**Miguel Figueroa** (Comm.); 261 0.53%	Andrew Cash
Davenport	Carlos Oliveira; 5,233; 10.55%	Andrew Cash; 20,506; 41.36%	Julie Dzerowicz; 21,947; 44.26%	Dan Stein; 1,530; 3.09%			Chai Kalevar (Ind.); 107 0.22%	Andrew Cash
Don Valley West	John Carmichael; 19,206; 37.60%	Syeda Riaz; 3,076; 6.02%	Rob Oliphant; 27,472; 53.78%	Natalie Hunt; 848; 1.66%	John Kittredge; 325; 0.64%		Sharon Cromwell (Ind.); 75 0.15%	John Carmichael
Don Valley West	John Carmichael; 19,206; 37.60%	Syeda Riaz; 3,076; 6.02%	Rob Oliphant; 27,472; 53.78%	Natalie Hunt; 848; 1.66%	John Kittredge; 325; 0.64%		Elizabeth Hill (Comm.); 84 0.16%	John Carmichael
Eglinton—Lawrence	Joe Oliver; 23,788; 42.64%	Andrew Thomson; 3,505; 6.28%	Marco Mendicino; 27,278; 48.89%	Matthew Chisholm; 799; 1.43%	Ethan Buchman; 308; 0.55%		Rudy Brunell Solomonovici (Animal All.); 114; 0.20%	Joe Oliver
Parkdale—High Park	Ian Allen; 7,641; 13.05%	Peggy Nash; 23,566; 40.24%	Arif Virani; 24,623; 42.04%	Adam Phipps; 1,743; 2.98%	Mark Jeftovic; 610; 1.04%	Lorne Gershuny; 100; 0.17%	Terry Parker (Mar.); 191 0.33%	Peggy Nash
Parkdale—High Park	Ian Allen; 7,641; 13.05%	Peggy Nash; 23,566; 40.24%	Arif Virani; 24,623; 42.04%	Adam Phipps; 1,743; 2.98%	Mark Jeftovic; 610; 1.04%	Lorne Gershuny; 100; 0.17%	Carol Royer (Ind.); 93 0.16%	Peggy Nash
Spadina—Fort York	Sabrina Zuniga; 8,673; 15.73%	Olivia Chow; 15,047; 27.28%	Adam Vaughan; 30,141; 54.65%	Sharon Danley; 1,137; 2.06%		Nick Lin; 59; 0.11%	**Michael Nicula** (PACT); 91; 0.17%	Adam Vaughan; Trinity—Spadina
Toronto Centre	Julian Di Battista; 6,167; 12.19%	Linda McQuaig; 13,467; 26.61%	Bill Morneau; 29,297; 57.90%	Colin Biggin; 1,315; 2.60%		Philip Fernandez; 76; 0.15%	Mariam Ahmad (Comm.); 133 0.26%	Chrystia Freeland‡
Toronto Centre	Julian Di Battista; 6,167; 12.19%	Linda McQuaig; 13,467; 26.61%	Bill Morneau; 29,297; 57.90%	Colin Biggin; 1,315; 2.60%		Philip Fernandez; 76; 0.15%	Jordan Stone (Ind.); 147 0.29%	Chrystia Freeland‡
Toronto—Danforth	Benjamin Dichter; 5,478; 9.86%	Craig Scott; 22,325; 40.17%	Julie Dabrusin; 23,531; 42.34%	Chris Tolley; 2,618; 4.71%			Elizabeth Abbott (Animal All.); 354 0.64%	Craig Scott
Toronto—Danforth	Benjamin Dichter; 5,478; 9.86%	Craig Scott; 22,325; 40.17%	Julie Dabrusin; 23,531; 42.34%	Chris Tolley; 2,618; 4.71%			John Richardson (PC); 1,275 2.29%	Craig Scott
Toronto—St. Paul's	Marnie MacDougall; 15,376; 26.99%	Noah Richler; 8,386; 14.72%	Carolyn Bennett; 31,481; 55.26%	Kevin Farmer; 1,729; 3.03%				Carolyn Bennett; St. Paul's
University—Rosedale	Karim Jivraj; 9,790; 17.51%	Jennifer Hollett; 15,988; 28.59%	Chrystia Freeland; 27,849; 49.80%	Nick Wright; 1,641; 2.93%	Jesse Waslowski; 233; 0.42%	Steve Rutchinski; 51; 0.09%	**David Berlin** (TBP); 122 0.22%	New District
University—Rosedale	Karim Jivraj; 9,790; 17.51%	Jennifer Hollett; 15,988; 28.59%	Chrystia Freeland; 27,849; 49.80%	Nick Wright; 1,641; 2.93%	Jesse Waslowski; 233; 0.42%	Steve Rutchinski; 51; 0.09%	Drew Garvie (Comm.); 125 0.22%	New District
University—Rosedale	Karim Jivraj; 9,790; 17.51%	Jennifer Hollett; 15,988; 28.59%	Chrystia Freeland; 27,849; 49.80%	Nick Wright; 1,641; 2.93%	Jesse Waslowski; 233; 0.42%	Steve Rutchinski; 51; 0.09%	Simon Luisi (Animal All.); 126 0.23%	New District
York South—Weston	James Robinson; 8,399; 19.22%	Mike Sullivan; 13,281; 30.39%	Ahmed Hussen; 20,093; 45.97%	John Johnson; 892; 2.04%	Stephen Lepone; 1,041; 2.38%			Mike Sullivan

=== Brampton, Mississauga and Oakville ===
Electoral district	Candidates					Incumbent
Electoral district	Conservative	NDP	Liberal	Green	Other	Incumbent
Brampton Centre	Bal Gosal; 13,345; 33.67%	Rosemary Keenan; 5,993; 15.12%	Ramesh Sangha; 19,277; 48.64%	Saul Marquard T. Bottcher; 844; 2.13%	Frank Chilelli (M-L); 173; 0.44%	New District
Brampton East	Naval Bajaj; 10,642; 23.54%	Harbaljit Singh Kahlon; 10,400; 23.01%	Raj Grewal; 23,652; 52.32%	Kyle Lacroix; 512; 1.13%		Bal Gosal‡ Bramalea—Gore—Malton
Brampton North	Parm Gill; 15,888; 32.99%	Martin Singh; 7,946; 16.50%	Ruby Sahota; 23,297; 48.37%	Pauline Thornham; 915; 1.90%	Harinderpal Hundal (Comm.); 120; 0.25%	Parm Gill; Brampton—Springdale
Brampton South	Kyle Seeback; 15,929; 35.04%	Amarjit Sangha; 4,843; 10.65%	Sonia Sidhu; 23,681; 52.09%	Shaun Hatton; 1,011; 2.22%		New District
Brampton West	Ninder Thind; 13,068; 30.11%	Adaoma Patterson; 5,400; 12.44%	Kamal Khera; 24,256; 55.89%	Karthika Gobinath; 674; 1.55%		Kyle Seeback‡
Mississauga Centre	Julius Tiangson; 17,431; 33.62%	Farheen Khan; 4,920; 9.49%	Omar Alghabra; 28,372; 54.72%	Linh Nguyen; 1,129; 2.18%		New District
Mississauga East—Cooksville	Wladyslaw Lizon; 18,353; 35.35%	Ali Naqvi; 4,481; 8.63%	Peter Fonseca; 28,154; 54.23%	Jaymini Bhikha; 766; 1.48%	Tim Sullivan (M-L); 163; 0.31%	Wladyslaw Lizon
Mississauga—Erin Mills	Bob Dechert; 21,716; 39.24%	Michelle Bilek; 5,206; 9.41%	Iqra Khalid; 27,520; 49.72%	Andrew Roblin; 905; 1.64%		Bob Dechert; Mississauga—Erindale
Mississauga—Lakeshore	Stella Ambler; 24,435; 41.22%	Eric Guerbilsky; 4,735; 7.99%	Sven Spengemann; 28,279; 47.71%	Ariana Burgener; 1,397; 2.36%	Dagmar Sullivan (M-L); 111 0.19%	Stella Ambler; Mississauga South
Mississauga—Lakeshore	Stella Ambler; 24,435; 41.22%	Eric Guerbilsky; 4,735; 7.99%	Sven Spengemann; 28,279; 47.71%	Ariana Burgener; 1,397; 2.36%	Paul Woodworth (Libert.); 316 0.53%	Stella Ambler; Mississauga South
Mississauga—Malton	Jagdish Grewal (Note: Jagdish Grewal was expelled by the Conservative Party on 6 October; because no changes could be made to the list of confirmed candidates after 28 September, he was still listed as the Conservative candidate on the ballot.); 11,701; 26.44%	Dianne Douglas; 5,450; 12.31%	Navdeep Bains; 26,165; 59.12%	Heather Mercer; 737; 1.67%	Naresh Tharani (Ind.); 203; 0.46%	Eve Adams§ Mississauga—Brampton South
Mississauga—Streetsville	Brad Butt; 22,621; 40.40%	Fayaz Karim; 5,040; 9.00%	Gagan Sikand; 26,792; 47.84%	Chris Hill; 1,293; 2.31%	Yegor Tarazevich (CHP); 253; 0.45%	Brad Butt
Oakville	Terence Young; 27,497; 42.50%	Che Marville; 3,830; 5.92%	John Oliver; 31,956; 49.39%	David Doel; 1,420; 2.19%		Terence Young
Oakville North—Burlington	Effie Triantafilopoulos; 26,342; 43.33%	Janice Best; 4,405; 7.25%	Pam Damoff; 28,415; 46.74%	Adnan Shahbaz; 968; 1.59%	David Clement (Libert.); 666; 1.10%	Lisa Raitt‡ Halton

=== Hamilton, Burlington and Niagara ===
Electoral district	Candidates					Incumbent
Electoral district	Conservative	NDP	Liberal	Green	Other	Incumbent
Burlington	Mike Wallace; 29,780; 42.48%	David Laird; 6,381; 9.10%	Karina Gould; 32,229; 45.98%	Vince Fiorito; 1,710; 2.44%		Mike Wallace
Flamborough—Glanbrook	David Sweet; 24,137; 43.48%	Mike DiLivio; 7,779; 14.01%	Jennifer Stebbing; 21,728; 39.14%	David Allan Urquhart; 1,866; 3.36%		New District
Hamilton Centre	Yonatan Rozenszajn; 6,018; 14.65%	David Christopherson; 18,719; 45.56%	Anne Tennier; 13,718; 33.39%	Ute Schmid-Jones; 1,778; 4.33%	Maria Anastasiou (Ind.); 186 0.45%	David Christopherson
Hamilton Centre	Yonatan Rozenszajn; 6,018; 14.65%	David Christopherson; 18,719; 45.56%	Anne Tennier; 13,718; 33.39%	Ute Schmid-Jones; 1,778; 4.33%	Michael James Baldasaro (Mar.); 348 0.85%	David Christopherson
Hamilton Centre	Yonatan Rozenszajn; 6,018; 14.65%	David Christopherson; 18,719; 45.56%	Anne Tennier; 13,718; 33.39%	Ute Schmid-Jones; 1,778; 4.33%	Rob Young (Libert.); 316 0.77%	David Christopherson
Hamilton East— Stoney Creek	Diane Bubanko; 12,715; 25.26%	Wayne Marston; 16,465; 32.71%	Bob Bratina; 19,622; 38.99%	Erin Davis; 1,305; 2.59%	Wendell Fields (M-L); 55 0.11%	Wayne Marston
Hamilton East— Stoney Creek	Diane Bubanko; 12,715; 25.26%	Wayne Marston; 16,465; 32.71%	Bob Bratina; 19,622; 38.99%	Erin Davis; 1,305; 2.59%	Bob Mann (Comm.); 170 0.34%	Wayne Marston
Hamilton Mountain	Al Miles; 12,991; 25.70%	Scott Duvall; 18,146; 35.89%	Shaun Burt; 16,933; 33.49%	Raheem Aman; 1,283; 2.54%	Andrew James Caton (Libert.); 763 1.51%	Chris Charlton†
Hamilton Mountain	Al Miles; 12,991; 25.70%	Scott Duvall; 18,146; 35.89%	Shaun Burt; 16,933; 33.49%	Raheem Aman; 1,283; 2.54%	Jim Enos (CHP); 438 0.87%	Chris Charlton†
Hamilton West— Ancaster—Dundas	Vincent Samuel; 19,821; 31.83%	Alex Johnstone; 10,131; 16.27%	Filomena Tassi; 29,694; 47.68%	Peter Ormond; 2,633; 4.23%		David Sweet‡ Ancaster—Dundas— Flamborough—Westdale
Milton	Lisa Raitt; 22,378; 45.38%	Alex Anabusi; 5,366; 10.88%	Azim Rizvee; 19,940; 40.44%	Mini Batra; 1,131; 2.29%	Chris Jewell (Libert.); 493; 1.00%	New District
Niagara Centre	Leanna Villella; 16,248; 29.71%	Malcolm Allen; 17,218; 31.49%	Vance Badawey; 19,513; 35.68%	David Clow; 1,316; 2.41%	Jody Di Bartolomeo (Animal All.); 291 0.53%	Malcolm Allen; Welland
Niagara Centre	Leanna Villella; 16,248; 29.71%	Malcolm Allen; 17,218; 31.49%	Vance Badawey; 19,513; 35.68%	David Clow; 1,316; 2.41%	Ron J. Walker (M-L); 96 0.18%	Malcolm Allen; Welland
Niagara Falls	Rob Nicholson; 27,235; 42.09%	Carolynn Ioannoni; 13,525; 20.90%	Ron Planche; 22,318; 34.49%	Steven Soos; 1,633; 2.52%		Rob Nicholson
Niagara West	Dean Allison; 24,732; 48.82%	Nameer Rahman; 5,802; 11.45%	Phil Rose; 16,581; 32.73%	Sid Frere; 1,511; 2.98%	Allan de Roo (Libert.); 797 1.57%	Dean Allison; Niagara West—Glanbrook
Niagara West	Dean Allison; 24,732; 48.82%	Nameer Rahman; 5,802; 11.45%	Phil Rose; 16,581; 32.73%	Sid Frere; 1,511; 2.98%	Harold Jonker (CHP); 1,234 2.44%	Dean Allison; Niagara West—Glanbrook
St. Catharines	Rick Dykstra; 21,637; 37.57%	Susan Erskine-Fournier; 9,511; 16.51%	Chris Bittle; 24,870; 43.18%	Jim Fannon; 1,488; 2.58%	Saleh Waziruddin (Comm.); 85; 0.15%	Rick Dykstra

=== Midwestern Ontario ===
Electoral district	Candidates						Incumbent
Electoral district	Conservative	NDP	Liberal	Green	Libertarian	Other	Incumbent
Brantford—Brant	Phil McColeman; 25,874; 40.89%	Marc Laferriere; 15,715; 24.84%	Danielle Takacs; 19,422; 30.70%	Kevin Brandt; 1,582; 2.50%	Rob Ferguson; 515; 0.81%	The Engineer Turmel (Ind.); 164; 0.26%	Phil McColeman; Brant
Cambridge	Gary Goodyear; 20,613; 38.65%	Bobbi Stewart; 7,397; 13.87%	Bryan May; 23,024; 43.17%	Michele Braniff; 1,723; 3.23%		Manuel Couto (M-L); 108 0.20%	Gary Goodyear
Cambridge	Gary Goodyear; 20,613; 38.65%	Bobbi Stewart; 7,397; 13.87%	Bryan May; 23,024; 43.17%	Michele Braniff; 1,723; 3.23%		Lee Sperduti (Ind.); 474 0.89%	Gary Goodyear
Guelph	Gloria Kovach; 18,407; 26.35%	Andrew Seagram; 8,392; 12.01%	Lloyd Longfield; 34,303; 49.10%	Gord Miller; 7,909; 11.32%	Alexander Fekri; 520; 0.74%	Tristan Dineen (Comm.); 144 0.21%	Frank Valeriote†
Guelph	Gloria Kovach; 18,407; 26.35%	Andrew Seagram; 8,392; 12.01%	Lloyd Longfield; 34,303; 49.10%	Gord Miller; 7,909; 11.32%	Alexander Fekri; 520; 0.74%	Kornelis Klevering (Mar.); 193 0.28%	Frank Valeriote†
Haldimand—Norfolk	Diane Finley; 24,714; 44.14%	John Harris; 7,625; 13.62%	Joan Mouland; 20,487; 36.59%	Wayne Ettinger; 1,857; 3.32%		Leslie Bory (Ind.) (Note: Bory is leader of The Maple Party which was ineligible to be on the ballot; he chose to be listed as an Independent.); 151 0.27%	Diane Finley
Haldimand—Norfolk	Diane Finley; 24,714; 44.14%	John Harris; 7,625; 13.62%	Joan Mouland; 20,487; 36.59%	Wayne Ettinger; 1,857; 3.32%		Dave Bylsma (CHP); 884 1.58%	Diane Finley
Haldimand—Norfolk	Diane Finley; 24,714; 44.14%	John Harris; 7,625; 13.62%	Joan Mouland; 20,487; 36.59%	Wayne Ettinger; 1,857; 3.32%		Dustin Wakeford (Ind.); 272 0.49%	Diane Finley
Huron—Bruce	Ben Lobb; 26,174; 44.94%	Gerard Creces; 7,544; 12.95%	Allan Thompson; 23,129; 39.71%	Jutta Splettstoesser; 1,398; 2.40%			Ben Lobb
Kitchener Centre	Stephen Woodworth; 15,872; 30.36%	Susan Cadell; 8,680; 16.60%	Raj Saini; 25,504; 48.78%	Nicholas Wendler; 1,597; 3.05%	Slavko Miladinovic; 515; 0.99%	Julian Ichim (M-L); 112; 0.21%	Stephen Woodworth
Kitchener—Conestoga	Harold Albrecht; 20,649; 43.29%	James Villeneuve; 4,653; 9.75%	Tim Louis; 20,398; 42.76%	Bob Jonkman; 1,314; 2.75%	Richard Hodgson; 685; 1.44%		Harold Albrecht
Kitchener South—Hespeler	Marian Gagné; 17,544; 36.68%	Lorne Bruce; 7,440; 15.56%	Marwan Tabbara; 20,215; 42.27%	David Weber; 1,767; 3.69%	Nathan Lajeunesse; 772; 1.61%	Elaine Baetz (M-L); 91; 0.19%	New District
Oxford	Dave MacKenzie; 25,966; 45.67%	Zoe Kunschner; 9,406; 16.55%	Don McKay; 18,299; 32.19%	Mike Farlow; 2,004; 3.53%		Melody Ann Aldred (CHP); 1,175; 2.07%	Dave MacKenzie
Perth Wellington	John Nater; 22,255; 42.92%	Ethan Rabidoux; 7,756; 14.96%	Stephen McCotter; 19,480; 37.57%	Nicole Ramsdale; 1,347; 2.60%		Irma DeVries (CHP); 794 1.53%	Gary Schellenberger†
Perth Wellington	John Nater; 22,255; 42.92%	Ethan Rabidoux; 7,756; 14.96%	Stephen McCotter; 19,480; 37.57%	Nicole Ramsdale; 1,347; 2.60%		Roger Fuhr (NA); 219 0.42%	Gary Schellenberger†
Waterloo	Peter Braid; 19,318; 32.28%	Diane Freeman; 8,928; 14.92%	Bardish Chagger; 29,752; 49.71%	Richard Walsh; 1,713; 2.86%		Emma Hawley-Yan (Animal All.); 138; 0.23%	Peter Braid; Kitchener—Waterloo
Wellington—Halton Hills	Michael Chong; 32,482; 50.90%	Anne Gajerski-Cauley; 5,321; 8.34%	Don Trant; 23,279; 36.48%	Brent Allan Bouteiller; 2,547; 3.99%		Harvey Edward Anstey (CAP); 183; 0.29%	Michael Chong

=== Southwestern Ontario ===
Electoral district	Candidates					Incumbent
Electoral district	Conservative	NDP	Liberal	Green	Other	Incumbent
Chatham-Kent—Leamington	Dave Van Kesteren; 21,677; 41.71%	Tony Walsh; 9,549; 18.37%	Katie Omstead; 19,351; 37.23%	Mark Vercouteren; 1,394; 2.68%		Dave Van Kesteren; Chatham-Kent—Essex
Elgin—Middlesex—London	Karen Louise Vecchio; 28,023; 49.22%	Fred Sinclair; 8,771; 15.41%	Lori Baldwin-Sands; 17,642; 30.99%	Bronagh Joyce Morgan; 1,783; 3.13%	Lou Bernardi (Rhino.); 185 0.32%	Joe Preston†
Elgin—Middlesex—London	Karen Louise Vecchio; 28,023; 49.22%	Fred Sinclair; 8,771; 15.41%	Lori Baldwin-Sands; 17,642; 30.99%	Bronagh Joyce Morgan; 1,783; 3.13%	Michael Hopkins (CHP); 529 0.93%	Joe Preston†
Essex	Jeff Watson; 21,602; 35.69%	Tracey Ramsey; 25,072; 41.42%	Audrey Festeryga; 12,639; 20.88%	Jennifer Alderson; 1,141; 1.88%	Enver Villamizar (M-L); 77; 0.13%	Jeff Watson
Lambton—Kent—Middlesex	Bev Shipley; 28,300; 50.21%	Rex Isaac; 9,598; 17.03%	Ken Filson; 16,592; 29.44%	Jim Johnston; 1,873; 3.32%		Bev Shipley
London—Fanshawe	Suzanna Dieleman; 14,891; 27.20%	Irene Mathyssen; 20,684; 37.78%	Khalil Ramal; 17,214; 31.44%	Matthew Peloza; 1,604; 2.93%	Ali Hamada (Ind.); 352; 0.64%	Irene Mathyssen
London North Centre	Susan Truppe; 19,990; 31.10%	German Gutierrez; 9,423; 14.66%	Peter Fragiskatos; 32,427; 50.45%	Carol Dyck; 2,286; 3.56%	Marvin Roman (M-L); 145; 0.23%	Susan Truppe
London West	Ed Holder; 24,036; 35.33%	Matthew Rowlinson; 10,087; 14.83%	Kate Young; 31,167; 45.82%	Dimitri Lascaris; 1,918; 2.82%	Jacques Y. Boudreau (Libert.); 732 1.08%	Ed Holder
London West	Ed Holder; 24,036; 35.33%	Matthew Rowlinson; 10,087; 14.83%	Kate Young; 31,167; 45.82%	Dimitri Lascaris; 1,918; 2.82%	Michael Lewis (Comm.); 87 0.13%	Ed Holder
Sarnia—Lambton	Marilyn Gladu; 22,565; 38.82%	Jason Wayne McMichael; 18,102; 31.14%	Dave McPhail; 15,853; 27.27%	Peter Smith; 1,605; 2.76%		Patricia Davidson†
Windsor—Tecumseh	Jo-Anne Gignac; 14,656; 27.47%	Cheryl Hardcastle; 23,215; 43.52%	Frank Schiller; 14,177; 26.58%	David Momotiuk; 1,047; 1.96%	Laura Chesnik (M-L); 249; 0.47%	Joe Comartin†
Windsor West	Henry Lau; 9,734; 20.75%	Brian Masse; 24,085; 51.35%	David Sundin; 11,842; 25.25%	Cora LaRussa; 1,083; 2.31%	Margaret Villamizar (M-L); 161; 0.34%	Brian Masse

=== Northern Ontario ===
Electoral district	Candidates					Incumbent
Electoral district	Conservative	NDP	Liberal	Green	Other	Incumbent
Algoma—Manitoulin— Kapuskasing	André Robichaud; 9,820; 23.73%	Carol Hughes; 16,516; 39.92%	Heather Wilson; 14,111; 34.11%	Calvin John Orok; 927; 2.24%		Carol Hughes
Kenora	Greg Rickford; 8,751; 28.46%	Howard Hampton; 10,420; 33.88%	Bob Nault; 10,918; 35.50%	Ember C. McKillop; 501; 1.63%	Kelvin Boucher-Chicago (Ind.); 162; 0.53%	Greg Rickford
Nickel Belt	Aino Laamanen; 8,221; 16.74%	Claude Gravelle; 18,556; 37.78%	Marc Serré; 21,021; 42.80%	Stuart McCall; 1,217; 2.48%	Dave Starbuck (M-L); 98; 0.20%	Claude Gravelle
Nipissing—Timiskaming	Jay Aspin; 14,325; 29.31%	Kathleen Jodouin; 7,936; 16.24%	Anthony Rota; 25,357; 51.88%	Nicole Peltier; 1,257; 2.57%		Jay Aspin
Parry Sound-Muskoka	Tony Clement; 22,206; 43.30%	Matt McCarthy; 5,183; 10.11%	Trisha Cowie; 19,937; 38.88%	Glen Hodgson; 3,704; 7.22%	Duncan Bell (Pirate); 121 0.24%	Tony Clement
Parry Sound-Muskoka	Tony Clement; 22,206; 43.30%	Matt McCarthy; 5,183; 10.11%	Trisha Cowie; 19,937; 38.88%	Glen Hodgson; 3,704; 7.22%	Gordie Merton (CAP); 88 0.17%	Tony Clement
Parry Sound-Muskoka	Tony Clement; 22,206; 43.30%	Matt McCarthy; 5,183; 10.11%	Trisha Cowie; 19,937; 38.88%	Glen Hodgson; 3,704; 7.22%	Albert Gray Smith (M-L); 40 0.08%	Tony Clement
Sault Ste. Marie	Bryan Hayes; 13,615; 31.12%	Skip Morrison; 9,543; 21.81%	Terry Sheehan; 19,582; 44.75%	Kara Flannigan; 934; 2.13%	Mike Taffarel (M-L); 83; 0.19%	Bryan Hayes
Sudbury	Fred Slade; 10,473; 21.10%	Paul Loewenberg; 13,793; 27.79%	Paul Lefebvre; 23,534; 47.42%	David Robinson; 1,509; 3.04%	Jean-Raymond Audet (Ind.); 134 0.27%	Vacant
Sudbury	Fred Slade; 10,473; 21.10%	Paul Loewenberg; 13,793; 27.79%	Paul Lefebvre; 23,534; 47.42%	David Robinson; 1,509; 3.04%	J. David Popescu (Ind.); 84 0.17%	Vacant
Sudbury	Fred Slade; 10,473; 21.10%	Paul Loewenberg; 13,793; 27.79%	Paul Lefebvre; 23,534; 47.42%	David Robinson; 1,509; 3.04%	Elizabeth Rowley (Comm.); 102 0.21%	Vacant
Thunder Bay—Rainy River	Moe Comuzzi; 8,876; 21.09%	John Rafferty; 12,483; 29.66%	Don Rusnak; 18,523; 44.02%	Christy Radbourne; 2,201; 5.23%		John Rafferty
Thunder Bay— Superior North	Richard Harvey; 7,775; 17.43%	Andrew Foulds; 10,339; 23.18%	Patty Hajdu; 20,069; 44.99%	Bruce Hyer; 6,155; 13.80%	Robert Skaf (Ind.); 270; 0.61%	Bruce Hyer
Timmins-James Bay	John P. Curley; 7,605; 20.40%	Charlie Angus; 15,974; 42.86%	Todd Lever; 12,940; 34.72%	Max Kennedy; 752; 2.02%		Charlie Angus

== Manitoba ==
=== Rural Manitoba ===
Electoral district	Candidates					Incumbent
Electoral district	Conservative	NDP	Liberal	Green	Other	Incumbent
Brandon—Souris	Larry Maguire; 20,666; 50.27%	Melissa Joy Wastasecoot; 2,576; 6.27%	Jodi Wyman; 15,338; 37.31%	David Neufeld; 2,526; 6.15%		Larry Maguire
Churchill—Keewatinook Aski	Kyle G. Mirecki; 3,090; 10.32%	Niki Ashton; 13,487; 45.04%	Rebecca Chartrand; 12,575; 42.00%	August Hastmann; 537; 1.79%	Zachary Linnick (Libert.); 255; 0.85%	Niki Ashton; Churchill
Dauphin—Swan River— Neepawa	Robert Sopuck; 19,276; 46.34%	Laverne M. Lewycky; 5,097; 12.25%	Ray Piché; 12,276; 29.51%	Kate Storey; 1,592; 3.83%	Inky Mark (Ind.); 3,357; 8.07%	Robert Sopuck; Dauphin—Swan River—Marquette
Portage—Lisgar	Candice Bergen; 25,060; 60.84%	Dean Harder; 2,554; 6.20%	Ken Werbiski; 10,621; 25.79%	Beverley Eert; 1,637; 3.97%	Jerome Dondo (CHP); 1,315; 3.19%	Candice Bergen
Provencher	Ted Falk; 25,086; 56.06%	Les Lilley; 2,371; 5.30%	Terry Hayward; 15,509; 34.66%	Jeff Wheeldon; 1,779; 3.98%		Ted Falk
Selkirk—Interlake— Eastman	James Bezan; 25,617; 51.90%	Deborah Chief; 5,649; 11.44%	Joanne Levy; 15,508; 31.42%	Wayne James; 1,707; 3.46%	Donald L. Grant (Libert.); 882; 1.79%	James Bezan; Selkirk—Interlake

=== Winnipeg ===
Electoral district	Candidates					Incumbent
Electoral district	Conservative	NDP	Liberal	Green	Other	Incumbent
Charleswood—St. James—Assiniboia— Headingley	Steven Fletcher; 18,408; 39.04%	Tom Paulley; 2,842; 6.03%	Doug Eyolfson; 24,531; 52.02%	Kevin Nichols; 1,376; 2.92%		Steven Fletcher; Charleswood—St. James—Assiniboia
Elmwood—Transcona	Lawrence Toet; 14,648; 34.00%	Daniel Blaikie; 14,709; 34.14%	Andrea Richardson-Lipon; 12,713; 29.35%	Kim Parke; 1,016; 2.36%		Lawrence Toet
Kildonan—St. Paul	Jim Bell; 17,478; 39.84%	Suzanne Hrynyk; 6,270; 14.29%	MaryAnn Mihychuk; 18,717; 42.66%	Steven Stairs; 783; 1.78%	Eduard Walter Hiebert (Ind.); 142 0.32%	Joy Smith†
Kildonan—St. Paul	Jim Bell; 17,478; 39.84%	Suzanne Hrynyk; 6,270; 14.29%	MaryAnn Mihychuk; 18,717; 42.66%	Steven Stairs; 783; 1.78%	David Reimer (CHP); 485 1.11%	Joy Smith†
Saint Boniface—Saint Vital	François Catellier; 14,005; 28.69%	Erin Selby; 5,169; 10.59%	Dan Vandal; 28,530; 58.44%	Glenn Zaretski; 1,119; 2.29%		Shelly Glover†; Saint Boniface
Winnipeg Centre	Allie Szarkiewicz; 4,189; 12.36%	Pat Martin; 9,490; 28.01%	Robert-Falcon Ouellette; 18,471; 54.51%	Don Woodstock; 1,379; 4.07%	Scott Miller (CHP); 221 0.65%	Pat Martin
Winnipeg Centre	Allie Szarkiewicz; 4,189; 12.36%	Pat Martin; 9,490; 28.01%	Robert-Falcon Ouellette; 18,471; 54.51%	Don Woodstock; 1,379; 4.07%	Darrell Rankin (Comm.); 135 0.40%	Pat Martin
Winnipeg North	Harpreet Turka; 5,193; 15.29%	Levy Abad; 4,543; 13.38%	Kevin Lamoureux; 23,402; 68.90%	John Redekopp; 826; 2.43%		Kevin Lamoureux
Winnipeg South	Gordon Giesbrecht; 16,709; 34.67%	Brianne Goertzen; 2,404; 4.99%	Terry Duguid; 28,096; 58.29%	Adam Smith; 990; 2.05%		Rod Bruinooge†
Winnipeg South Centre	Joyce Bateman; 15,102; 28.19%	Matt Henderson; 4,799; 8.96%	Jim Carr; 31,993; 59.72%	Andrew Park; 1,677; 3.13%		Joyce Bateman

== Saskatchewan ==
=== Southern Saskatchewan ===
Electoral district	Candidates					Incumbent
Electoral district	Conservative	NDP	Liberal	Green	Other	Incumbent
Cypress Hills—Grasslands	David Anderson; 25,050; 69.19%	Trevor Peterson; 4,783; 13.21%	Marvin Wiens; 5,381; 14.86%	William Caton; 993; 2.74%		David Anderson
Moose Jaw—Lake Centre—Lanigan	Tom Lukiwski; 23,273; 55.46%	Dustan Hlady; 9,978; 23.78%	Perry Juttla; 7,545; 17.98%	Shawn Setyo; 961; 2.29%	Robert Thomas (Rhino.); 208; 0.50%	Ray Boughen†; Palliser
Regina—Lewvan	Trent Fraser; 16,711; 34.94%	Erin Weir; 16,843; 35.21%	Louis Browne; 13,143; 27.48%	Tamela Friesen; 839; 1.75%	Wojciech K. Dolata (Libert.); 298; 0.62%	Tom Lukiwski‡ Regina—Lumsden— Lake Centre
Regina—Qu'Appelle	Andrew Scheer; 16,486; 44.70%	Nial Kuyek; 11,144; 30.21%	Della Anaquod; 8,401; 22.78%	Greg Chatterson; 852; 2.31%		Andrew Scheer
Regina—Wascana	Michael Kram; 12,931; 30.27%	April Bourgeois; 5,362; 12.55%	Ralph Goodale; 23,552; 55.13%	Frances Simonson; 878; 2.06%		Ralph Goodale; Wascana
Souris—Moose Mountain	Robert Gordon Kitchen; 26,315; 70.14%	Vicky O'Dell; 5,131; 13.68%	Steven Bebbington; 5,076; 13.53%	Bob Deptuck; 994; 2.65%		Ed Komarnicki†
Yorkton—Melville	Cathay Wagantall; 21,683; 59.22%	Doug Ottenbreit; 7,396; 20.20%	Brooke Taylor Malinoski; 6,504; 17.76%	Elaine Marie Hughes; 1,030; 2.81%		Garry Breitkreuz†

=== Northern Saskatchewan ===
Electoral district	Candidates					Incumbent
Electoral district	Conservative	NDP	Liberal	Green	Other	Incumbent
Battlefords—Lloydminster	Gerry Ritz; 20,547; 61.01%	Glenn Tait; 5,930; 17.61%	Larry Ingram; 5,550; 16.48%	Mikaela Tenkink; 575; 1.71%	Doug Anguish (Ind.); 1,076; 3.19%	Gerry Ritz
Carlton Trail—Eagle Creek	Kelly Block; 26,004; 64.72%	Glenn Wright; 7,499; 18.66%	Alexander Slusar; 5,774; 14.37%	Lynn Wesley Oliphant; 902; 2.24%		Maurice Vellacott†; Saskatoon—Wanuskewin
Desnethé—Missinippi— Churchill River (judicial recount)	Rob Clarke; 9,105; 30.14%	Georgina Jolibois; 10,319; 34.15%	Lawrence Joseph; 10,237; 33.88%	Warren Koch; 552; 1.83%		Rob Clarke
Prince Albert	Randy Hoback; 19,673; 49.79%	Lon Borgerson; 11,244; 28.46%	Gordon Kirkby; 7,832; 19.82%	Byron Tenkink; 761; 1.93%		Randy Hoback
Saskatoon—Grasswood	Kevin Waugh; 19,166; 41.59%	Scott Bell; 13,909; 30.18%	Tracy Muggli; 12,165; 26.40%	Mark Bigland-Pritchard; 846; 1.84%		Lynne Yelich§ Blackstrap
Saskatoon—University	Brad Trost; 18,592; 41.53%	Claire Card; 14,115; 31.53%	Cynthia Marie Block; 11,287; 25.21%	Valerie Harvey; 686; 1.53%	Eric Matthew Schalm (Rhino.); 93; 0.22%	Brad Trost; Saskatoon—Humboldt
Saskatoon West	Randy Donauer; 12,401; 32.88%	Sheri Benson; 14,921; 39.56%	Lisa Abbott; 9,234; 24.48%	Lois Carol Mitchell; 658; 1.74%	Bronek Hart (Libert.); 230 0.61%	Kelly Block‡ Saskatoon—Rosetown—Biggar
Saskatoon West	Randy Donauer; 12,401; 32.88%	Sheri Benson; 14,921; 39.56%	Lisa Abbott; 9,234; 24.48%	Lois Carol Mitchell; 658; 1.74%	Jim Pankiw (Canada); 271 0.72%	Kelly Block‡ Saskatoon—Rosetown—Biggar

== Alberta ==
=== Rural Alberta ===
Electoral district	Candidates						Incumbent
Electoral district	Conservative	NDP	Liberal	Green	Libertarian	Other	Incumbent
Banff—Airdrie	Blake Richards; 42,228; 63.37%	Joanne Boissonneault; 4,521; 6.78%	Marlo Raynolds; 17,380; 26.08%	Mike MacDonald; 2,509; 3.77%			Blake Richards; Wild Rose
Battle River—Crowfoot	Kevin Sorenson; 47,552; 80.91%	Katherine Swampy; 3,844; 6.54%	Andy Kowalski; 5,505; 9.37%	Gary Kelly; 1,868; 3.18%			Kevin Sorenson; Crowfoot
Bow River	Martin Shields; 38,701; 77.42%	Lynn MacWilliam; 2,622; 5.25%	William MacDonald Alexander; 6,840; 13.68%	Rita Ann Fromholt; 919; 1.84%		Fahed Khalid (DAPC); 83 0.17%	New District
Bow River	Martin Shields; 38,701; 77.42%	Lynn MacWilliam; 2,622; 5.25%	William MacDonald Alexander; 6,840; 13.68%	Rita Ann Fromholt; 919; 1.84%		Andrew Kucy (Ind.); 543 1.09%	New District
Bow River	Martin Shields; 38,701; 77.42%	Lynn MacWilliam; 2,622; 5.25%	William MacDonald Alexander; 6,840; 13.68%	Rita Ann Fromholt; 919; 1.84%		Frans VandeStroet (CHP); 280 0.56%	New District
Foothills	John Barlow; 46,166; 75.70%	Alison Thompson; 3,919; 6.43%	Tanya MacPherson; 8,149; 13.36%	Romy S. Tittel; 1,983; 3.25%	Cory Morgan; 424; 0.70%	Marc Slingerland (CHP); 345; 0.57%	John Barlow; Macleod
Fort McMurray—Cold Lake	David Yurdiga; 28,625; 60.56%	Melody Lepine; 3,663; 7.75%	Kyle Harrietha; 13,403; 28.36%	Brian Deheer; 743; 1.57%	Scott Berry; 552; 1.17%	Roelof Janssen (CHP); 280; 0.59%	David Yurdiga; Fort McMurray—Athabasca
Grande Prairie-Mackenzie	Chris Warkentin; 38,895; 72.91%	Saba Mossagizi; 4,343; 8.14%	Reagan Johnston; 7,819; 14.66%	James David Friesen; 1,673; 3.14%	Dylan Thompson; 613; 1.15%		Chris Warkentin; Peace River
Lakeland	Shannon Stubbs; 39,882; 72.81%	Duane Zaraska; 5,513; 10.06%	Garry Parenteau; 7,500; 13.69%	Danielle Montgomery; 1,283; 2.34%	Robert George McFadzean; 601; 1.10%		Leon Benoit†; Vegreville—Wainwright
Lakeland	Shannon Stubbs; 39,882; 72.81%	Duane Zaraska; 5,513; 10.06%	Garry Parenteau; 7,500; 13.69%	Danielle Montgomery; 1,283; 2.34%	Robert George McFadzean; 601; 1.10%		Merged District
Lakeland	Shannon Stubbs; 39,882; 72.81%	Duane Zaraska; 5,513; 10.06%	Garry Parenteau; 7,500; 13.69%	Danielle Montgomery; 1,283; 2.34%	Robert George McFadzean; 601; 1.10%		Brian Storseth†; Westlock—St. Paul
Lethbridge	Rachael Harder; 32,321; 56.76%	Cheryl Meheden; 11,674; 20.50%	Mike Pyne; 10,532; 18.50%	Kas MacMillan; 1,461; 2.57%		Geoffrey Capp (CHP); 746 1.31%	Jim Hillyer‡
Lethbridge	Rachael Harder; 32,321; 56.76%	Cheryl Meheden; 11,674; 20.50%	Mike Pyne; 10,532; 18.50%	Kas MacMillan; 1,461; 2.57%		Solly Krygier-Paine (Rhino.); 209 0.37%	Jim Hillyer‡
Medicine Hat— Cardston—Warner	Jim Hillyer; 34,849; 68.80%	Erin Weir; 4,897; 9.67%	Glen Allan; 9,085; 17.94%	Brent Smith; 1,319; 2.60%		John Clayton Turner (Ind.); 500; 0.99%	LaVar Payne†; Medicine Hat
Peace River—Westlock	Arnold Viersen; 34,342; 69.35%	Cameron Alexis; 7,127; 14.39%	Chris Brown; 6,360; 12.84%	Sabrina Lee Levac; 1,247; 2.52%	Jeremy Sergeew; 443; 0.89%		New District
Red Deer—Lacombe	Blaine Calkins; 43,599; 70.71%	Doug Hart; 7,055; 11.44%	Jeff Rock; 9,235; 14.98%	Les Kuzyk; 1,773; 2.88%			Blaine Calkins; Wetaskiwin
Red Deer—Mountain View	Earl Dreeshen; 46,245; 74.33%	Paul Harris; 5,233; 8.41%	Chandra Lescia Kastern; 8,356; 13.43%	Simon Oleny; 1,621; 2.61%	James Walper; 445; 0.72%	Scott Milne (Pirate); 312; 0.50%	Earl Dreeshen; Red Deer
Yellowhead	Jim Eglinski; 37,950; 72.25%	Ken Kuzminski; 4,753; 9.05%	Ryan Maguhn; 7,467; 14.22%	Sandra Wolf Lange; 1,538; 2.93%	Cory Lystang; 817; 1.56%		Jim Eglinski

=== Edmonton and environs ===
Electoral district	Candidates						Incumbent
Electoral district	Conservative	NDP	Liberal	Green	Libertarian	Other	Incumbent
Edmonton Centre	James Cumming; 18,703; 34.95%	Gil McGowan; 13,084; 24.45%	Randy Boissonnault; 19,902; 37.19%	David Parker; 1,403; 2.62%		Steven Stauffer (Rhino.); 257 0.48%	Laurie Hawn†
Edmonton Centre	James Cumming; 18,703; 34.95%	Gil McGowan; 13,084; 24.45%	Randy Boissonnault; 19,902; 37.19%	David Parker; 1,403; 2.62%		Kat Yaki (Ind.); 163 0.30%	Laurie Hawn†
Edmonton Griesbach	Kerry Diotte; 19,157; 39.96%	Janis Irwin; 16,309; 34.02%	Brian Gold; 10,397; 21.69%	Heather Workman; 1,129; 2.35%	Maryna Goncharenko; 415; 0.87%	Mary Joyce (M-L); 112 0.23%	Peter Goldring†; Edmonton East
Edmonton Griesbach	Kerry Diotte; 19,157; 39.96%	Janis Irwin; 16,309; 34.02%	Brian Gold; 10,397; 21.69%	Heather Workman; 1,129; 2.35%	Maryna Goncharenko; 415; 0.87%	Linda Northcott (Mar.); 279 0.58%	Peter Goldring†; Edmonton East
Edmonton Griesbach	Kerry Diotte; 19,157; 39.96%	Janis Irwin; 16,309; 34.02%	Brian Gold; 10,397; 21.69%	Heather Workman; 1,129; 2.35%	Maryna Goncharenko; 415; 0.87%	Bun Bun Thompson (Rhino.); 144 0.30%	Peter Goldring†; Edmonton East
Edmonton Manning	Ziad Aboultaif; 22,166; 45.24%	Aaron Paquette; 11,582; 23.64%	Sukhdev Aujla; 13,509; 27.57%	Chris Vallee; 1,079; 2.20%		Mebreate Deres (Ind.); 540 1.10%	New District
Edmonton Manning	Ziad Aboultaif; 22,166; 45.24%	Aaron Paquette; 11,582; 23.64%	Sukhdev Aujla; 13,509; 27.57%	Chris Vallee; 1,079; 2.20%		André Vachon (M-L); 125 0.26%	New District
Edmonton Mill Woods (judicial recount)	Tim Uppal; 20,331; 41.06%	Jasvir Deol; 6,330; 12.78%	Amarjeet Sohi; 20,423; 41.24%	Ralph McLean; 1,096; 2.21%	Allen K.W. Paley; 396; 0.80%	Peter Downing (CHP); 285 0.58%	Mike Lake‡ Edmonton—Mill Woods—Beaumont
Edmonton Mill Woods (judicial recount)	Tim Uppal; 20,331; 41.06%	Jasvir Deol; 6,330; 12.78%	Amarjeet Sohi; 20,423; 41.24%	Ralph McLean; 1,096; 2.21%	Allen K.W. Paley; 396; 0.80%	Naomi Rankin (Comm.); 96 0.19%	Mike Lake‡ Edmonton—Mill Woods—Beaumont
Edmonton Mill Woods (judicial recount)	Tim Uppal; 20,331; 41.06%	Jasvir Deol; 6,330; 12.78%	Amarjeet Sohi; 20,423; 41.24%	Ralph McLean; 1,096; 2.21%	Allen K.W. Paley; 396; 0.80%	Colin Stubbs (Ind.); 560 1.13%	Mike Lake‡ Edmonton—Mill Woods—Beaumont
Edmonton Riverbend	Matt Jeneroux; 28,805; 49.89%	Brian Fleck; 9,846; 17.05%	Tariq Chaudary; 17,428; 30.18%	Valerie Kennedy; 1,275; 2.21%	Steven Lack; 386; 0.67%		James Rajotte†; Edmonton—Leduc
Edmonton Strathcona	Len Thom; 17,395; 31.28%	Linda Duncan; 24,446; 43.96%	Eleanor Olszewski; 11,524; 20.73%	Jacob K. Binnema; 1,278; 2.30%	Malcolm Stinson; 311; 0.56%	Ryan Bromsgrove (Pirate); 201 0.36%	Linda Duncan; Edmonton—Strathcona
Edmonton Strathcona	Len Thom; 17,395; 31.28%	Linda Duncan; 24,446; 43.96%	Eleanor Olszewski; 11,524; 20.73%	Jacob K. Binnema; 1,278; 2.30%	Malcolm Stinson; 311; 0.56%	Donovan Eckstrom (Rhino.); 133 0.24%	Linda Duncan; Edmonton—Strathcona
Edmonton Strathcona	Len Thom; 17,395; 31.28%	Linda Duncan; 24,446; 43.96%	Eleanor Olszewski; 11,524; 20.73%	Jacob K. Binnema; 1,278; 2.30%	Malcolm Stinson; 311; 0.56%	Chris Jones (Ind.); 116 0.21%	Linda Duncan; Edmonton—Strathcona
Edmonton Strathcona	Len Thom; 17,395; 31.28%	Linda Duncan; 24,446; 43.96%	Eleanor Olszewski; 11,524; 20.73%	Jacob K. Binnema; 1,278; 2.30%	Malcolm Stinson; 311; 0.56%	Dougal MacDonald (M-L); 93 0.17%	Linda Duncan; Edmonton—Strathcona
Edmonton Strathcona	Len Thom; 17,395; 31.28%	Linda Duncan; 24,446; 43.96%	Eleanor Olszewski; 11,524; 20.73%	Jacob K. Binnema; 1,278; 2.30%	Malcolm Stinson; 311; 0.56%	Andrew Schurman (Ind.); 107 0.19%	Linda Duncan; Edmonton—Strathcona
Edmonton West	Kelly McCauley; 26,370; 49.33%	Heather MacKenzie; 6,955; 13.01%	Karen Leibovici; 18,649; 34.89%	Pamela Leslie Bryan; 1,037; 1.94%	Alexander Dussault; 341; 0.64%	Peggy Morton (M-L); 105; 0.20%	Rona Ambrose‡ Edmonton—Spruce Grove
Edmonton—Wetaskiwin	Mike Lake; 44,949; 65.77%	Fritz K. Bitz; 6,645; 9.72%	Jacqueline Biollo; 14,660; 21.45%	Joy-Ann Hut; 1,595; 2.33%	Brayden Whitlock; 495; 0.72%		New District
St. Albert—Edmonton	Michael Cooper; 26,783; 45.24%	Darlene Malayko; 6,609; 11.16%	Beatrice Ghettuba; 13,343; 22.54%	Andrea Oldham; 821; 1.39%		Brent Rathgeber (Ind.); 11,652; 19.68%	Brent Rathgeber; Edmonton—St. Albert
Sherwood Park—Fort Saskatchewan	Garnett Genuis; 42,642; 63.94%	Joanne Cave; 6,540; 9.81%	Rod Frank; 13,615; 20.42%	Brandie Harrop; 1,648; 2.47%	Stephen C. Burry; 678; 1.02%	James Ford (Ind.); 1,563; 2.34%	Tim Uppal‡ Edmonton—Sherwood Park
Sturgeon River—Parkland	Rona Ambrose; 43,220; 70.23%	Guy Desforges; 6,166; 10.02%	Travis Dueck; 9,586; 15.58%	Brendon Greene; 1,875; 3.05%		Ernest Chauvet (CHP); 690; 1.12%	New District

=== Calgary ===
Electoral district	Candidates						Incumbent
Electoral district	Conservative	NDP	Liberal	Green	Libertarian	Other	Incumbent
Calgary Centre	Joan Crockatt; 27,746; 45.30%	Jillian Ratti; 3,412; 5.57%	Kent Hehr; 28,496; 46.52%	Thana Boonlert; 1,347; 2.20%		Yogi Henderson (Ind.); 248; 0.40%	Joan Crockatt
Calgary Confederation	Len Webber; 30,669; 45.91%	Kirk Heuser; 4,770; 7.14%	Matt Grant; 29,083; 43.53%	Natalie Odd; 2,146; 3.21%		Kevan Hunter (M-L); 140; 0.21%	Michelle Rempel‡ Calgary Centre-North
Calgary Forest Lawn	Deepak Obhrai; 19,694; 47.98%	Abdou Souraya; 4,006; 9.76%	Cam Stewart; 14,762; 35.96%	Judson Hansell; 1,229; 2.99%	Matt Badura; 832; 2.03%	Jason Devine (Comm.); 390 0.95%	Deepak Obhrai; Calgary East
Calgary Forest Lawn	Deepak Obhrai; 19,694; 47.98%	Abdou Souraya; 4,006; 9.76%	Cam Stewart; 14,762; 35.96%	Judson Hansell; 1,229; 2.99%	Matt Badura; 832; 2.03%	Max Veress (DAPC); 134 0.33%	Deepak Obhrai; Calgary East
Calgary Heritage	**Stephen J. Harper**; 37,263; 63.77%	Matt Masters Burgener; 4,255; 7.28%	Brendan Miles; 15,172; 25.97%	Kelly Christie; 1,246; 2.13%	Steven Paolasini; 246; 0.42%	Nicolas Duchastel de Montrouge (Ind.); 61 0.10%	**Stephen Harper**; Calgary Southwest
Calgary Heritage	**Stephen J. Harper**; 37,263; 63.77%	Matt Masters Burgener; 4,255; 7.28%	Brendan Miles; 15,172; 25.97%	Kelly Christie; 1,246; 2.13%	Steven Paolasini; 246; 0.42%	Larry R. Heather (Ind.); 114 0.20%	**Stephen Harper**; Calgary Southwest
Calgary Heritage	**Stephen J. Harper**; 37,263; 63.77%	Matt Masters Burgener; 4,255; 7.28%	Brendan Miles; 15,172; 25.97%	Kelly Christie; 1,246; 2.13%	Steven Paolasini; 246; 0.42%	Korry Zepik (Ind.); 73 0.12%	**Stephen Harper**; Calgary Southwest
Calgary Midnapore	Jason Kenney; 42,415; 66.73%	Laura Weston; 4,915; 7.73%	Haley Brown; 14,396; 22.65%	Brennan Wauters; 1,691; 2.66%		Peggy Askin (M-L); 145; 0.23%	Jason Kenney; Calgary Southeast
Calgary Nose Hill	Michelle Rempel; 32,760; 60.04%	Bruce Kaufman; 4,836; 8.86%	Robert Prcic; 14,671; 26.89%	Laurie Scheer; 1,384; 2.54%	Edward Gao; 727; 1.33%	Faizan Butt (DAPC); 184; 0.34%	Diane Ablonczy†; Calgary—Nose Hill
Calgary Rocky Ridge	Pat Kelly; 38,229; 60.40%	Stephanie Kot; 3,665; 5.79%	Nirmala Naidoo; 20,038; 31.66%	Catriona Wright; 1,360; 2.15%			New District
Calgary Shepard	Tom Kmiec; 43,706; 65.87%	Dany Allard; 4,532; 6.83%	Jerome James; 16,379; 24.69%	Graham MacKenzie; 1,734; 2.61%			New District
Calgary Signal Hill	Ron Liepert; 37,858; 60.55%	Khalis Ahmed; 3,128; 5.00%	Kerry Cundal; 19,108; 30.56%	Taryn Knorren; 1,586; 2.54%	**Tim Moen**; 679; 1.09%	Jesse Rau (CHP); 160; 0.26%	Rob Anders§ Calgary West
Calgary Skyview	Devinder Shory; 17,885; 39.75%	Sahajvir Singh; 3,605; 8.01%	Darshan Singh Kang; 20,644; 45.88%	Ed Reddy; 846; 1.88%		Daniel Blanchard (M-L); 88 0.20%	Devinder Shory; Calgary Northeast
Calgary Skyview	Devinder Shory; 17,885; 39.75%	Sahajvir Singh; 3,605; 8.01%	Darshan Singh Kang; 20,644; 45.88%	Ed Reddy; 846; 1.88%		Najeeb Butt (PC); 957 2.13%	Devinder Shory; Calgary Northeast
Calgary Skyview	Devinder Shory; 17,885; 39.75%	Sahajvir Singh; 3,605; 8.01%	Darshan Singh Kang; 20,644; 45.88%	Ed Reddy; 846; 1.88%		**Stephen Garvey** (DAPC); 786 1.75%	Devinder Shory; Calgary Northeast
Calgary Skyview	Devinder Shory; 17,885; 39.75%	Sahajvir Singh; 3,605; 8.01%	Darshan Singh Kang; 20,644; 45.88%	Ed Reddy; 846; 1.88%		Joseph Young (Ind.) (Note: Young was a candidate for the Communist League which is not a registered political party and ineligible to be listed on the ballot. He chose to be listed as an Independent.); 182 0.40%	Devinder Shory; Calgary Northeast

== British Columbia ==
=== BC Interior ===
Electoral district	Candidates					Incumbent
Electoral district	Conservative	NDP	Liberal	Green	Other	Incumbent
Cariboo—Prince George	Todd Doherty; 19,688; 36.64%	Trent Derrick; 13,879; 25.83%	Tracy Calogheros; 16,921; 31.49%	Richard Edward Jaques; 1,860; 3.46%	Gordon Campbell (NA) (Note: Gordon Campbell ran to provide a "none of the above" option for voters.); 402 0.75%	Dick Harris†
Cariboo—Prince George	Todd Doherty; 19,688; 36.64%	Trent Derrick; 13,879; 25.83%	Tracy Calogheros; 16,921; 31.49%	Richard Edward Jaques; 1,860; 3.46%	Sheldon Clare (Ind.); 657 1.22%	Dick Harris†
Cariboo—Prince George	Todd Doherty; 19,688; 36.64%	Trent Derrick; 13,879; 25.83%	Tracy Calogheros; 16,921; 31.49%	Richard Edward Jaques; 1,860; 3.46%	Adam De Kroon (CHP); 327 0.61%	Dick Harris†
Central Okanagan— Similkameen—Nicola	Dan Albas; 24,517; 39.56%	Angelique Wood; 11,961; 19.30%	Karley Scott; 23,059; 37.21%	Robert Mellalieu; 2,436; 3.93%		Dan Albas; Okanagan—Coquihalla
Kamloops—Thompson— Cariboo	Cathy McLeod; 24,595; 35.25%	Bill Sundhu; 21,466; 30.77%	Steve Powrie; 21,215; 30.41%	Matthew Greenwood; 2,489; 3.57%		Cathy McLeod
Kelowna—Lake Country	Ron Cannan; 25,502; 39.75%	Norah Mary Bowman; 9,039; 14.09%	Stephen Fuhr; 29,614; 46.16%	(Note: Gary Adams was selected as the Green Party candidate for Kelowna—Lake Country when he pledged to immediately resign and support the Liberal candidate, Stephen Fuhr. The party's federal leadership asked him not to resign or endorse Fuhr and Adams relented. Adams eventually registered as a candidate but soon withdrew and the party decided to respect local party members' decision to not run a candidate.)		Ron Cannan
Kootenay—Columbia	David Wilks; 23,247; 36.78%	Wayne Stetski; 23,529; 37.23%	Don Johnston; 12,315; 19.48%	Bill Green; 4,115; 6.51%		David Wilks
North Okanagan—Shuswap	Mel Arnold; 27,490; 39.30%	Jacqui Gingras; 17,907; 25.60%	Cindy Derkaz; 20,949; 29.95%	Chris George; 3,608; 5.16%		Colin Mayes†; Okanagan—Shuswap
Prince George— Peace River—Northern Rockies	Bob Zimmer; 27,237; 52.52%	Kathi Dickie; 8,014; 15.45%	Matt Shaw; 12,913; 24.90%	Elizabeth Biggar; 2,672; 5.15%	Barry Blackman (PC); 464 0.89%	Bob Zimmer; Prince George—Peace River
Prince George— Peace River—Northern Rockies	Bob Zimmer; 27,237; 52.52%	Kathi Dickie; 8,014; 15.45%	Matt Shaw; 12,913; 24.90%	Elizabeth Biggar; 2,672; 5.15%	W. Todd Keller (Libert.); 559 1.08%	Bob Zimmer; Prince George—Peace River
Skeena—Bulkley Valley	Tyler Nesbitt; 10,936; 24.79%	Nathan Cullen; 22,531; 51.08%	Brad Layton; 8,257; 18.72%	Jeannie Parnell; 1,605; 3.64%	Don Spratt (CHP); 780; 1.77%	Nathan Cullen
South Okanagan—West Kootenay	Marshall Neufeld; 19,871; 29.84%	Richard Cannings; 24,823; 37.28%	Connie Denesiuk; 18,732; 28.13%	Samantha Troy; 2,792; 4.19%	Brian Gray (Ind.); 376; 0.56%	Alex Atamanenko†; British Columbia Southern Interior

=== Fraser Valley and Southern Lower Mainland ===
Electoral district	Candidates					Incumbent
Electoral district	Conservative	NDP	Liberal	Green	Other	Incumbent
Abbotsford	Ed Fast; 23,229; 48.27%	Jen Martel; 6,593; 13.70%	Peter Njenga; 15,777; 32.78%	Stephen Fowler; 2,416; 5.02%	David MacKay (M-L); 109; 0.23%	Ed Fast
Chilliwack—Hope	Mark Strahl; 21,445; 42.33%	Seonaigh MacPherson; 9,218; 18.20%	Louis De Jaeger; 17,114; 33.78%	Thomas Cheney; 2,386; 4.71%	Alexander Johnson (Libert.); 416 0.82%	Mark Strahl; Chilliwack—Fraser Canyon
Chilliwack—Hope	Mark Strahl; 21,445; 42.33%	Seonaigh MacPherson; 9,218; 18.20%	Louis De Jaeger; 17,114; 33.78%	Thomas Cheney; 2,386; 4.71%	Dorothy-Jean O'Donnell (M-L); 82 0.16%	Mark Strahl; Chilliwack—Fraser Canyon
Cloverdale—Langley City	Dean Drysdale; 18,800; 34.77%	Rebecca Smith; 8,463; 15.65%	John Aldag; 24,617; 45.52%	Scott Anderson; 2,195; 4.06%		New District
Delta	Kerry-Lynne Findlay; 18,255; 32.78%	Jeremy Leveque; 8,311; 14.92%	Carla Qualtrough; 27,355; 49.12%	Anthony Edward Devellano; 1,768; 3.17%		New District
Fleetwood—Port Kells	Nina Grewal; 14,275; 29.27%	Garry Begg; 10,463; 21.46%	Ken Hardie; 22,871; 46.90%	Richard Hosein; 1,154; 2.37%		Nina Grewal
Langley—Aldergrove	Mark Warawa; 27,333; 45.63%	Margot Sangster; 7,490; 12.51%	Leon Jensen; 21,894; 36.55%	Simmi Saminder Kaur Dhillon; 2,644; 4.41%	Lauren Southern (Libert.); 535; 0.89%	Mark Warawa; Langley
Mission—Matsqui—Fraser Canyon	Brad Vis; 15,587; 34.91%	Dennis Adamson; 9,174; 20.55%	Jati Sidhu; 16,625; 37.23%	Arthur Alexander Green; 2,293; 5.14%	Wyatt Scott (Ind.); 914 2.05%	New District
Mission—Matsqui—Fraser Canyon	Brad Vis; 15,587; 34.91%	Dennis Adamson; 9,174; 20.55%	Jati Sidhu; 16,625; 37.23%	Arthur Alexander Green; 2,293; 5.14%	Elaine Wismer (M-L); 58 0.13%	New District
Pitt Meadows—Maple Ridge	Mike Murray; 16,373; 31.40%	Bob D'Eith; 15,450; 29.63%	Dan Ruimy; 17,673; 33.89%	Peter Tam; 2,202; 4.22%	Steve Ranta (Ind.); 452; 0.87%	Randy Kamp†; Pitt Meadows—Maple Ridge—Mission
Richmond Centre	Alice Wong; 17,622; 44.21%	Jack Trovato; 4,602; 11.54%	Lawrence Woo; 16,486; 41.36%	Vincent Chiu; 1,152; 2.89%		Alice Wong; Richmond
South Surrey—White Rock	Dianne Lynn Watts; 24,934; 44.03%	Pixie Hobby; 5,895; 10.41%	Judy Higginbotham; 23,495; 41.49%	Larry Colero; 1,938; 3.42%	Bonnie Hu (Libert.); 261 0.46%	Russ Hiebert†; South Surrey—White Rock—Cloverdale
South Surrey—White Rock	Dianne Lynn Watts; 24,934; 44.03%	Pixie Hobby; 5,895; 10.41%	Judy Higginbotham; 23,495; 41.49%	Larry Colero; 1,938; 3.42%	Brian Marlatt (PC); 108 0.19%	Russ Hiebert†; South Surrey—White Rock—Cloverdale
Steveston—Richmond East	Kenny Chiu; 16,630; 38.47%	Scott Stewart; 5,248; 12.14%	Joe Peschisolido; 19,486; 45.08%	Laura-Leah Shaw; 1,587; 3.67%	Matthew Swanston (Libert.); 274; 0.63%	Kerry-Lynne Findlay‡ Delta—Richmond East
Surrey Centre	Sucha Thind; 8,556; 19.81%	Jasbir Sandhu; 12,992; 30.08%	Randeep Sarai; 19,471; 45.07%	Jeremiah Deneault; 1,493; 3.46%	Iqbal Kahlon (Comm.); 133 0.31%	Jasbir Sandhu; Surrey North
Surrey Centre	Sucha Thind; 8,556; 19.81%	Jasbir Sandhu; 12,992; 30.08%	Randeep Sarai; 19,471; 45.07%	Jeremiah Deneault; 1,493; 3.46%	Kevin Pielak (CHP); 553 1.28%	Jasbir Sandhu; Surrey North
Surrey—Newton	Harpreet Singh; 6,978; 15.71%	Jinny Sims; 11,602; 26.12%	Sukh Dhaliwal; 24,869; 55.98%	Pamela Sangha; 975; 2.19%		Jinny Sims; Newton—North Delta

=== Vancouver and Northern Lower Mainland ===
Electoral district	Candidates							Incumbent
Electoral district	Conservative	NDP	Liberal	Green	Libertarian	Marxist-Leninist	Other	Incumbent
Burnaby North—Seymour	Mike Little; 14,612; 27.84%	Carol Baird Ellan; 15,537; 29.61%	Terry Beech; 18,938; 36.09%	Lynne Quarmby; 2,765; 5.27%	Chris Tylor; 252; 0.48%	Brian Sproule; 43; 0.08%	Helen Hee Soon Chang (Ind.); 207 0.39%	Kennedy Stewart‡ Burnaby—Douglas
Burnaby North—Seymour	Mike Little; 14,612; 27.84%	Carol Baird Ellan; 15,537; 29.61%	Terry Beech; 18,938; 36.09%	Lynne Quarmby; 2,765; 5.27%	Chris Tylor; 252; 0.48%	Brian Sproule; 43; 0.08%	Brent Jantzen (Comm.); 126 0.24%	Kennedy Stewart‡ Burnaby—Douglas
Burnaby South	Grace Seear; 12,441; 27.11%	Kennedy Stewart; 16,094; 35.07%	Adam Pankratz; 15,547; 33.88%	Wyatt Tessari; 1,306; 2.85%	Liz Jaluague; 499; 1.09%			New District
Coquitlam— Port Coquitlam	Douglas Horne; 18,083; 32.00%	Sara Norman; 15,400; 27.25%	Ron McKinnon; 19,938; 35.28%	Brad Nickason; 2,076; 3.67%	Lewis Clarke Dahlby; 1,014; 1.79%			James Moore†; Port Moody—Westwood—Port Coquitlam
New Westminster— Burnaby	Chloé Ellis; 10,512; 19.97%	Peter Julian; 22,876; 43.46%	Sasha Ramnarine; 15,253; 28.97%	Kyle Routledge; 2,487; 4.72%	Rex Brocki; 1,368; 2.60%	Joseph Theriault; 146; 0.28%		Peter Julian; Burnaby—New Westminster
North Vancouver	Andrew Saxton; 17,301; 26.88%	Carleen Thomas; 5,015; 7.79%	Jonathan Wilkinson; 36,458; 56.65%	Claire Martin; 5,350; 8.31%	Ismet Yetisen; 136; 0.21%		Payam Azad (Ind.); 94; 0.15%	Andrew Saxton
Port Moody—Coquitlam	Tim Laidler; 16,112; 29.47%	Fin Donnelly; 19,706; 36.05%	Jessie Adcock; 16,888; 30.89%	Marcus Madsen; 1,878; 3.44%		Roland Verrier; 83; 0.15%		Fin Donnelly; New Westminster—Coquitlam
Vancouver Centre	Elaine Allan; 9,818; 16.91%	Constance Barnes; 11,618; 20.01%	Hedy Fry; 32,554; 56.08%	Lisa Barrett; 3,370; 5.81%	John Clarke; 614; 1.06%	Michael Hill; 74; 0.13%		Hedy Fry
Vancouver East	James Low; 6,322; 10.77%	Jenny Kwan; 29,316; 49.94%	Edward Wong; 16,532; 28.16%	Wes Regan; 5,395; 9.19%		Anne Jamieson; 214; 0.36%	Peter Marcus (Comm.); 525 0.89%	Libby Davies†
Vancouver East	James Low; 6,322; 10.77%	Jenny Kwan; 29,316; 49.94%	Edward Wong; 16,532; 28.16%	Wes Regan; 5,395; 9.19%		Anne Jamieson; 214; 0.36%	D. Alex Millar (Ind.); 216 0.37%	Libby Davies†
Vancouver East	James Low; 6,322; 10.77%	Jenny Kwan; 29,316; 49.94%	Edward Wong; 16,532; 28.16%	Wes Regan; 5,395; 9.19%		Anne Jamieson; 214; 0.36%	Shawn Vulliez (Pirate); 188 0.32%	Libby Davies†
Vancouver Granville	Erinn Broshko; 14,028; 26.06%	Mira Oreck; 14,462; 26.87%	Jody Wilson-Raybould; 23,643; 43.93%	Michael Barkusky; 1,691; 3.14%				New District
Vancouver Kingsway	Jojo Quimpo; 9,538; 21.01%	Don Davies; 20,763; 45.74%	Steven Kou; 12,625; 27.81%	Catherine Moore; 1,476; 3.25%	Matt Kadioglu; 468; 1.03%	Donna Petersen; 81; 0.18%	Kimball Cariou (Comm.); 445; 0.98%	Don Davies
Vancouver Quadra	Blair Lockhart; 13,683; 25.83%	Scott Andrews; 5,748; 10.85%	Joyce Murray; 31,102; 58.71%	Kris Constable; 2,229; 4.21%			Marc Boyer (Mar.); 65 0.12%	Joyce Murray
Vancouver Quadra	Blair Lockhart; 13,683; 25.83%	Scott Andrews; 5,748; 10.85%	Joyce Murray; 31,102; 58.71%	Kris Constable; 2,229; 4.21%			Jean-François Caron (Ind.); 59 0.11%	Joyce Murray
Vancouver Quadra	Blair Lockhart; 13,683; 25.83%	Scott Andrews; 5,748; 10.85%	Joyce Murray; 31,102; 58.71%	Kris Constable; 2,229; 4.21%			Trevor Clinton Walper (Pirate); 86 0.16%	Joyce Murray
Vancouver South	Wai Young; 15,115; 33.88%	Amandeep Nijjar; 6,230; 13.97%	Harjit Sajjan; 21,773; 48.81%	Elain Ng; 1,149; 2.58%		Charles Boylan; 178; 0.40%	Raj Gupta (PC); 166; 0.37%	Wai Young
West Vancouver— Sunshine Coast— Sea to Sky Country	John Weston; 17,411; 26.20%	Larry Koopman; 6,554; 9.86%	Pam Goldsmith-Jones; 36,300; 54.62%	Ken Melamed; 5,907; 8.89%		Carol-Lee Chapman; 106; 0.16%	Robin Kehler (Mar.); 180; 0.27%	John Weston

=== Vancouver Island ===
Electoral district	Candidates					Incumbent
Electoral district	Conservative	NDP	Liberal	Green	Other	Incumbent
Courtenay—Alberni	John Duncan; 19,714; 28.22%	Gord Johns; 26,582; 38.06%	Carrie Powell-Davidson; 15,212; 21.78%	Glenn Sollitt; 8,201; 11.74%	Barbara Biley (M-L); 140; 0.20%	James Lunney†; Nanaimo—Alberni
Cowichan—Malahat—Langford	Martin Barker; 14,091; 22.81%	Alistair MacGregor; 22,200; 35.94%	Luke Krayenhoff; 14,685; 23.77%	Fran Hunt-Jinnouchi; 10,462; 16.93%	Alastair Haythornthwaite (M-L); 340; 0.55%	Jean Crowder†; Nanaimo—Cowichan
Esquimalt—Saanich—Sooke	Shari Lukens; 11,912; 17.50%	Randall Garrison; 23,836; 35.01%	David Merner; 18,622; 27.35%	Frances Litman; 13,575; 19.94%	Tyson Strandlund (Comm.); 136; 0.20%	Randall Garrison; Esquimalt—Juan de Fuca
Nanaimo—Ladysmith	Mark Allen MacDonald; 16,637; 23.35%	Sheila Malcolmson; 23,651; 33.20%	Tim Tessier; 16,753; 23.52%	Paul Manly; 14,074; 19.76%	Jack East (M-L); 126; 0.18%	New District
North Island—Powell River	Laura Smith; 15,840; 26.17%	Rachel Blaney; 24,340; 40.21%	Peter Schwarzhoff; 15,416; 25.47%	Brenda Sayers; 4,940; 8.16%		John Duncan‡ Vancouver Island North
Saanich—Gulf Islands	Robert Boyd; 13,260; 19.46%	Alicia Cormier; 6,181; 9.07%	Tim Kane; 11,380; 16.70%	**Elizabeth May**; 37,070; 54.40%	Meghan Jess Porter (Libert.); 249; 0.37%	**Elizabeth May**
Victoria	John Rizzuti; 8,480; 11.79%	Murray Rankin; 30,397; 42.28%	Cheryl Thomas; 8,489; 11.81% (Note: Cheryl Thomas publicly withdrew from the election 30 September; her name remained on the ballot as a Liberal candidate because no change could be made to the list of candidates after 28 September.)	Jo-Ann Roberts; 23,666; 32.92%	Saul Andersen (Ind.); 124 0.17%	Murray Rankin
Victoria	John Rizzuti; 8,480; 11.79%	Murray Rankin; 30,397; 42.28%	Cheryl Thomas; 8,489; 11.81%	Jo-Ann Roberts; 23,666; 32.92%	Art Lowe (Libert.); 539 0.75%	Murray Rankin
Victoria	John Rizzuti; 8,480; 11.79%	Murray Rankin; 30,397; 42.28%	Cheryl Thomas; 8,489; 11.81%	Jo-Ann Roberts; 23,666; 32.92%	Jordan Reichert (Animal All.); 200 0.28%	Murray Rankin

== Nunavut ==
Electoral district	Candidates				Incumbent
Electoral district	Conservative	NDP	Liberal	Green	Incumbent
Nunavut	Leona Aglukkaq; 2,956; 24.78%	Jack Iyerak Anawak; 3,171; 26.58%	Hunter Tootoo; 5,619; 47.11%	Spencer Rocchi; 182; 1.53%	Leona Aglukkaq

== Northwest Territories ==
Electoral district	Candidates				Incumbent
Electoral district	Conservative	NDP	Liberal	Green	Incumbent
Northwest Territories	Floyd Roland; 3,481; 18.35%	Dennis Fraser Bevington; 5,783; 30.48%	Michael McLeod; 9,172; 48.34%	John Moore; 537; 2.83%	Dennis Bevington

== Yukon ==
Electoral district	Candidates				Incumbent
Electoral district	Conservative	NDP	Liberal	Green	Incumbent
Yukon	Ryan Leef; 4,928; 24.29%	Melissa Atkinson; 3,943; 19.43%	Larry Bagnell; 10,887; 53.65%	Frank de Jong; 533; 2.63%	Ryan Leef

== See also ==
- Results by riding of the Canadian federal election, 2011
- Results by riding of the Canadian federal election, 2008
- Results by riding of the Canadian federal election, 2006
