= Matthew Rowlinson =

Canadian politician

- Born: 1956 (age 69–70); Montréal
- Occupation: English literature scholar
- Spouse: Sasha Torres
- Writing career
- Genre: nineteenth-century British literature
- Notable works: Real Money and Romanticism

Matthew Rowlinson (born 1956) is a Canadian scholar and political candidate. He is professor and former chair of graduate studies in English at the University of Western Ontario. Rowlinson is known for his research on the relationship between literature and economics.

He has run as a candidate for Canada's federal parliament as a NDP candidate in London, Ontario in 2015.

== Books ==
- Real Money and Romanticism, Cambridge University Press, 2010
- Tennyson’s Fixations: Psychoanalysis and the Topics of the Early Poetry, University Press of Virginia, 1994
