= By-elections to the 42nd Canadian Parliament =

2015–2019 elections for vacant seats

- December 3, 2015 – September 10, 2019

18 seats in the House of Commons
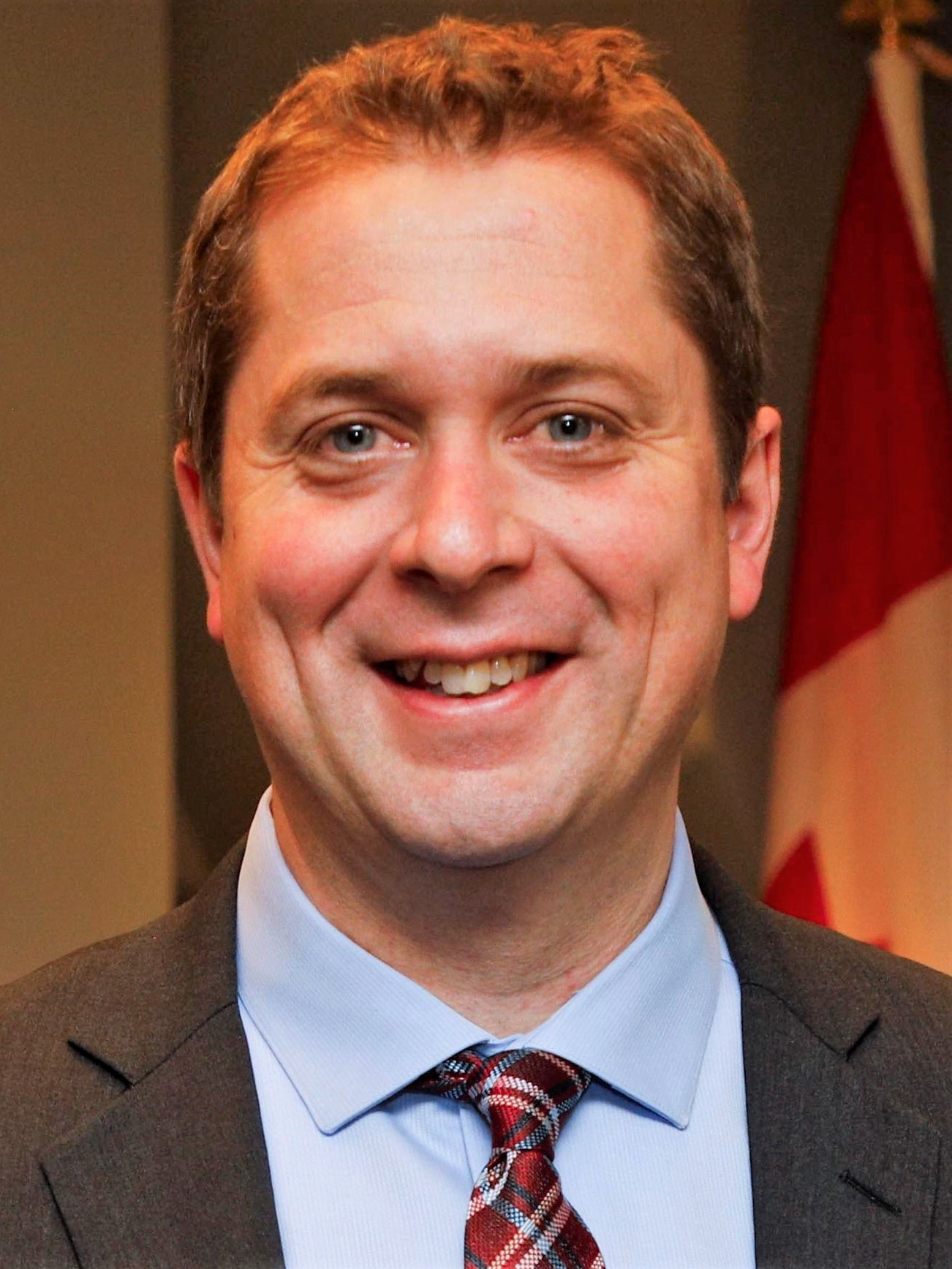

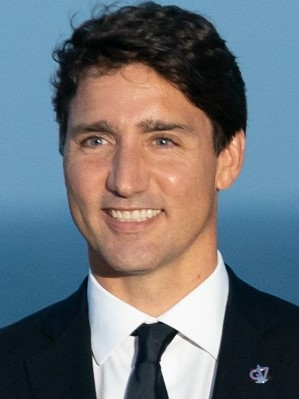

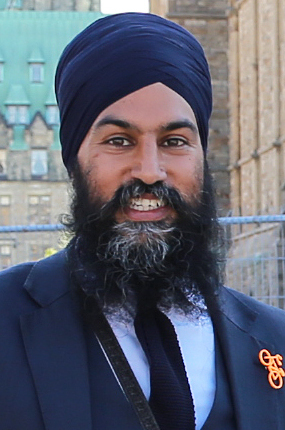

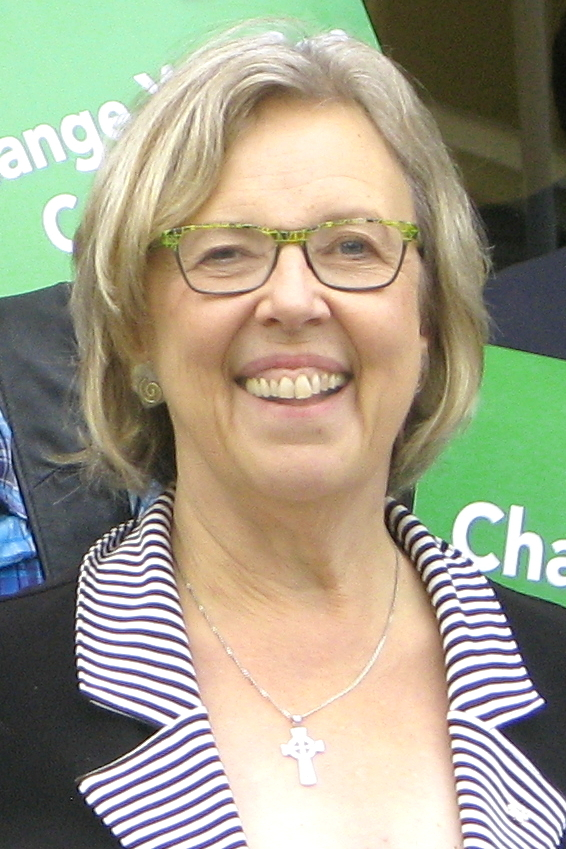

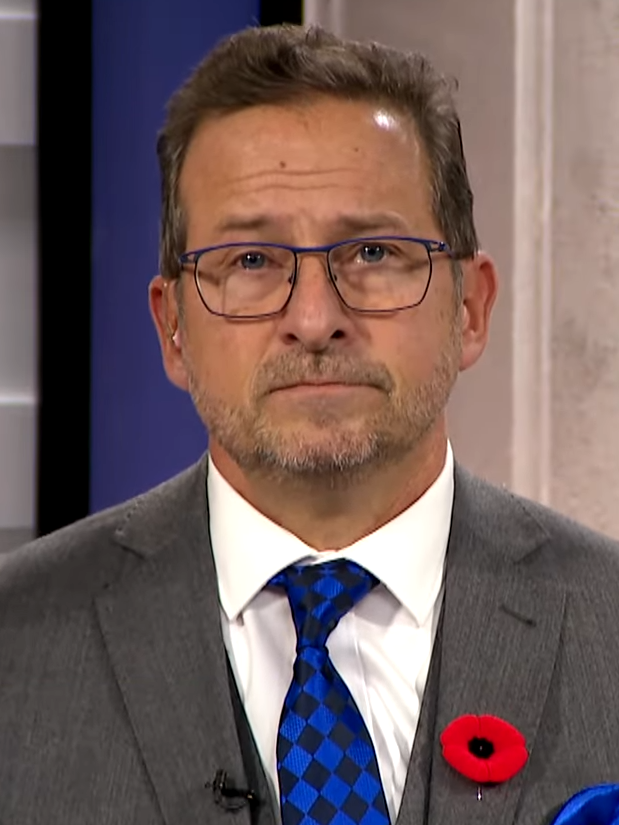
	First party	Second party	Third party
Leader	Andrew Scheer	Justin Trudeau	Jagmeet Singh
Party	Conservative	Liberal	New Democratic
Leader since	May 27, 2017	April 14, 2013	October 1, 2017
Seats up	9	6	3
Seats won	8	8	1
Seat change	▼1	▲2	▼2
Popular vote	193,153	144,444	49,630
Percentage	44.20%	33.05%	11.36%
Swing	▲3.78 pp	▼2.86 pp	▼5.30 pp
	Fourth party	Fifth party
Leader	Elizabeth May	Yves-François Blanchet
Party	Green	Bloc Québécois
Leader since	August 27, 2006	September 14, 2018
Seats up	0	0
Seats won	1	0
Seat change	▲1	Steady
Popular vote	25,652	12,103
Percentage	5.87%	2.77% (Note: 12.99% where running)
Swing	▲2.19 pp	▲0.09 pp (Note: ▼0.50 pp where running)

By-elections to the 42nd Canadian Parliament were held to fill vacancies in the House of Commons of Canada between the 2015 and the 2019 federal elections. The 42nd Canadian Parliament existed from 2015 to 2019 with the membership of its House of Commons having been determined by the results of the Canadian federal election held on October 19, 2015. The Liberal Party of Canada had a majority government during this Parliament.

A by-election was held on October 24, 2016, following the death of Jim Hillyer (Conservative, Medicine Hat—Cardston—Warner) on March 23, 2016.

Five by-elections were held on April 3, 2017: One following the death of Mauril Bélanger (Liberal, Ottawa—Vanier) on August 16, 2016. A second was held due to the former prime minister Stephen Harper's (Conservative, Calgary Heritage) resignation from parliament on August 26, A third was held due to the resignation of Jason Kenney (Conservative, Calgary Midnapore), on September 23, to enter provincial politics and pursue the leadership of the Alberta PCs. Two others were called for Markham—Thornhill and Saint-Laurent, respectively following the appointments of John McCallum and Stéphane Dion (both Liberal) as Ambassadors to China and Germany, respectively. They officially resigned their seats in the House of Commons on January 31, 2017.

Two further by-elections were held on October 23, 2017, in Sturgeon River—Parkland and Lac-Saint-Jean, following the resignations of former interim Conservative leader Rona Ambrose on July 4, 2017, and former Conservative deputy leader Denis Lebel on August 9.

Four by-elections were held on December 11, 2017, due to the death on September 14, 2017, of Arnold Chan (Liberal, Scarborough—Agincourt), the resignations effective September 30, of former cabinet minister Judy Foote (Liberal, Bonavista—Burin—Trinity), and Dianne Watts (Conservative, South Surrey—White Rock) to enter provincial politics and pursue the leadership of the British Columbia Liberal Party, and in Battlefords—Lloydminster due to the resignation of Conservative MP Gerry Ritz on October 2.

One by-election was held on June 18, 2018 following the resignation of Denis Lemieux (Liberal, Chicoutimi—Le Fjord) on December 1, 2017.

One by-election was held on December 3, 2018 following the death of Gord Brown (Conservative, Leeds—Grenville—Thousand Islands and Rideau Lakes) on May 2, 2018.

Three additional by-elections were held on February 25, 2019 due to the announcement by former New Democratic Party leader Tom Mulcair of his resignation of the seat of Outremont on August 3, 2018 to accept an academic position, the announcement by NDP MP Kennedy Stewart of his resignation of the seat of Burnaby South on September 17 to run for Mayor of Vancouver, and the announcement by Conservative MP Peter Van Loan of his resignation of the seat of York—Simcoe on September 30, 2018.

A further vacancy occurred due to the resignation on January 2, 2019, of Sheila Malcolmson (NDP, Nanaimo—Ladysmith) to enter provincial politics. However, the government announced that no federal by-election would be called in the riding before the provincial by-election held on January 30, 2019, in order to avoid an "overlap".

The writ for a by-election must be dropped no sooner than 11 days and no later than 180 days after the Chief Electoral Officer is officially notified of a vacancy via a warrant issued by the Speaker. Under the Canada Elections Act, the minimum length of a campaign is 36 days between dropping the writ and election day.

Due to the passage of Bill C-76 which made an amendment to the Parliament of Canada Act that took effect January 19, 2019 no writ for the election of a member of the House shall be issued if the vacancy occurs less than nine months before the date fixed under the Canada Elections Act for the next general election. As a result, the cut-off date for a vacancy to cause a by-election for the 42nd Parliament was January 21, 2019. Any vacancies that occurred after that date were not filled until the next federal election on October 21, 2019.

Nicola Di Iorio (Liberal, Saint-Léonard—Saint-Michel) resigned on January 29, 2019, eight days after the deadline for a vacancy to occur and cause a by-election. Raj Grewal (Brampton East) had announced on November 23, 2018 that he intended to resign his seat due to a gambling addiction but later announced, on November 30, that he was resigning from the Liberal caucus but would keep his seat as an independent for the time being. On January 25, 2019, he announced that he would keep his seat in parliament until the next federal election in October.

== Summary ==
Analysis of byelections by turnout and vote share for winning candidate (vs 2015)
Riding and winning party			Turnout		Vote share for winning candidate	
Riding and winning party			%	Change (pp)	%	Change (pp)
Medicine Hat—Cardston—Warner	█ Conservative	Hold	44.54	-21.57	69.85	1.05
Calgary Heritage	█ Conservative	Hold	33.46	-39.16	71.47	7.71
Calgary Midnapore	█ Conservative	Hold	32.46	-40.10	77.17	10.44
Markham—Thornhill	█ Liberal	Hold	27.51	-33.31	51.53	-4.19
Ottawa—Vanier	█ Liberal	Hold	34.46	-39.19	51.20	-6.37
Saint-Laurent	█ Liberal	Hold	28.33	-30.65	59.13	-2.44
Lac-Saint-Jean	█ Liberal	Gain	41.61	-24.17	38.59	20.15
Sturgeon River—Parkland	█ Conservative	Hold	23.68	-47.24	77.36	7.13
Battlefords—Lloydminster	█ Conservative	Hold	27.05	-39.46	69.56	8.55
Bonavista—Burin—Trinity	█ Liberal	Hold	21.43	-35.94	69.22	-12.58
Scarborough—Agincourt	█ Liberal	Hold	26.74	-32.68	49.44	-2.50
South Surrey—White Rock	█ Liberal	Gain	38.13	-36.60	47.49	6.00
Chicoutimi—Le Fjord	█ Conservative	Gain	36.06	-30.61	52.73	36.13
Leeds—Grenville—Thousand Islands and Rideau Lakes	█ Conservative	Hold	35.89	-35.18	57.83	10.45
Burnaby South	█ New Democratic	Hold	30.10	-30.68	38.90	3.83
Outremont	█ Liberal	Gain	21.57	-40.35	40.43	6.97
York—Simcoe	█ Conservative	Hold	20.03	-43.23	53.91	3.66
Nanaimo—Ladysmith	█ Green	Gain	41.13	-33.84	37.26	17.51

== Overview ==
By-election	Date	Incumbent	Party	Winner	Party	Cause	Retained
Nanaimo—Ladysmith	May 6, 2019	Sheila Malcolmson	New Democratic	Paul Manly	Green	Resigned to enter provincial politics	No
York—Simcoe	February 25, 2019	Peter Van Loan	Conservative	Scot Davidson	Conservative	Resigned	Yes
Burnaby South	February 25, 2019	Kennedy Stewart	New Democratic	Jagmeet Singh	New Democratic	Resigned to run for Mayor of Vancouver	Yes
Outremont	February 25, 2019	Tom Mulcair	New Democratic	Rachel Bendayan	Liberal	Resigned to accept an academic appointment	No
Leeds—Grenville— Thousand Islands and Rideau Lakes	December 3, 2018	Gord Brown	Conservative	Michael Barrett	Conservative	Death (heart attack)	Yes
Chicoutimi—Le Fjord	June 18, 2018	Denis Lemieux	Liberal	Richard Martel	Conservative	Resigned	No
Battlefords—Lloydminster	December 11, 2017	Gerry Ritz	Conservative	Rosemarie Falk	Conservative	Resigned	Yes
South Surrey—White Rock	December 11, 2017	Dianne Watts	Conservative	Gordie Hogg	Liberal	Resigned to seek the leadership of the British Columbia Liberal Party	No
Bonavista—Burin—Trinity	December 11, 2017	Judy Foote	Liberal	Churence Rogers	Liberal	Resigned due to family reasons	Yes
Scarborough—Agincourt	December 11, 2017	Arnold Chan	Liberal	Jean Yip	Liberal	Death (nasopharyngeal cancer)	Yes
Lac-Saint-Jean	October 23, 2017	Denis Lebel	Conservative	Richard Hébert	Liberal	Resigned to accept a position in the private sector	No
Sturgeon River—Parkland	October 23, 2017	Rona Ambrose	Conservative	Dane Lloyd	Conservative	Resigned to accept an academic appointment	Yes
Saint-Laurent	April 3, 2017	Stéphane Dion	Liberal	Emmanuella Lambropoulos	Liberal	Resigned to accept appointment as Canadian Ambassador to Germany	Yes
Markham—Thornhill	April 3, 2017	John McCallum	Liberal	Mary Ng	Liberal	Resigned to accept appointment as Canadian Ambassador to China	Yes
Calgary Midnapore	April 3, 2017	Jason Kenney	Conservative	Stephanie Kusie	Conservative	Resigned to seek the leadership of the Progressive Conservative Association of Alberta	Yes
Calgary Heritage	April 3, 2017	Stephen Harper	Conservative	Bob Benzen	Conservative	Resigned	Yes
Ottawa—Vanier	April 3, 2017	Mauril Bélanger	Liberal	Mona Fortier	Liberal	Death (amyotrophic lateral sclerosis)	Yes
Medicine Hat— Cardston—Warner	October 24, 2016	Jim Hillyer	Conservative	Glen Motz	Conservative	Death (heart attack)	Yes

== October 24, 2016 by-election ==
=== Medicine Hat—Cardston—Warner ===
A by-election was held on October 24, 2016, in the riding of Medicine Hat—Cardston—Warner, which had been vacant since March 23, 2016, when Conservative Party of Canada MP Jim Hillyer died in his office following a heart attack. The riding has been held by centre-right parties since Bert Hargrave defeated Liberal incumbent Bud Olson, himself a former Social Credit MP, in 1972. This was the first by-election in the 108-year history of the Medicine Hat constituency. The Speaker's warrant regarding the vacancy was received on March 24, 2016.

Retired Medicine Hat Police inspector Glen Motz defeated businessman Brian Benoit, former Cardston-Taber-Warner and Calgary-Glenmore MLA Paul Hinman, lawyer Michael W. Jones, and party worker Joseph Schow for the Conservative nomination, which was held in late June. Cypress-Medicine Hat MLA Drew Barnes, former Medicine Hat MLA Blake Pedersen, and Dan Hein, Hillyer's closest competitor for the nomination in 2015, all declined to run for the Conservative nomination despite speculation to the contrary.

Well-known Medicine Hat businessman Stan Sakamoto was the Liberal candidate.

The Libertarian Party of Canada nominated Sheldon Johnston as its candidate. The Libertarians and the Rhinoceros Party nominated candidates for the first time in Medicine Hat.

Canadian federal by-election, October 24, 2016: Medicine Hat—Cardston—Warner Death of Jim Hillyer
Party	Candidate	Votes	%	±%	Expenditures
Conservative	Glen Motz	23,932	69.85	+1.05	$66,149.98
Liberal	Stan Sakamoto	8,777	25.62	+7.68	$105,540.44
Christian Heritage	Rod Taylor	703	2.05	–	$14,100.00
New Democratic	Beverly Ann Waege	353	1.03	–8.64	$147.55
Libertarian	Sheldon W. Johnston	285	0.83	–	$1,596.90
Rhinoceros	Kayne Cooper	211	0.62	–	none listed
Total valid votes/expense limit		34,261	99.82	–	$112,531.55
Total rejected ballots		61	0.18	–0.05	
Turnout		34,322	44.22	–20.96	
Eligible voters		77,608			
Conservative hold		Swing		+4.36	
Source: Elections Canada

== April 3, 2017 by-elections ==
=== Ottawa—Vanier ===
A by-election was held on April 3, 2017, in the riding of Ottawa—Vanier, which had been vacant since the death of Mauril Bélanger on August 16, 2016, from amyotrophic lateral sclerosis (also known as Lou Gehrig's disease). The riding was one of the most solidly Liberal in the country, having elected Liberals both federally and provincially in every election since its creation in 1935. The Speaker's warrant regarding the vacancy was received on August 23, 2016.

After several prominent potential candidates, including Bélanger's widow Catherine Bélanger, Ottawa councillors Tobi Nussbaum and Tim Tierney, and 2014 council candidate Catherine Fortin LeFaivre declined to run, eight candidates sought the Liberal nomination: Senate staffer Khatera Akbari, lawyer Jean Claude Dubuisson, communications consultant Mona Fortier, Liberal staffer Eric Khaiat, former Cape Breton Highlands—Canso MP Francis LeBlanc, public servant Ainsley Malhotra, former executive director of The Humanitarian Coalition Nicolas Moyer, and Unique FM executive director Véronique Soucy. Up to 6,500 party members were eligible to vote in the nomination contest. Mona Fortier won the nomination on February 5, 2017.

Unsuccessful 2015 candidate Emilie Taman, a University of Ottawa law professor and daughter of former Supreme Court Justice Louise Arbour, ran again for the NDP.

Parliament Hill staffer Adrian Papara defeated former New Brunswick MLA Joel Bernard for the Conservative Party nomination, decided on February 16.

Educator and community activist Nira Dookeran was the Green candidate.

Canadian federal by-election, April 3, 2017: Ottawa—Vanier Death of Mauril Bélanger
Party	Candidate	Votes	%	±%
Liberal	Mona Fortier	15,195	51.33	−6.24
New Democratic	Emilie Taman	8,557	28.91	+9.66
Conservative	Adrian Paul Papara	4,484	15.15	−3.96
Green	Nira Dookeran	999	3.37	+0.26
Independent	John Turmel	147	0.50	
Libertarian	Damien Wilson	122	0.41	−0.30
Independent	Christina Wilson	99	0.33	
Total valid votes/expense limit		29,603	100.0	–
Total rejected ballots		176	-	
Turnout		29,779		
Eligible voters		86,404		
Liberal hold		Swing		−7.91
Source: Elections Canada

=== Calgary Heritage ===
The riding of Calgary Heritage became vacant when former Prime Minister of Canada Stephen Harper resigned his seat on August 26, 2016, to return to private life, including accepting directorships on corporate boards and establishing a consultancy firm. The electoral district was created for the 2015 federal election and has had Harper as its only MP; however, it is largely composed of the former riding of Calgary Southwest which was held by conservative parties throughout its existence.

Bob Benzen, a small business owner and member of the Calgary Heritage Conservative Association defeated Rick Billington, a lawyer and the former president of the Calgary Heritage Conservative Association, and city prosecutor Paul Frank for the Conservative nomination, which was decided on October 23. Former Calgary Centre MP Joan Crockatt, party insider Alan Hallman, former Medicine Hat MP Monte Solberg, and Dan Williams, a former staffer to Calgary Midnapore MP Jason Kenney, all declined to run for the nomination despite speculation to the contrary. Ric McIver, leader of the Progressive Conservative Association of Alberta and MLA for Calgary-Hays, stated that he would not run.

Rumoured candidates for the Liberal nomination included physician Brendan Miles, the 2015 candidate in this riding, Chima Nkemdirim, the chief of staff to Calgary Mayor Naheed Nenshi, and former Conservative MP Lee Richardson. On February 8, 2017, the Liberal nomination was won by physician Scott Forsyth, defeating Steven Turner and Kanwar Gill.

Khalis Ahmed won the uncontested NDP nomination.

Taryn Knorren defeated Brennan Wauters for the Green Party of Canada nomination.

The Libertarian candidate was Darcy Gerow.

Businesswoman and former Dragons' Den star Arlene Dickinson was considered a potential candidate until she declined interest on January 22. Dickinson stated she had supported parts of both Conservative and Liberal platforms in the past, but considers herself non-partisan.

The by-election was announced on February 22, 2017. The Speaker's warrant regarding the vacancy was received on August 29, 2016. The last day a by-election could have been announced was February 25, 2017, with an election held at least 36 days after being announced.

Canadian federal by-election, April 3, 2017: Calgary Heritage Resignation of Stephen Harper
Party	Candidate	Votes	%	±%	Expenditures
Conservative	Bob Benzen	19,383	71.48	+7.71	$105,821.01
Liberal	Scott Forsyth	5,889	21.72	–4.25	$52,539.03
New Democratic	Khalis Ahmed	785	2.89	–4.39	$1,292.92
Green	Taryn Knorren	484	1.78	–0.35	none listed
Christian Heritage	Jeff Willerton	385	1.42	–	$27,034.59
Libertarian	Darcy Gerow	114	0.42	+0.00	none listed
National Advancement	Stephen J. Garvey	76	0.28	–	$594.45
Total valid votes/expense limit		27,116	99.71	–	$113,917.11
Total rejected ballots		78	0.29	–0.10	
Turnout		27,194	33.46	–39.16	
Eligible voters		81,270			
Conservative hold		Swing		+5.98	
Source: Elections Canada

=== Calgary Midnapore ===
The riding of Calgary Midnapore was vacated by Conservative MP Jason Kenney who resigned his seat effective September 23, 2016, to seek the leadership of the Progressive Conservative Association of Alberta. The electoral district was created for the 2015 federal election and has had Kenney as its only MP, however predecessor ridings from which Calgary Midnapore was created had, since the 1993 federal election, successively elected Reform, Canadian Alliance and Conservative MPs.

Former diplomat Stephanie Kusie defeated entrepreneur Myles McDougall and local federal riding association president Jack Redekop for the Conservative nomination, held on January 14, 2017.

Haley Brown was acclaimed as the Liberal candidate on January 22.

Holly Heffernan was acclaimed as the NDP candidate on February 6.

Ryan Zedic was acclaimed as the Green Party of Canada candidate on December 8, 2016.

The by-election, held on April 3, 2017, was announced on February 22, 2017. The Speaker's warrant regarding the vacancy was received on September 23, 2016. The last day a by-election could have been announced was March 22, 2017, with an election held at least 36 days afterwards.

Canadian federal by-election, April 3, 2017: Calgary Midnapore Resignation of Jason Kenney
Party	Candidate	Votes	%	±%	Expenditures
Conservative	Stephanie Kusie	22,454	77.25	+10.52	$115,744.15
Liberal	Haley Brown	4,950	17.03	–5.62	$50,686.42
New Democratic	Holly Heffernan	735	2.53	–5.20	$1,338.85
Green	Ryan Zedic	605	2.08	–0.58	$2,056.40
Christian Heritage	Larry R. Heather	251	0.86	–	$8,591.53
National Advancement	Kulbir Singh Chawla	73	0.25	–	$1,307.66
Total valid votes/expense limit		29,068	99.77	–	$120,973.76
Total rejected ballots		66	0.23	–0.05	
Turnout		29,134	32.46	–40.10	
Eligible voters		89,748			
Conservative hold		Swing		+8.08	
Source: Elections Canada

=== Markham—Thornhill ===
The riding of Markham—Thornhill was vacated on February 1, 2017, following the appointment of Liberal MP and Minister of Immigration, Refugees and Citizenship John McCallum as Ambassador to China. The electoral district was created for the 2015 federal election and has had McCallum as its only MP, however McCallum had represented predecessor ridings from which Markham—Thornhill was created since the 2000 federal election.

Justin Trudeau's director of appointments and former senior Queen's Park staffer Mary Ng, defeated small business owner Nadeem Quereshi and technology entrepreneur Afraj Gill for the Liberal nomination on March 4, 2017. Ontario cabinet minister and Markham—Unionville MPP Michael Chan, 2015 Markham—Unionville Liberal candidate Bang-Gu Jiang, businesswoman Sofia Sun, and former city councillor Khalid Usman were rumoured to be possible candidates but all of them ultimately endorsed Ng. Other speculated candidates for the Liberal nomination who did not run included Markham Regional councillor Jack Heath and Markham Mayor Frank Scarpitti.

Liberal nomination contestant and school trustee Juanita Nathan initially ran for her party's nomination but withdrew in protest of the Liberal Party's handling of the nomination process.

Radio host and newspaper columnist Gavan Paranchothy defeated CIBC economist Theodore Antony, former senior Queen's Park staffer Lara Coombs, former Don Valley East MP Joe Daniel, and parental rights advocate John Himanen for the Conservative Party nomination on March 8. Paranchothy previously ran for the party in 2011 in Scarborough Southwest.

Small business owner Gregory Hines defeated insurance broker Marco Coletta for the NDP nomination. Hines previously ran for the party in Markham—Stouffville in 2015.

Independent candidate Above Znoneofthe is a resident of Oshawa, formerly named Sheldon Bergson, who legally changed his name in 2015 so that he could register as a "none of the above" protest candidate in the 2015 federal election; although he did not complete the process in time to register for that election, he first ran in the provincial Whitby—Oshawa by-election of 2016. He has since registered as a candidate in several other provincial and federal by-elections.

The by-election, held on April 3, 2017, was announced on February 22, 2017. The Speaker's warrant regarding the vacancy was received on February 6, 2017; under the Parliament of Canada Act the writ for the by-election had to be issued no earlier than February 17, 2017, and no later than August 5, 2017. The election date must be set to be a Monday at least 36 days after the writ is issued.

Canadian federal by-election, April 3, 2017: Markham—Thornhill Resignation of John McCallum
Party	Candidate	Votes	%	±%
Liberal	Mary Ng	9,856	51.53	−4.19
Conservative	Ragavan Paranchothy	7,501	39.22	+6.91
New Democratic	Gregory Hines	671	3.51	−7.21
Progressive Canadian	Dorian Baxter	566	2.96	
Green	Caryn Bergmann	426	2.23	+0.98
Libertarian	Brendan Thomas Reilly	118	0.62	
Independent	Above Znoneofthe	77	0.40	
Total valid votes/expense limit		19,125	100.0	–
Total rejected ballots			-	
Turnout		27.51		
Eligible voters		69,838		
Liberal hold		Swing		−5.55

=== Saint-Laurent ===
The riding of Saint-Laurent was vacated on February 6, 2017, following the appointment of Liberal MP and former Minister of Foreign Affairs Stéphane Dion as Canada's Ambassador to the European Union and Germany. The riding (previously called Saint-Laurent—Cartierville) has been represented by Dion since 1996, and has been held by the Liberals since its creation in 1988.

Candidates for the Liberal nomination included former Nelligan MNA and provincial cabinet minister Yolande James, and tax law professor Marwah Rizqy, the 2015 Liberal candidate in Hochelaga. Saint-Laurent Borough Mayor and Montreal City Councillor Alan DeSousa intended to run for the nomination but was rejected by the party's nomination committee. In what was seen as a surprising result, both James and Rizqy were defeated for the Liberal nomination by local educator Emmanuella Lambropoulos.

Jimmy Yu, a Conservative Party national councillor, was named the Conservative candidate on March 8. Yu previously ran for the party in the same riding in 2015. Conservative leadership candidate and venture capitalist Rick Peterson had expressed interest in running for the nomination, but declined on March 7.

Mathieu Auclair was named the New Democratic Party's candidate.

William Fayad was named the Bloc Québécois candidate.

Deputy Leader Daniel Green was named the Green Party candidate.

The by-election, held on April 3, 2017, was announced on February 22, 2017. The Speaker's warrant regarding the vacancy was received on February 8, 2017; under the Parliament of Canada Act the writ for the by-election had to be issued no earlier than February 19, 2017, and no later than August 7, 2017. The election date must be set to be a Monday at least 36 days after the writ is issued.

Canadian federal by-election, April 3, 2017: Saint-Laurent Resignation of Stéphane Dion
Party	Candidate	Votes	%	±%
Liberal	Emmanuella Lambropoulos	11,461	59.13	−2.44
Conservative	Jimmy Yu	3,784	19.52	+0.01
Green	Daniel Green	1,548	7.99	+5.57
New Democratic	Mathieu Auclair	1,511	7.80	−3.72
Bloc Québécois	William Fayad	951	4.91	+0.25
Rhinoceros	Chinook Blais-Leduc	129	0.67	–
Total valid votes/expense limit		19,384	100.0	–
Total rejected ballots		255	1.30	+0.30
Turnout		19,639	28.33	−30.65
Eligible voters		69,302		
Liberal hold		Swing		−1.24
Source: lop.parl.ca

== October 23, 2017 by-elections ==
=== Sturgeon River—Parkland ===
The riding of Sturgeon River—Parkland was vacated on July 4, 2017, due to the resignation of Rona Ambrose whose term as interim Conservative Party of Canada leader ended with the election of her successor on May 27, 2017. Ambrose announced her decision to resign to the Conservative Party caucus on May 12, 2017, and her decision was made public on May 15. The suburban Edmonton riding was created for the 2015 federal election and has had Ambrose as its sole MP. It was created predominantly out of the former electoral district of Edmonton—Spruce Grove – for which Ambrose was the MP since its inception at the 2004 federal election – as well as Westlock—St. Paul which was held only by Conservatives from its creation in 2004 until it was abolished in 2015, as well as a small portion from the Yellowhead constituency which has been Conservative since 2003, and was previously held successively by the Progressive Conservatives, Reform Party and Canadian Alliance.

Former parliamentary staffer Dane Lloyd defeated businessman and former 2017 Conservative leadership contestant Rick Peterson, Ambrose constituency staffer Luke Inberg and former Prime Minister's Office staffer Jamie Mozeson for the Conservative nomination. A rumoured candidate for the nomination was Garry Keller, who served as Ambrose's chief of staff. On August 25, Keller declared he would not run for the nomination. The nomination to choose a Conservative candidate was held over two days, September 23 and 24.

University of Alberta professor Brian Gold was acclaimed the Liberal Party candidate. Gold previously ran for the party in 2015 in Edmonton Griesbach.

Medical laboratory technologist Shawna Gawreluck was selected as the NDP candidate.

Educator Ernest Chauvet defeated businessman Kevin Schulthies for the Christian Heritage Party nomination on September 14.

The warrant issued by the Speaker regarding the vacancy was received by the Chief Electoral Officer on July 4, 2017; under the Parliament of Canada Act the writ for a by-election had to be dropped no sooner than August 21, 2017, and no later than December 31, 2017 (11 and 180 days, respectively, from the warrant receipt date). On September 17, 2017, the writ was dropped for a by-election held on October 23, 2017.

Canadian federal by-election, October 23, 2017: Sturgeon River—Parkland Resignation of Rona Ambrose
Party	Candidate	Votes	%	±%	Expenditures
Conservative	Dane Lloyd	16,125	77.36	+7.13	
Liberal	Brian Gold	2,508	12.03	−3.55	
New Democratic	Shawna Gawreluck	1,606	7.70	−2.32	
Christian Heritage	Ernest Chauvet	605	2.90	+1.78	
Total valid votes/Expense limit		20,844			
Total rejected ballots					
Turnout					
Eligible voters					
Conservative hold		Swing		+5.34	
Source: Elections Canada

=== Lac-Saint-Jean ===
The riding of Lac-Saint-Jean was vacated on August 9, 2017, due to the resignation of former Conservative cabinet minister and deputy leader of the Conservative Party, Denis Lebel. Lebel announced his decision to resign on June 19, 2017, saying that his resignation would take effect prior to the beginning of the fall session of parliament. He had been an MP for 10 years, representing Lac-Saint-Jean since its creation in 2015 and the former riding of Roberval—Lac-Saint-Jean from 2007 until 2015. What is now Lac-Saint-Jean was previously represented by the Bloc Québécois from 1993 to 2007 and, provincially, three of the area's five seats are held by the Parti Québécois, while the New Democratic Party was the runner-up in the riding in the past two elections.

Former Roberval city councillor Rémy Leclerc was acclaimed as the Conservative candidate on September 5. Saguenay Mayor Jean Tremblay was speculated to be a candidate for the Conservative nomination, but did not run as the nomination took place before his term as mayor was completed in November 2017.

Psychologist Gisèle Dallaire, the NDP's candidate in this riding in the 2015 election, was acclaimed as her party's candidate on September 25.

Dolbeau-Mistassini Mayor Richard Hébert defeated former Mashteuiatsh vice-chief Marjolaine Étienne for the Liberal nomination on September 7. Desbiens Mayor Nicolas Martel toyed with seeking the Liberal nomination, but ended up declining.

Union official Marc Maltais was named the Bloc Québécois candidate on September 26. Bloc leader Martine Ouellet, who does not have a seat in the House of Commons, ruled out standing as a candidate in the by-election as she is not from the Saguenay–Lac-Saint-Jean region.

Pianist Yves Laporte was named the Green Party candidate on September 28.

The warrant issued by the Speaker regarding the vacancy was received by the Chief Electoral Officer on August 9, 2017; under the Parliament of Canada Act the writ for a by-election had to be dropped no sooner than August 20, 2017, and no later than February 5, 2018 (11 and 180 days, respectively, from the warrant receipt date). On September 17, 2017, the writ was dropped for a by-election held on October 23, 2017.

Canadian federal by-election, October 23, 2017: Lac-Saint-Jean Resignation of Denis Lebel
Party	Candidate	Votes	%	±%	Expenditures
Liberal	Richard Hébert	13,442	38.59	+20.15	
Conservative	Rémy Leclerc	8,710	25.01	−8.26	
Bloc Québécois	Marc Maltais	8,141	23.37	+5.00	
New Democratic	Gisèle Dallaire	4,079	11.71	−16.75	
Green	Yves Laporte	457	1.31	−0.15	
Total valid votes/Expense limit		34,829	98.67		$133,786.71
Total rejected ballots		469	1.33		
Turnout		35,298	41.61		
Eligible voters		84,829			
Liberal gain from Conservative		Swing		+14.20	
Source: Elections Canada

== December 11, 2017 by-elections ==
Writs were dropped on November 5, 2017, for four by-elections that were subsequently held on December 11, 2017:

=== Scarborough—Agincourt ===
A by-election was held in Scarborough—Agincourt as a result of the death of Liberal MP Arnold Chan from nasopharyngeal cancer on September 14, 2017. Chan was first elected in a 2014 by-election and was re-elected in the 2015 general election with 51.9% of the vote. The riding of Scarborough—Agincourt has been held by the Liberals since it was first created for the 1988 federal election with Jim Karygiannis serving as its MP until his retirement in 2014.

Jean Yip, Chan's widow, defeated Gordon Lam for the Liberal nomination on November 12. Ward 39 (Scarborough Agincourt – North) city councillor and former Scarborough—Agincourt MP Jim Karygiannis declined to run for the nomination, but threw his support to Yip.

Investment banker Dasong Zou defeated the riding's Conservative candidate in the 2008 federal election, physician Benson Lau for the Conservative nomination. York Region District School Board Trustee Allan Tam as well as former teacher and immigration officer Sarah Chung were both rejected by the party. Tam did not apply before the deadline and Chung was disqualified on two different occasions.

Scarborough-born federal NDP leader and former GTA MPP Jagmeet Singh, who does not have a seat in the House of Commons, ruled out standing as a candidate in the by-election. On November 19, reporter Brian Chang was acclaimed the NDP candidate.

Rumoured candidates for the Liberal nomination who ultimately did not run included Liberal Scarborough Centre MPP Brad Duguid, Toronto City Council staffer Nick Mantas, Ontario Progressive Conservative staffer Hratch Aynedijan, Ward 36 (Scarborough Southwest – South) city councillor and former provincial Progressive Conservative candidate Gary Crawford, and Liberal Scarborough—Agincourt MPP Soo Wong.

The Speaker's warrant regarding the vacancy was received on September 19, 2017; under the Parliament of Canada Act the writ for a by-election had to be dropped no later than March 18, 2018, 180 days after the Chief Electoral Officer was officially notified of the vacancy via a warrant issued by the Speaker.

Canadian federal by-election, December 11, 2017: Scarborough—Agincourt Death of Arnold Chan
Party	Candidate	Votes	%	±%
Liberal	Jean Yip	9,091	49.44	−2.50
Conservative	Dasong Zou	7,448	40.51	+2.48
New Democratic	Brian Chang	931	5.06	−2.79
Christian Heritage	Jude Coutinho	371	2.02	+1.21
Green	Michael DiPasquale	253	1.38	+0.00
Independent	Tom Zhu	148	0.80	
Independent	John Turmel	145	0.79	
Total valid votes/Expense limit		18,387	100.00	
Total rejected ballots				
Turnout		18,387	26.74	−32.68
Eligible voters		68,775		
Liberal hold		Swing		−2.49

=== Bonavista—Burin—Trinity ===
The riding of Bonavista—Burin—Trinity was vacated effective September 30, 2017, following the resignation of Judy Foote, Minister of Public Services and Procurement, from cabinet on August 24, 2017, and her resignation from parliament due to an illness in her family on September 30.

Centreville-Wareham-Trinity Mayor and former president of the Federation of Municipalities in Newfoundland and Labrador Churence Rogers defeated comedian Pete Soucy, provincial and federal Liberal party organizer Larry Guinchard, RCMP officer Dale Foote, and North Harbour farmer, former search and rescue coordinator, and 2008 Conservative Party candidate in St. John's South—Mount Pearl Merv Wiseman for the Liberal nomination.

Teacher and guidance counselor Mike Windsor was named the Conservative candidate. Windsor previously ran for the party in 2015 in the riding.

Tyler James Downey was named the NDP candidate.

Rumoured candidates for the Liberal nomination who ultimately did not run included former Progressive Conservative MHA Darin King and current Liberal MHAs Steve Crocker, Carol Anne Haley, and Dale Kirby. On September 22, 2017, MHA Mark Browne announced he would not be seeking the nomination. Lawyer Stacy MacDonald initially sought the Liberal nomination but withdrew on September 28.

In the 2015 federal election, Foote won the newly created riding with 81% of the vote, the highest percentage of vote taken by a candidate nationally in that election.

The Speaker's warrant regarding the vacancy was received on October 3, 2017; under the Parliament of Canada Act the writ for a by-election had to be dropped no later than April 1, 2018, 180 days after the Chief Electoral Officer was officially notified of the vacancy via a warrant issued by the Speaker.

Canadian federal by-election, December 11, 2017: Bonavista—Burin—Trinity Resignation of Judy Foote
Party	Candidate	Votes	%	±%
Liberal	Churence Rogers	8,717	69.22	−12.58
Conservative	Mike Windsor	2,878	22.85	+12.78
New Democratic	Tyler James Downey	598	4.75	−2.54
Libertarian	Shane Stapleton	262	2.08	N/A
Green	Tyler Colbourne	138	1.10	+0.25
Total valid votes/Expense limit		12,593	100.00	
Total rejected ballots				
Turnout		12,593	21.43	−35.94
Eligible voters		58,771		
Liberal hold		Swing		−12.68

=== South Surrey—White Rock ===
The riding of South Surrey—White Rock was vacated on September 30, 2017, after Conservative MP Dianne Watts announced on September 24, 2017, that she would be resigning her seat to enter provincial politics and seek the leadership of the British Columbia Liberal Party.

Former federal cabinet minister and Delta—Richmond East MP Kerry-Lynne Findlay defeated Fraser Institute policy analyst and former BC Liberal staffer David Hunt and police officer Bryan Tepper for the Conservative Party nomination.

Former White Rock Mayor and Surrey-White Rock MLA Gordie Hogg was acclaimed as the Liberal Party candidate. A rumoured candidate for the nomination was Judith Higginbotham, a former Surrey city councillor and the riding's Liberal candidate in the 2015 federal election.

Mortgage broker Jonathan Silveira was acclaimed the NDP candidate on November 19.

The Speaker's warrant regarding the vacancy was received on October 3, 2017; under the Parliament of Canada Act the writ for a by-election had to be dropped no later than April 1, 2018, 180 days after the Chief Electoral Officer was officially notified of the vacancy via a warrant issued by the Speaker.

Canadian federal by-election, December 11, 2017: South Surrey—White Rock Resignation of Dianne Watts
Party	Candidate	Votes	%	±%	Expenditures
Liberal	Gordie Hogg	14,369	47.37	+5.89	$88,736.12
Conservative	Kerry-Lynne Findlay	12,824	42.28	–1.75	$87,702.59
New Democratic	Jonathan Silveira	1,478	4.87	–5.54	$14,166.92
Green	Larry Colero	1,247	4.11	+0.69	$2,586.08
Christian Heritage	Rod Taylor	238	0.78	–	$9,833.08
Libertarian	Donald Wilson	89	0.29	–0.17	none listed
Progressive Canadian	Michael Huenefeld	86	0.28	+0.09	$508.36
Total valid votes/expense limit		30,331	99.83	–	$102,950.75
Total rejected ballots		52	0.17	–0.21	
Turnout		30,383	38.14	–35.85	
Eligible voters		79,653			
Liberal gain from Conservative		Swing		+3.82	
Source: Elections Canada

=== Battlefords—Lloydminster ===
On August 30, 2017, it was reported that Battlefords—Lloydminster MP Gerry Ritz had asked not to be included in the reshuffled Conservative shadow cabinet. Ritz confirmed the next day that he would resign from parliament. The seat was vacated on October 2, 2017.

Ritz had been Battlefords—Lloydminster's only Member of Parliament, holding the riding since its creation for the 1997 election, first as a Reform Party of Canada MP, then on behalf of the Canadian Alliance and since 2003 as a Conservative. He served as Agriculture Minister in Stephen Harper's cabinet from 2007 to 2015.

Former parliamentary staffer Rosemarie Falk defeated Langham Mayor John Hildebrand, small business owner Aron Klassen, Kindersley CAO Bernie Morton, and farmer Richard Nelson to win the Conservative nomination. Meadow Lake MLA and former Desnethé—Missinippi—Churchill River MP Jeremy Harrison was rumoured to be a candidate for the Conservative nomination, but did not make his intentions known before the cut-off date to join the race.

Rodeo cowboy and rancher Ken Finlayson's bid for the Conservative nomination was rejected by the party over concern that he was not a "team player". Finlayson ran as an independent.

Professional MMA fighter and athlete Matt Fedler was named the NDP candidate.

Contractor and former RM of Mervin councillor Larry Ingram was acclaimed as the Liberal Party candidate. Ingram previously ran for the party in Battlefords—Lloydminster in 2015.

The Speaker's warrant regarding the vacancy was received on October 3, 2017; under the Parliament of Canada Act the writ for a by-election had to be dropped no later than April 1, 2018, 180 days after the Chief Electoral Officer was officially notified of the vacancy via a warrant issued by the Speaker.

Canadian federal by-election, December 11, 2017: Battlefords—Lloydminster Resignation of Gerry Ritz
Party	Candidate	Votes	%	±%
Conservative	Rosemarie Falk	8,965	69.56	+8.55
New Democratic	Matt Fedler	1,698	13.17	−4.44
Liberal	Larry Ingram	1,345	10.44	−6.04
Independent	Ken Finlayson	681	5.28	
Green	Yvonne Potter-Pihach	200	1.55	−0.16
Total valid votes/Expense limit		12,889	100.00	
Total rejected ballots				
Turnout		12,889	27.05	−39.46
Eligible voters		47,651		
Conservative hold		Swing		+6.49

== June 18, 2018 by-election ==
=== Chicoutimi—Le Fjord ===
A by-election was held in Chicoutimi—Le Fjord following the announcement by Liberal MP Denis Lemieux on November 6, 2017, that he would be resigning his seat for family reasons; his resignation took effect on December 1, 2017. Lemieux was first elected in the 2015 federal election with 31.1% of the vote, narrowly defeating NDP incumbent Dany Morin.

Port Saguenay board member Lina Boivin, who was endorsed by Lemieux, defeated former Saint-Charles de Bourget mayor Michel Ringuette for the Liberal nomination, held in May 2018. A rumoured candidate for the Liberal nomination was former Paralympic athlete and head of university sport at UQAC, Philippe Gagnon. Former municipal councillor and former Quebec Liberal MNA candidate Joan Simard, local businessman Simon-Pierre Murdock, who later endorsed Boivin, and Chicoutimi-Nord Municipal Councillor Marc Pettersen declined to run for the nomination. "Promotion Saguenay" Director of Industrial Development and Corporate Affairs Claude Bouchard had his candidacy rejected by the federal Liberal party.

Éric Dubois, a union advisor at the CSN and former federal NDP candidate, was acclaimed as the NDP candidate on January 22, 2018. Dany Morin and former Ontario MPP and federal NDP leader Jagmeet Singh both expressed interest in running for the nomination but decided against it.

Catherine Bouchard-Tremblay was acclaimed as the candidate for the Bloc Québécois on May 18, 2018. Former Dubuc PQ MNA Jean-Marie Claveau and teacher Valérie Tremblay were rumoured to be interested in running for the Bloc Québécois nomination. Former Chicoutimi—Le Fjord BQ MP Robert Bouchard, Saguenay firefighter Mario Gagnon, and UQAC political science professor Michel Roche declined to run for the nomination.

Two-time Ron Lapointe Trophy winning QMJHL coach Richard Martel was named the Conservative candidate on December 20, 2017.

Lynda Youde was acclaimed as the candidate for the Green Party on May 22, 2018.

The short-lived « Groupe parlementaire québécois » / « Québec debout », formed by seven Members of Parliament after they left the Bloc Québécois, considered nominating a candidate but failed to do so.

The Speaker's warrant regarding the vacancy was received on December 4, 2017; under the Parliament of Canada Act the writ for a by-election had to be dropped no later than June 2, 2018, 180 days after the Chief Electoral Officer was officially notified of the vacancy via a warrant issued by the Speaker. On May 13, 2018, the writ was dropped for a by-election for June 18, 2018.

Canadian federal by-election, June 18, 2018: Chicoutimi—Le Fjord Resignation of Denis Lemieux
Party	Candidate	Votes	%	±%
Conservative	Richard Martel	12,580	52.73	+36.13
Liberal	Lina Boivin	7,032	29.48	-1.61
New Democratic	Éric Dubois	2,065	8.66	-21.06
Bloc Québécois	Catherine Bouchard-Tremblay	1,337	5.60	-14.92
Green	Lynda Youde	736	3.09	+1.02
Independent	John "The Engineer" Turmel	104	0.44	
Total valid votes/Expense limit		23,854	100.00	
Total rejected ballots				
Turnout		36.06%		
Eligible voters		66,152		
Conservative gain from Liberal		Swing		+18.87

== December 3, 2018 by-election ==
=== Leeds—Grenville—Thousand Islands and Rideau Lakes ===
The seat for the electoral district of Leeds—Grenville—Thousand Islands and Rideau Lakes has been vacant since May 2, 2018 when Conservative MP Gord Brown died of a heart attack in his Parliament Hill office in Ottawa.

Colin Brown, Brown's nephew, announced his candidacy for the Conservative nomination and was quickly endorsed by Doug Ford. In addition, Edwardsburgh/Cardinal town councillor and federal riding association president Michael Barrett, government-relations specialist Stephanie Mitton, and Anne Johnston, a former aide to Leeds—Grenville—Thousand Islands and Rideau Lakes MPP Steve Clark also ran for the Conservative nomination. Former Canadian Senator and interim Leader of the Opposition in the Ontario Legislature Bob Runciman was rumoured to be interested in seeking the Conservative nomination for the by-election but decided against it after his wife encountered some health issues. Barrett won the nomination at a local party convention at the Brockville Memorial Centre on August 11 in a contest that ran to a fourth ballot.

2015 Liberal candidate Mary Jean McFall – a lawyer, former Brockville city councillor and immediate former Chief of Staff to Agriculture Minister Lawrence MacAulay – won the Liberal nomination for this by-election unopposed.

Michelle Taylor is the NDP candidate; Taylor ran for the Ontario NDP in Leeds—Grenville—Thousand Islands and Rideau Lakes in the 2018 provincial election.

Lorraine Rekmans, the Green candidate for this riding in 2015, will again run for the party.

The Speaker's warrant regarding the vacancy was received on May 3, 2018; under the Parliament of Canada Act the writ for a by-election had to be dropped no later than October 30, 2018, 180 days after the Chief Electoral Officer was officially notified of the vacancy via a warrant issued by the Speaker. On October 28, 2018, the writ was dropped for a by-election for December 3, 2018.

Canadian federal by-election, December 3, 2018: Leeds—Grenville—Thousand Islands and Rideau Lakes Death of Gord Brown
Party	Candidate	Votes	%	±%
Conservative	Michael Barrett	16,865	57.8	+10.45
Liberal	Mary Jean McFall	10,443	35.8	-4.75
New Democratic	Michelle Taylor	883	3.0	-5.34
Green	Lorraine Rekmans	859	2.9	-0.75
Independent	John Turmel	111	0.4	
Total valid votes/Expense limit		29,161	100.00	
Total rejected ballots				
Turnout		35.89%		
Eligible voters		81,247		

== February 25, 2019 by-elections ==
=== Burnaby South ===
NDP MP Kennedy Stewart announced at a press conference at Vancouver's Harbour Centre on May 10, 2018, that he would be resigning his seat of Burnaby South during parliament's summer recess to run as an independent candidate for Mayor of Vancouver in the 2018 municipal election (since the incumbent mayor, Gregor Robertson, was not seeking another term). On August 2, Stewart publicly released his letter to the Speaker of House, Geoff Regan, confirming his resignation, effective September 14, 2018. At the May 10 press conference, Stewart expressed support for former Ontario MPP and federal NDP leader Jagmeet Singh to replace him. Singh confirmed his candidacy on August 8.

2015 Liberal candidate Adam Pankratz, a commercial banker with a local credit union, stated that he was undecided, but ultimately decided against running again.

Biotechnology scientist Cyrus Eduljee and multiple daycare centre owner and operator Karen Wang both sought the Liberal nomination. On December 29, 2018, Wang won the Liberal Party nomination. Wang resigned as the Liberal candidate on January 16, 2019 after it was reported that she had posted racist comments on the Chinese-language social media platform WeChat encouraging voters to vote for her as the "only Chinese candidate" while singling out Singh as being of "Indian descent." Former Burnaby North MLA Richard Lee was named by the Liberals as their candidate on January 19.

Corporate lawyer Jay Shin is the Conservative candidate.

On August 16, the Green Party announced that they would not run a candidate in the by-election as a courtesy to Singh.

The People's Party announced Laura-Lynn Tyler Thompson as their candidate.

Rex Brocki was announced as the candidate of the Libertarian Party, but he did not register.

Valentine Wu has announced his intention of running as an independent candidate.

The Speaker's warrant regarding the vacancy was received on September 17, 2018; under the Parliament of Canada Act the writ for a by-election had to be dropped no later than March 18, 2019, 180 days after the Chief Electoral Officer was officially notified of the vacancy via a warrant issued by the Speaker. The by-election was called on January 9, 2019 to be held on February 25, 2019.

Canadian federal by-election, February 25, 2019: Burnaby South Resignation of Kennedy Stewart
Party	Candidate	Votes	%	±%	Expenditures
New Democratic	Jagmeet Singh	8,848	38.86	+3.79	$107,876.69
Liberal	Richard Lee	5,919	26.00	–7.88	$120,398.75
Conservative	Jay Shin	5,147	22.61	–4.51	$124,688.15
People's	Laura-Lynn Tyler Thompson	2,422	10.64	–	$87,790.22
Independent	Terry Grimwood	242	1.06	–	$5,983.61
Independent	Valentine Wu	190	0.84	–	$704.17
Total valid votes/expense limit		22,768	99.17	–	$132,377.49
Total rejected ballots		190	0.83	+0.23	
Turnout		22,958	29.96	–30.82	
Eligible voters		76,618			
New Democratic hold		Swing		+5.84	
Source: Elections Canada

== May 6, 2019 by-election ==
=== Nanaimo—Ladysmith ===
NDP MP Sheila Malcolmson, first elected in 2015, resigned her seat of Nanaimo—Ladysmith, effective January 2, 2019, to enter provincial politics as a by-election candidate for the British Columbia New Democratic Party in the riding of Nanaimo following the resignation of MLA Leonard Krog.

The Speaker's warrant regarding the vacancy was received on January 7, 2019; under the Parliament of Canada Act the writ for a by-election has to be dropped no later than July 6, 2019, 180 days after the Chief Electoral Officer was officially notified of the vacancy via a warrant issued by the Speaker. On March 24, 2019 the Prime Minister announced the by-election for May 6, 2019.

The New Democratic Party candidate was selected at a nomination meeting on March 30, 2019. Candidates for the nomination were Kwikwasutʼinuxw Haxwaʼmis First Nation chief and Union of British Columbia Indian Chiefs vice-president Bob Chamberlin, consultant Maeve O'Byrne, activist Lauren Semple, and outreach worker Fred Statham. Bob Chamberlin won the nomination.

The Liberal Party announced Michelle Corfield as their candidate on March 16, 2019.

John Hirst won the Conservative nomination on November 17, 2018. Hirst defeated Jennifer Clarke, who subsequently won the nomination for the People's Party of Canada.

Paul Manly was acclaimed as the candidate of the Green Party in January 2019. Manly was the Green candidate in this riding in the 2015 election, winning almost 20% of the vote in one of the party's best performances nationally.

The National Citizens Alliance ran Jakob Letkemann in the by-election.

The Progressive Canadian Party ran Brian Marlatt in the by-election.

Canadian federal by-election, May 6, 2019: Nanaimo—Ladysmith Resignation of Sheila Malcolmson
Party	Candidate	Votes	%	±%
Green	Paul Manly	15,188	37.3%	
Conservative	John Hirst	10,093	24.8%	
New Democratic	Bob Chamberlin	9,392	23.1%	
Liberal	Michelle Corfield	4,478	11.0%	
People's	Jennifer Clarke	1,246	3.4%	
Progressive Canadian	Brian Marlatt	248	0.6%	
National Citizens Alliance	Jakob Letkemann	66	0.2%	
Total valid votes/Expense limit		40,711	100.00	
Total rejected ballots				
Turnout		40,711	40.95%	
Eligible voters		99,413		
Green gain from New Democratic		Swing		

== Other vacancies ==
Under an amendment to the Parliament of Canada Act which came into force on January 19, 2019, no writ for the election of a member of the House shall be issued if the vacancy occurs less than nine months before the date fixed under the Canada Elections Act for the holding of a general election. This amendment means that any seats becoming vacant after January 21, 2019, would remain vacant until the general election of October 21, 2019.

=== Saint-Léonard—Saint-Michel ===
Nicola Di Iorio, Liberal MP for Saint-Léonard—Saint-Michel, announced his plan to leave politics for unspecified family reasons on April 25, 2018. His stated intent was to resign during the summer of 2018, but he rescinded his resignation after the Liberal Party denied his request to personally appoint the party's candidate for the ensuing by-election. After facing criticism for his absence from parliament, he again announced his intention to resign, this time effective January 22, 2019. However, Di Iorio missed the deadline he set for himself and did not submit his resignation for another week, on January 29. As Di Iorio's resignation became effective after the deadline, no by-election was held in this riding.

=== Kings—Hants ===
Liberal MP Scott Brison resigned from cabinet in January 2019 and as MP for Kings—Hants effective February 10, 2019. As Brison's resignation became effective after the deadline, no by-election was held in this riding.

=== Langley—Aldergrove ===
Conservative MP Mark Warawa (Langley—Aldergrove) died of cancer on June 20, 2019. As Warawa's death occurred after the deadline for by-elections to be held, no by-election was held in this riding.

=== Calgary Forest Lawn ===
Conservative MP Deepak Obhrai (Calgary Forest Lawn) died of liver cancer on August 2, 2019. As Obhrai's death occurred after the deadline for by-elections to be held, no by-election was held in this riding.

== See also ==
- List of federal by-elections in Canada
