= 2016 Medicine Hat—Cardston—Warner federal by-election =

← 2015	October 24, 2016	2019 →

Riding of Medicine Hat—Cardston—Warner
- Registered: 76,911
- Turnout: 44.54% (▼21.57%)
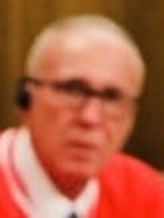
	First party	Second party
		LPC
Candidate	Glen Motz	Stan Sakamoto
Party	Conservative	Liberal
Popular vote	23,932	8,778
Percentage	69.85%	25.62%
Swing	▲1.05%	▲7.68%
MP before election
Jim Hillyer
Conservative
Elected MP
Glen Motz
Conservative

A by-election was held in the federal riding of Medicine Hat—Cardston—Warner in Alberta, Canada, on 24 October 2016 following the death of Conservative MP Jim Hillyer. The safe seat was held by the Conservative candidate Glen Motz on a reduced majority.

The by-election was the first to be held in the 42nd Canadian Parliament.

== Background ==
=== Constituency ===
The constituency covers the City of Medicine Hat and surrounding areas in the southeast corner and southern U.S. border region of Alberta, including Cypress County, the County of Forty Mile No. 8, Warner No. 5 and the Town of Warner, and Cardston County and the Town of Cardston.

=== Representation ===
The riding has been held by centre-right parties since Bert Hargrave defeated Liberal incumbent Bud Olson, himself a former Social Credit MP, in 1972. This was the first by-election in the 108-year history of the Medicine Hat constituency. The seat was vacated on March 23, 2016, when Conservative Party of Canada MP Jim Hillyer died in his office following a heart attack.

== Campaign ==
The Speaker's warrant regarding the vacancy was received on March 24, 2016.

== Candidates ==
Retired Medicine Hat Police inspector Glen Motz defeated businessman Brian Benoit, former Cardston-Taber-Warner and Calgary-Glenmore MLA Paul Hinman, lawyer Michael W. Jones, and party worker Joe Schow for the Conservative nomination, which was held in late June. Cypress-Medicine Hat MLA Drew Barnes, former Medicine Hat MLA Blake Pedersen, and Dan Hein, Hillyer's closest competitor for the nomination in 2015, all declined to run for the Conservative nomination despite speculation to the contrary.

Well-known Medicine Hat businessman Stan Sakamoto was the Liberal candidate.

The Libertarian Party of Canada nominated Sheldon Johnston as its candidate. The Libertarians and the Rhinoceros Party nominated candidates for the first time in Medicine Hat.

== Results ==
Canadian federal by-election, October 24, 2016: Medicine Hat—Cardston—Warner Death of Jim Hillyer
Party	Candidate	Votes	%	±%
Conservative	Glen Motz	23,932	69.85	+1.05
Liberal	Stan Sakamoto	8,778	25.62	+7.68
Christian Heritage	Rod Taylor	702	2.05	
New Democratic	Beverly Ann Waege	353	1.03	−8.64
Libertarian	Sheldon Johnston	284	0.83	
Rhinoceros	Kayne Cooper	211	0.62	
Total valid votes/expense limit		34,260	100.00	–
Total rejected ballots			-	
Turnout			44.54	
Eligible voters		76,911		
Conservative hold		Swing		−3.32
Sources: Elections Canada

== 2015 result ==
2015 Canadian federal election
Party	Candidate	Votes	%	±%	Expenditures
Conservative	Jim Hillyer	34,849	68.80	+0.10	$54,953.54
Liberal	Glen Allan	9,085	17.94	+6.78	$15,408.61
New Democratic	Erin Weir	4,897	9.67	-5.27	$9,291.81
Green	Brent Smith	1,319	2.60	-1.84	$741.29
Independent	John Clayton Turner	500	0.99		$4,050.57
Total valid votes/Expense limit		50,650	100.00		$237,057.33
Total rejected ballots		118	0.23	–	
Turnout		50,768	66.11	–	
Eligible voters		76,789			
Conservative hold		Swing		-3.34	
Source: Elections Canada
