= Iddesleigh, Alberta =

Iddesleigh
- Hamlet
- Location of Iddesleigh Iddesleigh (Canada)
- Coordinates: 50°44′08″N 111°18′11″W
- Country: Canada
- Province: Alberta
- Region: Southern Alberta
- Census division: 4
- Special area: Special Area No. 2

Government
  - Type: Unincorporated
  - Governing body: Special Areas Board

Population (1991)
  - Total: 14
- Time zone: UTC−06:00 (Alberta Time)
- Area codes: 403, 587, 825

Iddesleigh is a hamlet in southern Alberta, Canada within Special Area No. 2. It is located approximately 37 kilometres (23 mi) northeast of Highway 1 and 46 kilometres (29 mi) northeast of Brooks.

== Toponymy ==
Iddesleigh is named for Walter Northcote, 2nd Earl of Iddesleigh, chairman of the Hudson’s Bay Company from 1869 to 1874.

== Topography ==
Iddesleigh rests upon one of the densest dinosaur bone beds on Earth. Between 1974 and 2025, thousands of pachyrhinosaurus specimens have been unearthed in the area.

== History ==
=== Pre-settlement ===
Following the Great Sioux War of 1876 in the United States, a conflict between an alliance of Lakota Sioux and Northern Cheyenne against the United States, thousands of Sioux took refuge in the area now known as Iddesleigh. Among them was Sitting Bull, who met with the Crowfoot of the Blackfoot people, and attempted to convince Crowfoot to join their resistance by mounting an uprising against the North-West Mounted Police. Crowfoot declined, but convinced the Blackfoot to leave the Sioux in peace.

=== Founding: 1900-1920 ===
In 1907, the first settlers arrived in the area that would later become known as Iddesleigh. They established a blend of ranches and grain farms over the next few decades. The locality was originally served by the now-extant community of Rainy Hills (which was also briefly known as Denhart). Rainy Hills Cemetery began serving both the residents of Denhart and Iddesleigh in 1911.

In 1914, Iddesleigh was founded as a siding of the Canadian Pacific Railway along the Bassano subdivision. The next year, Rainy Hills Church was established to serve the local Lutheran community, and an Iddesleigh post office opened in December 1915. A grain elevator was introduced to the community by the end of the decade.

Iddesleigh grew rapidly into a local commercial centre by 1920, hosting services including a barber and various stores. Iddesleigh School District No. 3608 was established on February 18, 1918. Classes were initially offered in a hall owned by the United Farmers of Alberta.

=== Decline: 1920s-1960 ===
As with many dry belt towns, Iddesleigh experienced depopulation throughout the 1920s, as poor weather and crop yields prompted residents to leave in search of better agricultural conditions. One resident reported salvaging just 45 bushels of wheat from 300 acres in 1924. Residents primarily moved to settlements within the County of Paintearth No. 18.

Notable resident Bud Olson, future member of Parliament for Medicine Hat, was born in Iddesleigh in 1925. He operated the family farm and general store in Iddesleigh until 1956; he subsequently donated the building to serve as a local pioneer museum, which was operated by the Rainy Hills Historical Society until around the late 1980s.

Iddesleigh School received a permanent building in 1939. The school shut down by 1960, as the building was sold that year. As of 2019, the building now hosts Iddesleigh Hall, a community centre.

In 1967, Iddesleigh was one of several small hamlets in Alberta that hosted a parade to celebrate Canada's centennial.

=== Later developments: 1961-present ===
Farmers based in Iddesleigh and Jenner formed the Rainy Hills Grazing Co-op in June 1967, in order to purchase 2,800 acres of farmland from the provincial government. As of 2022, the co-operative is still active.

Train services through Iddesleigh ended some time after 1983. In 1984, Rainy Hills Lutheran Church congregants were among the contributors to a cookbook published by the Lutheran Women's Missionary League, Family Favourites. Rainy Hills Lutheran Church celebrated its centennial in 2015.

In November 2022, the largest solar power field proposed for Southern Alberta was approved by provincial regulators. Once completed, Greengate Power’s Jurassic Solar + Battery plant will span 1,170 acres, near Iddesleigh.

== Demographics ==
Iddesleigh recorded a population of 14 in the 1991 Census of Population conducted by Statistics Canada, down from 22 in 1988.

== Notable people ==
- Bud Olson (1925 – 2002) – member of Parliament for Medicine Hat 14th lieutenant governor of Alberta; born and raised in Iddesleigh

== See also ==
- List of communities in Alberta
- List of hamlets in Alberta
