= Archibald Mitchell =

Archibald Mitchell may refer to:

- Archie Mitchell (footballer) (1885–1949), English footballer and manager
- Archibald Hugh Mitchell (1903–1986), Canadian farmer, military officer and politician

== See also ==
- Archie Mitchell (disambiguation)
