= Frederick William Gershaw =

Canadian politician

The Honourable Frederick William Gershaw
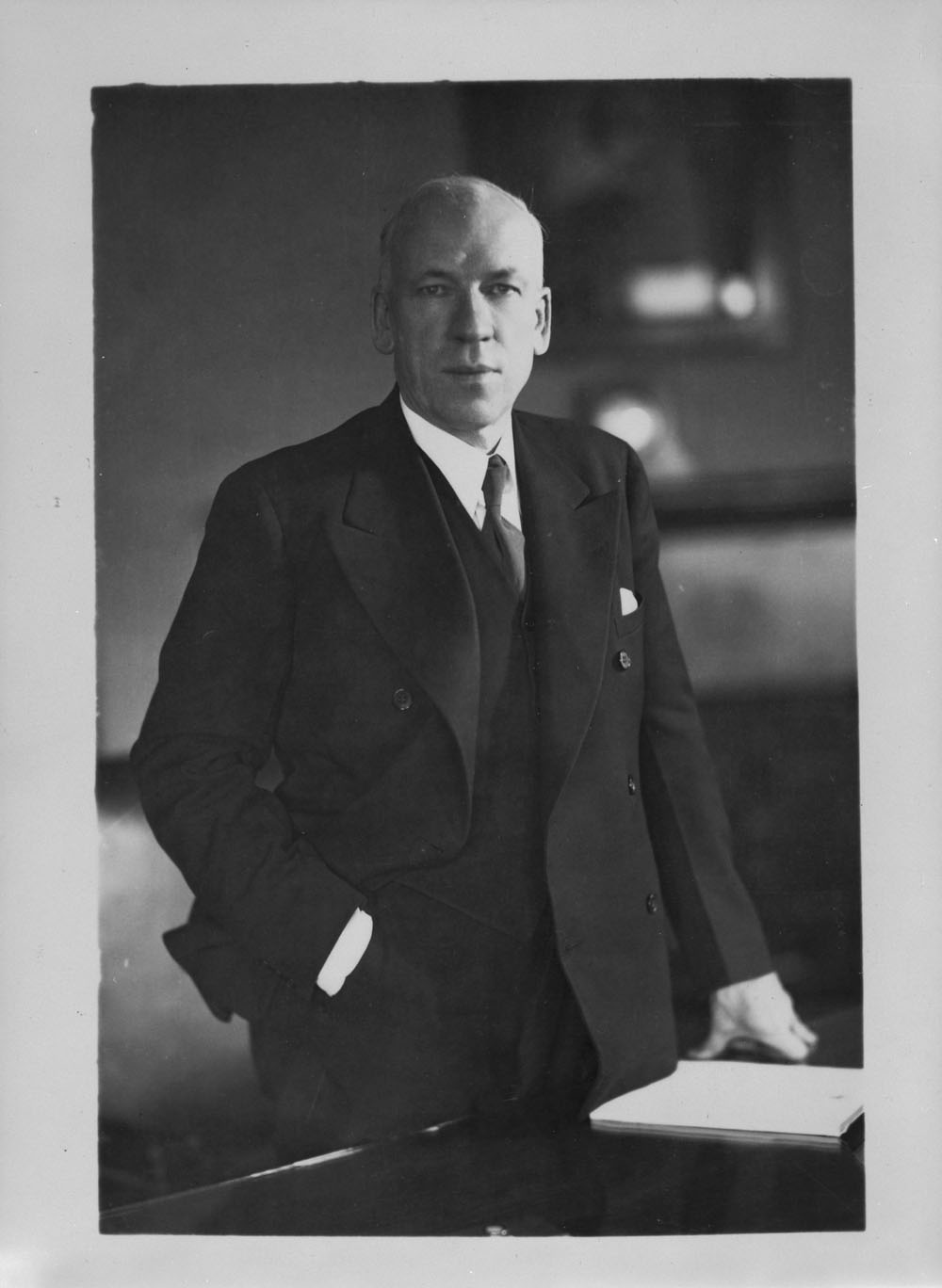

Member of Parliament for Medicine Hat
- In office 1925–1935
- Preceded by: Robert Gardiner
- Succeeded by: Archibald Hugh Mitchell
- In office 1940–1945
- Preceded by: Archibald Hugh Mitchell
- Succeeded by: William Duncan Wylie

Canadian Senator from Alberta
- In office 1945–1968
- Appointed by: William Lyon Mackenzie King

Personal details
- Born: 11 April 1883 Emerson, Manitoba, Canada
- Died: 26 June 1968 (aged 85)
- Party: Liberal

Frederick William Gershaw (11 April 1883 – 26 June 1968) was a Canadian physician and politician.

== Background ==
Born in Emerson, Manitoba, he received a Doctor of Medicine from the University of Manitoba in 1911. He became a medical officer for the Canadian Pacific Railway and moved to Medicine Hat, Alberta. In 1912, he married Harriet Robinson, a registered nurse. They had 4 daughters: Margaret, Edith, Norma, and Lorraine.

He first ran unsuccessfully for the House of Commons of Canada in the riding of Medicine Hat in the 1921 federal election. A Liberal, he was elected in the 1925 federal election and re-elected in 1926 and 1930. He was defeated in 1935 and was re-elected in 1940. He was appointed to the Senate of Canada in 1945 representing the senatorial division of Medicine Hat. He resigned in 1968 shortly before his death.

Senator Gershaw School in Bow Island, Alberta is named in his honour, in addition to Gershaw Drive Southwest in Medicine Hat – an urban limited-access road carrying portions of Highway 41A and Highway 3.
