= Edwin William Brunsden =

Canadian politician

Edwin William Brunsden (born: 10 December 1896 Snodland, Kent, England – died: 28 September 1976) was an agent, a journalist, and an agrologist. He saw combat in World War I and served as a Canadian federal politician from 1958 to 1962.

Edwin William Brunsden (given the name Edwin William Wallis at birth) was born 10 December 1896 in Snodland, Kent, England, to Jane Amelia Brunsden and Thomas Richard Wallis., Brunsden was raised by his aunt and uncle Ellen Scott and Edwin Samuel Brunsden. The Brunsden family immigrated to Canada. Brunsden served overseas in World War I from 1915 to 1918. He served with the 29th Infantry Battalion. He married Alice Kathleen Adams in 1928.

Brunsden first ran for a seat in the House of Commons of Canada in the 1957 federal election. He was defeated by Social Credit candidate Horace Olson. Parliament would be dissolved a year later and Brunsden and Olson would face each other in the 1958 federal election with Edwin defeating Olson in a hotly contested election. Olson would run against Brunsden for a third time in the 1962 federal election. In that election Olson would defeat Brunsden. A year later the Liberal minority government would fall forcing the 1963 federal election. Brunsden would attempt win back his seat and run against Olson for the 4th time, Olson defeated him again, and he retired from federal politics.

Parliament of Canada
Preceded by Horace Olson	Member of Parliament Medicine Hat; 1958–1962	Succeeded by Horace Olson
