= William Duncan Wylie =

Canadian politician

William Duncan McKay Wylie

Member of Parliament for Medicine Hat
- In office 1945–1957
- Preceded by: Frederick William Gershaw
- Succeeded by: Bud Olson

Personal details
- Born: 1 April 1900 Kirriemuir, Forfarshire, Scotland
- Died: 21 December 1981 (aged 81) Edmonton, Alberta, Canada
- Party: Social Credit
- Profession: farmer, public servant

William Duncan McKay Wylie (1 April 1900 – 21 December 1981) was a farmer, public servant and Canadian federal politician.

Wylie first ran for a seat in the House of Commons of Canada as a Social Credit Party candidate in the 1945 federal election. He defeated 3 other candidates by a comfortable margin to win the electoral district of Medicine Hat and his 1st term in office. Wylie would run for re-election in the 1949 federal election, he would be re-elected in a landslide winning the largest plurality of his career. Wylie would attempt to run for a 3rd term and be re-elected in the 1953 federal election. He would be nearly defeated by Liberal candidate Harry Veiner. Wylie served out his last term and retired in 1957. Wylie died in Edmonton in 1981.
