= Robert Harold Porter =

Canadian politician (1933–2018)

Member of Parliament for Medicine Hat
- In office 1984–1993
- Preceded by: Bert Hargrave
- Succeeded by: Monte Solberg

Personal details
- Born: 14 August 1933 Medicine Hat, Alberta, Canada
- Died: 10 September 2018 (aged 85) Medicine Hat, Alberta, Canada
- Party: Progressive Conservative
- Relations: MacKenzie Porter, Kalan Porter, Kelsey Porter
- Profession: Businessman, farmer, rancher

Robert Harold Porter (14 August 1933 – 10 September 2018) was a Canadian politician who was a lifelong member of the Progressive Conservative party and a member of the House of Commons.

He represented the Alberta riding of Medicine Hat where he was first elected in the 1984 federal election and re-elected in 1988, therefore becoming a member in the 33rd and 34th Canadian Parliaments.

Porter left federal politics in 1993 and did not campaign for a third term in Parliament. He died in September 2018 at the age of 85.

He is the grandfather of Canadian Idol star and pop singer Kalan Porter and actress and country singer MacKenzie Porter.
