= LaVar Payne =

Canadian politician

Member of Parliament for Medicine Hat
- In office October 14, 2008 – August 4, 2015
- Preceded by: Monte Solberg
- Succeeded by: Jim Hillyer

Personal details
- Born: February 23, 1945 (age 81) Lethbridge, Alberta
- Party: Conservative
- Spouse: Micheline Payne
- Profession: Human resources, consultant

LaVar Payne (born February 23, 1945) is a Canadian politician who represented the electoral district of Medicine Hat from 2008 until 2015. He is a member of the Conservative Party.

== Before politics ==
Payne worked as a human resources manager for Alberta Gas Chemicals, Novacor and Methanex. He managed his own consulting company, Solution Source, and provided career counseling services to Right Management.

== Political career ==
Before his election as Member of Parliament in 2008, Payne was special assistant to Monte Solberg, Minister of Human Resources and Skills Development. Payne has worked and volunteered with various organizations in Medicine Hat and served as president of the board of the Medicine Hat Conservative riding association from 2000 to 2008. He was also Solberg's campaign manager during the 2004 and 2006 federal election campaigns.

Regarding greenhouse gas emissions, Payne said, "There's a ways to go yet in terms of the number of things that we need to do, but we are making some progress. That's an important aspect. Overall, we still need to work with the provinces, obviously because industries are generally under provincial regulation."

On September 21, 2012, Payne tweeted his support for Motion 312, the controversial motion which would force Canada to reevaluate when life begins, saying, "When does an individual become Human. I am supporting the Motion."

Payne chose not to seek re-election in 2015.
