= Monte Solberg =

Canadian politician

The Honourable Monte Solberg PC
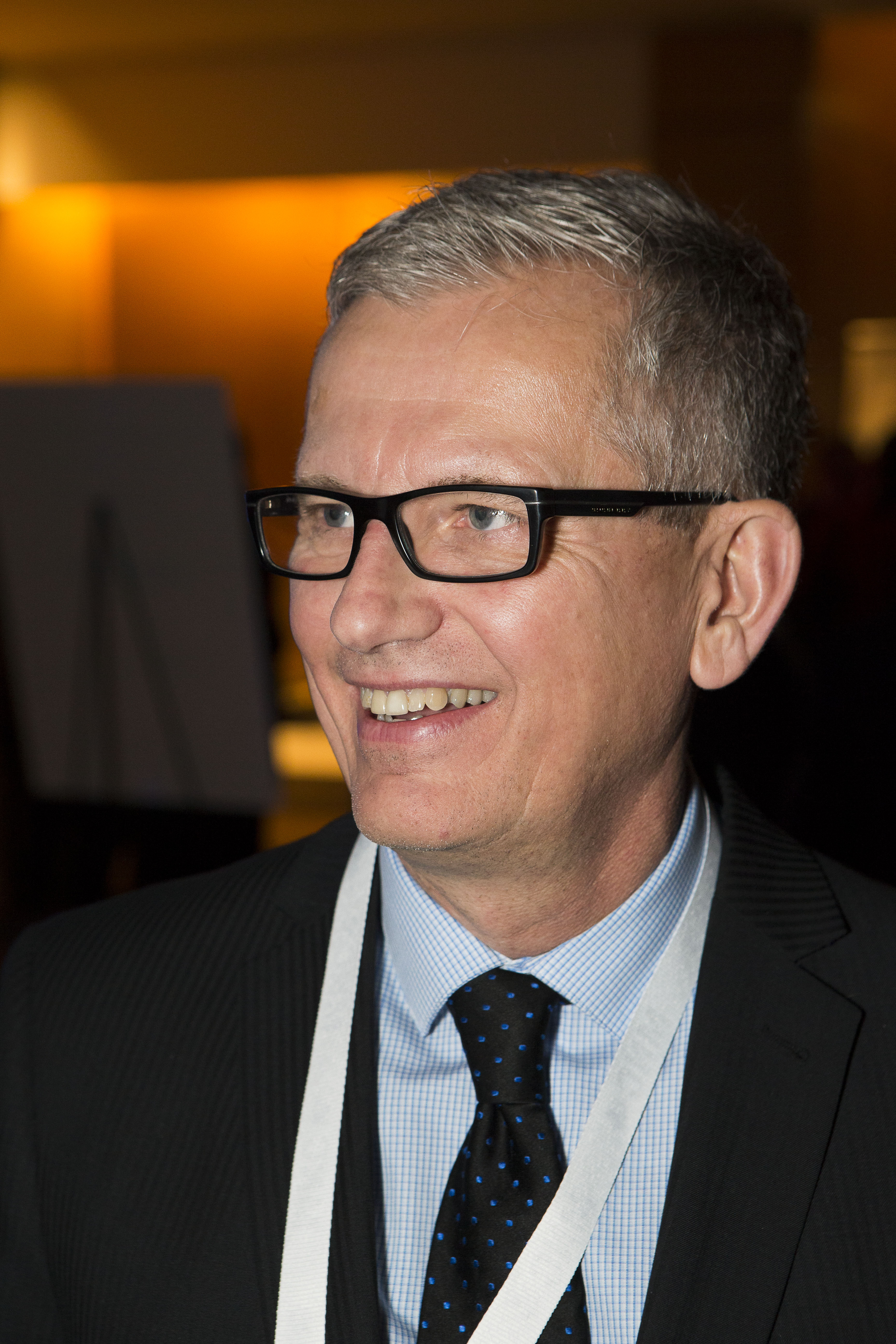

Member of Parliament for Medicine Hat
- In office October 25, 1993 – October 14, 2008
- Preceded by: Bob Porter
- Succeeded by: LaVar Payne

Personal details
- Born: Monte Kenton Solberg; September 17, 1958 (age 67) Calgary, Alberta, Canada
- Party: Conservative (2003–present)
- Other political affiliations: Reform (1993–2000); Canadian Alliance (2000–2003)
- Spouse: Deb Solberg
- Children: Matt Solberg, Michael Solberg
- Profession: Broadcaster, Businessman
- Portfolio: Minister of Human Resources and Social Development

Monte Kenton Solberg, PC (born September 17, 1958) is a Canadian businessman and politician. Solberg is a former Member of Parliament, representing the riding of Medicine Hat in the House of Commons of Canada as a member of the Conservative Party of Canada. He was the Minister of Citizenship and Immigration and later served as the Minister of Human Resources and Social Development. He has also served as Critic for Foreign Affairs, National Revenue, and Human Resources Development.

Solberg is now a Principal at New West Public Affairs, a Canadian national public affairs firm based in western Canada, and headquartered in Calgary, Alberta.

Solberg was the owner of the right-wing news aggregate website, News Hub Nation, from which he frequently blogged about current events and features exclusive content from conservative personalities.

== Early life ==
Solberg was born in Calgary, Alberta, the son of Shirley Jean (O'Neil) and Stanley James Solberg, a broadcasting pioneer. A former broadcaster and businessman, Solberg is of Norwegian ancestry.

== Political career ==
He was elected as a Reform Party Member of Parliament (MP) in 1993 and 1997, and as a Canadian Alliance MP in 2000. In 2001, Solberg was one of 13 MPs who were suspended from the Canadian Alliance caucus for criticizing the leadership of Stockwell Day. He sat as an Independent Alliance MP for the summer, joining the Democratic Representative Caucus in September before returning to the Alliance in April 2002. He was also one of four Alliance MPs who agreed to sit with the Progressive Conservative caucus (to preserve their official party status) after the December 9, 2003, creation of the merged Conservative Party, as the Progressive Conservative and Canadian Alliance parliamentary caucuses were not officially merged until a few weeks later. He was re-elected as a Conservative MP in the 2004 election.

Solberg kept a high-profile blog, and in 2005, is thought to have made history when, using his BlackBerry, he blogged from the floor of the House of Commons immediately upon the passage of Bill C-38, which provided legal recognition of same-sex marriage. Solberg was opposed to the bill. In 2006, Solberg again won his Medicine Hat riding, with 79.7% of the vote, the second highest winning percentage in the country for the 2006 federal election. He suspended updating his blog after being appointed Minister of Citizenship and Immigration.

In the January 4, 2007, cabinet shuffle, Solberg was appointed the new minister of Human Resources and Social Development, replacing Diane Finley.

== Retirement and present status ==
Thought by some to seek a leadership bid of the Conservative party, Solberg surprised many when he announced on September 4, 2008, that he was retiring from politics and would not be a candidate in the 40th Canadian federal election.

Solberg is a columnist with the Calgary Sun, a contributor to Sun News Network, formerly a full-time consultant for Fleishman-Hillard Canada, and now Principal at New West Public Affairs, a public affairs firm based in Calgary. He also serves as a Governor with the International Development Research Centre, a crown corporation dedicated to generating and applying new knowledge to meet the challenges facing the world's poorest countries.

28th Canadian Ministry (2006–2015) – Cabinet of Stephen Harper
Cabinet posts (2)
Predecessor	Office	Successor
Diane Finley	Minister of Human Resources and Skills Development; 2007–2008 styled as Minister of Human Resources and Social Development	Diane Finley
Joe Volpe	Minister of Citizenship and Immigration; 2006–2007	Diane Finley
