= Lutheran Women's Missionary League =

Official women's auxiliary of the Lutheran Church – Missouri Synod

Lutheran Women's Missionary League logo, adopted 1991

The Lutheran Women's Missionary League (LWML) is the official women's auxiliary of the Lutheran Church – Missouri Synod (LCMS).

The national organization publishes the Lutheran Woman's Quarterly four times a year, and districts usually have their own newsletters.

The LWML was established as an official auxiliary of the synod in a meeting at St. Stephan's Lutheran Church in Chicago, Illinois, on July 7–8, 1942. The formation of district and regional grouping of congregational women's societies starting in the 1920s had led the LCMS 1941 convention to urge the creation of the national group.

Since 1998, the LWML has also been known as Lutheran Women in Mission.

The LWML is divided into 40 districts in 4 convention regions (Western, Northern, Eastern, and Southern). The site of the national convention rotates among the regions.
