= Archibald Hugh Mitchell =

Canadian politician (1903–1986)

Member of Parliament for Medicine Hat
- In office 1935–1940
- Preceded by: Frederick William Gershaw
- Succeeded by: Frederick William Gershaw

Personal details
- Born: September 14, 1903 Macleod, Alberta
- Died: May 28, 1986 (aged 82)
- Party: Social Credit; New Democracy
- Occupation: farmer, politician, military officer

Archibald Hugh Mitchell (September 14, 1903 – May 28, 1986) was a farmer, officer in the Canadian Military and a Canadian federal politician. He was born in Macleod, Alberta. He served as a Member of the Canadian House of Commons from 1935 to 1940 sitting with the Social Credit caucus.

== Political career ==
Mitchell first ran for a seat to the House of Commons of Canada as a Social Credit candidate in the 1935 Canadian federal election in the Medicine Hat electoral district.

He would defeat incumbent Member of Parliament Frederick Gershaw to win his first term in office. Mitchell and Gershaw would run against each other again in the 1940 Canadian federal election this time with the result being reversed and Gershaw defeating Mitchell. He ran in that election under the New Democracy banner, and did not return to federal politics after his defeat.

== Army career ==
Mitchell served as a Major with the Royal Canadian Army Service Corps in the 1940s.
