= Archie Mitchell (disambiguation) =

Archie Mitchell is a character from EastEnders.

Archie Mitchell may also refer to:

- Archie Mitchell (footballer) (1885–1949), English football centre-half and manager
- Archie E. Mitchell (1918–?), minister with the Christian and Missionary Alliance
