= Medicine Hat—Cardston—Warner =

Federal electoral district in Alberta, Canada

Coordinates: 49.70°N 110.83°W

Alberta electoral district
- Interactive map of riding boundaries from the 2025 federal election. Point indicates the communities of Medicine Hat, Cardston, and Warner.

Federal electoral district
- Legislature: House of Commons
MP
Glen Motz
Conservative
- District created: 1907
- First contested: 1908
- Last contested: 2025
- District webpage: profile, map

Demographics
- Population (2011): 102,847
- Electors (2019): 78,384
- Area (km²): 29,982
- Pop. density (per km²): 3.4
- Census subdivision(s): Medicine Hat, Cypress, Redcliff, Cardston County (part), Warner County, Raymond, Cardston, Forty Mile, Magrath, Bow Island

Medicine Hat—Cardston—Warner (formerly Medicine Hat) is a federal electoral district in southern Alberta, Canada, that has been represented in the House of Commons of Canada since 1908.

Following the 2012 federal electoral redistribution, the riding was renamed Medicine Hat—Cardston—Warner.

In 2016, 34.9% of the population of the Medicine Hat constituency were of German ethnic origin, one of the highest percentages in all of Canada.

In the 42nd Canadian Parliament, the seat was represented by Jim Hillyer of the Conservative Party of Canada until his death on 23 March 2016. In the second by-election in the history of the Medicine Hat constituency held on 24 October 2016, Glen Motz of the Conservatives was elected. Motz has been the riding's representative to Ottawa since then.

== Geography ==
The constituency covers the City of Medicine Hat and surrounding areas in the southeast corner and southern U.S. border region of Alberta, including Cypress County, the County of Forty Mile No. 8, Warner No. 5 and the Town of Warner, and Cardston County and the Town of Cardston.

== Demographics ==
Panethnic groups in Medicine Hat—Cardston—Warner (2011−2021)
| Panethnic group | 2021 | | 2016 | | 2011 | |
| Panethnic group | Pop. | % | Pop. | % | Pop. | % |
|---|---|---|---|---|---|---|
| European (Note: Statistic includes all persons that did not make up part of a visible minority or an indigenous identity.) | 86,105 | 84.2% | 86,505 | 85.8% | 85,035 | 87.46% |
| Indigenous | 9,420 | 9.21% | 9,220 | 9.14% | 8,670 | 8.92% |
| Southeast Asian (Note: Statistic includes total responses of "Filipino" and "Southeast Asian" under visible minority section on census.) | 1,905 | 1.86% | 1,130 | 1.12% | 600 | 0.62% |
| South Asian | 1,375 | 1.34% | 710 | 0.7% | 470 | 0.48% |
| East Asian (Note: Statistic includes total responses of "Chinese", "Korean", and "Japanese" under visible minority section on census.) | 1,170 | 1.14% | 935 | 0.93% | 865 | 0.89% |
| African | 1,050 | 1.03% | 985 | 0.98% | 780 | 0.8% |
| Latin American | 610 | 0.6% | 740 | 0.73% | 490 | 0.5% |
| Middle Eastern (Note: Statistic includes total responses of "West Asian" and "Arab" under visible minority section on census.) | 340 | 0.33% | 255 | 0.25% | 135 | 0.14% |
| Other/multiracial (Note: Statistic includes total responses of "Visible minority, n.i.e." and "Multiple visible minorities" under visible minority section on census.) | 310 | 0.3% | 330 | 0.33% | 175 | 0.18% |
| Total responses | 102,265 | 94.35% | 100,825 | 94.32% | 97,225 | 94.53% |
| Total population | 108,391 | 100% | 106,896 | 100% | 102,847 | 100% |
Notes: Totals greater than 100% due to multiple origin responses. Demographics based on 2012 Canadian federal electoral redistribution riding boundaries.

According to the 2011 Canadian census

Languages: 86.4% English, 7.4% German, 1.2% French, ~1.1% Blackfoot (Blackfoot/Kainai counted as "Other language" on the Census; this number derived from "other language" speakers on Blackfoot/Kainai First Nations)
Religions: 72.0% Christian (21.4% Catholic, 9.6% United Church, 6.1% Lutheran, 3.6% Anglican, 2.2% Pentecostal, 1.5% Baptist, 27.6% Other Christian), 1.2% Traditional Indigenous Spirituality, 25.6% None.
Median income: $29,534 (2010) Average income: $39,940 (2010)

== History ==
Soon after the province of Alberta was established in 1905, this electoral district was created in 1907. It conformed to parts of the new provincial boundaries – combining the old Alberta riding (covering a southern portion of the old Alberta provisional district) with part of the old Assiniboia West riding.

During the 2012 electoral redistribution, "Medicine Hat" was largely succeeded by "Medicine Hat—Cardston—Warner", losing territory to Bow River and Battle River—Crowfoot, and gaining territory from Lethbridge and Macleod.

=== Members of Parliament ===
| Parliament | Years | Member | Party |
|---|---|---|---|
Medicine Hat; Riding created from Alberta provisional district and Assiniboia West
| 11th | 1908–1911 | Charles Alexander Magrath | Conservative |
| 12th | 1911–1917 | William Ashbury Buchanan | Liberal |
| 13th | 1917–1921 | Arthur Sifton | Government (Unionist) |
| 14th | 1921–1925 | Robert Gardiner | Progressive |
| 15th | 1925–1926 | Frederick William Gershaw | Liberal |
| 16th | 1926–1930 | Frederick William Gershaw | Liberal |
| 17th | 1930–1935 | Frederick William Gershaw | Liberal |
| 18th | 1935–1940 | Archibald Hugh Mitchell | Social Credit |
| 19th | 1940–1945 | Frederick William Gershaw | Liberal |
| 20th | 1945–1949 | William Duncan Wylie | Social Credit |
| 21st | 1949–1953 | William Duncan Wylie | Social Credit |
| 22nd | 1953–1957 | William Duncan Wylie | Social Credit |
| 23rd | 1957–1958 | Bud Olson | Social Credit |
| 24th | 1958–1962 | Edwin Brunsden | Progressive Conservative |
| 25th | 1962–1963 | Bud Olson | Social Credit |
| 26th | 1963–1965 | Bud Olson | Social Credit |
| 27th | 1965–1967 | Bud Olson | Social Credit |
| 27th | 1967–1968 | Bud Olson | Liberal |
| 28th | 1968–1972 | Bud Olson | Liberal |
| 29th | 1972–1974 | Bert Hargrave | Progressive Conservative |
| 30th | 1974–1979 | Bert Hargrave | Progressive Conservative |
| 31st | 1979–1980 | Bert Hargrave | Progressive Conservative |
| 32nd | 1980–1984 | Bert Hargrave | Progressive Conservative |
| 33rd | 1984–1988 | Bob Porter | Progressive Conservative |
| 34th | 1988–1993 | Bob Porter | Progressive Conservative |
| 35th | 1993–1997 | Monte Solberg | Reform |
| 36th | 1997–2000 | Monte Solberg | Reform |
| 36th | 2000–2000 | Monte Solberg | Alliance |
| 37th | 2000–2003 | Monte Solberg | Alliance |
| 37th | 2003–2004 | Monte Solberg | Conservative |
| 38th | 2004–2006 | Monte Solberg | Conservative |
| 39th | 2006–2008 | Monte Solberg | Conservative |
| 40th | 2008–2011 | LaVar Payne | Conservative |
| 41st | 2011–2015 | LaVar Payne | Conservative |
Medicine Hat—Cardston—Warner
| 42nd | 2015–2016 | Jim Hillyer | Conservative |
| 42nd | 2016–2019 | Glen Motz | Conservative |
| 43rd | 2019–2021 | Glen Motz | Conservative |
| 44th | 2021–2025 | Glen Motz | Conservative |
| 45th | 2025–present | Glen Motz | Conservative |

== Election results ==
Graph of election results in Medicine Hat, Medicine Hat—Cardston—Warner (Since 1907, minor parties that never got 2% of the vote or didn't run consistently are omitted) View source data.

=== Medicine Hat—Cardston—Warner, 2013–present ===
Graph of election results in Medicine Hat—Cardston—Warner (Since 2013, minor parties that never got 2% of the vote or didn't run consistently are omitted) View source data.

2025 Canadian federal election
| Party | Candidate | Votes | % | ±% | Expenditures |
|---|---|---|---|---|---|
| Conservative | Glen Motz | 41,518 | 76.74 | +10.94 | $53,474.95 |
| Liberal | Tom Rooke | 9,554 | 17.66 | +10.59 | $22,439.48 |
| New Democratic | Jocelyn Johnson | 2,588 | 4.78 | –9.11 | $1,844.62 |
| Green | Andy Shadrack | 440 | 0.81 | –0.57 | none listed |
| Total valid votes/expense limit | | 54,100 | 99.38 | – | $142,313.66 |
| Total rejected ballots | | 339 | 0.62 | +0.06 | |
| Turnout | | 54,439 | 67.45 | +6.58 | |
| Eligible voters | | 80,711 | | | |
| Conservative hold | | Swing | | +10.25 | |
Source: Elections Canada

2021 federal election redistributed results
| Party | Vote | % |
|---|---|---|
| Conservative | 31,629 | 65.80 |
| New Democratic | 6,678 | 13.89 |
| People's | 4,478 | 9.32 |
| Liberal | 3,397 | 7.07 |
| Green | 663 | 1.38 |
| Others | 1,226 | 2.55 |

2021 Canadian federal election
| Party | Candidate | Votes | % | ±% | Expenditures |
|---|---|---|---|---|---|
| Conservative | Glen Motz | 31,648 | 65.37 | –13.81 | $40,092.38 |
| New Democratic | Jocelyn Stenger | 6,816 | 14.08 | +5.34 | none listed |
| People's | Brodie Heidinger | 4,484 | 9.26 | +6.72 | $4,416.09 |
| Liberal | Hannah Wilson | 3,515 | 7.26 | +0.62 | $4,098.06 |
| Maverick | Geoff Shoesmith | 1,226 | 2.53 | – | $15,720.70 |
| Green | Diandra Bruised Head | 725 | 1.50 | –0.77 | none listed |
| Total valid votes/expense limit | | 48,414 | 99.44 | – | $124,312.24 |
| Total rejected ballots | | 274 | 0.56 | +0.08 | |
| Turnout | | 48,688 | 60.87 | –6.16 | |
| Eligible voters | | 79,992 | | | |
| Conservative hold | | Swing | | –9.58 | |
Source: Elections Canada

2019 Canadian federal election
| Party | Candidate | Votes | % | ±% | Expenditures |
|---|---|---|---|---|---|
| Conservative | Glen Motz | 42,045 | 79.18 | +9.33 | $29,481.08 |
| New Democratic | Elizabeth Thomson | 4,639 | 8.74 | +7.71 | none listed |
| Liberal | Harris Kirshenbaum | 3,528 | 6.64 | –18.97 | $10,696.35 |
| People's | Andrew Nelson | 1,350 | 2.54 | – | $2,249.74 |
| Green | Shannon Hawthorne | 1,203 | 2.27 | – | none listed |
| Independent | Dave Phillips | 337 | 0.64 | – | none listed |
| Total valid votes/expense limit | | 53,102 | 99.52 | – | $120,344.70 |
| Total rejected ballots | | 254 | 0.48 | +0.30 | |
| Turnout | | 53,356 | 67.03 | +22.81 | |
| Eligible voters | | 79,596 | | | |
| Conservative hold | | Swing | | +14.15 | |
Source: Elections Canada

Canadian federal by-election, October 24, 2016 Death of Jim Hillyer
| Party | Candidate | Votes | % | ±% | Expenditures |
|---|---|---|---|---|---|
| Conservative | Glen Motz | 23,932 | 69.85 | +1.05 | $66,149.98 |
| Liberal | Stan Sakamoto | 8,777 | 25.62 | +7.68 | $105,540.44 |
| Christian Heritage | Rod Taylor | 703 | 2.05 | – | $14,100.00 |
| New Democratic | Beverly Ann Waege | 353 | 1.03 | –8.64 | $147.55 |
| Libertarian | Sheldon W. Johnston | 285 | 0.83 | – | $1,596.90 |
| Rhinoceros | Kayne Cooper | 211 | 0.62 | – | none listed |
| Total valid votes/expense limit | | 34,261 | 99.82 | – | $112,531.55 |
| Total rejected ballots | | 61 | 0.18 | –0.05 | |
| Turnout | | 34,322 | 44.22 | –20.96 | |
| Eligible voters | | 77,608 | | | |
| Conservative hold | | Swing | | +4.36 | |
Source: Elections Canada

2015 Canadian federal election
| Party | Candidate | Votes | % | ±% | Expenditures |
|---|---|---|---|---|---|
| Conservative | Jim Hillyer | 34,849 | 68.80 | +0.10 | $54,953.54 |
| Liberal | Glen Allan | 9,085 | 17.94 | +6.78 | $12,090.72 |
| New Democratic | Erin Weir | 4,897 | 9.67 | –5.27 | $9,291.81 |
| Green | Brent Smith | 1,319 | 2.60 | –1.84 | $741.29 |
| Independent | John Clayton Turner | 500 | 0.99 | – | $4,050.58 |
| Total valid votes/expense limit | | 50,650 | 99.77 | – | $237,057.33 |
| Total rejected ballots | | 118 | 0.23 | – | |
| Turnout | | 50,768 | 65.18 | – | |
| Eligible voters | | 77,892 | | | |
| Conservative hold | | Swing | | –3.34 | |
Source: Elections Canada

2011 federal election redistributed results
| Party | Vote | % |
|---|---|---|
| Conservative | 25,659 | 68.70 |
| New Democratic | 5,578 | 14.94 |
| Liberal | 4,165 | 11.15 |
| Green | 1,658 | 4.44 |
| Others | 287 | 0.77 |

=== Medicine Hat, 1907–2013 ===
Graph of election results in Medicine Hat (1907-2013, minor parties that never got 2% of the vote or didn't run consistently are omitted) View source data.

2011 Canadian federal election: Medicine Hat
| Party | Candidate | Votes | % | ±% | Expenditures |
|---|---|---|---|---|---|
| Conservative | LaVar Payne | 30,719 | 71.55 | +0.68 | $46,870.00 |
| New Democratic | Dennis Perrier | 5,616 | 13.08 | +2.07 | $8,680.12 |
| Liberal | Norm Boucher | 4,416 | 10.29 | +3.35 | $24,284.79 |
| Green | Graham Murray | 1,868 | 4.35 | –1.80 | $3,179.54 |
| Christian Heritage | Frans Vandestroet | 317 | 0.74 | –0.22 | none listed |
| Total valid votes/expense limit | | 42,936 | 99.72 | – | $102,098.25 |
| Total rejected ballots | | 119 | 0.28 | +0.03 | |
| Turnout | | 43,055 | 52.13 | +5.93 | |
| Eligible voters | | 82,599 | | | |
| Conservative hold | | Swing | | –0.70 | |
Source: Elections Canada

2008 Canadian federal election: Medicine Hat
| Party | Candidate | Votes | % | ±% | Expenditures |
|---|---|---|---|---|---|
| Conservative | LaVar Payne | 26,950 | 70.87 | –8.84 | $64,544.75 |
| New Democratic | Wally Regehr | 4,187 | 11.01 | +2.97 | $3,110.30 |
| Liberal | Beverley Botter | 2,639 | 6.94 | –1.41 | $9,754.62 |
| Green | Kevin Dodd | 2,338 | 6.15 | +2.25 | $496.65 |
| Independent | Dean Shock | 971 | 2.55 | – | none listed |
| Independent | David S. Patrick | 580 | 1.53 | – | none listed |
| Christian Heritage | Frans Vandestroet | 363 | 0.96 | – | none listed |
| Total valid votes/expense limit | | 38,028 | 99.75 | – | $99,562.29 |
| Total rejected ballots | | 97 | 0.25 | +0.04 | |
| Turnout | | 38,125 | 46.20 | –10.12 | |
| Eligible voters | | 82,528 | | | |
| Conservative hold | | Swing | | –5.90 | |
Source: Elections Canada

2006 Canadian federal election: Medicine Hat
| Party | Candidate | Votes | % | ±% | Expenditures |
|---|---|---|---|---|---|
| Conservative | Monte Solberg | 35,670 | 79.71 | +3.56 | $39,321.38 |
| Liberal | Beverley Botter | 3,737 | 8.35 | –2.56 | $10,367.37 |
| New Democratic | Wally Regehr | 3,598 | 8.04 | –1.13 | $839.39 |
| Green | Kevin Dodd | 1,746 | 3.90 | +0.13 | $26.17 |
| Total valid votes/expense limit | | 44,751 | 99.79 | – | $91,765.54 |
| Total rejected ballots | | 96 | 0.21 | –0.04 | |
| Turnout | | 44,847 | 56.32 | +2.44 | |
| Eligible voters | | 79,634 | | | |
| Conservative hold | | Swing | | +3.06 | |
Source: Elections Canada

2004 Canadian federal election: Medicine Hat
| Party | Candidate | Votes | % | ±% | Expenditures |
|---|---|---|---|---|---|
| Conservative | Monte Solberg | 30,241 | 76.15 | –8.36 | $35,251.26 |
| Liberal | Bill Cocks | 4,331 | 10.91 | +0.57 | $12,921.53 |
| New Democratic | Betty Stroh | 3,643 | 9.17 | +4.03 | $10,683.23 |
| Green | Kevin Dodd | 1,498 | 3.77 | – | $891.02 |
| Total valid votes/expense limit | | 39,713 | 99.75 | – | $86,100.97 |
| Total rejected ballots | | 98 | 0.25 | –0.01 | |
| Turnout | | 39,811 | 53.88 | –4.83 | |
| Eligible voters | | 73,884 | | | |
| Conservative notional hold | | Swing | | –4.47 | |
Source: Elections Canada

2000 federal election redistributed results
| Party | Vote | % |
|---|---|---|
| Canadian Alliance | 30,749 | 74.39 |
| Liberal | 4,273 | 10.34 |
| Progressive Conservative | 4,186 | 10.13 |
| New Democratic | 2,128 | 5.15 |
| Independent | 1 | 0.00 |

2000 Canadian federal election: Medicine Hat
| Party | Candidate | Votes | % | ±% | Expenditures |
|---|---|---|---|---|---|
| Alliance | Monte Solberg | 31,134 | 74.28 | +8.83 | $37,263 |
| Liberal | Trevor Butts | 4,392 | 10.48 | –7.00 | $3,972 |
| Progressive Conservative | Gordon Musgrove | 4,236 | 10.11 | –2.03 | $2,521 |
| New Democratic | Luke Lacasse | 2,153 | 5.14 | +0.19 | $5,220 |
| Total valid votes | | 41,915 | 99.74 | | |
| Total rejected ballots | | 111 | 0.26 | +0.04 | |
| Turnout | | 42,026 | 58.71 | +5.15 | |
| Eligible voters | | 71,588 | | | |
| Alliance hold | | Swing | | +7.92 | |
Source: Elections Canada

1997 Canadian federal election: Medicine Hat
| Party | Candidate | Votes | % | ±% | Expenditures |
|---|---|---|---|---|---|
| Reform | Monte Solberg | 22,761 | 65.45 | +10.65 | $32,848 |
| Liberal | Glenn Ennis | 6,079 | 17.48 | –3.45 | $28,313 |
| Progressive Conservative | Gordon Musgrove | 4,219 | 12.13 | –4.66 | $7,651 |
| New Democratic | Jim Driscoll | 1,719 | 4.94 | +0.52 | $4,923 |
| Total valid votes | | 34,778 | 99.78 | | |
| Total rejected ballots | | 76 | 0.22 | –0.09 | |
| Turnout | | 34,854 | 53.56 | –10.39 | |
| Eligible voters | | 65,069 | | | |
| Reform hold | | Swing | | +7.05 | |
Source: Elections Canada

Note: Change based on redistributed results.

1993 federal election redistributed results
| Party | Vote | % |
|---|---|---|
| Reform | 22,014 | 54.79 |
| Liberal | 8,409 | 20.93 |
| Progressive Conservative | 6,746 | 16.79 |
| New Democratic | 1,776 | 4.42 |
| Others | 1,232 | 3.07 |

1993 Canadian federal election: Medicine Hat
| Party | Candidate | Votes | % | ±% |
|---|---|---|---|---|
| Reform | Monte Solberg | 22,439 | 54.72 | +43.96 |
| Liberal | Glenn Ennis | 8,555 | 20.86 | +8.80 |
| Progressive Conservative | William Wyse | 6,934 | 16.91 | –42.02 |
| New Democratic | Allan Hunt | 1,832 | 4.47 | –10.67 |
| Christian Heritage | Ivor Ottrey | 989 | 2.41 | –0.71 |
| Canada Party | Jack Hopkins | 262 | 0.64 | – |
| Total valid votes | | 41,011 | 99.69 | |
| Total rejected ballots | | 129 | 0.31 | +0.07 |
| Turnout | | 41,140 | 63.95 | –9.89 |
| Eligible voters | | 64,333 | | |
| Reform gain from Progressive Conservative | | Swing | | +42.99 |
Source: Elections Canada

1988 Canadian federal election: Medicine Hat
| Party | Candidate | Votes | % | ±% |
|---|---|---|---|---|
| Progressive Conservative | Robert Harold Porter | 25,114 | 58.92 | –16.83 |
| New Democratic | Jim Ridley | 6,453 | 15.14 | +4.77 |
| Liberal | Peter Hansen | 5,141 | 12.06 | +3.09 |
| Reform | Larry Samcoe | 4,582 | 10.75 | – |
| Christian Heritage | Hans Visser | 1,331 | 3.12 | – |
| Total valid votes | | 42,621 | 99.76 | |
| Total rejected ballots | | 104 | 0.24 | +0.02 |
| Turnout | | 42,725 | 73.84 | +3.76 |
| Eligible voters | | 57,865 | | |
| Progressive Conservative hold | | Swing | | –10.80 |
Source: Elections Canada

1984 Canadian federal election: Medicine Hat
| Party | Candidate | Votes | % | ±% |
|---|---|---|---|---|
| Progressive Conservative | Robert Harold Porter | 33,978 | 75.75 | +5.44 |
| New Democratic | Wally Regehr | 4,652 | 10.37 | +1.00 |
| Liberal | Peter Hansen | 4,025 | 8.97 | –8.56 |
| Confederation of Regions | Peter McArthur | 1,427 | 3.18 | – |
| Social Credit | Jack Hopkins | 772 | 1.72 | –1.05 |
| Total valid votes | | 44,854 | 99.78 | |
| Total rejected ballots | | 99 | 0.22 | –0.02 |
| Turnout | | 44,953 | 70.08 | +6.91 |
| Eligible voters | | 64,143 | | |
| Progressive Conservative hold | | Swing | | +7.00 |
Source: Elections Canada

1980 Canadian federal election: Medicine Hat
| Party | Candidate | Votes | % | ±% |
|---|---|---|---|---|
| Progressive Conservative | Bert Hargrave | 25,908 | 70.32 | –1.94 |
| Liberal | Ted Anhorn | 6,462 | 17.54 | +0.96 |
| New Democratic | Agnes Wiley | 3,453 | 9.37 | +1.74 |
| Social Credit | Jack Hopkins | 1,022 | 2.77 | –0.76 |
| Total valid votes | | 36,845 | 99.76 | |
| Total rejected ballots | | 87 | 0.24 | +0.05 |
| Turnout | | 36,932 | 63.17 | –6.95 |
| Eligible voters | | 58,467 | | |
| Progressive Conservative hold | | Swing | | –1.45 |
Source: Elections Canada

1979 Canadian federal election: Medicine Hat
| Party | Candidate | Votes | % | ±% |
|---|---|---|---|---|
| Progressive Conservative | Bert Hargrave | 28,893 | 72.25 | +17.39 |
| Liberal | Jim Wilfley | 6,630 | 16.58 | –16.19 |
| New Democratic | Lorne L. Burk | 3,053 | 7.64 | +0.71 |
| Social Credit | Jack Hopkins | 1,412 | 3.53 | –1.90 |
| Total valid votes | | 39,988 | 99.81 | |
| Total rejected ballots | | 78 | 0.19 | –0.14 |
| Turnout | | 40,066 | 70.12 | –1.49 |
| Eligible voters | | 57,142 | | |
| Progressive Conservative hold | | Swing | | +16.79 |
Source: Elections Canada

1974 Canadian federal election: Medicine Hat
| Party | Candidate | Votes | % | ±% |
|---|---|---|---|---|
| Progressive Conservative | Bert Hargrave | 15,525 | 54.86 | +1.16 |
| Liberal | Bud Olson | 9,273 | 32.77 | –0.83 |
| New Democratic | L. Hemmingway | 1,961 | 6.93 | –0.34 |
| Social Credit | Edwin Ed Ens | 1,538 | 5.44 | +0.01 |
| Total valid votes | | 28,297 | 99.67 | |
| Total rejected ballots | | 94 | 0.33 | –1.03 |
| Turnout | | 28,391 | 71.61 | –5.98 |
| Eligible voters | | 39,647 | | |
| Progressive Conservative hold | | Swing | | +1.00 |
Source: Library of Parliament

1972 Canadian federal election: Medicine Hat
| Party | Candidate | Votes | % | ±% |
|---|---|---|---|---|
| Progressive Conservative | Bert Hargrave | 15,027 | 53.70 | +17.69 |
| Liberal | Bud Olson | 9,403 | 33.60 | –3.25 |
| New Democratic | Lewis Edward Toole | 2,033 | 7.27 | –2.55 |
| Social Credit | D. Willard Paxman | 1,519 | 5.43 | –11.89 |
| Total valid votes | | 27,982 | 98.64 | |
| Total rejected ballots | | 387 | 1.36 | +0.84 |
| Turnout | | 28,369 | 77.59 | +1.53 |
| Eligible voters | | 36,563 | | |
| Progressive Conservative gain from Liberal | | Swing | | +10.47 |
Source: Library of Parliament

1968 Canadian federal election: Medicine Hat
| Party | Candidate | Votes | % | ±% |
|---|---|---|---|---|
| Liberal | Bud Olson | 9,015 | 36.85 | +21.64 |
| Progressive Conservative | Chuck Meagher | 8,809 | 36.01 | +8.41 |
| Social Credit | W.H. Walt Strom | 4,237 | 17.32 | –34.23 |
| New Democratic | Lewis Edward Toole | 2,401 | 9.82 | +4.18 |
| Total valid votes | | 24,462 | 99.48 | |
| Total rejected ballots | | 127 | 0.52 | +0.02 |
| Turnout | | 24,589 | 76.06 | –0.46 |
| Eligible voters | | 32,327 | | |
| Liberal notional hold | | Swing | | +27.94 |
Source: Library of Parliament

1965 Canadian federal election: Medicine Hat
| Party | Candidate | Votes | % | ±% |
|---|---|---|---|---|
| Social Credit | Bud Olson | 12,997 | 51.56 | +10.39 |
| Progressive Conservative | Chuck Meagher | 6,958 | 27.60 | –12.64 |
| Liberal | James C. Miller | 3,835 | 15.21 | +1.34 |
| New Democratic | Lewis Edward Toole | 1,420 | 5.63 | +0.91 |
| Total valid votes | | 25,210 | 99.50 | |
| Total rejected ballots | | 126 | 0.50 | +0.02 |
| Turnout | | 25,336 | 76.52 | –5.94 |
| Eligible voters | | 33,109 | | |
| Social Credit hold | | Swing | | +11.51 |
Source: Library of Parliament

1963 Canadian federal election: Medicine Hat
| Party | Candidate | Votes | % | ±% |
|---|---|---|---|---|
| Social Credit | Bud Olson | 11,080 | 41.17 | –0.23 |
| Progressive Conservative | Edwin William Brunsden | 10,829 | 40.24 | +3.19 |
| Liberal | David R. Broadfoot | 3,734 | 13.87 | –1.74 |
| New Democratic | John Head | 1,271 | 4.72 | –1.22 |
| Total valid votes | | 26,914 | 99.52 | |
| Total rejected ballots | | 129 | 0.48 | –0.22 |
| Turnout | | 27,043 | 82.46 | +3.39 |
| Eligible voters | | 32,796 | | |
| Social Credit hold | | Swing | | –1.71 |
Source: Library of Parliament

1962 Canadian federal election: Medicine Hat
| Party | Candidate | Votes | % | ±% |
|---|---|---|---|---|
| Social Credit | Bud Olson | 10,453 | 41.40 | +2.49 |
| Progressive Conservative | Edwin William Brunsden | 9,355 | 37.05 | –9.24 |
| Liberal | David R. Broadfoot | 3,942 | 15.61 | +4.68 |
| New Democratic | George McFall | 1,499 | 5.94 | +2.08 |
| Total valid votes | | 25,249 | 99.30 | |
| Total rejected ballots | | 178 | 0.70 | +0.08 |
| Turnout | | 25,427 | 79.07 | +0.59 |
| Eligible voters | | 32,159 | | |
| Social Credit gain from Progressive Conservative | | Swing | | +5.86 |
Source: Library of Parliament

1958 Canadian federal election: Medicine Hat
| Party | Candidate | Votes | % | ±% |
|---|---|---|---|---|
| Progressive Conservative | Edwin William Brunsden | 10,886 | 46.29 | +36.07 |
| Social Credit | Bud Olson | 9,151 | 38.91 | –7.95 |
| Liberal | B. Walter | 2,572 | 10.94 | –24.94 |
| Co-operative Commonwealth | J.D. Rogers | 907 | 3.86 | –1.54 |
| Total valid votes | | 23,516 | 99.38 | |
| Total rejected ballots | | 146 | 0.62 | –0.07 |
| Turnout | | 23,662 | 78.48 | –1.21 |
| Eligible voters | | 30,150 | | |
| Progressive Conservative gain from Social Credit | | Swing | | – |
Source: Library of Parliament

1957 Canadian federal election: Medicine Hat
| Party | Candidate | Votes | % | ±% |
|---|---|---|---|---|
| Social Credit | Bud Olson | 10,960 | 46.86 | –1.14 |
| Liberal | Harry Veiner | 8,390 | 35.87 | –10.14 |
| Progressive Conservative | Edwin William Brunsden | 2,391 | 10.22 | +4.23 |
| Co-operative Commonwealth | Earl Walter Smith | 1,262 | 5.40 | – |
| Independent Social Credit | William Raymond Klinck | 386 | 1.65 | – |
| Total valid votes | | 23,389 | 99.31 | |
| Total rejected ballots | | 162 | 0.69 | +0.15 |
| Turnout | | 23,551 | 79.69 | +10.96 |
| Eligible voters | | 29,552 | | |
| Social Credit hold | | Swing | | +5.64 |
Source: Library of Parliament

1953 Canadian federal election: Medicine Hat
| Party | Candidate | Votes | % | ±% |
|---|---|---|---|---|
| Social Credit | William Duncan Wylie | 9,305 | 48.00 | –6.52 |
| Liberal | Harry Veiner | 8,919 | 46.01 | +13.21 |
| Progressive Conservative | John Robertson | 1,161 | 5.99 | –6.69 |
| Total valid votes | | 19,385 | 99.46 | |
| Total rejected ballots | | 105 | 0.54 | –0.09 |
| Turnout | | 19,490 | 68.73 | –5.56 |
| Eligible voters | | 28,356 | | |
| Social Credit hold | | Swing | | –9.86 |
Source: Library of Parliament

1949 Canadian federal election: Medicine Hat
| Party | Candidate | Votes | % | ±% |
|---|---|---|---|---|
| Social Credit | William Duncan Wylie | 10,086 | 54.52 | +13.17 |
| Liberal | Harry Veiner | 6,069 | 32.80 | +4.45 |
| Progressive Conservative | Thomas Spencer Hughes | 2,346 | 12.68 | –3.53 |
| Total valid votes | | 18,501 | 99.37 | |
| Total rejected ballots | | 118 | 0.63 | –0.54 |
| Turnout | | 18,619 | 74.29 | –2.03 |
| Eligible voters | | 25,063 | | |
| Social Credit hold | | Swing | | +8.81 |
Source: Library of Parliament

1945 Canadian federal election: Medicine Hat
| Party | Candidate | Votes | % | ±% |
|---|---|---|---|---|
| Social Credit | William Duncan Wylie | 6,752 | 41.35 | +4.43 |
| Liberal | Robert Clark Black | 4,631 | 28.36 | –34.73 |
| Progressive Conservative | Philip Rogers | 2,647 | 16.21 | – |
| Co-operative Commonwealth | Earl Walter Smith | 2,301 | 14.09 | – |
| Total valid votes | | 16,331 | 98.83 | |
| Total rejected ballots | | 194 | 1.17 | +0.04 |
| Turnout | | 16,525 | 76.32 | +6.23 |
| Eligible voters | | 21,652 | | |
| Social Credit gain from Liberal | | Swing | | +19.58 |
Source: Library of Parliament

1940 Canadian federal election: Medicine Hat
| Party | Candidate | Votes | % | ±% |
|---|---|---|---|---|
| Liberal | Frederick William Gershaw | 9,439 | 63.08 | +30.43 |
| New Democracy | Archibald Hugh Mitchell | 5,524 | 36.92 | –15.21 |
| Total valid votes | | 14,963 | 98.87 | |
| Total rejected ballots | | 171 | 1.13 | +0.01 |
| Turnout | | 15,134 | 70.09 | –0.33 |
| Eligible voters | | 21,591 | | |
| Liberal gain from Social Credit | | Swing | | +22.82 |
Source: Library of Parliament

1935 Canadian federal election: Medicine Hat
| Party | Candidate | Votes | % | ±% |
|---|---|---|---|---|
| Social Credit | Archibald Hugh Mitchell | 6,752 | 52.13 | – |
| Liberal | Frederick William Gershaw | 4,229 | 32.65 | –33.38 |
| Conservative | Gilbert McNeill Blackstock | 1,971 | 15.22 | –18.75 |
| Total valid votes | | 12,952 | 98.88 | |
| Total rejected ballots | | 147 | 1.12 | +1.12 |
| Turnout | | 13,099 | 70.42 | +5.38 |
| Eligible voters | | 18,601 | | |
| Social Credit gain from Liberal | | Swing | | – |
Source: Library of Parliament

1930 Canadian federal election: Medicine Hat
| Party | Candidate | Votes | % | ±% |
|---|---|---|---|---|
| Liberal | Frederick William Gershaw | 6,043 | 66.03 | +16.62 |
| Conservative | Gilbert McNeill Blackstock | 3,109 | 33.97 | +7.82 |
| Total valid votes | | 9,152 | 100.00 | |
| Total rejected ballots | | – | | |
| Turnout | | 9,152 | 65.04 | –0.59 |
| Eligible voters | | 14,071 | | |
| Liberal hold | | Swing | | +12.22 |
Source: Library of Parliament

1926 Canadian federal election: Medicine Hat
| Party | Candidate | Votes | % | ±% |
|---|---|---|---|---|
| Liberal | Frederick William Gershaw | 4,206 | 49.41 | –0.29 |
| Conservative | Gilbert McNeill Blackstock | 2,226 | 26.15 | –1.03 |
| United Farmers of Alberta | Carl Henning Axelson | 2,081 | 24.45 | – |
| Total valid votes | | 8,513 | 100.00 | |
| Total rejected ballots | | – | | |
| Turnout | | 8,513 | 65.63 | –5.95 |
| Eligible voters | | 12,972 | | |
| Liberal hold | | Swing | | +0.66 |
Source: Library of Parliament

1925 Canadian federal election: Medicine Hat
| Party | Candidate | Votes | % | ±% |
|---|---|---|---|---|
| Liberal | Frederick William Gershaw | 4,383 | 49.70 | +30.60 |
| Conservative | Gilbert McNeill Blackstock | 2,397 | 27.18 | +19.15 |
| Progressive | Hugh Campbell McDaniel | 2,039 | 23.12 | –49.75 |
| Total valid votes | | 8,819 | 100.00 | |
| Total rejected ballots | | – | | |
| Turnout | | 8,819 | 71.58 | +5.71 |
| Eligible voters | | 12,321 | | |
| Liberal gain from Progressive | | Swing | | +24.87 |
Source: Library of Parliament

1921 Canadian federal election: Medicine Hat
| Party | Candidate | Votes | % | ±% |
|---|---|---|---|---|
| Progressive | Robert Gardiner | 10,295 | 72.87 | –6.72 |
| Liberal | Frederick William Gershaw | 2,698 | 19.10 | – |
| Conservative | William McIntosh | 1,135 | 8.03 | – |
| Total valid votes | | 14,128 | 100.00 | |
| Total rejected ballots | | unknown | | |
| Turnout | | 14,128 | 65.87 | – |
| Eligible voters | | 21,449 | | |
| Progressive hold | | Swing | | –12.91 |
Source: Library of Parliament

Canadian federal by-election, June 27, 1921: Medicine Hat Death of Arthur Sifton on January 21, 1921
| Party | Candidate | Votes | % | ±% |
|---|---|---|---|---|
| Progressive | Robert Gardiner | 13,133 | 79.58 | – |
| Unknown | Nelson Spencer | 3,369 | 20.42 | – |
| Total valid votes | | 16,502 | 100.00 | |
| Total rejected ballots | | – | | |
| Turnout | | 16,502 | – | – |
| Eligible voters | | | | |
| Progressive gain from Government (Unionist) | | Swing | | – |
Source: Library of Parliament

1917 Canadian federal election: Medicine Hat
| Party | Candidate | Votes | % | ±% |
|---|---|---|---|---|
| Government (Unionist) | Arthur Sifton | 6,869 | 63.04 | – |
| Opposition (Laurier Liberals) | Clifford Bernardo Reilly | 3,568 | 32.74 | – |
| Nonpartisan League | George Paton | 460 | 4.22 | – |
| Total valid votes | | 10,897 | 100.00 | |
| Total rejected ballots | | – | | |
| Turnout | | 10,897 | 80.15 | +18.78 |
| Eligible voters | | 13,596 | | |
| Government (Unionist) gain from Liberal | | Swing | | – |
Source: Library of Parliament

1911 Canadian federal election: Medicine Hat
| Party | Candidate | Votes | % | ±% |
|---|---|---|---|---|
| Liberal | William Ashbury Buchanan | 6,330 | 56.49 | +9.70 |
| Conservative | Charles Alexander Magrath | 4,875 | 43.51 | –9.70 |
| Total valid votes | | 11,205 | 100.00 | |
| Total rejected ballots | | – | | |
| Turnout | | 11,205 | 61.37 | – |
| Eligible voters | | 18,259 | | |
| Liberal gain from Conservative | | Swing | | +9.70 |
Source: Library of Parliament

1908 Canadian federal election: Medicine Hat
| Party | Candidate | Votes | % |
|---|---|---|---|
| Conservative | Charles Alexander Magrath | 2,922 | 53.21 |
| Liberal | William Simmons | 2,570 | 46.80 |
| Total valid votes | | 5,492 | 100.00 |
| Total rejected ballots | | – | |
| Turnout | | 5,492 | – |
| Eligible voters | | | |
Source: Library of Parliament

== Student vote ==
=== 2025 ===
2025 Canadian federal election
| Party | Candidate | Votes | % |
|---|---|---|---|
| Conservative | Glen Motz | 2,547 | 60.93 |
| Liberal | Tom Rooke | 762 | 18.23 |
| New Democratic | Jocelyn Johnson | 542 | 12.97 |
| Green | Andy Shadrack | 329 | 7.87 |
| Total votes | | 4,180 | |
Source: Student Vote Canada

=== 2021 ===
2021 Canadian federal election
| Party | Candidate | Votes | % |
|---|---|---|---|
| Conservative | Glen Motz | 2,625 | 51.17 |
| New Democratic | Jocelyn Stenger | 868 | 16.92 |
| Green | Diandra Bruised Head | 505 | 9.84 |
| Liberal | Hannah Wilson | 490 | 9.55 |
| People's | Brodie Heidinger | 442 | 8.62 |
| Maverick | Geoff Shoesmith | 200 | 3.90 |
| Total votes | | 5,130 | 100 |
Source: Student Vote Canada

=== 2019 ===
2019 Canadian federal election
| Party | Candidate | Votes | % |
|---|---|---|---|
| Conservative | Glen Motz | 3,005 | 54.27 |
| New Democratic | Elizabeth Thomson | 817 | 14.76 |
| Independent | Dave Philips | 550 | 9.93 |
| Green | Shannon Hawthrone | 447 | 8.07 |
| Liberal | Harris Krishenbaum | 400 | 7.22 |
| People's | Andrew Nelson | 318 | 5.74 |
| Total votes | | 5,537 | 100 |
Source: Student Vote Canada

== See also ==
- List of Canadian electoral districts
- Historical federal electoral districts of Canada
