= Bert Hargrave =

Canadian politician

Herbert Thomas Hargrave

Member of Parliament for Medicine Hat
- In office 1972–1984
- Preceded by: Bud Olson
- Succeeded by: Robert Harold Porter

Personal details
- Born: March 30, 1917 Medicine Hat, Alberta, Canada
- Died: September 24, 1996 (aged 79) Medicine Hat, Alberta, Canada
- Party: Progressive Conservative
- Spouse: Amy Reinhardt
- Profession: Rancher

Herbert Thomas Hargrave MBE (March 30, 1917 – September 24, 1996) was a Progressive Conservative party member of the House of Commons of Canada. He represented the riding of Medicine Hat from 1972 to 1984.

== Early life ==
Hargrave was born in Medicine Hat on March 30, 1917, the sixth child of Thomas Albert Hargrave and Mary Hope Whimster. He received a Bachelor of Science in agricultural engineering from the University of Saskatchewan in 1942. During the World War II, he was a captain with the Corps of Royal Canadian Electrical and Mechanical Engineers.

== Political career ==
Hargrave represented Alberta's Medicine Hat electoral district where he first won national office in the 1972 federal election. He was re-elected there in the 1974, 1979 and 1980 federal elections. He retired from federal politics after this after serving in the 29th, 30th, 31st and 32nd Canadian Parliaments. He did not seek re-election in 1984.

== Later life ==
Following several years of declining health, he died at Central Park Lodge in Medicine Hat on September 24, 1996. He was 79.

== Awards and recognition ==
In 1944, Hargrave was named a Member of the British Empire.

In 1986, he was inducted into the Alberta Order of Excellence.

In 1993, he was appointed to the Alberta Agriculture Hall of Fame.
