= Bud Olson =

Canadian politician (1925–2002)

The Honourable Bud Olson PC AOE
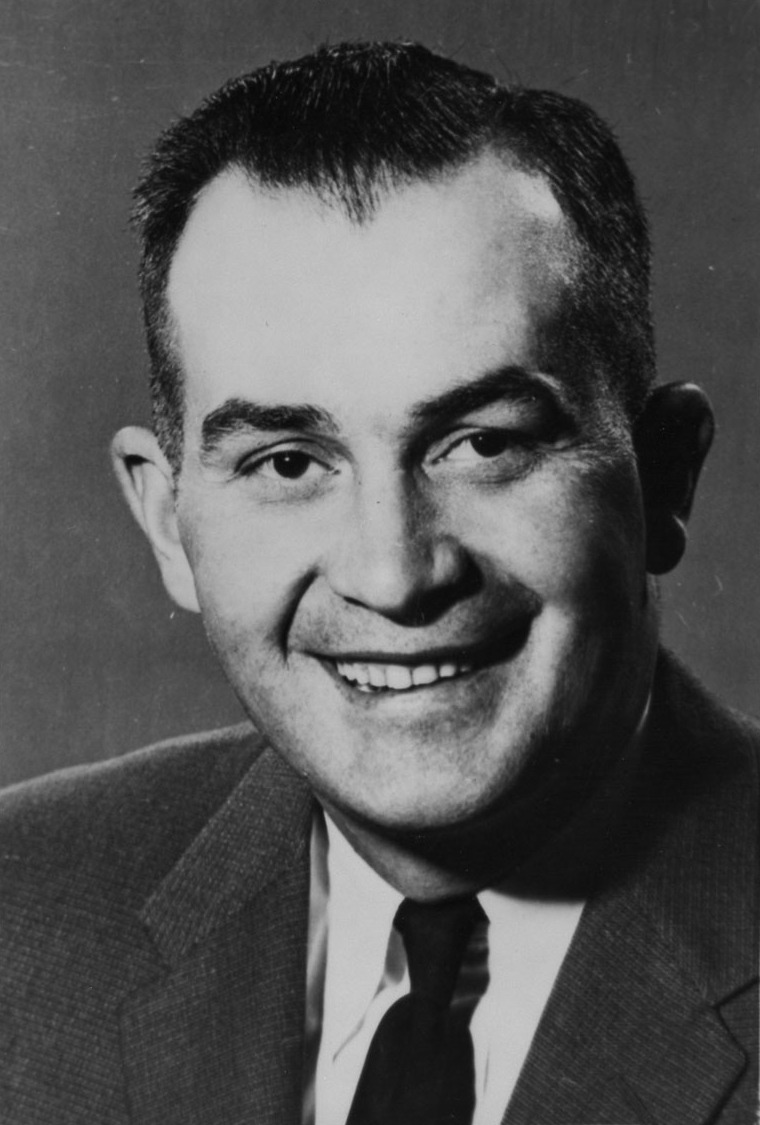
- Olson c. 1950s

14th Lieutenant Governor of Alberta
- In office April 17, 1996 – February 10, 2000
- Monarch: Elizabeth II
- Governors General: Roméo LeBlanc; Adrienne Clarkson
- Premier: Ralph Klein
- Preceded by: Gordon Towers
- Succeeded by: Lois Hole

Member of Parliament for Medicine Hat
- In office June 10, 1957 – March 31, 1958
- Preceded by: William Duncan Wylie
- Succeeded by: Edwin William Brunsden
- In office June 18, 1962 – October 30, 1972
- Preceded by: Edwin William Brunsden
- Succeeded by: Bert Hargrave

Minister of Agriculture
- In office 6 July 1968 – 26 November 1972
- Prime Minister: Pierre Trudeau
- Preceded by: Joe Greene
- Succeeded by: Eugene Whelan

Canadian Senator from Alberta
- In office April 5, 1977 – March 7, 1996
- Appointed by: Pierre Trudeau

Personal details
- Born: Horace Andrew Olson; October 6, 1925 Iddesleigh, Alberta, Canada
- Died: February 14, 2002 (aged 76) Medicine Hat, Alberta, Canada
- Party: Liberal (from 1967); Social Credit (until 1967)
- Spouse: Marion Lucille McLachlan (m. 1947)
- Children: 4
- Occupation: farmer, rancher and businessman

Horace Andrew "Bud" Olson PC AOE (October 6, 1925 – February 14, 2002) was a Canadian businessman and politician from Alberta. He served as the 14th Lieutenant Governor of Alberta from 1996 to 2000. He also served as a Member of Parliament, Senator, Minister of Agriculture, and Minister of Economic and Regional Development. He was also a farmer and rancher, and president and operating officer of Farmer's Stockmen's Supplies in Medicine Hat and Lethbridge, Alberta.

== Early life ==
Born in Iddesleigh, Alberta on October 6, 1925. On January 27, 1947, he married Marion Lucille McLachlan. They had four children: Sharon Lee, Andrea Lucille, Juanita Carol and Horace Andrew Jr.

== Federal politics ==
Bud Olson was first elected to the House of Commons of Canada in the 1957 election as a Social Credit Member of Parliament (MP) from Medicine Hat. He was defeated in the Diefenbaker Progressive Conservatives' sweep of 1958, but re-elected in 1962, 1963, and 1965.

With the Social Credit Party's English Canadian wing rapidly disintegrating, Olson crossed the floor in 1967 to join the Liberal Party. Olson supported Pierre Trudeau's successful candidacy for the Liberal leadership in 1968, narrowly won re-election as an MP in 1968 and became minister of agriculture in the first Trudeau government. Olson served in that position until he was heavily defeated by PC challenger Bert Hargrave in the 1972 general election. He was one of only four Liberal MPs elected from Alberta in 1968; all were defeated in 1972. To date, Olson is the last Liberal elected from a rural Alberta riding.

Olson sought a rematch against Hargrave in 1974, but lost by a margin almost as large as he had in 1972. In 1977, Trudeau appointed him to the Senate of Canada. Olson served as leader of the opposition in the Senate in 1979, and returned to Cabinet when the Trudeau Liberals returned to power in 1980.

He served as Minister of Economic and Regional Development from 1980 to 1984, as well as Leader of the Government in the Senate. As one of Trudeau's most powerful ministers, he chaired the cabinet committee on economic development from 1980 to 1983. He was also the minister responsible for the Northern Pipeline Agency from 1980 to 1984, and the government leader in the Senate from 1982 to 1984. It was also Olson's job to promote the government's unpopular National Energy Program in Alberta.

== Late life ==
Olson resigned from the Senate when he was appointed Alberta's 14th Lieutenant-Governor in April 1996. He served in that position until 2000.

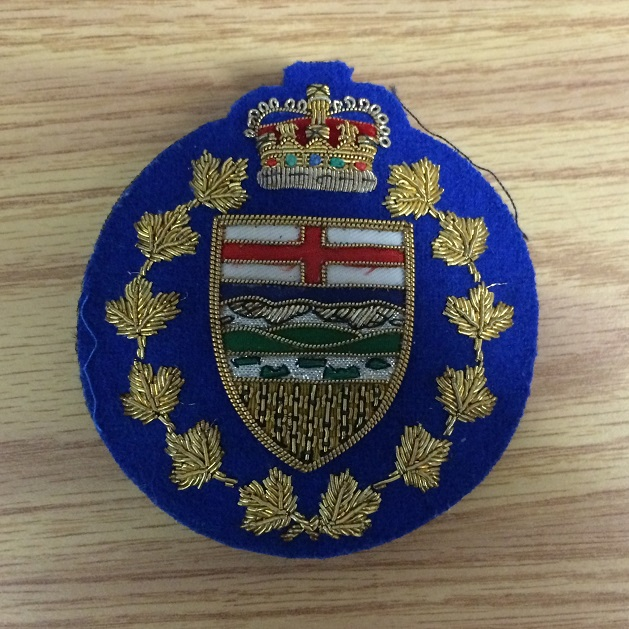
Lieutenant Governor of Alberta Shield - worn on the front of CAPS constables blazers when providing security for LG

Bud Olson died in Medicine Hat in 2002.

== Arms ==
Coat of arms of Bud Olson

Adopted
January 26, 1998
Crest
A demi lion per fess Gules and Azure wearing a coronet Argent the upper rim set with wild rose flowers proper holding in the dexter paw a rattlesnake Or
Escutcheon
Per fess Azure and Or in chief the maces of the Senate and House of Commons of Canada in saltire ensigned by a coronet érablé Or in base four cattle heads affronty one two and one Gules
Supporters
2 pronghorn antelopes Or and Argent branded on the flank " — Z — " Gules charged on the breast with a cross Moline Azure
Compartment
A mound of Prairie grassland proper
Motto
TO STRIVE TO SERVE
Orders
The ribbon and insignia of a Companion of the Order of Canada.
DESIDERANTES MELIOREM PATRIAM (They desire a better country)

22nd Canadian Ministry (1980–1984) – Second cabinet of Pierre Trudeau
Cabinet post (1)
Predecessor	Office	Successor
Ray Perrault	Leader of the Government in the Senate; 1982–1984	Allan MacEachen
