= Jim Hillyer (politician) =

Canadian politician

Member of Parliament for Medicine Hat—Cardston—Warner
- In office 19 October 2015 – 23 March 2016
- Preceded by: LaVar Payne
- Succeeded by: Glen Motz

Member of Parliament for Lethbridge
- In office 2 May 2011 – 19 October 2015
- Preceded by: Rick Casson
- Succeeded by: Rachael Harder

Personal details
- Born: James Nation Hillyer; 8 July 1974 Lethbridge, Alberta, Canada
- Died: 23 March 2016 (aged 41) Ottawa, Ontario, Canada
- Party: Conservative
- Spouse: Livi Hillyer
- Children: 4
- Education: University of Lethbridge; George Wythe University

James Nation Hillyer (8 July 1974 – 23 March 2016) was a federal Canadian politician who served as a Member of Parliament for the electoral district of Lethbridge and later Medicine Hat–Cardston–Warner. Hillyer was first elected to the House of Commons for the federal Conservative Party of Canada in the 2011 election and then re-elected in 2015. He served in this role until his death in March 2016.

== Early life and education ==
Hillyer was born in Lethbridge, Alberta, and was raised in nearby Stirling, Alberta. Hillyer grew up playing soccer and hockey, he earned his Chief Scout Award, and was also valedictorian when he graduated from Stirling High School in 1992. Hillyer married Livi, his high school sweetheart, in the Cardston Alberta Temple in 1995, after serving two years as a missionary for the Church of Jesus Christ of Latter-day Saints (LDS Church) in Quebec.

Hillyer earned a BA in Philosophy from the University of Lethbridge, where he was in the University of Lethbridge Singers. Hillyer was also a violinist in the Lethbridge Symphony. Upon graduating he pursued his master's degree at the University of Regina after moving there to work for the DeVry Institute of Technology. While in Regina, Hillyer won a nomination to run in the Saskatchewan provincial election under the Saskatchewan Party banner.

Hillyer received his master's degree in political economy from George Wythe University in Cedar City, Utah. In 2006, he published a book, Coyotes and Indians, and an accompanying documentary of the same title, examining the past 100-year history of the Blood Indian Reserve in Alberta as his thesis. He was a PhD candidate, pursuing advanced studies in constitutional law when his health once again became an issue.

He was an entrepreneur and business consultant.

== Political career ==
Hillyer decided to make his political comeback and ran successfully for the Conservative Party of Canada in the 2011 federal election. In spite of controversy, Hillyer followed the campaign strategy from Conservative Party headquarters which stipulated new candidates should not attend community forums. This was a divisive topic in the riding and a local newspaper would go on to dub Hillyer as "The Man Who Wasn't There". However, Hillyer won his seat handily with nearly 69% of the vote.

During his first term, the electoral boundaries in southern Alberta were changed. Raymond, where Hillyer lived, was moved from the Lethbridge riding into the newly expanded Medicine Hat—Cardston—Warner riding. In 2014, upon learning that the current Member of Parliament for the area was stepping down, Hillyer sought the nomination in the new riding where he resided. Hillyer won the nomination by a nearly 4-to-1 margin over his opponent and was re-elected in the 2015 federal election.

While in office, Hillyer introduced a motion asking the House of Commons to amend the Canadian Charter of Rights and Freedoms to include property rights. Ultimately this motion could not continue after the supporting motion of the Wildrose Party was defeated by the Progressive Conservative Party in the Alberta Legislature. Hillyer had developed a reputation on the hill as a staunch social Conservative and was known for his vote record on these issues.

He supported former MP Stephen Woodworth's motion which called on Parliament to establish a committee to reexamine the definition of when human life begins.

Hillyer worked alongside former MP Joy Smith to advocate for adoption of the Nordic Model instead of legalizing prostitution and to create legislation to prevent human trafficking. Hillyer worked tirelessly to end what he called the "normalization of prostitution."

Hillyer was also an advocate for First Nations peoples across Canada and for his strong support the Blackfoot Canadian Cultural Society honored Hillyer with the name "Api Stamik", or White Buffalo BullCalf.

In December 2011, Hillyer stated in the House of Commons that he intended no offence when he made gunshot gestures with his hands as he voted to scrap the Canadian Firearms Registry. In promising not to make hand gestures in the Commons in the future, Hillyer suggested that "if people were offended they should blame whoever posted the six-week-old video [on YouTube] on the anniversary" of the École Polytechnique massacre.

In March 2012, Hillyer was caught on camera "rolling his eyes dramatically" in the House of Commons during a speech by NDP MP Pat Martin.

== Personal life ==
Hillyer and his wife, Livi, had four children.

=== Health and death ===
Hillyer was diagnosed with acute myeloid leukemia at age 28 and underwent treatment. In late 2008, he was diagnosed with tethered cord syndrome and tumors inside his spinal cord. After undergoing neurosurgery on his spinal cord to rectify this, he continued to pursue his political aspirations and career interests despite chronic complications from the surgery.

In 2013, Hillyer broke his leg in a ski accident, which had long-term health consequences; he had surgery for a bone infection in February 2016, shortly before his death. After recovering from surgery, he returned to Ottawa to vote in the 2016 Canadian Federal budget, on 22 March 2016.

Early the following morning, Hillyer was found dead in his Ottawa office at the age of 41. An autopsy confirmed cardiomyopathy, sudden heart failure that may have indirectly been attributed to the chemotherapy he underwent a decade before.

== Electoral record ==
2015 Canadian federal election: Medicine Hat—Cardston—Warner
Party	Candidate	Votes	%	±%	Expenditures
Conservative	Jim Hillyer	34,849	68.8	+0.10	–
Liberal	Glen Allan	9,085	17.9	+6.75	–
New Democratic	Erin Weir	4,897	9.7	-5.24	–
Green	Brent Smith	1,319	2.6	-1.84	–
Independent	John Clayton Turner	500	1.0	+0.23	–
Total valid votes/Expense limit		50,650	100.0		$236,204.82
Total rejected ballots		118	–	–	
Turnout		50,768	66.11	–	
Eligible voters		76,789			
Conservative hold		Swing		+2.67	
Source: Elections Canada

2011 Canadian federal election: Lethbridge
Party	Candidate	Votes	%	±%	Expenditures
Conservative	Jim Hillyer	27,173	56.51	-10.45	$72,625
New Democratic	Mark Sandilands	13,097	27.24	+13.02	$36,703
Liberal	Michael Cormican	4,030	8.38	-0.92	$23,067
Green	Cailin Bartlett	2,095	4.36	-2.86	$0
Christian Heritage	Geoffrey Capp	1,716	3.57	+1.26	$14,727
Total valid votes/Expense limit		48,086	100.00		
Total rejected ballots		307	0.63	+0.34	
Turnout		48,393	54.20	+1	
Eligible voters		89,280	–	–	
