= Glen Motz =

Canadian politician

Glen Motz MP
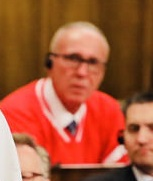

Member of Parliament for Medicine Hat—Cardston—Warner
- Incumbent
- Assumed office October 24, 2016
- Preceded by: Jim Hillyer

Personal details
- Born: 1958 (age 67–68); Hanna, Alberta, Canada
- Party: Conservative
- Education: Hillcrest Christian College

Glen Motz MP (born 1958) is a Canadian politician who has served in the House of Commons of Canada as Member of Parliament for Medicine Hat—Cardston—Warner since 2016. He is a member of the Conservative Party of Canada.

== Personal life ==
Prior to his election, Motz served for 35 years with the Medicine Hat Police Service and retired as Inspector in 2015.

== Political career ==
In 2017, Glen Motz was promoted to Deputy Shadow Minister for Public Safety and Emergency Preparedness. After the 2019 election, he was named the Associate Shadow Minister for Public Safety and Emergency Preparedness. Motz was re-elected again in 2021.

== Electoral record ==
2025 Canadian federal election: Medicine Hat—Cardston—Warner
Party	Candidate	Votes	%	±%	Expenditures
Conservative	Glen Motz	41,518	76.74	+10.94	$53,474.95
Liberal	Tom Rooke	9,554	17.66	+10.59	$22,439.48
New Democratic	Jocelyn Johnson	2,588	4.78	–9.11	$1,844.62
Green	Andy Shadrack	440	0.81	–0.57	none listed
Total valid votes/expense limit		54,100	99.38	–	$142,313.66
Total rejected ballots		339	0.62	+0.06	
Turnout		54,439	67.45	+6.58	
Eligible voters		80,711			
Conservative hold		Swing		+10.25	
Source: Elections Canada

2021 Canadian federal election: Medicine Hat—Cardston—Warner
Party	Candidate	Votes	%	±%	Expenditures
Conservative	Glen Motz	31,648	65.37	–13.81	$40,092.38
New Democratic	Jocelyn Stenger	6,816	14.08	+5.34	none listed
People's	Brodie Heidinger	4,484	9.26	+6.72	$4,416.09
Liberal	Hannah Wilson	3,515	7.26	+0.62	$4,098.06
Maverick	Geoff Shoesmith	1,226	2.53	–	$15,720.70
Green	Diandra Bruised Head	725	1.50	–0.77	none listed
Total valid votes/expense limit		48,414	99.44	–	$124,312.24
Total rejected ballots		274	0.56	+0.08	
Turnout		48,688	60.87	–6.16	
Eligible voters		79,992			
Conservative hold		Swing		–9.58	
Source: Elections Canada

2019 Canadian federal election: Medicine Hat—Cardston—Warner
Party	Candidate	Votes	%	±%	Expenditures
Conservative	Glen Motz	42,045	79.18	+9.33	$29,481.08
New Democratic	Elizabeth Thomson	4,639	8.74	+7.71	none listed
Liberal	Harris Kirshenbaum	3,528	6.64	–18.97	$10,696.35
People's	Andrew Nelson	1,350	2.54	–	$2,249.74
Green	Shannon Hawthorne	1,203	2.27	–	none listed
Independent	Dave Phillips	337	0.64	–	none listed
Total valid votes/expense limit		53,102	99.52	–	$120,344.70
Total rejected ballots		254	0.48	+0.30	
Turnout		53,356	67.03	+22.81	
Eligible voters		79,596			
Conservative hold		Swing		+14.15	
Source: Elections Canada

Canadian federal by-election, October 24, 2016: Medicine Hat—Cardston—Warner Due to the death of Jim Hillyer
Party	Candidate	Votes	%	±%
Conservative	Glen Motz	23,932	69.85	+1.05
Liberal	Stan Sakamoto	8,778	25.62	+7.68
Christian Heritage	Rod Taylor	702	2.05	
New Democratic	Beverly Ann Waege	353	1.03	-8.64
Libertarian	Sheldon Johnston	284	0.83	
Rhinoceros	Kayne Cooper	211	0.62	
Total valid votes/Expense limit		34,260	100.00	–
Total rejected ballots			-	
Turnout			44.54	
Eligible voters		76,911		
Conservative hold		Swing		-3.32
Sources: Elections Canada
