= List of House members of the 44th Parliament of Canada =

This is a list of members of the House of Commons of Canada in the 44th Canadian Parliament.

== Members ==
Key:

- Party leaders are italicized.
- Cabinet ministers are in **boldface**.
- The prime minister is **both**.
- The speaker is indicated by "†".
- Parliamentary secretaries is indicated by "‡".

=== Alberta ===
Name	Party	Electoral district	First elected / previously elected	No. of terms
Blake Richards	Conservative	Banff—Airdrie	2008	5th term
Damien Kurek	Conservative	Battle River—Crowfoot	2019	2nd term
Martin Shields	Conservative	Bow River	2015	3rd term
Greg McLean	Conservative	Calgary Centre	2019	2nd term
Len Webber	Conservative	Calgary Confederation	2015	3rd term
Jasraj Hallan	Conservative	Calgary Forest Lawn	2019	2nd term
Bob Benzen (until 31 December 2022)	Conservative	Calgary Heritage	2017	3rd term
Shuvaloy Majumdar (from 24 July 2023)	Conservative	Calgary Heritage	2023	1st term
Stephanie Kusie	Conservative	Calgary Midnapore	2017	3rd term
Michelle Rempel Garner	Conservative	Calgary Nose Hill	2011	4th term
Pat Kelly	Conservative	Calgary Rocky Ridge	2015	3rd term
Tom Kmiec	Conservative	Calgary Shepard	2015	3rd term
Ron Liepert	Conservative	Calgary Signal Hill	2015	3rd term
George Chahal	Liberal	Calgary Skyview	2021	1st term
**Randy Boissonnault**	Liberal	Edmonton Centre	2015, 2021	2nd term*
Blake Desjarlais	New Democratic	Edmonton Griesbach	2021	1st term
Ziad Aboultaif	Conservative	Edmonton Manning	2015	3rd term
Tim Uppal	Conservative	Edmonton Mill Woods	2008, (Note: Edmonton—Sherwood Park) 2019	4th term*
Matt Jeneroux	Conservative	Edmonton Riverbend	2015	3rd term
Heather McPherson	New Democratic	Edmonton Strathcona	2019	2nd term
Kelly McCauley	Conservative	Edmonton West	2015	3rd term
Mike Lake	Conservative	Edmonton—Wetaskiwin	2006	6th term
John Barlow	Conservative	Foothills	2014	4th term
Laila Goodridge	Conservative	Fort McMurray—Cold Lake	2021	1st term
Chris Warkentin	Conservative	Grande Prairie—Mackenzie	2006	6th term
Shannon Stubbs	Conservative	Lakeland	2015	3rd term
Rachael Thomas	Conservative	Lethbridge	2015	3rd term
Glen Motz	Conservative	Medicine Hat—Cardston—Warner	2016	3rd term
Arnold Viersen	Conservative	Peace River—Westlock	2015	3rd term
Blaine Calkins	Conservative	Red Deer—Lacombe	2006	6th term
Earl Dreeshen	Conservative	Red Deer—Mountain View	2008	5th term
Garnett Genuis	Conservative	Sherwood Park—Fort Saskatchewan	2015	3rd term
Michael Cooper	Conservative	St. Albert—Edmonton	2015	3rd term
Dane Lloyd	Conservative	Sturgeon River—Parkland	2017	3rd term
Gerald Soroka	Conservative	Yellowhead	2019	2nd term

=== British Columbia ===
Name	Party	Electoral district	First elected / previously elected	No. of terms
Ed Fast	Conservative	Abbotsford	2006	6th term
**Terry Beech** ‡	Liberal	Burnaby North—Seymour	2015	3rd term
Jagmeet Singh	New Democratic	Burnaby South	2019	3rd term
Todd Doherty	Conservative	Cariboo—Prince George	2015	3rd term
Dan Albas	Conservative	Central Okanagan—Similkameen—Nicola	2011	4th term
Mark Strahl	Conservative	Chilliwack—Hope	2011	4th term
John Aldag (until 27 May 2024)	Liberal	Cloverdale—Langley City	2015, 2021	2nd term*
Tamara Jansen (since 16 December 2024)	Conservative	Cloverdale—Langley City	2019, 2024	2nd term*
Ron McKinnon	Liberal	Coquitlam—Port Coquitlam	2015	3rd term
Gord Johns	New Democratic	Courtenay—Alberni	2015	3rd term
Alistair MacGregor	New Democratic	Cowichan—Malahat—Langford	2015	3rd term
**Carla Qualtrough**	Liberal	Delta	2015	3rd term
Randall Garrison (until January 30, 2025)	New Democratic	Esquimalt—Saanich—Sooke	2011	4th term
Ken Hardie	Liberal	Fleetwood—Port Kells	2015	3rd term
Frank Caputo	Conservative	Kamloops—Thompson—Cariboo	2021	1st term
Tracy Gray	Conservative	Kelowna—Lake Country	2019	2nd term
Rob Morrison	Conservative	Kootenay—Columbia	2019	2nd term
Tako van Popta	Conservative	Langley—Aldergrove	2019	2nd term
Brad Vis	Conservative	Mission—Matsqui—Fraser Canyon	2019	2nd term
Lisa Marie Barron	New Democratic	Nanaimo—Ladysmith	2021	1st term
Peter Julian	New Democratic	New Westminster—Burnaby	2004	7th term
Rachel Blaney	New Democratic	North Island—Powell River	2015	3rd term
Mel Arnold	Conservative	North Okanagan—Shuswap	2015	3rd term
**Jonathan Wilkinson**	Liberal	North Vancouver	2015	3rd term
Marc Dalton	Conservative	Pitt Meadows—Maple Ridge	2019	2nd term
Bonita Zarrillo	New Democratic	Port Moody—Coquitlam	2021	1st term
Bob Zimmer	Conservative	Prince George—Peace River—Northern Rockies	2011	4th term
Wilson Miao	Liberal	Richmond Centre	2021	1st term
Elizabeth May	Green	Saanich—Gulf Islands	2011	4th term
Taylor Bachrach	New Democratic	Skeena—Bulkley Valley	2019	2nd term
Richard Cannings	New Democratic	South Okanagan—West Kootenay	2015	3rd term
Kerry-Lynne Findlay	Conservative	South Surrey—White Rock	2011, (Note: Delta) 2019	3rd term*
Parm Bains	Liberal	Steveston—Richmond East	2021	1st term
Randeep Sarai ‡	Liberal	Surrey Centre	2015	3rd term
Sukh Dhaliwal	Liberal	Surrey—Newton	2006, 2015	5th term*
Hedy Fry	Liberal	Vancouver Centre	1993	10th term
Jenny Kwan	New Democratic	Vancouver East	2015	3rd term
Taleeb Noormohamed ‡	Liberal	Vancouver Granville	2021	1st term
Don Davies	New Democratic	Vancouver Kingsway	2008	5th term
**Joyce Murray**	Liberal	Vancouver Quadra	2008	6th term
**Harjit Sajjan**	Liberal	Vancouver South	2015	3rd term
Laurel Collins	New Democratic	Victoria	2019	2nd term
Patrick Weiler	Liberal	West Vancouver—Sunshine Coast—Sea to Sky Country	2019	2nd term

=== Manitoba ===
Name	Party	Electoral district	First elected / previously elected	No. of terms
Larry Maguire	Conservative	Brandon—Souris	2013	4th term
Marty Morantz	Conservative	Charleswood—St. James—Assiniboia—Headingley	2019	2nd term
Niki Ashton	New Democratic	Churchill—Keewatinook Aski	2008	5th term
Dan Mazier	Conservative	Dauphin—Swan River—Neepawa	2019	2nd term
Daniel Blaikie (until 31 March 2024)	New Democratic	Elmwood—Transcona	2015	3rd term
Leila Dance (from 16 September 2024)	New Democratic	Elmwood—Transcona	2024	1st term
Raquel Dancho	Conservative	Kildonan—St. Paul	2019	2nd term
Candice Bergen (Note: Conservative leader from 2 February – 10 September 2022) (until 28 February 2023)	Conservative	Portage—Lisgar	2008	5th term
Branden Leslie (from 19 June 2023)	Conservative	Portage—Lisgar	2023	1st term
Ted Falk	Conservative	Provencher	2013	4th term
**Dan Vandal**	Liberal	Saint Boniface—Saint Vital	2015	3rd term
James Bezan	Conservative	Selkirk—Interlake—Eastman	2004	7th term
Leah Gazan	New Democratic	Winnipeg Centre	2019	2nd term
Kevin Lamoureux ‡	Liberal	Winnipeg North	2010	5th term
**Terry Duguid** ‡	Liberal	Winnipeg South	2015	3rd term
Jim Carr (until 12 December 2022)	Liberal	Winnipeg South Centre	2015	3rd term
Ben Carr (from 19 June 2023)	Liberal	Winnipeg South Centre	2023	1st term

=== New Brunswick ===
Name	Party	Electoral district	First elected / previously elected	No. of terms
Serge Cormier	Liberal	Acadie—Bathurst	2015	3rd term
**Dominic LeBlanc**	Liberal	Beauséjour	2000	8th term
Jenica Atwin ‡	Liberal	Fredericton	2019 (Note: First elected as a Green)	2nd term
Rob Moore	Conservative	Fundy Royal	2004, 2019	6th term*
René Arseneault	Liberal	Madawaska—Restigouche	2015	3rd term
Jake Stewart	Conservative	Miramichi—Grand Lake	2021	1st term
**Ginette Petitpas Taylor**	Liberal	Moncton—Riverview—Dieppe	2015	3rd term
John Williamson	Conservative	New Brunswick Southwest	2011, 2019	3rd term*
Wayne Long	Liberal	Saint John—Rothesay	2015	3rd term
Richard Bragdon	Conservative	Tobique—Mactaquac	2019	2nd term

=== Newfoundland and Labrador ===
Name	Party	Electoral district	First elected / previously elected	No. of terms
Ken McDonald	Liberal	Avalon	2015	3rd term
Churence Rogers	Liberal	Bonavista—Burin—Trinity	2017	3rd term
Clifford Small	Conservative	Coast of Bays—Central—Notre Dame	2021	1st term
Yvonne Jones ‡	Liberal	Labrador	2013	4th term
**Gudie Hutchings**	Liberal	Long Range Mountains	2015	3rd term
**Joanne Thompson**	Liberal	St. John's East	2021	1st term
**Seamus O'Regan**	Liberal	St. John's South—Mount Pearl	2015	3rd term

=== Nova Scotia ===
Name	Party	Electoral district	First elected / previously elected	No. of terms
Mike Kelloway ‡	Liberal	Cape Breton—Canso	2019	2nd term
**Sean Fraser**	Liberal	Central Nova	2015	3rd term
Stephen Ellis	Conservative	Cumberland—Colchester	2021	1st term
**Darren Fisher** ‡	Liberal	Dartmouth—Cole Harbour	2015	3rd term
Andy Fillmore ‡ (until August 31, 2024)	Liberal	Halifax	2015	3rd term
Lena Diab	Liberal	Halifax West	2021	1st term
**Kody Blois**	Liberal	Kings—Hants	2019	2nd term
Darrell Samson ‡	Liberal	Sackville—Preston—Chezzetcook	2015	3rd term
Rick Perkins	Conservative	South Shore—St. Margarets	2021	1st term
Jaime Battiste ‡	Liberal	Sydney—Victoria	2019	2nd term
Chris d'Entremont	Conservative	West Nova	2019	2nd term

=== Ontario ===
Name	Party	Electoral district	First elected / previously elected	No. of terms
**Mark Holland**	Liberal	Ajax	2004, 2015	6th term*
Carol Hughes	New Democratic	Algoma—Manitoulin—Kapuskasing	2008	5th term
Leah Taylor Roy	Liberal	Aurora—Oak Ridges—Richmond Hill	2021	1st term
John Brassard	Conservative	Barrie—Innisfil	2015	3rd term
Doug Shipley	Conservative	Barrie—Springwater—Oro-Medonte	2019	2nd term
Ryan Williams	Conservative	Bay of Quinte	2021	1st term
**Nathaniel Erskine-Smith**	Liberal	Beaches—East York	2015	3rd term
Shafqat Ali	Liberal	Brampton Centre	2021	1st term
Maninder Sidhu ‡	Liberal	Brampton East	2019	2nd term
**Ruby Sahota**	Liberal	Brampton North	2015	3rd term
Sonia Sidhu	Liberal	Brampton South	2015	3rd term
**Kamal Khera**	Liberal	Brampton West	2015	3rd term
Larry Brock	Conservative	Brantford—Brant	2021	1st term
Alex Ruff	Conservative	Bruce—Grey—Owen Sound	2019	2nd term
**Karina Gould**	Liberal	Burlington	2015	3rd term
Bryan May ‡	Liberal	Cambridge	2015	3rd term
Pierre Poilievre (Note: Conservative leader since 10 September 2022)	Conservative	Carleton	2004	7th term
Dave Epp	Conservative	Chatham-Kent—Leamington	2019	2nd term
Julie Dzerowicz	Liberal	Davenport	2015	3rd term
Michael Coteau	Liberal	Don Valley East	2021	1st term
Han Dong	Liberal	Don Valley North	2019	2nd term
Han Dong	Independent (Note: Resigned from caucus 22 March 2023.)	Don Valley North	2019	2nd term
Rob Oliphant ‡	Liberal	Don Valley West	2008, 2015	4th term*
Kyle Seeback	Conservative	Dufferin—Caledon	2011, (Note: Brampton West) 2019	3rd term*
Erin O'Toole (until 1 August 2023) (Note: Conservative leader until 2 February 2022)	Conservative	Durham	2012	4th term
Jamil Jivani (from 4 March 2024)	Conservative	Durham	2024	1st term
**Marco Mendicino** (until 13 March 2025)	Liberal	Eglinton—Lawrence	2015	3rd term
Karen Vecchio	Conservative	Elgin—Middlesex—London	2015	3rd term
Chris Lewis	Conservative	Essex	2019	2nd term
Yvan Baker	Liberal	Etobicoke Centre	2019	2nd term
James Maloney ‡	Liberal	Etobicoke—Lakeshore	2015	3rd term
Kirsty Duncan	Liberal	Etobicoke North	2008	5th term
Dan Muys	Conservative	Flamborough—Glanbrook	2021	1st term
Francis Drouin ‡	Liberal	Glengarry—Prescott—Russell	2015	3rd term
Lloyd Longfield	Liberal	Guelph	2015	3rd term
Leslyn Lewis	Conservative	Haldimand—Norfolk	2021	1st term
Jamie Schmale	Conservative	Haliburton—Kawartha Lakes—Brock	2015	3rd term
Matthew Green	New Democratic	Hamilton Centre	2019	2nd term
Chad Collins	Liberal	Hamilton East—Stoney Creek	2021	1st term
Lisa Hepfner ‡	Liberal	Hamilton Mountain	2021	1st term
**Filomena Tassi**	Liberal	Hamilton West—Ancaster—Dundas	2015	3rd term
Shelby Kramp-Neuman	Conservative	Hastings—Lennox and Addington	2021	1st term
Judy Sgro	Liberal	Humber River—Black Creek	1999	9th term
Ben Lobb	Conservative	Huron—Bruce	2008	5th term
**Jenna Sudds** ‡	Liberal	Kanata—Carleton	2021	1st term
Eric Melillo	Conservative	Kenora	2019	2nd term
Anna Roberts	Conservative	King—Vaughan	2021	1st term
Mark Gerretsen ‡	Liberal	Kingston and the Islands	2015	3rd term
Mike Morrice	Green	Kitchener Centre	2021	1st term
Tim Louis	Liberal	Kitchener—Conestoga	2019	2nd term
Valerie Bradford	Liberal	Kitchener South—Hespeler	2021	1st term
Lianne Rood	Conservative	Lambton—Kent—Middlesex	2019	2nd term
Scott Reid	Conservative	Lanark—Frontenac—Kingston	2000	8th term
Michael Barrett	Conservative	Leeds—Grenville—Thousand Islands and Rideau Lakes	2018	3rd term
Lindsay Mathyssen	New Democratic	London—Fanshawe	2019	2nd term
Peter Fragiskatos ‡	Liberal	London North Centre	2015	3rd term
**Arielle Kayabaga**	Liberal	London West	2021	1st term
**Helena Jaczek**	Liberal	Markham—Stouffville	2019	2nd term
**Mary Ng**	Liberal	Markham—Thornhill	2017	3rd term
Paul Chiang ‡	Liberal	Markham—Unionville	2021	1st term
Adam van Koeverden ‡	Liberal	Milton	2019	2nd term
**Omar Alghabra**	Liberal	Mississauga Centre	2006, 2015	4th term*
Peter Fonseca	Liberal	Mississauga East—Cooksville	2015	3rd term
Iqra Khalid ‡	Liberal	Mississauga—Erin Mills	2015	3rd term
Sven Spengemann (until 27 May 2022)	Liberal	Mississauga—Lakeshore	2015	3rd term
Charles Sousa (from 12 December 2022) ‡	Liberal	Mississauga—Lakeshore	2022	1st term
Iqwinder Gaheer	Liberal	Mississauga—Malton	2021	1st term
**Rechie Valdez**	Liberal	Mississauga—Streetsville	2021	1st term
Chandra Arya	Liberal	Nepean	2015	3rd term
Tony Van Bynen	Liberal	Newmarket—Aurora	2019	2nd term
Vance Badawey ‡	Liberal	Niagara Centre	2015	3rd term
Tony Baldinelli	Conservative	Niagara Falls	2019	2nd term
Dean Allison	Conservative	Niagara West	2004	7th term
Marc Serré ‡	Liberal	Nickel Belt	2015	3rd term
Anthony Rota † (Note: Speaker until 27 September 2023)	Liberal	Nipissing—Timiskaming	2004, 2015	6th term*
Philip Lawrence	Conservative	Northumberland—Peterborough South	2019	2nd term
**Anita Anand**	Liberal	Oakville	2019	2nd term
Pam Damoff ‡	Liberal	Oakville North—Burlington	2015	3rd term
Marie-France Lalonde ‡	Liberal	Orléans	2019	2nd term
Colin Carrie	Conservative	Oshawa	2004	7th term
Yasir Naqvi ‡	Liberal	Ottawa Centre	2021	1st term
**David McGuinty**	Liberal	Ottawa South	2004	7th term
**Mona Fortier**	Liberal	Ottawa—Vanier	2017	3rd term
Anita Vandenbeld ‡	Liberal	Ottawa West—Nepean	2015	3rd term
Dave MacKenzie (until 28 January 2023)	Conservative	Oxford	2004	7th term
Arpan Khanna (from 19 June 2023)	Conservative	Oxford	2023	1st term
**Arif Virani** ‡	Liberal	Parkdale—High Park	2015	3rd term
Scott Aitchison	Conservative	Parry Sound-Muskoka	2019	2nd term
John Nater	Conservative	Perth Wellington	2015	3rd term
Michelle Ferreri	Conservative	Peterborough—Kawartha	2021	1st term
Jennifer O'Connell ‡	Liberal	Pickering—Uxbridge	2015	3rd term
Cheryl Gallant	Conservative	Renfrew—Nipissing—Pembroke	2000	8th term
Majid Jowhari	Liberal	Richmond Hill	2015	3rd term
Chris Bittle ‡	Liberal	St. Catharines	2015	3rd term
Marilyn Gladu	Conservative	Sarnia—Lambton	2015	3rd term
Terry Sheehan ‡	Liberal	Sault Ste. Marie	2015	3rd term
Jean Yip	Liberal	Scarborough—Agincourt	2017	3rd term
Salma Zahid	Liberal	Scarborough Centre	2015	3rd term
John McKay	Liberal	Scarborough-Guildwood	1997	9th term
Shaun Chen	Liberal	Scarborough North	2015	3rd term
**Gary Anandasangaree** ‡	Liberal	Scarborough—Rouge Park	2015	3rd term
**Bill Blair**	Liberal	Scarborough Southwest	2015	3rd term
Terry Dowdall	Conservative	Simcoe—Grey	2019	2nd term
Adam Chambers	Conservative	Simcoe North	2021	1st term
Kevin Vuong	Independent (Note: Although Vuong was elected as a Liberal, due to being charged with sexual assault prior to being a candidate, Liberal Leader Justin Trudeau stated he would not sit as a member of caucus.)	Spadina—Fort York	2021	1st term
Eric Duncan	Conservative	Stormont—Dundas—South Glengarry	2019	2nd term
Viviane Lapointe	Liberal	Sudbury	2021	1st term
Melissa Lantsman	Conservative	Thornhill	2021	1st term
Marcus Powlowski	Liberal	Thunder Bay—Rainy River	2019	2nd term
**Patty Hajdu**	Liberal	Thunder Bay—Superior North	2015	3rd term
Charlie Angus	New Democratic	Timmins-James Bay	2004	7th term
**Marci Ien**	Liberal	Toronto Centre	2020	2nd term
Julie Dabrusin ‡	Liberal	Toronto—Danforth	2015	3rd term
**Carolyn Bennett** (until 16 January 2024)	Liberal	Toronto—St. Paul's	1997	9th term
Don Stewart (from 24 June 2024)	Conservative	Toronto—St. Paul's	2024	1st term
**Chrystia Freeland**	Liberal	University—Rosedale	2013	4th term
Francesco Sorbara	Liberal	Vaughan—Woodbridge	2015	3rd term
Bardish Chagger	Liberal	Waterloo	2015	3rd term
Michael Chong	Conservative	Wellington—Halton Hills	2004	7th term
Ryan Turnbull ‡	Liberal	Whitby	2019	2nd term
**Ali Ehsassi**	Liberal	Willowdale	2015	3rd term
Irek Kusmierczyk ‡	Liberal	Windsor—Tecumseh	2019	2nd term
Brian Masse	New Democratic	Windsor West	2002	8th term
**Ya'ara Saks** ‡	Liberal	York Centre	2020	2nd term
Scot Davidson	Conservative	York—Simcoe	2019	2nd term
**Ahmed Hussen**	Liberal	York South—Weston	2015	3rd term

=== Prince Edward Island ===
Name	Party	Electoral district	First elected / previously elected	No. of terms
**Lawrence MacAulay**	Liberal	Cardigan	1988	11th term
Sean Casey	Liberal	Charlottetown	2011	4th term
Bobby Morrissey	Liberal	Egmont	2015	3rd term
Heath MacDonald	Liberal	Malpeque	2021	1st term

=== Quebec ===
Name	Party	Electoral district	First elected / previously elected	No. of terms
Sylvie Bérubé	Bloc Québécois	Abitibi—Baie-James—Nunavik—Eeyou	2019	2nd term
Sébastien Lemire	Bloc Québécois	Abitibi—Témiscamingue	2019	2nd term
**Mélanie Joly**	Liberal	Ahuntsic-Cartierville	2015	3rd term
Angelo Iacono	Liberal	Alfred-Pellan	2015	3rd term
Stéphane Lauzon ‡	Liberal	Argenteuil—La Petite-Nation	2015	3rd term
Kristina Michaud	Bloc Québécois	Avignon—La Mitis—Matane—Matapédia	2019	2nd term
Richard Lehoux	Conservative	Beauce	2019	2nd term
Caroline Desbiens	Bloc Québécois	Beauport—Côte-de-Beaupré—Île d'Orléans—Charlevoix	2019	2nd term
Julie Vignola	Bloc Québécois	Beauport—Limoilou	2019	2nd term
Louis Plamondon † (Note: Interim speaker until from 27 September 2023 to 3 October 2023)	Bloc Québécois	Bécancour—Nicolet—Saurel	1984 (Note: First elected as a Progressive Conservative)	12th term
Dominique Vien	Conservative	Bellechasse—Les Etchemins—Lévis	2021	1st term
Yves-François Blanchet	Bloc Québécois	Beloeil—Chambly	2019	2nd term
Yves Perron	Bloc Québécois	Berthier—Maskinongé	2019	2nd term
Emmanuel Dubourg	Liberal	Bourassa	2013	4th term
**Pascale St-Onge**	Liberal	Brome—Missisquoi	2021	1st term
Alexandra Mendès	Liberal	Brossard—Saint-Lambert	2008, 2015	4th term*
Pierre Paul-Hus	Conservative	Charlesbourg—Haute-Saint-Charles	2015	3rd term
Brenda Shanahan	Liberal	Châteauguay—Lacolle	2015	3rd term
Richard Martel	Conservative	Chicoutimi—Le Fjord	2018	3rd term
**Marie-Claude Bibeau**	Liberal	Compton—Stanstead	2015	3rd term
Anju Dhillon	Liberal	Dorval—Lachine—LaSalle	2015	3rd term
Martin Champoux	Bloc Québécois	Drummond	2019	2nd term
**Diane Lebouthillier**	Liberal	Gaspésie—Les Îles-de-la-Madeleine	2015	3rd term
Steven MacKinnon	Liberal	Gatineau	2015	3rd term
**Soraya Martinez Ferrada** ‡	Liberal	Hochelaga	2019	2nd term
**Pablo Rodríguez** (until January 20, 2025)	Liberal	Honoré-Mercier	2004, 2015	6th term*
**Pablo Rodríguez** (until January 20, 2025)	Independent (Note: Resigned from caucus 19 September 2024.)	Honoré-Mercier	2004, 2015	6th term*
Greg Fergus † ‡	Liberal	Hull—Aylmer	2015	3rd term
Gabriel Ste-Marie	Bloc Québécois	Joliette	2015	3rd term
Mario Simard	Bloc Québécois	Jonquière	2019	2nd term
Mario Beaulieu	Bloc Québécois	La Pointe-de-l'Île	2015	3rd term
Alain Therrien	Bloc Québécois	La Prairie	2019	2nd term
Alexis Brunelle-Duceppe	Bloc Québécois	Lac-Saint-Jean	2019	2nd term
Francis Scarpaleggia	Liberal	Lac-Saint-Louis	2004	7th term
**David Lametti** (until 1 February 2024)	Liberal	LaSalle—Émard—Verdun	2015	3rd term
Louis-Philippe Sauvé (from 16 September 2024)	Bloc Québécois	LaSalle—Émard—Verdun	2024	1st term
Marie-Hélène Gaudreau	Bloc Québécois	Laurentides—Labelle	2019	2nd term
**Steven Guilbeault**	Liberal	Laurier—Sainte-Marie	2019	2nd term
Fayçal El-Khoury	Liberal	Laval—Les Îles	2015	3rd term
Jacques Gourde	Conservative	Lévis—Lotbinière	2006	6th term
Sherry Romanado ‡	Liberal	Longueuil—Charles-LeMoyne	2015	3rd term
Denis Trudel	Bloc Québécois	Longueuil—Saint-Hubert	2019	2nd term
Joël Lightbound	Liberal	Louis-Hébert	2015	3rd term
Gérard Deltell	Conservative	Louis-Saint-Laurent	2015	3rd term
Marilène Gill	Bloc Québécois	Manicouagan	2015	3rd term
Yves Robillard	Liberal	Marc-Aurèle-Fortin	2015	3rd term
Luc Berthold	Conservative	Mégantic—L'Érable	2015	3rd term
Jean-Denis Garon	Bloc Québécois	Mirabel	2021	1st term
Stéphane Bergeron	Bloc Québécois	Montarville	1993, (Note: Verchères/Verchères—Les Patriotes) 2019	6th term*
Luc Thériault	Bloc Québécois	Montcalm	2015	3rd term
Bernard Généreux	Conservative	Montmagny—L'Islet—Kamouraska—Rivière-du-Loup	2009, 2015	4th term*
Anthony Housefather ‡	Liberal	Mount Royal	2015	3rd term
Marc Garneau (until 8 March 2023)	Liberal	Notre-Dame-de-Grâce—Westmount	2008	5th term
Anna Gainey (from 19 June 2023)	Liberal	Notre-Dame-de-Grâce—Westmount	2023	1st term
**Rachel Bendayan** ‡	Liberal	Outremont	2019	3rd term
**Justin Trudeau** (Note: Liberal leader until 9 March 2025. Prime Minister until 14 March 2025.)	Liberal	Papineau	2008	5th term
Xavier Barsalou-Duval	Bloc Québécois	Pierre-Boucher—Les Patriotes—Verchères	2015	3rd term
Sameer Zuberi ‡	Liberal	Pierrefonds—Dollard	2019	2nd term
Sophie Chatel	Liberal	Pontiac	2021	1st term
Joël Godin	Conservative	Portneuf—Jacques-Cartier	2015	3rd term
**Jean-Yves Duclos**	Liberal	Québec	2015	3rd term
Monique Pauzé	Bloc Québécois	Repentigny	2015	3rd term
Alain Rayes	Conservative	Richmond—Arthabaska	2015	3rd term
Alain Rayes	Independent (Note: Resigned from caucus 13 September 2022.)	Richmond—Arthabaska	2015	3rd term
Maxime Blanchette-Joncas	Bloc Québécois	Rimouski-Neigette—Témiscouata—Les Basques	2019	2nd term
Luc Desilets	Bloc Québécois	Rivière-des-Mille-Îles	2019	2nd term
Rhéal Fortin	Bloc Québécois	Rivière-du-Nord	2015	3rd term
Alexandre Boulerice	New Democratic	Rosemont—La Petite-Patrie	2011	4th term
Simon-Pierre Savard-Tremblay	Bloc Québécois	Saint-Hyacinthe—Bagot	2019	2nd term
Christine Normandin	Bloc Québécois	Saint-Jean	2019	2nd term
Emmanuella Lambropoulos	Liberal	Saint-Laurent	2017	3rd term
Patricia Lattanzio	Liberal	Saint-Léonard—Saint-Michel	2019	2nd term
**François-Philippe Champagne**	Liberal	Saint-Maurice—Champlain	2015	3rd term
Claude DeBellefeuille	Bloc Québécois	Salaberry—Suroît	2006, 2019	4th term*
Andréanne Larouche	Bloc Québécois	Shefford	2019	2nd term
**Élisabeth Brière** ‡	Liberal	Sherbrooke	2019	2nd term
Nathalie Sinclair-Desgagné	Bloc Québécois	Terrebonne	2021	1st term
Louise Chabot	Bloc Québécois	Thérèse-De Blainville	2019	2nd term
René Villemure	Bloc Québécois	Trois-Rivières	2021	1st term
Peter Schiefke	Liberal	Vaudreuil—Soulanges	2015	3rd term
**Marc Miller**	Liberal	Ville-Marie—Le Sud-Ouest—Île-des-Sœurs	2015	3rd term
Annie Koutrakis ‡	Liberal	Vimy	2019	2nd term

=== Saskatchewan ===
Name	Party	Electoral district	First elected / previously elected	No. of terms
Rosemarie Falk	Conservative	Battlefords—Lloydminster	2017	3rd term
Kelly Block	Conservative	Carlton Trail—Eagle Creek	2008	5th term
Jeremy Patzer	Conservative	Cypress Hills—Grasslands	2019	2nd term
Gary Vidal	Conservative	Desnethé—Missinippi—Churchill River	2019	2nd term
Fraser Tolmie	Conservative	Moose Jaw—Lake Centre—Lanigan	2021	1st term
Randy Hoback	Conservative	Prince Albert	2008	5th term
Warren Steinley	Conservative	Regina—Lewvan	2019	2nd term
Andrew Scheer	Conservative	Regina—Qu'Appelle	2004	7th term
Michael Kram	Conservative	Regina—Wascana	2019	2nd term
Kevin Waugh	Conservative	Saskatoon—Grasswood	2015	3rd term
Corey Tochor	Conservative	Saskatoon—University	2019	2nd term
Brad Redekopp	Conservative	Saskatoon West	2019	2nd term
Robert Kitchen	Conservative	Souris—Moose Mountain	2015	3rd term
Cathay Wagantall	Conservative	Yorkton—Melville	2015	3rd term

=== Territories ===
Name	Party	Electoral district	First elected / previously elected	No. of terms
Michael McLeod	Liberal	Northwest Territories	2015	3rd term
Lori Idlout	New Democratic	Nunavut	2021	1st term
Brendan Hanley	Liberal	Yukon	2021	1st term

== Changes since the 2021 election ==
=== Membership changes ===
Date	District	Name	Party before	Party after	Reason
May 27, 2022	Mississauga—Lakeshore	Sven Spengemann	Liberal	Vacant	Resigned to accept a position with the United Nations
September 13, 2022	Richmond—Arthabaska	Alain Rayes	Conservative	Independent	Resigned from caucus following Pierre Poilievre's election as leader
December 12, 2022	Winnipeg South Centre	Jim Carr	Liberal	Vacant	Died of multiple myeloma and kidney failure
December 12, 2022	Mississauga—Lakeshore	Charles Sousa	Vacant	Liberal	Elected in a by-election
December 31, 2022	Calgary Heritage	Bob Benzen	Conservative	Vacant	Resigned in order to return to the private sector
January 28, 2023	Oxford	Dave MacKenzie	Conservative	Vacant	Resigned
February 28, 2023	Portage—Lisgar	Candice Bergen	Conservative	Vacant	Resigned
March 8, 2023	Notre-Dame-de-Grâce—Westmount	Marc Garneau	Liberal	Vacant	Resigned
March 22, 2023	Don Valley North	Han Dong	Liberal	Independent	Resigned from caucus
June 19, 2023	Winnipeg South Centre	Ben Carr	Vacant	Liberal	Elected in a by-election
June 19, 2023	Notre-Dame-de-Grâce—Westmount	Anna Gainey	Vacant	Liberal	Elected in a by-election
June 19, 2023	Oxford	Arpan Khanna	Vacant	Conservative	Elected in a by-election
June 19, 2023	Portage—Lisgar	Branden Leslie	Vacant	Conservative	Elected in a by-election
July 24, 2023	Calgary Heritage	Shuvaloy Majumdar	Vacant	Conservative	Elected in a by-election
August 1, 2023	Durham	Erin O'Toole	Conservative	Vacant	Resigned
January 16, 2024	Toronto—St. Paul's	Carolyn Bennett	Liberal	Vacant	Resigned
February 1, 2024	LaSalle—Émard—Verdun	David Lametti	Liberal	Vacant	Resigned to join a law firm
March 4, 2024	Durham	Jamil Jivani	Vacant	Conservative	Elected in a by-election
March 31, 2024	Elmwood—Transcona	Daniel Blaikie	New Democratic	Vacant	Resigned to work for Manitoba premier Wab Kinew as special advisor
May 27, 2024	Cloverdale—Langley City	John Aldag	Liberal	Vacant	Resigned to seek the BC NDP nomination for Langley-Abbotsford in the 2024 British Columbia general election
June 24, 2024	Toronto—St. Paul's	Don Stewart	Vacant	Conservative	Elected in a by-election
August 31, 2024	Halifax	Andy Fillmore	Liberal	Vacant	Resigned to run in the 2024 Halifax mayoral election
September 16, 2024	LaSalle—Émard—Verdun	Louis-Philippe Sauvé	Vacant	Bloc Québécois	Elected in a by-election
September 16, 2024	Elmwood—Transcona	Leila Dance	Vacant	New Democratic	Elected in a by-election
September 19, 2024	Honoré-Mercier	Pablo Rodriguez	Liberal	Independent	Resigned from caucus to seek the leadership of the Quebec Liberal Party
December 16, 2024	Cloverdale—Langley City	Tamara Jansen	Vacant	Conservative	Elected in a by-election
January 20, 2025	Honoré-Mercier	Pablo Rodriguez	Independent	Vacant	Resigned
January 30, 2025	Esquimalt—Saanich—Sooke	Randall Garrison	New Democratic	Vacant	Resigned
March 13, 2025	Eglinton—Lawrence	Marco Mendicino	Liberal	Vacant	Resigned to become Chief of Staff to the Prime Minister

=== Standings ===
Number of members per party by date	2021	2022				2023							2024											2025		
Number of members per party by date	Sep 20	Mar 22	May 27	Sep 13	Dec 31	Jan 28	Feb 28	Mar 8	Mar 22	Jun 19	Jul 24	Aug 1	Jan 16	Feb 1	Mar 4	Mar 31	May 27	Jun 24	Aug 31	Sep 4	Sep 16	Sep 19	Dec 16	Jan 20	Jan 30	Mar 14
Liberal	159		158 (Note: The Liberals briefly fell to 157 seats on December 12, 2022, during the period between Jim Carr's death and Charles Sousa's by-election victory in Mississauga—Lakeshore. During this period the government majority shrunk to -22, and the number of vacant seats rose to 2.)					157	156	158			157	156			155		154			153				152
Conservative	119			118	117	116	115			117	118	117			118			119					120			
Bloc Québécois	32																				33					
New Democratic	25															24					25				24	
Green	2																									
Independent	1			2					3													4		3		
Total members	338		337		336	335	334	333		337	338	337	336	335	336	335	334	335	334		336		337	336	335	334
Government majority	-20			-21		-19	-18	-19	-21		-22	-21	-22	-23	-24	-25	-26	-27	-28		-30	-31	-32	-31	-30	-31
Government majority with C & S measures (Note: The Liberal and New Democratic (NDP) parties reach a confidence and supply agreement on 22 March 2022.) (Note: The New Democratic Party rescinds its confidence and supply agreement with the Liberal Party on September 4, 2024.)	N/A	30		29		31	32	31	29		28	29	28	27	26	25	24	23	22		23	22	N/A			
Vacant	0		1		2	3	4	5		1	0	1	2	3	2	3	4	3	4		2		1	2	3	4
