= 2017 Markham—Thornhill federal by-election =

← 2015	April 3, 2017	2019 →

Riding of Markham—Thornhill
- Registered: 69,838
- Turnout: 27.51% (▼33.63%)
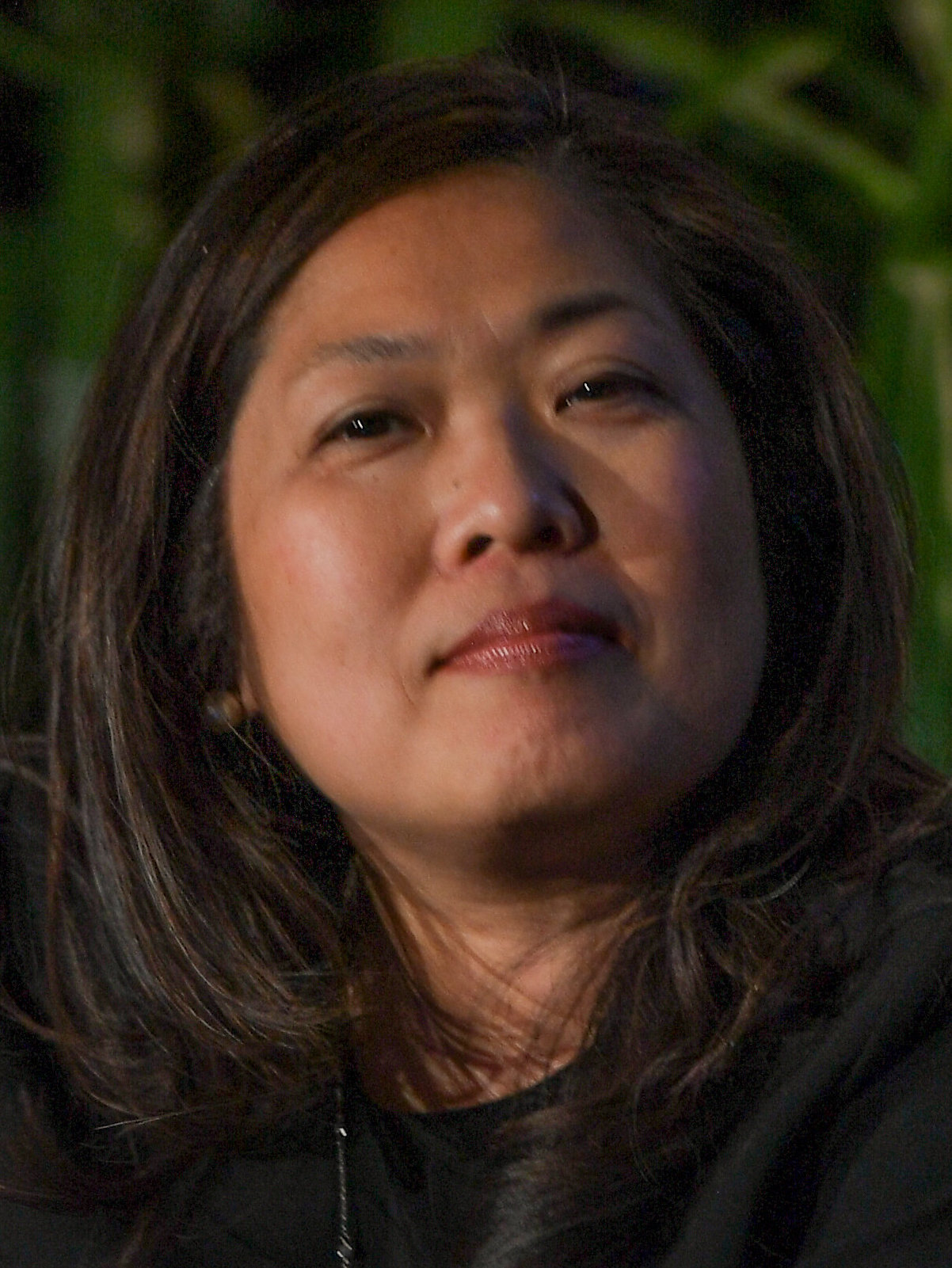
	First party	Second party
		CPC
Candidate	Mary Ng	Ragavan Paranchothy
Party	Liberal	Conservative
Popular vote	9,856	7,501
Percentage	51.53%	39.22%
Swing	▼4.19%	▲6.91%
MP before election
John McCallum
Liberal
Elected MP
Mary Ng
Liberal

A by-election was held in the federal riding of Markham—Thornhill in Ontario, Canada on 3 April 2017 following the resignation of Liberal MP and Minister of Immigration John McCallum, who was appointed to a diplomatic post. The seat was held by the Liberal candidate Mary Ng on a reduced majority.

The by-election was scheduled to coincide with four others across the country; Calgary Heritage, Calgary Midnapore, Ottawa—Vanier and Saint-Laurent.

== Background ==
=== Constituency ===
The riding is located in the York region outside Toronto, centring on Markham and Thornhill. The riding has an Asian Canadian majority.

=== Representation ===
The riding of Markham—Thornhill was vacated on February 1, 2017, following the appointment of Liberal MP and Minister of Immigration, Refugees and Citizenship John McCallum as Ambassador to China. The electoral district was created for the 2015 federal election and has had McCallum as its only MP, however McCallum had represented predecessor ridings from which Markham—Thornhill was created since the 2000 federal election.

== Campaign ==
The by-election, held on April 3, 2017, was announced on February 22, 2017. The Speaker's warrant regarding the vacancy was received on February 6, 2017; under the Parliament of Canada Act the writ for the by-election had to be issued no earlier than February 17, 2017, and no later than August 5, 2017. The election date must be set to be a Monday at least 36 days after the writ is issued.

== Candidates ==
Justin Trudeau's director of appointments and former senior Queen's Park staffer Mary Ng, defeated small business owner Nadeem Quereshi and technology entrepreneur Afraj Gill for the Liberal nomination on March 4, 2017. Ontario cabinet minister and Markham—Unionville MPP Michael Chan, 2015 Markham—Unionville Liberal candidate Bang-Gu Jiang, businesswoman Sofia Sun, and former city councillor Khalid Usman were rumoured to be possible candidates but all of them ultimately endorsed Ng. Other speculated candidates for the Liberal nomination who did not run included Markham Regional councillor Jack Heath and Markham Mayor Frank Scarpitti.

Liberal nomination contestant and school trustee Juanita Nathan initially ran for her party's nomination but withdrew in protest of the Liberal Party's handling of the nomination process.

Radio host and newspaper columnist Gavan Paranchothy defeated CIBC economist Theodore Antony, former senior Queen's Park staffer Lara Coombs, former Don Valley East MP Joe Daniel, and parental rights advocate John Himanen for the Conservative Party nomination on March 8. Paranchothy previously ran for the party in 2011 in Scarborough Southwest.

Small business owner Gregory Hines defeated insurance broker Marco Coletta for the NDP nomination. Hines previously ran for the party in Markham—Stouffville in 2015.

Independent candidate Above Znoneofthe is a resident of Oshawa, formerly named Sheldon Bergson, who legally changed his name in 2015 so that he could register as a "none of the above" protest candidate in the 2015 federal election; although he did not complete the process in time to register for that election, he first ran in the provincial Whitby—Oshawa by-election of 2016. He has since registered as a candidate in several other provincial and federal by-elections.

== Results ==
Canadian federal by-election, April 3, 2017: Markham—Thornhill Resignation of John McCallum
Party	Candidate	Votes	%	±%
Liberal	Mary Ng	9,856	51.53	−4.19
Conservative	Ragavan Paranchothy	7,501	39.22	+6.91
New Democratic	Gregory Hines	671	3.51	−7.21
Progressive Canadian	Dorian Baxter	566	2.96	
Green	Caryn Bergmann	426	2.23	+0.98
Libertarian	Brendan Thomas Reilly	118	0.62	
Independent	Above Znoneofthe	77	0.40	
Total valid votes/expense limit		19,125	100.0	–
Total rejected ballots			-	
Turnout		27.51		
Eligible voters		69,838		
Liberal hold		Swing		−5.55

== 2015 results ==
2015 Canadian federal election
Party	Candidate	Votes	%	±%	Expenditures
Liberal	John McCallum	23,878	55.72	+18.61	$78,406.90
Conservative	Jobson Easow	13,849	32.31	-4.08	$128,323.59
New Democratic	Senthi Chelliah	4,595	10.72	-12.67	$48,598.52
Green	Joshua Russell	535	1.25	-1.37	–
Total valid votes/Expense limit		42,857	100.00		$203,953.81
Total rejected ballots		240	0.56	–	
Turnout		43,097	61.14	–	
Eligible voters		70,484			
Liberal notional hold		Swing		+11.34	
Source: Elections Canada
