= 2017 Ottawa—Vanier federal by-election =

Canadian by-election

A by-election was held in the federal riding of Ottawa—Vanier in Ontario, Canada on 3 April 2017 following the death of Mauril Bélanger on August 16, 2016. The safe seat was held by the Liberal candidate Mona Fortier on a reduced majority.

The by-election was scheduled to coincide with four others across the country; Calgary Heritage, Calgary Midnapore, Markham—Thornhill and Saint-Laurent.

== Background ==
=== Constituency ===
The riding, with a large Franco-Ontarian population in Vanier, is one of the most solidly Liberal in the country, having elected Liberals both federally and provincially in every election since its creation. In fact, the previous electoral district which comprises most of the constituency, Russell, had been solidly Liberal since 1887. The riding is home to many civil servants and generally corresponds to the wards of Beacon Hill-Cyrville, Rideau-Rockcliffe and Rideau-Vanier.

=== Representation ===
Mauril Bélanger until his death on August 16, 2016, from amyotrophic lateral sclerosis (also known as Lou Gehrig's disease). The riding was one of the most solidly Liberal in the country, having elected Liberals both federally and provincially in every election since its creation in 1935. The Speaker's warrant regarding the vacancy was received on August 23, 2016.

== Candidates ==
After several prominent potential candidates, including Bélanger's widow Catherine Bélanger, Ottawa councillors Tobi Nussbaum and Tim Tierney, and 2014 council candidate Catherine Fortin LeFaivre declined to run, eight candidates sought the Liberal nomination: Senate staffer Khatera Akbari, lawyer Jean Claude Dubuisson, communications consultant Mona Fortier, Liberal staffer Eric Khaiat, former Cape Breton Highlands—Canso MP Francis LeBlanc, public servant Ainsley Malhotra, former executive director of The Humanitarian Coalition Nicolas Moyer, and Unique FM executive director Véronique Soucy. Up to 6,500 party members were eligible to vote in the nomination contest. Mona Fortier won the nomination on February 5, 2017.

Unsuccessful 2015 candidate Emilie Taman, a University of Ottawa law professor and daughter of former Supreme Court Justice Louise Arbour, ran again for the NDP.

Parliament Hill staffer Adrian Papara defeated former New Brunswick MLA Joel Bernard for the Conservative Party nomination, decided on February 16.

Educator and community activist Nira Dookeran was the Green candidate.

== Results ==
Canadian federal by-election, April 3, 2017: Ottawa—Vanier Death of Mauril Bélanger
Party	Candidate	Votes	%	±%
Liberal	Mona Fortier	15,195	51.33	−6.24
New Democratic	Emilie Taman	8,557	28.91	+9.66
Conservative	Adrian Paul Papara	4,484	15.15	−3.96
Green	Nira Dookeran	999	3.37	+0.26
Independent	John Turmel	147	0.50	
Libertarian	Damien Wilson	122	0.41	−0.30
Independent	Christina Wilson	99	0.33	
Total valid votes/expense limit		29,603	100.0	–
Total rejected ballots		176	-	
Turnout		29,779		
Eligible voters		86,404		
Liberal hold		Swing		−7.91
Source: Elections Canada

== 2015 results ==
2015 Canadian federal election
Party	Candidate	Votes	%	±%	Expenditures
Liberal	Mauril Bélanger	36,474	57.57	+19.47	$163,698.89
New Democratic	Emilie Taman	12,194	19.25	-9.43	$123,293.39
Conservative	David Piccini	12,109	19.11	-8.84	$74,698.91
Green	Nira Dookeran	1,947	3.07	-1.99	$8,775.54
Libertarian	Coreen Corcoran	503	0.79	–	$747.12
Marxist–Leninist	Christian Legeais	128	0.2	-0.03	–
Total valid votes/Expense limit		63,355	100.0		$219,479.72
Total rejected ballots		418	–	–	
Turnout		63,773	–	–	
Eligible voters		83,570			
Source: Elections Canada
