= Tim Hodgson =

Canadian politician

The Honourable Tim Hodgson PC MP
- Hodgson in 2026

Minister of Energy and Natural Resources
- Incumbent
- Assumed office May 13, 2025
- Prime Minister: Mark Carney
- Preceded by: Jonathan Wilkinson

Member of Parliament for Markham—Thornhill
- Incumbent
- Assumed office April 28, 2025
- Preceded by: Mary Ng

Personal details
- Born: Timothy Edward Hodgson Winnipeg, Manitoba, Canada
- Party: Liberal
- Spouse: Linda
- Children: 2
- Education: University of Manitoba (BCom); Ivey Business School (MBA)
- Website: timhodgson.libparl.ca

Timothy Edward Hodgson is a Canadian politician who has been Minister of Energy and Natural Resources since 2025. A member of the Liberal Party, Hodgson was elected to the House of Commons in the 2025 federal election, serving as the member of Parliament (MP) for Markham—Thornhill. Prior to entering politics, Hodgson worked in finance; he was CEO of Goldman Sachs Canada and has worked at the Bank of Canada, PwC, and served in the Canadian Armed Forces.

== Early life, family and education ==
Hodgson was born in Winnipeg, Manitoba. His maternal grandmother was born in Moose Jaw, when it was still part of Northwest Territories before the creation of Saskatchewan. Hodgson's mother, Marianne Hodgson (nee Curlette) was born in Calgary, Alberta, graduated with a Bachelor of Nursing degree from the University of Manitoba in 1980, became the director of patient care at Regina General Hospital in 1985, and became the President of the Saskatchewan Registered Nurses Association (SRNA) in 1988. Hodgson's father, Colin Hodgson, was born to a family of farmers in northern England, but chose to pursue a career with the Royal Canadian Air Force when he immigrated to Canada after completing his high school education. Due to his father's military career, Hodgson grew up in locations across Canada, including Holberg, British Columbia; Gypsumville, Manitoba; Winnipeg, Manitoba; Markham, Ontario; and Barrington Passage, Nova Scotia.

Following his father's example, Hodgson joined the Canadian Armed Forces out of high school when he was 17. He served as a reserve officer in the Canadian Armed Forces between 1979 and 1985, during which time he also studied at the University of Manitoba, graduating with a Bachelor of Commerce degree in accounting and finance in 1983, and worked as a chartered accountant with PwC in Winnipeg. In 1988, he graduated from the Ivey Business School at University of Western Ontario with a Master of Business Administration (MBA) degree.

== Financial career ==
From 1990 to 2010, Hodgson held various positions in New York, London, Silicon Valley and Toronto with Goldman Sachs and served as CEO of Goldman Sachs Canada from 2005 to 2010. He worked with Mark Carney at Goldman Sachs and joined the Bank of Canada as special adviser to him in 2010, when Carney was governor. Before the 2025 election, Hodgson was the chair of Hydro One. He took an unpaid leave of absence as chair of the board of directors at Hydro One in order to stand in the election. He also stepped away from the board of the Ontario Teachers' Pension Plan, where he was vice-chair of the investment committee.

Hodgson served as a board member for Calgary-based oil sands producer MEG Energy from 2016 to 2019.

== Political career ==
With incumbent Liberal Markham—Thornhill MP Mary Ng declining to seek re-election, Hodgson was recruited by Liberal leader Carney to contest the riding in the 2025 federal election. He was elected the riding's MP on April 28, 2025, and joined the 30th Canadian Ministry that May as Minister of Energy and Natural Resources. Hodgson was reportedly heavily involved in the defection of MP Michael Ma to the Liberal Party.

At the time of the 2025 Canadian federal election, he lived in Toronto.

== Electoral record ==
2025 Canadian federal election: Markham—Thornhill
Party	Candidate	Votes	%	±%	Expenditures
Liberal	Tim Hodgson	27,504	54.54	–7.00	
Conservative	Lionel Loganathan	21,003	41.65	+15.27	
New Democratic	Aftab Qureshi	1,022	2.03	–6.33	
People's	Mimi Lee	747	1.48	–0.24	
Centrist	Haider Qureshi	153	0.30	N/A	
Total valid votes/expense limit					
Total rejected ballots					
Turnout		50,429	63.77		
Eligible voters		79,081			
Liberal notional hold		Swing		–11.14	
Source: Elections Canada

Order of precedence
Preceded by Mandy Gull-Masty as Member of the Cabinet	Order of Precedence of Canada as Member of the Cabinet	Succeeded by Joël Lightbound as Member of the Cabinet
