= 2023 Calgary Heritage federal by-election =

Federal by-election in Alberta, Canada

- July 24, 2023

Riding of Calgary Heritage
- Turnout: 28.83%
	First party	Second party	Third party
	CPC	LPC	NDP
Candidate	Shuvaloy Majumdar	Elliot Weinstein	Gurmit Bhachu
Party	Conservative	Liberal	New Democratic
Popular vote	15,803	3,463	3,425
Percentage	65.54%	14.36%	14.21
Swing	▲7.89	▼2.37	▼3.20
MP before election
Bob Benzen
Conservative
Elected MP
Shuvaloy Majumdar
Conservative

A by-election was held in the federal riding of Calgary Heritage in Alberta, Canada on July 24, 2023, following the resignation of Conservative MP Bob Benzen.

== Background ==
=== Constituency ===
Calgary Heritage covers the southwestern corner of Calgary. The electoral district was created for the 2015 federal election and is largely composed of the former riding of Calgary Southwest which was held by conservative parties throughout its existence. Calgary Heritage is considered a safe seat for the Conservatives. This part of Calgary has been represented by centre-right parties continuously since the 1972 election.

=== Representation ===
The riding of Calgary Heritage was vacated on December 31, 2022 following the October 20 announcement from Conservative MP Bob Benzen that he would resign his seat by the end of the year in order to return to the private sector. Benzen had held the seat since a 2017 by-election in which he was elected to replace former Prime Minister and former Conservative leader Stephen Harper. The by-election was called for July 24, 2023, following the conclusion of the 2023 Alberta general election.

== Candidates ==
Shuvaloy Majumdar, global director for Harper's international consulting firm Harper & Associates defeated former parliamentary staffer Quinn Heffron for the Conservative nomination. Elliot Weinstein was acclaimed as the candidate for the Liberal Party. The People's Party of Canada Nominated PPC Western Lieutenant Kelly Lorencz as their candidate, who contested Red Deer—Mountain View, He defeated Bailey Bedard in the nomination. In April 2023, the Green Party chose Ravenmoon Crocker as their candidate. On July 3, 2023, the Maverick Party announced Dan Irving as their candidate.

== Results ==
Canadian federal by-election, July 24, 2023: Calgary Heritage Resignation of Bob Benzen
Party	Candidate	Votes	%	±%	Expenditures
Conservative	Shuvaloy Majumdar	15,853	65.63	+7.97	$116,908.12
Liberal	Elliot Weinstein	3,465	14.34	–2.39	$72,324.59
New Democratic	Gurmit Bhachu	3,429	14.20	–3.21	$10,675.70
People's	Kelly Lorencz	656	2.72	–2.29	none listed
Green	Ravenmoon Crocker	407	1.68	+0.25	$2,523.51
Christian Heritage	Larry R. Heather	144	0.60	–	$4,107.07
Maverick	Dan Irving	131	0.54	–0.79	$12,547.04
No Affiliation	Donovan Eckstrom	71	0.29	–	none listed
Total valid votes/expense limit		24,156	99.76	–	$125,117.21
Total rejected ballots		57	0.24	–0.35	
Turnout		24,213	28.89	–37.29	
Eligible voters		83,799			
Conservative hold		Swing		+2.79	
Source: Elections Canada

== 2021 result ==
2021 Canadian federal election: Calgary Heritage
Party	Candidate	Votes	%	±%	Expenditures
Conservative	Bob Benzen	30,870	57.66	–13.06	$67,437.01
New Democratic	Kathleen M. Johnson	9,320	17.41	+8.27	$1,119.48
Liberal	Scott Forsyth	8,960	16.73	+2.77	$8,531.08
People's	Bailey Bedard	2,682	5.01	+3.06	$2,115.28
Green	Malka Labell	766	1.43	–2.08	$21.70
Maverick	Annelise Freeman	714	1.33	–	$4,651.15
Rhinoceros	Mark Dejewski	230	0.43	–	none listed
Total valid votes/expense limit		53,542	99.42	–	$111,217.22
Total rejected ballots		313	0.58	+0.13	
Turnout		53,855	66.18	–4.47	
Eligible voters		81,375			
Conservative hold		Swing		-10.66	
Source: Elections Canada

== See also ==
- 2017 Calgary Heritage federal by-election
