= Shuvaloy Majumdar =

Canadian politician

Shuvaloy Majumdar MP
- শুভালয় মজুমদার

Member of Parliament for Calgary Heritage
- Incumbent
- Assumed office July 24, 2023
- Preceded by: Bob Benzen

Personal details
- Born: 1979 or 1980 (age 46–47) Calgary, Alberta, Canada
- Party: Conservative
- Education: University of Calgary

Shuvaloy "Shuv" Majumdar MP (Bengali: শুভালয় মজুমদার; born 1979/1980) is a Canadian politician, foreign policy advisor, and former consultant. A member of the Conservative Party of Canada, Majumdar was elected to serve as Member of Parliament for Calgary Heritage in a 2023 by-election.

== Early life and education ==
Shuvaloy Majumdar was born in Calgary, Alberta to Indian immigrant parents of Bengali Hindu origin. He attended the University of Calgary. While a student at the University of Calgary, he became friends with current Conservative Leader Pierre Poilievre. They reportedly met within the university's Reform Party campus club.

== Career ==
Majumdar was a ministerial staffer for international trade minister Bev Oda. He also served as policy director to Canadian foreign minister John Baird and worked alongside Jason Kenney when he was defence minister.

From 2006-2010, he worked for International Republican Institute. Majumdar was a visiting foreign policy scholar at the Liu Institute for Global Issues at the University of British Columbia and was recruited by Reform Party Leader Preston Manning to work at the Manning Centre for Building Democracy for a couple of years.

Following the 2015 Canadian federal election, Majumdar was hired by the Macdonald-Laurier Institute to lead its foreign policy and national security program until January 1, 2023. While working at MLI, Majumdar worked for Stephen Harper's consulting firm, Harper & Associates as their Global Director.

In 2019, it was revealed that Majumdar's name was mentioned as an organizer in the "Kamikaze campaign" scandal. However, after conducting an intensive investigation with 65 investigators, almost 1,800 interviews, the RCMP found no evidence of wrongdoing and laid no charges of fraud.

=== Member of the House of Commons ===
Majumdar was elected to the House of Commons in a 2023 by-election following the resignation of Bob Benzen. Upon his election, he became the third Conservative MP serving at that time of South Asian descent. Shuvaloy is a former member of the Standing Committee on Public Health, which he served on from fall of 2023 to early 2024. He currently serves as a member of the Subcommittee on International Human Rights.

== Electoral Record ==
2025 Canadian federal election: Calgary Heritage
Party	Candidate	Votes	%	±%	Expenditures
Conservative	Shuvaloy Majumdar	42,088	61.45	+3.13	$103,932.81
Liberal	Scott Arnott	23,673	34.56	+18.37	$37,536.87
New Democratic	Becki Zimmerman	1,691	2.47	–14.81	$387.96
Green	Ravenmoon Crocker	493	0.72	–0.70	none listed
Independent	Chris Galas	280	0.41	–	$4,398.31
Christian Heritage	Larry R. Heather	268	0.39	–	$1,277.09
Total valid votes/expense limit		68,493	99.46	–	$138,223.89
Total rejected ballots		372	0.54	+0.30	
Turnout		68,865	73.64	+44.75	
Eligible voters		93,515			
Conservative notional hold		Swing		–7.62	
Note: Change in percentage value and swing are calculated from the redistributed results of the 2021 general election, not the July 2023 by-election.
Source: Elections Canada

Canadian federal by-election, July 24, 2023: Calgary Heritage Resignation of Bob Benzen
Party	Candidate	Votes	%	±%	Expenditures
Conservative	Shuvaloy Majumdar	15,853	65.63	+7.97	$116,908.12
Liberal	Elliot Weinstein	3,465	14.34	–2.39	$72,324.59
New Democratic	Gurmit Bhachu	3,429	14.20	–3.21	$10,675.70
People's	Kelly Lorencz	656	2.72	–2.29	none listed
Green	Ravenmoon Crocker	407	1.68	+0.25	$2,523.51
Christian Heritage	Larry R. Heather	144	0.60	–	$4,107.07
Maverick	Dan Irving	131	0.54	–0.79	$12,547.04
No Affiliation	Donovan Eckstrom	71	0.29	–	none listed
Total valid votes/expense limit		24,156	99.76	–	$125,117.21
Total rejected ballots		57	0.24	–0.35	
Turnout		24,213	28.89	–37.29	
Eligible voters		83,799			
Conservative hold		Swing		+2.79	
Source: Elections Canada
