= Mary Ng =

Canadian politician

The Honourable Mary Ng PC
- 伍鳳儀
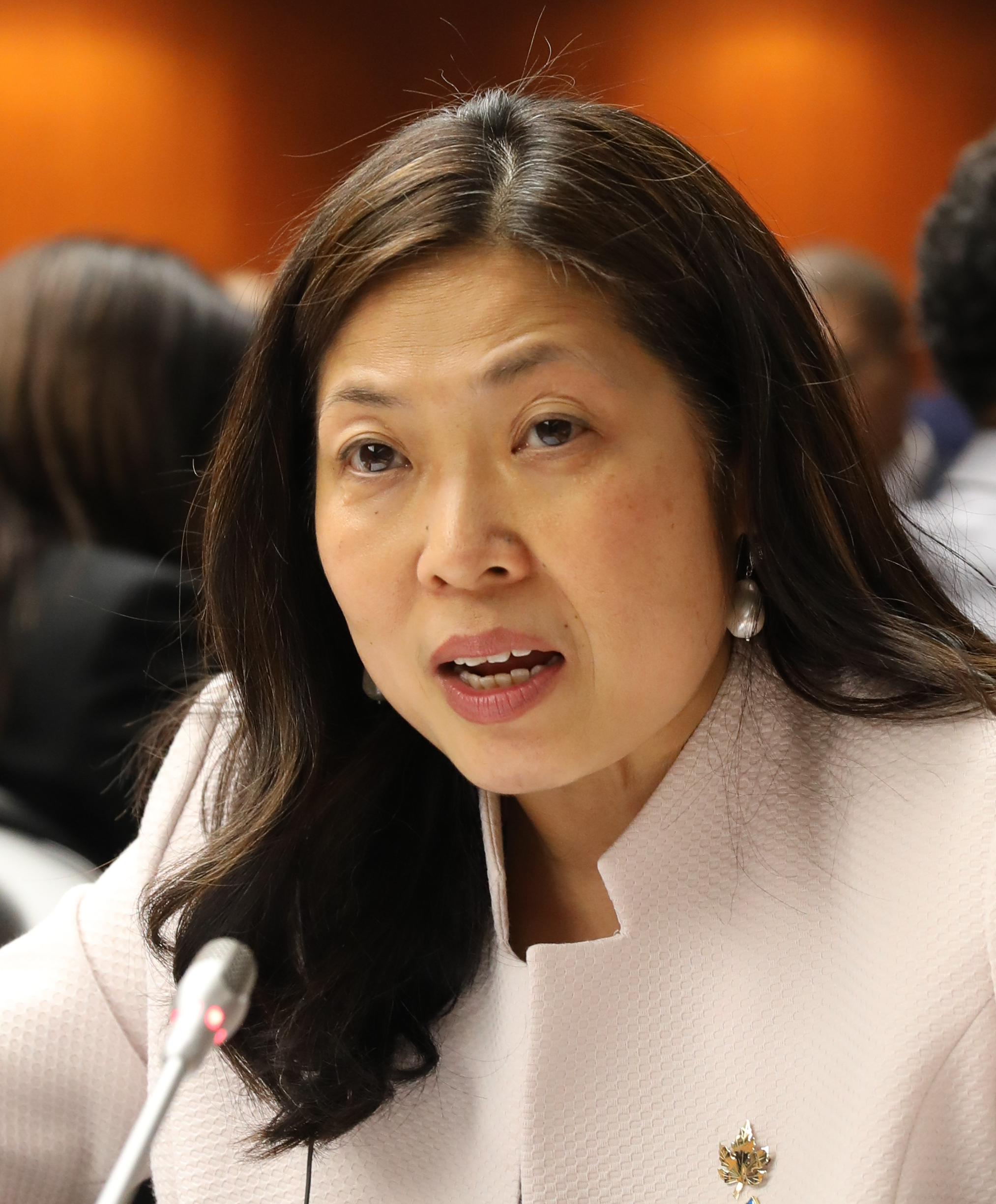
- Ng in 2022

Minister of Export Promotion, International Trade and Economic Development
- In office July 18, 2018 – March 14, 2025
- Prime Minister: Justin Trudeau
- Preceded by: Bardish Chagger (Minister of Small Business and Tourism); Jim Carr (Minister of International Trade Diversification)
- Succeeded by: Dominic LeBlanc

Member of Parliament for Markham—Thornhill
- In office April 3, 2017 – April 28, 2025
- Preceded by: John McCallum
- Succeeded by: Tim Hodgson

Personal details
- Born: December 16, 1968 (age 57) British Hong Kong
- Party: Liberal
- Education: University of Toronto

Mary Ng
- Traditional Chinese: 伍鳳儀
- Simplified Chinese: 伍凤仪
Transcriptions
Standard Mandarin
- Hanyu Pinyin: Wǔ Fèngyí
Yue: Cantonese
- Jyutping: Ng5 Fung6-ji4

Mary Ng (born December 16, 1968) is a Canadian former politician who was Minister of Export Promotion, International Trade and Economic Development from 2018 to 2025. A member of the Liberal Party, she served as the member of Parliament (MP) for Markham—Thornhill from 2017 to 2025. Ng is Canada's longest-serving trade minister. She did not seek re-election in 2025.

== Early life ==
Ng was born in British Hong Kong on December 16, 1968 (age 57), and is the eldest child of three. In 1976, Ng's parents, Ng Yin-Foo and Ng Wan Lin, immigrated to Canada from Hong Kong. Her family settled in Toronto, where they opened a restaurant called Kahing, which means “family” in Cantonese. She graduated from the Scarborough campus of the University of Toronto with a degree in political science.

== Career ==
Ng has worked for over 20 years in the public service, focusing on the areas of education, women's leadership, job-creation, and entrepreneurship. Before entering politics, Ng worked in the Government of Ontario in the Cabinet Office, with the Ontario Ministry of the Attorney General, and the Ontario Ministry of Education. She has also worked for Toronto Metropolitan University (formerly Ryerson) in the President’s Office, and served as Director of Public Appointments in the Office of Prime Minister Justin Trudeau.

=== Post-politics ===
In April 2025, Ng was a noted speaker at a plenary session of the WTO's 30th anniversary conference. Ng joined trade, business and civil society leaders from around the globe to offer insight on what will shape the organization’s efforts over the next 30 years.

== Federal politics ==
Following the resignation of Markham—Thornhill MP John McCallum in February 2017, Ng announced her candidacy for the nomination of the Liberal Party for the riding. Ng won the nomination against two other candidates and went on to win the seat with 51.5 per cent of the vote in a riding by-election held on April 3 that year. Ng went on to win the seat again in the 2019 Canadian federal election with 53.9 per cent of the vote, and in the 2021 Canadian federal election with 61.5 per cent of the vote.

=== Member of Parliament ===
Ng helped to facilitate the government's commitment to invest in Canadian ideas and innovators in the riding by advocating for the inclusion of Markham's tech-innovation hub, VentureLabs, in the Southern Ontario Supercluster. In June 2019, Ng publicly announced Michael Chan as her re-election campaign co-chair, which led to questions of potential pro-Beijing influence in her campaign.

=== Cabinet Minister ===
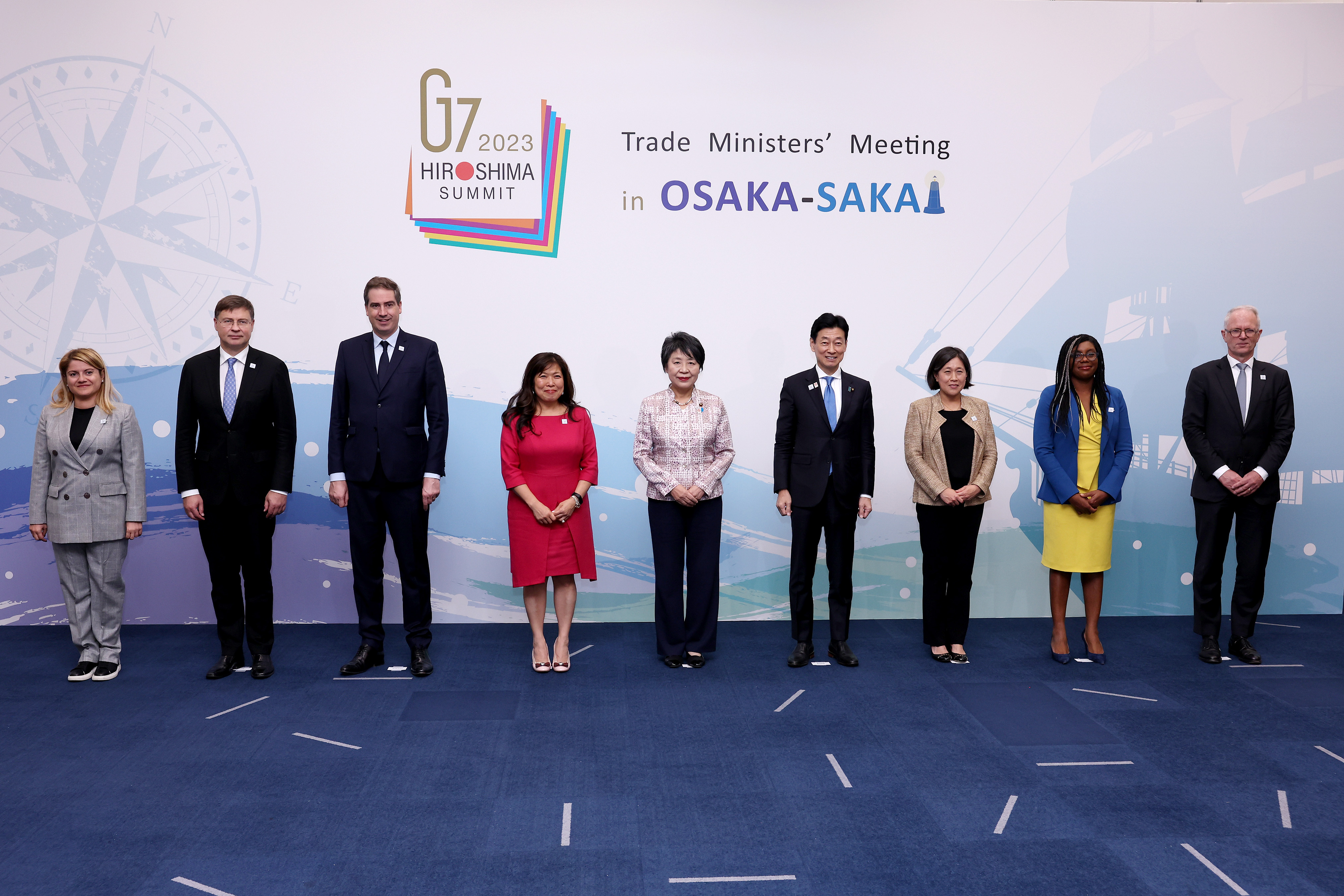
Ng at the 2023 G7 Trade Ministers' meeting in Osaka

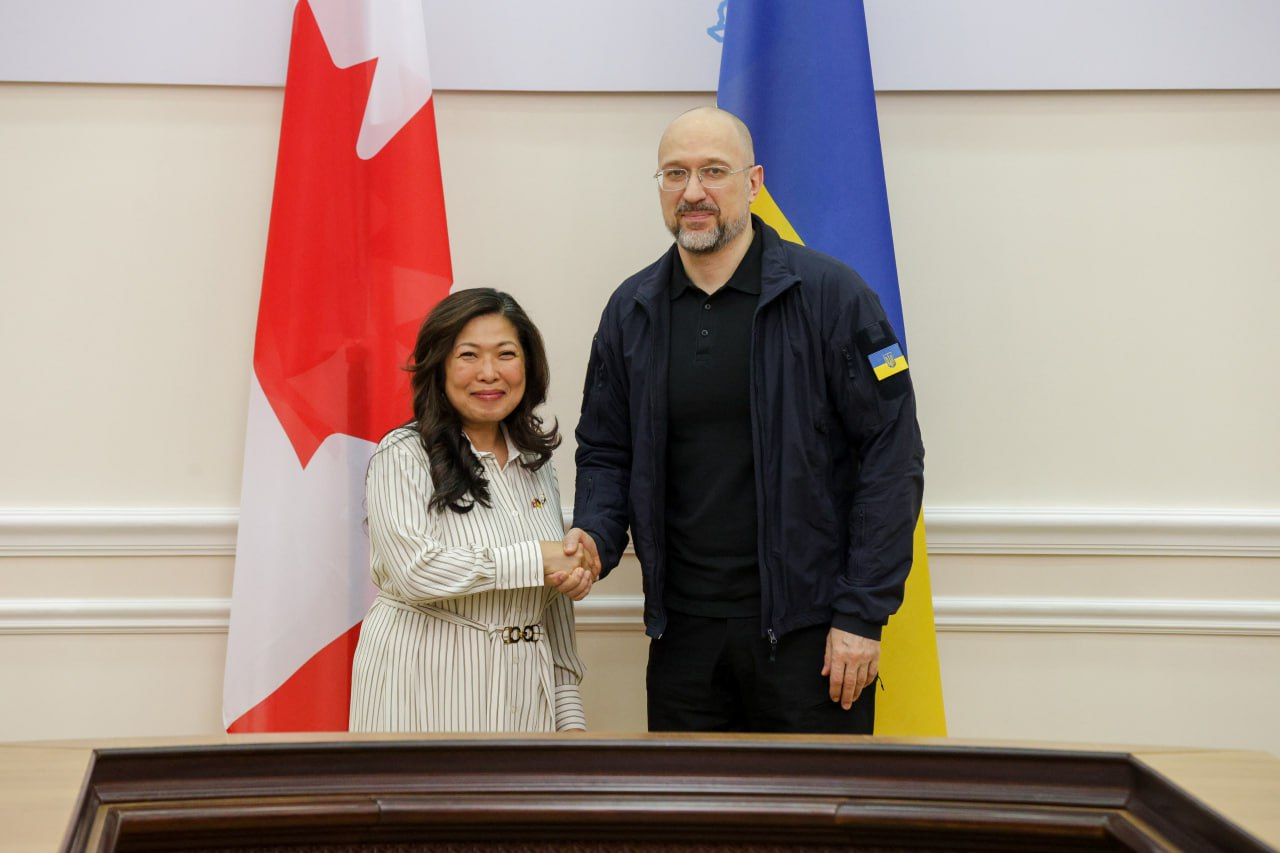
Ng with Denys Shmyhal in Ukraine in June 2024

Ng was appointed Minister of Small Business and Export Promotion in a cabinet shuffle in July 2018. Following her re-election as MP in the 2019 federal election, she was named Minister of Small Business, Export Promotion and International Trade, adding the trade portfolio to her responsibilities.

As Minister of Small Business and Export Promotion, Ng oversaw the development and implementation of several key support programs during the COVID-19 pandemic including: The Canada Emergency Business Account (CEBA) which provided interest-free loans of up to $60,000 to small businesses and non-profits, The Canada Emergency Commercial Rent Assistance (CECRA) to help small businesses with rent payments during Covid-19 lockdowns, and the Regional Relief and Recovery Fund (RRRF) to support businesses in rural communities.

Under Ng’s leadership, the Ministry of Small Business and Export Promotion created the Black Entrepreneurship Program, a $221 million investment to support Black business owners and entrepreneurs, and developed the Women Entrepreneurship Strategy (WES), a $6 billion investment to increase women-owned businesses' access to financing, talent, networks and expertise.

In 2020, Ng led Canada’s first-ever virtual trade mission to South Korea - an innovative approach to support Canadian businesses during the challenges of the COVID-19 pandemic. The mission focused on key sectors such as clean technology, information and communications technology, and health technology. It connected over 200 Canadian businesses with South Korean industry leaders and potential partners, facilitating commercial opportunities in one of Canada’s most significant trading partners in the Indo-Pacific region.

In November 2020, Ng led negotiations resulting in the Canada–United Kingdom Trade Continuity Agreement, ensuring continued preferential trade access between the two nations following Brexit.

After the 2021 election, Ng's responsibilities expanded to include Economic Development becoming the Minister of International Trade, Export Promotion, Small Business and Economic Development. She remained the minister responsible for Canada's trade negotiations, overseeing Export Development Canada and promoting small business.

In 2022, Mario Dion, the Ethics Commissioner of Canada, released a report finding that Ng had broken ethics rules in 2019 and 2020 by failing to recuse herself and awarding two government media training contracts – worth $16,950 and $5,840 – to the public relations firm "Pomp&Circumstance" that her friend of 20 years, Amanda Alvaro, co-founded. After the release of the report, Ng apologized and issued a statement saying that she should have recused herself.

In July 2023, Ng's appointment changed to Minister of Export Promotion, International Trade and Economic Development. In this role, Ng has led Canada's trade diversification strategy through trade agreements like the Comprehensive and Progressive Agreement for Trans-Pacific Partnership and Comprehensive Economic and Trade Agreement, strengthened trade relations with ASEAN nations and launched Canada's Indo-Pacific Strategy. She also oversaw the modernization of the Canada-Ukraine Free Trade Agreement.

Ng’s inaugural Team Canada Trade Mission to Japan in 2023 marked a pivotal step in Canada’s Indo-Pacific Strategy. The mission enabled Canadian businesses to establish connections and pursue commercial opportunities in Japan, one of Canada’s top trading partners.

In January 2024, Ng was appointed by Justin Trudeau to co-lead Team Canada engagement with Minister of Innovation, Science and Industry, François-Philippe Champagne, and Canadian ambassador to the United States, Kirsten Hillman. Team Canada was tasked with preparing Canada for all possible outcomes of the 2024 U.S. presidential election and to foster collaboration between businesses, entrepreneurs, labor organizations, civil society, and various levels of government to maintain strong Canada-U.S. relations.

Also in 2024, Ng conducted subsequent trade missions in Malaysia, Vietnam, the Republic of Korea, Indonesia, and the Philippines. The mission to Indonesia and the Philippines in December 2024 was Canada’s largest-ever trade mission, with over 300 representatives from more than 190 Canadian organizations participating. This mission facilitated significant engagements, including the conclusion of negotiations for the Canada-Indonesia Comprehensive Economic Partnership Agreement (CEPA) and the signing of multiple memorandums of understanding between Canadian and Indonesian companies.

In November 2024, Ng was named to the Cabinet Committee on Canada-U.S. Relations after Prime Minister, Justin Trudeau re-established the committee to focus on critical Canada-U.S. issues following the election of President Donald Trump for a second term.

In early 2025, Ng lead a delegation of approximately 220 Canadians from 140 organizations on a Team Canada Trade Mission to Australia. As a key initiative under Canada’s Indo-Pacific Strategy, this was Canada’s 5th Team Canada Trade Mission travelling to its 7th Indo-Pacific market since 2023. The trade mission provided participating Canadian exporters and innovators with an opportunity to make connections, further existing ones, and expand their reach into Australia’s diverse market and an important trade partner in the CPTPP.

After the trade mission to Australia, Ng visited Singapore and Brunei to strengthen Canada’s trade, investment and nuclear partnerships. Building on the Government of Canada’s 2024 announcement of the Canadian Trade Gateway for Nuclear Development to strengthen nuclear partnerships in the Indo-Pacific region, Ng participated in the third annual Canada-in-Asia Conference and the Canada-ASEAN Business Council’s Nuclear Energy Capacity Building Symposium, where she highlighted Canada’s efforts in helping Canadians working in the nuclear industry strengthen their partnerships in the Indo-Pacific region.

Amid escalating tariff concerns from the United States, Ng conducted diplomatic engagements in Geneva in February 2025, meeting with Director-General of the World Trade Organization Ngozi Okonjo-Iweala and European Commissioner for Trade Maros Sefcovic to reinforce Canada's trade partnerships and expand economic cooperation with European markets.

Ng also engaged in strategic communications targeting American consumers and businesses, highlighting how the $2.4 billion daily Canada-U.S. trade relationship supports millions of jobs and reduces costs for everyday products in both countries.

On February 10, 2025, Ng announced her intention to not seek re-election during the 2025 Canadian federal election.

In March 2025, Ng announced that Canada had formally requested WTO dispute consultations with the United States regarding the imposition by the United States of import duties on certain steel and aluminium products from Canada. This is the first step in both the dispute settlement processes of the WTO and the CUSMA.

Later that month, Ng also announced that Canada had requested WTO dispute consultations with China concerning Chinese measures that impose additional import duties on certain agricultural and fishery products from Canada.

== Electoral record ==
2021 Canadian federal election: Markham—Thornhill
Party	Candidate	Votes	%	±%	Expenditures
Liberal	Mary Ng	23,709	61.5	+7.6	$67,977.46
Conservative	Melissa Felian	10,136	26.3	-8.3	$57,520.72
New Democratic	Paul Sahbaz	3,222	8.4	+1.1	$633.62
Green	Mimi Lee	813	2.1	-0.7	$4,285.37
People's	Ilia Pashaev	648	1.7	+0.9	$1,203.75
Total valid votes/expense limit		38,528	–	–	$106,559.92
Total rejected ballots		398			
Turnout		38,926	55.70		
Eligible voters		69,883			
Source: Elections Canada

2019 Canadian federal election: Markham—Thornhill
Party	Candidate	Votes	%	±%	Expenditures
Liberal	Mary Ng	23,899	53.91	+2.55	$80,357.71
Conservative	Alex Yuan	15,319	34.56	-4.43	$74,064.17
New Democratic	Paul Sahbaz	3,233	7.29	+3.81	none listed
Green	Chris Williams	1,247	2.81	+0.60	none listed
People's	Peter Remedios	357	0.81		$0.00
Independent	Josephbai Macwan	276	0.62		none listed
Total valid votes/expense limit		44,331	100.0		
Total rejected ballots		448	1.00	+0.41	
Turnout		44,779	61.76	+31.14	
Eligible voters		72,499			
Liberal hold		Swing		+3.49	
Source: Elections Canada

Canadian federal by-election, April 3, 2017: Markham—Thornhill Resignation of John McCallum
Party	Candidate	Votes	%	±%
Liberal	Mary Ng	9,856	51.53	−4.19
Conservative	Ragavan Paranchothy	7,501	39.22	+6.91
New Democratic	Gregory Hines	671	3.51	−7.21
Progressive Canadian	Dorian Baxter	566	2.96	
Green	Caryn Bergmann	426	2.23	+0.98
Libertarian	Brendan Thomas Reilly	118	0.62	
Independent	Above Znoneofthe	77	0.40	
Total valid votes/expense limit		19,125	100.0	–
Total rejected ballots			-	
Turnout		27.51		
Eligible voters		69,838		
Liberal hold		Swing		−5.55

29th Canadian Ministry (2015–2025) – Cabinet of Justin Trudeau
Cabinet post (1)
Predecessor	Office	Successor
Bardish Chagger	Minister of Export Promotion, International Trade and Economic Development; July 17, 2018 – March 14, 2025	Dominic LeBlanc
