= 2017 Calgary Heritage federal by-election =

← 2015	April 3, 2017	2019 →

Riding of Calgary Heritage
- Registered: 81,270
- Turnout: 33.46% (▼21.57%)
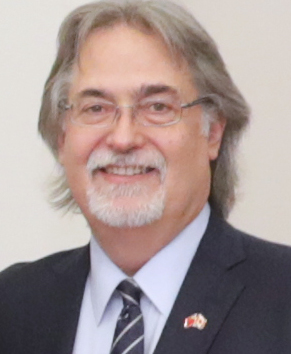
	First party	Second party
		LPC
Candidate	Bob Benzen	Scott Forsyth
Party	Conservative	Liberal
Popular vote	19,383	5,889
Percentage	71.47%	21.71%
Swing	▲7.70pp	▼4.26pp
MP before election
Stephen Harper
Conservative
Elected MP
Bob Benzen
Conservative

A by-election was held in the federal riding of Calgary Heritage in Alberta, Canada on 3 April 2017 following the resignation of Conservative MP and former Prime Minister of Canada Stephen Harper. The safe seat was held by the Conservative candidate Bob Benzen on an increased majority.

The by-election was scheduled to coincide with four others across the country, and was one of two to be held in the city of Calgary; Calgary Midnapore.

== Background ==
=== Constituency ===
Calgary Heritage covers the southwestern corner of Calgary.The electoral district was created for the 2015 federal election and has had Harper as its only MP; however, it is largely composed of the former riding of Calgary Southwest which was held by conservative parties throughout its existence.

== Campaign ==
The riding of Calgary Heritage became vacant when former Prime Minister of Canada Stephen Harper resigned his seat on August 26, 2016, to return to private life, including accepting directorships on corporate boards and establishing a consultancy firm.

The by-election was announced on February 22, 2017. The Speaker's warrant regarding the vacancy was received on August 29, 2016. The last day a by-election could have been announced was February 25, 2017, with an election held at least 36 days after being announced.

== Candidates ==
Bob Benzen, a small business owner and member of the Calgary Heritage Conservative Association defeated Rick Billington, a lawyer and the former president of the Calgary Heritage Conservative Association, and city prosecutor Paul Frank for the Conservative nomination, which was decided on October 23. Former Calgary Centre MP Joan Crockatt, party insider Alan Hallman, former Medicine Hat MP Monte Solberg, and Dan Williams, a former staffer to Calgary Midnapore MP Jason Kenney, all declined to run for the nomination despite speculation to the contrary. Ric McIver, leader of the Progressive Conservative Association of Alberta and MLA for Calgary-Hays, stated that he would not run.

Rumoured candidates for the Liberal nomination included physician Brendan Miles, the 2015 candidate in this riding, Chima Nkemdirim, the chief of staff to Calgary Mayor Naheed Nenshi, and former Conservative MP Lee Richardson. On February 8, 2017, the Liberal nomination was won by physician Scott Forsyth, defeating Steven Turner and Kanwar Gill.

Khalis Ahmed won the uncontested NDP nomination.

Taryn Knorren defeated Brennan Wauters for the Green Party of Canada nomination.

The Libertarian candidate was Darcy Gerow.

Businesswoman and former Dragons' Den star Arlene Dickinson was considered a potential candidate until she declined interest on January 22. Dickinson stated she had supported parts of both Conservative and Liberal platforms in the past, but considers herself non-partisan.

== Results ==
Canadian federal by-election, April 3, 2017: Calgary Heritage Resignation of Stephen Harper
Party	Candidate	Votes	%	±%
Conservative	Bob Benzen	19,383	71.47	+7.71
Liberal	Scott Forsyth	5,889	21.72	−4.25
New Democratic	Khalis Ahmed	785	2.89	−4.39
Green	Taryn Knorren	484	1.78	−0.35
Christian Heritage	Jeff Willerton	385	1.42	
Libertarian	Darcy Gerow	114	0.42	−0.00
National Advancement	Stephen J. Garvey	76	0.28	
Total valid votes/expense limit		27,116	99.71	–
Total rejected ballots		78	0.29	−0.10
Turnout		27,194	33.46	−39.16
Eligible voters		81,270		
Conservative hold		Swing		+5.98
Source: Elections Canada

== 2015 results ==
2015 Canadian federal election: Calgary Heritage
Party	Candidate	Votes	%	±%	Expenditures
Conservative	Stephen Harper	37,263	63.77	–10.61	$105,821.13
Liberal	Brendan Miles	15,172	25.97	+18.51	$46,125.76
New Democratic	Matt Masters	4,255	7.28	–4.84	$38,181.16
Green	Kelly Christie	1,246	2.13	–3.36	$7,044.83
Libertarian	Steven Paolasini	246	0.42	–	$170.00
Independent	Larry R. Heather	114	0.20	–	$16.50
Independent	Korry Zepik	73	0.12	–	$1,098.48
Independent	Nicolas Duchastel de Montrouge	61	0.10	–	$277.12
Total valid votes/expense limit		58,430	99.61		$215,236.37
Total rejected ballots		228	0.39	–	
Turnout		58,658	73.63	–	
Eligible voters		80,767			
Conservative hold		Swing		–14.56	
Source: Elections Canada

== See also ==
- 2023 Calgary Heritage federal by-election
