= Bob Benzen =

Canadian politician

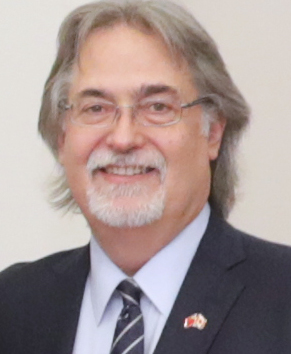

Member of Parliament for Calgary Heritage
- In office April 3, 2017 – December 31, 2022
- Preceded by: Stephen Harper
- Succeeded by: Shuvaloy Majumdar

Personal details
- Born: March 3, 1959 (age 67) Three Hills, Alberta, Canada
- Party: Conservative
- Spouse: Sue Benzen
- Children: 3
- Profession: Businessman

Bob Benzen (born March 3, 1959) is a Canadian politician who served as the member of Parliament (MP) for Calgary Heritage from 2017 to 2022. He was elected to the House of Commons of Canada in a by-election on April 3, 2017. He succeeded former Conservative Prime Minister Stephen Harper, who had resigned as an MP in 2016.

Prior to his election, Benzen was a businessman specializing in data storage and information management for energy companies.

Benzen was responsible for initiating Erin O'Toole's removal as Conservative leader in 2022, after he submitted a letter from 36 Conservative MPs calling for a leadership review.

== Politics ==
Benzen voted in support of Bill C-233, an act to amend the Criminal Code of Canada (sex-selective abortion), which would make it an indictable or summary offence for a medical practitioner to knowingly perform an abortion solely on the grounds of the child's genetic sex.

Benzen voted against a bill that would prohibit forcing children or adults to undergo conversion therapy aimed at altering their sexual orientation; however, the bill was ultimately passed and conversion therapy in Canada was banned.

On October 21, 2022, Benzen announced that he would retire from his role as MP on December 31, 2022. The by-election to replace him was held on July 24, 2023. He was succeeded by Shuvaloy Majumdar.

== Electoral record ==
2021 Canadian federal election: Calgary Heritage
Party	Candidate	Votes	%	±%	Expenditures
Conservative	Bob Benzen	30,870	57.66	–13.06	$67,437.01
New Democratic	Kathleen M. Johnson	9,320	17.41	+8.27	$1,119.48
Liberal	Scott Forsyth	8,960	16.73	+2.77	$8,531.08
People's	Bailey Bedard	2,682	5.01	+3.06	$2,115.28
Green	Malka Labell	766	1.43	–2.08	$21.70
Maverick	Annelise Freeman	714	1.33	–	$4,651.15
Rhinoceros	Mark Dejewski	230	0.43	–	none listed
Total valid votes/expense limit		53,542	99.42	–	$111,217.22
Total rejected ballots		313	0.58	+0.13	
Turnout		53,855	66.18	–4.47	
Eligible voters		81,375			
Conservative hold		Swing		-10.66	
Source: Elections Canada

2019 Canadian federal election: Calgary Heritage
Party	Candidate	Votes	%	±%	Expenditures
Conservative	Bob Benzen	40,817	70.72	–0.76	$75,391.36
Liberal	Scott Forsyth	8,057	13.96	–7.76	$4,785.78
New Democratic	Holly Heffernan	5,278	9.14	+6.25	$143.81
Green	Allie Tulick	2,027	3.51	+1.73	$919.83
People's	Stephanie Hoeppner	1,123	1.95	–	$4,376.81
Independent	Hunter Mills	228	0.40	–	none listed
Christian Heritage	Larry R. Heather	185	0.32	–1.10	$4,539.49
Total valid votes/expense limit		57,715	99.55	–	$108,766.26
Total rejected ballots		260	0.45	+0.16	
Turnout		57,975	70.65	+37.19	
Eligible voters		82,059			
Conservative hold		Swing		+3.50	
Source: Elections Canada

Canadian federal by-election, April 3, 2017: Calgary Heritage Resignation of Stephen Harper
Party	Candidate	Votes	%	±%	Expenditures
Conservative	Bob Benzen	19,383	71.48	+7.71	$105,821.01
Liberal	Scott Forsyth	5,889	21.72	–4.25	$52,539.03
New Democratic	Khalis Ahmed	785	2.89	–4.39	$1,292.92
Green	Taryn Knorren	484	1.78	–0.35	none listed
Christian Heritage	Jeff Willerton	385	1.42	–	$27,034.59
Libertarian	Darcy Gerow	114	0.42	+0.00	none listed
National Advancement	Stephen J. Garvey	76	0.28	–	$594.45
Total valid votes/expense limit		27,116	99.71	–	$113,917.11
Total rejected ballots		78	0.29	–0.10	
Turnout		27,194	33.46	–39.16	
Eligible voters		81,270			
Conservative hold		Swing		+5.98	
Source: Elections Canada
