= Calgary Heritage =

Federal electoral district in Alberta, Canada

Alberta electoral district
- Interactive map of riding boundaries from the 2025 federal election

Federal electoral district
- Legislature: House of Commons
MP
Shuvaloy Majumdar
Conservative
- District created: 2013
- First contested: 2015
- Last contested: 2025
- District webpage: profile, map

Demographics
- Population (2011): 108,320
- Electors (2019): 81,736
- Area (km²): 70
- Pop. density (per km²): 1,547.4
- Census division: Division No. 6
- Census subdivision: Calgary (part)

Calgary Heritage is a federal electoral district in Alberta, Canada, that has been represented in the House of Commons of Canada since 2015.

== History ==
Calgary Heritage was created by the 2012 federal electoral boundaries redistribution and was legally defined in the 2013 representation order. It came into effect upon the calling of the 2015 Canadian federal election, which was held that 19 October. It is essentially a reconfigured version of Calgary Southwest, the riding formerly represented by Stephen Harper, who served as the Prime Minister of Canada from 2006 to 2015. Territory from the former Calgary Southwest comprises 99% of the new riding, with territory from Calgary Southeast making up 1%.

While Calgary as a whole has long been considered heartland for the Conservative Party of Canada and its antecedents, Calgary Heritage is located in a particularly conservative area of Calgary. Its predecessor, Calgary Southwest, frequently gave Conservative candidates some of the highest margins in the nation. Had it existed under its current boundaries in 2011, Harper would have won over 74 percent of the vote.

While Harper was handily re-elected to this riding in 2015, his Conservatives lost their bid for a fresh mandate to the Liberals. Stephen Harper resigned as prime minister on November 4, 2015, shortly before the new prime minister Justin Trudeau was sworn in. Harper then resigned as MP for Calgary Heritage on August 26, 2016. A by-election to fill the seat was held on April 3, 2017; Bob Benzen retained it for the Conservatives and was subsequently re-elected in the nationwide elections of 2019 and 2021. Benzen retired as MP on December 31, 2022. The by-election, which was scheduled for July 24, 2023, was won by Shuvaloy Majumdar of the Conservative Party.

Following the 2022 Canadian federal electoral redistribution, this riding will lose the neighbourhood of Kingsland to Calgary Midnapore and gain the neighbourhoods of Millrise and Shawnessy from Calgary Midnapore. These changes will come into effect at the first election held after approximately April 2024.

== Geography ==
The riding is located in the southwestern corner of Calgary. It contains the neighbourhoods of Alpine Park, Bayview, Braeside, Bridlewood, Canyon Meadows, Cedarbrae, Chinook Park, Eagle Ridge, Evergreen, Haysboro, Kelvin Grove, Kingsland, Lakeview, North Glenmore Park (south of Glenmore Trail), Oakridge, Palliser, Pump Hill, Shawnee Slopes, Southwood, Woodbine and Woodlands.

As a safe Conservative seat, the Tories do well across the riding. However, their strongest neighbourhoods tend be in the southern part of the riding in neighbourhoods such as Shawnee Slopes and Evergreen, and in the Glenmore Reservoir area in neighbourhoods such as Bayview, Eagle Ridge (two of the wealthiest neighbourhoods in the city) and Pump Hill. The Conservatives are weaker in the northeastern corner of the riding in neighbourhoods like Kingsland, Southwood, and Haysboro.

== Demographics ==
According to the 2021 Canadian census

Ethnic groups: 66.9% White, 8.8% Filipino, 5.0% Chinese, 3.9% South Asian, 3.9% Black, 3.6% Indigenous, 2.3% Latin American, 1.4% Arab, Multiple 1.0%
Languages: 73.5% English, 4.3% Tagalog, 2.6% Mandarin, 2.2% Spanish, 1.8% Russian, 1.8% French
Religions: 51.1% Christian (22.8% Catholic, 3.9% United Church, 2.9% Anglican, 2.7% Christian Orthodox, 1.2% Lutheran, 1.2% Pentecostal, 16.5% Other Christian), 3.1% Muslim, 2.2% Jewish, 1.5% Hindu, 40.0% None.
Median income: $46,000 (2020)
Average income: $65,100 (2020)

Panethnic groups in Calgary Heritage (2011−2021)
Panethnic group	2021		2016		2011	
Panethnic group	Pop.	%	Pop.	%	Pop.	%
European (Note: Statistic includes all persons that did not make up part of a visible minority or an indigenous identity.)	72,405	66.9%	77,585	69.92%	81,100	75.88%
Southeast Asian (Note: Statistic includes total responses of "Filipino" and "Southeast Asian" under visible minority section on census.)	10,430	9.64%	9,070	8.17%	6,645	6.22%
East Asian (Note: Statistic includes total responses of "Chinese", "Korean", and "Japanese" under visible minority section on census.)	6,880	6.36%	7,515	6.77%	6,470	6.05%
South Asian	4,270	3.95%	4,275	3.85%	3,305	3.09%
African	4,170	3.85%	3,105	2.8%	2,215	2.07%
Indigenous	3,920	3.62%	3,190	2.87%	2,610	2.44%
Latin American	2,490	2.3%	2,690	2.42%	2,320	2.17%
Middle Eastern (Note: Statistic includes total responses of "West Asian" and "Arab" under visible minority section on census.)	2,350	2.17%	2,380	2.14%	1,410	1.32%
Other/Multiracial (Note: Statistic includes total responses of "Visible minority, n.i.e." and "Multiple visible minorities" under visible minority section on census.)	1,310	1.21%	1,170	1.05%	815	0.76%
Total responses	108,225	99.16%	110,965	99%	106,885	98.68%
Total population	109,141	100%	112,087	100%	108,320	100%
Notes: Totals greater than 100% due to multiple origin responses. Demographics based on 2012 Canadian federal electoral redistribution riding boundaries.

== Members of Parliament ==
This riding has elected the following members of the House of Commons of Canada:

Parliament	Years	Member	Party
Calgary Heritage; Riding created from Calgary Southeast and Calgary Southwest
42nd	2015–2016	Stephen Harper	Conservative
42nd	2017–2019	Bob Benzen	Conservative
43rd	2019–2021	Bob Benzen	Conservative
44th	2021–2022	Bob Benzen	Conservative
44th	2023–2025	Shuvaloy Majumdar	Conservative
45th	2025–present	Shuvaloy Majumdar	Conservative

== Election results ==
View source data.
Graph of election results in Calgary Heritage (minor parties that never got 2% of the vote or didn't run consistently are omitted)

=== 2023 representation order ===
2025 Canadian federal election
Party	Candidate	Votes	%	±%	Expenditures
Conservative	Shuvaloy Majumdar	42,088	61.45	+3.13	$103,932.81
Liberal	Scott Arnott	23,673	34.56	+18.37	$37,536.87
New Democratic	Becki Zimmerman	1,691	2.47	–14.81	$387.96
Green	Ravenmoon Crocker	493	0.72	–0.70	none listed
Independent	Chris Galas	280	0.41	–	$4,398.31
Christian Heritage	Larry R. Heather	268	0.39	–	$1,277.09
Total valid votes/expense limit		68,493	99.46	–	$138,223.89
Total rejected ballots		372	0.54	+0.30	
Turnout		68,865	73.64	+44.75	
Eligible voters		93,515			
Conservative notional hold		Swing		–7.62	
Note: Change in percentage value and swing are calculated from the redistributed results of the 2021 general election, not the July 2023 by-election.
Source: Elections Canada

2021 federal election redistributed results
Party	Vote	%
Conservative	34,334	58.32
New Democratic	10,172	17.28
Liberal	9,531	16.19
People's	3,009	5.11
Green	838	1.42
Others	983	1.67

=== 2013 representation order ===
Canadian federal by-election, July 24, 2023 Resignation of Bob Benzen
Party	Candidate	Votes	%	±%	Expenditures
Conservative	Shuvaloy Majumdar	15,853	65.63	+7.97	$116,908.12
Liberal	Elliot Weinstein	3,465	14.34	–2.39	$72,324.59
New Democratic	Gurmit Bhachu	3,429	14.20	–3.21	$10,675.70
People's	Kelly Lorencz	656	2.72	–2.29	none listed
Green	Ravenmoon Crocker	407	1.68	+0.25	$2,523.51
Christian Heritage	Larry R. Heather	144	0.60	–	$4,107.07
Maverick	Dan Irving	131	0.54	–0.79	$12,547.04
No Affiliation	Donovan Eckstrom	71	0.29	–	none listed
Total valid votes/expense limit		24,156	99.76	–	$125,117.21
Total rejected ballots		57	0.24	–0.35	
Turnout		24,213	28.89	–37.29	
Eligible voters		83,799			
Conservative hold		Swing		+2.79	
Source: Elections Canada

2021 Canadian federal election
Party	Candidate	Votes	%	±%	Expenditures
Conservative	Bob Benzen	30,870	57.66	–13.06	$67,437.01
New Democratic	Kathleen M. Johnson	9,320	17.41	+8.27	$1,119.48
Liberal	Scott Forsyth	8,960	16.73	+2.77	$8,531.08
People's	Bailey Bedard	2,682	5.01	+3.06	$2,115.28
Green	Malka Labell	766	1.43	–2.08	$21.70
Maverick	Annelise Freeman	714	1.33	–	$4,651.15
Rhinoceros	Mark Dejewski	230	0.43	–	none listed
Total valid votes/expense limit		53,542	99.42	–	$111,217.22
Total rejected ballots		313	0.58	+0.13	
Turnout		53,855	66.18	–4.47	
Eligible voters		81,375			
Conservative hold		Swing		-10.66	
Source: Elections Canada

2019 Canadian federal election
Party	Candidate	Votes	%	±%	Expenditures
Conservative	Bob Benzen	40,817	70.72	–0.76	$75,391.36
Liberal	Scott Forsyth	8,057	13.96	–7.76	$4,785.78
New Democratic	Holly Heffernan	5,278	9.14	+6.25	$143.81
Green	Allie Tulick	2,027	3.51	+1.73	$919.83
People's	Stephanie Hoeppner	1,123	1.95	–	$4,376.81
Independent	Hunter Mills	228	0.40	–	none listed
Christian Heritage	Larry R. Heather	185	0.32	–1.10	$4,539.49
Total valid votes/expense limit		57,715	99.55	–	$108,766.26
Total rejected ballots		260	0.45	+0.16	
Turnout		57,975	70.65	+37.19	
Eligible voters		82,059			
Conservative hold		Swing		+3.50	
Source: Elections Canada

Canadian federal by-election, April 3, 2017 Resignation of Stephen Harper
Party	Candidate	Votes	%	±%	Expenditures
Conservative	Bob Benzen	19,383	71.48	+7.71	$105,821.01
Liberal	Scott Forsyth	5,889	21.72	–4.25	$52,539.03
New Democratic	Khalis Ahmed	785	2.89	–4.39	$1,292.92
Green	Taryn Knorren	484	1.78	–0.35	none listed
Christian Heritage	Jeff Willerton	385	1.42	–	$27,034.59
Libertarian	Darcy Gerow	114	0.42	+0.00	none listed
National Advancement	Stephen J. Garvey	76	0.28	–	$594.45
Total valid votes/expense limit		27,116	99.71	–	$113,917.11
Total rejected ballots		78	0.29	–0.10	
Turnout		27,194	33.46	–39.16	
Eligible voters		81,270			
Conservative hold		Swing		+5.98	
Source: Elections Canada

2015 Canadian federal election
Party	Candidate	Votes	%	±%	Expenditures
Conservative	Stephen Harper	37,263	63.77	–10.61	$105,821.13
Liberal	Brendan Miles	15,172	25.97	+18.51	$46,125.76
New Democratic	Matt Masters Burgener	4,255	7.28	–4.84	$38,164.05
Green	Kelly Christie	1,246	2.13	–3.36	$7,044.83
Libertarian	Steven Paolasini	246	0.42	–	none listed
Independent	Larry R. Heather	114	0.20	–	$16.50
Independent	Korry Zepik	73	0.12	–	$1,098.48
Independent	Nicolas Duchastel de Montrouge	61	0.10	–	$277.12
Total valid votes/expense limit		58,430	99.61	–	$215,236.37
Total rejected ballots		228	0.39	–	
Turnout		58,658	72.63	–	
Eligible voters		80,767			
Conservative hold		Swing		–14.56	
Source: Library of Parliament

2011 federal election redistributed results
Party	Vote	%
Conservative	34,761	74.38
New Democratic	5,663	12.12
Liberal	3,485	7.46
Green	2,568	5.50
Others	255	0.55

== See also ==
- List of Canadian electoral districts
- Historical federal electoral districts of Canada
