= Stephanie Kusie =

Canadian politician (born 1973)

Stephanie Kusie MP
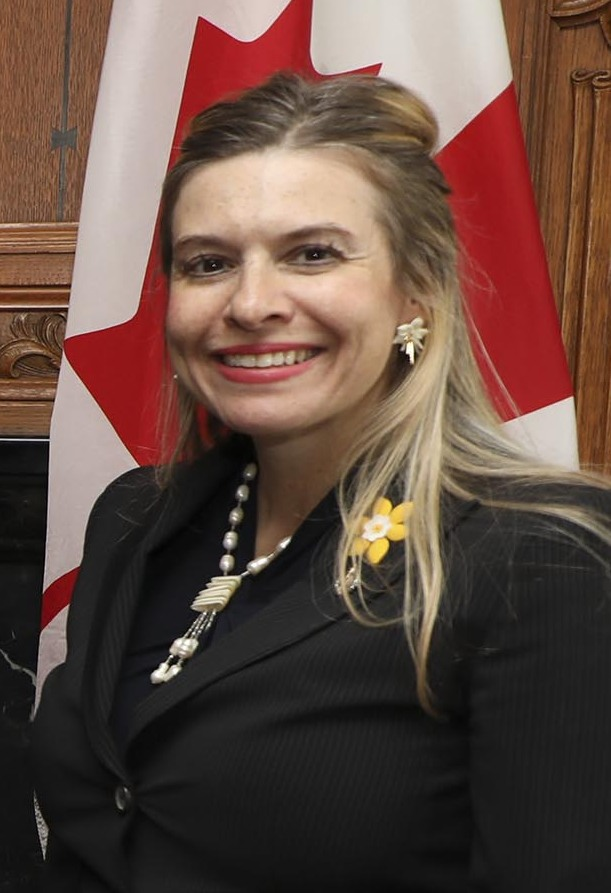

Member of Parliament for Calgary Midnapore
- Incumbent
- Assumed office April 3, 2017
- Preceded by: Jason Kenney
- Succeeded by
Shadow Minister
2026–present	International Trade
2022–2026	Treasury Board
2021–2022	Employment, Workforce Development and Disability Inclusion
2020–2021	Transport
2019–2020	Families, Children and Social Development
2018–2019	Democratic Institutions

Personal details
- Born: 1972 or 1973 (age 52–53) Calgary, Alberta, Canada
- Party: Conservative
- Spouse: James Kusie
- Children: Edward Kusie
- Education: University of Calgary (B.A. Political Science); Rutgers University (M.B.A.)
- Profession: Member of Parliament

Stephanie L. Kusie MP (born 1973) is a Canadian politician and former diplomat who was first elected to the House of Commons of Canada in a by-election on April 3, 2017. She represents the electoral district of Calgary Midnapore in Alberta as a member of the Conservative Party of Canada and serves as Shadow Minister of Treasury Board in the Official Opposition Shadow Cabinet of the 44th Parliament of Canada.

== Personal life ==
Kusie received a B.A. in political science from the University of Calgary and an M.B.A. from Rutgers University. She was chargé d'affaires ad interim for Canada to El Salvador and consul for Canada to Dallas, Texas. She served as a senior policy advisor to Peter Kent on Latin America. Her responsibilities included negotiating free trade deals, work related to the Keystone Pipeline project, and lobbying the United Nations to place Canada on the Security Council. She married her spouse James Kusie on August 18, 2006.

== Political career ==
Kusie ran for Calgary City Council in 2013 but did not win a seat. After the election, she worked on Preston Manning's Municipal Governance Project.

The Conservative Party nominated Kusie for the 2017 Calgary Midnapore by-election; she succeeded former cabinet minister Jason Kenney, who had resigned as Calgary Midnapore's Conservative MP in 2016.

After being elected in 2017, Kusie was appointed as the Official Opposition Deputy Shadow Minister for Health. In September 2018, she took over the position of Official Opposition Shadow Minister for Democratic Institutions and became a vice-chair of the Standing Committee of Procedure and House Affairs In the same year, she accepted invitations to become a member of both the Trilateral Commission and CANZUK. She was most recently elected to the executive committee of the Canadian Section of ParlAmericas Interparliamentary Association.

Following the fall 2019 general election, Kusie served as the Shadow Minister for Families, Children, and Social Development, a role she held until September 2020, when incoming Conservative Party Leader, Erin O’Toole, appointed her as the Shadow Minister of Transport in his new Shadow Cabinet.

Kusie was re-elected in the 2021 federal election. Following the 2022 Conservative Party of Canada leadership election, Pierre Poilievre appointed a new Shadow Cabinet in October 2022 with Kusie in Treasury Board. In June 2026, Kusie was named as Shadow Minister of International Trade.

== Electoral record ==
=== Federal ===
2025 Canadian federal election: Calgary Midnapore
Party	Candidate	Votes	%	±%	Expenditures
Conservative	Stephanie Kusie	48,131	65.54	+5.27	$58,029.72
Liberal	Sunjiv Raval	21,979	29.93	+17.47	$11,987.65
New Democratic	Austin Mullins	2,271	3.09	–15.45	$39.88
People's	Colin Kindret	556	0.76	–5.33	none listed
Green	Adam Delgado	495	0.67	–0.67	none listed
Total valid votes/expense limit		73,432	99.46	–	$144,110.56
Total rejected ballots		397	0.54	–0.01	
Turnout		73,829	73.53	+5.80	
Eligible voters		100,409			
Conservative notional hold		Swing		+11.37	
Source: Library of Parliament

2021 Canadian federal election: Calgary Midnapore
Party	Candidate	Votes	%	±%	Expenditures
Conservative	Stephanie Kusie	39,147	60.66	–13.60	$54,752.91
New Democratic	Gurmit Bhachu	11,826	18.33	+8.86	$5,943.54
Liberal	Zarnab Zafar	7,947	12.32	+1.29	$2,023.58
People's	Jonathan Hagel	3,930	6.09	+3.76	$4,392.73
Green	Shaun T. Pulsifer	868	1.35	–1.58	none listed
Maverick	Matt Magolan	812	1.26	–	none listed
Total valid votes/expense limit		64,530	99.45	–	$122,871.55
Total rejected ballots		355	0.55	+0.05	
Turnout		64,885	67.73	–4.87	
Eligible voters		95,798			
Conservative hold		Swing		–7.94	
Source: Elections Canada

2019 Canadian federal election: Calgary Midnapore
Party	Candidate	Votes	%	±%	Expenditures
Conservative	Stephanie Kusie	50,559	74.26	–2.99	$56,726.44
Liberal	Brian Aalto	7,507	11.03	–6.00	$1,875.42
New Democratic	Gurmit Bhachu	6,445	9.47	+6.94	$2,059.00
Green	Taylor Stasila	1,992	2.93	+0.85	none listed
People's	Edward Gao	1,585	2.33	–	$8,767.66
Total valid votes/expense limit		68,088	99.51	–	$118,102.61
Total rejected ballots		338	0.49	+0.27	
Turnout		68,426	72.60	+40.14	
Eligible voters		94,245			
Conservative hold		Swing		+1.57	
Source: Elections Canada

Canadian federal by-election, April 3, 2017: Calgary Midnapore Resignation of Jason Kenney
Party	Candidate	Votes	%	±%	Expenditures
Conservative	Stephanie Kusie	22,454	77.25	+10.52	$115,744.15
Liberal	Haley Brown	4,950	17.03	–5.62	$50,686.42
New Democratic	Holly Heffernan	735	2.53	–5.20	$1,338.85
Green	Ryan Zedic	605	2.08	–0.58	$2,056.40
Christian Heritage	Larry R. Heather	251	0.86	–	$8,591.53
National Advancement	Kulbir Singh Chawla	73	0.25	–	$1,307.66
Total valid votes/expense limit		29,068	99.77	–	$120,973.76
Total rejected ballots		66	0.23	–0.05	
Turnout		29,134	32.46	–40.10	
Eligible voters		89,748			
Conservative hold		Swing		+8.08	
Source: Elections Canada

=== Municipal ===
Calgary Ward 12
Candidate	Votes	%
Shane A. Keating	11,942	71.5
Stephanie Kusie	4,766	28.5
