= Markham—Thornhill (federal electoral district) =

Federal electoral district in Ontario, Canada

Coordinates: 43.835°N 79.313°W

Ontario electoral district
- Interactive map of riding boundaries from the 2025 federal election

Federal electoral district
- Legislature: House of Commons
MP
Tim Hodgson
Liberal
- District created: 2013
- First contested: 2015
- Last contested: 2025
- District webpage: profile, map

Demographics
- Population (2021): 97,510
- Electors (2015): 70,211
- Area (km²): 44
- Pop. density (per km²): 2,216.1
- Census division: York
- Census subdivision: Markham (part)

Markham—Thornhill is a federal electoral district in Ontario, Canada, that has been represented in the House of Commons of Canada since 2015.

== Demographics ==
Markham—Thornhill loses more people than any other federal electoral district in the 905 region. The population in 2016 was 99,078 which is a 3.1% drop from 102,221 in 2011.

According to the 2021 Canadian census

Ethnic groups: 42.8% Chinese, 27.5% South Asian, 12.7% White, 3.8% Black, 2.7% Filipino, 3.0% West Asian, 1.3% Korean
Languages: 29.5% English, 18.7% Cantonese, 13.8% Mandarin, 7.6% Tamil, 3.1% Urdu, 2.3% Punjabi, 2.0% Persian, 1.9% Gujarati, 1.3% Tagalog, 1.0% Korean
Religions: 28.2% Christian (13.5% Catholic, 2.4% Christian Orthodox, 1.0% Anglican, 11.3% other), 14.3% Hindu, 10.8% Muslim, 4.7% Buddhist, 3.1% Jewish, 2.2% Sikh, 36.1% none
Median income: $32,400 (2020)
Average income: $47,640 (2020)

== History ==
Markham—Thornhill was created by 2012 federal electoral boundaries redistribution out of parts of Markham—Unionville and Thornhill. It was legally defined in the 2013 representation order, and came into effect upon the dropping of the writs for the 2015 federal election.

Following the 2022 Canadian federal electoral redistribution, it gained all of Markham—Stouffville south of the 407.

== Members of Parliament ==
This riding has elected the following members of Parliament:

Parliament	Years	Member	Party
Markham—Thornhill; Riding created from Markham—Unionville and Thornhill
42nd	2015–2017	John McCallum	Liberal
42nd	2017–2019	Mary Ng	Liberal
43rd	2019–2021	Mary Ng	Liberal
44th	2021–2025	Mary Ng	Liberal
45th	2025–present	Tim Hodgson	Liberal

== Election results ==
View source data.
Graph of general election results in Markham—Thornhill (minor parties that never got 2% of the vote or didn't run consistently are omitted)

2025 Canadian federal election
Party	Candidate	Votes	%	±%	Expenditures
Liberal	Tim Hodgson	27,504	54.54	–7.00	
Conservative	Lionel Loganathan	21,003	41.65	+15.27	
New Democratic	Aftab Qureshi	1,022	2.03	–6.33	
People's	Mimi Lee	747	1.48	–0.24	
Centrist	Haider Qureshi	153	0.30	N/A	
Total valid votes/expense limit					
Total rejected ballots					
Turnout		50,429	63.77		
Eligible voters		79,081			
Liberal notional hold		Swing		–11.14	
Source: Elections Canada

2021 federal election redistributed results
Party	Vote	%
Liberal	27,193	61.54
Conservative	11,659	26.38
New Democratic	3,693	8.36
Green	883	2.00
People's	762	1.72

2021 Canadian federal election
Party	Candidate	Votes	%	±%	Expenditures
Liberal	Mary Ng	23,709	61.5	+7.6	$67,977.46
Conservative	Melissa Felian	10,136	26.3	-8.3	$57,520.72
New Democratic	Paul Sahbaz	3,222	8.4	+1.1	$633.62
Green	Mimi Lee	813	2.1	-0.7	$4,285.37
People's	Ilia Pashaev	648	1.7	+0.9	$1,203.75
Total valid votes/expense limit		38,528	–	–	$106,559.92
Total rejected ballots		398			
Turnout		38,926	55.70		
Eligible voters		69,883			
Source: Elections Canada

2019 Canadian federal election
Party	Candidate	Votes	%	±%	Expenditures
Liberal	Mary Ng	23,899	53.91	+2.55	$80,357.71
Conservative	Alex Yuan	15,319	34.56	-4.43	$74,064.17
New Democratic	Paul Sahbaz	3,233	7.29	+3.81	none listed
Green	Chris Williams	1,247	2.81	+0.60	none listed
People's	Peter Remedios	357	0.81		$0.00
Independent	Josephbai Macwan	276	0.62		none listed
Total valid votes/expense limit		44,331	100.0		
Total rejected ballots		448	1.00	+0.41	
Turnout		44,779	61.76	+31.14	
Eligible voters		72,499			
Liberal hold		Swing		+3.49	
Source: Elections Canada

=== 2017 by-election ===
A by-election was held on April 3, 2017, following John McCallum's appointment as ambassador to China on January 10, 2017.

Canadian federal by-election, April 3, 2017 Resignation of John McCallum
Party	Candidate	Votes	%	±%
Liberal	Mary Ng	9,856	51.53	−4.19
Conservative	Ragavan Paranchothy	7,501	39.22	+6.91
New Democratic	Gregory Hines	671	3.51	−7.21
Progressive Canadian	Dorian Baxter	566	2.96	
Green	Caryn Bergmann	426	2.23	+0.98
Libertarian	Brendan Thomas Reilly	118	0.62	
Independent	Above Znoneofthe	77	0.40	
Total valid votes/expense limit		19,125	100.0	–
Total rejected ballots			-	
Turnout		27.51		
Eligible voters		69,838		
Liberal hold		Swing		−5.55

2015 Canadian federal election
Party	Candidate	Votes	%	±%	Expenditures
Liberal	John McCallum	23,878	55.72	+18.61	$78,406.90
Conservative	Jobson Easow	13,849	32.31	-4.08	$128,323.59
New Democratic	Senthi Chelliah	4,595	10.72	-12.67	$48,598.52
Green	Joshua Russell	535	1.25	-1.37	–
Total valid votes/expense limit		42,857	100.00		$203,953.81
Total rejected ballots		240	0.56	–	
Turnout		43,097	61.14	–	
Eligible voters		70,484			
Liberal notional hold		Swing		+11.34	
Source: Elections Canada

2011 federal election redistributed results
Party	Vote	%
Liberal	14,128	37.11
Conservative	13,856	36.39
New Democratic	8,907	23.39
Green	998	2.62
Others	186	0.49

== See also ==
- List of Canadian electoral districts
- Historical federal electoral districts of Canada
- Markham—Thornhill (provincial electoral district)
