= Calgary Midnapore =

Federal electoral district in Alberta, Canada

Alberta electoral district
- Interactive map of riding boundaries from the 2025 federal election

Federal electoral district
- Legislature: House of Commons
MP
Stephanie Kusie
Conservative
- District created: 2013
- First contested: 2015
- Last contested: 2025
- District webpage: profile, map

Demographics
- Population (2011): 111,227
- Electors (2019): 93,458
- Area (km²): 87
- Pop. density (per km²): 1,278.5
- Census division: Division No. 6
- Census subdivision: Calgary (part)

Calgary Midnapore is a federal electoral district in Alberta, Canada, that has been represented in the House of Commons of Canada since 2015. It has been represented by Stephanie Kusie since she won the 2017 by-election.

Calgary Midnapore was created by the 2012 federal electoral boundaries redistribution and was legally defined in the 2013 representation order. It came into effect upon the call of the 42nd Canadian federal election, which was held in October 2015. It was created mostly out of the former seat of Calgary Southeast, with smaller portions coming from Calgary Southwest and Macleod. It is named for the Midnapore neighbourhood.

While Calgary has long tilted rightward, Calgary Midnapore is located in a particularly conservative area of Calgary. Counting its time as Calgary Southeast, it has always been held by a member of the major right-wing party of the day, often by large margins. After neighbouring Calgary Heritage (the former Calgary Southwest), it is the second-safest Conservative riding in Calgary.

== Boundaries ==
Consisting of that part of the City of Calgary described as follows: commencing at the intersection of Macleod Trail S with Glenmore Trail SE (Highway No. 8); thence generally easterly along Glenmore Trail SE (Highway No. 8) to the left bank of the Bow River; thence generally southerly along said bank, including all islands adjacent to the river bank, to the southerly limit of said city; thence southerly, westerly and generally northwesterly along the southerly and westerly limits of said city to Spruce Meadows Way SW; thence northerly along said way and northerly and easterly along James McKevitt Road SW to Macleod Trail S; thence generally northerly along said trail to the point of commencement.

== Demographics ==
In 2013, a total of 111,227 persons lived in the riding's boundaries. Of these, 86,000 spoke English as their "mother tongue" and 1,650 claimed French as their native language. Of the more than 20,000 who spoke English as a second language, or not at all, the next largest group was the over 2,600 who spoke Tagalog (Filipino). The number of residents who spoke English as their first official Canadian language was 107,320, and 1,580 spoke French as their primary official language.

Panethnic groups in Calgary Midnapore (2011−2021)
Panethnic group	2021		2016		2011	
Panethnic group	Pop.	%	Pop.	%	Pop.	%
European (Note: Statistic includes all persons that did not make up part of a visible minority or an indigenous identity.)	88,255	69.24%	89,705	74.8%	87,600	79.76%
Southeast Asian (Note: Statistic includes total responses of "Filipino" and "Southeast Asian" under visible minority section on census.)	11,115	8.72%	7,830	6.53%	5,735	5.22%
East Asian (Note: Statistic includes total responses of "Chinese", "Korean", and "Japanese" under visible minority section on census.)	6,300	4.94%	6,070	5.06%	5,525	5.03%
South Asian	5,880	4.61%	4,710	3.93%	3,090	2.81%
African	4,445	3.49%	2,710	2.26%	1,685	1.53%
Indigenous	4,225	3.31%	3,445	2.87%	2,705	2.46%
Latin American	3,610	2.83%	2,470	2.06%	1,785	1.63%
Middle Eastern (Note: Statistic includes total responses of "West Asian" and "Arab" under visible minority section on census.)	2,300	1.8%	1,730	1.44%	930	0.85%
Other/Multiracial (Note: Statistic includes total responses of "Visible minority, n.i.e." and "Multiple visible minorities" under visible minority section on census.)	1,340	1.05%	1,250	1.04%	785	0.71%
Total responses	127,470	98.73%	119,920	98.42%	109,835	98.75%
Total population	129,110	100%	121,844	100%	111,227	100%
Notes: Totals greater than 100% due to multiple origin responses. Demographics based on 2012 Canadian federal electoral redistribution riding boundaries.

== Members of Parliament ==
This riding has elected the following members of the House of Commons of Canada:

Calgary Midnapore
Parliament	Years	Member	Party
Riding created from Calgary Southeast, Calgary Southwest and Macleod
42nd	2015–2016	Jason Kenney	Conservative
42nd	2017–2019	Stephanie Kusie	Conservative
43rd	2019–2021	Stephanie Kusie	Conservative
44th	2021–2025	Stephanie Kusie	Conservative
45th	2025–present	Stephanie Kusie	Conservative

== Election results ==
View source data.
Graph of election results in Calgary Midnapore (minor parties that never got 2% of the vote or didn't run consistently are omitted)

=== 2023 representation order ===
2025 Canadian federal election
Party	Candidate	Votes	%	±%	Expenditures
Conservative	Stephanie Kusie	48,131	65.54	+5.27	$58,029.72
Liberal	Sunjiv Raval	21,979	29.93	+17.47	$11,987.65
New Democratic	Austin Mullins	2,271	3.09	–15.45	$39.88
People's	Colin Kindret	556	0.76	–5.33	none listed
Green	Adam Delgado	495	0.67	–0.67	none listed
Total valid votes/expense limit		73,432	99.46	–	$144,110.56
Total rejected ballots		397	0.54	–0.01	
Turnout		73,829	73.53	+5.80	
Eligible voters		100,409			
Conservative notional hold		Swing		+11.37	
Source: Library of Parliament

2021 federal election redistributed results
Party	Vote	%
Conservative	35,683	60.27
New Democratic	10,974	18.54
Liberal	7,376	12.46
People's	3,603	6.09
Green	796	1.34
Others	773	1.31

=== 2013 representation order ===
2021 Canadian federal election
Party	Candidate	Votes	%	±%	Expenditures
Conservative	Stephanie Kusie	39,147	60.66	–13.60	$54,752.91
New Democratic	Gurmit Bhachu	11,826	18.33	+8.86	$5,943.54
Liberal	Zarnab Zafar	7,947	12.32	+1.29	$2,023.58
People's	Jonathan Hagel	3,930	6.09	+3.76	$4,392.73
Green	Shaun T. Pulsifer	868	1.35	–1.58	none listed
Maverick	Matt Magolan	812	1.26	–	none listed
Total valid votes/expense limit		64,530	99.45	–	$122,871.55
Total rejected ballots		355	0.55	+0.05	
Turnout		64,885	67.73	–4.87	
Eligible voters		95,798			
Conservative hold		Swing		–7.94	
Source: Elections Canada

2019 Canadian federal election
Party	Candidate	Votes	%	±%	Expenditures
Conservative	Stephanie Kusie	50,559	74.26	–2.99	$56,726.44
Liberal	Brian Aalto	7,507	11.03	–6.00	$1,875.42
New Democratic	Gurmit Bhachu	6,445	9.47	+6.94	$2,059.00
Green	Taylor Stasila	1,992	2.93	+0.85	none listed
People's	Edward Gao	1,585	2.33	–	$8,767.66
Total valid votes/expense limit		68,088	99.51	–	$118,102.61
Total rejected ballots		338	0.49	+0.27	
Turnout		68,426	72.60	+40.14	
Eligible voters		94,245			
Conservative hold		Swing		+1.57	
Source: Elections Canada

Canadian federal by-election, April 3, 2017 Resignation of Jason Kenney
Party	Candidate	Votes	%	±%	Expenditures
Conservative	Stephanie Kusie	22,454	77.25	+10.52	$115,744.15
Liberal	Haley Brown	4,950	17.03	–5.62	$50,686.42
New Democratic	Holly Heffernan	735	2.53	–5.20	$1,338.85
Green	Ryan Zedic	605	2.08	–0.58	$2,056.40
Christian Heritage	Larry R. Heather	251	0.86	–	$8,591.53
National Advancement	Kulbir Singh Chawla	73	0.25	–	$1,307.66
Total valid votes/expense limit		29,068	99.77	–	$120,973.76
Total rejected ballots		66	0.23	–0.05	
Turnout		29,134	32.46	–40.10	
Eligible voters		89,748			
Conservative hold		Swing		+8.08	
Source: Elections Canada

2015 Canadian federal election
Party	Candidate	Votes	%	±%	Expenditures
Conservative	Jason Kenney	42,415	66.73	–9.17	$67,515.08
Liberal	Haley Brown	14,396	22.65	+16.24	$11,213.46
New Democratic	Laura Weston	4,915	7.73	–2.82	$18,349.56
Green	Brennan Wauters	1,691	2.66	–3.77	$4,824.13
Marxist–Leninist	Margaret Peggy Askin	145	0.23	–	none listed
Total valid votes/expense limit		63,562	99.72	–	$226,378.17
Total rejected ballots		179	0.28	–	
Turnout		63,741	72.56	–	
Eligible voters		87,848			
Conservative hold		Swing		–12.71	
Source: Library of Parliament

2011 federal election redistributed results
Party	Vote	%
Conservative	37,022	75.90
New Democratic	5,145	10.55
Green	3,138	6.43
Liberal	3,125	6.41
Others	346	0.71

== See also ==
- List of Canadian electoral districts
- Historical federal electoral districts of Canada
