= 2017 Calgary Midnapore federal by-election =

- April 3, 2017

Riding of Calgary Midnapore
- Registered: 89,436
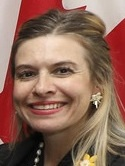
	First party	Second party
		LPC
Candidate	Stephanie Kusie	Haley Brown
Party	Conservative	Liberal
Popular vote	22,454	4,950
Percentage	77.17%	17.01%
Swing	▲10.44%	▼5.64%
MP before election
Jason Kenney
Conservative
Elected MP
Stephanie Kusie
Conservative

A by-election was held in the federal riding of Calgary Midnapore in Alberta, Canada on 3 April 2017 following the resignation of Conservative MP and former Minister of National Defence Jason Kenney. The safe seat was held by the Conservative candidate Stephanie Kusie on an increased majority.

The by-election was scheduled to coincide with four others across the country, and was one of two to be held in the city of Calgary; Calgary Heritage.

== Background ==
=== Constituency ===
Calgary Midnapore covers the south-eastern corner of Calgary and is named for the Midnapore neighbourhood.

=== Representation ===
The electoral district was created for the 2015 federal election and has had Kenney as its only MP, however predecessor ridings from which Calgary Midnapore was created mostly out of the former seat of Calgary Southeast, with smaller portions coming from Calgary Southwest and Macleod. It had, since the 1993 federal election, successively elected Reform, Canadian Alliance and Conservative MPs.

== Campaign ==
The riding of Calgary Midnapore was vacated by Conservative MP Jason Kenney who resigned his seat effective September 23, 2016, to seek the leadership of the Progressive Conservative Association of Alberta.

The by-election, held on April 3, 2017, was announced on February 22, 2017. The Speaker's warrant regarding the vacancy was received on September 23, 2016. The last day a by-election could have been announced was March 22, 2017, with an election held at least 36 days afterwards.

== Candidates ==
Former diplomat Stephanie Kusie defeated entrepreneur Myles McDougall and local federal riding association president Jack Redekop for the Conservative nomination, held on January 14, 2017.

Haley Brown was acclaimed as the Liberal candidate on January 22.

Holly Heffernan was acclaimed as the NDP candidate on February 6.

Ryan Zedic was acclaimed as the Green Party of Canada candidate on December 8, 2016.

== Results ==
Canadian federal by-election, April 3, 2017: Calgary Midnapore Resignation of Jason Kenney
Party	Candidate	Votes	%	±%	Expenditures
Conservative	Stephanie Kusie	22,454	77.25	+10.52	$115,744.15
Liberal	Haley Brown	4,950	17.03	–5.62	$50,686.42
New Democratic	Holly Heffernan	735	2.53	–5.20	$1,338.85
Green	Ryan Zedic	605	2.08	–0.58	$2,056.40
Christian Heritage	Larry R. Heather	251	0.86	–	$8,591.53
National Advancement	Kulbir Singh Chawla	73	0.25	–	$1,307.66
Total valid votes/expense limit		29,068	99.77	–	$120,973.76
Total rejected ballots		66	0.23	–0.05	
Turnout		29,134	32.46	–40.10	
Eligible voters		89,748			
Conservative hold		Swing		+8.08	
Source: Elections Canada

== 2015 results ==
2015 Canadian federal election: Calgary Midnapore
Party	Candidate	Votes	%	±%	Expenditures
Conservative	Jason Kenney	42,415	66.73	–9.17	$67,515.08
Liberal	Haley Brown	14,396	22.65	+16.24	$11,213.46
New Democratic	Laura Weston	4,915	7.73	–2.82	$18,349.56
Green	Brennan Wauters	1,691	2.66	–3.77	$4,824.13
Marxist–Leninist	Margaret Peggy Askin	145	0.23	–	none listed
Total valid votes/expense limit		63,562	99.72	–	$226,378.17
Total rejected ballots		179	0.28	–	
Turnout		63,741	72.56	–	
Eligible voters		87,848			
Conservative hold		Swing		–12.71	
Source: Library of Parliament
