= List of House members of the 42nd Parliament of Canada =

This is a list of members of the House of Commons of Canada in the 42nd Canadian Parliament.

== Members ==
Key:

- Party leaders are italicized.
- Cabinet ministers are in **boldface**.
- The prime minister is **both**.
- The speaker is indicated by "†".
- Parliamentary secretaries is indicated by "‡".

=== Alberta ===
Name	Party	Electoral district	First elected / previously elected	No. of terms
Blake Richards	Conservative	Banff—Airdrie	2008	3rd term
Kevin Sorenson	Conservative	Battle River—Crowfoot	2000	6th term
Martin Shields	Conservative	Bow River	2015	1st term
**Kent Hehr**	Liberal	Calgary Centre	2015	1st term
Len Webber	Conservative	Calgary Confederation	2015	1st term
Deepak Obhrai (until August 2, 2019)	Conservative	Calgary Forest Lawn	1997	7th term
Vacant		Calgary Forest Lawn	1997	7th term
Stephen Harper (until August 26, 2016)	Conservative	Calgary Heritage	1993, (Note: Calgary West) 2002	7th term*
Bob Benzen (from April 3, 2017)	Conservative	Calgary Heritage	2017	1st term
Jason Kenney (until September 23, 2016)	Conservative	Calgary Midnapore	1997	7th term
Stephanie Kusie (from April 3, 2017)	Conservative	Calgary Midnapore	2017	1st term
Michelle Rempel	Conservative	Calgary Nose Hill	2011	2nd term
Pat Kelly	Conservative	Calgary Rocky Ridge	2015	1st term
Tom Kmiec	Conservative	Calgary Shepard	2015	1st term
Ron Liepert	Conservative	Calgary Signal Hill	2015	1st term
Darshan Kang	Liberal	Calgary Skyview	2015	1st term
Darshan Kang	Independent^{a}	Calgary Skyview	2015	1st term
Randy Boissonnault ‡	Liberal	Edmonton Centre	2015	1st term
Kerry Diotte	Conservative	Edmonton Griesbach	2015	1st term
Ziad Aboultaif	Conservative	Edmonton Manning	2015	1st term
**Amarjeet Sohi**	Liberal	Edmonton Mill Woods	2015	1st term
Matt Jeneroux	Conservative	Edmonton Riverbend	2015	1st term
Linda Duncan	New Democratic	Edmonton Strathcona	2008	3rd term
Kelly McCauley	Conservative	Edmonton West	2015	1st term
Mike Lake	Conservative	Edmonton—Wetaskiwin	2006	4th term
John Barlow	Conservative	Foothills	2014	2nd term
David Yurdiga	Conservative	Fort McMurray—Cold Lake	2014	2nd term
Chris Warkentin	Conservative	Grande Prairie—Mackenzie	2006	4th term
Shannon Stubbs	Conservative	Lakeland	2015	1st term
Rachael Harder	Conservative	Lethbridge	2015	1st term
Jim Hillyer (until March 23, 2016)	Conservative	Medicine Hat—Cardston—Warner	2011	2nd term
Glen Motz (since October 24, 2016)	Conservative	Medicine Hat—Cardston—Warner	2016	1st term
Arnold Viersen	Conservative	Peace River—Westlock	2015	1st term
Blaine Calkins	Conservative	Red Deer—Lacombe	2006	4th term
Earl Dreeshen	Conservative	Red Deer—Mountain View	2008	3rd term
Garnett Genuis	Conservative	Sherwood Park—Fort Saskatchewan	2015	1st term
Michael Cooper	Conservative	St. Albert—Edmonton	2015	1st term
Rona Ambrose^{b} (until July 4, 2017)	Conservative	Sturgeon River—Parkland	2004	5th term
Dane Lloyd (from October 23, 2017)	Conservative	Sturgeon River—Parkland	2017	1st term
Jim Eglinski	Conservative	Yellowhead	2014	2nd term

- **^a** Resigned from caucus on August 31, 2017.
- **^b** Conservative leader until May 27, 2017.

=== British Columbia ===
Name	Party	Electoral district	First elected / previously elected	No. of terms
Ed Fast	Conservative	Abbotsford	2006	4th term
Terry Beech ‡	Liberal	Burnaby North—Seymour	2015	1st term
Kennedy Stewart (until September 14, 2018)	New Democratic	Burnaby South	2011	2nd term
Jagmeet Singh (from February 25, 2019)	New Democratic	Burnaby South	2019	1st term
Todd Doherty	Conservative	Cariboo—Prince George	2015	1st term
Dan Albas	Conservative	Central Okanagan—Similkameen—Nicola	2011	2nd term
Mark Strahl	Conservative	Chilliwack—Hope	2011	2nd term
John Aldag	Liberal	Cloverdale—Langley City	2015	1st term
Ron McKinnon	Liberal	Coquitlam—Port Coquitlam	2015	1st term
Gord Johns	New Democratic	Courtenay—Alberni	2015	1st term
Alistair MacGregor	New Democratic	Cowichan—Malahat—Langford	2015	1st term
**Carla Qualtrough**	Liberal	Delta	2015	1st term
Randall Garrison	New Democratic	Esquimalt—Saanich—Sooke	2011	2nd term
Ken Hardie	Liberal	Fleetwood—Port Kells	2015	1st term
Cathy McLeod	Conservative	Kamloops—Thompson—Cariboo	2008	3rd term
Stephen Fuhr	Liberal	Kelowna—Lake Country	2015	1st term
Wayne Stetski	New Democratic	Kootenay—Columbia	2015	1st term
Mark Warawa (until June 20, 2019)	Conservative	Langley—Aldergrove	2004	5th term
Vacant		Langley—Aldergrove	2004	5th term
Jati Sidhu	Liberal	Mission—Matsqui—Fraser Canyon	2015	1st term
Sheila Malcolmson (until January 2, 2019)	New Democratic	Nanaimo—Ladysmith	2015	1st term
Paul Manly (from May 6, 2019)	Green	Nanaimo—Ladysmith	2019	1st term
Peter Julian	New Democratic	New Westminster—Burnaby	2004	5th term
Rachel Blaney	New Democratic	North Island—Powell River	2015	1st term
Mel Arnold	Conservative	North Okanagan—Shuswap	2015	1st term
**Jonathan Wilkinson** ‡	Liberal	North Vancouver	2015	1st term
Dan Ruimy	Liberal	Pitt Meadows—Maple Ridge	2015	1st term
Fin Donnelly	New Democratic	Port Moody—Coquitlam	2009	3rd term
Bob Zimmer	Conservative	Prince George—Peace River—Northern Rockies	2011	2nd term
Alice Wong	Conservative	Richmond Centre	2008	3rd term
Elizabeth May	Green	Saanich—Gulf Islands	2011	2nd term
Nathan Cullen	New Democratic	Skeena—Bulkley Valley	2004	5th term
Richard Cannings	New Democratic	South Okanagan—West Kootenay	2015	1st term
Dianne Watts (until September 29, 2017)	Conservative	South Surrey—White Rock	2015	1st term
Gordie Hogg (from December 11, 2017)	Liberal	South Surrey—White Rock	2017	1st term
Joe Peschisolido	Liberal	Steveston—Richmond East	2000, (Note: Richmond (First elected as a Canadian Alliance)) 2015	2nd term*
Randeep Sarai	Liberal	Surrey Centre	2015	1st term
Sukh Dhaliwal	Liberal	Surrey—Newton	2006, 2015	3rd term*
Hedy Fry	Liberal	Vancouver Centre	1993	8th term
Jenny Kwan	New Democratic	Vancouver East	2015	1st term
**Jody Wilson-Raybould**	Liberal	Vancouver Granville	2015	1st term
**Jody Wilson-Raybould**	Independent^{c}	Vancouver Granville	2015	1st term
Don Davies	New Democratic	Vancouver Kingsway	2008	3rd term
**Joyce Murray** ‡	Liberal	Vancouver Quadra	2008	4th term
**Harjit Sajjan**	Liberal	Vancouver South	2015	1st term
Murray Rankin	New Democratic	Victoria	2012	2nd term
Pamela Goldsmith-Jones ‡	Liberal	West Vancouver—Sunshine Coast—Sea to Sky Country	2015	1st term

- **^c** Expelled from caucus on April 2, 2019.

=== Manitoba ===
Name	Party	Electoral district	First elected / previously elected	No. of terms
Larry Maguire	Conservative	Brandon—Souris	2013	2nd term
Doug Eyolfson	Liberal	Charleswood—St. James—Assiniboia—Headingley	2015	1st term
Niki Ashton	New Democratic	Churchill—Keewatinook Aski	2008	3rd term
Robert Sopuck	Conservative	Dauphin—Swan River—Neepawa	2010	3rd term
Daniel Blaikie	New Democratic	Elmwood—Transcona	2015	1st term
**MaryAnn Mihychuk**	Liberal	Kildonan—St. Paul	2015	1st term
Candice Bergen	Conservative	Portage—Lisgar	2008	3rd term
Ted Falk	Conservative	Provencher	2013	2nd term
Dan Vandal ‡	Liberal	Saint Boniface—Saint Vital	2015	1st term
James Bezan	Conservative	Selkirk—Interlake—Eastman	2004	5th term
Robert-Falcon Ouellette	Liberal	Winnipeg Centre	2015	1st term
Kevin Lamoureux ‡	Liberal	Winnipeg North	2010	3rd term
Terry Duguid ‡	Liberal	Winnipeg South	2015	1st term
**Jim Carr**	Liberal	Winnipeg South Centre	2015	1st term

=== New Brunswick ===
Name	Party	Electoral district	First elected / previously elected	No. of terms
Serge Cormier ‡	Liberal	Acadie—Bathurst	2015	1st term
**Dominic LeBlanc**	Liberal	Beauséjour	2000	6th term
Matt DeCourcey ‡	Liberal	Fredericton	2015	1st term
Alaina Lockhart ‡	Liberal	Fundy Royal	2015	1st term
René Arseneault	Liberal	Madawaska—Restigouche	2015	1st term
Pat Finnigan	Liberal	Miramichi—Grand Lake	2015	1st term
**Ginette Petitpas Taylor** ‡	Liberal	Moncton—Riverview—Dieppe	2015	1st term
Karen Ludwig	Liberal	New Brunswick Southwest	2015	1st term
Wayne Long	Liberal	Saint John—Rothesay	2015	1st term
T. J. Harvey	Liberal	Tobique—Mactaquac	2015	1st term

=== Newfoundland and Labrador ===
Name	Party	Electoral district	First elected / previously elected	No. of terms
Ken McDonald	Liberal	Avalon	2015	1st term
**Judy Foote** (until September 30, 2017)	Liberal	Bonavista—Burin—Trinity	2008	3rd term
Churence Rogers (from December 11, 2017)	Liberal	Bonavista—Burin—Trinity	2017	1st term
Scott Simms	Liberal	Coast of Bays—Central—Notre Dame	2004	5th term
Yvonne Jones ‡	Liberal	Labrador	2013	2nd term
Gudie Hutchings ‡	Liberal	Long Range Mountains	2015	1st term
Nick Whalen	Liberal	St. John's East	2015	1st term
**Seamus O'Regan**	Liberal	St. John's South—Mount Pearl	2015	1st term

=== Nova Scotia ===
Name	Party	Electoral district	First elected / previously elected	No. of terms
Rodger Cuzner ‡	Liberal	Cape Breton—Canso	2000	6th term
Sean Fraser ‡	Liberal	Central Nova	2015	1st term
Bill Casey	Liberal	Cumberland—Colchester	1988, (Note: First elected as a Progressive Conservative) 1997, (Note: Re-elected as a Progressive Conservative) 2015	7th term*
Darren Fisher	Liberal	Dartmouth—Cole Harbour	2015	1st term
Andy Fillmore ‡	Liberal	Halifax	2015	1st term
Geoff Regan †	Liberal	Halifax West	1993, 2000	7th term*
**Scott Brison** (until February 10, 2019)	Liberal	Kings—Hants	1997, 2000	7th term*
Vacant		Kings—Hants	1997, 2000	7th term*
Darrell Samson	Liberal	Sackville—Preston—Chezzetcook	2015	1st term
**Bernadette Jordan** ‡	Liberal	South Shore—St. Margarets	2015	1st term
Mark Eyking	Liberal	Sydney—Victoria	2000	6th term
Colin Fraser	Liberal	West Nova	2015	1st term

=== Ontario ===
Name	Party	Electoral district	First elected / previously elected	No. of terms
Mark Holland ‡	Liberal	Ajax	2004, 2015	4th term*
Carol Hughes	New Democratic	Algoma—Manitoulin—Kapuskasing	2008	3rd term
Leona Alleslev ‡	Liberal	Aurora—Oak Ridges—Richmond Hill	2015	1st term
Leona Alleslev ‡	Conservative^{d}	Aurora—Oak Ridges—Richmond Hill	2015	1st term
John Brassard	Conservative	Barrie—Innisfil	2015	1st term
Alex Nuttall	Conservative	Barrie—Springwater—Oro-Medonte	2015	1st term
Neil Ellis	Liberal	Bay of Quinte	2015	1st term
Nathaniel Erskine-Smith	Liberal	Beaches—East York	2015	1st term
Ramesh Sangha	Liberal	Brampton Centre	2015	1st term
Raj Grewal	Liberal	Brampton East	2015	1st term
Raj Grewal	Independent^{e}	Brampton East	2015	1st term
Ruby Sahota	Liberal	Brampton North	2015	1st term
Sonia Sidhu	Liberal	Brampton South	2015	1st term
Kamal Khera ‡	Liberal	Brampton West	2015	1st term
Phil McColeman	Conservative	Brantford—Brant	2008	3rd term
Larry Miller	Conservative	Bruce—Grey—Owen Sound	2004	5th term
**Karina Gould** ‡	Liberal	Burlington	2015	1st term
Bryan May	Liberal	Cambridge	2015	1st term
Pierre Poilievre	Conservative	Carleton	2004	5th term
Dave Van Kesteren	Conservative	Chatham-Kent—Leamington	2006	4th term
Julie Dzerowicz	Liberal	Davenport	2015	1st term
Yasmin Ratansi	Liberal	Don Valley East	2004, 2015	4th term*
Geng Tan	Liberal	Don Valley North	2015	1st term
Rob Oliphant ‡	Liberal	Don Valley West	2008, 2015	2nd term*
David Tilson	Conservative	Dufferin—Caledon	2004	5th term
Erin O'Toole	Conservative	Durham	2012	2nd term
Marco Mendicino ‡	Liberal	Eglinton—Lawrence	2015	1st term
Karen Vecchio	Conservative	Elgin—Middlesex—London	2015	1st term
Tracey Ramsey	New Democratic	Essex	2015	1st term
Borys Wrzesnewskyj	Liberal	Etobicoke Centre	2004, 2015	4th term
James Maloney	Liberal	Etobicoke—Lakeshore	2015	1st term
**Kirsty Duncan**	Liberal	Etobicoke North	2008	3rd term
David Sweet	Conservative	Flamborough—Glanbrook	2006	4th term
Francis Drouin	Liberal	Glengarry—Prescott—Russell	2015	1st term
Lloyd Longfield	Liberal	Guelph	2015	1st term
Diane Finley	Conservative	Haldimand—Norfolk	2004	5th term
Jamie Schmale	Conservative	Haliburton—Kawartha Lakes—Brock	2015	1st term
David Christopherson	New Democratic	Hamilton Centre	2004	5th term
Bob Bratina	Liberal	Hamilton East—Stoney Creek	2015	1st term
Scott Duvall	New Democratic	Hamilton Mountain	2015	1st term
**Filomena Tassi**	Liberal	Hamilton West—Ancaster—Dundas	2015	1st term
Mike Bossio	Liberal	Hastings—Lennox and Addington	2015	1st term
Judy Sgro	Liberal	Humber River—Black Creek	1999	7th term
Ben Lobb	Conservative	Huron—Bruce	2008	3rd term
Karen McCrimmon ‡	Liberal	Kanata—Carleton	2015	1st term
Bob Nault	Liberal	Kenora	1988, 2015	5th term*
Deb Schulte ‡	Liberal	King—Vaughan	2015	1st term
Mark Gerretsen	Liberal	Kingston and the Islands	2015	1st term
Raj Saini	Liberal	Kitchener Centre	2015	1st term
Harold Albrecht	Conservative	Kitchener—Conestoga	2006	4th term
Marwan Tabbara	Liberal	Kitchener South—Hespeler	2015	1st term
Bev Shipley	Conservative	Lambton—Kent—Middlesex	2006	4th term
Scott Reid	Conservative	Lanark—Frontenac—Kingston	2000	6th term
Gord Brown (until May 2, 2018)	Conservative	Leeds—Grenville—Thousand Islands and Rideau Lakes	2004	5th term
Michael Barrett (from December 3, 2018)	Conservative	Leeds—Grenville—Thousand Islands and Rideau Lakes	2018	1st term
Irene Mathyssen	New Democratic	London—Fanshawe	2006	4th term
Peter Fragiskatos	Liberal	London North Centre	2015	1st term
Kate Young ‡	Liberal	London West	2015	1st term
**Jane Philpott**	Liberal	Markham—Stouffville	2015	1st term
**Jane Philpott**	Independent^{f}	Markham—Stouffville	2015	1st term
**John McCallum** (until January 31, 2017)	Liberal	Markham—Thornhill	2000	6th term
**Mary Ng** (from April 3, 2017)	Liberal	Markham—Thornhill	2017	1st term
Bob Saroya	Conservative	Markham—Unionville	2015	1st term
Lisa Raitt	Conservative	Milton	2008	3rd term
Omar Alghabra ‡	Liberal	Mississauga Centre	2006, 2015	2nd term*
Peter Fonseca	Liberal	Mississauga East—Cooksville	2015	1st term
Iqra Khalid	Liberal	Mississauga—Erin Mills	2015	1st term
Sven Spengemann	Liberal	Mississauga—Lakeshore	2015	1st term
**Navdeep Bains**	Liberal	Mississauga—Malton	2004, 2015	4th term*
Gagan Sikand	Liberal	Mississauga—Streetsville	2015	1st term
Chandra Arya	Liberal	Nepean	2015	1st term
Kyle Peterson	Liberal	Newmarket—Aurora	2015	1st term
Vance Badawey	Liberal	Niagara Centre	2015	1st term
Rob Nicholson	Conservative	Niagara Falls	1984, 2004	7th term*
Dean Allison	Conservative	Niagara West	2004	5th term
Marc Serré	Liberal	Nickel Belt	2015	1st term
Anthony Rota	Liberal	Nipissing—Timiskaming	2004, 2015	4th term*
Kim Rudd ‡	Liberal	Northumberland—Peterborough South	2015	1st term
John Oliver ‡	Liberal	Oakville	2015	1st term
Pam Damoff ‡	Liberal	Oakville North—Burlington	2015	1st term
Andrew Leslie ‡	Liberal	Orléans	2015	1st term
Colin Carrie	Conservative	Oshawa	2004	5th term
**Catherine McKenna**	Liberal	Ottawa Centre	2015	1st term
David McGuinty	Liberal	Ottawa South	2004	5th term
Mauril Bélanger (until August 16, 2016)	Liberal	Ottawa—Vanier	1995	8th term
Mona Fortier (from April 3, 2017)	Liberal	Ottawa—Vanier	2017	1st term
Anita Vandenbeld	Liberal	Ottawa West—Nepean	2015	1st term
Dave MacKenzie	Conservative	Oxford	2004	5th term
Arif Virani ‡	Liberal	Parkdale—High Park	2015	1st term
Tony Clement	Conservative	Parry Sound-Muskoka	2006	4th term
Tony Clement	Independent^{g}	Parry Sound-Muskoka	2006	4th term
John Nater	Conservative	Perth Wellington	2015	1st term
**Maryam Monsef**	Liberal	Peterborough—Kawartha	2015	1st term
Jennifer O'Connell ‡	Liberal	Pickering—Uxbridge	2015	1st term
Cheryl Gallant	Conservative	Renfrew—Nipissing—Pembroke	2000	6th term
Majid Jowhari	Liberal	Richmond Hill	2015	1st term
Marilyn Gladu	Conservative	Sarnia—Lambton	2015	1st term
Terry Sheehan	Liberal	Sault Ste. Marie	2015	1st term
Arnold Chan (until September 14, 2017)	Liberal	Scarborough—Agincourt	2014	2nd term
Jean Yip (from December 11, 2017)	Liberal	Scarborough—Agincourt	2017	1st term
Salma Zahid	Liberal	Scarborough Centre	2015	1st term
John McKay ‡	Liberal	Scarborough-Guildwood	1997	7th term
Shaun Chen	Liberal	Scarborough North	2015	1st term
Gary Anandasangaree ‡	Liberal	Scarborough—Rouge Park	2015	1st term
**Bill Blair** ‡	Liberal	Scarborough Southwest	2015	1st term
Kellie Leitch	Conservative	Simcoe—Grey	2011	2nd term
Bruce Stanton	Conservative	Simcoe North	2006	4th term
Adam Vaughan ‡	Liberal	Spadina—Fort York	2014	2nd term
Chris Bittle	Liberal	St. Catharines	2015	1st term
Guy Lauzon	Conservative	Stormont—Dundas—South Glengarry	2004	5th term
Paul Lefebvre ‡	Liberal	Sudbury	2015	1st term
Peter Kent	Conservative	Thornhill	2008	3rd term
Don Rusnak ‡	Liberal	Thunder Bay—Rainy River	2015	1st term
**Patty Hajdu**	Liberal	Thunder Bay—Superior North	2015	1st term
Charlie Angus	New Democratic	Timmins-James Bay	2004	5th term
**Bill Morneau**	Liberal	Toronto Centre	2015	1st term
Julie Dabrusin	Liberal	Toronto—Danforth	2015	1st term
**Carolyn Bennett**	Liberal	Toronto—St. Paul's	1997	7th term
**Chrystia Freeland**	Liberal	University—Rosedale	2013	2nd term
Francesco Sorbara	Liberal	Vaughan—Woodbridge	2015	1st term
**Bardish Chagger**	Liberal	Waterloo	2015	1st term
Michael Chong	Conservative	Wellington—Halton Hills	2004	5th term
Celina Caesar-Chavannes ‡	Liberal	Whitby	2015	1st term
Celina Caesar-Chavannes ‡	Independent^{h}	Whitby	2015	1st term
Ali Ehsassi	Liberal	Willowdale	2015	1st term
Cheryl Hardcastle	New Democratic	Windsor—Tecumseh	2015	1st term
Brian Masse	New Democratic	Windsor West	2002	6th term
Michael Levitt	Liberal	York Centre	2015	1st term
Peter Van Loan (until September 30, 2018)	Conservative	York—Simcoe	2004	5th term
Scot Davidson (from February 25, 2019)	Conservative	York—Simcoe	2019	1st term
**Ahmed Hussen**	Liberal	York South—Weston	2015	1st term

- **^d** Changed affiliation on September 17, 2018.
- **^e** Resigned from caucus November 30, 2018.
- **^f** Expelled from caucus on April 2, 2019.
- **^g** Resigned from caucus November 7, 2018.
- **^h** Resigned from caucus March 20, 2019.

=== Prince Edward Island ===
Name	Party	Electoral district	First elected / previously elected	No. of terms
**Lawrence MacAulay**	Liberal	Cardigan	1988	9th term
Sean Casey ‡	Liberal	Charlottetown	2011	2nd term
Bobby Morrissey	Liberal	Egmont	2015	1st term
Wayne Easter	Liberal	Malpeque	1993	8th term

=== Quebec ===
Name	Party	Electoral district	First elected / previously elected	No. of terms
Romeo Saganash	New Democratic	Abitibi—Baie-James—Nunavik—Eeyou	2011	2nd term
Christine Moore	New Democratic	Abitibi—Témiscamingue	2011	2nd term
**Mélanie Joly**	Liberal	Ahuntsic-Cartierville	2015	1st term
Angelo Iacono	Liberal	Alfred-Pellan	2015	1st term
Stéphane Lauzon ‡	Liberal	Argenteuil—La Petite-Nation	2015	1st term
Rémi Massé ‡	Liberal	Avignon—La Mitis—Matane—Matapédia	2015	1st term
Maxime Bernier	Conservative	Beauce	2006	4th term
Maxime Bernier	Independent	Beauce	2006	4th term
Maxime Bernier	People's^{i}	Beauce	2006	4th term
Sylvie Boucher	Conservative	Beauport—Côte-de-Beaupré—Île d'Orléans—Charlevoix	2006, (Note: Beauport—Limoilou) 2015	3rd term*
Alupa Clarke	Conservative	Beauport—Limoilou	2015	1st term
Louis Plamondon	Bloc Québécois	Bécancour—Nicolet—Saurel	1984	10th term
Louis Plamondon	Québec Debout^{j}	Bécancour—Nicolet—Saurel	1984	10th term
Louis Plamondon	Bloc Québécois^{k}	Bécancour—Nicolet—Saurel	1984	10th term
Steven Blaney	Conservative	Bellechasse—Les Etchemins—Lévis	2006	4th term
Matthew Dubé	New Democratic	Beloeil—Chambly	2011	2nd term
Ruth Ellen Brosseau	New Democratic	Berthier—Maskinongé	2011	2nd term
Emmanuel Dubourg ‡	Liberal	Bourassa	2013	2nd term
Denis Paradis	Liberal	Brome—Missisquoi	1995, 2015	5th term*
Alexandra Mendès	Liberal	Brossard—Saint-Lambert	2008, 2015	2nd term*
Pierre Paul-Hus	Conservative	Charlesbourg—Haute-Saint-Charles	2015	1st term
Brenda Shanahan	Liberal	Châteauguay—Lacolle	2015	1st term
Denis Lemieux (until December 1, 2017)	Liberal	Chicoutimi—Le Fjord	2015	1st term
Richard Martel (from June 18, 2018)	Conservative	Chicoutimi—Le Fjord	2018	1st term
**Marie-Claude Bibeau**	Liberal	Compton—Stanstead	2015	1st term
Anju Dhillon ‡	Liberal	Dorval—Lachine—LaSalle	2015	1st term
François Choquette	New Democratic	Drummond	2011	2nd term
**Diane Lebouthillier**	Liberal	Gaspésie—Les Îles-de-la-Madeleine	2015	1st term
Steven MacKinnon ‡	Liberal	Gatineau	2015	1st term
Marjolaine Boutin-Sweet	New Democratic	Hochelaga	2011	2nd term
**Pablo Rodríguez** ‡	Liberal	Honoré-Mercier	2004, 2015	4th term*
Greg Fergus ‡	Liberal	Hull—Aylmer	2015	1st term
Gabriel Ste-Marie	Bloc Québécois	Joliette	2015	1st term
Gabriel Ste-Marie	Québec Debout^{j}	Joliette	2015	1st term
Gabriel Ste-Marie	Bloc Québécois^{k}	Joliette	2015	1st term
Karine Trudel	New Democratic	Jonquière	2015	1st term
Mario Beaulieu	Bloc Québécois	La Pointe-de-l'Île	2015	1st term
Jean-Claude Poissant ‡	Liberal	La Prairie	2015	1st term
Denis Lebel (until August 9, 2017)	Conservative	Lac-Saint-Jean	2007	4th term
Richard Hébert‡ (from October 23, 2017)	Liberal	Lac-Saint-Jean	2017	1st term
Francis Scarpaleggia	Liberal	Lac-Saint-Louis	2004	5th term
**David Lametti** ‡	Liberal	LaSalle—Émard—Verdun	2015	1st term
David Graham	Liberal	Laurentides—Labelle	2015	1st term
Hélène Laverdière	New Democratic	Laurier—Sainte-Marie	2011	2nd term
Fayçal El-Khoury	Liberal	Laval—Les Îles	2015	1st term
Jacques Gourde	Conservative	Lévis—Lotbinière	2006	4th term
Sherry Romanado ‡	Liberal	Longueuil—Charles-LeMoyne	2015	1st term
Pierre Nantel	New Democratic	Longueuil—Saint-Hubert	2011	2nd term
Pierre Nantel	Independent	Longueuil—Saint-Hubert	2011	2nd term
Pierre Nantel	Green^{l}	Longueuil—Saint-Hubert	2011	2nd term
Joël Lightbound ‡	Liberal	Louis-Hébert	2015	1st term
Gérard Deltell	Conservative	Louis-Saint-Laurent	2015	1st term
Marilène Gill	Bloc Québécois	Manicouagan	2015	1st term
Yves Robillard	Liberal	Marc-Aurèle-Fortin	2015	1st term
Luc Berthold	Conservative	Mégantic—L'Érable	2015	1st term
Simon Marcil	Bloc Québécois	Mirabel	2015	1st term
Simon Marcil	Québec Debout^{j}	Mirabel	2015	1st term
Simon Marcil	Bloc Québécois^{m}	Mirabel	2015	1st term
Michel Picard ‡	Liberal	Montarville	2015	1st term
Luc Thériault	Bloc Québécois	Montcalm	2015	1st term
Luc Thériault	Québec Debout^{j}	Montcalm	2015	1st term
Luc Thériault	Bloc Québécois^{k}	Montcalm	2015	1st term
Bernard Généreux	Conservative	Montmagny—L'Islet—Kamouraska—Rivière-du-Loup	2009, 2015	2nd term*
Anthony Housefather	Liberal	Mount Royal	2015	1st term
**Marc Garneau**	Liberal	Notre-Dame-de-Grâce—Westmount	2008	3rd term
Thomas Mulcair^{n} (until August 3, 2018)	New Democratic	Outremont	2007	4th term
Rachel Bendayan (from February 25, 2019)	Liberal	Outremont	2019	1st term
**Justin Trudeau**	Liberal	Papineau	2008	3rd term
Xavier Barsalou-Duval	Bloc Québécois	Pierre-Boucher—Les Patriotes—Verchères	2015	1st term
Frank Baylis	Liberal	Pierrefonds—Dollard	2015	1st term
Will Amos	Liberal	Pontiac	2015	1st term
Joël Godin	Conservative	Portneuf—Jacques-Cartier	2015	1st term
**Jean-Yves Duclos**	Liberal	Québec	2015	1st term
Monique Pauzé	Bloc Québécois	Repentigny	2015	1st term
Monique Pauzé	Québec Debout^{j}	Repentigny	2015	1st term
Monique Pauzé	Bloc Québécois^{k}	Repentigny	2015	1st term
Alain Rayes	Conservative	Richmond—Arthabaska	2015	1st term
Guy Caron	New Democratic	Rimouski-Neigette—Témiscouata—Les Basques	2011	2nd term
Linda Lapointe	Liberal	Rivière-des-Mille-Îles	2015	1st term
Rhéal Fortin^{o}	Bloc Québécois	Rivière-du-Nord	2015	1st term
Rhéal Fortin^{o}	Québec Debout^{j}	Rivière-du-Nord	2015	1st term
Rhéal Fortin^{o}	Bloc Québécois^{k}	Rivière-du-Nord	2015	1st term
Alexandre Boulerice	New Democratic	Rosemont—La Petite-Patrie	2011	2nd term
Brigitte Sansoucy	New Democratic	Saint-Hyacinthe—Bagot	2015	1st term
Jean Rioux ‡	Liberal	Saint-Jean	2015	1st term
**Stéphane Dion** (until January 31, 2017)	Liberal	Saint-Laurent	1996	8th term
Emmanuella Lambropoulos (from April 3, 2017)	Liberal	Saint-Laurent	2017	1st term
Nicola Di Iorio (until January 29, 2019)	Liberal	Saint-Léonard—Saint-Michel	2015	1st term
Vacant		Saint-Léonard—Saint-Michel	2015	1st term
**François-Philippe Champagne** ‡	Liberal	Saint-Maurice—Champlain	2015	1st term
Anne Minh-Thu Quach	New Democratic	Salaberry—Suroît	2011	2nd term
Pierre Breton	Liberal	Shefford	2015	1st term
Pierre-Luc Dusseault	New Democratic	Sherbrooke	2011	2nd term
Michel Boudrias	Bloc Québécois	Terrebonne	2015	1st term
Michel Boudrias	Québec Debout^{j}	Terrebonne	2015	1st term
Michel Boudrias	Bloc Québécois^{m}	Terrebonne	2015	1st term
Ramez Ayoub	Liberal	Thérèse-De Blainville	2015	1st term
Robert Aubin	New Democratic	Trois-Rivières	2011	2nd term
Peter Schiefke ‡	Liberal	Vaudreuil—Soulanges	2015	1st term
Marc Miller ‡	Liberal	Ville-Marie—Le Sud-Ouest—Île-des-Sœurs	2015	1st term
Eva Nassif	Liberal	Vimy	2015	1st term

- **^i** Resigned from caucus August 23, 2018. Changed affiliation on September 14, 2018.
- **^j** Resigned from caucus February 28, 2017.
- **^k** Changed affiliation on September 17, 2018.
- **^l** Expelled from New Democratic caucus August 16, 2019; joined Green caucus on August 19, 2019.
- **^m** Changed affiliation on June 6, 2018.
- **^n** New Democratic leader until October 1, 2017.
- **^o** Bloc Québécois leader until March 18, 2017.

=== Saskatchewan ===
Name	Party	Electoral district	First elected / previously elected	No. of terms
Gerry Ritz (until October 2, 2017)	Conservative	Battlefords—Lloydminster	1997	7th term
Rosemarie Falk (from December 11, 2017)	Conservative	Battlefords—Lloydminster	2017	1st term
Kelly Block	Conservative	Carlton Trail—Eagle Creek	2008	3rd term
David Anderson	Conservative	Cypress Hills—Grasslands	2000	6th term
Georgina Jolibois	New Democratic	Desnethé—Missinippi—Churchill River	2015	1st term
Tom Lukiwski	Conservative	Moose Jaw—Lake Centre—Lanigan	2004	5th term
Randy Hoback	Conservative	Prince Albert	2008	3rd term
Erin Weir	New Democratic	Regina—Lewvan	2015	1st term
Erin Weir	Independent	Regina—Lewvan	2015	1st term
Erin Weir	CCF^{p}	Regina—Lewvan	2015	1st term
Andrew Scheer^{q}	Conservative	Regina—Qu'Appelle	2004	5th term
**Ralph Goodale**	Liberal	Regina—Wascana	1974, (Note: Assiniboia) 1993	9th term*
Kevin Waugh	Conservative	Saskatoon—Grasswood	2015	1st term
Brad Trost	Conservative	Saskatoon—University	2004	5th term
Sheri Benson	New Democratic	Saskatoon West	2015	1st term
Robert Kitchen	Conservative	Souris—Moose Mountain	2015	1st term
Cathay Wagantall	Conservative	Yorkton—Melville	2015	1st term

- **^p** Expelled from New Democratic caucus May 3, 2018; declared himself a member of the CCF on May 11, 2018.
- **^q** Conservative leader since May 27, 2017.

=== Territories ===
Name	Party	Electoral district	First elected / previously elected	No. of terms
Michael McLeod	Liberal	Northwest Territories	2015	1st term
**Hunter Tootoo**	Liberal	Nunavut	2015	1st term
**Hunter Tootoo**	Independent^{r}	Nunavut	2015	1st term
Larry Bagnell	Liberal	Yukon	2000, 2015	5th term*

- **^r** Resigned from caucus May 31, 2016.

== Changes since the 42nd election ==
The party standings have changed as follows:

=== Membership changes ===
Date	District	Name	Party before	Party after	Reason
March 23, 2016	Medicine Hat—Cardston—Warner	Jim Hillyer	Conservative	Vacant	Died of an apparent heart attack
May 31, 2016	Nunavut	Hunter Tootoo	Liberal	Independent	Left Cabinet and the Liberal caucus to undergo addiction treatment
August 16, 2016	Ottawa—Vanier	Mauril Bélanger	Liberal	Vacant	Died of amyotrophic lateral sclerosis
August 26, 2016	Calgary Heritage	Stephen Harper	Conservative	Vacant	Resigned
September 23, 2016	Calgary Midnapore	Jason Kenney	Conservative	Vacant	Resigned to enter provincial politics
October 24, 2016	Medicine Hat—Cardston—Warner	Glen Motz	Vacant	Conservative	Elected as a member of parliament in a by-election
January 31, 2017	Saint-Laurent	Stéphane Dion	Liberal	Vacant	Resigned to enter diplomatic post
January 31, 2017	Markham—Thornhill	John McCallum	Liberal	Vacant	Resigned to enter diplomatic post
April 3, 2017	Calgary Heritage	Bob Benzen	Vacant	Conservative	Elected in a by-election
April 3, 2017	Ottawa—Vanier	Mona Fortier	Vacant	Liberal	Elected in a by-election
April 3, 2017	Calgary Midnapore	Stephanie Kusie	Vacant	Conservative	Elected in a by-election
April 3, 2017	Saint-Laurent	Emmanuella Lambropoulos	Vacant	Liberal	Elected in a by-election
April 3, 2017	Markham—Thornhill	Mary Ng	Vacant	Liberal	Elected in a by-election
July 4, 2017	Sturgeon River—Parkland	Rona Ambrose	Conservative	Vacant	Resigned to join the Wilson Center as a visiting scholar
August 9, 2017	Lac-Saint-Jean	Denis Lebel	Conservative	Vacant	Resigned to accept a position in the private sector
August 31, 2017	Calgary Skyview	Darshan Kang	Liberal	Independent	Resigned from the Liberal caucus amid allegations of sexual assault
September 14, 2017	Scarborough—Agincourt	Arnold Chan	Liberal	Vacant	Died of cancer
September 29, 2017	South Surrey—White Rock	Dianne Watts	Conservative	Vacant	Resigned to seek the leadership of the British Columbia Liberal Party
September 30, 2017	Bonavista—Burin—Trinity	Judy Foote	Liberal	Vacant	Resigned due to illness in her family
October 2, 2017	Battlefords—Lloydminster	Gerry Ritz	Conservative	Vacant	Resigned
October 23, 2017	Sturgeon River—Parkland	Dane Lloyd	Vacant	Conservative	Elected in a by-election
October 23, 2017	Lac-Saint-Jean	Richard Hébert	Vacant	Liberal	Elected in a by-election
December 1, 2017	Chicoutimi—Le Fjord	Denis Lemieux	Liberal	Vacant	Resigned
December 11, 2017	Bonavista—Burin—Trinity	Churence Rogers	Vacant	Liberal	Elected as a member of parliament in a by-election
December 11, 2017	Scarborough—Agincourt	Jean Yip	Vacant	Liberal	Elected as a member of parliament in a by-election
December 11, 2017	Battlefords—Lloydminster	Rosemarie Falk	Vacant	Conservative	Elected as a member of parliament in a by-election
December 11, 2017	South Surrey—White Rock	Gordie Hogg	Vacant	Liberal	Elected as a member of parliament in a by-election
February 28, 2018	Terrebonne	Michel Boudrias	Bloc Québécois	Québec debout (Note: At the time known as the Groupe parlementaire québécois)	Resigned from the Bloc Québécois caucus citing conflict with party leader Martine Ouellet
February 28, 2018	Rivière-du-Nord	Rhéal Fortin	Bloc Québécois	Québec debout	Resigned from the Bloc Québécois caucus citing conflict with party leader Martine Ouellet
February 28, 2018	Mirabel	Simon Marcil	Bloc Québécois	Québec debout	Resigned from the Bloc Québécois caucus citing conflict with party leader Martine Ouellet
February 28, 2018	Repentigny	Monique Pauzé	Bloc Québécois	Québec debout	Resigned from the Bloc Québécois caucus citing conflict with party leader Martine Ouellet
February 28, 2018	Bécancour—Nicolet—Saurel	Louis Plamondon	Bloc Québécois	Québec debout	Resigned from the Bloc Québécois caucus citing conflict with party leader Martine Ouellet
February 28, 2018	Joliette	Gabriel Ste-Marie	Bloc Québécois	Québec debout	Resigned from the Bloc Québécois caucus citing conflict with party leader Martine Ouellet
February 28, 2018	Montcalm	Luc Thériault	Bloc Québécois	Québec debout	Resigned from the Bloc Québécois caucus citing conflict with party leader Martine Ouellet
May 2, 2018	Leeds—Grenville—Thousand Islands and Rideau Lakes	Gord Brown	Conservative	Vacant	Died of a heart attack
May 3, 2018	Regina—Lewvan	Erin Weir	New Democratic	Independent	Expelled from NDP caucus following investigation into allegations of sexual misconduct, then changed affiliation to CCF
May 11, 2018	Regina—Lewvan	Erin Weir	Independent	CCF	Expelled from NDP caucus following investigation into allegations of sexual misconduct, then changed affiliation to CCF
June 6, 2018	Terrebonne	Michel Boudrias	Québec debout	Bloc Québécois	Rejoined the Bloc Québécois caucus following the resignation of party leader Martine Ouellet
June 6, 2018	Mirabel	Simon Marcil	Québec debout	Bloc Québécois	Rejoined the Bloc Québécois caucus following the resignation of party leader Martine Ouellet
June 18, 2018	Chicoutimi—Le Fjord	Richard Martel	Vacant	Conservative	Elected as a member of parliament in a by-election
August 3, 2018	Outremont	Thomas Mulcair	New Democratic	Vacant	Resigned
August 23, 2018	Beauce	Maxime Bernier	Conservative	Independent	Resigned from the Conservative caucus, and changed affiliation to newly created People's Party
September 14, 2018	Beauce	Maxime Bernier	Independent	People's	Resigned from the Conservative caucus, and changed affiliation to newly created People's Party
September 14, 2018	Burnaby South	Kennedy Stewart	New Democratic	Vacant	Resigned to run for Mayor of Vancouver in the 2018 Vancouver municipal election
September 17, 2018	Rivière-du-Nord	Rhéal Fortin	Québec debout	Bloc Québécois	Rejoined the Bloc Québécois caucus
September 17, 2018	Repentigny	Monique Pauzé	Québec debout	Bloc Québécois	Rejoined the Bloc Québécois caucus
September 17, 2018	Bécancour—Nicolet—Saurel	Louis Plamondon	Québec debout	Bloc Québécois	Rejoined the Bloc Québécois caucus
September 17, 2018	Joliette	Gabriel Ste-Marie	Québec debout	Bloc Québécois	Rejoined the Bloc Québécois caucus
September 17, 2018	Montcalm	Luc Thériault	Québec debout	Bloc Québécois	Rejoined the Bloc Québécois caucus
September 17, 2018	Aurora—Oak Ridges—Richmond Hill	Leona Alleslev	Liberal	Conservative	Changed affiliation
September 30, 2018	York—Simcoe	Peter Van Loan	Conservative	Vacant	Resigned
November 7, 2018	Parry Sound-Muskoka	Tony Clement	Conservative	Independent	Resigned from the Conservative caucus amid sexting scandal
November 30, 2018	Brampton East	Raj Grewal	Liberal	Independent	Resigned from the Liberal caucus due to controversy around his problem gambling and alleged ethical breaches
December 3, 2018	Leeds—Grenville—Thousand Islands and Rideau Lakes	Michael Barrett	Vacant	Conservative	Elected as a member of parliament in a by-election
January 2, 2019	Nanaimo—Ladysmith	Sheila Malcolmson	New Democratic	Vacant	Resigned to enter provincial politics
January 29, 2019	Saint-Léonard—Saint-Michel	Nicola Di Iorio	Liberal	Vacant	Resigned
February 10, 2019	Kings—Hants	Scott Brison	Liberal	Vacant	Resigned
February 25, 2019	Outremont	Rachel Bendayan	Vacant	Liberal	Elected as a member of parliament in a by-election
February 25, 2019	York—Simcoe	Scot Davidson	Vacant	Conservative	Elected as a member of parliament in a by-election
February 25, 2019	Burnaby South	Jagmeet Singh	Vacant	New Democratic	Elected as a member of parliament in a by-election
March 20, 2019	Whitby	Celina Caesar-Chavannes	Liberal	Independent	Resigned from caucus
April 2, 2019	Markham—Stouffville	Jane Philpott	Liberal	Independent	Removed from the Liberal caucus
April 2, 2019	Vancouver Granville	Jody Wilson-Raybould	Liberal	Independent	Removed from the Liberal caucus
May 6, 2019	Nanaimo—Ladysmith	Paul Manly	Vacant	Green	Elected as a member of parliament in a by-election
June 20, 2019	Langley—Aldergrove	Mark Warawa	Conservative	Vacant	Died of cancer
August 2, 2019	Calgary Forest Lawn	Deepak Obhrai	Conservative	Vacant	Died of cancer
August 16, 2019	Longueuil—Saint-Hubert	Pierre Nantel	New Democratic	Independent	Expelled from NDP caucus following revelations that he had been in private talks to run for another political party in the next general election
September 1, 2019	Victoria	Murray Rankin	New Democratic	Vacant	Resigned

=== Standings ===
The party standings in the House of Commons have changed as follows:

October 19, 2015 – December 11, 2017
Number of members per party by date	2015	2016						2017										
Number of members per party by date	Oct 19	Mar 23	May 31	Aug 16	Aug 26	Sep 23	Oct 24	Jan 31	Apr 3	Jul 4	Aug 9	Aug 31	Sep 14	Sep 30	Oct 2	Oct 23	Dec 1	Dec 11
Liberal	184		183	182				180	183			182	181	180		181	180	183
Conservative	99	98			97	96	97		99	98	97			96	95	96		97
New Democratic	44																	
Bloc Québécois	10																	
Green	1																	
Independent	0		1									2						
Total members	338	337		336	335	334	335	333	338	337	336		335	333	332	334	333	337
Government majority	30	31	29	28	29	30	29	27	28	29	30	28	27	27	28	28	27	29
Vacant	0	1		2	3	4	3	5	0	1	2		3	5	6	4	5	1

February 28, 2018 – February 25, 2019
Number of members per party by date	2018														2019			
Number of members per party by date	Feb 28	May 2	May 3	May 11	Jun 6	Jun 18	Aug 3	Aug 23	Sep 14	Sep 17	Sep 30	Nov 7	Nov 30	Dec 3	Jan 2	Jan 29	Feb 10	Feb 25
Liberal	183									182			181			180	179	180
Conservative	97	96				97		96		97	96	95		96				97
New Democratic	44		43				42		41						40			41
Bloc Québécois	3				5					10								
Québec debout	7				5					—								
Green	1																	
Co-operative Commonwealth	—			1														
People's	—								1									
Independent	2			3	2				3	2			3	4				
Total members	337	336				337	336		335		334			335	334	333	332	335
Government majority	29	30				29	30		31	29	30		28	27	28	27	26	25
Vacant	1	2				1	2		3		4			3	4	5	6	3

March 20 – September 11, 2019
Number of members per party by date	2019						
Number of members per party by date	Mar 20	Apr 2	May 6	Jun 20	Aug 2	Aug 16	Sep 1
Liberal	179	177					
Conservative	97			96	95		
New Democratic	41					40	39
Bloc Québécois	10						
Green	1		2				
Co-operative Commonwealth	1						
People's	1						
Independent	5		7			8	
Total members	335		336	335	334		333
Government majority	24	22	21	22	23		
Vacant	3		2	3	4		5
