= 2019 Canadian federal election in Quebec =

- October 21, 2019

All 78 Quebec seats in the House of Commons of Canada
- Opinion polls
- Turnout: 4,230,638 (65.5%)
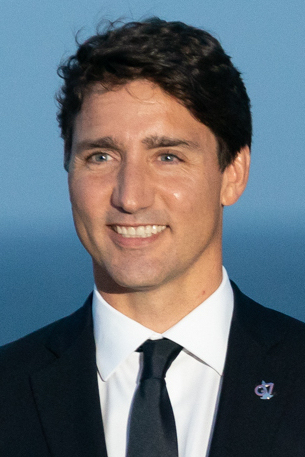

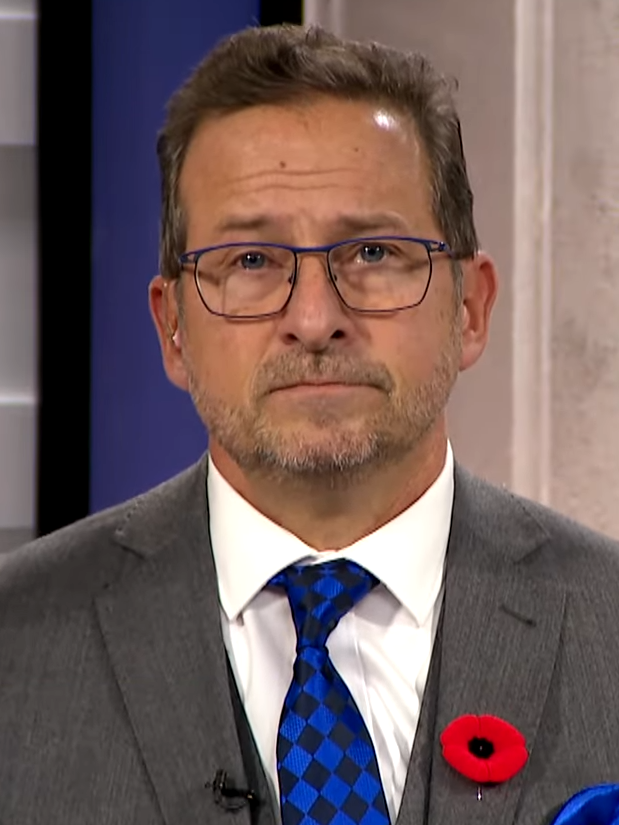

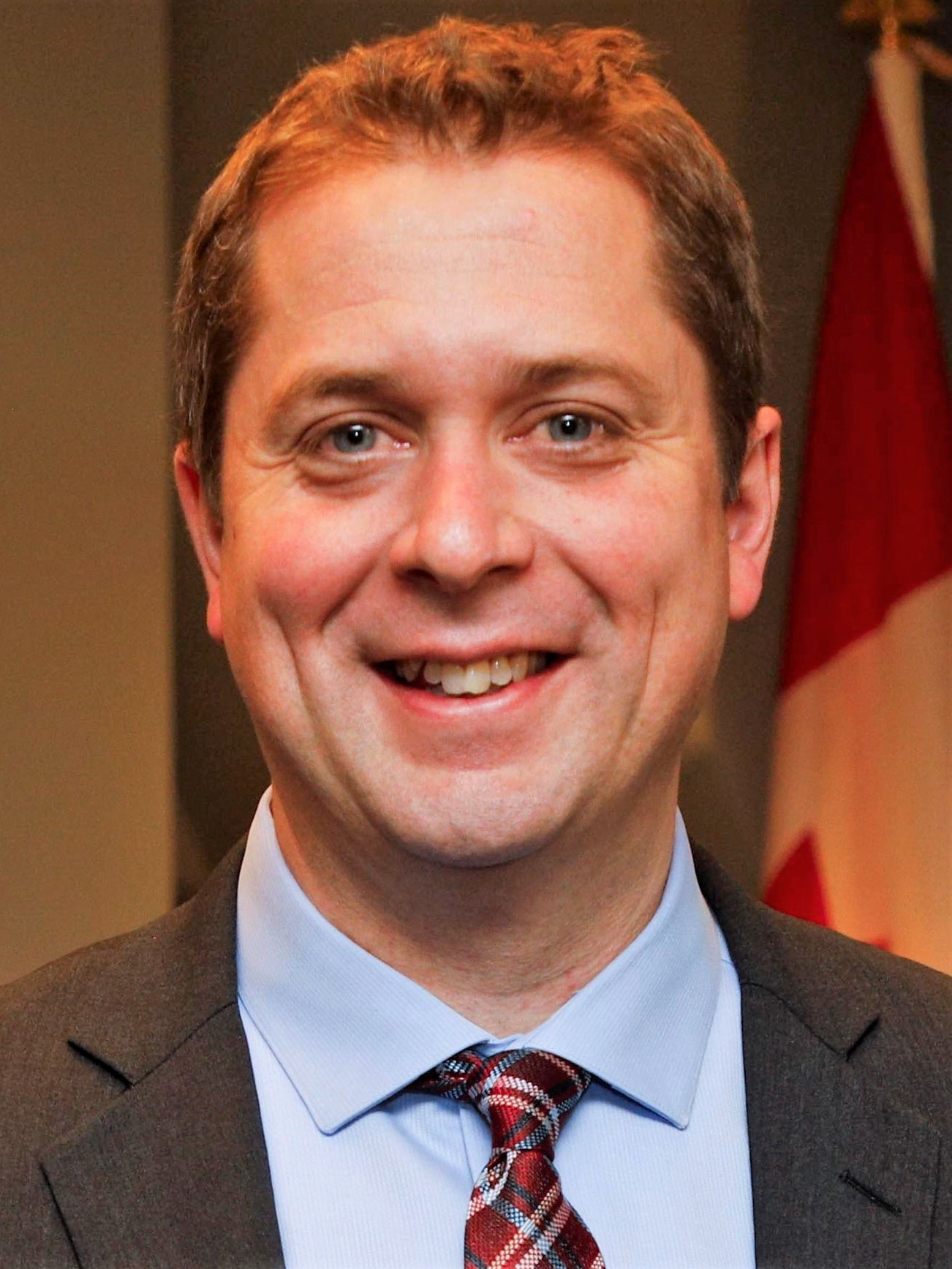

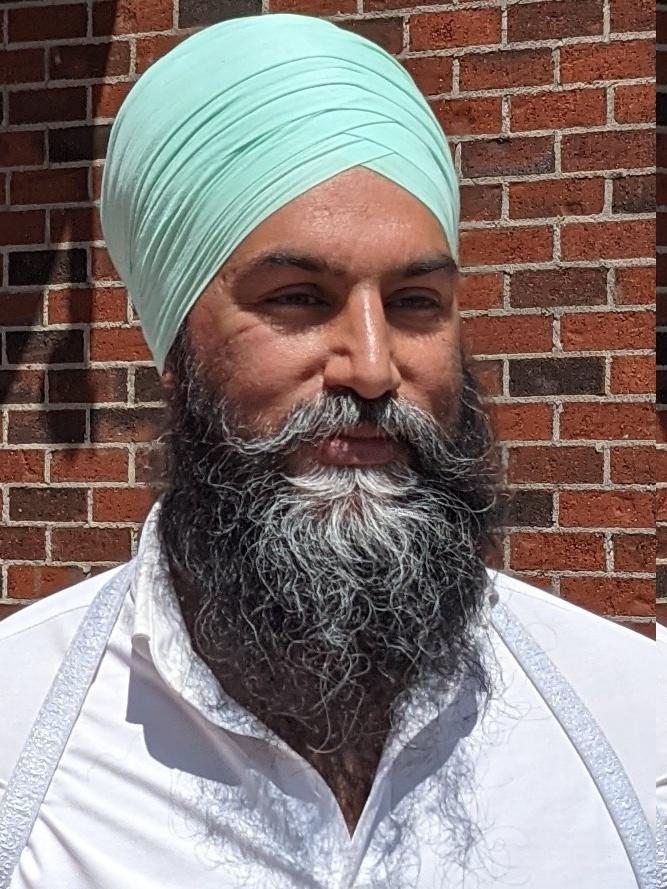

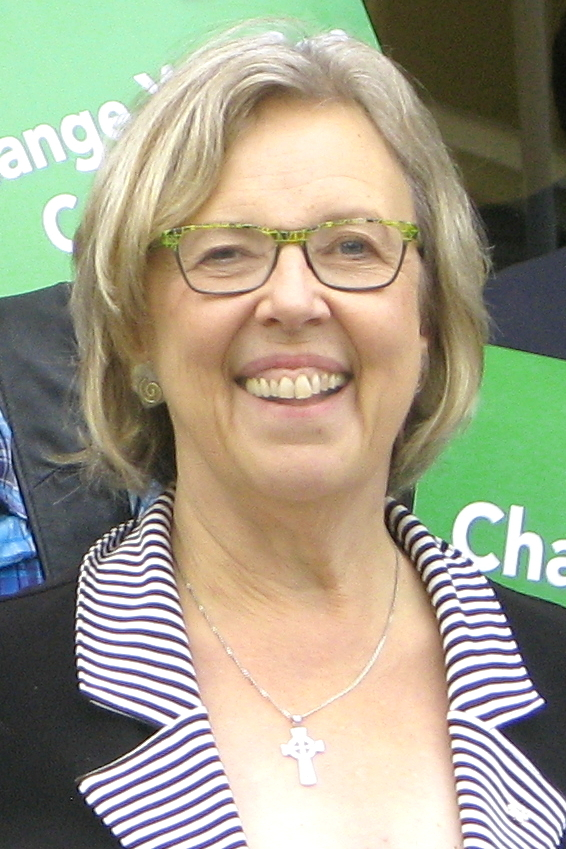

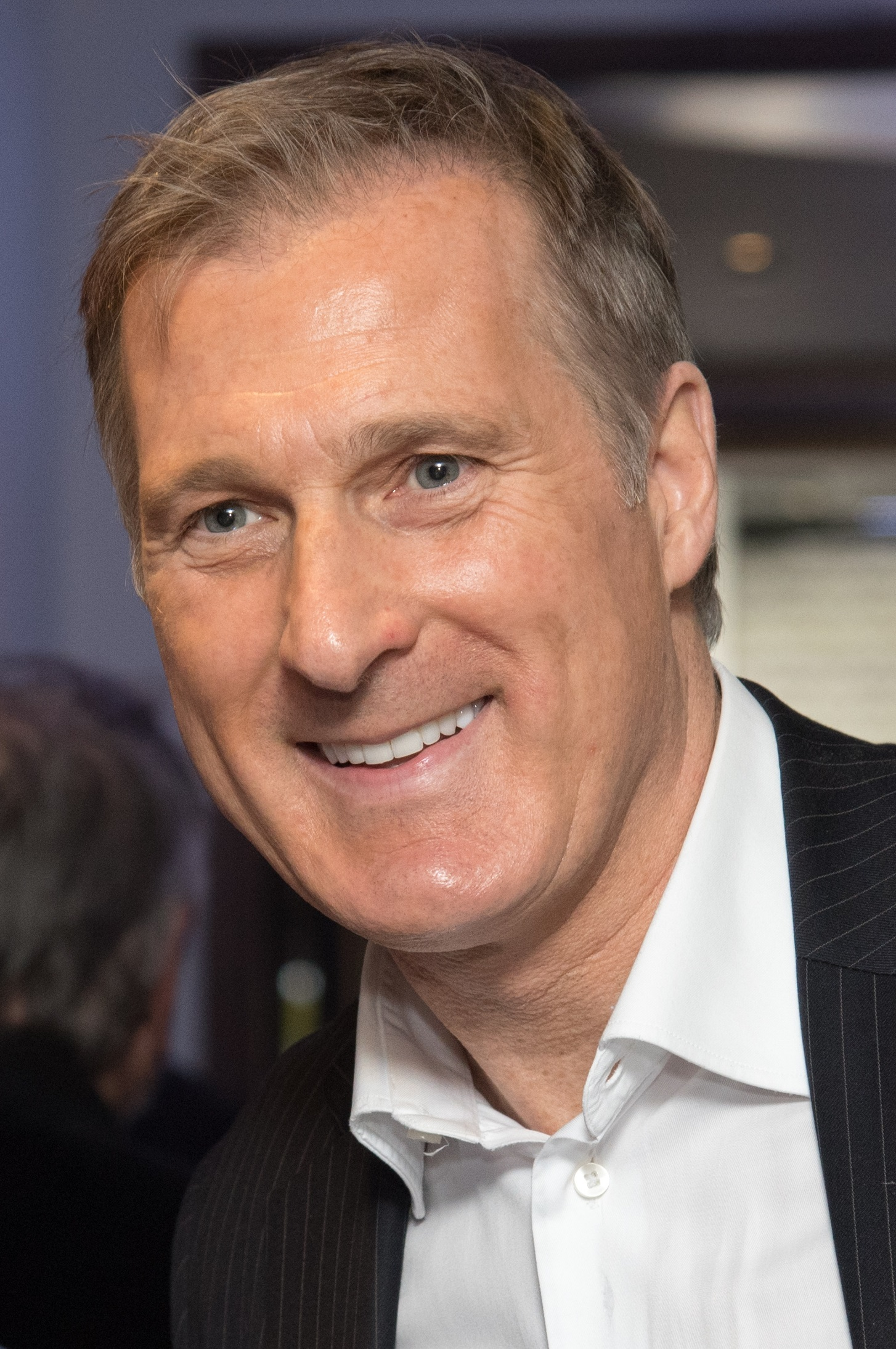
	First party	Second party	Third party
Leader	Justin Trudeau	Yves-François Blanchet	Andrew Scheer
Party	Liberal	Bloc Québécois	Conservative
Leader since	April 14, 2013	January 17, 2019	May 27, 2017
Last election	40 seats, 35.7%	10 seats, 19.3%	12 seats, 16.7%
Seats before	40	10	11
Seats won	35	32	10
Seat change	▼5	▲22	▼1
Popular vote	1,468,603	1,387,030	684,661
Percentage	34.3%	32.4%	16.0%
Swing	▼1.4 pp	▲13.1 pp	▼0.7 pp
	Fourth party	Fifth party	Sixth party
Leader	Jagmeet Singh	Elizabeth May	Maxime Bernier
Party	New Democratic	Green	People's
Leader since	October 1, 2017	August 27, 2006	September 14, 2018
Last election	16 seats, 25.4%	0 seat, 2.3%	New party
Seats before	14	0 (Note: Does not include Pierre Nantel, who sat as an independent at the dissolution of Parliament, but ran as a Green Party candidate in the 2019 election)	1
Seats won	1	0	0
Seat change	▼13	0	▼1
Popular vote	464,414	193,420	62,951
Percentage	10.8%	4.5%	1.5%
Swing	▼14.6 pp	▲2.2 pp	New party
Prime Minister before election
Justin Trudeau
Liberal
Prime Minister after election
Justin Trudeau
Liberal

In the 2019 Canadian federal election, there were 78 members of Parliament elected to the House of Commons from the province of Quebec, making up 23.1% of all members of the House.

== Background ==
=== Timeline ===
Changes in Quebec seats held (2015–2019)
Seat	Before				Change		
Seat	Date	Member	Party	Reason	Date	Member	Party
Saint-Laurent	January 31, 2017	Stéphane Dion	█ Liberal	Resigned to enter diplomatic post	April 3, 2017	Emmanuella Lambropoulos	█ Liberal
Lac-Saint-Jean	August 9, 2017	Denis Lebel	█ Conservative	Resigned to accept a position in the private sector	October 23, 2017	Richard Hébert	█ Liberal
Chicoutimi—Le Fjord	December 1, 2017	Denis Lemieux	█ Liberal	Resigned	June 18, 2018	Richard Martel	█ Conservative
Terrebonne	February 28, 2018	Michel Boudrias	█ Bloc Québécois	Resigned from the Bloc Québécois caucus citing conflict with party leader Martine Ouellet			█ Groupe parl qué
Rivière-du-Nord	February 28, 2018	Rhéal Fortin	█ Bloc Québécois	Resigned from the Bloc Québécois caucus citing conflict with party leader Martine Ouellet			█ Groupe parl qué
Mirabel	February 28, 2018	Simon Marcil	█ Bloc Québécois	Resigned from the Bloc Québécois caucus citing conflict with party leader Martine Ouellet			█ Groupe parl qué
Repentigny	February 28, 2018	Monique Pauzé	█ Bloc Québécois	Resigned from the Bloc Québécois caucus citing conflict with party leader Martine Ouellet			█ Groupe parl qué
Bécancour—Nicolet—Saurel	February 28, 2018	Louis Plamondon	█ Bloc Québécois	Resigned from the Bloc Québécois caucus citing conflict with party leader Martine Ouellet			█ Groupe parl qué
Joliette	February 28, 2018	Gabriel Ste-Marie	█ Bloc Québécois	Resigned from the Bloc Québécois caucus citing conflict with party leader Martine Ouellet			█ Groupe parl qué
Montcalm	February 28, 2018	Luc Thériault	█ Bloc Québécois	Resigned from the Bloc Québécois caucus citing conflict with party leader Martine Ouellet			█ Groupe parl qué
Terrebonne	June 6, 2018	Michel Boudrias	█ Groupe parl qué	Rejoined the Bloc Québécois caucus following the resignation of party leader Martine Ouellet			█ Bloc Québécois
Mirabel	June 6, 2018	Simon Marcil	█ Groupe parl qué	Rejoined the Bloc Québécois caucus following the resignation of party leader Martine Ouellet			█ Bloc Québécois
Outremont	August 3, 2018	Thomas Mulcair	█ New Democratic	Resigned	February 25, 2019	Rachel Bendayan	█ Liberal
Beauce	August 23, 2018	Maxime Bernier	█ Conservative	Resigned from the Conservative caucus, and changed affiliation to newly created People's Party	September 14, 2018		█ People's
Rivière-du-Nord	September 17, 2018	Rhéal Fortin	█ Groupe parl qué	Rejoined the Bloc Québécois caucus			█ Bloc Québécois
Repentigny	September 17, 2018	Monique Pauzé	█ Groupe parl qué	Rejoined the Bloc Québécois caucus			█ Bloc Québécois
Bécancour—Nicolet—Saurel	September 17, 2018	Louis Plamondon	█ Groupe parl qué	Rejoined the Bloc Québécois caucus			█ Bloc Québécois
Joliette	September 17, 2018	Gabriel Ste-Marie	█ Groupe parl qué	Rejoined the Bloc Québécois caucus			█ Bloc Québécois
Montcalm	September 17, 2018	Luc Thériault	█ Groupe parl qué	Rejoined the Bloc Québécois caucus			█ Bloc Québécois
Saint-Léonard—Saint-Michel	January 29, 2019	Nicola Di Iorio	█ Liberal	Resigned			█ Vacant
Longueuil—Saint-Hubert	August 16, 2019	Pierre Nantel	█ New Democratic	Expelled from NDP caucus following revelations that he had been in private talks to run for another political party in the next general election			█ Independent (Note: Sat as an independent for the remainder of his term, but ran as a Green Party candidate in the 2019 election)

=== Opinion polling ===
Opinion polling the election campaign

Opinion polling from 2015 to 2019

Polling firm	Last date of polling	Link	LPC	CPC	NDP	BQ	GPC	PPC^{[1]}	Other	Margin of error (Note: In cases when linked poll details distinguish between the margin of error associated with the total sample of respondents (including undecided and non-voters) and that of the subsample of decided/leaning voters, the former is included in the table. Also not included is the margin of error created by rounding to the nearest whole number or any margin of error from methodological sources. Most online polls (because of their opt-in method of recruiting panelists which results in a non-random sample) cannot have a margin of error. In such cases, shown is what the margin of error would be for a survey using a random probability-based sample of equivalent size.)	Sample size (Note: Refers to the total, "raw" sample size, including undecided and non-voters, and before demographic weighting is applied. Fractions in parentheses apply to rolling polls (see below) and indicate the proportion of the sample that is independent from the previous poll in the series.)	Polling method (Note: "Telephone" refers to traditional telephone polls conducted by live interviewers; "IVR" refers to automated Interactive Voice Response polls conducted by telephone; "online" refers to polls conducted exclusively over the internet; "telephone/online" refers to polls which combine results from both telephone and online surveys, or for which respondents are initially recruited by telephone and then asked to complete an online survey. "Rolling" polls contain overlapping data from one poll to the next.)	Lead
2019 election	October 21, 2019		34.2	16.0	10.7	32.5	4.4	1.5	0.5	—N/a	4,284,338	—N/a	1.7
Leger	October 15, 2019		31	16	14	31	6	2	-	±1.79	3000	Online	0
Forum Research	October 12, 2019		33	15	10	31	7	2	2	±3 pp	1001	IVR	2
Leger	October 10, 2019		31	16	13	29	7	3	1	-	1014	Online	2
Mainstreet Research	October 6, 2019		35	17	11	27	7	3	-	±3.75 pp	685	IVR	8
Mainstreet Research	September 30, 2019		37	18	10	22	9	3	-	±3.7 pp	694	IVR	15
Nanos Research	September 30, 2019		35.3	17.0	13.3	22.0	10.1	1.8	0.6	±3.6 pp	828	telephone	13.3
Leger	September 17, 2019		36	21	7	22	10	3	1	±3.9 pp	837	Online	14
Mainstreet Research	September 13, 2019		33.0	24.8	7.9	18.6	9.5	-	-	unknown	unknown	IVR	8.2
Leger	August 29, 2019		34	23	7	20	11	4	1	±3.39 pp	837	Online	11
Forum Research	August 28, 2019		37	21	8	18	9	4		±3 pp	1219	IVR	16
Forum Research	July 24, 2019		30	28	9	15	10	4	3	±3 pp	977	IVR	2
Forum Research	June 12, 2019		32	25	9	18	10	4	2	±3 pp	1,471	IVR	7
Leger	March 11, 2019		35	26	7	17	9	4		±3.08 pp	1,014	Online	9
Leger	January 28, 2019		39	21	8	21	5	6		±3.09 pp	1,007	Online	18
CROP	June 19, 2018		42	27	10	12	8		0	—N/a	1,000	Online	15
Leger	August 24, 2017		43	16	19	16	6		2	±3 pp	1,002	Online	27
2015 election	October 19, 2015		35.7	16.7	25.4	19.4	2.2	—N/a	0.7	—N/a	4,241,487	—N/a	19

== Campaign ==
On August 9, André Parizeau, Bloc candidate for Ahuntsic-Cartierville, created attention over his past communist affiliations as Leader of the Parti communiste du Québec (PCQ). Parizeau disavowed the PCQ in order to be accepted as candidate.

On October 2, a man in Montreal, Quebec, told Jagmeet Singh NDP leader to cut off his turban to look more Canadian during a campaign stop. Singh replied that Canadians "look like all sorts of people" before walking off.

In October, the Bloc Québécois called on Quebeckers to vote for candidates "who resemble you" (" des gens qui nous ressemblent ") in the election, prompting NDP Leader Jagmeet Singh to denounce the message as unacceptable and divisive. In his closing statement during Wednesday's French-language debate, Bloc Leader Yves-François Blanchet called on voters to "opt for men and women who resemble you, who share your values, who share your concerns and who work for your interests, and only for the interests of Quebeckers." The Bloc has said the comment has nothing to do with someone's background or religion but with Québécois values. During the English debate, Blanchet called the translation of his words dishonest and mentioned that the same words were used by Igniatieff in 2011 and Mulcair in 2015.

On October 10, Le Journal de Montréal discovered that four BQ candidates had made anti-Islam and racist social media posts. A Bloc spokeswoman said it was up to Quebeckers to judge its candidates' social-media posts. The comments were condemned by Elizabeth May, Jagmeet Singh, Mélanie Joly and Françoise David. Later, the candidates all posted the same apology on their respective social media accounts and Yves-François Blanchet apologized for his candidates' Islamophobic and racist social media posts.

On October 13, Blanchet announced that they will not support a coalition or a party in a minority scenario. The Bloc will go issue by issue and support what is best for Quebec.

Law 21 was debated in the 2019 federal election. Bloc Quebecois leader Yves-Francois Blanchet stated this was a provincial matter and not relevant to the federal government's jurisdiction but did campaign in favour of Law 21. Although Trudeau initially spoke out against the idea of the bill in 2017, he did not take any actual action to prevent the bill from passing. During his election campaign in 2019, he avoided the topic as much as possible in order to maintain popularity in the polls within Quebec. The consensus among the 2019 candidates was that the bill was a provincial issue and they would not pursue action at a federal level if elected. Including NDP leader Jagmeet Singh who would personally be affected by the bill while in Quebec.

During the 2019 election, in Quebec the Conservative party campaign signs had a picture of the candidate with a Quebec flag. in 2015 the conservatives signs had both the Quebec flag and the Canadian flag. No other canadian province had signs of a candidate with a flag in the background.

Premier of Quebec François Legault said Coalition Avenir Québec MNAs were not allowed to give out endorsements.

Le Devoir done a Joint Liberal/BQ endorsement.

== Results ==
The NDP lost all but one of its seats in Quebec, it was suggested that Jagmeet Singh's Sikhism may have been negatively received by voters in the context of the Quebec ban on religious symbols. It was considered the end of the 2011 "Orange Crush" under Jack Layton.

=== Summary ===
Quebec summary seat results in the 2019 Canadian federal election
Party	Votes	Vote %	Vote +/-	Seats	Seat +/-
Liberal	1,468,603	34.3%	▼1.4pp	35 / 78 (45%)	▼5
Bloc Québécois	1,387,030	32.4%	▲13.1pp	32 / 78 (41%)	▲22
Conservative	684,661	16.0%	▼0.7pp	10 / 78 (13%)	▼1
New Democratic	464,414	10.8%	▼14.6pp	1 / 78 (1%)	▼13
Green	193,420	4.5%	▲2.2pp	0 / 78 (0%)	0 (Note: Does not include Pierre Nantel, who sat as an independent at the dissolution of Parliament, but ran as a Green Party candidate in the 2019 election)
People's	62,951	1.5%	▲1.5pp	0 / 78 (0%)	▼1
Independent	8,458	0.2%	pp	0 / 78 (0%)	▼1 (Note: Includes Pierre Nantel, who sat as an independent at the dissolution of Parliament, but ran as a Green Party candidate in the 2019 election)
Other	14,801	0.3%	pp	0 / 78 (0%)	0
Total	4,284,338	100%	–	78 / 78 (100%)	▲1 (Note: 1 seat was vacant at the dissolution of Parliament)
Seat apportionment diagram:

=== Comparison with national results ===
Results by party
Party	Popular vote %			Seats in caucus
Party	QC	Natl. avg.	diff.	Seats in caucus
Liberal	34.3	33.1	+1.2	35 / 157 (22%)
Bloc Québécois	32.4	7.6	+24.8	32 / 32 (100%)
Conservative	16.0	34.3	-18.3	10 / 121 (8%)
New Democratic	10.8	16.0	-5.2	1 / 24 (4%)
Green	4.5	6.5	-2.0	0 / 3 (0%)
People's	1.5	1.6	-0.1	no caucus
Total	–	–	–	78 / 338 (23%)

== Student vote results ==
Student votes are mock elections that run parallel to actual elections, in which students not of voting age participate. They are administered by Student Vote Canada. These are for educational purposes and do not count towards the results.

Summary of the 2019 Canadian Student Vote in Quebec
Party	Leader	Seats			Popular vote		
Party	Leader	Elected	%	Δ	Votes	%	Δ (pp)
Liberal	Justin Trudeau	34	43.03	▼17	30,170	27.65	▼9.61
New Democratic	Jagmeet Singh	22	27.85	▲3	26,440	24.23	▲0.44
Bloc Québécois	Yves-François Blanchet	12	15.19	▲12	16,181	14.83	▲3.34
Conservative	Andrew Scheer	8	10.13	0	11,110	10.18	▼3.90
Green	Elizabeth May	3	3.80	▲2	18,062	16.55	▲6.59
Other		0	0	0	4,051	3.71	▲0.28
People's	Maxime Bernier	0	0	0	3,098	2.84	▲2.84
Total		78	100.00	0	109,112	100.00	–
Source: Student Vote Canada
