= 2019 Bloc Québécois leadership election =

- January 17, 2019
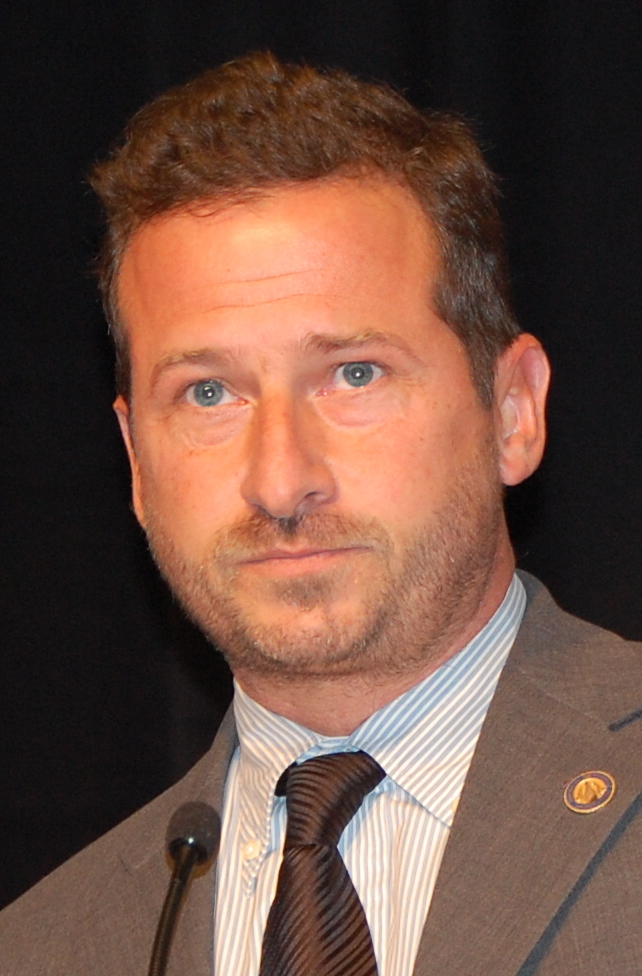
Candidate	Yves-François Blanchet
Votes	Acclaimed
Leader before election
Mario Beaulieu (interim)
Elected Leader
Yves-François Blanchet

Bloc Québécois leadership election
- Date: January 17, 2019
- Resigning leader: Martine Ouellet
- Won by: Yves-François Blanchet

The 2019 Bloc Québécois leadership election was initiated by the resignation of party leader Martine Ouellet in June 2018. While originally scheduled to be held on February 24, 2019 on a one member, one vote basis, Yves-François Blanchet, as the only candidate in the race following the nomination deadline of January 15, 2019, was officially acclaimed Leader of the Bloc Québécois on January 17, 2019.

== Background ==
Ouellet got 32% support from a confidence vote of party members. She resigned on June 11, 2018. Seven out of ten Bloc Québécois caucus members left on February 28, 2018 and formed Québec debout, which was announced on May 9, 2018. On September 17, 2018, the party's five MPs rejoined the Bloc Québécois caucus.

On June 13, 2018, Mario Beaulieu, MP for La Pointe-de-l'Île and president of the BQ since 2014, was appointed interim leader of the Bloc Québécois.

== Timeline ==
- June 4, 2018 – leader Martine Ouellet receives only 32% support in a party confidence vote.
- June 11, 2018 – Ouellet resigns.
- June 13, 2018 – Former leader Mario Beaulieu is chosen interim leader.
- January 15, 2019 – deadline for leadership candidates to file their nominations.
- January 17, 2019 – Yves-François Blanchet acclaimed as leader.

== Candidates ==
=== Declared ===
- Yves-François Blanchet, former Quebec Minister of Sustainable Development, Environment, Wildlife and Parks (2012–2014) and MNA for Johnson (2012–2014) and Drummond (2008–2012). Declared candidacy November 26, 2018. Endorsed by nine of the Bloc's ten MPs, all but Terrebonne MP Michel Boudrias, including former interim leader Rhéal Fortin, former permanent/current interim leader Mario Beaulieu, and Louis Plamondon, the Dean of the House.

=== Failed to qualify ===
- Christian Hébert, businessman, owner of the food company Domaine Hébert in Deschambault and 2018 Parti Québécois candidate in Portneuf. Hébert had announced his candidacy, though was not in the race by the nomination deadline of January 15, 2019, and it's unclear whether he withdrew or failed to qualify.
- Jean-Jacques Nantel, an engineer, attempted to join the race though did not meet the party's criteria.

=== Declined ===
- Jean-Martin Aussant, former leader of Option nationale (2011–2013) and MNA for Nicolet-Yamaska (2008–2012)
- Xavier Barsalou-Duval, MP for Pierre-Boucher—Les Patriotes—Verchères (2015–present)
- Michel Boudrias, MP for Terrebonne (2015–2021)
- Rhéal Fortin, MP for Rivière-du-Nord (2015–present), interim leader of the BQ (2015–2017), leader of Québec debout (2018)
- Marilène Gill, MP for Manicouagan (2015–2025)
- Jean-François Lisée, former leader of the Parti Québécois (2016–2018), Quebec Minister of International Relations, the Francophonie, External Trade (2012–2014), and MNA for Rosemont (2012–2018)
- Simon Marcil, MP for Mirabel (2015–2021)
- Monique Pauzé, MP for Repentigny (2015–2025)
- Louis Plamondon, MP for Bécancour—Nicolet—Saurel (2015–2025), Bas-Richelieu—Nicolet—Bécancour (2000–2015), Richelieu (1984–2000), Bloc Québécois House Leader (1992–1993, 2011–2013, 2014–2015)
- Gabriel Ste-Marie, MP for Joliette (2015–2025)
- Luc Thériault, MP for Montcalm (2015–present)
