= 2011 Canadian federal election in Quebec =

- May 2, 2011

All 75 Quebec seats in the House of Commons of Canada
- Opinion polls
- Registered: 6,130,307
- Turnout: 3,801,690 (62%)
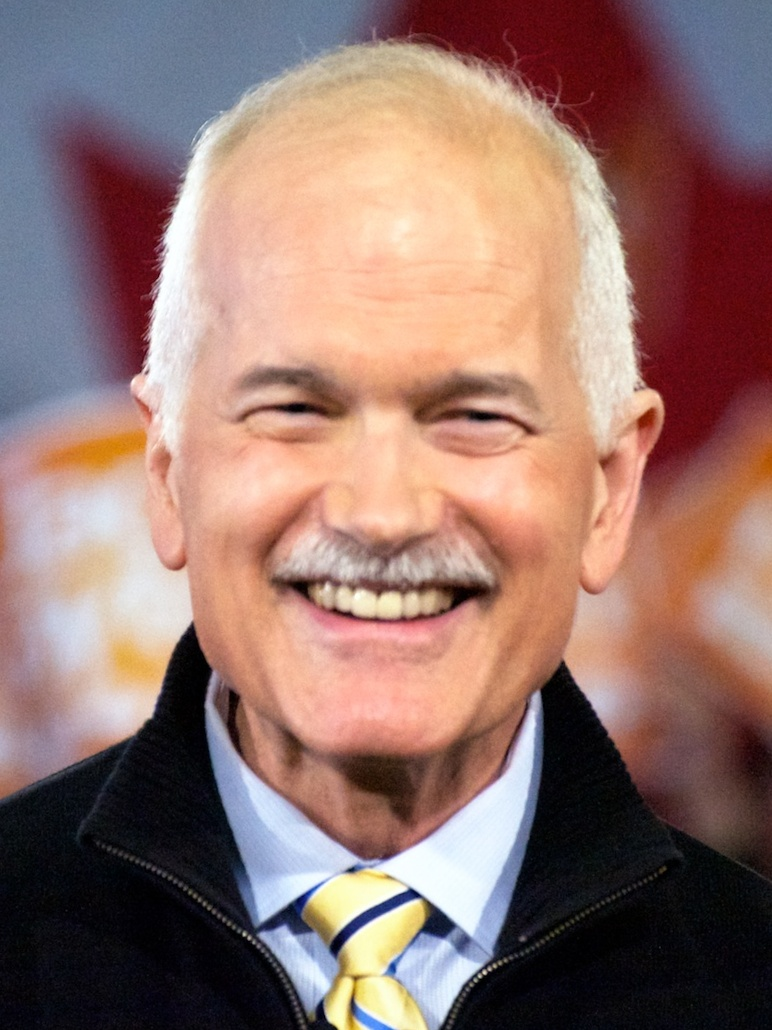

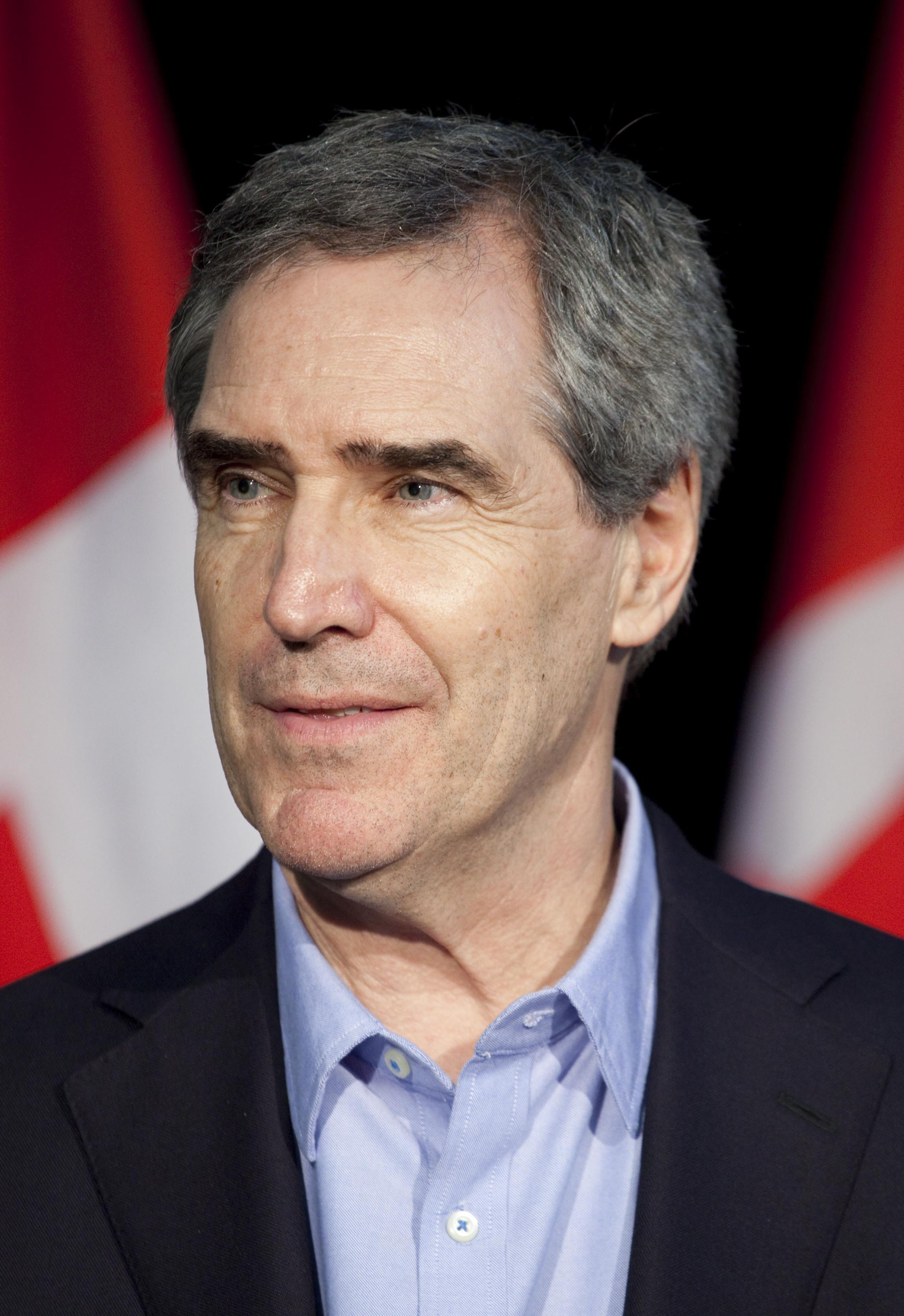

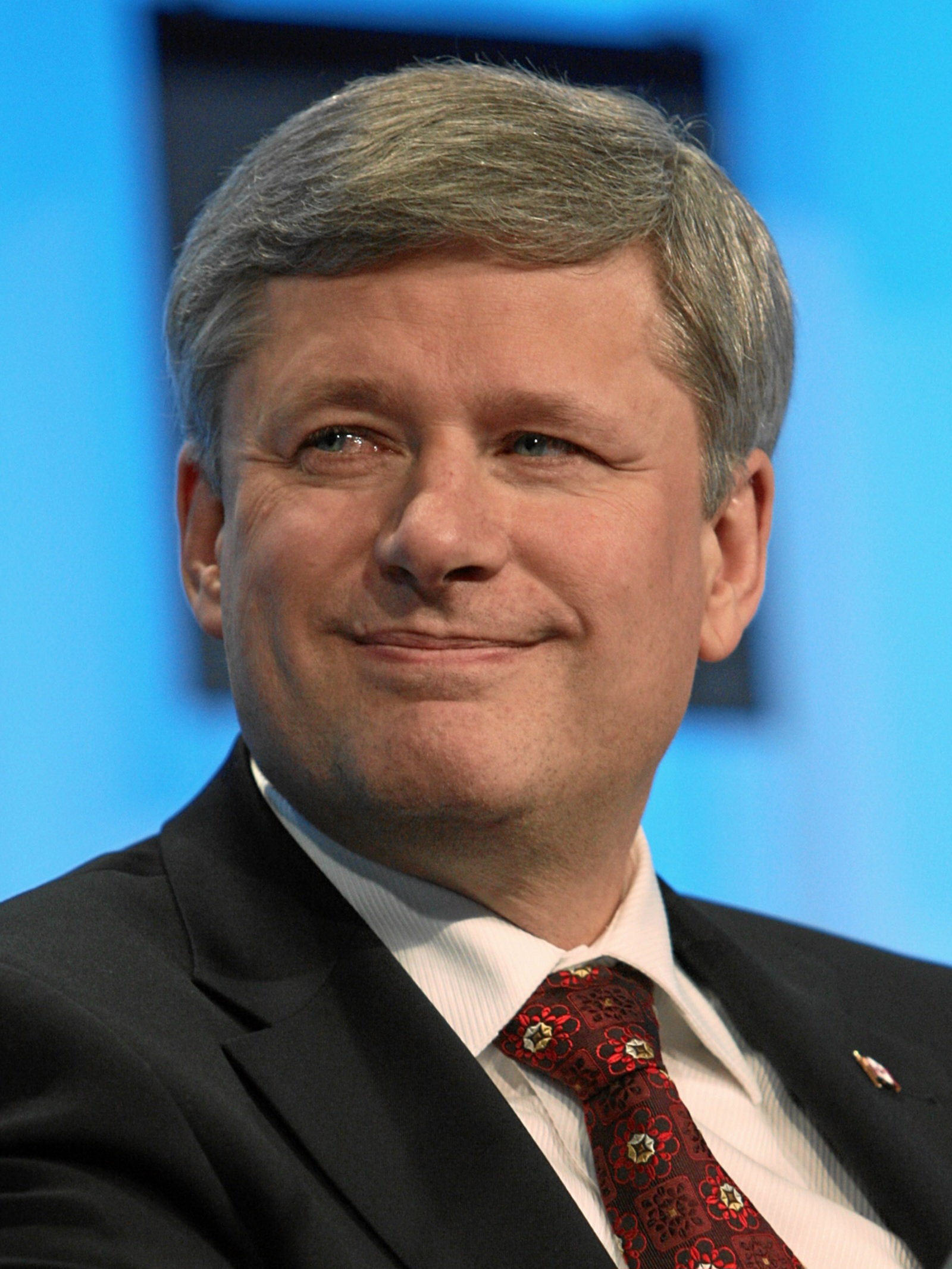

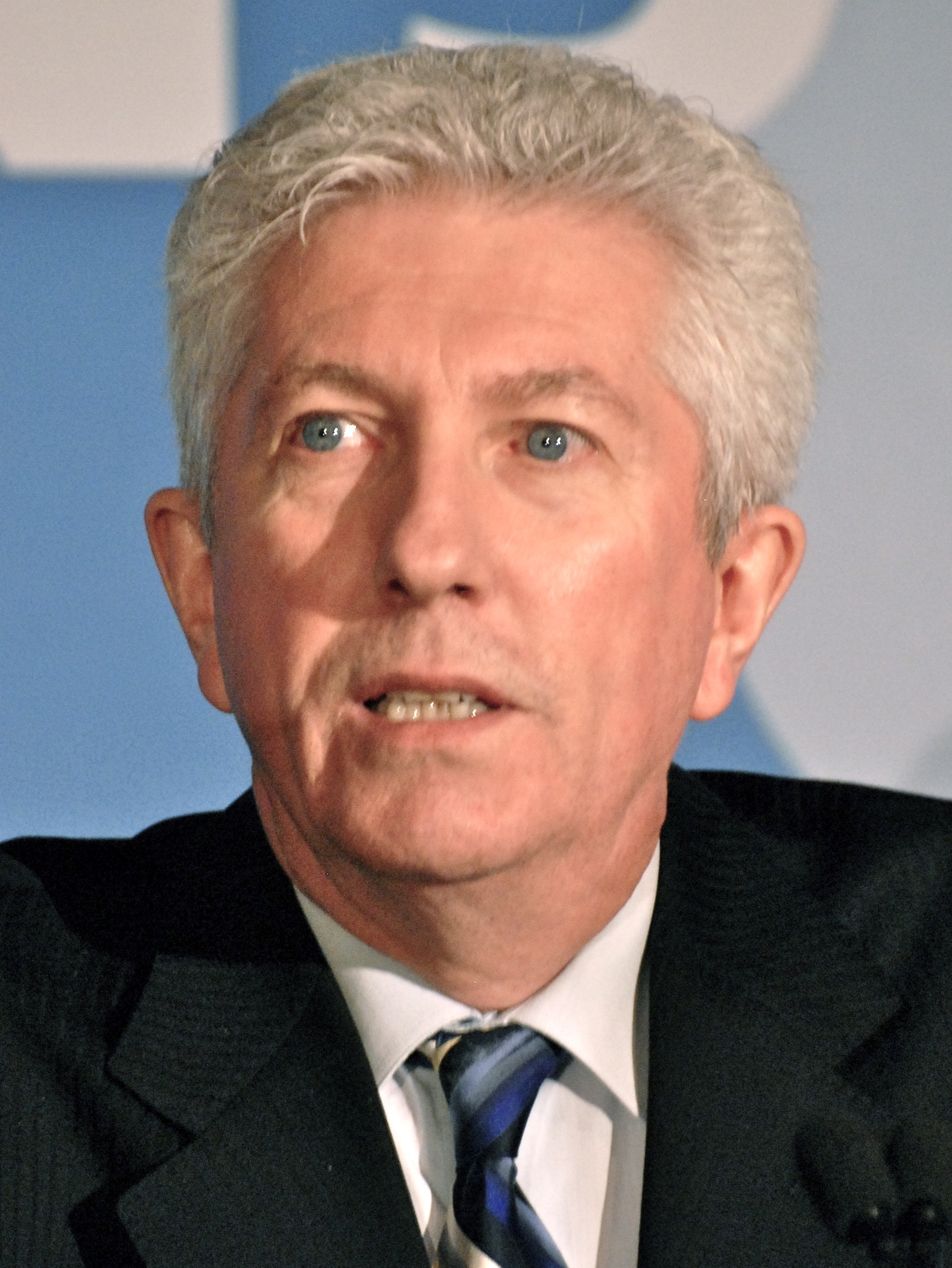
	First party	Second party
Leader	Jack Layton	Michael Ignatieff
Party	New Democratic	Liberal
Leader since	January 25, 2003	May 2, 2009
Last election	1 seats, 12.2%	14 seats, 23.8%
Seats before	1	14
Seats won	59	7
Seat change	▲58	▼7
Popular vote	1,630,865	538 447
Percentage	42.9%	14.2%
Swing	▲30.7 pp	▼9.6 pp
	Third party	Fourth party
Leader	Stephen Harper	Gilles Duceppe
Party	Conservative	Bloc Québécois
Leader since	March 20, 2004	March 15, 1997
Last election	10 seats, 21.7%	49 seats, 38.1%
Seats before	11	47
Seats won	5	4
Seat change	▼6	▼43
Popular vote	627 961	891,425
Percentage	16.5%	23.4%
Swing	▼5.2 pp	▼14.7 pp
Prime Minister before election
Stephen Harper
Conservative
Prime Minister after election
Stephen Harper
Conservative

In the 2011 Canadian federal election, there were 75 members of Parliament elected to the House of Commons from the province of Quebec, making up 24.4% of all members of the House.

== Background ==
=== Timeline ===
Changes in Quebec seats held (2008–2011)
Seat	Before				Change		
Seat	Date	Member	Party	Reason	Date	Member	Party
Montmagny—L'Islet—Kamouraska—Rivière-du-Loup	May 21, 2009	Paul Crête	█ Bloc Québécois	Resigned to run in provincial Rivière-du-Loup by-election.	November 9, 2009	Bernard Généreux	█ Conservative
Hochelaga	September 16, 2009	Réal Ménard	█ Bloc Québécois	Resigned to run in Montreal municipal election.	November 9, 2009	Daniel Paillé	█ Bloc Québécois
Haute-Gaspésie—La Mitis—Matane—Matapédia	October 22, 2010	Jean-Yves Roy	█ Bloc Québécois	Resigned due to health issues			█ Vacant

== Opinion Polling ==
=== Predictions ===
Opinion polling the election campaign

Opinion polling from 2008 to 2011

== Results ==
=== Summary ===
This election saw a massive political realignment for federal politics in Quebec. The NDP greatly increased their vote and seat share. Obtaining 59 seats and 42.9% the popular vote. The Liberal party declined to 7 seats and 14.2% of the vote. The Conservatives also moderately declined to 5 seats and 16.5%, this was the lowest seat total that a party has ever received in Quebec, while still gaining a majority government nationally. The Bloc Quebecois saw their support collapse, falling to just 4 seats and 23.4% of the popular vote, with longtime leader Gilles Duceppe losing his own seat. This caused the party to enter a wilderness period that it only recovered from in 2019. The Green party won no seats and got 2.1% of the vote. Independents and smaller parties received 0.6% and 0.2% of the vote respectively.

Quebec summary seat results in the 2011 Canadian federal election
Party	Votes	Vote %	Vote +/-	Seats	Seat +/-
New Democratic	1 630 865	42.9%	▲30.7pp	59 / 75 (79%)	▲58
Liberal	538 447	14.2%	▼9.6pp	7 / 75 (9%)	▼7
Conservative	627 961	16.5%	▼5.2pp	5 / 75 (7%)	▼6
Bloc Québécois	891 425	23.4%	▼14.7pp	4 / 75 (5%)	▼43
Green	80 402	2.1%	▼1.4pp	0 / 75 (0%)	0
Independent	23,819	0.6%	pp	0 / 75 (0%)	▼1
Other	8,771	0.2%	pp	0 / 75 (0%)	0
Total	3,801,690	100%	–	75 / 75 (100%)	▲1 (Note: 1 seat was vacant at the dissolution of Parliament)
Seat apportionment diagram:

=== Comparison with national results ===
Results by party
Party	Popular vote %			Seats in caucus
Party	QC	Natl. avg.	diff.	Seats in caucus
New Democratic	42.9	30.6	+12.6	59 / 103 (57%)
Liberal	14.2	18.9	-4.7	7 / 34 (21%)
Conservative	16.5	39.6	-23.1	5 / 166 (3%)
Bloc Québécois	23.4	6.0	+17.4	4 / 4 (100%)
Green	2.1	3.9	-1.8	0 / 1 (0%)
Total	–	–	–	75 / 308 (24%)

=== New Democratic Party surge ===
The 2011 election saw the NDP massively increase their support, coming in second place nationally for the first time in their history. The surge in support began in Quebec, a province where the party had only ever won two seats before (Chambly in a 1990 by-election, and Outremont in a 2007 by-election), and only won 12.2% of the vote and a single seat in the previous election. The NDP surprised many observers by surpassing the Bloc in Quebec, which had dominated federal elections in Quebec since its formation in the early 1990s. The NDP surge became the dominant narrative of the last week of the campaign, as other parties turned their attacks on the party. Ruth Ellen Brosseau, the NDP candidate in Berthier—Maskinongé, won despite not running a campaign, barely speaking French at this time and being on holiday in Las Vegas at the time of the election. The NDP's rise in popularity was nicknamed Orange Crush, an allusion to the soft drink with the same name and the party's colour. It was also nicknamed the Orange Wave.

== See also ==
- Political realignment
- 2012 Quebec general election
