= Jean-Denis Garon =

Canadian economist and politician

Jean-Denis Garon MP
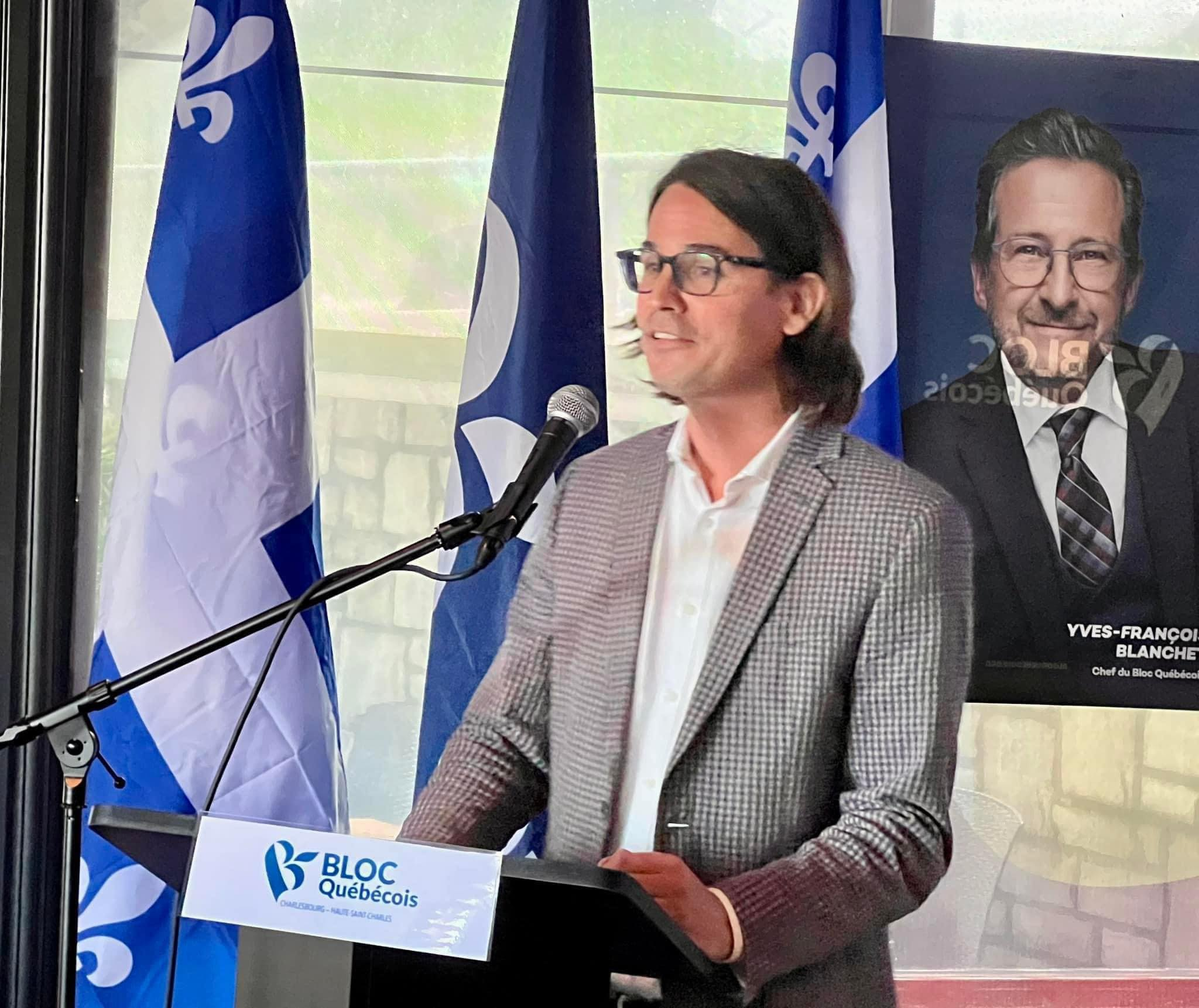

Member of Parliament for Mirabel
- Incumbent
- Assumed office September 20, 2021
- Preceded by: Simon Marcil

Personal details
- Born: 1 November 1982 (age 43)
- Party: Bloc Québécois
- Occupation: Politician, economist

Jean-Denis Garon is a Canadian politician who was elected to represent the riding of Mirabel in the House of Commons of Canada in the 2021 Canadian federal election.

An economist, Garon is a professor at UQAM's School of Management Sciences.

He served as the critic of national revenue, green finance and green equalization in the Bloc Québécois Shadow Cabinet of the 44th Parliament of Canada.

He was elected vice chair of the Canadian House of Commons Standing Committee on Finance in the 45th Canadian Parliament in 2025.

At the time of the 2025 Canadian federal election, he lived in Montreal.

== Electoral record ==
2025 Canadian federal election: Mirabel
| Party | Candidate | Votes | % | ±% | Expenditures |
|---|---|---|---|---|---|
| Bloc Québécois | Jean-Denis Garon | 22,494 | 39.91 | –5.91 | $19,891.20 |
| Liberal | Robert Fleming | 18,796 | 33.35 | +8.96 | $15,420.25 |
| Conservative | Serge Dubord | 12,544 | 22.26 | +8.95 | none listed |
| New Democratic | Albert Batten | 1,333 | 2.37 | –6.25 | $2,240.86 |
| Green | Mario Guay | 792 | 1.41 | –0.76 | $0.00 |
| People's | Christian Montpetit | 400 | 0.71 | –3.09 | $4,996.24 |
| Total valid votes | | 56,359 | 98.45 | +0.54 | $129,137.68 |
| Total rejected ballots | | 885 | 1.55 | –0.54 | |
| Turnout | | 57,244 | 69.29 | +5.16 | |
| Eligible voters | | 82,613 | | | |
| Bloc Québécois notional hold | | Swing | | –7.44 | |
Source: Elections Canada
