= Mirabel (federal electoral district) =

Federal electoral district in Quebec, Canada

Quebec electoral district
- Interactive map of riding boundaries from the 2025 federal election

Federal electoral district
- Legislature: House of Commons
MP
Jean-Denis Garon
Bloc Québécois
- District created: 2013
- First contested: 2015
- Last contested: 2025
- District webpage: profile, map

Demographics
- Population (2016): 117,652
- Electors (2019): 96,468
- Area (km²): 868
- Pop. density (per km²): 135.5
- Census division(s): Deux-Montagnes, Mirabel, La Rivière-du-Nord, Thérèse-De Blainville
- Census subdivision(s): Mirabel, Sainte-Marthe-sur-le-Lac, Saint-Joseph-du-Lac, Pointe-Calumet, Oka, Saint-Placide, Kanesatake

Mirabel (French pronunciation: [miʁabɛl]) is a federal electoral district in Quebec.

== History ==
The riding was created by the 2012 federal electoral boundaries redistribution out of parts of Argenteuil—Papineau—Mirabel, Rivière-des-Mille-Îles, Terrebonne—Blainville and Rivière-du-Nord. It was legally defined in the 2013 representation order, and came into effect upon the call of the 2015 Canadian federal election.

Following the 2022 Canadian federal electoral redistribution, the riding lost Saint-Colomban to Les Pays-d'en-Haut, and Sainte-Anne-des-Plaines to Rivière-du-Nord, while it gained the territory west of Montée Laurin, south of Ch. de la Rivière-Sud and west of Boul. Industriel in Saint-Eustache from Rivière-des-Mille-Îles.

== Demographics ==
According to the 2021 Canadian census, 2023 representation order

Racial groups: 90.8% White, 2.3% Black, 2.2% Indigenous, 1.7% Arab, 1.0% Latin American
Languages: 91.4% French, 4.8% English, 1.1% Spanish
Religions: 63.9% Christian (56.0% Catholic, 1.0% Orthodox, 6.9% Other), 2.3% Muslim, 33.1% None
Median income: $46,000 (2020)
Average income: $53,250 (2020)

== Members of Parliament ==
This riding has elected the following members of Parliament:

Parliament	Years	Member	Party
Mirabel; Riding created from Argenteuil—Papineau—Mirabel, Rivière-des-Mille-Îles, Rivière-du-Nord and Terrebonne—Blainville
42nd	2015–2018	Simon Marcil	Bloc Québécois
42nd	2018–2018	Simon Marcil	Groupe parlementaire québécois
42nd	2018–2019	Simon Marcil	Bloc Québécois
43rd	2019–2021	Simon Marcil	Bloc Québécois
44th	2021–2025	Jean-Denis Garon	Bloc Québécois
45th	2025–present	Jean-Denis Garon	Bloc Québécois

== Election results ==
View source data.
Graph of election results in Mirabel (minor parties that never got 2% of the vote or didn't run consistently are omitted)

2025 Canadian federal election
Party	Candidate	Votes	%	±%	Expenditures
Bloc Québécois	Jean-Denis Garon	22,494	39.91	–5.91	$19,891.20
Liberal	Robert Fleming	18,796	33.35	+8.96	$15,420.25
Conservative	Serge Dubord	12,544	22.26	+8.95	none listed
New Democratic	Albert Batten	1,333	2.37	–6.25	$2,240.86
Green	Mario Guay	792	1.41	–0.76	$0.00
People's	Christian Montpetit	400	0.71	–3.09	$4,996.24
Total valid votes		56,359	98.45	+0.54	$129,137.68
Total rejected ballots		885	1.55	–0.54	
Turnout		57,244	69.29	+5.16	
Eligible voters		82,613			
Bloc Québécois notional hold		Swing		–7.44	
Source: Elections Canada

2021 federal election redistributed results
Party	Vote	%
Bloc Québécois	22,259	45.82
Liberal	11,847	24.39
Conservative	6,466	13.31
New Democratic	4,185	8.61
People's	1,846	3.80
Green	1,051	2.16
Free	924	1.90
Free	924	1.90
Patriote	1	0.00
Pour l'Indépendance du Québec	1	0.00
Total valid votes	48,580	97.92
Rejected ballots	1,033	2.08
Registered voters/ estimated turnout	77,358	64.13

2021 Canadian federal election
Party	Candidate	Votes	%	±%	Expenditures
Bloc Québécois	Jean-Denis Garon	29,376	46.5	-4.6	$12,108.43
Liberal	François Loza	14,842	23.5	-1.4	$6,445.66
Conservative	Catherine Lefebvre	8,510	13.5	+4.4	$5,753.02
New Democratic	Benoit Bourassa	5,221	8.3	+0.3	$492.78
People's	Christian Montpetit	2,569	4.1	+3.1	$5,753.02
Green	Mario Guay	1,412	2.2	-3.2	$176.07
Free	Ariane Croteau	1,182	1.9	N/A	$1.73
Total valid votes/expense limit		63,112	97.8	–	$127,885.59
Total rejected ballots		1,402	2.2		
Turnout		64,514	63.7		
Registered voters		101,340			
Bloc Québécois hold		Swing		-1.6	
Source: Elections Canada

2019 Canadian federal election
Party	Candidate	Votes	%	±%	Expenditures
Bloc Québécois	Simon Marcil	33,219	51.08	+19.59	$7,193.50
Liberal	Karl Trudel	16,162	24.85	-1.26	$36,834.25
Conservative	François Desrochers	5,940	9.13	-1.00	none listed
New Democratic	Anne-Marie Saint-Germain	5,219	8.03	-22.05	$902.88
Green	Julie Tremblay	3,517	5.41	+3.22	$10,545.78
People's	Christian Montpetit	641	0.99		none listed
Indépendance du Québec	Pietro Biacchi	332	0.51		$0.00
Total valid votes/expense limit		65,030	98.06		
Total rejected ballots		1,286	1.94	-0.00	
Turnout		66,316	68.47	-0.43	
Eligible voters		96,848			
Bloc Québécois hold		Swing		+10.41	
Source: Elections Canada

2015 Canadian federal election
Party	Candidate	Votes	%	±%	Expenditures
Bloc Québécois	Simon Marcil	18,710	31.49	+0.48	$14,070.30
New Democratic	Mylène Freeman	17,873	30.08	-19.47	$52,822.53
Liberal	Karl Trudel	15,514	26.11	+18.36	$16,340.47
Conservative	Gordon Ferguson	6,020	10.13	+0.91	$4,496.74
Green	Jocelyn Gifford	1,301	2.19	+0.17	–
Total valid votes/expense limit		59,418	98.06		$227,491.40
Total rejected ballots		1,178	1.94	–	
Turnout		60,596	68.91	–	
Eligible voters		87,938			
Bloc Québécois gain from New Democratic		Swing		+9.98	
Source: Elections Canada

2011 federal election redistributed results
Party	Vote	%
New Democratic	23,527	49.55
Bloc Québécois	14,727	31.01
Conservative	4,380	9.22
Liberal	3,679	7.75
Green	958	2.02
Others	213	0.45

== See also ==
- List of Canadian electoral districts
- Historical federal electoral districts of Canada
