= Québec debout =

Canadian political party (2018)

- Founded: February 28, 2018 (As the Groupe parlementaire québécois); June 6, 2018 (As Québec debout)
- Dissolved: September 17, 2018
- Split from: Bloc Québécois
- Merged into: Bloc Québécois
- Ideology: Regionalism; Quebec nationalism
- Colours: Light blue

Québec debout (French pronunciation: [kebɛk dəbu]), sometimes styled Québec Debout (transl. Stand Up, Quebec or Rise Up, Quebec), formerly the Groupe parlementaire québécois (transl. Quebec Parliamentary Group) was a Quebec-based parliamentary group in the House of Commons of Canada during the 42nd Canadian Parliament which consisted of members who resigned from the Bloc Québécois caucus. The group did not have a formal leader, but Rhéal Fortin acted as the group's spokesperson. The group was dissolved on September 17, 2018 with all remaining Québec debout MPs rejoining the Bloc Québécois caucus.

== Formation of the Groupe parlementaire québécois ==
The Groupe parlementaire québécois (GPQ) was formed on February 28, 2018 by seven Members of Parliament (MPs) who resigned from the caucus of the Bloc Québécois (BQ) due to their opposition to the leadership of Martine Ouellet, as well as political differences with her strategy of emphasizing the party's stance regarding active advocacy for Quebec sovereignty rather than a pragmatic approach that focuses on the practical interests of Quebec.

While the seven MPs left the BQ parliamentary caucus, they initially remained members of the BQ party itself and had expressed the desire to remain so. The BQ party executive, in a meeting one week after the group's formation, ruled that the seven defecting MPs would not be expelled from the party for leaving the caucus, and would be allowed to rejoin the caucus in the future.

== Québec debout, proposed new party ==
On May 1, 2018, the seven MPs announced that they were severing all ties with the BQ and considering founding a new political party. The GPQ members announced on May 9, 2018 that their new party would be registered under the name "Québec debout" and would no longer include Quebec sovereignty in its platform.

Following Ouellet's decision to resign after losing a leadership review, Terrebonne MP Michel Boudrias and Mirabel MP Simon Marcil announced that they would rejoin the Bloc Québécois caucus. The same day, citing the Bloc's vote to focus exclusively on Quebec sovereignty, Québec debout spokesman Rhéal Fortin announced that he and the party's other four MPs would not rejoin the Bloc Québécois.

The five Groupe parlementaire québécois MPs were formally redesignated as Québec debout MPs in the House of Commons on June 6, 2018. On September 17, 2018, they rejoined the Bloc Québécois caucus.
