= Bloc Québécois =

Federal political party in Canada

- Abbreviation: BQ; Bloc
- Leader: Yves-François Blanchet
- President: Yves Perron
- House Leader: Christine Normandin
- Founder: Lucien Bouchard
- Founded: 15 June 1991; 35 years ago
- Headquarters: 6900 Rue St-Hubert, Montreal, Quebec; H2S 2M6
- Youth wing: Forum jeunesse du Bloc Québécois
- Membership (2014): 23,000
- Ideology: Quebec nationalism; Social democracy; Quebec sovereigntism; Regionalism
- Political position: Centre-left
- Colours: Light blue
- Slogan: Je choisis le Québec ('I choose Québec') (2025)
- Senate: 0 / 105
- House of Commons: 21 / 343

Website
- www.blocquebecois.org

The Bloc Québécois (Note: Pronounced /ˈblɒk ˌkɛbəˈkwɑː/ BLOK KEB-ə-KWAH; Canadian French: [blɔk kebekwa], lit. 'Québécois [Voting] Bloc'.) (BQ or Bloc) is a federal political party in Canada devoted to Quebecois nationalism, social democracy, and the promotion of Quebecois sovereignty. The Bloc was formed in the early 1990s by Members of Parliament (MPs) who defected from the federal Progressive Conservative Party and Liberal Party during the collapse of the Meech Lake Accord. Founder Lucien Bouchard had been a cabinet minister in the federal Progressive Conservative government of Brian Mulroney.

The Bloc seeks to create the conditions necessary for the political secession of Quebec from Canada and campaigns exclusively within the province during federal elections. The party has been described as social democratic and separatist (or "sovereigntist"). The Bloc supports the Kyoto Protocol, abortion rights, LGBTQ+ rights, legalization of assisted suicide, abolition of the Canadian Senate, abolition of the monarchy, the Quebec secularism law, and supports exempting Quebec from the requirements of the Multiculturalism Act.

From the 1993 federal election until 2011, the Bloc was the largest party in Quebec and either the second- or third-largest party in the House of Commons through seven straight federal elections. The 2011 election saw the party win just four seats and lose official party status after a wave of support for the New Democratic Party. By 2014, the party had been reduced to two seats because of resignations and expulsions. In the 2015 election, the Bloc won 10 seats, even though the party's leader Gilles Duceppe failed to win a seat. In the 2019 election, the party won 32 seats, regaining official party status as a result. In the 2021 election, their seat count remained the same as the 2019 election. In the 2025 election, the party saw a decline in seat and vote share after increased support for the Liberal Party under Mark Carney. Due to the 2019, 2021, and 2025 elections resulting in a series of Liberal minority governments, the Bloc shared the balance of power with the New Democratic Party.

The Bloc has strong informal ties to the Parti Québécois (PQ, whose members are known as Péquistes), a provincial party that advocates for the secession of Quebec from Canada and its independence; however, the two parties are not linked organizationally. As with its provincial counterpart, the Bloc Québécois has been supported by a wide range of voters in Quebec, from sections of organized labour to more conservative rural voters. Members and supporters are known in French as bloquistes (Canadian French: [blɔkist]).

== Positions and ideologies ==
An incomplete list of Bloc Québécois political positions. Among other things the Bloc Québécois has advocated:

- Quebec sovereignty, up to independence, specifically repeal of the Clarity Act and opposition to the Muskrat Falls hydroelectric project.
- Supporting the Kyoto Protocol.
- Abortion rights.
- LGBTQ+ rights.
- Legalization of assisted suicide.
- Abolition of the Canadian Senate.
- Abolition of the monarchy.
- Lowering the voting age to 16.
- Support for the Quebec Secularism law, in which government bans individual civil servants from wearing religious attires, largely affecting Muslim women and Sikh men.
- Exemption of Quebec from the requirements of the Multiculturalism Act.

During the 2015 Canadian federal election, the Bloc Québécois supported banning the face covering during the citizenship ceremony and voting, aimed at Muslim women who wear the niqab.

== History ==
=== Origins ===
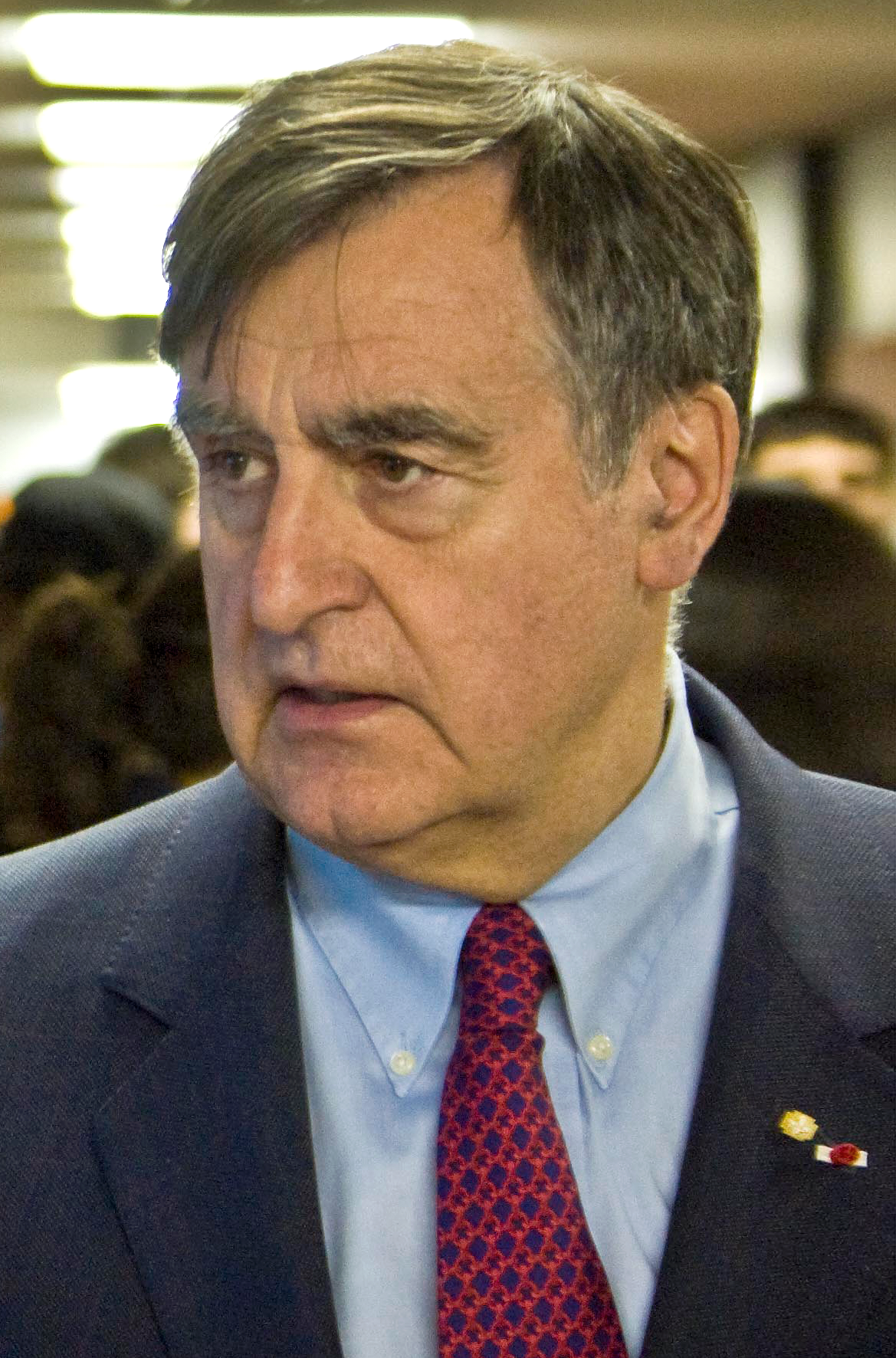
Lucien Bouchard became founding leader of the Bloc Québécois in 1990.

The Bloc Québécois was formed in 1990 as an informal coalition of Progressive Conservative and Liberal Members of Parliament from Quebec, who left their original parties around the time of the defeat of the Meech Lake Accord. The party was intended to be temporary and was given the goal of the promotion of sovereignty at the federal level. The party aimed to disband following a successful referendum on secession from Canada. As with most parties, it has gained and lost prominent supporters over the years.

The initial coalition that led to the Bloc was headed by Lucien Bouchard, who had been federal Minister of the Environment in the Progressive Conservative government of Brian Mulroney. Bouchard abandoned the government in May 1990 in response to the report of a commission headed by Jean Charest that suggested changes to the Meech Lake Accord. Bouchard felt the recommendations for change undermined the objectives and spirit of the accord. According to The Secret Mulroney Tapes he was fired by Prime Minister Mulroney. Bouchard was joined by five of his fellow Tories (Nic Leblanc, Louis Plamondon, Benoît Tremblay, Gilbert Chartrand, and François Gérin), along with two Liberals (Gilles Rocheleau and Jean Lapierre). The first Bloquiste candidate to be elected was Gilles Duceppe, then a union organizer, in a by-election for the Montreal riding of Laurier—Sainte-Marie on 13 August 1990. He ran as an independent, since the Bloc had not been registered as a federal party.

=== First election and Official Opposition ===
Logo of the Bloc Québécois in the 1990s to 2000s

In the 1993 federal election, the Bloc won 54 seats (out of 75) in Quebec, sweeping nearly all of the francophone ridings. Because the opposition vote in the rest of Canada was split between the Reform Party, the Progressive Conservative Party, and the New Democratic Party, the Bloc narrowly won the second largest number of seats in the House of Commons, and therefore became the official opposition. While Reform finished second in the national popular vote, the Bloc's heavy concentration of support in Quebec was slightly larger than Reform's concentration in the West.

Soon after the 35th Parliament convened, Bouchard announced that Bloquiste MPs would only speak French on the floor of the House of Commons, a policy that remains in force to this day. This was out of necessity; although Bouchard and most of the Bloc's founding members were fluently bilingual in French and English, Bouchard had discovered that most of his large caucus could not speak English well enough to use it in debate.

The election of such a relatively large number of Bloquistes was the first of The Three Periods, a plan intended to lay out the way to sovereignty created by PQ leader Jacques Parizeau. Parizeau became Premier of Quebec in the Quebec election of 1994 (the second of the Three Periods).

Because the Bloc was the official opposition, it had considerable privileges over the other parties although all of its MPs had been elected in one province. For instance, Question Periods during the 35th Parliament were dominated by issues of national unity. However, the governing Liberals regarded Reform as their main opposition on non-Quebec matters. Also, in 1995, when Bouchard garnered an invitation to meet visiting US President Bill Clinton by virtue of being Opposition Leader, Reform leader Preston Manning was also given a meeting with Clinton in order to defuse Bouchard's separatist leverage.

=== 1995 Quebec referendum and aftermath ===
In 1995, the PQ government called the second referendum on independence in Quebec history. The Bloc entered the campaign for the Oui (Yes) side (in favour of sovereignty). The Oui side's campaign had a difficult beginning, so the leadership of the campaign was shifted from PQ leader Jacques Parizeau to Bloc leader Lucien Bouchard. Bouchard was seen as more charismatic and more moderate, and therefore more likely to attract voters.

A "tripartite agreement" mapping out the plan for accession to independence was written and signed by the leaders of the Parti Québécois, the Bloc Québécois and the Action démocratique du Québec on 12 June 1995. It revived René Lévesque's notion that the referendum should be followed by the negotiating of an association agreement between an independent Quebec and the rest of Canada. This provision was inspired by Bouchard. Parizeau had previously wanted a vote simply on independence. The difference became moot when 50.6% of voters taking part in the referendum rejected the sovereignty plan. An overwhelming "Non" vote in Montreal tipped the balance.

The day after the referendum, Parizeau announced his pending resignation as PQ leader and Premier of Quebec. Bouchard left federal politics and succeeded Parizeau in both posts on 26 January 1996.

Following Bouchard's departure from Ottawa, Michel Gauthier became leader of the Bloc. In the wake of the referendum defeat, Gauthier proved unable to hold the fractious caucus together and resigned as leader just one year later. Gilles Duceppe, who had served as interim leader between Bouchard and Gauthier, became leader of the Bloc in 1997.

=== Party under Gilles Duceppe ===
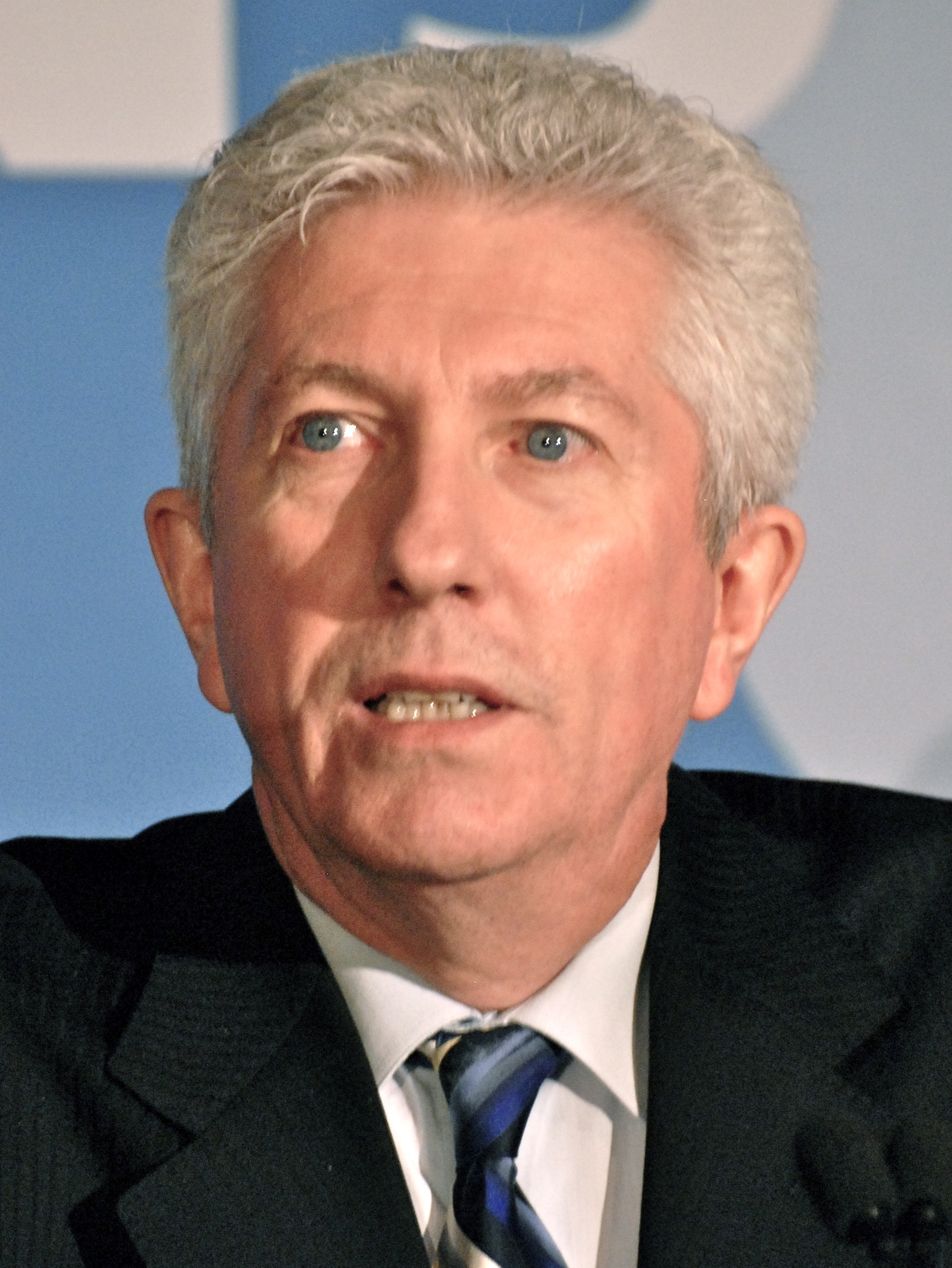
Gilles Duceppe became the first Bloc MP in 1990; he served as leader from 1997 to 2011.

In the 1997 federal election, the Bloc Québécois dropped to 44 seats, losing official opposition status to the Reform Party. The 1997–2000 term was marked by the Bloc's fight against the passage of the Clarity Act, the attempt by Canadian Prime Minister Jean Chrétien (himself a Quebecer who represented a strongly nationalist riding) and Stéphane Dion, a Quebec minister in Chrétien's cabinet, to codify the Supreme Court of Canada's 1998 decision that Quebec could not secede unilaterally.

In the 2000 election, the Bloc dropped further to 38 seats, despite polling a larger percentage of the vote than at the previous election. One factor was the forced merger of several major Quebec cities, such as Montreal, Quebec City and Hull/Gatineau. The merger was very unpopular in those areas, resulting in Liberal wins in several of the merged areas. This was still more than the number of seats the Liberals had won in Quebec. However, the Liberals won several subsequent by-elections during the life of the 37th Parliament, until the Liberals had held the majority of Quebec's seats in the Commons for the first time since the 1984 federal election. From then to the subsequent election, the Bloc continued to denounce the federal government's interventions in what the Bloc saw as exclusively provincial jurisdictions. The Bloc credits its actions for the uncovering of what has since become the sponsorship scandal.

The Bloc continued to slide in most of the 2003 opinion polls following the 2003 Quebec election which was won by the federalist Quebec Liberal Party led by Jean Charest. However, things changed during the winter of 2003. The federalist Charest government lost popularity. Then, in February 2004, the Auditor General of Canada uncovered the sponsorship scandal, suggesting illegality in the spending of federal monies in Quebec in support of Canadian unity. As well, the Liberal government of Jean Chrétien passed party financing legislation that resulted in the Bloc receiving millions of dollars in subsidies that helped to stabilize its organization.

For the 2004 election, the Bloc adopted the slogan Un parti propre au Québec, a play on words that can be translated either as "A party of Quebec's own" ("a party proper to Quebec") or as "A clean party in Quebec". The Bloc won 54 seats in the House of Commons, tying its previous record from the 1993 campaign. For the 2006 election, the Bloc used the slogan Heureusement, ici, c'est le Bloc! ("Fortunately, the Bloc is here!"). The Bloc were expected to easily win more than 60 seats at the start of the campaign, and they did in fact take six seats from the Liberals. However, the unexpected surge of the new Conservative Party of Canada in parts of Quebec, particularly in and around Quebec City, led to the Bloc losing eight seats to the Tories. Coupled with an additional loss to André Arthur, an independent candidate, the Bloc recorded a net loss of three seats.

The Conservative Party won a plurality of seats in the House of Commons, thus forming a minority government. There was persistent speculation as to the possibility of the Bloc forming alliances with other opposition parties to wrest the government away from the Conservatives. Duceppe, whose leadership was confirmed after the election, maintained that the Bloc would continue to co-operate with other opposition parties or with the government when this advantaged Quebec, but would not participate in a federal government.

Gilles Duceppe announced on 11 May 2007 that he would run for the leadership of the Parti Québécois to replace André Boisclair, who resigned on 8 May 2007, after the poor performance in the March 2007 Quebec provincial election and internal dissent forced him to step down. Duceppe announced the next day that he was withdrawing from the race, and that he would support Pauline Marois who had also announced her intention to run.

The Bloc made slight gains following the 2008 federal elections as they won 49 seats, one more than the number they had before the previous parliament was dissolved. In that election, they used the slogan "Présent pour le Québec" ("Present for Quebec"). Although they made small gains in relation to the number of seats at dissolution, they fell by 2 seats to 49 in comparison to the 51 they received in 2006. Also, the proportion of popular votes in the province was down 4 points to 38.1%, the Bloc's lowest score since 1997.

In a speech in front of his supporters following the election, BQ leader Gilles Duceppe claimed to have achieved his objectives, adding: "without the Bloc Québécois tonight, Mr. Harper would have formed a majority government".

At the end of November 2008, the Bloc indicated that it would support a possible motion of no confidence against the governing Conservatives by the two other opposition parties, and would support the resulting Liberal-NDP coalition government at least until June 2010, without actually being part of the government.

==== Coalition attempt ====
On 26 March 2011, Bloc Québécois leader Duceppe stated that Conservative leader Stephen Harper had in 2004 tried to form a coalition government with the Bloc and NDP in response to Harper's allegations that the Liberals intended to form a coalition with the Bloc and the NDP. Two months after the 2004 federal election, Stephen Harper privately met with BQ leader Gilles Duceppe and New Democratic Party leader Jack Layton in a Montreal hotel. On 9 September 2004, the three signed a letter addressed to then-Governor General Adrienne Clarkson, stating:

We respectfully point out that the opposition parties, who together constitute a majority in the House, have been in close consultation. We believe that, should a request for dissolution arise, this should give you cause, as constitutional practice has determined, to consult the opposition leaders and consider all of your options before exercising your constitutional authority.

On the same day the letter was written, the three party leaders held a joint press conference at which they expressed their intent to co-operate on changing parliamentary rules, and to request that the governor general consult with them before deciding to call an election. At the news conference, Harper said: "It is the Parliament that's supposed to run the country, not just the largest party and the single leader of that party. That's a criticism I've had and that we've had and that most Canadians have had for a long, long time now so this is an opportunity to start to change that." However, at the time, Harper and the two other opposition leaders denied trying to form a coalition government, despite the letter written to the governor general. Harper said, "This is not a coalition, but this is a co-operative effort."

One month later, on 4 October 2004, journalist Mike Duffy (later appointed as a Conservative senator by Harper in December 2008) said "It is possible that you could change prime minister without having an election", and that some Conservatives wanted Harper as prime minister. The next day, Layton walked out on talks with Harper and Duceppe, accusing them of trying to replace Paul Martin with Harper as prime minister. Both Bloc and Conservative officials denied Layton's accusations.

=== Loss of official party status ===
In the 2011 federal election, in the wake of a surge of support for the New Democratic Party, the Bloc received less than a quarter of the popular vote in Quebec (and less than 6% of the national vote). It lost 44 of the 47 seats it held at parliament's dissolution, and only added one seat, which had been vacated by a Bloc Québécois member six months prior to the election. The seats lost included that of Duceppe, who resigned as party president and leader. It also lost all but one of its seats in Montreal.

By winning only four seats, the Bloc failed to reach the minimum of 12 seats required for official party status in the House of Commons. MPs without official party status are treated as independents and must sit in the back row of the opposition benches. They are permitted just a few questions each week in question period and cannot sit as voting members on parliamentary committees.

Elected to Parliament in this election were incumbents Louis Plamondon, André Bellavance, Maria Mourani and rookie MP Jean-François Fortin. When the 41st Parliament convened on 2 June 2011, Plamondon became the Bloc's interim parliamentary leader. Vivian Barbot served as interim leader and party president following Duceppe's resignation until the party's 2011 leadership election.

The Bloc Québécois leadership election campaign to choose a permanent successor to Duceppe began on 17 September 2011. The campaign concluded on 11 December, with the election of former MP for Hochelaga Daniel Paillé as party leader. Plamondon, the longest-serving member of the Commons, served as parliamentary leader during Paillé's tenure as he did not have a seat.

On 28 February 2013, Claude Patry defected from the New Democratic Party and joined the Bloc, citing his disagreement with the New Democratic Party on the subject of Quebec sovereignty, bringing the party's total seats in Parliament up to five.

The caucus fell back to four MPs on 12 September 2013 when Mourani, the party's only remaining member from Montreal, was expelled for her comments criticizing the Parti Québécois government's proposed Charter of Quebec Values.

Paillé stepped down as leader on 16 December 2013 because of health reasons. A leadership election was held the following June.

Hardliner Mario Beaulieu, a former president of the Société Saint-Jean-Baptiste who had never been a Member of Parliament nor a member of Quebec's National Assembly, was elected party leader after running on a platform of prioritizing Quebec independence above all else. He defeated BQ Member of Parliament André Bellavance, who had campaigned on a platform of broadening the Bloc beyond being a coalition of sovereigntists and had been endorsed by the rest of the party's caucus.

On 12 August 2014, the caucus was reduced to three MPs when the Bloc's interim parliamentary leader, Jean-François Fortin, quit the party to sit as an independent saying that the Bloc Québécois he had joined no longer existed and that Beaulieu had destroyed its credibility. On 25 August 2014, former interim parliamentary leader and failed leadership contender André Bellavance also resigned, reducing the Bloc to two MPs – one of whom, Claude Patry, had announced that he would not run for re-election. On 31 December 2014, the party's vice president, Annie Lessard, resigned after a personality conflict with leader Mario Beaulieu.

==== Return and departure of Duceppe ====
With two seats left in parliament, and with the party languishing in the polls a few months before an expected election campaign, it was announced 10 June 2015 that Gilles Duceppe would be returning to lead the party into the campaign; Beaulieu would relinquish the leadership but remain party president. The party executive agreed on 9 June 2015, to split the positions of president and party leader in order to facilitate Duceppe's return. The changes were approved by the party's general council on 1 July.

Results of the 2015 Canadian federal election showing support for Bloc Québécois candidates by riding

During the 2015 federal election, the Bloc Québécois had hoped to pick up seats from the collapsing NDP vote; however, most Quebecers instead switched their allegiance to the Liberals and Conservatives rather than back to the Bloc. While the Bloc managed to win 10 seats, more than twice that of the previous election, it was not enough to gain official party status. The party's share of the popular vote in Quebec fell to 19%, its lowest point up until that time. As in 2011, Duceppe failed to win his own seat, and resigned again as party leader.

=== Party under Martine Ouellet (2017–2018) ===
The party was led on an interim basis by Rhéal Fortin until the Bloc Québécois leadership election in March 2017 acclaimed Martine Ouellet, a member of the provincial National Assembly of Quebec, as party leader. Ouellet is not a Member of Parliament and intended to see out her term in the provincial legislature until the next provincial election in October 2018.

On 28 February 2018, seven of the Bloc's ten MPs quit the party's caucus to form the Groupe parlementaire québécois (later called Québec debout) citing conflicts with Ouellet's leadership style and her insistence that the Bloc should emphasize promoting Quebec independence over "defending Quebec's interests". Three MPs remained in the Bloc's caucus: Mario Beaulieu (La Pointe-de-l'Île), Xavier Barsalou-Duval (Pierre-Boucher—Les Patriotes—Verchères), and Marilène Gill (Manicouagan).

More than 20 ex-Bloc MPs, including Gilles Duceppe, issued an open letter supporting the seven current MPs who had resigned from caucus and demanding Ouellet's resignation. Nevertheless, after a lengthy meeting, the party's executive issued a statement supporting Ouellet's leadership but also stating that the seven rebels could keep their Bloc Québécois memberships and would not be expelled from the party for quitting the caucus, inviting them to return to the caucus in the future. A Léger Marketing poll conducted shortly after put the Bloc Quebecois at 12% among Quebec voters, its lowest rating ever. Following an election this would likely translate into zero seats, putting the survival of the party into question for the 2019 federal election.

A leadership review referendum was held on Ouellet's leadership on 1 and 2 June 2018 resulting in the party membership rejecting her leadership by 67%, while a proposal that the party prioritize Quebec independence on a daily basis above all other issues also passed with 65% support. Ouellet subsequently announced her resignation as party leader effective 11 June 2018.

Following the announcement of Ouellet's resignation, MPs Michel Boudrias and Simon Marcil announced they would rejoin the party, while party president and MP Mario Beaulieu was named Ouelett's successor on an interim basis until her successor could be chosen. On 22 August 2018, as part of an agreement to reunite the party, Beaulieu ceded the party presidency to Yves Perron; on 17 September 2018, the remaining MPs who had defected from the Bloc rejoined the party and dissolved their breakaway group, Québec debout.

=== Party under Yves-François Blanchet (2019–present) ===
As the only candidate to have entered the race by the 15 January 2019 deadline, former Parti Québécois cabinet minister Yves-François Blanchet was named leader on 17 January 2019. After Blanchet became leader the BQ saw its support increasing in Quebec during the 2019 federal election, which some considered to have exceeded expectations. The BQ increased its number of seats from 10 in 2015, to 32 seats in 2019, both overtaking the NDP to become the third largest party in Canada and regaining official party status.

In the 2021 Canadian federal election, the BQ led by Blanchet won 32 seats, unchanged from the prior election.

The Bloc Québécois held a leadership confidence vote in May 2023. Blanchet won 97% of the vote.

In September 2024, the BQ won a competitive by-election in LaSalle—Émard—Verdun in Montreal. In the 2025 Canadian federal election, the BQ led by Blanchet won 22 seats, a significant decrease from the prior election.

== Relationship with the Parti Québécois ==
The Parti Québécois has close ties to the Bloc and shares its principal objective of independence for Quebec. The two parties have backed each other during election campaigns, and prominent members of each party often attend and speak at the other's public events. In addition, the majority of each party's membership holds membership in both parties. However, on an organizational level the parties are separate entities – the Bloc is not the federal wing of the Parti Québécois, nor the PQ the provincial wing of the Bloc.

Lucien Bouchard has been the leader of both parties. Michel Gauthier, once Bloc's leader, was a PQ member of the National Assembly of Quebec from 1981 until 1988. Former party leader Daniel Paillé was also a PQ member of the National Assembly of Quebec from 1994 to 1996, and a BQ member of Parliament from 2009 to 2011.

In June 2014, Mario Beaulieu, a former PQ riding president and Bloc candidate, was elected leader of the Bloc Québécois. Notwithstanding his previous ties to both parties, Beaulieu has been critical of what he sees as a too timid approach to sovereignty by both the Bloc and PQ. Beaulieu's election as Bloc leader was more warmly received by the PQ's rival party, Option nationale, than by the PQ.

Martine Ouellet was a PQ MNA from 2010 until 2017 and ran twice for the PQ leadership. She continued to sit in the Quebec National Assembly, as an independent MNA, after she was elected Bloc leader.

In the 2015 election, Parti Québécois leader Pierre Karl Péladeau officially endorsed the Bloc, despite earlier calling the party useless. Several incumbent PQ MNAs including Bernard Drainville, Stéphane Bergeron, Maka Kotto, Dave Turcotte and Agnès Maltais also endorsed the Bloc and campaigned for local candidates.

== Party leaders ==
Election	Portrait	Name	Term start	Term end	Riding while leader	Notes
—		Lucien Bouchard (b. 1938)	25 July 1990	16 January 1996	Lac-Saint-Jean	First leader Leader of the Opposition (1993–1996)
Interim		Gilles Duceppe	16 January 1996	17 February 1996	Laurier—Sainte-Marie	Interim leader Leader of the Opposition (1996)
1996		Michel Gauthier (1950–2020)	17 February 1996	15 March 1997	Roberval—Lac-Saint-Jean	Leader of the Opposition (1996–1997); Gauthier resigned in March 1997.
1997		Gilles Duceppe (b. 1947)	15 March 1997	2 May 2011	Laurier—Sainte-Marie	Duceppe resigned as party leader after the 2011 election, in which he lost his own seat.
Interim		Vivian Barbot (b. 1941)	2 May 2011	11 December 2011	None (had just lost in Papineau)	Served as interim leader and president of the party. Louis Plamondon was acting leader in the House of Commons. Barbot became the first person of a visible minority group to lead a Canadian federal political party with parliamentary representation.
2011		Daniel Paillé (b. 1950)	11 December 2011	16 December 2013	None (had just lost in Hochelaga)	Stepped down as leader on 16 December 2013 because of health reasons.
vacant		vacant	16 December 2013	25 June 2014	N/A	André Bellavance was acting leader in the House of Commons until 26 February 2014, when he declared his candidacy for leader. Jean-François Fortin replaced Bellavance as leader in the House of Commons. Party vice president Annie Lessard was the acting president of the party.
2014		Mario Beaulieu (b. 1959)	25 June 2014	10 June 2015	None	Beaulieu relinquished the party leadership on 10 June 2015 but remained party president.
Appointed		Gilles Duceppe	10 June 2015	22 October 2015	None (had just lost in Laurier—Sainte-Marie)	Returned as leader but not as party president. Appointed leader by party executive on 10 June; appointment ratified by the party's general council on 1 July.
Interim		Rhéal Fortin	22 October 2015	18 March 2017	Rivière-du-Nord	
2017		Martine Ouellet (b. 1969)	18 March 2017	11 June 2018	Vachon (National Assembly of Quebec)	Ouellet continued to sit as an independent MNA in the National Assembly of Quebec after being elected BQ leader and intended to serve out her term as an MNA until the October 2018 provincial election. She resigned as leader after being defeated in a leadership review in June 2018.
vacant			11 June 2018	13 June 2018		
Interim		Mario Beaulieu	13 June 2018	17 January 2019	La Pointe-de-l'Île	Named interim leader two days after the resignation of Martine Ouellet.
2019		Yves-François Blanchet (b. 1965)	17 January 2019	present	Beloeil—Chambly	Elected without opposition.

=== Party presidents (2014–present) ===
Until 2015, the party leader was also party president.

Portrait	Name	Term start	Term end	Notes
	Mario Beaulieu (b. 1959)	25 June 2014	22 August 2018	Beaulieu relinquished the party leadership on 10 June 2015 but remained party president. Also served as interim leader from 13 June 2018 to 17 January 2019.
	Yves Perron	22 August 2018	present	

== Election results ==
=== House of Commons ===
Election	Leader	Votes	%		Seats		+/-	Position		Status
Election	Leader	Votes	QC	CA	QC	CA	+/-	QC	CA	Status
1993	Lucien Bouchard	1,846,024	49.3	13.5	54 / 75 (72%)	54 / 295 (18%)	▲44	1st	2nd	Opposition
1997	Gilles Duceppe	1,385,821	37.9	10.7	44 / 75 (59%)	44 / 301 (15%)	▼10	1st	▼3rd	Third party
2000	Gilles Duceppe	1,377,727	39.9	10.7	38 / 75 (51%)	38 / 301 (13%)	▼6	1st	3rd	Third party
2004	Gilles Duceppe	1,680,109	48.9	12.4	54 / 75 (72%)	54 / 308 (18%)	▲16	1st	3rd	Third party
2006	Gilles Duceppe	1,553,201	42.1	10.5	51 / 75 (68%)	51 / 308 (17%)	▼3	1st	3rd	Third party
2008	Gilles Duceppe	1,379,629	38.1	10.0	49 / 75 (65%)	49 / 308 (16%)	▼2	1st	3rd	Third party
2011	Gilles Duceppe	889,788	23.4	6.0	4 / 75 (5%)	4 / 308 (1%)	▼45	▼4th	▼4th	No status
2015	Gilles Duceppe	818,652	19.3	4.7	10 / 78 (13%)	10 / 338 (3%)	▲6	4th	4th	No status
2019	Yves-François Blanchet	1,387,030	32.4	7.6	32 / 78 (41%)	32 / 338 (9%)	▲22	▲2nd	▲3rd	Third party
2021	Yves-François Blanchet	1,301,598	32.1	7.6	32 / 78 (41%)	32 / 338 (9%)	Steady	2nd	3rd	Third party
2025	Yves-François Blanchet	1,236,338	27.7	6.3	22 / 78 (28%)	22 / 343 (6%)	▼10	2nd	3rd	Third party

== See also ==
- Bloc Québécois Shadow Cabinet
- List of federal political parties in Canada
- Mouvement de libération nationale du Québec
- Politics of Canada
- Politics of Quebec
- Secessionist movements of Canada
- Timeline of Quebec history
