= Simon Marcil =

Canadian politician

Member of Parliament for Mirabel
- In office October 19, 2015 – September 20, 2021
- Preceded by: Riding established
- Succeeded by: Jean-Denis Garon

Personal details
- Party: Bloc Québécois
- Other political affiliations: Québec debout (2018)

Simon Marcil is a former Canadian politician who served as the Member of Parliament (MP) for the riding of Mirabel from 2015 to 2021. Marcil was first elected to the House of Commons of Canada in the 2015 election as a member of the Bloc Québécois. On February 28, 2018, however, Marcil, along with six other Bloc MPs, resigned from the Bloc's caucus to sit as an independent MP citing conflicts with the leadership style of Martine Ouellet. Following Ouellet's resignation, he rejoined the party on June 6, 2018. He was re-elected in the 2019 federal election.

On December 22, 2020, the National Post reported that Marcil had been on prolonged medical leave since January 31, 2020, all without informing his constituents. In January 2021, he announced he would not run again in the 2021 federal election. He was elected to Saint-Jérôme City Council in 2025.

Prior to his election, Marcil worked for Hydro-Québec.

== Electoral record ==
2019 Canadian federal election: Mirabel
Party	Candidate	Votes	%	±%	Expenditures
Bloc Québécois	Simon Marcil	33,219	51.08	+19.59	$7,193.50
Liberal	Karl Trudel	16,162	24.85	-1.26	$36,834.25
Conservative	François Desrochers	5,940	9.13	-1.00	none listed
New Democratic	Anne-Marie Saint-Germain	5,219	8.03	-22.05	$902.88
Green	Julie Tremblay	3,517	5.41	+3.22	$10,545.78
People's	Christian Montpetit	641	0.99		none listed
Indépendance du Québec	Pietro Biacchi	332	0.51		$0.00
Total valid votes/expense limit		65,030	98.06		
Total rejected ballots		1,286	1.94	-0.00	
Turnout		66,316	68.47	-0.43	
Eligible voters		96,848			
Bloc Québécois hold		Swing		+10.41	
Source: Elections Canada

2015 Canadian federal election: Mirabel
Party	Candidate	Votes	%	±%	Expenditures
Bloc Québécois	Simon Marcil	18,710	31.49	+0.48	$14,070.30
New Democratic	Mylène Freeman	17,873	30.08	-19.47	$52,822.53
Liberal	Karl Trudel	15,514	26.11	+18.36	$16,340.47
Conservative	Gordon Ferguson	6,020	10.13	+0.91	$4,496.74
Green	Jocelyn Gifford	1,301	2.19	+0.17	–
Total valid votes/Expense limit		59,418	100.0		$227,491.40
Total rejected ballots		1,178	–	–	
Turnout		60,596	–	–	
Eligible voters		87,622			
Bloc Québécois gain from New Democratic		Swing		+9.98	
Source: Elections Canada
