= 2019 Canadian federal election =

- October 21, 2019

338 seats in the House of Commons 170 seats needed for a majority
- Opinion polls
- Registered: 27,373,058
- Turnout: 67.0% (▼1.3 pp)
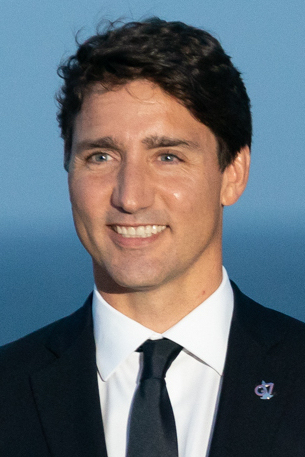

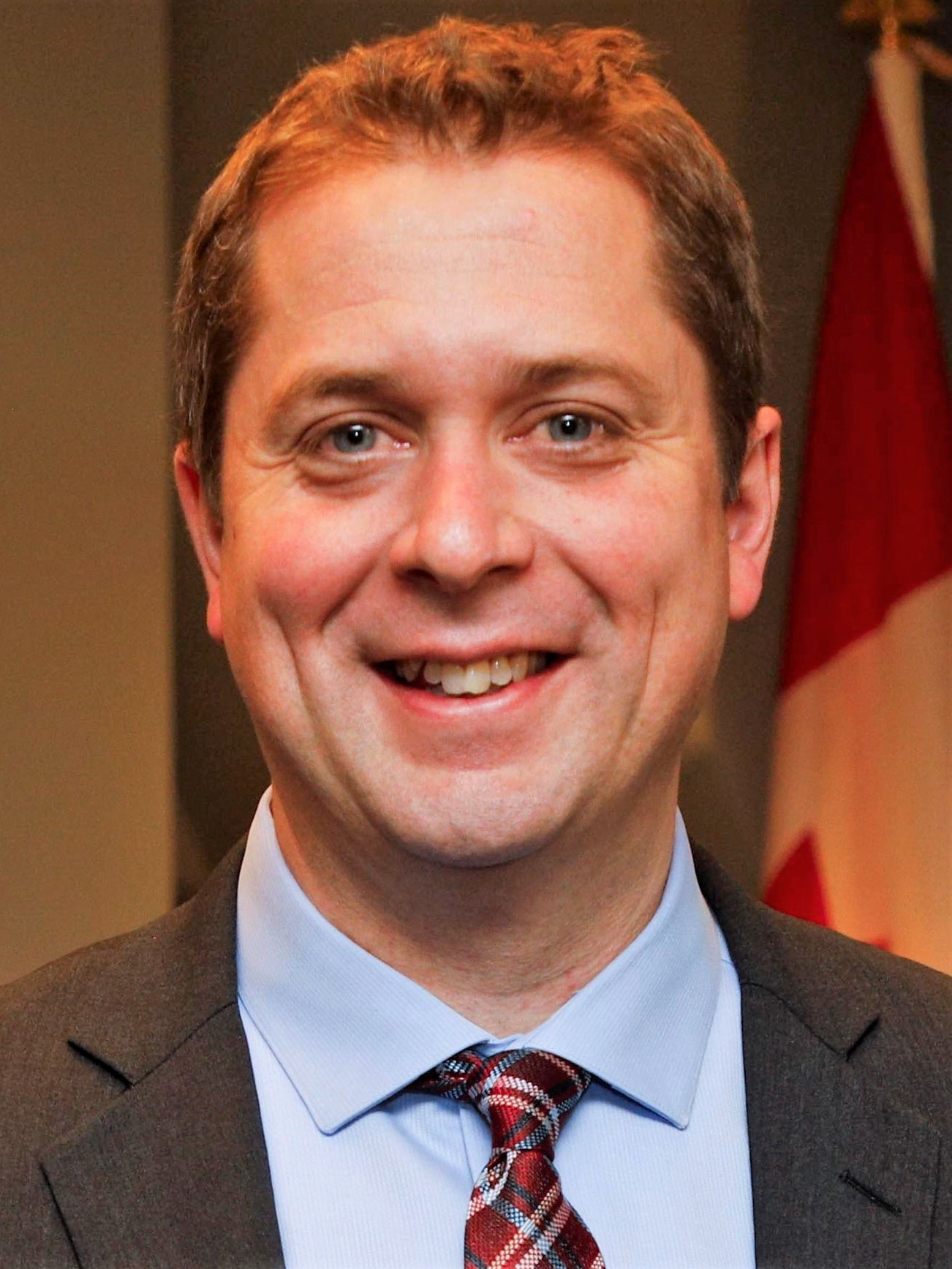

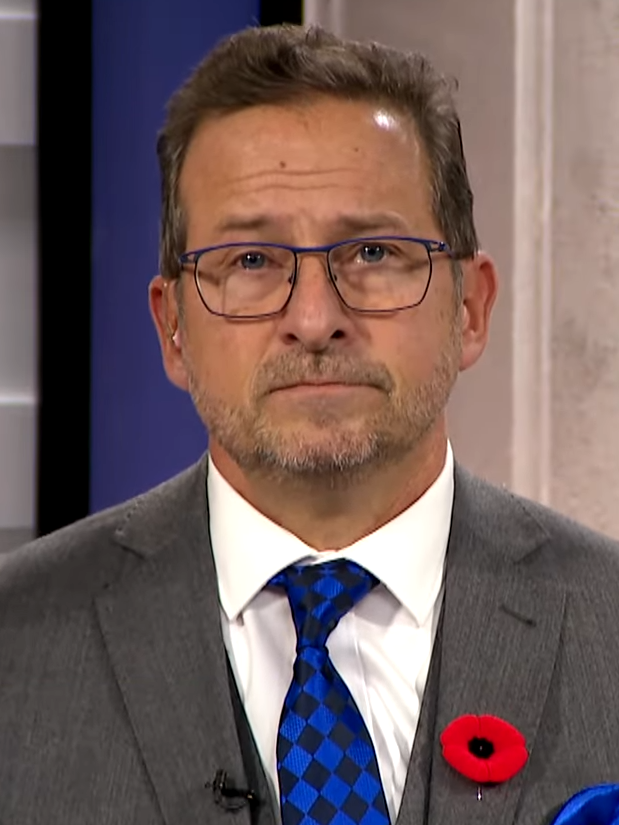

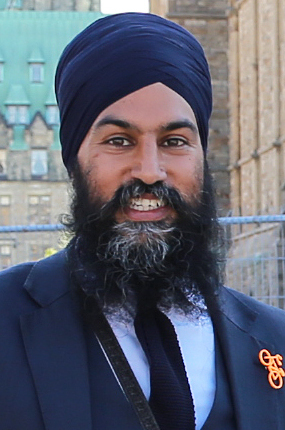

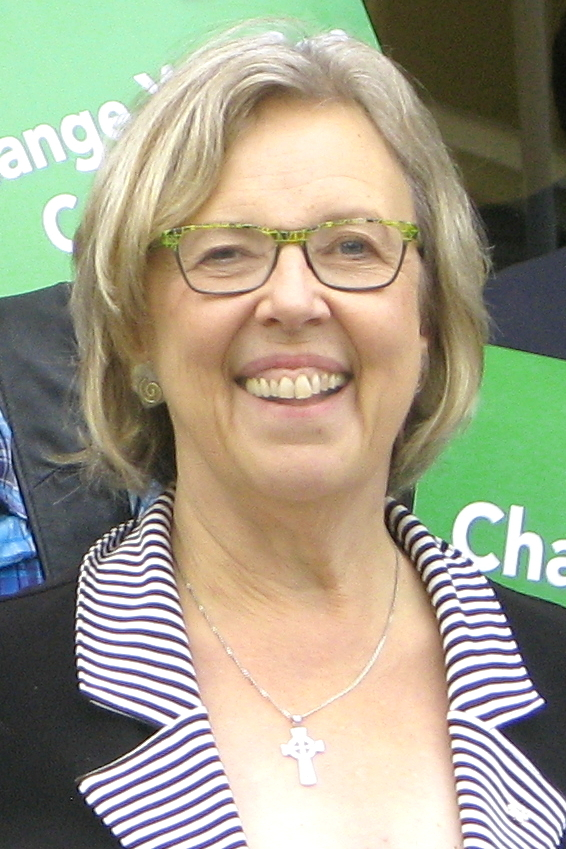

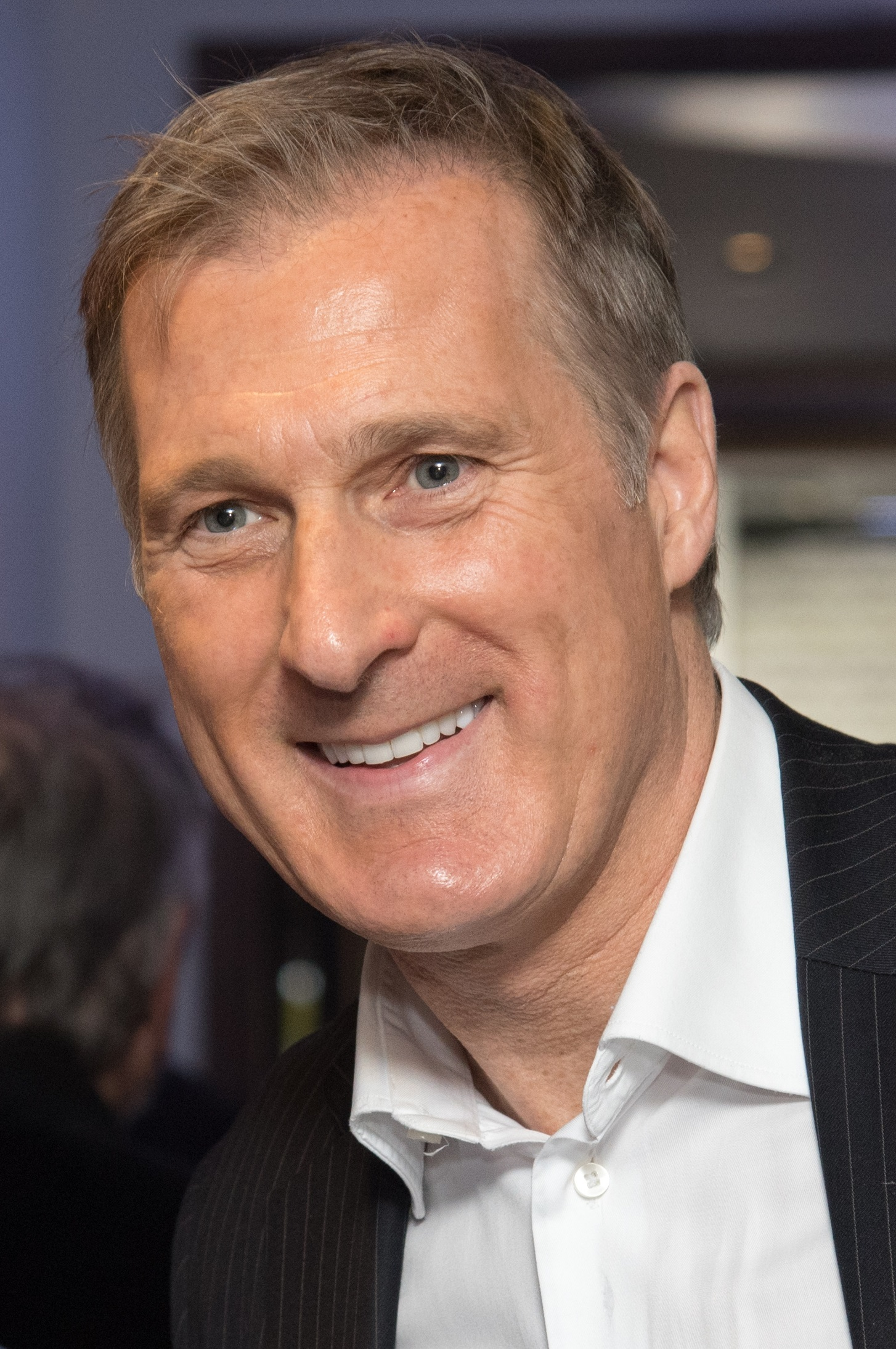
	First party	Second party	Third party
Leader	Justin Trudeau	Andrew Scheer	Yves-François Blanchet
Party	Liberal	Conservative	Bloc Québécois
Leader since	April 14, 2013	May 27, 2017	January 17, 2019
Leader's seat	Papineau	Regina—Qu'Appelle	Ran in Beloeil—Chambly (won)
Last election	184 seats, 39.47%	99 seats, 31.91%	10 seats, 4.67%
Seats before	177	95	10
Seats won	157	121	32
Seat change	▼20	▲26	▲22
Popular vote	6,018,728	6,239,227	1,387,030
Percentage	33.12%	34.34%	7.63%
Swing	▼6.40 pp	▲2.43 pp	▲2.96 pp
	Fourth party	Fifth party	Sixth party
Leader	Jagmeet Singh	Elizabeth May	Maxime Bernier
Party	New Democratic	Green	People's
Leader since	October 1, 2017	August 27, 2006	September 14, 2018
Leader's seat	Burnaby South	Saanich—Gulf Islands	Beauce (lost re-election)
Last election	44 seats, 19.72%	1 seat, 3.43%	New party
Seats before	39	2 (Note: Does not include Pierre Nantel, who sat as an independent at the dissolution of Parliament, but ran as a Green Party candidate in the 2019 election)	1
Seats won	24	3	0
Seat change	▼15	▲1	▼1
Popular vote	2,903,722	1,189,607	294,092
Percentage	15.98%	6.55%	1.62%
Swing	▼3.74 pp	▲3.12 pp	New party
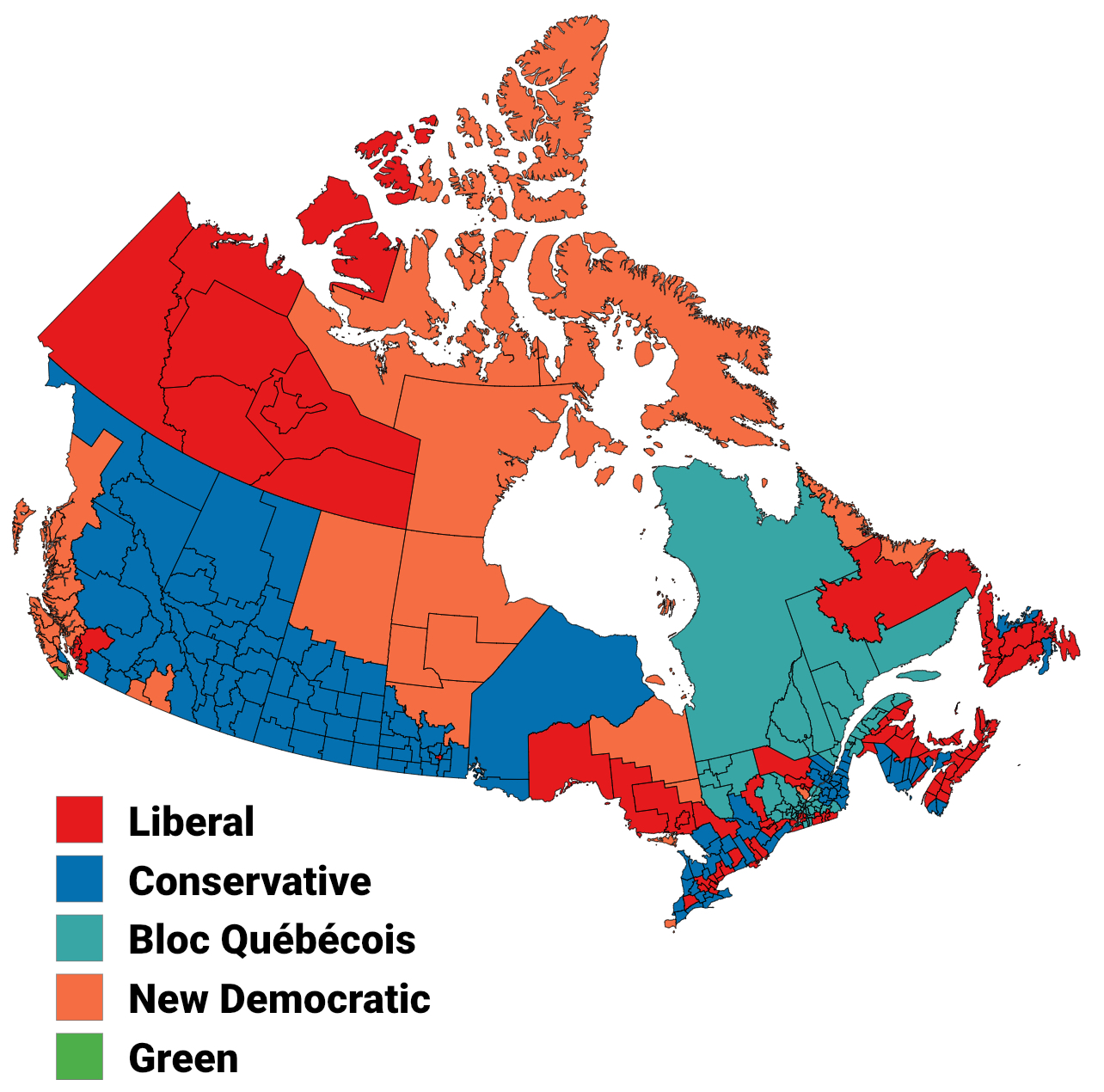
Prime Minister before election
Justin Trudeau
Liberal
Prime Minister after election
Justin Trudeau
Liberal

The 2019 Canadian federal election was held on October 21, 2019. Members of the House of Commons were elected to the 43rd Canadian Parliament. In keeping with the maximum four-year term under a 2007 amendment to the Canada Elections Act, the writs of election for the 2019 election were issued by Governor General Julie Payette on September 11, 2019.

With 33.12% of the vote for the Liberal Party, led by incumbent Prime Minister Justin Trudeau, the 2019 election set, at the time, a record for the lowest vote share for a party that would go on to form a single-party minority government (this record would later be beaten in the subsequent 2021 federal election). The Liberals lost the popular vote to the Conservative Party by one per cent, marking only the second time in Canadian history that a governing party formed a government while receiving less than 35 per cent of the national popular vote, the first time being the inaugural 1867 Canadian federal election after Confederation. It was also the first time since 1979 that the party with the most votes overall did not win the most seats, and the first election since 1926 in which the Liberals won the most seats without receiving the most votes.

The Conservatives, led by Andrew Scheer, won 121 seats and remained the Official Opposition. The Bloc Québécois, led by Yves-François Blanchet, won 32 seats to regain official party status and became the third party for the first time since 2008. The New Democratic Party, led by Jagmeet Singh, won 24 seats, its worst result since 2004. The Green Party, led by Elizabeth May, saw its best election results with three seats and for the first time received over one million votes. The Greens also elected their first MP outside of British Columbia, Jenica Atwin in Fredericton, New Brunswick. Independent MP Jody Wilson-Raybould won her seat and was the first independent to win a seat in over a decade. In their first election, the People's Party failed to win any seats, as leader Maxime Bernier lost his own seat in Beauce, a seat he won as a Conservative in the previous four elections before forming his own party following his unsuccessful bid for the Conservative Party's leadership.

== Background ==
The 2015 federal election resulted in a Liberal majority government headed by Justin Trudeau. The Conservatives became the Official Opposition (with Stephen Harper announcing his resignation as party leader) and the New Democrats (NDP) became the third party. While members of the Bloc Québécois and the Greens were elected to the House, both failed to achieve the required number of MPs—twelve—for official party status. Bloc leader Gilles Duceppe announced his resignation shortly after the election, and was succeeded by Parti Québécois MNA Martine Ouellet. After losing a leadership review, Ouellet announced she would step down as Bloc leader on June 11, 2018, and was succeeded by Yves-François Blanchet on January 17, 2019.

Tom Mulcair was rejected as NDP party leader; he gained only 48% of the vote at the NDP's April 2016 leadership review. The party held a leadership election on October 1, 2017, electing Ontario MPP and the former Deputy Leader of the Ontario New Democratic Party Jagmeet Singh as Mulcair's successor.

=== Parties and standings ===
The table below lists parties represented in the House of Commons after the 2015 federal election, and the standings at dissolution.

Name	Ideology	Leader	2015 result		At dissolution
Name	Ideology	Leader	Votes (%)	Seats	At dissolution
Liberal	Liberalism; Social liberalism	Justin Trudeau	39.47%	184 / 338	177 / 338
Conservative	Conservatism; Economic liberalism Fiscal conservatism	Andrew Scheer	31.89%	99 / 338	95 / 338
New Democratic	Social democracy Democratic socialism	Jagmeet Singh	19.71%	44 / 338	39 / 338
Bloc Québécois	Quebec nationalism	Yves-François Blanchet	4.66%	10 / 338	10 / 338
Green (Note: Following his removal from the NDP caucus, Pierre Nantel sat as an independent until the writ was dropped, but ran as a Green Party candidate on Federal election day.)	Green politics Green liberalism	Elizabeth May	3.45%	1 / 338	2 / 338
PPC	Right-wing populism Canadian nationalism Conservatism	Maxime Bernier	N/A		1 / 338
Co-operative Commonwealth (Note: Erin Weir designated himself as a member of the Co-operative Commonwealth Federation following his expulsion from the NDP caucus. The CCF is not a registered party and Weir's designation exists only in a parliamentary, not electoral, sense. See: Co-operative Commonwealth Federation#2018)	Social democracy	N/A	N/A		1 / 338
Independents	N/A	N/A	0.28%	0 / 338	8 / 338
Vacant seats	N/A		N/A		5 / 338

=== Bill C-44 ===
Bill C-44 was passed in 2017 and assigned responsibility to the Parliamentary Budget Office to calculate the cost of party platforms for elections; the review was available in the 2019 election. The Parliamentary Budget Office had a $500,000 budget for costing party platforms for this election, but announced it would only review a party platform at the request of the authoring party. It also conducted confidential assessments of independent and party platform proposals preceding the election campaign. The service was also available to members of parliament representing a party without official party status in the House of Commons, like Elizabeth May's Green Party.

=== Electoral reform ===
In the lead-up to the 2015 federal election, Trudeau committed to replacing first-past-the-post voting, but the first-past-the-post electoral system was ultimately retained.

Following the Liberal victory, the Special Committee on Electoral Reform was formed, and in December 2016 recommended a proportional electoral system be introduced following a national referendum. The report was criticized by Minister of Democratic Institutions Maryam Monsef for not recommending a specific electoral system, though the committee argued that it had fulfilled its mandate. In February 2017, Trudeau issued a mandate to newly-appointed Minister of Democratic Institutions Karina Gould which dropped the issue, on the grounds that "A clear preference for a new electoral system, let alone a consensus, has not emerged."

=== Assessment of Trudeau's government ===
In July 2019, an independent academically edited study, Assessing Justin Trudeau's Liberal Government: 353 Promises and a Mandate for Change, was published by Les Presses de l'Université Laval, finding that Justin Trudeau's government kept 92 per cent of pledges, when complete and partial pledges were added together, while the Harper government kept 85 per cent of complete and partial pledges. When only completed, realized pledges were calculated, Harper's government, in their last year, kept 77 per cent of promises while the Liberal government kept 53.5 per cent. The book notes that Harper's pledges tended towards transactional pledges which target sub-populations while Trudeau's government's promises were transformative—ambitious pledges the Liberals took while they were the third-place party. Trudeau's government, according to the researchers, and the "last Harper government had the highest rates of follow-through on their campaign promises of any Canadian government over the last 35 years."

=== Election spending ===
According to Elections Canada rules, third parties are allowed to spend $1,023,400 in the pre-election period between June 30 and the start of the election campaign. They can spend an additional $511,700 during the election campaign.

==== Reimbursements for political parties and candidates ====
Political parties receive a reimbursement for 50 per cent of their election expenses during the writ period. Similarly, electoral district associations receive a reimbursement of 60 per cent of their election expenses during the writ period. Both reimbursements are publicly funded. (Note: While the source is from 2015, this still applied to 2019)

==== Registered third parties ====
A person or group must register as a third party immediately after incurring expenses totaling $500 or more on regulated activities that take place during the pre-election period or election period. The regulated activities are partisan activities (that promote parties or candidates), election surveys, partisan advertising and election advertising. Furthermore, to be a third party you must be :

- an individual who is a Canadian citizen, a permanent resident or lives in Canada
- a corporation that carries on business in Canada, or
- a group, as long as a person responsible for the group is a Canadian citizen, a permanent resident or lives in Canada.

One cannot spend money or use their resources to influence Canadian elections if they are a foreign third party.

There are also strict limits on expenses related to regulated activities, and specific limits that can be incurred to promote or oppose the election of one or more candidates in a particular electoral district. Registered third parties are subject to an election advertising expenses limit of $1,023,400 in the pre-election period, of which $10,234 can be spent in a given electoral district and $511,700 during the election period. Of that amount, no more than $4,386 can be spent to promote or oppose the election of one or more candidates in a particular electoral district.

=== Incumbents not running for reelection ===
Below are the 44 MPs who chose not to run in the 2019 federal election:

Member of Parliament (Note: affiliation as at dissolution)	Electoral district	Province or territory	MP since
Frank Baylis	Pierrefonds—Dollard	Quebec	2015
Bill Casey	Cumberland—Colchester	Nova Scotia	2015 (Note: had also served as MP in 1988–1993, 1997–2009)
Rodger Cuzner	Cape Breton—Canso	Nova Scotia	2000
Mark Eyking	Sydney—Victoria	Nova Scotia	2000
Colin Fraser	West Nova	Nova Scotia	2015
Pam Goldsmith-Jones	West Vancouver—Sunshine Coast—Sea to Sky Country	British Columbia	2015
T. J. Harvey	Tobique—Mactaquac	New Brunswick	2015
Andrew Leslie	Orléans	Ontario	2015
Eva Nassif	Vimy	Quebec	2015
John Oliver	Oakville	Ontario	2015
Denis Paradis	Brome—Missisquoi	Quebec	2015
Kyle Peterson	Newmarket—Aurora	Ontario	2015
Don Rusnak	Thunder Bay—Rainy River	Ontario	2015
Geng Tan	Don Valley North	Ontario	2015
Borys Wrzesnewskyj	Etobicoke Centre	Ontario	2015 (Note: had also served as MP in 2004–2011)
David Anderson	Cypress Hills—Grasslands	Saskatchewan	2000
Jim Eglinski	Yellowhead	Alberta	2014
Kellie Leitch	Simcoe—Grey	Ontario	2011
Guy Lauzon	Stormont—Dundas—South Glengarry	Ontario	2004
Larry Miller	Bruce—Grey—Owen Sound	Ontario	2004
Rob Nicholson	Niagara Falls	Ontario	2004
Alex Nuttall	Barrie—Springwater—Oro-Medonte	Ontario	2015
Bev Shipley	Lambton—Kent—Middlesex	Ontario	2006
Robert Sopuck	Dauphin—Swan River—Neepawa	Manitoba	2010
Kevin Sorenson	Battle River—Crowfoot	Alberta	2000
David Tilson	Dufferin—Caledon	Ontario	2004
Dave Van Kesteren	Chatham-Kent—Leamington	Ontario	2006
Mark Warawa (Note: announced retirement; died before election)	Langley—Aldergrove	British Columbia	2004
Marjolaine Boutin-Sweet	Hochelaga	Quebec	2011
David Christopherson	Hamilton Centre	Ontario	2004
Nathan Cullen	Skeena—Bulkley Valley	British Columbia	2004
Fin Donnelly	Port Moody—Coquitlam	British Columbia	2009
Linda Duncan	Edmonton Strathcona	Alberta	2008
Hélène Laverdière	Laurier—Sainte-Marie	Quebec	2011
Irene Mathyssen	London—Fanshawe	Ontario	2006
Anne Minh-Thu Quach	Salaberry—Suroît	Quebec	2011
Christine Moore	Abitibi—Témiscamingue	Quebec	2011
Murray Rankin	Victoria	British Columbia	2012
Romeo Saganash	Abitibi—Baie-James—Nunavik—Eeyou	Quebec	2011
Erin Weir (Note: elected as NDP)	Regina—Lewvan	Saskatchewan	2015
Celina Caesar-Chavannes (Note: elected as Liberal)	Whitby	Ontario	2015
Tony Clement (Note: elected as Conservative)	Parry Sound-Muskoka	Ontario	2006
Darshan Kang	Calgary Skyview	Alberta	2015
Hunter Tootoo	Nunavut	Nunavut	2015

== Timeline ==
Changes in seats held (2015–2019)

Seat	Before				Change		
Seat	Date	Member	Party	Reason	Date	Member	Party
Medicine Hat—Cardston—Warner	March 23, 2016	Jim Hillyer	█ Conservative	Death in office	October 24, 2016	Glen Motz	█ Conservative
Nunavut	May 31, 2016	Hunter Tootoo	█ Liberal	Resigned from caucus (Note: to seek treatment for addiction)			█ Independent
Ottawa—Vanier	August 16, 2016	Mauril Bélanger	█ Liberal	Death in office	April 3, 2017	Mona Fortier	█ Liberal
Calgary Heritage	August 26, 2016	Stephen Harper	█ Conservative	Resignation	April 3, 2017	Bob Benzen	█ Conservative
Calgary Midnapore	September 23, 2016	Jason Kenney	█ Conservative	Resignation (Note: in order to seek the leadership of the Progressive Conservative Association of Alberta)	April 3, 2017	Stephanie Kusie	█ Conservative
Saint-Laurent	January 31, 2017	Stéphane Dion	█ Liberal	Resignation (Note: becoming Ambassador to the European Union)	April 3, 2017	Emmanuella Lambropoulos	█ Liberal
Markham—Thornhill	January 31, 2017	John McCallum	█ Liberal	Resignation (Note: becoming Ambassador to China)	April 3, 2017	Mary Ng	█ Liberal
Sturgeon River—Parkland	July 4, 2017	Rona Ambrose	█ Conservative	Resignation	October 23, 2017	Dane Lloyd	█ Conservative
Lac-Saint-Jean	August 9, 2017	Denis Lebel	█ Conservative	Resignation	October 23, 2017	Richard Hébert	█ Liberal
Calgary Skyview	August 31, 2017	Darshan Kang	█ Liberal	Resigned from caucus (Note: amid allegations of sexual harassment)			█ Independent
Scarborough—Agincourt	September 14, 2017	Arnold Chan	█ Liberal	Death in office	December 11, 2017	Jean Yip	█ Liberal
Bonavista—Burin—Trinity	September 30, 2017	Judy Foote	█ Liberal	Resignation (Note: former Minister of Public Services and Procurement)	December 11, 2017	Churence Rogers	█ Liberal
South Surrey—White Rock	September 30, 2017	Dianne Watts	█ Conservative	Resignation (Note: following her entrance into the 2018 British Columbia Liberal Party leadership election)	December 11, 2017	Gordon Hogg	█ Liberal
Battlefords—Lloydminster	October 2, 2017	Gerry Ritz	█ Conservative	Resignation	December 11, 2017	Rosemarie Falk	█ Conservative
Chicoutimi—Le Fjord	December 1, 2017	Denis Lemieux	█ Liberal	Resignation	June 18, 2018	Richard Martel	█ Conservative
Terrebonne	February 28, 2018	Michel Boudrias	█ Bloc Québécois	Resigned from caucus			█ Groupe parl qué
Terrebonne	February 28, 2018	Michel Boudrias	█ Bloc Québécois	Resigned from caucus	June 6, 2018		█ Bloc Québécois
Rivière-du-Nord	February 28, 2018	Rhéal Fortin	█ Bloc Québécois	Resigned from caucus			█ Groupe parl qué
Rivière-du-Nord	February 28, 2018	Rhéal Fortin	█ Bloc Québécois	Resigned from caucus	September 17, 2018		█ Bloc Québécois
Mirabel	February 28, 2018	Simon Marcil	█ Bloc Québécois	Resigned from caucus			█ Groupe parl qué
Mirabel	February 28, 2018	Simon Marcil	█ Bloc Québécois	Resigned from caucus	June 6, 2018		█ Bloc Québécois
Repentigny	February 28, 2018	Monique Pauzé	█ Bloc Québécois	Resigned from caucus			█ Groupe parl qué
Repentigny	February 28, 2018	Monique Pauzé	█ Bloc Québécois	Resigned from caucus	September 17, 2018		█ Bloc Québécois
Bécancour—Nicolet—Saurel	February 28, 2018	Louis Plamondon	█ Bloc Québécois	Resigned from caucus			█ Groupe parl qué
Bécancour—Nicolet—Saurel	February 28, 2018	Louis Plamondon	█ Bloc Québécois	Resigned from caucus	September 17, 2018		█ Bloc Québécois
Joliette	February 28, 2018	Gabriel Ste-Marie	█ Bloc Québécois	Resigned from caucus			█ Groupe parl qué
Joliette	February 28, 2018	Gabriel Ste-Marie	█ Bloc Québécois	Resigned from caucus	September 17, 2018		█ Bloc Québécois
Montcalm	February 28, 2018	Luc Thériault	█ Bloc Québécois	Resigned from caucus			█ Groupe parl qué
Montcalm	February 28, 2018	Luc Thériault	█ Bloc Québécois	Resigned from caucus	September 17, 2018		█ Bloc Québécois
Leeds—Grenville—Thousand Islands and Rideau Lakes	May 2, 2018	Gord Brown	█ Conservative	Death in office	December 3, 2018	Michael Barrett	█ Conservative
Regina—Lewvan	May 3, 2018	Erin Weir	█ New Democratic	Removed from caucus (Note: over harassment allegations)	May 11, 2018		█ CCF
Outremont	August 3, 2018	Tom Mulcair	█ New Democratic	Resignation	February 25, 2019	Rachel Bendayan	█ Liberal
Beauce	August 23, 2018	Maxime Bernier	█ Conservative	Resigned from caucus	September 14, 2018		█ People's
Burnaby South	September 14, 2018	Kennedy Stewart	█ New Democratic	Resignation (Note: to run for Mayor of Vancouver)	February 25, 2019	Jagmeet Singh	█ New Democratic
Aurora—Oak Ridges—Richmond Hill	September 17, 2018	Leona Alleslev	█ Liberal	Changed affiliation			█ Conservative
York—Simcoe	September 30, 2018	Peter Van Loan	█ Conservative	Resignation	February 25, 2019	Scot Davidson	█ Conservative
Parry Sound-Muskoka	November 7, 2018	Tony Clement	█ Conservative	Resigned from caucus (Note: as a result of a sexting scandal)			█ Independent
Brampton East	November 30, 2018	Raj Grewal	█ Liberal	Resigned from caucus (Note: to seek treatment for a gambling addiction)			█ Independent
Nanaimo—Ladysmith	January 2, 2019	Sheila Malcolmson	█ New Democratic	Resigned (Note: to run for the provincial district of Nanaimo)	May 6, 2019	Paul Manly	█ Green
Saint-Léonard—Saint-Michel	January 29, 2019	Nicola Di Iorio	█ Liberal	Resignation			
Kings—Hants	February 10, 2019	Scott Brison	█ Liberal	Resignation			
Whitby	March 20, 2019	Celina Caesar-Chavannes	█ Liberal	Resigned from caucus			█ Independent
Markham—Stouffville	April 2, 2019	Jane Philpott	█ Liberal	Removed from caucus (Note: amid the SNC-Lavalin affair)			█ Independent
Vancouver Granville	April 2, 2019	Jody Wilson-Raybould	█ Liberal	Removed from caucus			█ Independent
Langley—Aldergrove	June 20, 2019	Mark Warawa	█ Conservative	Death in office (Note: dies due to cancer, while serving as a Conservative MP)			
Calgary Forest Lawn	August 2, 2019	Deepak Obhrai	█ Conservative	Death in office			
Longueuil—Saint-Hubert	August 16, 2019	Pierre Nantel	█ New Democratic	Removed from caucus (Note: will run for Greens in 2019 Canadian federal election)	August 16, 2019		█ Independent

=== 2015 ===
- October 19, 2015: The Liberal Party of Canada wins a majority government in the 42nd Canadian federal election. Outgoing Prime Minister Stephen Harper announces his intention to resign as leader of the Conservative Party of Canada.
- October 22, 2015: Gilles Duceppe resigns as leader of the Bloc Québécois and is replaced on an interim-basis by Rivière-du-Nord MP Rhéal Fortin.
- November 4, 2015: Justin Trudeau is sworn in as the 23rd Prime Minister of Canada.
- November 5, 2015: Sturgeon River—Parkland MP and former cabinet minister Rona Ambrose is elected interim Conservative leader.
- December 3, 2015: The 42nd Parliament is convened.

=== 2016 ===
- March 23, 2016: Jim Hillyer, Conservative MP for Medicine Hat—Cardston—Warner dies of a heart attack.
- April 10, 2016: 52% of delegates at the 2016 NDP convention voted in support of a leadership review motion to hold a leadership election within 24 months. Party leader Tom Mulcair announces he will stay on as leader until his replacement is chosen.
- August 15, 2016: Mauril Belanger, Liberal MP for Ottawa—Vanier dies of ALS.
- August 26, 2016: Former Prime Minister Stephen Harper, Conservative MP for Calgary Heritage resigns his seat in the House of Commons.
- September 9, 2016: Strength in Democracy, a party which had three incumbent MPs among its 17 candidates in the last election is deregistered by Elections Canada for failure to file papers maintaining its party status.
- September 23, 2016: Jason Kenney, Conservative MP for Calgary Midnapore resigns his seat to seek the leadership of the Progressive Conservative Association of Alberta.

=== 2017 ===
- February 1, 2017: John McCallum, Liberal MP for Markham—Thornhill resigns his seat to become Ambassador to China.
- February 6, 2017: Stéphane Dion, Liberal MP for Saint-Laurent resigns his seat to become Ambassador to Germany and Special Envoy of Canada to the European Union and Europe.
- March 18, 2017: Martine Ouellet is acclaimed as leader of the Bloc Québécois.
- May 27, 2017: Andrew Scheer is elected leader of the Conservative Party of Canada.
- July 4, 2017: Rona Ambrose, Conservative MP for Sturgeon River—Parkland resigns her seat in the House of Commons.
- August 31, 2017: Calgary Skyview MP Darshan Kang resigns from the Liberal caucus amid sexual harassment allegations.
- September 14, 2017: Arnold Chan, Liberal MP for Scarborough—Agincourt dies of cancer.
- October 1, 2017: Jagmeet Singh is elected leader of the New Democratic Party.
- December 1, 2017: Denis Lemieux, Liberal MP for Chicoutimi—Le Fjord resigns his seat in the House of Commons.

=== 2018 ===
- February 28, 2018: Citing conflict with party leader Martine Ouellet, seven Bloc Québécois MPs resign from the party caucus, establishing the Groupe parlementaire québécois for parliamentary purposes, while remaining independent of any electoral political party. Only Xavier Barsalou-Duval (Pierre-Boucher—Les Patriotes—Verchères), Mario Beaulieu (La Pointe-de-l'Île), and Marilène Gill (Manicouagan) remain in the Bloc Québécois caucus.
- May 2, 2018: Gord Brown, Conservative MP for Leeds—Grenville—Thousand Islands and Rideau Lakes dies of a heart attack.
- May 9, 2018: Members of the Groupe parlementaire québécois announce they will be forming a new political party, Québec debout.
- June 4, 2018: After losing a leadership review, Martine Ouellet announces she will step down as leader of the Bloc Québécois effective June 11, 2018.
- June 6, 2018: Michel Boudrias and Simon Marcil, Québec debout MPs for Terrebonne and Mirabel, respectively, announce they will return to the Bloc Québécois caucus as a result of Martine Ouellet's resignation as party leader. Citing the Bloc's vote the previous weekend to focus exclusively on Quebec sovereignty, Québec debout spokesman Rhéal Fortin announces that he and the party's other four MPs will not rejoin the Bloc Québécois.
- August 3, 2018: Tom Mulcair, NDP MP for Outremont resigns his seat in the House of Commons.
- August 23, 2018: Beauce MP Maxime Bernier resigns from the Conservative caucus in disagreement with the leadership of Andrew Scheer. Bernier announces his intention to form a new federal party.
- September 14, 2018:
  - Three weeks after leaving the Conservative caucus, Beauce MP Maxime Bernier formally launches the People's Party of Canada, becoming its first MP.
  - Kennedy Stewart, NDP MP for Burnaby South, resigns to run for mayor of Vancouver, triggering a by-election in his riding.
- September 17, 2018:
  - All five Québec debout MPs – Rhéal Fortin (Rivière-du-Nord), Monique Pauzé (Repentigny), Louis Plamondon (Bécancour—Nicolet—Saurel), Gabriel Ste-Marie (Joliette), and Luc Thériault (Montcalm) – announce they will rejoin the Bloc Québécois, officially dissolving Quebec debout.
  - Leona Alleslev, Liberal MP for Aurora—Oak Ridges—Richmond Hill, crosses the floor to join the Conservatives, citing concerns for the Liberal's handling of the economy, foreign and security policies, and international trade.
- September 30, 2018: Peter Van Loan, Conservative MP for York—Simcoe resigns his seat in the House of Commons.
- November 7, 2018: Parry Sound-Muskoka MP Tony Clement resigns from the Conservative caucus, at the request of leader Andrew Scheer, due to a sexting scandal.
- November 30, 2018: Brampton East MP Raj Grewal resigns from the Liberal caucus to enter treatment due to a gambling addiction.

=== 2019 ===
- January 2, 2019: Sheila Malcolmson, NDP MP for Nanaimo—Ladysmith resigned her seat to seek election in the British Columbia provincial riding of Nanaimo.
- January 17, 2019: As no other candidate had entered the race by the January 15 nomination deadline, Yves-François Blanchet was acclaimed leader of the Bloc Québécois.
- January 29, 2019: Nicola Di Iorio, Liberal MP for Saint-Léonard—Saint-Michel resigned his seat in the House of Commons.
- February 10, 2019: Scott Brison, Liberal MP for Kings—Hants resigned his seat in the House of Commons.
- February 25, 2019: By-elections were held in Outremont, York—Simcoe and Burnaby South, electing Liberal Rachel Bendayan, Conservative Scot Davidson, and New Democrat Jagmeet Singh, respectively.
- March 20, 2019: Whitby MP Celina Caesar-Chavannes resigned from the Liberal caucus.
- April 2, 2019: Markham—Stouffville MP Jane Philpott and Vancouver Granville MP Jody Wilson-Raybould were removed from the Liberal caucus.
- May 6, 2019: A by-election was held in Nanaimo—Ladysmith, electing Green candidate Paul Manly.
- June 20, 2019: Mark Warawa, Conservative MP for Langley—Aldergrove died of cancer.
- August 2, 2019: Deepak Obhrai, Conservative MP for Calgary Forest Lawn died from liver cancer.
- August 16, 2019: Pierre Nantel was removed from the New Democratic Party caucus and de-selected as the NDP candidate for Longueuil—Saint-Hubert after reports surfaced of ongoing discussions regarding Nantel joining the Green Party of Canada. He announces that he is now an independent MP.
- August 19, 2019: Pierre Nantel repeated that he will remain an independent MP until the end of his term in the current Parliament and announces that he will be a candidate for the Green Party of Canada in the election for the next Parliament.
- September 10, 2019: The Rhinoceros Party nominated a candidate named Maxime Bernier in Beauce, the riding of People's Party leader Maxime Bernier.
- September 11, 2019: Parliament is dissolved and writs of election are dropped.
- September 13, 2019: Elizabeth May announced that her party will conduct more thorough "re-vetting" of candidates after media reports of some Green candidates have made past statements opposing legal abortion.
- September 15, 2019: Andrew Scheer said he will stand by candidates despite "controversial" comments in the past as long as the candidate apologizes, and takes responsibility for said comments.
- September 16, 2019: Maxime Bernier was officially invited to the debates organized by the Leaders' Debates Commission after Commissioner David Johnston announces the People's Party meets the criteria set for the debates.
- October 11–14, 2019: Advance polls were open, with an estimated record 4.7 million electors casting their ballots, a turnout increase of 29% above the 2015 general election. It also marked the first time polls have been open for 12 hours each day.
- October 18, 2019: Elections Canada reports historic turnout among international voters, with 21,842 electors casting their ballots.
- October 21, 2019: Election Day: The Liberal Party, led by incumbent Prime Minister Justin Trudeau, forms a minority government with 157 seats.

== Endorsements ==
Endorsements received by each party
Type	Liberal	Conservative	NDP	Bloc Québécois	Green	PPC	No endorsement
Media	Hamilton Spectator; Toronto Star; The Varsity (Note: Endorsed a Liberal minority with an NDP/Green balance of power); Le Devoir (Note: Joint Liberal/BQ endorsement.)	PostMedia		Le Devoir			The Globe and Mail
Politicians and public figures	Barack Obama; Masai Ujiri; Martin Luther King III	Blaine Higgs; Jason Kenney; Brian Pallister	Rupi Kaur; Rachel Notley (Note: Endorsed Heather McPherson, the NDP candidate in her riding of Edmonton-Strathcona); Wab Kinew; Ryan Meili		Pamela Anderson; Neil Young		Dennis King; François Legault; Hazel McCallion; Scott Moe; John Tory
Unions and business associations			Ontario Federation of Labour				

== Campaign slogans ==
Party	English	French	Translation of French (unofficial)
Conservative Party	"It's time for you to get ahead."	"Plus. Pour vous. Dès maintenant."	"More. For you. Starting now."
New Democratic Party	"In it for you."	"Les progressistes : c'est nous" (Note: The NDP changed their French slogan during the campaign. Prior to this one, they used "On se bat pour vous", which is "We Fight for You" in English.)	"We are the progressives"
Liberal Party	"Choose Forward"	"Choisir d'avancer"	"Choosing to move forward"
Bloc Québécois	N/A	"Le Québec, c'est nous"	"Quebec, it's us" or "We are Quebec"
Green Party	"Not Left. Not Right. Forward Together."	"L'urgence d'agir." (Note: The GPC changed their French slogan during the campaign. Prior to this one, they used "Ni à droite ni à gauche. Vers l'avant ensemble", which is "Neither left nor right. Forward together" in English.)	"The urgency to act."
People's Party	"Strong & Free"	"Fort et libre"	"Strong and free"

== Election campaign ==
=== Liberal ===
The Parliament of Canada's Ethics Commissioner, Mario Dion, found that Trudeau improperly influenced then Minister of Justice and Attorney General Jody Wilson-Raybould to intervene in an ongoing criminal case against Quebec-based construction company SNC-Lavalin. The Trudeau government has maintained that there was no undue pressure or law broken, that offering SNC-Lavalin a deferred prosecution agreement (DPA) could save jobs, and that the controversy resulted from a misunderstanding and an "erosion of trust". The affair became public in February 2019, shortly after Wilson-Raybould had been shuffled to another cabinet position. Wilson-Raybould resigned from cabinet later that day. This was followed by the resignation of cabinet minister Jane Philpott, over the government's handling of the affair. In April, Wilson-Raybould and Philpott were expelled by Trudeau from the Liberal caucus; Trudeau cited concerns for division in and subsequent weakening of the Liberal party. On April 2, 2019, Wilson-Raybould, as Liberal candidate for Vancouver Granville, and Philpott, as Liberal candidate for Markham—Stouffville, were deselected as candidates.

In late August, Party deputy leader Ralph Goodale, Liberal candidate for Regina—Wascana, Lawrence MacAulay, candidate for Cardigan, and Francis Scarpaleggia, candidate for Lac-Saint-Louis, were singled out for their opposition to same-sex marriage. Pundits argued that Goodale was being hypocritical, due to his role with Scheer and the same-sex marriage incident. Goodale later stated that he had evolved on the position and wanted answers from Scheer.

On August 30, Hassan Guillet, Liberal candidate for Saint-Léonard—Saint-Michel, was dropped as a candidate following allegations of anti-Semitic comments from B'nai B'rith. Guillet's nomination previously raised concern that his ethnicity would be out of place in the majority Italian riding. Guillet denied the allegation, alleged that the Liberals were aware of the post, and that they "imposed" his replacement Patricia Lattanzio, on the riding. On September 20, Guillet announced he would run as an independent.

Sameer Zuberi, Liberal candidate for Pierrefonds—Dollard, was nominated on September 15, despite questioning Osama bin Laden's involvement in 9/11 in a social media post. Zuberi called the accusations false saying it was an attempt by the Conservatives to deflect attention away from their own candidates with extremist or white supremacist leanings.

On September 18, L'Express of Drummondville reported that the Liberal candidate for Drummond, William Morales' nomination victory was attended by two convicted criminals. Morales said that while he maintains contact with Spanish-speaking members from the Drummondville community the two people were not involved in his campaign and he does not have close relations with them. He later told his local newspaper that he interacts with members regardless of their background.

On September 18, Trudeau attracted controversy for a photograph published in Time magazine, in which he wore brownface makeup to a party at West Point Grey Academy, where he was a teacher, in 2001. Trudeau called it a mistake and apologized publicly for it. When apologizing, Trudeau also confessed to having worn similar makeup in high-school. Following his apology, an earlier instance from the early 1990s of Trudeau wearing blackface makeup was uncovered. The following day, Trudeau apologized again and said he was "not that person anymore". He also said that it should not be called "makeup" but blackface. Some commentators labelled this hypocritical, since the Liberals had exposed the past misdeeds of some Conservative candidates. Trudeau drew a mixed reaction from the public. Some were upset and contemplated changing their vote, while others defended him, such as members of minorities, minority community groups, racialized commentators and some of his opponents. Later, Trudeau announced that he wanted to apologize personally to Jagmeet Singh, who replied that he would only meet Trudeau for an apology if it was "politics-free" and private. Following the announcement, Singh received a call from Trudeau on September 24, and they talked privately for 15 to 20 minutes. In the days following the scandal, pollsters pointed out that the majority of Canadians either were not bothered by the scandal or had accepted Trudeau's apology.

On September 23, Del Arnold, Liberal candidate for Calgary Shepard, apologized to Conservative rival Tom Kmiec after spreading misleading information about his place of residence. Arnold has not apologized for a deleted tweet that accused Andrew Scheer of having links to "white supremacy" and the 2017 Unite the Right rally in Virginia.

On September 28, Judy Sgro, Liberal candidate for Humber River—Black Creek, made remarks during an interview with a radio network called GBKM FM defending Trudeau's wearing of brownface/blackface makeup: "Those in the black community have told me how much more love they have for the prime minister, that he wanted to have a black face. That he took great pride in that, too". She later apologized for her remarks, saying that "the comments I made on GBKM FM were insensitive," and further adding "I should have known better, and I apologize".

On October 13, due to a security threat, Trudeau appeared 90 minutes late to a campaign rally. Trudeau took extraordinary security precautions at the event. He wore a bulletproof vest and was surrounded by heavily armed security personnel. His wife was also supposed to introduce him, but she did not appear on stage. The Liberal Party did not reveal the nature of the threat. Scheer and Singh both showed concern for Trudeau following the threat. The following day, the RCMP was still with the Liberal leader. Furthermore, Trudeau explained that he followed advice from the RCMP and that this event will not change the way he campaigns.

On October 14, Trudeau dodged multiple questions about a possible coalition with the NDP in a minority scenario. He responded that he remains focused on winning a majority.

=== Conservative ===
About one year after he assumed office, polling showed that Ontario Premier Doug Ford of the Progressive Conservative Party of Ontario was deeply unpopular—in some cases even less popular than previous Ontario Liberal Party Premier Kathleen Wynne when she lost power, which could have deterred voters from voting for Scheer. This worried CPC insiders and prompted the Progressive Conservative Party of Ontario to call an extended recess of the provincial legislature to reduce negative news coverage, in order to help the federal Tories. If the Conservatives lost the election, Scheer pledged to blame it on Ford during his leadership review. Therefore, leading up to the campaign, Andrew Scheer distanced himself from Ford and later campaigned without him. Meanwhile, the Liberals and Scheer's opponents tried to capitalize on Ford's unpopularity by linking Scheer to the Premier multiple times.

Several CPC candidates were dropped leading to and during the course of the campaign. On April 25, Harzadan Khattra, the candidate for Dufferin—Caledon, was disqualified after a fellow contestant sent the party verifiable information about "membership buying, improper voting, and other concerns". On June 28, Salim Mansur, the candidate for London North Centre, was disqualified over alleged fears that the Liberals would characterize Mansur's record as Islamophobic. On July 10, Mark King, the candidate for Nipissing—Timiskaming, was stripped of his nomination for disputed reasons. On September 12, Cameron Ogilvie, Conservative candidate for Winnipeg North, resigned as a candidate after the party became aware of withheld social media post which the Conservative Party described as "discriminatory". On October 4, the party announced that Heather Leung, the candidate for Burnaby North—Seymour, was dropped as reports surfaced of her making anti-LGBTQ comments in a video from 2011. Due to the deadline for naming candidates having passed, her name remained on the ballot. If she were to win, she would not sit in the party's caucus. Questions were raised as to why it took the party so long to remove her, since she was "a known commodity" when she was nominated. She had made anti-LGBTQ and anti-abortion comments in the past and ignored the media for months. Her riding association had also been criticized for their controversial social media posts. On October 10, Leung claimed she was misunderstood and that her comments were lost in translation since English is her third language. However, she did not apologize for her comments.

On July 10, Cyma Musarat, Conservative candidate for Pickering—Uxbridge, faced an allegation from fellow party members that she won her nomination by using improper voting procedures. The Conservative Party faced an accusation that its headquarters had been delaying the nomination contest to find a different candidate. From July 24 to September 15, Ghada Melek attracted attention. This conservative candidate for Mississauga—Streetsville, was revealed by former organizers of the Ontario Progressive Conservative Party to have been rejected as a candidate in the provincial riding over Twitter posts about Muslim extremism. National Council of Canadian Muslims had issues over Melek's Twitter posts about Islam and LGBT+ community. Scheer accepted an apology she issued for her comments. Later, CTV News obtained her provincial vetting report and her promotion of conspiracy theories was seen as another factor behind her disqualification. When asked about the provincial party red-flagging Melek, Scheer defended her again.

On August 22, Scheer faced questions over a 2005 online video in which he spoke against same-sex marriage Scheer himself did not respond until a press conference a week later where he argued that Trudeau was raising a wedge issue; Several pundits had an issue with his response. Weeks later, Scheer was asked if he needed to apologize for his comments giving the standards he set for his candidates; however he gave no response. After Trudeau's apology regarding blackface, Scheer was asked again if he should apologize for his words; he gave no response. Scheer once again chose to not answer the question directly on popular Quebec talk show Tout le monde en parle. He said that he supports the law and the rights of Canadians, but that he will not walk in Pride parades.

Between August 26 and 30, the Conservatives were questioned on abortion. Alain Rayes, Scheer's Quebec lieutenant, attracted attention after he told a Quebec radio station that he misspoke on the party stance on abortion. A few days later, Scheer held a press conference, where he addressed the issue. However, his answers were seen as confusing in the media, and anti-abortion activists found his answers to be mixed-messaging. A day later, Scheer said that he and his cabinet would vote against anti-abortion bills if the debate is re-opened. Scheer reiterated this statement on Tout le monde en parle. A day after his rivals pushed him to clarify his position during the TVA debate, Scheer mentioned that he was pro-life but reiterated what he said in the past concerning anti-abortion bills.

On September 12, Rachel Wilson, Conservative candidate for York Centre, attracted attention after a video was posted online that called for pro-life legislation. Wilson did not comment when asked about abortion legislation. On September 13, Arpan Khanna, Conservative candidate for Brampton North, apologized after it was revealed that he offhandedly used the slur "fag" to tease a friend. On September 14, Justina McCaffrey, Conservative candidate for Kanata—Carleton, attracted attention for making negative remarks in a video about Justin Trudeau and Francophones, and her relationship with Faith Goldy. She departed a campaign event when confronted by reporters, but later released a statement apologizing for her comments and later stated that her relationship with Goldy ended a longtime ago. However, there were pictures of the two together in 2017—one of them featured Goldy doing the "OK sign". Conservative campaign manager Hamish Marshall's past role as a director of Rebel Media was also questioned, since Goldy was an on-screen personality before being fired. On October 7, the Canadian Press discovered that McCaffrey was a member of the controversial religious group Opus Dei. The CPC's spokesperson responded by saying that they do not question their candidates about their personal religious beliefs.

On September 28, The Globe and Mail revealed that they found no record of Scheer receiving the licence required by law to work as an insurance agent or broker in Saskatchewan despite him claiming so in the past. Robert Fife, the Ottawa bureau chief for The Globe and Mail, explained that Scheer was an insurance clerk. Scheer responded by saying that he did receive his accreditation, but that he left the insurance office before the licensing process was finalized. Later, the Insurance Brokers Association of Saskatchewan said that Scheer completed just one of four required courses to become an insurance broker. The IBAS declined to comment further and said that a formal complaint had been launched by Liberal MP Marco Mendicino to the General Insurance Council of Saskatchewan.

On October 3, The Globe and Mail revealed that Scheer had dual Canadian and American citizenship. The latter was obtained through his American-born father. He began the process of renouncing his US citizenship in August. Scheer confirmed that he has filed US tax returns. A party spokesperson added that he let his US passport lapse and that he has not voted in any U.S. election. The party verified that he is registered for the draft under the U.S. Selective Service System, which is a list of individuals who can be conscripted into the armed forces in the event of a national emergency. When asked why he had not previously disclosed his dual citizenship, Scheer stated that he had never been asked about it. It was seen as hypocritical since Scheer had attacked former Governor General Michaëlle Jean on this same issue and because the Conservatives had attacked Thomas Mulcair and Stéphane Dion on this issue. Scheer defended the former by stating that he was asking a question to his constituents and said that he was not leading the party at the time when it came to the latter situation. Over the next days, he refused to explain how he traveled to the United States without a valid U.S. passport. It is against the law for U.S. citizens to do so without a valid U.S. passport.

On October 11, the CBC filed an application in the Federal Court of Canada against the Conservative party over the use of television excerpts in partisan advertising. They claimed the party's use of excerpts violated the "moral rights" of news anchor Rosemary Barton and reporter John Paul Tasker. The action was brought despite the material having been taken down from websites and deleted from Twitter. The CBC said that it was given no reassurance that such use would not be repeated. The lawsuit says that the use of the material in a partisan way "diminishes the reputation" of the CBC and leaves it open to allegations that it is biased.

On October 14, Scheer ruled out any coalition or negotiations with the Bloc Québécois. He said that he "does not need to work with the Bloc Québécois to deliver results for Quebec" and that he can work with Quebec Premier François Legault to deliver them. On October 16, Scheer said that the party with most seats should have the right to form government. A day later, he stood by his claim and added that is what has happened in modern history. Journalists pointed out that it was not the case and gave examples such as the 2018 New Brunswick general election and the 2017 British Columbia general election.

On October 18 and 19, The Globe and Mail and CBC News revealed that the Conservative Party hired Warren Kinsella to "seek and destroy" the People's Party. Bernier filed a complaint to Elections Canada over what he called "a secret campaign to smear his party". Scheer did not say or deny that the Conservatives hired a consultant to destroy the PPC.

=== New Democratic Party ===
NDP candidates were dropped or stepped down during the course of the campaign. On June 20, Rana Zaman, candidate for Dartmouth—Cole Harbour, was dropped over comments about the Israeli–Palestinian conflict that the party deemed "unacceptable".

On August 16, Pierre Nantel, candidate for Longueuil—Saint-Hubert, was de-selected after reports surfaced of ongoing discussions regarding Nantel joining the Green Party of Canada. On September 11, Dock Currie, candidate for Kamloops-Thompson-Cariboo, was forced to resign over "flippant and aggressive" comments he made toward pro-pipeline activists. The next day, Olivier Mathieu, candidate for Lasalle-Emard-Verdun, stepped down following allegations of physical abuse against his ex-spouse.

During the election, Jagmeet Singh has faced questions about wearing of a turban and whether that would reduce the number of people who would vote for him. Jonathan Richardson, the former federal NDP's executive member for Atlantic Canada, who defected to the Green Party, stated in an interview with CBC Radio, that some potential NDP candidates were hesitant to run in New Brunswick, due to Singh's turban. CTV News covered a Singh event in Verner, Ontario and spoke to a number of voters there, including NDP supporters, who said that they would not vote for a leader wearing a turban. CBC News found a similar reaction in Ruth Ellen Brosseau's riding. Singh responded to these concerns. He explained some things about his turban and recorded a French ad without it to alleviate people's worries. Furthermore, according to Alexandre Boulerice, the party's Deputy Leader and Quebec lieutenant, the NDP is targeting young voters and they do not care about the turban.

On October 2, a man told Singh to cut off his turban to look more Canadian during a campaign stop. Singh replied that Canadians "look like all sorts of people" before walking off.

During the campaign, Singh talked about what he would do in a minority. On August 22, due to the controversy over Scheer's previous comments about same-sex marriage, he announced that the NDP would not support a Conservative minority government under any circumstances. On September 22, Singh announced that despite Trudeau's past brownface and blackface incidents, he would not rule out working with the Liberals in a minority scenario. On October 10, he laid out the conditions for NDP support in a minority Parliament: a national single-payer universal pharmacare plan, a national dental care plan, investments in housing, a plan to waive interest on student loans, a commitment to reduce emissions, to end subsidies for oil companies and to deliver aid to oilpatch workers to transition them out of fossil fuel industries, the introduction of a "super wealth" tax, a commitment to closing tax loopholes and reducing cellphone bills. He later added that changing the way the country votes is also a condition (Singh's NDP backs a system of mixed-member proportional representation). He added that he does not rule out supporting a pipeline-owning Liberal minority government. On October 13, Singh said he would "do whatever it takes" to keep the Tories from power, including forming a coalition government with the Liberals. He added that he is "ready to work with anyone", when he was asked about the Bloc. The following day, Singh backed off those comments and urged Canadians to vote NDP in order to receive services like universal pharmacare and dental care. Later, Singh said that coalition is not a dirty word and doubled down on his view that under no circumstance would his party support the Conservatives in a minority.

=== Bloc Québécois ===
On August 9, André Parizeau, Bloc candidate for Ahuntsic-Cartierville, created attention over his past communist affiliations as Leader of the Parti communiste du Québec (PCQ). Parizeau disavowed the PCQ in order to be accepted as candidate.

In October, the Bloc Québécois called on Quebeckers to vote for candidates "who resemble you" (" des gens qui nous ressemblent ") in the election, prompting NDP Leader Jagmeet Singh to denounce the message as unacceptable and divisive. In his closing statement during Wednesday's French-language debate, Bloc Leader Yves-François Blanchet called on voters to "opt for men and women who resemble you, who share your values, who share your concerns and who work for your interests, and only for the interests of Quebeckers." The Bloc has said the comment has nothing to do with someone's background or religion but with Québécois values. During the English debate, Blanchet called the translation of his words dishonest and mentioned that the same words were used by Igniatieff in 2011 and Mulcair in 2015.

On October 10, Le Journal de Montréal discovered that four BQ candidates had made anti-Islam and racist social media posts. A Bloc spokeswoman said it was up to Quebeckers to judge its candidates' social-media posts. The comments were condemned by Elizabeth May, Jagmeet Singh, Mélanie Joly and Françoise David. Later, the candidates all posted the same apology on their respective social media accounts and Yves-François Blanchet apologized for his candidates' Islamophobic and racist social media posts.

On October 13, Blanchet announced that they will not support a coalition or a party in a minority scenario. The Bloc will go issue by issue and support what is best for Quebec.

=== Green Party ===
Several GPC candidates were dropped or stepped down during the course of the campaign. On July 23, Brock Grills, Green candidate for Peterborough—Kawartha, stepped down for "personal reasons". Grills was accused of fraud by a former employer but he and the EDA president stated that accusation was not the reason behind his stepping down. Grills, who repeated his reasoning, also mentioned the Green Party central office "pushed" for his resignation because he was reaching out to other parties to ask them to adopt policies to curb climate change. On August 16, Luc Saint-Hilaire, Green candidate for Lévis—Lotbinière, was forced to resign because of a Facebook post demanding Boufeldja Benabdallah, co-founder of the Centre Culturel Islamique de Québec, to denounce a man who allegedly lit his ex-wife on fire. On September 12, Erik Schomann, Green candidate for Simcoe North, resigned over a 2007 Facebook post which appeared to suggest he wanted to mail pieces of a pig carcass to Muslims in support of the protesters during the Muhammed comic controversy. On October 7, Marthe Lépine, candidate in Glengarry—Prescott—Russell, was dropped over anti-abortion comments; however, as the party missed the deadline to remove her from the ballot, she remained despite being disavowed.

On September 9, the Green Party issued a statement insisting that there is "zero chance" of reopening the abortion debate; few hours after May stated the Green Party will not ban members from trying to reopen abortion debate in an interview. May later added that MPs risk being ousted if they move to reopen the debate. From September 10 to 16, attention was focused on Pierre Nantel, the candidate for Longueuil—Saint-Hubert. He created this attention over his comments about Québec separatism on a Quebec radio station. May disputed that Nantel was a Quebec sovereigntist, but Nantel contradicted her afterwards. However, May stated he could be still be a candidate. Some journalists and columnists were confused by her reasoning for keeping him as a candidate. Furthermore, May was asked by the son of the late Jack Layton to not use the latter for political points when defending Nantel. On September 10, Mark Vercouteren, the candidate for Chatham-Kent-Leamington, and Macarena Diab, the candidate for Louis-Hébert were revealed to have made "anti-abortion statements". A spokesperson defended both of them but a few days later, it was revealed by May that Vercoutern was being "re-vetted" over the party not noticing Vercouteren's questionnaires. A week after the original comments were revealed, Vercouteren stated his view aligned with the party. On September 12, Dale Dewar, Green candidate for Regina—Qu'Appelle, apologized for making past negative comments on social media about Israel, Zionism and Israelis.

On October 15, the Green Party found anti-Islam social-media posts by four of its Quebec candidates.

Starting on September 23, the GPC drew scrutiny around the world for manipulating a picture of Elizabeth May to make it seem as if she was using a reusable cup and metal straw instead of a disposable cup. When she was on Tout le monde en parle, May clarified that the original photo featured a compostable cup; the picture was modified to add the GPC's logo. She did admit that it was ridiculous that a staffer modified the picture.

Leading up to and during the campaign, May talked about what she would do in a minority. On September 3, she announced that she would not be prepared to prop up any minority government of the major parties given current climate plans. Later, on September 26, May announced that the GPC would not prop up a minority government that moves forward with the Trans Mountain pipeline expansion. In the final week of the campaign, the idea of a coalition took hold. May said that in countries with proportional representation, parties can plan to govern together before the election, but that in Canada such talk is "meaningless" due to the first-past-the-post system.

=== People's Party ===
In February 2019, LaPresse discovered that Martin Masse, the PPC's spokesperson, had written controversial blog posts in the past. The Star discovered that four members of the PPC had used racist and anti-immigrant rhetoric. They were removed from the party as a result. Bernier himself has been accused multiple times of using dog-whistle politics. Bernier responded to this by saying racists are not welcome in his party and acknowledging that Canada is a diverse country. Later, Maxime Bernier generated a reaction after a photograph of him with members of an anti-immigration group surfaced online. Bernier told the media that everyone is welcome at his events, that he is unaware of their views, that he would condemn them if the media could show that they were racists and that racists were not welcome in his party, but experts were skeptical of Bernier and thought that he was well aware of who was attending. A few weeks later, he was also reprimanded for being photographed with Paul Fromm. A spokesperson stated that Bernier had no idea who Fromm was, but once again experts were skeptical of the explanation. On September 23, news sites revealed that one of the PPC's founding members was a White nationalist and two others had ties to Anti-immigration groups. One of those founding members—a former American neo-Nazi leader—was volunteering for the party. He was also a member of the Ontario Progressive Conservative Party. He was removed from the party on August 29, after his past came to light. The PPC's spokesperson said that it did not come up during the vetting process since he came from the US. They later cited to Global News that his removal was an example of the Party taking a stand against racism. The party told Le Devoir that they did not have enough resources to vet them at the beginning of the PPC 's formation and the two other members denied having racist views.

On July 30, Cody Payant, People's candidate for Carlton Trail—Eagle Creek, attracted attention for a social media post defending Lindsay Shepherd. Payant argue that it was taken out of context. Bernier defended Payant after he spoke to Payant and was satisfied with his explanation.

On September 2, Maxime Bernier called Greta Thunberg "mentally unstable" on Twitter. A few days later, he backtracked his comments stating his intention was to criticize her role as "a spokesperson for climate alarmism" and did not mean to denigrate her. After the campaign, Bernier classified these comments as his only election regret and as a mistake.

On September 18, Steven Fletcher, People's candidate for Charleswood—St. James—Assiniboia—Headingley, denied allegations for illegally using campaign signs and voter data from the Conservative Party. Fletcher also suggested that the move was political motivated from the Conservative and took issues to the fact that the letter was leaked online. On September 19, 2019, Nancy Mercier, People's candidate for Beauséjour, raised concern from local organizations over comments about Islamism and immigration Mercier indicated her concerns are with Islamic terrorism and not members of any race. On October 10, Sybil Hogg, the candidate for Sackville-Preston-Chezzetcook, came under fire for a series of anti-Islam tweets calling Islam "pure evil" and for the religion to be banned in Canada. The PPC's executive director reached out to her to understand the context and Hogg explained that she failed to draw the distinction between "Islam" and "Islamism" or "radical Islam". She added that her concern was radical Islam and not Islam. Due to the response, the PPC said they would not take action against her. Later, Bernier called the tweets "absolutely racist and Islamophobic" and confirmed that she will not face consequences.

Several candidates were dropped or stepped down before the election. On September 6, Ken Pereira, People's candidate for Portneuf—Jacques-Cartier, stepped down because of a "terrible family tragedy". When announced as the candidate, Pereira had attracted attention for his online "anti-vaccine" and "pro-conspiracy theory" posts and was defended by the party. On September 12, Brian Misera, People's candidate for Coquitlam—Port Coquitlam, claimed that he was removed for asking Bernier to denounce racism more clearly in an online video posted on Misera's Twitter account. However, the PPC stated that Misera was removed after he allegedly admitted to the party that he was his own financial agent, a violation of Elections Canada rules. Yet a statement of Misera's disqualification obtained by City News made no reference to the PPC's claim or Misera's claim. On September 30, Chad Hudson, People's Party candidate for the Nova Scotia riding of West Nova, tweeted that he would no longer be running for the party, less than two hours before Elections Canada's deadline for candidates to officially register to be on the ballot. He criticized the party and its leadership for being "divisive", as well as "bad for democracy" and contributors to the "toxic state of politics". Hudson, later admitted that he did not notify the party of his decision. On October 8, Victor Ong, the People's Party of Canada candidate in Winnipeg North, resigned after deciding the party is "racist and intolerant".

=== Third-party organizations ===
On August 19, environmental groups were warned by Elections Canada that any third party that promotes information about climate change during the election period with paid advertising could be engaging in partisan activity. Registered charities with a charitable tax status would be required to register as a third party for the election if they engaged in any partisan activity incurring $500, which would include advertising and surveys, or risk their charitable tax status. These regulations were a result of People's Party of Canada leader Maxime Bernier expressing doubts about the legitimacy of climate change, because a third party that advertises the dangers of climate change during the election period may be considered to be indirectly advocating against the People's Party. After confusion about the warning, Elections Canada released a public statement to clarify that the prohibition applied only to advertising, not speech in general the following day.

On August 25, billboards purchased by a True North Strong & Free Advertising Corp., a third party promoting the People's Party of Canada's immigration policy, with the text "Say NO to Mass Immigration" appeared in Vancouver, Calgary, Regina, and Halifax. True North Strong & Free Advertising Corp is run by Frank Smeenk, the chief executive of a Toronto-based mining exploration company. The Peoples Party of Canada told the media that it had no contact with the group. Initially, Pattison Outdoor Advertising defended the billboards, arguing that they complied with the Advertising Standards Canada Code but later decided to pull them and said that they would review their protocols on advocacy advertising. The Pattison president later revealed that the billboards would have stayed up had True North Strong & Free identified themselves on the billboards and how the public could get in touch with them.

On October 3, the CBC revealed that the Manning Centre is a driving financial force behind a network of anti-Liberal Facebook pages pumping out political messaging and memes during the federal election campaign. Facebook pulled one of their ads due to the excess violence. The Manning Centre's donations to those groups, worth more than $300,000, are hidden, since the think tank, which did not register as a third party, does not intend to disclose them. Elections Canada says there is nothing in the law to prevent outside groups from raising money and then passing those donations along to third-party advertisers. As a result of this lack of disclosure, Democracy Watch filed a complaint to Canada's chief electoral officer. It argued that the Manning Centre should have registered as a third party. Furthermore, due to this controversy, Jean-Pierre Kingsley, the former chief electoral officer, said that the next federal government must close the gap in the law that allowed the Manning Centre to raise money and then pass it along to third-party groups without disclosing the source of those donations.

Third-party spending (from June 30, 2019, until October 1, 2019) (Note: According to Elections Canada rules, third parties are allowed to spend $1,023,400 in the pre-election period between June 30 and the start of the election campaign. They can spend an additional $511,700 during the election campaign.)
Third party (Note: These are not all the third parties that spent money during the election)	Money spent during the pre-election period	Money spent during the election campaign
Unifor	$923,417	$365,963
United Steelworkers	$739,548	$142,419
Fairness Works	$551,987	N/A
Friends of Canadian Broadcasting	$211,615	$329,372
Canadian Federation of Nurses Unions	$8,475	$412,606
Canadians United for Change	$51,557	$292,464
Canadian Medical Association	$221,709	$86,971
Grain Farmers of Ontario	$167,800	$71,250
Canadian Union of Postal Workers	$151,196	$42,225
Canada Proud	$96,677	$95,438

== Platforms ==
2019 Canada election – issues and respective party platforms
Issue	BQ	Conservative	Green	Liberal	NDP	PPC
Business	Eliminate subsidies for fossil fuel businesses.	Eliminate subsidies for fossil fuel businesses.; Eliminate subsidies for private media companies.; For every new regulation imposed, eliminate two existing regulations.	Eliminate subsidies for fossil fuel businesses.	Eliminate subsidies for fossil fuel businesses.	Eliminate subsidies for fossil fuel businesses.	Eliminate all subsidies for businesses.; Eliminate funding for the Canadian Broadcasting Corporation (CBC).
Crown corporations		Privatize the Trans Mountain pipeline.	Increase funding for the CBC.		Increase funding for the CBC.	Privatize the Trans Mountain pipeline.; Privatize Canada Post.; Privatize the CBC.
Deficit		Balance the budget in five years.	Balance the budget in five years.	Balance the budget in twenty-one years.	Oppose the use of any austerity measures in pursuit of a balanced budget.	Balance the budget in two years.
Education		Increase federal RESP contributions from 20% to 30%.	Fully fund the cost of university tuition.; Forgive federal student debts.		Remove interest from federal student loans.	
Elections			Replace Canada's electoral system with proportional representation.; Lower the voting age from 18 to 16.		Replace Canada's electoral system with proportional representation.	
Energy	Oppose all pipeline construction.	Support the construction of the Trans Mountain pipeline expansion; Support the construction of the Northern Gateway pipeline.; Repeal Impact Assessment Act and Canadian Energy Regulator Act.; Repeal Oil Tanker Moratorium Act.	Oppose all pipeline construction.; Ban fracking.; Stop all new fossil fuel projects.	Support the construction of the Trans Mountain pipeline expansion.; Oppose the construction of the Northern Gateway pipeline.	Oppose all pipeline construction.	Repeal Impact Assessment Act and Canadian Energy Regulator Act.; Repeal Oil Tanker Moratorium Act.; Invoke section 92(10) of the constitution to declare pipelines in the national interest.
Environment	Ban neonicotinoid pesticides.	Cut corporate income taxes from 15% to 5% for green technology businesses.; Ban the dumping of raw sewage into waterways.; Require heavy emitters to invest in clean technology.; Create a green-technology patent tax credit.	Ban neonicotinoid pesticides.; Protect 30% of Canada's land and water by 2030.; Ban non-renewable electricity sources by 2030.	Cut corporate income taxes from 15% to 7.5% for businesses selling zero-emission products.; Protect 25% of Canada's land and water by 2025.; Plant two billion trees by 2029.; Ban some single use plastics.	Protect 30% of Canada's land and water by 2030.; Ban some single use plastics.; Ban non-renewable electricity sources by 2030.	Eliminate subsidies for green technology.; Increase funding for climate change adaptation.
Firearms	Ban individuals with firearm licenses from owning handguns.	Classify firearms through legislation based on mechanical features and remove the RCMP's power to reclassify firearms.; Repeal Bill C-71.; Extend background checks on firearm licenses from five years to life.	Ban individuals with firearm licenses from owning semi-automatic firearms.; Ban individuals with firearm licenses from owning handguns.	Allow municipalities to ban individuals with firearm licenses from owning handguns.; Ban individuals with firearm licenses from owning AR-15s.	Allow municipalities to ban individuals with firearm licenses from owning handguns.	Classify firearms through legislation based on mechanical features and remove the RCMP's power to reclassify firearms.; Make firearm licenses permanent.
Foreign	End ties to the British monarchy.	Withdraw from the United Nations Compact on Migration.; Recognize Jerusalem as the capital of Israel.; End the practice of using foreign aid money to fund abortions.; Ban Huawei from participating in Canada's 5G networks.; Withdraw Canada's $250 million contributions to China's Asian Infrastructure Investment Bank.; Stop sending foreign aid to countries with a Human Development Index over 0.6, which will reduce the foreign aid budget by 25%.; Classify the Iran Revolutionary Guard Corps as a terrorist organization.	Stop selling weapons to Saudi Arabia.; Increase foreign aid spending to 0.7% of gross national income.; Sign and ratify The Treaty to Abolish Nuclear Weapons.; Re-establish the Canadian International Development Agency.; Increase funding to the Green Climate Fund and Global Environmental Facility to $4 billion per year.	Increase foreign aid spending to 0.7% of gross national income.; Increase funding for the United Nations.	Stop selling weapons to Saudi Arabia.; Increase foreign aid spending to 0.7 per cent of gross national income.	Withdraw from the United Nations Compact on Migration.; Withdraw from the United Nations Paris Agreement on Climate Change.; Stop pursuing a seat on the UN Security Council.; Reduce annual foreign aid spending by $5 billion.
Health		Increase healthcare funding by at least 3% per year.	Introduce government funding for prescription medications.; Introduce government funding for dental care for low-income individuals.	Increase healthcare funding by at least 3% per year.	Introduce government funding for prescription medications.; Introduce government funding for dental care.	
Housing	Increase funding for social housing in Quebec.	Increase the amortization period for insured mortgages to 30 years for first-time buyers.	Appoint a Minister of Housing.; Eliminate the first-time home buyer incentive.	Increase the amount first-time homebuyers are allowed to withdraw from their RRSPs from $25,000 to $35,000.	Build 500,000 social housing units.; Fund up to $5,000 in rental subsidies for 500,000 low-income households.	
Labour	Ban government workers in positions of authority from wearing visible religious symbols while working.		Raise the federal minimum wage to $15.; Ban non-credit unpaid internships.	Raise the federal minimum wage to $15.	Raise the federal minimum wage to $15.; Ban non-credit unpaid internships.	
Legal		Increase funding for the Youth Gang Prevention Fund by 25%.; Impose a mandatory prison sentence of five years for possession of a smuggled firearm.; Impose a prison sentence of up to fourteen years for diverting firearms into the hands of criminals.; Require individuals on parole to cut ties with gangs.; List crime and gang organizations in the Criminal Code.; Impose a mandatory prison sentence of five-year sentence for ordering or participating in violent criminal activity.; Impose a mandatory prison sentence for directing gang crime.; Start a judicial inquiry into the SNC-Lavalin scandal.; Enable the RCMP to seek access information protected by cabinet confidence by making an application to the Supreme Court of Canada.	Decriminalize all drug possession.; Eliminate mandatory minimum sentences.; End solitary confinement in prisons.; Ban consensual sexuality conversion therapy.; Legalize prostitution.	Provide free legal aid to survivors of sexual assault and domestic violence.; Only appoint bilingual Supreme Court judges.; Establish an independent Criminal Case Review Commission to review wrongfully convicted applications.; Require all judges to undertake mandatory training on sexual assault law.; Require judges to take training about unconscious bias and cultural competency for all judges.; Make drug treatment court the default sentence for first-time offenders charged exclusively with drug possession.; Ban consensual sexuality conversion therapy.	Expunge the criminal records of people guilty of minor cannabis possession.; Implement a national ban on carding.; Only appoint bilingual Supreme Court judges.; Appoint Supreme Court judges to represent Quebec.; Ban consensual sexuality conversion therapy for minors.	
Immigration	Eliminate the Safe Third Country agreement to allow Americans to apply for refugee status in Canada.; Give Quebec control over its immigration policies.; Exempt Quebec from the Multiculturalism Act.	Prevent American residents from applying for asylum or refugee status in Canada.	Eliminate the Safe Third Country agreement to allow Americans to apply for refugee status in Canada.; Eliminate the Temporary Foreign Workers Program and replace it with more permanent immigrants.	Increase the number of new immigrants from 310,000 per year to 350,000 per year by 2021.	Eliminate the Safe Third Country agreement to allow Americans to apply for refugee status in Canada.; Eliminate the cap on sponsoring parents and grandparents.	Reduce the number of new immigrants from 310,000 per year to 150,000 per year.; Increase the proportion of economic immigrants.; End reliance on UN for refugee selection.; Repeal the Multiculturalism Act.; End all funding to promote multiculturalism.; Require new immigrants to pass a test about Canadian values.; Declare the whole border an official port of entry to end exemptions for illegal border crossers.; Ban birth tourism.
Indigenous	Implement UNDRIP.	Appoint a minister for "consulting Indigenous rights holders."	Implement UNDRIP.; Repeal and replace the Indian Act.	Implement UNDRIP.	Implement UNDRIP.	Repeal and replace the Indian Act.
Military		Seek to join the U.S. ballistic missile defence system.	Do not use autonomous weapons.		Reinstate the veteran disability pension as previously provided by the Pension Act.	
Provinces and Territories	Seek sovereignty for Quebec.; Merge Quebec's federal and provincial tax returns into one tax return.	Appoint a Minister of Internal Trade.; Eliminate interprovincial trade restrictions.; Merge Quebec's federal and provincial tax returns into one tax return.			Allow unions to initiate trade disputes.	Appoint a Minister of Internal Trade.; Reduce equalization payments.; Eliminate federal funding for areas under provincial jurisdiction.; Use section 91(2) of the constitution to eliminate interprovincial trade restrictions.
Senate		Appoint senators who are members of the Conservative Party of Canada.		Appoint independent senators.	Abolish the Senate.	
Speech		Withhold grants from universities that refuse to allow free speech on campus.				Withhold grants from universities that refuse to allow free speech on campus.; Repeal M-103.; Repeal C-16.
Taxation (Business)	Implement a 3% tax on revenue from online services.	Expand the small business tax rate to businesses with more than $50,000 in annual passive income.; Exempt spouses from taxes on split income.; Implement a 3% tax on revenue from online services of businesses that have one billion dollars of revenue worldwide and $50 million of revenue in Canada.	Increase the corporate income tax from 15% to 21%.; Increase the corporate income tax for banks from 15% to 26%.; Implement a robot tax.; Implement a 3% tax on revenue from online services of businesses that have one billion dollars of revenue worldwide and $40 million of revenue in Canada.	Implement a 3% tax on revenue from online services of businesses that have one billion dollars of revenue worldwide and $40 million of revenue in Canada.	Increase the corporate income tax from 15% to 18%.	Reduce the corporate income tax rate from 15% to 10%.; Extend the Accelerated Capital Cost Allowance to all sectors.
Taxation (Personal)	Implement a tax credit for recent graduates or immigrants who move to rural areas and work there.	Eliminate the carbon tax.; Reduce the 15% income tax bracket to 13.75%.; Make EI benefits for new parents non taxable.; Implement a 15% public transit pass tax credit.; Implement a children's fitness and arts tax credit.; Eliminate GST from residential energy bills.; Lower the number of hours required for the volunteer firefighter supplies tax credit from 200 to 150.; Increase the adoption expense tax credit to $20,000 and make it fully refundable.	Remove exemptions from the carbon tax. Apply the entire carbon tax to all industries.; Implement a wealth tax.; Implement a tax on sugary drinks.; Implement a 0.2% tax on financial transactions.; Exempt medicinal cannabis from sales tax.; Exempt zero-emission vehicles from sales tax.	Raise the carbon tax by $10/tonne every year until it reaches $50/tonne.; Raise the basic personal income tax deduction to $15,000.; Implement a speculation tax on houses bought by non-residents.; Implement a 10% tax on personal vehicles valued at $100,000 or more.	Remove exemptions from the carbon tax. Apply the entire carbon tax to all industries.; Raise the capital gains inclusion from 50% to 75%.; Raise the 33% income tax bracket to 35%.; Implement a 1% wealth tax on wealth over $20,000,000.; Implement a 15% tax on houses purchased by foreign buyers.; Implement a 12% tax on personal vehicles valued at $100,000 or more.	Eliminate the carbon tax.; Abolish the capital gains tax.; Raise personal federal exemption to $15,000; Replace the current income tax brackets with two tax brackets. Tax income between $15,001 and $100,000 at 15% and income over $100,000 at 25%.; Eliminate the federal sales tax.
Trade		Ban the import of crude oil from Saudi Arabia.	Remove the Investor-State Dispute Settlement provisions from trade agreements.	Attempt to negotiate a free trade agreement with China.		Eliminate supply management for dairy, poultry and eggs.

== Misinformation ==
During the Maclean's debate, Scheer said that refugees were "jumping the queue". Journalists called this a false statement and one expert explained that "there is no queue".

On September 17, 2019, Brock Harrison, Scheer's director of communication, and the CPC tweeted that the RCMP had confirmed Trudeau was under investigation for SNC-Lavalin. Scheer himself also repeated the allegation. Both tweets were removed after journalists deemed it to be false.

A claim was circulating online that Bill Morneau was related to RCMP Commissioner Brenda Lucki through her husband, which is what was stopping the RCMP investigation regarding SNC-Lavalin. The claim is false; Lucki's husband is not related to Morneau. Furthermore, there has been no confirmation that there is an RCMP investigation.

The Buffalo Chronicle, an American fake news website, promoted a false rumour about a sex scandal that supposedly resulted in Justin Trudeau's departure from West Point Grey Academy. The rumour was propagated by other fake news websites, gossip magazines, Warren Kinsella and Ezra Levant. On October 7, 2019, the Conservatives issued a press release referencing the rumour and asking "why did Justin Trudeau leave West Point Grey Academy?". The Toronto Star and The Globe and Mail devoted multiple reporters to the story and found nothing to corroborate it. The former headmaster also released a statement that said "there is no truth to any speculation that [Trudeau] was dismissed".

During the campaign, the NDP claimed Bill Morneau had used tax-havens when he was the executive chair of Morneau Shepell, which was proven false. A probe by Canadians for Tax Fairness found that Morneau Shepell's subsidiary in the Bahamas was a legitimate business and not a way to avoid taxes. The NDP retracted the statement a few weeks after the campaign had ended.

== Leaders' debates ==
2019 Canadian general election debates
Date	Organizers	Location	Language	Moderator	P Participant A Absent invitee N Non-invitee						Source
Date	Organizers	Location	Language	Moderator	Liberals	Conservatives	NDP	Green	Bloc	People's	Source
September 12, 2019	Maclean's and Citytv	Toronto	English	Paul Wells	A	P Scheer	P Singh	P May	N	N	
October 1, 2019	Munk Debates	Roy Thomson Hall, Toronto	Bilingual	Rudyard Griffiths	Cancelled (Note: The debate was cancelled due to Trudeau refusing to attend)						
October 2, 2019	TVA	Montreal	French	Pierre Bruneau	P Trudeau	P Scheer	P Singh	N	P Blanchet	N	
October 7, 2019	Leaders' Debates Commission	Canadian Museum of History, Gatineau	English	Rosemary Barton, Susan Delacourt, Dawna Friesen, Lisa LaFlamme, Althia Raj	P Trudeau	P Scheer	P Singh	P May	P Blanchet	P Bernier	
October 10, 2019	Leaders' Debates Commission	Canadian Museum of History, Gatineau	French	Patrice Roy	P Trudeau	P Scheer	P Singh	P May	P Blanchet	P Bernier	
October 16, 2019	University of Ottawa	Ottawa	English		Cancelled (Note: The debate was cancelled due to Scheer refusing to attend)						

== Opinion polls ==
Evolution of voting intentions according to polls conducted during campaign period of the 2019 Canadian federal election, graphed from the data in the table below. Trendlines are local regressions, with polls weighted by proximity in time and a logarithmic function of sample size. 95% confidence ribbons represent uncertainty about the trendlines, not the likelihood that actual election results would fall within the intervals.

Evolution of voting intentions during the pre-campaign period of the 43rd Canadian federal election. Trendlines are local regressions, with polls weighted by proximity in time and a logarithmic function of sample size. 95% confidence ribbons represent uncertainty about the regressions, not the likelihood that actual election results would fall within the intervals. Source code for plot generation is available here.

== Results ==
Popular vote by province, with graphs indicating the number of seats won within that province or territory. (Because seats are awarded by the popular vote in each riding, the provincial popular vote does not necessarily translate to more seats.)

With 157, the Liberals won a plurality of seats in the House of Commons, allowing them to form a government albeit short of the majority government that they had won in 2015.

The Liberals, under incumbent Prime Minister Justin Trudeau won the highest number of seats, at 157, allowing them to form a minority government. The Conservatives under Andrew Scheer remained the Official Opposition and, with 121 seats, formed the largest opposition caucus in Canadian history. (Note: As the number of seats in the House of Commons has increased over time, in terms of share of seats in the House the Conservative's formed the largest opposition caucus since 1980.) The Bloc Québécois won 32 seats under Yves-François Blanchet, the party's best result since 2008, and regained official party status after losing it in 2011, while the New Democratic Party under Jagmeet Singh was reduced to 24 seats, its worst results since 2004. The Greens saw its best result in the party's history, winning 3 seats, while independent MP Jody Wilson-Raybould was re-elected in the riding of Vancouver Granville and became the first independent to win a seat since 2008. The newly created People's Party, meanwhile, lost its only seat, with party leader Maxime Bernier losing re-election in the riding of Beauce. Aside from Bernier, every major party leader was able to secure election to the House of Commons.

Marking the first time in Canadian history that no single party received more than 35% of the popular vote, the Conservatives won 34.41% of the popular vote, a plurality of the vote despite finishing 36 seats behind the Liberals, who won 33.07% of the vote. The NDP placed third in the popular vote at 15.98%, the party's worst performance since 2004, while the Bloc Québécois came in fourth with 7.69% of the popular vote, its best performance since 2008; as the Bloc Québécois vote is concentrated entirely in Quebec, however, the party placed ahead of the NDP in terms of seats despite winning less than half of the party's vote. The Greens placed fifth with 6.55% of the popular vote, while the People's Party received 1.64% in its inaugural election.

Liberal strength was predominantly concentrated in Eastern Canada and British Columbia. In Ontario, the Liberals won 79 of the province's 121 seats, with a particularly strong showing in the Golden Horseshoe, where the party was not only able to fend off expected challenges from the Conservatives and the NDP but gain the Conservative-held ridings of Kitchener—Conestoga and Milton. In Quebec, the party won 35 of the province's 78 seats, with gains from the NDP (specifically the ridings of Hochelaga, Laurier—Sainte-Marie, Outremont, and Sherbrooke) offsetting losses to the Bloc Québécois, and with the party doing particularly well on the Island of Montreal where they got their best result since 1980. In Atlantic Canada, the Liberals won 26 out of the region's 32 seats, sweeping Prince Edward Island and winning all but a single seat in both Newfoundland and Labrador and Nova Scotia. In Western Canada, the party won only 15 of the region's 104 seats, winning 11 seats in British Columbia and 4 in Manitoba and being shut out of Alberta and Saskatchewan for the first time since 2011 and 1988, respectively. The best Liberal showing in Canada's west was in British Columbia, where they won 11 out of 42 seats. The Liberals also won two of the three territories, Yukon and the Northwest Territories. (Note: Some of the information (vote share and turnout) in the previous reference is not reflective of the final results)

Conservative strength was predominantly concentrated in Western Canada, particularly in Alberta and Saskatchewan, where the party won all but one of the 48 seats between the two provinces. In British Columbia the Conservatives won 17 of the province's 42 seats, while in Manitoba the party won half the province's 14 seats, with the remainder split between the Liberals and NDP. The Conservatives increased their vote share in every district in three of those provinces (Alberta, Saskatchewan and Manitoba). However, it only resulted in a net gain of 10 seats. In Ontario the party won 36 out of the province's 121 seats, an increase of three seats compared to 2015, with losses to the Liberals in the Golden Horseshoe being offset by gains from the Liberals and NDP elsewhere in the province, though Ontario was nevertheless only one of two provinces where the Conservatives saw their share of the popular vote decrease compared to 2015. In Quebec, the second province where the Conservatives won a lower share of the popular vote than they did in 2015, the party won 10 of the province's 78 seats. In Atlantic Canada, the party was able to win 4 of the region's 32 seats after having been shut out entirely in 2015, winning 3 in New Brunswick and a single seat in Nova Scotia, though the party remained shut out of Newfoundland and Labrador and Prince Edward Island.

Only running in Quebec, the Bloc Québécois won 32 of the province's 78 seats, with the party doing particularly well in the Greater Montreal Area. Gaining seats from the Conservatives, Liberals, and in particular the NDP, compared to 2015 the party saw its share of the vote increase in all but one of the province's 78 seats, the one exception being the Montreal riding of Laurier—Sainte-Marie, where the party ran a candidate other than former party leader Gilles Duceppe for the first time in its history.

With 11 seats in British Columbia and 6 seats in Ontario, the two provinces accounted for a majority of the NDP's 24 seats, though in both provinces the party lost ground compared to 2015: in British Columbia, the party lost the ridings of Kootenay—Columbia and Port Moody—Coquitlam to the Conservatives and Nanaimo—Ladysmith to the Greens, while in Ontario the party lost Essex and Windsor—Tecumseh to the Conservatives and Liberals, respectively. In Manitoba, the party won 3 of the province's 14 seats, picking up a single seat from the Liberals, while in each of Alberta, Quebec, Newfoundland and Labrador, and Nunavut the party won a single seat, gaining the latter riding for the first time since 1980. In Alberta, Heather McPherson managed to hold the riding of Edmonton Strathcona following Linda Duncan's retirement, becoming the only non-Conservative MP in the province, while in Newfoundland and Labrador, Jack Harris returned to parliament after having been defeated in 2015, becoming the party's only MP in Atlantic Canada. In Quebec, only eight years after the Orange Wave saw the party win 59 of the province's then-75 seats, the NDP won just one of the province's 78 seats—the seat of Deputy Leader Alexandre Boulerice—as a result of losses to both the Bloc Québécois and the Liberals, with prominent MPs Ruth Ellen Brosseau, Guy Caron, and Matthew Dubé losing re-election and the party suffering its worst performance since 2008.

In addition to party leader Elizabeth May being re-elected, the Greens held the Vancouver Island riding of Nanaimo—Ladysmith, previously won from the NDP in a by-election earlier in the year, and gained the New Brunswick riding of Fredericton from the Liberals, marking the first time the party has won a seat outside of British Columbia. With three seats total, the election marked the best performance in the party's history, with May declaring on election night that the party's results marked "the best election result that any Green Party in any first past-the-post system has ever had."

Summary of the 2019 Canadian federal election – Elections Canada
Party	Party leader	Candidates	Seats					Popular vote				
Party	Party leader	Candidates	2015	Dissol.	2019	% change from dissolution	% seats	Votes	Vote change	%	pp change	% where running
Liberal	Justin Trudeau	338	184	177	157	−11.30%	46.45%	6,018,728	−924,209	33.12%	−6.34pp	33.12%
Conservative	Andrew Scheer	338 (Note: Includes Heather Leung, who was ejected from the Conservative Party after candidate registration was closed.)	99	95	121	+27.37%	35.80%	6,239,227	+625,594	34.34%	+2.43pp	34.34%
Bloc Québécois	Yves-François Blanchet	78	10	10	32	+220.00%	9.47%	1,387,030	+565,886	7.63%	+2.97pp	32.37%
New Democratic	Jagmeet Singh	338	44	39	24	−38.46%	7.10%	2,903,722	−565,646	15.98%	−3.74pp	15.98%
Green	Elizabeth May	338 (Note: Includes Marthe Lépine, who was ejected by the party, and Michael Kalmanovitch, who publicly withdrew and threw his support to the local NDP candidate, both after candidate registration was closed.)	1	2 (Note: Does not include Pierre Nantel, who sat as an independent at the dissolution of Parliament, but ran as a Green Party candidate in the 2019 election)	3	+50.00%	0.89%	1,189,607	+586,674	6.55%	+3.12pp	6.55%
Independent and No Affiliation		125	0	8 (Note: Includes Pierre Nantel, who ran as a candidate for the Green Party in the 2019 election.)	1	−87.50%	0.30%	74,291	+24,675	0.41%	+0.13pp	1.51%
People's	Maxime Bernier	315	—N/a	1	0	−100.00%	0.00%	294,092	*	1.62%	*	1.70%
Christian Heritage	Rod Taylor	51	0	0	0			18,901	+3,669	0.10%	+0.02pp	0.70%
Rhinoceros	Sébastien CoRhino	39	0	0	0			9,538	+2,275	0.05%	+0.01pp	0.45%
Libertarian	Tim Moen	24	0	0	0			8,367	−28,408	0.05%	−0.16pp	0.60%
Veterans Coalition	Randy David Joy	25	—N/a	0	0			6,300	*	0.03%	*	0.45%
Animal Alliance	Liz White	17	0	0	0			4,408	+2,709	0.02%	+0.01pp	0.44%
Marxist–Leninist	Anna Di Carlo	50	0	0	0			4,124	−4,714	0.02%	−0.03pp	0.15%
Communist	Elizabeth Rowley	30	0	0	0			3,905	−488	0.02%	–	0.22%
Pour l'Indépendance du Québec	Michel Blondin	13	—N/a	0	0			3,815	*	0.02%	*	0.49%
Progressive Canadian	Joe Hueglin	3	0	0	0			1,534	−2,942	0.01%	−0.02pp	0.83%
Marijuana	Blair Longley	4	0	0	0			920	−637	0.01%	−0.01pp	0.45%
Canada's Fourth Front	Partap Dua	7	—N/a	0	0			682	*	0.00%	*	0.20%
United Party	Carlton Darby	4	—N/a	0	0			602	*	0.00%	*	0.32%
National Citizens Alliance	Stephen J. Garvey	4	—N/a	0	0			510	*	0.00%	*	0.27%
Stop Climate Change	Ken Ranney	2	—N/a	0	0			296	*	0.00%	*	0.23%
Canadian Nationalist	Travis Patron	3	—N/a	0	0			281	*	0.00%	*	0.20%
Co-operative Commonwealth Federation (Note: Erin Weir used this as his parliamentary affiliation after being ejected from the NDP; the CCF ceased to exist as a party when the NDP was formed in 1961.)				1	—N/a							
Vacant				5	—N/a							
Total valid votes		—	—	—	—	—	—	18,170,880	+579,412	100.00%	—	—
Blank and invalid votes		—	—	—	—	—	—	179,479	+58,964	0.98%	+0.30pp	—
Total		2,146	338	338	338	—	100.00%	18,350,359	+580,480	100.00%	—	100.00%
Registered voters/turnout		—	—	—	—	—	—	27,373,058	+1,433,316	67.03%	−1.25pp	—
Source: Elections Canada (Official Voting Results)

Cartogram of the 2019 Canadian federal election results using equal-area ridings

=== Results by province ===
Distribution of seats and popular vote %, by party by province/territory (2019)
Party name		BC	AB	SK	MB	ON	QC	NB	NS	PE	NL	YT	NT	NU	Total
Liberal	Seats:	11	–	–	4	79	35	6	10	4	6	1	1	–	157
Liberal	Vote:	26.2	13.8	11.7	26.5	41.6	34.3	37.5	41.4	43.7	44.9	33.5	39.7	30.9	33.1
Conservative	Seats:	17	33	14	7	36	10	3	1	–	–	–	–	–	121
Conservative	Vote:	34.0	69.0	64.0	45.2	33.1	16.0	32.8	25.7	27.3	27.9	32.7	25.5	26.1	34.3
NDP	Seats:	11	1	–	3	6	1	–	–	–	1	–	–	1	24
NDP	Vote:	24.4	11.6	19.6	20.8	16.8	10.8	9.4	18.9	7.6	23.7	22.0	22.3	40.8	16.0
Bloc Québécois	Seats:						32								32
Bloc Québécois	Vote:						32.4								7.6
Green	Seats:	2	–	–	–	–	–	1	–	–	–	–	–	–	3
Green	Vote:	12.5	2.8	2.6	5.1	6.2	4.5	17.2	11.0	20.9	3.1	10.5	10.6	2.2	6.5
People's	Seats:	–	–	–	–	–	–	–	–	–	–	–	–	–	–
People's	Vote:	1.7	2.2	1.8	1.7	1.6	1.5	2.0	1.2	–	0.1	1.4	1.8	–	1.6>
Independents and minor parties	Seats:	1	–	–	–	–	–	–	–	–	–	–	–	–	1
Independents and minor parties	Vote:	1.3	0.5	0.2	0.6	0.2	0.1	1.1	1.8	0.5	0.2	–	–	–	0.2
Seats:		42	34	14	14	121	78	10	11	4	7	1	1	1	338

=== Analysis ===
Ternary plots - shift of electoral support (2015-2019)
2015

2019
Electoral districts identified by colours of winning parties

Vote-splitting benefited the Conservatives in Ontario and Metro Vancouver, the Liberals in Quebec and the Maritimes, and the NDP in British Columbia and outside the GTA in Ontario. It also helped the Bloc in some Quebec ridings. Furthermore, analysis by different news outlets showed that the PPC cost the Tories six to seven seats. However, a Tory strategist said that it is not guaranteed that PPC voters would have voted for the Conservatives. The PPC's spokesperson echoed similar sentiments.

Strategic voting was prominent across the country. However, it was not the primary factor for most. According to a poll conducted after the election, of respondents who ultimately voted Liberal, 46 per cent said they had considered voting for the NDP at some point during the campaign. Another 29 per cent considered voting Green. Additionally, 15 per cent of Conservative voters considered voting for the People's Party.

Ninety-eight women were elected to federal seats in this election. This also set a new record, both by number and by percentage, but still fell short of equality advocates' goal of 30% women. The highest percentage of elected women was in the Green party, with two female MPs out of three elected Green Party members.

=== Canadian Election Study ===
The 2019 CES included two survey components. Both included two waves of questions, one in the campaign period (CPS) and a recontact wave after the election (PES).

The non-probability online survey included a sample of Canadians from across the country (CPS n=37,822; PES n=10,337). The goal was to gather enough data to allow for constituency-level analysis as well as proper subgroup analysis of populations that are typically underrepresented in the CES.

The RDD internet survey largely replicated the larger online study, although it contained fewer questions and has a smaller sample (CPS n=4,021; PES n=2,889).

In both surveys, the core questions were drawn from previous CES (to preserve continuity) on key issues such as vote intentions, issue positions, partisanship, and political engagement.

The 2019 Canadian Election Study was led by Laura Stephenson, Allison Harell, Daniel Rubenson and Peter Loewen.

The table below is the indicated vote choice in the 2019 election from the PES, cross-tabbed with demographic questions. The weights have been adjusted to match the actual results of the election.

==== Demographics ====
Demographic subgroup	LPC	CPC	NDP	BQC	GPC	PPC	Other	Sample
Total vote	33.1	34.3	16.0	7.6	6.5	1.6	0.2	10,337
Gender
Men	32.6	37.6	12.0	9.4	5.4	1.7	1.2	3,901
Women	33.7	31.3	19.7	5.9	7.6	1.5	0.3	4,058
Age
18-29	34.8	22.7	28.3	4.9	7.7	1.6	0.0	1,101
30-39	33.3	30.8	19.2	6.0	7.0	2.9	0.7	1,551
40-49	30.2	36.1	16.0	6.7	7.9	1.7	1.4	1,275
50-59	32.0	36.0	13.3	8.9	6.8	1.8	1.2	1,247
60-69	33.4	38.0	11.3	10.7	5.1	1.0	0.6	1,577
70-79	35.4	37.6	10.4	10.2	5.2	0.7	0.7	738
80+	34.9	46.1	8.8	4.5	5.1	0.4	0.3	494
Language
English	34.2	38.2	17.3	0.8	7.0	1.6	0.8	6,656
French	27.8	15.0	9.4	41.8	4.1	1.7	0.3	1,327
Highest education attainment
High school or less	29.5	36.0	15.1	10.1	6.6	1.9	0.7	3,982
College	30.5	37.6	17.7	5.3	6.5	1.7	0.6	1,824
University	41.9	28.4	16.1	5.0	6.5	1.1	1.0	2,169
Religion
Atheist	32.6	27.3	21.4	7.6	9.1	1.3	0.7	2,231
Agnostic	34.5	22.4	23.7	4.6	11.1	3.2	0.6	523
Buddhist	35.3	24.6	30.0	1.2	4.4	1.8	2.6	73
Hindu	39.7	36.2	13.5	0.0	10.6	0.0	0.0	37
Jewish	46.2	43.2	7.9	0.0	1.9	0.8	0.0	112
Muslim/Islam	81.1	10.0	8.1	0.0	0.8	0.0	0.0	115
Sikh	50.6	22.3	23.2	0.0	2.0	1.9	0.0	37
Christian	31.9	39.5	12.5	9.3	4.7	1.5	0.6	4,274
Catholic	34.5	31.3	12.2	16.2	4.0	1.1	0.6	2,297
Protestant & other Christian	28.8	48.9	12.8	1.4	5.4	1.9	0.7	1,977
Other religion	30.7	36.1	14.4	1.6	8.9	4.0	4.2	231
Ethnicity
Indigenous	26.6	36.8	25.2	2.1	6.3	1.6	1.4	390
European	31.7	34.1	15.8	9.3	6.5	1.7	0.9	6,272
Chinese	40.7	39.9	9.8	0.4	8.3	0.3	0.6	278
Hispanic	46.6	25.2	14.6	0.6	9.4	1.5	2.1	86
Indian	52.7	30.9	12.4	0.0	2.0	1.9	0.0	120
Other	39.1	30.7	19.0	1.0	7.4	1.9	0.9	1,071
Income
0-30,000	31.8	27.1	20.3	9.5	8.5	2.6	0.3	1,161
30,001-60,000	32.8	31.0	16.9	9.3	7.6	1.7	0.8	2,038
60,001-90,000	32.0	36.6	15.2	8.6	5.6	1.2	0.7	1,848
90,001-110,000	33.6	36.2	17.6	4.4	5.6	2.0	0.5	806
110,001-150,000	36.3	38.2	12.5	5.6	6.0	1.2	0.3	1,004
150,001-200,000	35.1	41.1	9.7	4.4	5.8	2.0	1.8	402
>200,000	33.4	42.2	8.6	5.6	5.9	0.4	4.1	235
Home ownership
Own a residence	32.5	38.9	13.3	6.9	6.1	1.4	0.8	5,483
Don't own a residence	34.5	24.3	21.8	9.2	7.4	2.0	0.7	2,500
Do you live in...
A rural area or village	24.4	45.0	13.3	5.7	7.5	2.2	1.9	849
A town	26.0	37.8	15.8	11.4	6.4	2.2	0.5	1,059
A suburb	39.1	31.1	14.1	7.4	6.6	1.3	0.5	908
A city	36.2	31.4	17.9	6.1	6.4	1.3	0.8	1,875
Marital status
Married	32.4	41.9	12.6	4.8	5.8	1.7	0.7	3,663
Not married	33.7	27.8	18.7	10.1	7.2	1.6	0.8	4,276
Do you have children?
Yes	30.9	39.8	12.9	8.1	5.8	1.6	0.9	4,607
No	36.1	26.7	20.4	6.9	7.6	1.7	0.6	3,343
Employment
Full-time	33.2	34.1	16.3	7.3	6.4	1.5	1.1	3,476
Part-time	37.1	28.3	19.2	5.8	7.7	1.7	0.3	618
Self employed	31.6	38.5	11.7	4.9	9.5	3.4	0.4	459
Retired	33.7	38.6	10.9	10.2	5.0	0.9	0.7	2,197
Unemployed	28.5	33.6	21.5	3.9	8.0	4.1	0.3	286
Student	32.4	15.8	34.1	6.7	10.7	0.3	0.0	229
Caregiver/homemaker	22.6	39.7	20.3	6.4	6.7	4.2	0.0	244
Disabled	32.2	31.8	20.1	6.3	6.8	2.1	0.8	260
Do you belong to a union?
Yes	34.3	28.6	21.5	7.3	6.1	1.5	0.8	1,470
No	32.9	35.8	14.6	7.7	6.7	1.6	0.8	6,468

== Election aftermath ==
Following the election, Trudeau ruled out a coalition and announced that his new cabinet would be sworn in on November 20, 2019. On November 4, 2019, Elizabeth May announced that she would be stepping down as leader of the Green Party. On December 12, 2019, Andrew Scheer announced that he was resigning as leader of the Conservative Party.

=== Recounts ===
Defeated parties sought recounts in three ridings where the races were won by a few hundred votes. The Bloc Québécois made its request in the Quebec Superior Court for the ridings of Hochelaga and Québec and the NDP sought a recount for the riding of Port Moody—Coquitlam. Federal judges accepted the requests and ruled that recounts should happen for those ridings. All three recount requests were withdrawn during the recounting process, thus the victors stayed the same.

=== Electoral reform ===
The nature of the elections' results reignited calls for electoral reform. Some commentators argued against the current first-past-the-post system, while others defended it. Dominic O'Sullivan, Associate Professor of Political Science at Charles Sturt University, argued that Canada should follow in New Zealand's footsteps with their electoral reform. News outlets also published articles showing what the election results could have looked like if Trudeau had kept his promise on electoral reform.

After the election, Elizabeth May sent Prime Minister Justin Trudeau a letter recommending STV as a compromise for electoral reform since it meets some of the concerns Trudeau expressed in the past.

A poll published by the Angus Reid Institute showed that support for electoral reform and proportional representation in particular skyrocketed following the election.

=== Western Canadian separatism ===
After Justin Trudeau's re-election on October 21, 2019, #Wexit trended on social media. However, experts stated part of the push was due to disinformation and bots. On November 4, 2019, the separatist group Wexit Alberta applied for federal political party status. On November 6, 2019, a poll conducted by Ipsos show a historic high level of interest in secession from Canada in both Alberta and Saskatchewan by 33% and 27%, respectively. On January 12, 2020, Wexit Canada was granted eligibility for the next federal election. They subsequently changed their name to the Maverick Party.

=== Chinese government interference ===
In late 2022, Global News reported on a suspected attempt by the government of China to infiltrate the Parliament of Canada by funding a network of candidates to run in the 2019 federal election. Prime Minister Justin Trudeau stated on November 20, 2022, regarding alleged interference in the election that "I do not have any information, nor have I been briefed on any federal candidates receiving any money from China". In February 2023, the Canadian Security Intelligence Service (CSIS) concluded that the Chinese government interfered in the 2019 elections.

=== Deregistered parties ===
The Progressive Canadian Party was deregistered by Elections Canada on October 30, 2019, for failing to comply with the reporting provisions of the Canada Elections Act.

The United Party of Canada was deregistered on December 31, 2020, for failing to submit required financial documents or update party information.

The Stop Climate Change Party was deregistered on March 31, 2021, for failing to provide an auditor's report.

== Student vote results ==
Student votes are mock elections that run parallel to actual elections, in which students not of voting age participate. They are administered by Student Vote Canada. Student vote elections are for educational purposes and do not count towards the results. Though there are 338 ridings in Canada, 341 were declared, as there were ties in three ridings.

Summary of the 2019 Canadian student vote
Party	Leader	Seats		Popular vote	
Party	Leader	Elected	%	Votes	%
Liberal	Justin Trudeau	109	31.96	259,817	22.34
New Democratic	Jagmeet Singh	101	29.62	288,985	24.84
Conservative	Andrew Scheer	92	26.98	291,603	25.07
Green	Elizabeth May	27	7.92	210,314	18.08
Bloc Québécois	Yves-François Blanchet	12	3.52	16,181	1.39
People's	Maxime Bernier	0	0	48,310	4.15
Other		0	0	47,974	4.13
Total		338 + 3	100.00	1,163,184	100.00
Source: Student Vote Canada

== See also ==
- By-elections to the 42nd Canadian Parliament
- 2017 Conservative Party of Canada leadership election
- 2017 New Democratic Party leadership election
- 2017 Bloc Québécois leadership election
- 2019 Bloc Québécois leadership election
- 2019 Canadian federal election in Alberta
- 2019 Canadian federal election in British Columbia
- 2019 Canadian federal election in Ontario
- 2019 Canadian federal election in Quebec
- 2019 Canadian federal election in Newfoundland and Labrador
