= 2019 Canadian federal election in Newfoundland and Labrador =

- October 21, 2019

7 Newfoundland and Labrador seats in the House of Commons
- Turnout: 58.8% (▼2.3pp)
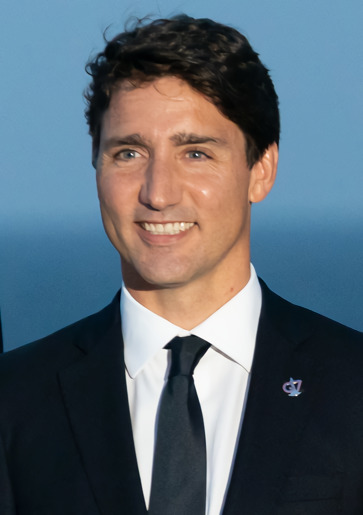

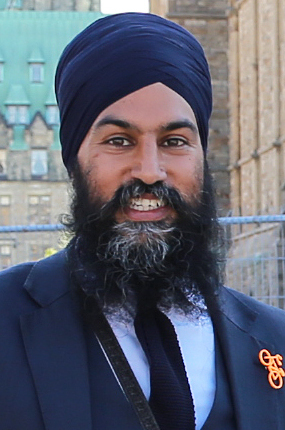

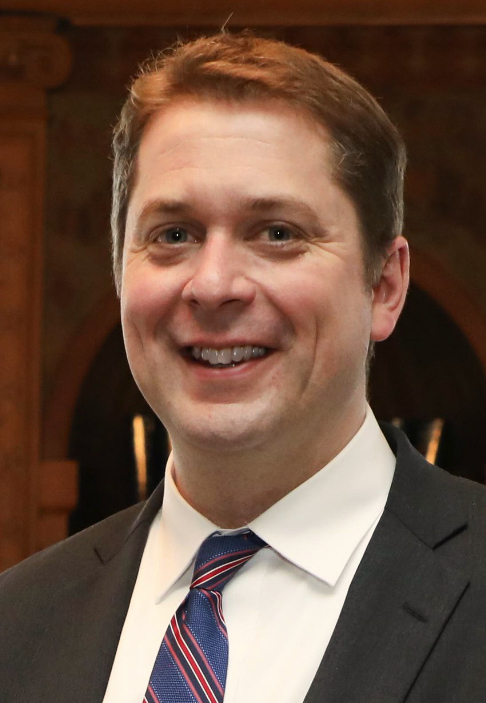
	First party	Second party	Third party
Leader	Justin Trudeau	Jagmeet Singh	Andrew Scheer
Party	Liberal	New Democratic	Conservative
Leader since	April 14, 2013	October 1, 2017	May 27, 2017
Last election	7 seats, 64.49%	0 seats, 21.10%	0 seats, 10.32%
Seats before	7	0	0
Seats won	6	1	0
Seat change	▼1	▲1	Steady
Popular vote	109,148	57,664	59,821
Percentage	46.42%	24.52%	25.44%
Swing	▼18.07pp	▲3.42pp	▲15.12pp

The 2019 Canadian federal election in Newfoundland and Labrador was held on October 21, 2019 in the 7 electoral districts in the province of Newfoundland and Labrador.

The Liberal Party, led by Justin Trudeau, won 6 of the province's 7 seats, losing one seat to the New Democratic Party and seeing a significant decrease in its share of the popular vote. The Conservative Party, led by Andrew Scheer, did not win any seats but placed second in the popular vote.

== Results ==
=== Summary results ===
Party	Votes			Seats	
Liberal	109,148	46.42%	▼18.07pp	6 / 7 (86%)	▼1
New Democratic	57,664	24.52%	▲3.42pp	1 / 7 (14%)	▲1
Conservative	59,821	25.44%	▲15.12pp	0 / 7 (0%)	0
Green	7,617	3.24%	▲2.06pp	0 / 7 (0%)	0
Independent	887	0.38%	▼2.63pp	0 / 7 (0%)	0

=== Full results ===
Summary of the 2019 Canadian federal election in Newfoundland and Labrador - Elections Canada
Party	Party leader	Candidates	Seats					Popular vote				
Party	Party leader	Candidates	2015	Dissol.	2019	% change from dissolution	% seats	Votes	Vote change	%	pp change	% where running
Liberal	Justin Trudeau	7	7	7	6	−14.29%	85.71%	109,148	−56,270	46.42%	−18.07pp	46.42%
New Democratic	Jagmeet Singh	7	0	0	1	+14.29%	14.29%	57,664	+3,544	24.52%	+3.42pp	24.52%
Conservative	Andrew Scheer	7	0	0	0			59,821	+33,352	25.44%	+15.12pp	25.44%
Green	Elizabeth May	7	0	0	0			7,617	+4,845	3.24%	+2.06pp	3.24%
Veterans Coalition	Randy David Joy	1	—N/a	0	0			411	*	0.17%	*	1.07%
People's	Maxime Bernier	1	—N/a	0	0			335	*	0.14%	*	0.82%
Christian Heritage	Rod Taylor	1	0	0	0			141	*	0.06%	*	0.35%
Blank and invalid votes		—	—	—	—	—	—	3,611	+2,726	1.51%	+0.46pp	—
Total		31	7	7	7	—	100.00%	238,748	-20,777	100.00%	—	100.00%
Registered voters/turnout		—	—	—	—	—	—	416,095	-1,374	57.38%	−4.79pp	—
Source: Elections Canada (Official Voting Results)

== Ridings ==
Margin of victory in each riding.

=== Avalon ===
==== Candidates ====
- Matthew Chapman, teacher from Paradise (Conservative)
- Greg Malone, comedian from St. John's (Green)
- Ken McDonald, incumbent MP from Conception Bay South (Liberal)
- Lea Mary Movelle, activist from St. John's (NDP)

==== Results ====
2019 Canadian federal election: Avalon
Party	Candidate	Votes	%	±%	Expenditures
Liberal	Ken McDonald	19,122	46.26	−9.64	$63,518.25
Conservative	Matthew Chapman	12,855	31.10	+20.00	$37,082.47
New Democratic	Lea Mary Movelle	7,142	17.28	+2.85	none listed
Green	Greg Malone	2,215	5.36	+4.82	none listed
Total valid votes/expense limit		41,334	99.05	-0.57	$104,436.05
Total rejected ballots		397	0.95	+0.57	
Turnout		41,731	59.33	−2.36	
Eligible voters		70,341			
Liberal hold		Swing		−14.82	
Source: Elections Canada

=== Bonavista—Burin—Trinity ===
==== Results ====
2019 Canadian federal election: Bonavista—Burin—Trinity
Party	Candidate	Votes	%	±%	Expenditures
Liberal	Churence Rogers	14,707	45.70	-23.52	$23,874.25
Conservative	Sharon Vokey	12,697	39.46	+16.65	none listed
New Democratic	Matthew Cooper	3,855	11.98	+7.25	$6.68
Green	Kelsey Reichel	920	2.86	+1.80	none listed
Total valid votes/expense limit		32,179	98.14	-1.42	107,548.45
Total rejected ballots		609	1.85	+1.43	
Turnout		32,788	55.83	+34.28	
Eligible voters		58,729			
Liberal hold		Swing		-20.09	
Source: Elections Canada

=== Coast of Bays—Central—Notre Dame ===
==== Results ====
2019 Canadian federal election: Coast of Bays—Central—Notre Dame
Party	Candidate	Votes	%	±%	Expenditures
Liberal	Scott Simms	16,514	48.31	-26.52	$48,943.91
Conservative	Alex Bracci	12,081	35.34	+17.02	none listed
New Democratic	Noel Joe	4,224	12.36	+6.26	$6,009.07
Green	Byron White	1,363	3.99	+3.24	$5,899.33
Total valid votes/expense limit		34,182	97.80	-1.79	120,385.86
Total rejected ballots		770	2.20	+1.79	
Turnout		34,952	55.59	-0.12	
Eligible voters		62,880			
Liberal hold		Swing		-26.51	
Source: Elections Canada

=== Labrador ===
==== Results ====
2019 Canadian federal election: Labrador
Party	Candidate	Votes	%	±%	Expenditures
Liberal	Yvonne Jones	4,851	42.48	-29.27	$82,443.39
Conservative	Larry Flemming	3,548	31.07	+17.20	$19,580.39
New Democratic	Michelene Gray	2,796	24.49	+10.11	$2,811.15
Green	Tyler Colbourne	224	1.96	–	$0.00
Total valid votes/expense limit		11,419	98.80	-0.77	104,476.76
Total rejected ballots		139	1.20	-0.78	
Turnout		11,558	57.26	-4.73	
Eligible voters		20,184			
Liberal hold		Swing		-23.24	
Source: Elections Canada

=== Long Range Mountains ===
==== Results ====
2019 Canadian federal election: Long Range Mountains
Party	Candidate	Votes	%	±%	Expenditures
Liberal	Gudie Hutchings	18,199	47.36	-26.49	$67,837.53
Conservative	Josh Eisses	10,873	28.30	+16.14	none listed
New Democratic	Holly Pike	7,609	19.80	+8.47	$43.82
Green	Lucas Knill	1,334	3.47	+0.81	$533.12
Veterans Coalition	Robert Miles	411	1.06	–	none listed
Total valid votes/expense limit		38,426	98.52	-1.22	122,089.44
Total rejected ballots		576	1.48	+1.22	
Turnout		39,002	56.21	-2.82	
Eligible voters		69,385			
Liberal hold		Swing		-26.49	
Source: Elections Canada

=== St. John's East ===
==== Results ====
2019 Canadian federal election: St. John's East
Party	Candidate	Votes	%	±%	Expenditures
New Democratic	Jack Harris	21,148	46.92	+1.63	none listed
Liberal	Nick Whalen	14,962	33.20	−13.54	none listed
Conservative	Joedy Wall	8,141	18.06	+11.52	$56,419.96
Green	David Peters	821	1.82	+0.71	$0.00
Total valid votes/expense limit		45,072	99.84		$101,886.12
Total rejected ballots		528	1.16	+0.91	
Turnout		45,600	67.65	-0.21	
Eligible voters		67,406			
New Democratic gain from Liberal		Swing		+7.58	
Source: Elections Canada

=== St. John's South—Mount Pearl ===
==== Results ====
2019 Canadian federal election: St. John's South—Mount Pearl
Party	Candidate	Votes	%	±%	Expenditures
Liberal	Seamus O'Regan	20,793	51.13	−6.73	$58,125.56
New Democratic	Anne Marie Anonsen	10,890	26.78	−9.98	$25,130.37
Conservative	Terry Martin	7,767	19.10	+14.53	$56,978.54
Green	Alexandra Hayward	740	1.82	+1.01	$0.00
People's	Benjamin Ruckpaul	335	0.82	–	none listed
Christian Heritage	David Jones	141	0.35	–	none listed
Total valid votes/expense limit		40,666	98.57		$100,487.58
Total rejected ballots		592	1.43	+1.13	
Turnout		41,258	61.42	−5.71	
Eligible voters		67,170			
Liberal hold		Swing		+1.62	
Source: Elections Canada
