= 2019 Canadian federal election in Ontario =

- October 21, 2019

All 121 Ontario seats in the House of Commons
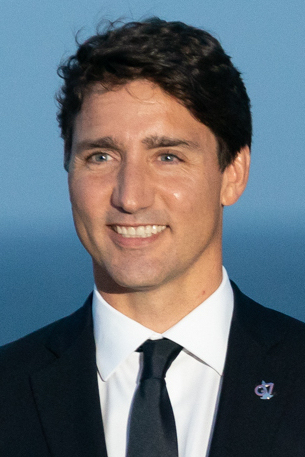

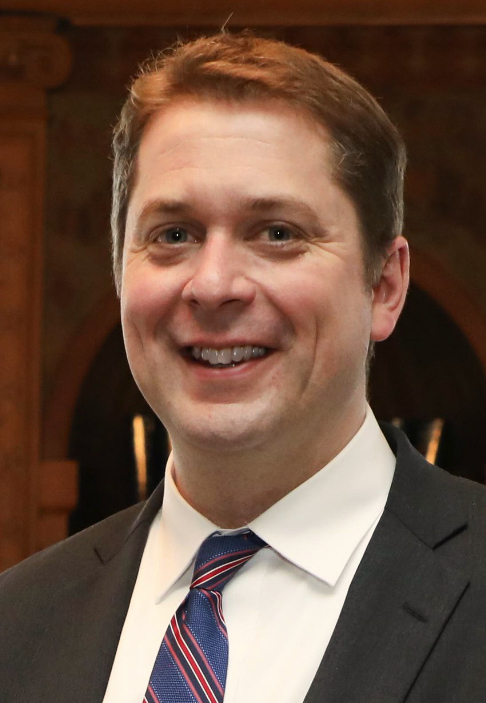

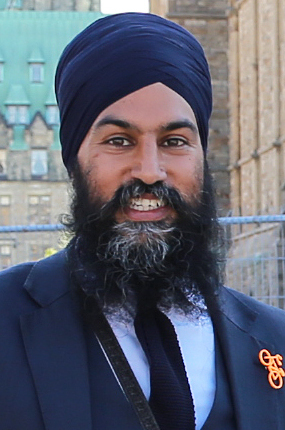

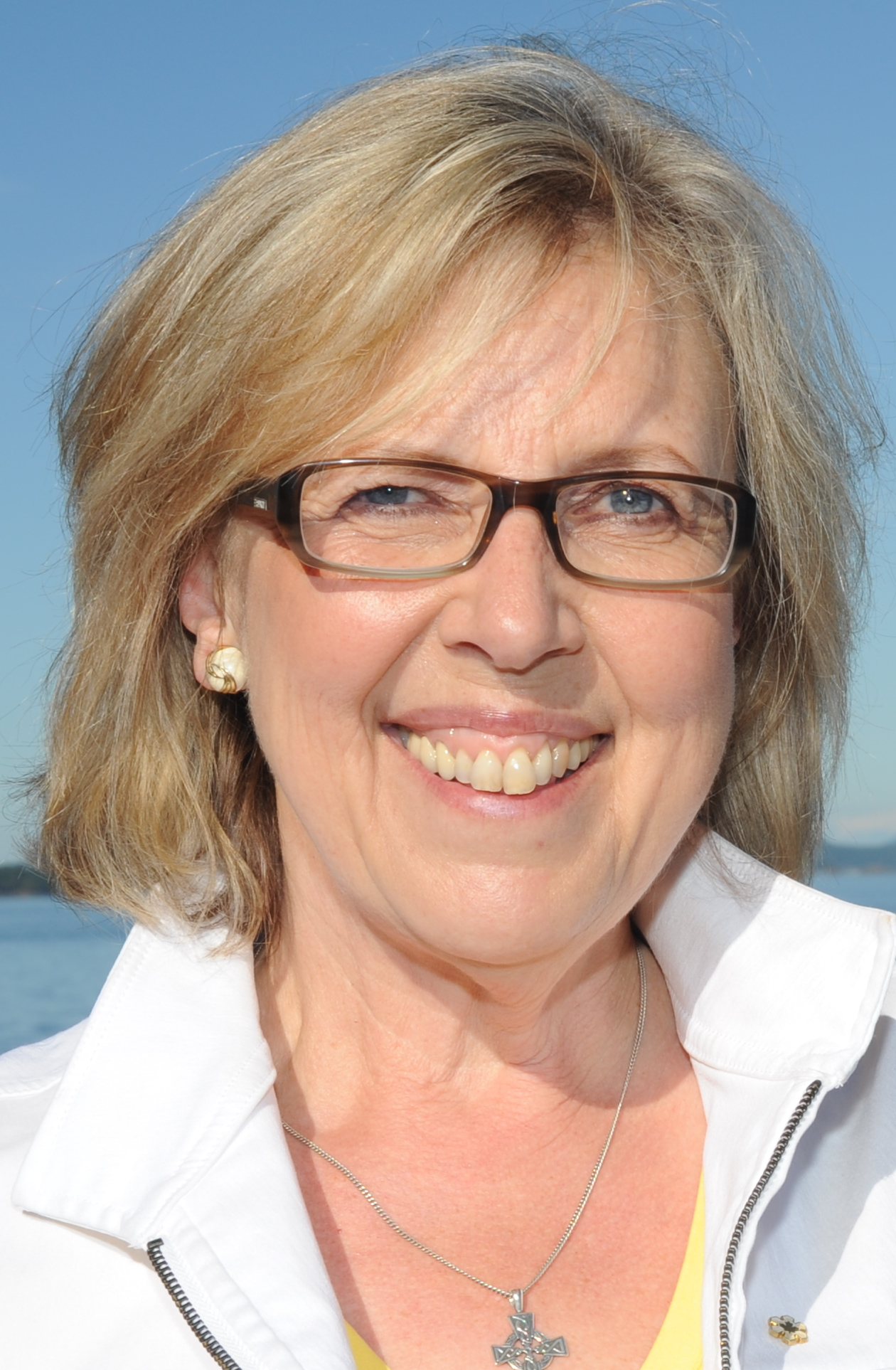
	First party	Second party
Leader	Justin Trudeau	Andrew Scheer
Party	Liberal	Conservative
Leader since	April 14, 2013	May 27, 2017
Last election	80 seats, 44.8%	33 seats, 35.0%
Seats before	77	34
Seats won	79	36
Seat change	▲2	▲2
Popular vote	2,814,010	2,252,238
Percentage	41.5%	33.2%
Swing	▼3.3pp	▼1.8pp
	Third party	Fourth party
Leader	Jagmeet Singh	Elizabeth May
Party	New Democratic	Green
Leader since	October 1, 2017	August 27, 2006
Last election	8 seats, 16.6%	0 seats, 2.9%
Seats before	8	0
Seats won	6	0
Seat change	▼2	Steady
Popular vote	1,138,735	420,397
Percentage	16.8%	6.2%
Swing	▲0.2pp	▲3.3pp

The 2019 Canadian federal election in Ontario was held on Monday, October 21 across 121 electoral districts within Ontario, as part of the 2019 Canadian federal election.

== Results ==
=== Summary ===
The Liberal Party had slight losses compared to 2015, winning 79 seats and 41.5% of the popular vote. The Conservatives made gains in their seat count, winning 36 seats. But their popular vote fell slightly to 33.2%. The NDP went down to 6 seats and got 16.8% of the vote.

The Greens failed to win a seat in Ontario but increased their vote share to 6.2%. The People's Party won no seats and achieved 1.6% of the vote.

Independent Jane Philpott, who had left the Liberal Party, failed to win re-election. The Animal Protection Party, Canada's Fourth Front, the Canadian Nationalist Party, the Christian Heritage Party, the Communist Party, the Libertarian Party, the Marijuana Party, the Marxist Leninist Party, the Rhino Party, the Progressive Canadian Party, the Stop Climate Change party, The United Party, and the Veterans Coalition Party, all ran candidates in Ontario in this election.

Summary results
Party	Votes			Seats	
Liberal	2,814,010	41.5%	▼3.3pp	79 / 121 (65%)	▲2
Conservative	2,252,238	33.2%	▼1.8pp	36 / 121 (30%)	▲3
New Democratic	1,138,735	16.8%	▲0.2pp	6 / 121 (5%)	▼2
Green	420,397	6.2%	▲3.3pp	0 / 121 (0%)	-
People's	107,673	1.6%	▲1.6pp	0 / 121 (0%)	-
Independent	53,989	0.7%	▲0.5pp	0 / 121 (0%)	-
Seat apportionment diagram:

== Analysis ==
The Liberals retained a majority of seats in Ontario, with a net decrease of 1 seat. Of the Liberal Seats lost, only 1, Aurora—Oak Ridges—Richmond Hill was within the Greater Toronto Area.

The Conservatives made small seat gains, but lost support in the GTA, with the Deputy Leader of the Opposition Lisa Raitt losing her seat of Milton.

The New Democrats remained similar in vote share to 2015, with the party losing 2 Seats in Essex County, Ontario, Windsor—Tecumseh and Essex.

The Green Party increased its share of the vote but failed to make any gains. They placed second in the ridings of Guelph and Kitchener Centre.
