= 2019 Canadian federal election in Alberta =

- October 21, 2019

All 34 Albertan seats in the House of Commons
- Registered: 3,023,980
- Turnout: 2,093,981 (69.2%)
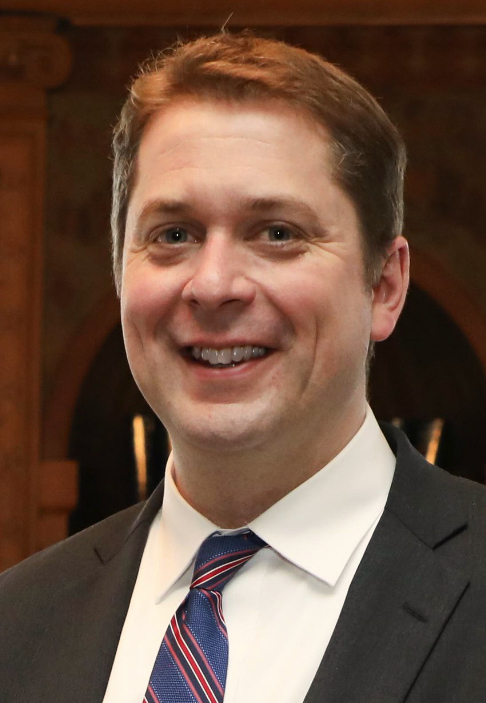

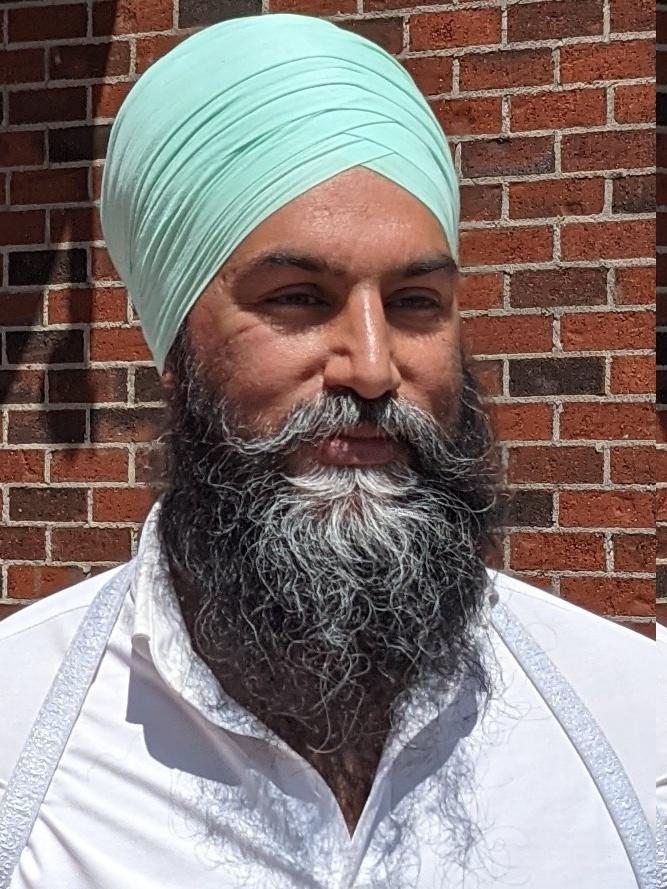

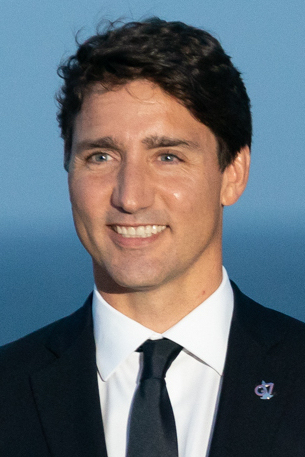
	First party	Second party	Third party
Leader	Andrew Scheer	Jagmeet Singh	Justin Trudeau
Party	Conservative	New Democratic	Liberal
Leader since	May 27, 2017	October 1, 2017	April 14, 2013
Last election	29 seats, 59.5%	1 seats, 11.6	4 seats, 24.6%
Seats before	28	1	3
Seats won	33	1	0
Seat change	▲5	0	▼3
Popular vote	1,438,233	241,376	288,010
Percentage	69.0%	11.6%	13.8%
Swing	▲9.5%	0%	▼10.8%
Prime minister before election
Justin Trudeau
Liberal
Prime minister after election
Justin Trudeau
Liberal

In the 2019 Canadian federal election, 34 members of Parliament were elected to the House of Commons from the province of Alberta making up 10.1% of all members.

== Timeline ==
Seat	Before				Change		
Seat	Date	Member	Party	Reason	Date	Member	Party
Medicine Hat—Cardston—Warner	March 23, 2016	Jim Hillyer	█ Conservative	Death in office	October 24, 2016	Glen Motz	█ Conservative
Calgary Heritage	August 26, 2016	Stephen Harper	█ Conservative	Resignation	April 3, 2017	Bob Benzen	█ Conservative
Calgary Midnapore	September 23, 2016	Jason Kenney	█ Conservative	Resignation	April 3, 2017	Stephanie Kusie	█ Conservative
Calgary Skyview	August 31, 2017	Darshan Kang	█ Liberal	Resigned from caucus			█ Independent
Calgary Forest Lawn	August 2, 2019	Deepak Obhrai	█ Conservative	Death in office			█ Vacant

== Predictions ==
Polling firm	Last date of polling	Link	LPC	CPC	NDP	BQ	GPC	PPC^{[1]}	Other	Margin of error (Note: In cases when linked poll details distinguish between the margin of error associated with the total sample of respondents (including undecided and non-voters) and that of the subsample of decided/leaning voters, the former is included in the table. Also not included is the margin of error created by rounding to the nearest whole number or any margin of error from methodological sources. Most online polls (because of their opt-in method of recruiting panelists which results in a non-random sample) cannot have a margin of error. In such cases, shown is what the margin of error would be for a survey using a random probability-based sample of equivalent size.)	Sample size (Note: Refers to the total, "raw" sample size, including undecided and non-voters, and before demographic weighting is applied. Fractions in parentheses apply to rolling polls (see below) and indicate the proportion of the sample that is independent from the previous poll in the series.)	Polling method (Note: "Telephone" refers to traditional telephone polls conducted by live interviewers; "IVR" refers to automated Interactive Voice Response polls conducted by telephone; "online" refers to polls conducted exclusively over the internet; "telephone/online" refers to polls which combine results from both telephone and online surveys, or for which respondents are initially recruited by telephone and then asked to complete an online survey. "Rolling" polls contain overlapping data from one poll to the next.)	Lead
Lethbridge College	October 10, 2019		17.9	64.0	9.7	-	4.1	1.9	2.4	±3.17 pp	953	telephone	46.1
Lethbridge College	February 5, 2019		12.9	71.4	9.3	-	1.9	2.1	2.3	±3.0 pp	1,055	telephone	58.5

== Results ==
=== Summary ===
The Conservative Party dominated the election, winning 33 out of 34 ridings and receiving 69% of the popular vote. The NDP held onto its seat of Edmonton Strathcona, and got 11.6% of the popular vote. The Liberal Party support collapsed, losing all their seats and falling to just 13.8% of the popular vote.

The Green party won no seats and 2.8% of the vote. The People's Party won no seats, and got 2.2%.

The Animal Protection Party of Canada, Canada's Fourth Front, the Christian Heritage Party, the Communist Party, the Libertarian Party, the Marxist–Leninist Party, the Rhino Party, and the Veterans Coalition Party, all ran at least one candidate in Alberta in this election and got a combined 0.4% of the vote.

Albertan summary seat results in the 2019 Canadian federal election
Party	Votes	Vote %	Vote +/-	Seats	Seat +/-
Conservative	1,438,233	69.0%	▲9.5pp	33 / 34 (97%)	▲5
New Democratic	241,376	11.6%	0pp	1 / 34 (3%)	0
Liberal	288,010	13.8%	▼10.8pp	0 / 34 (0%)	▼3
Green	59,271	2.8%	▲0.2pp	0 / 34 (0%)	0
People's	46,672	2.2%	▲2.2pp	0 / 34 (0%)	0
Independents and minor parties	9,399	0.5%	▼0.3pp	0 / 34 (0%)	0
Total	2,082,961	100%	–	34 / 34 (100%)	0

=== Comparison with national results ===
Results by party
Party	Popular vote %			Seats in caucus
Party	AB	Natl.	diff.	Seats in caucus
Conservative	69.0	34.3	+34.7	33 / 121 (27%)
New Democratic	11.6	16.0	-4.4	1 / 24 (4%)
Liberal	13.8	33.1	-19.3	0 / 157 (0%)
Green	2.8	6.5	-3.7	0 / 3 (0%)
People's	2.2	1.6	+0.6	no caucus
Total	–	–	–	34 / 338 (10%)

== Student Vote results ==
Student votes are mock elections, running parallel to actual elections, in which students not of voting age participate. Student vote elections are administered by Student Vote Canada, and are for educational purposes and do not count towards the results.

Summary of the 2019 Canadian Student Vote in Alberta
Party	Leader	Seats			Popular vote		
Party	Leader	Elected	%	Δ	Votes	%	Δ (pp)
Conservative	Andrew Scheer	30	88.24	▲8	97,269	46.13	▲6.41
New Democratic	Jagmeet Singh	3	8.82	▲2	44,729	21.21	▲5.99
Liberal	Justin Trudeau	1	2.94	▼11	28,085	13.32	▼16.13
Green	Elizabeth May	0	0	–	22,787	10.81	▼1.73
People's	Maxime Bernier	0	0	–	10,103	4.79	▲4.79
Other		0	0	–	7,906	3.75	▲0.85
Total		34	100.00	–	210,879	100.00	–
Source: Student Vote Canada

== See also ==
- Canadian federal election results in Calgary
- Canadian federal election results in Edmonton and environs
- Canadian federal election results in rural Alberta
- 2026 Alberta independence referendum
- 2019 Alberta general election
