= Advertising Standards Canada =

Consumer organization in Canada

Ad Standards
- Type: Non-profit
- Founded: 1957, over 50 years ago
- Key people: Catherine Bate (President & CEO)
- Website: adstandards.ca

Ad Standards (formerly Advertising Standards Canada) is the advertising industry's non-profit self-regulating body created in 1957 to ensure the integrity and viability of advertising in Canada. The organization's members include major advertisers, advertising agencies, media organizations, and suppliers to the advertising sector. Some of the activities that the organization engages in are:

- Administering the Canadian Code of Advertising Standards, which sets the criteria for acceptable advertising and forms the basis for the review and adjudication of consumer and trade complaints.
- Administering a consumer complaints process about advertisements currently running in Canadian media.
- Providing pre-clearance for advertising in six categories: children's, food and non-alcoholic beverages, restriction of advertising of food and beverage products to children, alcoholic beverages, consumer drugs, and cosmetics.

== History ==
The Canadian advertising industry founded the Canadian Advertising Advisory Board (later renamed Ad Standards) in 1957 as a means to encourage ethical advertising practices. The Canadian Code of Advertising Standards (Code) was published in 1963. The CAAB would adopt a bilingual name in 1967: the Canadian Advertising Advisory Board/Bureau consultatif de la publicité au Canada. That same year, as a means to adjudicate consumers' complaints, the Advertising Standards Council/le Conseil des normes de la publicté (ASC/CNP) was created. The reviewing of broadcast advertising to children by the CAAB began in 1972, and was initiated at the request of CAB and CRTC. Two years later, the British Columbia and Alberta Advertising Standards Councils were formed. 1976 saw the launch of the Trade Dispute Procedure. The Canadian Advertising Foundation/La foundation canadienne de la publicité (CAF/FCP) was created in 1982 as a result of the merger of the CAAB with ASC/CNP. In 1994, The Color of Your Money was produced by CAF's Race Relations Advisory Council on Advertising. The initial Ad Complaints Report, including case reports, was published in 1997; that same year, the CAF would be renamed to Advertising Standards Canada/Les normes canadiennes de la publicité. 1999 saw the launch of the "You respond to advertising – we respond to you" public awareness campaign. A second public awareness campaign - "We stand up for advertising standards" - would commence in 2001. In 2003, following a careful Task Force review of the Code, major Code revisions were published. Two years later, in 2005, comparative advertising and comparative research guidelines were published. Multiple public awareness campaigns continued to be launched throughout the rest of the decade and into the 2010s: "Truth" (2006), "Dressing it up doesn't make it true" (2011), and "Creativity is subjective. The truth isn't" (2015). On August 1, 2017, the organization announced the launch of a refreshed corporate identity, including a new name: Ad Standards/Normes de la publicité.

== Organization ==
=== Members ===
Ad Standards is funded through fees paid by its organizational members, including advertisers, media agencies, associations, advertising/marketing agencies and professional and research services organizations. They are also supported by other organizations in the advertising industry. For a current and complete list of members, visit the Ad Standards member page of the website: https://adstandards.ca/member-logos/.
