= Results breakdown of the 2019 Canadian federal election =

Results of the 43rd Canadian federal election

2019 Canadian federal election
- 21 October 2019
Party	Leader	Vote %	Seats	+/–
Liberal	Justin Trudeau	33.1%	157	−20
Conservative	Andrew Scheer	34.3%	121	+26
Bloc Québécois	Yves-François Blanchet	7.6%	32	+22
New Democratic	Jagmeet Singh	16.0%	24	−15
Green	Elizabeth May	6.6%	3	+1
People's	Maxime Bernier	1.6%	0	−1
This lists parties that won seats. See the complete results below.
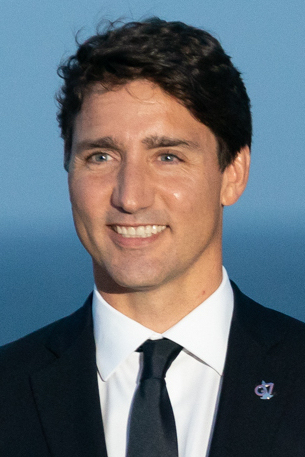

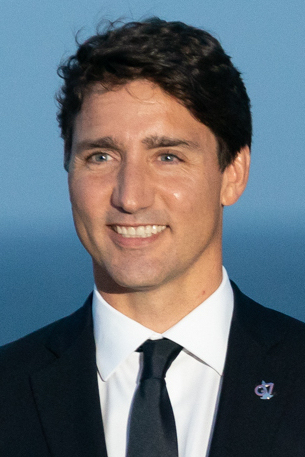
Prime Minister before	Prime Minister after
Justin Trudeau; Liberal	Justin Trudeau; Liberal

The 2019 Canadian federal election was held on October 21, 2019, to elect members of the House of Commons to the 43rd Canadian Parliament. The Liberal Party of Canada, having previously held a majority of the seats in the House, was returned with a minority of the seats, while the Conservative Party of Canada gained fewer seats than expected and the Bloc Québécois saw its standing revived in Quebec.

In this election there were 18,170,880 valid votes cast with 179,479 votes rejected, for total voter turnout of 67 percent of the 27,373,028 registered voters.

== Summary ==
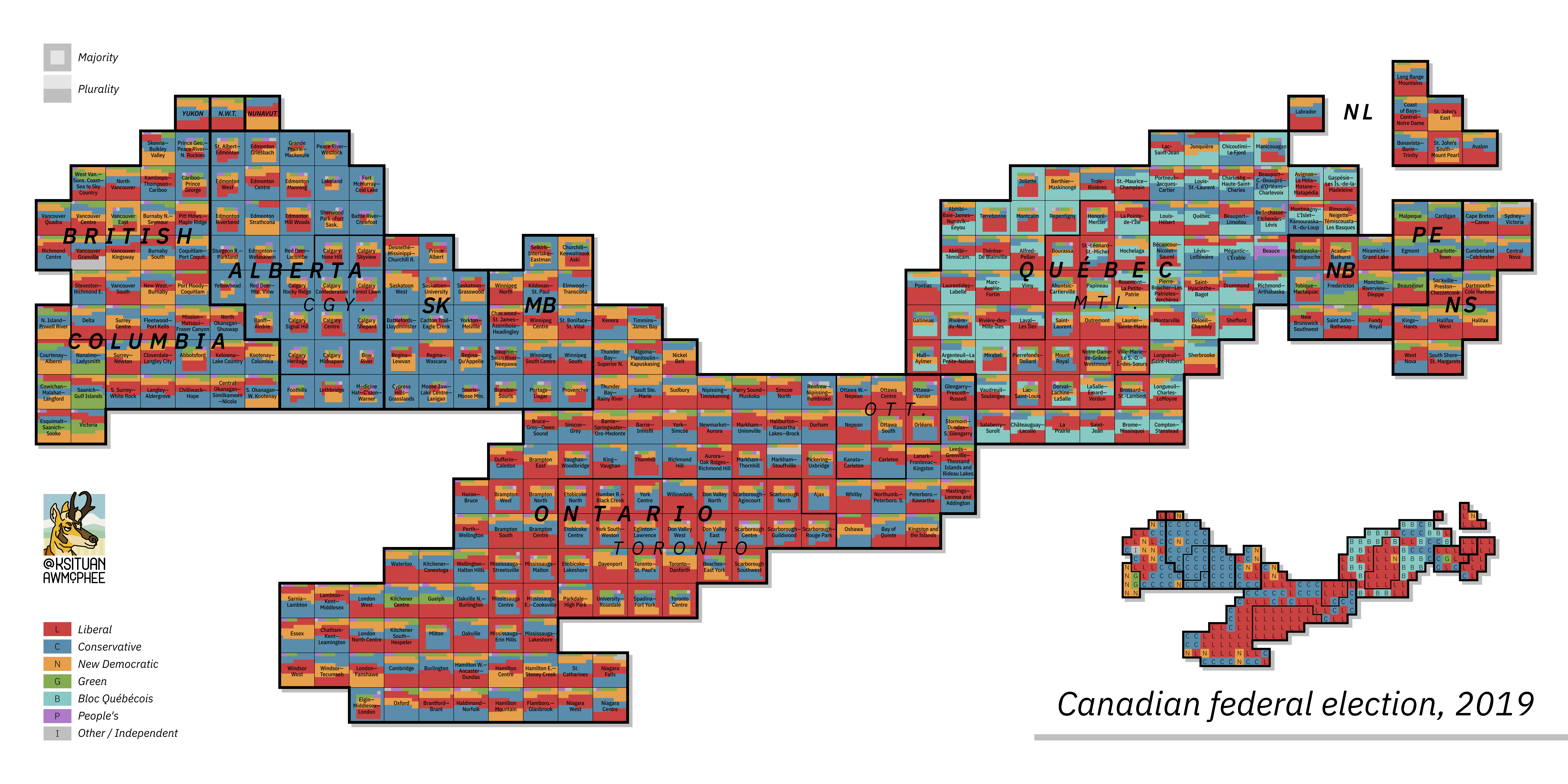
Grid cartogram of the 2019 Canadian general election, showing percentage of the popular vote by constituency. Majority victories are depicted as spirals, plurality victories as stacks. Cartogram at bottom right shows first-place results only.

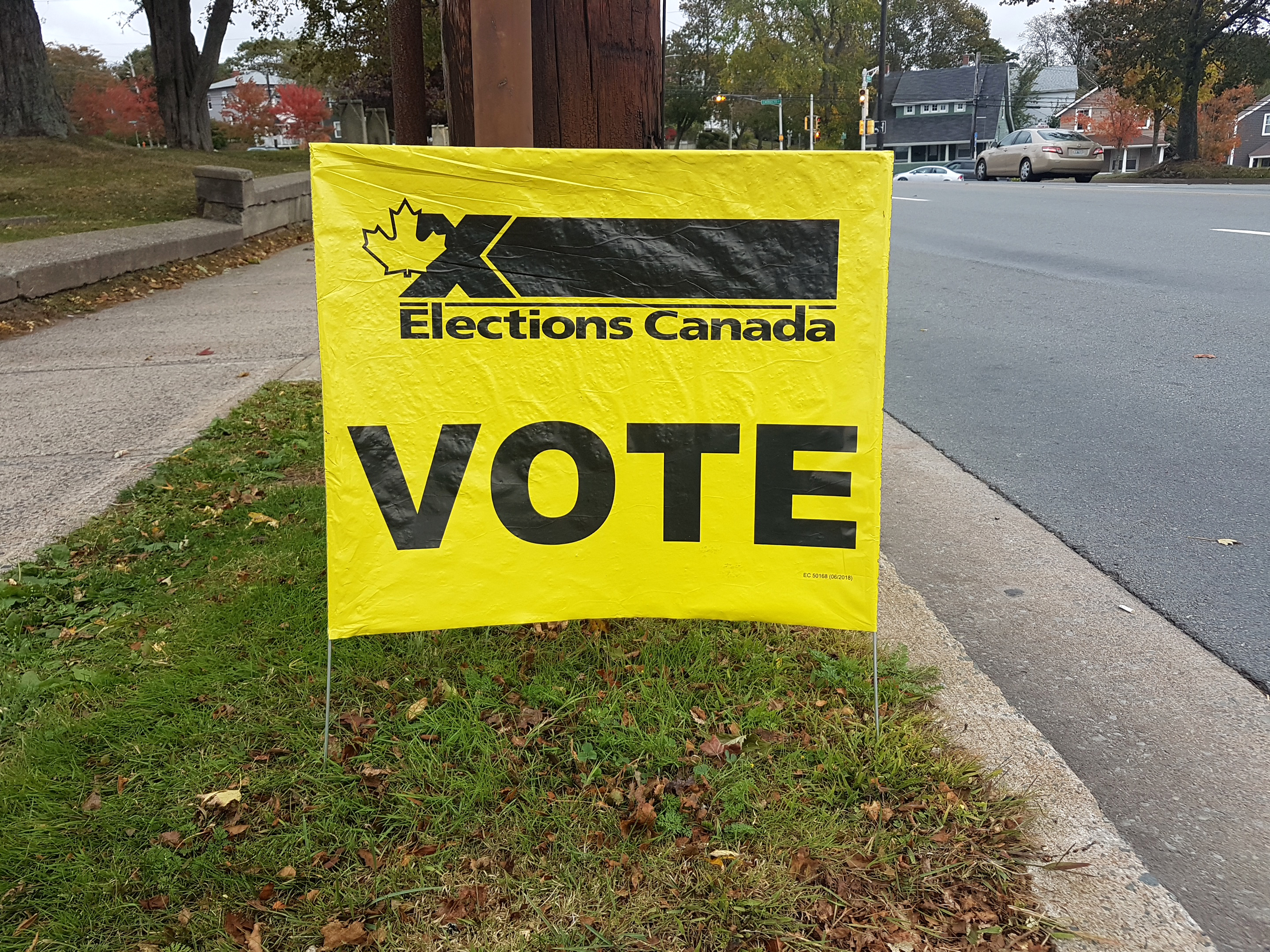
Elections Canada sign posted in front of polling place

Campaign strategy was weak in most of the political parties. As one commentator remarked, "Never before have both major parties taken such a small share of the vote. Never before, in my memory, have both declined steadily and together throughout a campaign." While the Conservative share of the vote rose from 31.9 percent in 2015 to 34.4 percent in 2019, and saw its share of the popular vote rise in 194 of the ridings, its share of the vote fell In the remaining 144. (Note: 139 in Ontario and Quebec, and 5 in the Lower Mainland of BC.) The Liberals emerged from the election with a strategic advantage in seats in both Ontario and Quebec, and the Conservatives' weakness on election day may lead to questions about the future of its leader Andrew Scheer, but there is also discussion as to whether the Tories' shortfall is due to more systemic reasons, especially with respect to the urban/rural divide in the electorate.

Opinion polling was generally accurate, although in most polls support for the Liberals and Conservatives was mildly understated, while that for the Bloc and the Greens was overstated. Seats won fell within poll projections, but it was noted that at least eight seats expected to go to the NDP actually went Liberal, leading to the conjecture that the prior departure of their long-time NDP MPs revealed the underlying weakness of the party brand.

=== Synopsis of results ===
Results by riding - 2019 Canadian federal election
Riding	Prov/ Terr	2015	Winning party					Turnout (Note: including spoilt ballots)	Votes (Note: minor political parties receiving less than 1% of the national popular vote are aggregated under "Other"; independent candidates are aggregated separately)								
Riding	Prov/ Terr	2015	Party	Votes	Share	Margin #	Margin %	Turnout	Lib	Con	NDP	BQ	Green	PPC	Ind	Other	Total
Banff—Airdrie	AB	Con	Con	55,504	71.1%	47,079	60.3%	73.1%	8,425	55,504	8,185	–	3,315	2,651	–	–	78,080
Battle River—Crowfoot	AB	Con	Con	53,309	85.5%	50,124	80.4%	77.3%	2,557	53,309	3,185	–	1,689	1,620	–	–	62,360
Bow River	AB	Con	Con	46,279	83.9%	43,106	78.2%	70.1%	3,173	46,279	3,086	–	826	1,321	–	453	55,138
Calgary Centre	AB	Lib	Con	37,306	56.6%	19,535	29.7%	69.4%	17,771	37,306	6,516	–	2,853	907	138	373	65,864
Calgary Confederation	AB	Con	Con	36,312	55.1%	21,404	32.5%	72.2%	14,908	36,312	7,312	–	5,700	1,136	–	524	65,892
Calgary Forest Lawn	AB	Con	Con	23,805	59.6%	15,115	37.8%	53.5%	8,690	23,805	4,227	–	1,318	1,089	388	447	39,964
Calgary Heritage	AB	Con	Con	40,817	70.7%	32,760	56.8%	70.9%	8,057	40,817	5,278	–	2,027	1,123	228	185	57,715
Calgary Midnapore	AB	Con	Con	50,559	74.3%	43,052	63.2%	73.2%	7,507	50,559	6,445	–	1,992	1,585	–	–	68,088
Calgary Nose Hill	AB	Con	Con	38,588	69.8%	29,885	54.0%	66.9%	8,703	38,588	5,304	–	1,554	1,089	–	71	55,309
Calgary Rocky Ridge	AB	Con	Con	48,253	68.3%	35,241	49.9%	72.3%	13,012	48,253	6,051	–	2,011	1,053	270	–	70,650
Calgary Shepard	AB	Con	Con	58,614	75.0%	49,970	63.9%	70.2%	8,644	58,614	6,828	–	2,345	1,709	–	–	78,140
Calgary Signal Hill	AB	Con	Con	44,421	70.0%	34,699	54.7%	72.1%	9,722	44,421	5,355	–	2,139	1,130	–	711	63,478
Calgary Skyview	AB	Lib	Con	26,533	52.5%	12,206	24.1%	60.7%	14,327	26,533	7,540	–	800	603	–	749	50,552
Edmonton Centre	AB	Lib	Con	22,006	41.4%	4,482	8.4%	65.4%	17,524	22,006	10,959	–	1,394	805	119	285	53,092
Edmonton Griesbach	AB	Con	Con	24,120	51.4%	12,320	26.2%	57.5%	8,100	24,120	11,800	–	1,189	1,074	216	464	46,963
Edmonton Manning	AB	Con	Con	30,425	55.9%	18,733	34.4%	61.5%	11,692	30,425	9,555	–	1,255	1,109	–	344	54,380
Edmonton Mill Woods	AB	Lib	Con	26,736	50.3%	8,857	16.7%	69.0%	17,879	26,736	6,422	–	968	953	–	219	53,177
Edmonton Riverbend	AB	Con	Con	35,126	57.4%	21,088	34.5%	71.0%	14,038	35,126	9,332	–	1,797	855	–	–	61,148
Edmonton Strathcona	AB	NDP	NDP	26,823	47.3%	5,788	10.2%	73.7%	6,592	21,035	26,823	–	1,152	941	–	202	56,745
Edmonton West	AB	Con	Con	35,719	60.9%	23,907	40.8%	66.6%	11,812	35,719	8,537	–	1,441	1,126	–	–	58,635
Edmonton—Wetaskiwin	AB	Con	Con	63,346	72.4%	52,544	60.1%	71.4%	10,802	63,346	9,820	–	1,660	1,616	–	211	87,455
Foothills	AB	Con	Con	53,872	82.1%	50,016	76.3%	76.6%	3,856	53,872	3,767	–	2,398	1,698	–	–	65,591
Fort McMurray—Cold Lake	AB	Con	Con	40,706	79.9%	35,858	70.3%	65.6%	4,848	40,706	2,883	–	865	1,674	–	–	50,976
Grande Prairie-Mackenzie	AB	Con	Con	51,198	84.0%	46,953	77.0%	72.4%	2,910	51,198	4,245	–	1,134	1,492	–	–	60,979
Lakeland	AB	Con	Con	48,314	83.9%	44,586	77.4%	73.6%	2,565	48,314	3,728	–	1,105	1,468	–	398	57,578
Lethbridge	AB	Con	Con	40,713	65.8%	31,603	51.1%	70.5%	8,443	40,713	9,110	–	1,939	1,007	–	670	61,882
Medicine Hat—Cardston—Warner	AB	Con	Con	42,045	79.2%	37,406	70.4%	68.1%	3,528	42,045	4,639	–	1,203	1,350	337	–	53,102
Peace River—Westlock	AB	Con	Con	41,659	80.7%	37,773	73.1%	70.4%	3,148	41,659	3,886	–	1,377	1,579	–	–	51,649
Red Deer—Lacombe	AB	Con	Con	53,843	79.8%	47,831	70.9%	72.8%	3,540	53,843	6,012	–	1,596	2,453	–	–	67,444
Red Deer—Mountain View	AB	Con	Con	54,765	80.3%	49,819	73.1%	76.8%	3,795	54,765	4,946	–	2,026	2,637	–	–	68,169
Sherwood Park—Fort Saskatchewan	AB	Con	Con	53,600	73.4%	44,733	61.2%	77.0%	7,357	53,600	8,867	–	1,592	1,334	–	300	73,050
St. Albert—Edmonton	AB	Con	Con	39,506	60.7%	27,029	41.5%	70.7%	12,477	39,506	9,895	–	1,594	1,268	–	351	65,091
Sturgeon River—Parkland	AB	Con	Con	53,235	77.5%	46,295	67.4%	74.2%	4,696	53,235	6,940	–	1,745	1,625	–	416	68,657
Yellowhead	AB	Con	Con	45,964	82.1%	42,066	75.2%	76.2%	2,912	45,964	3,898	–	1,272	1,592	–	330	55,968
Abbotsford	BC	Con	Con	25,162	51.4%	14,602	29.8%	65.9%	10,560	25,162	8,257	–	3,702	985	–	270	48,936
Burnaby North—Seymour	BC	Lib	Lib	17,770	35.5%	1,585	3.2%	65.4%	17,770	9,734	16,185	–	4,801	1,079	271	219	50,059
Burnaby South	BC	NDP	NDP	16,956	37.7%	3,042	6.8%	56.9%	10,706	13,914	16,956	–	2,477	645	–	308	45,006
Cariboo—Prince George	BC	Con	Con	28,848	52.7%	17,916	32.7%	65.5%	10,932	28,848	8,440	–	4,998	1,206	350	–	54,774
Central Okanagan—Similkameen—Nicola	BC	Con	Con	31,135	47.9%	14,883	22.9%	69.2%	16,252	31,135	10,904	–	5,086	1,345	–	213	64,935
Chilliwack—Hope	BC	Con	Con	26,672	49.6%	15,824	29.4%	65.7%	10,848	26,672	8,957	–	5,243	1,760	–	275	53,755
Cloverdale—Langley City	BC	Lib	Con	20,936	37.7%	1,394	2.5%	65.0%	19,542	20,936	10,508	–	3,572	930	–	–	55,488
Coquitlam—Port Coquitlam	BC	Lib	Lib	20,178	34.7%	390	0.7%	63.7%	20,178	19,788	13,383	–	4,025	703	–	98	58,175
Courtenay—Alberni	BC	NDP	NDP	29,790	41.2%	5,854	8.1%	72.3%	8,620	23,936	29,790	–	9,762	–	–	172	72,280
Cowichan—Malahat—Langford	BC	NDP	NDP	23,519	36.1%	6,560	10.1%	70.7%	10,301	16,959	23,519	–	13,181	1,066	–	202	65,228
Delta	BC	Lib	Lib	22,257	41.2%	4,448	8.2%	70.7%	22,257	17,809	8,792	–	3,387	948	783	–	53,976
Esquimalt—Saanich—Sooke	BC	NDP	NDP	23,887	34.1%	5,381	7.7%	70.9%	12,554	13,409	23,887	–	18,506	1,089	282	398	70,125
Fleetwood—Port Kells	BC	Lib	Lib	18,545	37.7%	1,899	3.9%	61.5%	18,401	16,518	10,533	–	2,360	1,093	–	–	48,905
Kamloops—Thompson—Cariboo	BC	Con	Con	32,415	44.7%	12,699	17.5%	70.8%	19,716	32,415	9,936	–	8,789	1,132	–	465	72,453
Kelowna—Lake Country	BC	Lib	Con	31,497	45.6%	8,870	12.8%	69.4%	22,627	31,497	8,381	–	5,171	1,225	219	–	69,120
Kootenay—Columbia	BC	NDP	Con	30,168	44.8%	7,019	10.4%	73.8%	6,151	30,168	23,149	–	6,145	1,378	–	339	67,330
Langley—Aldergrove	BC	Con	Con	29,823	47.0%	13,569	21.4%	68.9%	16,254	29,823	10,690	–	4,881	1,305	–	499	63,452
Mission—Matsqui—Fraser Canyon	BC	Lib	Con	19,535	42.4%	7,236	15.7%	67.2%	12,299	19,535	8,089	–	5,019	1,055	–	69	46,066
Nanaimo—Ladysmith	BC	NDP	Grn	24,844	34.6%	6,210	8.6%	69.5%	9,735	18,634	16,985	–	24,844	1,049	306	311	71,864
New Westminster—Burnaby	BC	NDP	NDP	23,437	44.2%	11,023	20.8%	62.3%	12,414	11,439	23,437	–	4,378	862	83	364	52,977
North Island—Powell River	BC	NDP	NDP	23,834	37.9%	3,332	5.3%	70.6%	8,251	20,502	23,834	–	8,891	1,102	287	48	62,915
North Okanagan—Shuswap	BC	Con	Con	36,154	48.8%	19,371	26.1%	70.0%	16,783	36,154	11,353	–	7,828	2,027	–	–	74,145
North Vancouver	BC	Lib	Lib	26,979	42.9%	10,071	16.0%	71.7%	26,979	16,908	10,340	–	7,868	835	–	–	62,930
Pitt Meadows—Maple Ridge	BC	Lib	Con	19,650	36.2%	3,525	6.5%	68.2%	16,125	19,650	12,958	–	4,332	698	468	–	54,231
Port Moody—Coquitlam	BC	NDP	Con	16,855	31.2%	153	0.3%	66.4%	15,695	16,855	16,702	–	3,873	821	–	57	54,003
Prince George—Peace River—Northern Rockies	BC	Con	Con	38,473	69.8%	32,082	58.2%	69.8%	6,391	38,473	5,069	–	3,448	1,748	–	–	55,129
Richmond Centre	BC	Con	Con	19,037	49.0%	7,985	20.6%	53.4%	11,052	19,037	5,617	–	2,376	538	197	–	38,817
Saanich—Gulf Islands	BC	Grn	Grn	33,454	49.1%	19,670	28.9%	75.5%	11,326	13,784	8,657	–	33,454	929	–	–	68,150
Skeena—Bulkley Valley	BC	NDP	NDP	16,944	40.9%	3,188	7.7%	62.7%	4,793	13,756	16,944	–	3,280	940	321	1,350	41,384
South Okanagan—West Kootenay	BC	NDP	NDP	24,809	36.4%	796	1.2%	69.6%	11,705	24,013	24,809	–	5,672	1,638	359	–	68,196
South Surrey—White Rock	BC	Con	Con	24,310	41.9%	2,618	4.5%	69.6%	21,692	24,310	6,716	–	4,458	852	–	–	58,028
Steveston—Richmond East	BC	Lib	Con	17,478	41.7%	2,747	6.5%	57.4%	14,731	17,478	6,321	–	2,972	–	449	–	41,951
Surrey Centre	BC	Lib	Lib	15,453	37.4%	4,100	9.9%	54.9%	15,453	10,505	11,353	–	2,558	709	243	498	41,319
Surrey—Newton	BC	Lib	Lib	18,960	45.0%	6,654	15.8%	63.4%	18,960	8,824	12,306	–	1,355	653	–	–	42,098
Vancouver Centre	BC	Lib	Lib	23,599	42.2%	10,319	18.4%	61.5%	23,599	10,782	13,280	–	7,002	724	180	379	55,946
Vancouver East	BC	NDP	NDP	29,236	52.6%	19,151	34.4%	61.1%	10,085	6,724	29,236	–	8,062	679	–	825	55,611
Vancouver Granville	BC	Lib	Ind	17,265	32.6%	3,177	6.0%	65.0%	14,088	11,605	6,960	–	2,683	431	17,265	–	53,032
Vancouver Kingsway	BC	NDP	NDP	21,680	49.1%	11,486	26.0%	59.4%	10,194	8,804	21,680	–	2,675	427	–	91	44,163
Vancouver Quadra	BC	Lib	Lib	22,093	43.5%	8,011	15.8%	68.0%	22,093	14,082	7,681	–	6,308	428	162	–	50,754
Vancouver South	BC	Lib	Lib	17,808	41.2%	3,420	7.9%	58.9%	17,808	14,388	8,015	–	2,451	532	–	–	43,194
Victoria	BC	NDP	NDP	23,765	33.2%	2,382	3.3%	73.5%	15,952	9,038	23,765	–	21,383	920	111	380	71,549
West Vancouver—Sunshine Coast—Sea to Sky Country	BC	Lib	Lib	22,673	34.9%	5,314	8.2%	69.1%	22,673	17,359	9,027	–	14,579	1,010	159	173	64,980
Brandon—Souris	MB	Con	Con	26,148	63.5%	20,343	49.4%	66.4%	4,972	26,148	5,805	–	2,984	691	326	280	41,206
Charleswood—St. James—Assiniboia—Headingley	MB	Lib	Con	18,815	40.7%	2,417	5.2%	71.1%	16,398	18,815	6,556	–	2,178	1,975	140	166	46,228
Churchill—Keewatinook Aski	MB	NDP	NDP	11,919	50.3%	6,303	26.6%	48.8%	5,616	4,714	11,919	–	1,144	294	–	–	23,687
Dauphin—Swan River—Neepawa	MB	Con	Con	26,103	64.3%	20,379	50.2%	66.2%	5,344	26,103	5,724	–	2,214	711	–	470	40,566
Elmwood—Transcona	MB	NDP	NDP	19,786	45.6%	3,546	8.2%	62.8%	5,346	16,240	19,786	–	1,480	512	–	–	43,364
Kildonan—St. Paul	MB	Lib	Con	19,856	44.8%	7,500	16.9%	67.7%	12,356	19,856	9,387	–	1,777	510	108	304	44,298
Portage—Lisgar	MB	Con	Con	31,600	70.8%	26,821	60.1%	68.5%	4,779	31,600	3,872	–	2,356	1,169	–	860	44,636
Provencher	MB	Con	Con	31,821	65.9%	25,474	52.7%	70.5%	6,347	31,821	6,187	–	2,884	1,066	–	–	48,305
Saint Boniface—Saint Vital	MB	Lib	Lib	20,300	42.9%	4,864	10.3%	69.9%	20,300	15,436	8,037	–	2,671	591	303	–	47,338
Selkirk—Interlake—Eastman	MB	Con	Con	31,109	62.7%	22,236	44.8%	68.7%	6,003	31,109	8,873	–	2,934	683	–	–	49,602
Winnipeg Centre	MB	Lib	NDP	13,073	41.2%	2,369	7.5%	54.2%	10,704	5,561	13,073	–	1,661	474	–	251	31,724
Winnipeg North	MB	Lib	Lib	15,581	47.6%	7,112	21.7%	52.4%	15,581	6,820	8,469	–	905	324	231	404	32,735
Winnipeg South	MB	Lib	Lib	20,182	42.1%	1,645	3.4%	69.9%	20,182	18,537	6,678	–	2,073	419	–	–	47,889
Winnipeg South Centre	MB	Lib	Lib	22,799	45.0%	7,748	15.3%	71.6%	22,799	15,051	8,965	–	3,173	569	–	104	50,661
Acadie—Bathurst	NB	Lib	Lib	26,547	55.1%	16,195	33.6%	73.5%	26,547	10,352	6,967	–	4,277	–	–	–	48,143
Beauséjour	NB	Lib	Lib	24,948	46.5%	10,643	19.8%	78.0%	24,948	9,438	3,940	–	14,305	1,054	–	–	53,685
Fredericton	NB	Lib	Grn	16,640	33.7%	1,629	3.3%	75.5%	13,544	15,011	2,946	–	16,640	776	–	492	49,409
Fundy Royal	NB	Lib	Con	22,389	46.0%	9,956	20.5%	75.4%	12,433	22,389	4,804	–	7,275	1,249	295	201	48,646
Madawaska—Restigouche	NB	Lib	Lib	17,331	50.3%	7,530	21.8%	69.4%	17,331	9,801	2,212	–	5,125	–	–	–	34,469
Miramichi—Grand Lake	NB	Lib	Lib	12,722	36.8%	370	1.1%	72.8%	12,722	12,352	2,875	–	3,914	1,179	1,556	–	34,598
Moncton—Riverview—Dieppe	NB	Lib	Lib	22,261	43.0%	10,061	19.4%	70.0%	22,261	12,200	6,164	–	9,287	1,258	–	658	51,828
New Brunswick Southwest	NB	Lib	Con	19,451	49.1%	9,341	23.6%	74.5%	10,110	19,451	3,251	–	5,352	1,214	–	200	39,578
Saint John—Rothesay	NB	Lib	Lib	15,443	37.4%	1,437	3.5%	65.5%	15,443	14,006	5,046	–	4,165	1,260	1,333	–	41,253
Tobique—Mactaquac	NB	Lib	Con	19,229	50.3%	9,598	25.1%	70.0%	9,631	19,229	3,007	–	5,398	936	–	–	38,201
Avalon	NL	Lib	Lib	19,122	46.3%	6,267	15.2%	60.4%	19,122	12,855	7,142	–	2,215	–	–	–	41,334
Bonavista—Burin—Trinity	NL	Lib	Lib	14,707	45.7%	2,010	6.2%	55.8%	14,707	12,697	3,855	–	920	–	–	–	32,179
Coast of Bays—Central—Notre Dame	NL	Lib	Lib	16,514	48.3%	4,433	13.0%	55.6%	16,514	12,081	4,224	–	1,363	–	–	–	34,182
Labrador	NL	Lib	Lib	4,851	42.5%	1,303	11.4%	57.7%	4,851	3,548	2,796	–	224	–	–	–	11,419
Long Range Mountains	NL	Lib	Lib	18,199	47.4%	7,326	19.1%	56.2%	18,199	10,873	7,609	–	1,334	–	–	411	38,426
St. John's East	NL	Lib	NDP	21,148	46.9%	6,186	13.7%	69.0%	14,962	8,141	21,148	–	821	–	–	–	45,072
St. John's South—Mount Pearl	NL	Lib	Lib	20,793	51.1%	9,903	24.4%	61.4%	20,793	7,767	10,890	–	740	335	–	141	40,666
Cape Breton—Canso	NS	Lib	Lib	16,694	38.9%	1,873	4.4%	72.1%	16,694	14,821	6,354	–	3,321	925	685	140	42,940
Central Nova	NS	Lib	Lib	20,718	46.6%	7,517	16.9%	74.5%	20,718	13,201	5,806	–	3,478	938	149	180	44,470
Cumberland—Colchester	NS	Lib	Lib	16,672	36.7%	453	1.0%	68.9%	16,672	16,219	5,451	–	6,015	608	232	253	45,450
Dartmouth—Cole Harbour	NS	Lib	Lib	24,259	45.3%	9,824	18.4%	70.0%	24,259	8,638	14,435	–	5,280	887	–	–	53,499
Halifax	NS	Lib	Lib	23,681	42.5%	6,934	12.4%	75.0%	23,681	6,456	16,747	–	8,013	633	–	222	55,752
Halifax West	NS	Lib	Lib	26,885	49.5%	16,397	30.2%	71.1%	26,885	10,488	10,429	–	6,555	–	–	–	54,357
Kings—Hants	NS	Lib	Lib	20,806	43.3%	8,901	18.5%	69.5%	20,806	11,905	8,254	–	6,029	786	–	256	48,036
Sackville—Preston—Chezzetcook	NS	Lib	Lib	19,925	40.2%	8,065	16.3%	69.8%	19,925	11,211	11,860	–	5,725	816	–	–	49,537
South Shore—St. Margarets	NS	Lib	Lib	21,886	41.7%	7,142	13.6%	67.7%	21,886	14,744	8,361	–	6,070	667	541	249	52,518
Sydney—Victoria	NS	Lib	Lib	12,536	30.9%	1,309	3.2%	68.4%	12,536	11,227	8,146	–	2,249	–	6,159	248	40,565
West Nova	NS	Lib	Con	18,390	39.3%	1,365	2.9%	67.7%	17,025	18,390	5,010	–	5,939	–	–	434	46,798
Ajax	ON	Lib	Lib	35,198	57.7%	19,334	31.7%	66.3%	35,198	15,864	7,033	–	2,040	588	297	–	61,020
Algoma—Manitoulin—Kapuskasing	ON	NDP	NDP	16,883	41.6%	6,258	15.4%	62.6%	9,879	10,625	16,883	–	2,192	887	–	125	40,591
Aurora—Oak Ridges—Richmond Hill	ON	Lib	Con	23,568	44.4%	1,060	2.0%	64.4%	22,508	23,568	3,820	–	2,154	530	–	529	53,109
Barrie—Innisfil	ON	Con	Con	23,765	43.8%	7,886	14.5%	63.0%	15,879	23,765	8,880	–	4,716	1,013	–	–	54,253
Barrie—Springwater—Oro-Medonte	ON	Con	Con	20,981	39.0%	4,176	7.8%	66.9%	16,805	20,981	7,972	–	7,066	969	–	–	53,793
Bay of Quinte	ON	Lib	Lib	24,099	39.2%	1,449	2.4%	66.1%	24,099	22,650	9,851	–	3,740	1,207	–	–	61,547
Beaches—East York	ON	Lib	Lib	32,647	57.2%	20,451	35.8%	70.9%	32,647	8,026	12,196	–	3,378	831	–	–	57,078
Brampton Centre	ON	Lib	Lib	18,771	47.2%	8,075	20.3%	59.8%	18,771	10,696	7,819	–	1,685	681	–	106	39,758
Brampton East	ON	Lib	Lib	24,050	47.4%	10,682	21.0%	66.4%	24,050	12,125	13,368	–	666	244	211	89	50,753
Brampton North	ON	Lib	Lib	25,970	51.4%	11,997	23.8%	65.9%	25,970	13,973	8,533	–	1,516	510	–	–	50,502
Brampton South	ON	Lib	Lib	24,085	49.5%	10,257	21.1%	62.8%	24,085	13,828	7,985	–	1,926	354	–	505	48,683
Brampton West	ON	Lib	Lib	28,743	53.5%	15,919	29.7%	62.6%	28,743	12,824	9,855	–	1,271	505	–	485	53,683
Brantford—Brant	ON	Con	Con	26,849	40.3%	6,395	9.6%	62.2%	20,454	26,849	13,131	–	4,257	1,320	261	394	66,666
Bruce—Grey—Owen Sound	ON	Con	Con	26,830	46.1%	9,345	16.1%	65.6%	17,485	26,830	6,797	–	5,114	1,614	–	321	58,161
Burlington	ON	Lib	Lib	34,989	48.4%	11,059	15.4%	72.6%	34,989	23,930	7,372	–	4,750	944	–	–	71,985
Cambridge	ON	Lib	Lib	22,903	39.5%	5,494	9.5%	64.9%	22,903	17,409	11,177	–	4,343	1,872	–	238	57,942
Carleton	ON	Con	Con	32,147	46.3%	5,629	8.1%	79.5%	26,518	32,147	6,479	–	3,423	792	–	–	69,359
Chatham-Kent—Leamington	ON	Con	Con	25,359	46.9%	8,460	15.6%	63.3%	16,899	25,359	8,229	–	2,233	1,061	–	307	54,088
Davenport	ON	Lib	Lib	23,251	43.7%	1,439	2.7%	67.1%	23,251	4,921	21,812	–	2,397	496	165	138	53,180
Don Valley East	ON	Lib	Lib	25,295	59.8%	15,180	35.9%	49.8%	25,295	10,115	4,647	–	1,675	562	–	–	42,294
Don Valley North	ON	Lib	Lib	23,495	50.4%	6,989	15.0%	62.0%	23,495	16,506	4,285	–	1,803	482	–	–	46,571
Don Valley West	ON	Lib	Lib	29,148	55.8%	12,844	24.6%	71.5%	29,148	16,304	3,804	–	2,257	444	–	277	52,234
Dufferin—Caledon	ON	Con	Con	28,852	42.0%	6,207	9.0%	65.1%	22,645	28,852	7,981	–	7,303	1,516	–	319	68,616
Durham	ON	Con	Con	30,752	42.1%	7,205	9.9%	68.5%	23,547	30,752	13,323	–	3,950	1,442	–	–	73,014
Eglinton—Lawrence	ON	Lib	Lib	29,850	53.3%	11,301	20.2%	68.1%	29,850	18,549	4,741	–	2,278	586	–	–	56,004
Elgin—Middlesex—London	ON	Con	Con	31,026	50.2%	16,702	27.0%	66.7%	14,324	31,026	11,019	–	3,562	956	–	867	61,754
Essex	ON	NDP	Con	28,274	41.4%	4,671	6.8%	67.3%	12,987	28,274	23,603	–	2,173	1,251	–	–	68,288
Etobicoke Centre	ON	Lib	Lib	32,800	51.9%	10,996	17.4%	69.5%	32,800	21,804	4,881	–	2,775	664	–	295	63,219
Etobicoke North	ON	Lib	Lib	26,388	61.4%	16,864	39.3%	58.8%	26,388	9,524	4,654	–	1,080	1,196	–	104	42,946
Etobicoke—Lakeshore	ON	Lib	Lib	36,061	51.9%	16,109	23.2%	68.0%	36,061	19,952	8,277	–	4,141	921	–	163	69,515
Flamborough—Glanbrook	ON	Con	Con	24,527	39.2%	1,652	2.6%	70.5%	22,875	24,527	10,322	–	3,833	982	–	–	62,539
Glengarry—Prescott—Russell	ON	Lib	Lib	31,293	47.4%	7,633	11.6%	72.2%	31,293	23,660	6,851	–	2,113	1,174	239	461	65,791
Guelph	ON	Lib	Lib	30,497	40.4%	11,261	14.9%	72.3%	30,497	14,568	9,297	–	19,236	1,087	219	664	75,568
Haldimand—Norfolk	ON	Con	Con	28,018	46.8%	13,314	22.2%	66.3%	14,704	28,018	9,192	–	4,878	1,234	–	1,900	59,926
Haliburton—Kawartha Lakes—Brock	ON	Con	Con	32,257	49.1%	15,190	23.1%	66.9%	17,067	32,257	9,676	–	5,515	1,245	–	–	65,760
Hamilton Centre	ON	NDP	NDP	20,368	46.2%	7,717	17.5%	60.3%	12,651	6,341	20,368	–	3,370	833	377	182	44,122
Hamilton East—Stoney Creek	ON	Lib	Lib	20,112	38.6%	5,182	9.9%	62.2%	20,112	13,130	14,930	–	2,902	1,072	–	–	52,146
Hamilton Mountain	ON	NDP	NDP	19,135	36.1%	3,078	5.8%	66.0%	16,057	13,443	19,135	–	3,115	760	–	439	52,949
Hamilton West—Ancaster—Dundas	ON	Lib	Lib	30,214	46.6%	12,874	19.8%	74.6%	30,214	17,340	11,527	–	4,770	894	–	156	64,901
Hastings—Lennox and Addington	ON	Lib	Con	21,968	41.4%	2,247	4.2%	66.7%	19,721	21,968	6,984	–	3,114	1,307	–	–	53,094
Humber River—Black Creek	ON	Lib	Lib	23,187	61.1%	15,989	42.1%	56.8%	23,187	6,164	7,198	–	804	402	–	203	37,958
Huron—Bruce	ON	Con	Con	29,512	48.5%	9,345	15.4%	71.1%	20,167	29,512	7,421	–	2,665	1,102	–	–	60,867
Kanata—Carleton	ON	Lib	Lib	28,746	43.1%	4,385	6.6%	77.4%	28,746	24,361	8,317	–	4,387	961	–	–	66,772
Kenora	ON	Lib	Con	9,445	34.0%	1,110	4.0%	61.4%	8,335	9,445	7,923	–	1,526	388	170	–	27,787
Kingston and the Islands	ON	Lib	Lib	31,205	45.8%	15,349	22.5%	70.5%	31,205	13,304	15,856	–	6,059	1,769	–	–	68,193
King—Vaughan	ON	Lib	Lib	28,725	45.0%	1,141	1.8%	64.9%	28,725	27,584	4,297	–	2,511	731	–	–	63,848
Kitchener Centre	ON	Lib	Lib	20,316	36.7%	5,922	10.7%	67.1%	20,316	13,191	6,238	–	14,394	1,033	–	202	55,374
Kitchener South—Hespeler	ON	Lib	Lib	20,986	40.2%	3,506	6.7%	66.0%	20,986	17,480	6,945	–	5,671	1,005	–	146	52,233
Kitchener—Conestoga	ON	Con	Lib	20,480	39.7%	365	0.7%	69.6%	20,480	20,115	5,204	–	4,946	790	–	–	51,535
Lambton—Kent—Middlesex	ON	Con	Con	28,651	49.0%	13,837	23.7%	66.6%	14,814	28,651	9,355	–	3,463	1,804	–	325	58,412
Lanark—Frontenac—Kingston	ON	Con	Con	30,077	48.1%	14,636	23.4%	72.5%	15,441	30,077	8,835	–	7,011	1,117	–	–	62,481
Leeds—Grenville—Thousand Islands and Rideau Lakes	ON	Con	Con	28,630	49.0%	13,148	22.5%	69.8%	15,482	28,630	8,201	–	5,152	988	–	–	58,453
London North Centre	ON	Lib	Lib	27,247	42.7%	12,181	19.1%	67.3%	27,247	15,066	14,887	–	4,872	1,532	–	137	63,741
London West	ON	Lib	Lib	30,622	43.0%	10,712	15.0%	72.0%	30,622	19,910	15,220	–	3,827	1,171	–	523	71,273
London—Fanshawe	ON	NDP	NDP	22,671	40.8%	7,747	13.9%	60.4%	14,924	13,770	22,671	–	2,781	1,132	297	–	55,575
Markham—Stouffville	ON	Lib	Lib	25,055	38.9%	5,352	8.3%	68.4%	25,055	19,703	4,132	–	1,621	537	13,340	–	64,388
Markham—Thornhill	ON	Lib	Lib	24,124	53.9%	8,650	19.3%	62.8%	23,899	15,319	3,233	–	1,247	357	276	–	44,331
Markham—Unionville	ON	Con	Con	26,133	48.9%	5,649	10.6%	60.9%	20,484	26,133	3,524	–	2,394	861	–	–	53,396
Milton	ON	Con	Lib	30,882	51.7%	9,318	15.6%	70.8%	30,882	21,564	3,851	–	2,769	613	–	–	59,679
Mississauga Centre	ON	Lib	Lib	29,974	55.8%	14,100	26.2%	62.3%	29,974	15,874	5,173	–	1,646	837	252	–	53,756
Mississauga East—Cooksville	ON	Lib	Lib	27,923	53.1%	10,259	19.5%	62.1%	27,923	17,664	4,643	–	1,578	637	–	178	52,623
Mississauga—Erin Mills	ON	Lib	Lib	31,181	53.5%	12,131	20.8%	66.6%	31,181	19,050	5,236	–	2,147	648	–	–	58,262
Mississauga—Lakeshore	ON	Lib	Lib	29,526	48.4%	6,786	11.1%	68.2%	29,526	22,740	5,103	–	2,814	717	–	99	60,999
Mississauga—Malton	ON	Lib	Lib	27,890	57.5%	15,362	31.7%	62.0%	27,890	12,528	6,103	–	1,251	369	–	396	48,537
Mississauga—Streetsville	ON	Lib	Lib	29,618	50.4%	10,144	17.3%	67.6%	29,618	19,474	6,036	–	2,688	706	–	243	58,765
Nepean	ON	Lib	Lib	31,933	45.9%	8,613	12.4%	75.2%	31,933	23,320	9,104	–	4,379	687	–	160	69,583
Newmarket—Aurora	ON	Lib	Lib	26,488	43.1%	3,236	5.3%	67.3%	26,488	23,252	6,576	–	3,551	588	–	1,005	61,460
Niagara Centre	ON	Lib	Lib	20,292	35.0%	2,305	4.0%	64.9%	20,292	17,987	15,469	–	3,054	776	–	385	57,963
Niagara Falls	ON	Con	Con	24,751	35.5%	2,061	3.0%	62.3%	22,690	24,751	12,566	–	3,404	968	4,997	358	69,734
Niagara West	ON	Con	Con	24,447	45.3%	7,018	13.0%	72.5%	17,429	24,447	6,540	–	3,620	869	–	1,019	53,924
Nickel Belt	ON	Lib	Lib	19,046	39.0%	3,390	6.9%	64.7%	19,046	10,343	15,656	–	2,644	1,159	–	–	48,848
Nipissing—Timiskaming	ON	Lib	Lib	19,352	40.5%	6,368	13.3%	64.6%	19,352	12,984	9,784	–	3,111	2,496	–	–	47,727
Northumberland—Peterborough South	ON	Lib	Con	27,385	39.7%	2,408	3.5%	71.7%	24,977	27,385	9,615	–	5,524	1,460	–	–	68,961
Oakville	ON	Lib	Lib	30,265	46.3%	4,704	7.2%	73.1%	30,265	25,561	4,928	–	3,704	798	–	145	65,401
Oakville North—Burlington	ON	Lib	Lib	33,597	48.3%	7,113	10.2%	71.9%	33,597	26,484	5,866	–	2,925	751	–	–	69,623
Orléans	ON	Lib	Lib	44,183	54.3%	21,199	26.0%	77.3%	44,183	22,984	9,428	–	3,829	986	–	–	81,410
Oshawa	ON	Con	Con	24,087	38.9%	6,419	10.4%	61.5%	15,750	24,087	17,668	–	3,151	1,215	–	112	61,983
Ottawa Centre	ON	Lib	Lib	38,391	48.7%	15,575	19.7%	80.1%	38,391	9,920	22,916	–	5,837	720	242	876	78,902
Ottawa South	ON	Lib	Lib	34,205	52.3%	18,180	27.8%	72.0%	34,205	16,025	10,457	–	3,645	717	228	99	65,376
Ottawa West—Nepean	ON	Lib	Lib	28,378	45.6%	11,502	18.5%	72.6%	28,378	16,876	11,646	–	3,894	839	71	502	62,206
Ottawa—Vanier	ON	Lib	Lib	32,679	51.2%	19,163	30.0%	71.0%	32,679	11,118	13,516	–	4,796	1,064	305	403	63,881
Oxford	ON	Con	Con	29,310	48.1%	17,004	27.9%	66.2%	11,745	29,310	12,306	–	4,770	1,774	–	986	60,891
Parkdale—High Park	ON	Lib	Lib	28,852	47.4%	9,672	15.9%	74.0%	28,852	8,015	19,180	–	3,916	643	–	281	60,887
Parry Sound-Muskoka	ON	Con	Con	22,845	41.8%	6,230	11.4%	66.4%	16,615	22,845	6,417	–	8,409	–	377	–	54,663
Perth Wellington	ON	Con	Con	25,622	46.3%	10,620	19.2%	67.3%	15,002	25,622	8,094	–	4,949	894	–	733	55,294
Peterborough—Kawartha	ON	Lib	Lib	27,400	39.3%	3,043	4.4%	70.5%	27,400	24,357	11,872	–	4,930	890	180	172	69,801
Pickering—Uxbridge	ON	Lib	Lib	32,387	51.0%	13,925	21.9%	68.9%	32,387	18,462	7,582	–	3,799	1,265	–	–	63,495
Renfrew—Nipissing—Pembroke	ON	Con	Con	31,080	52.7%	19,548	33.2%	69.1%	11,532	31,080	8,786	–	3,230	1,463	2,242	624	58,957
Richmond Hill	ON	Lib	Lib	21,804	43.5%	212	0.4%	59.9%	21,804	21,592	4,425	–	1,695	507	–	126	50,149
Sarnia—Lambton	ON	Con	Con	28,623	49.4%	15,979	27.6%	68.7%	12,041	28,623	12,644	–	2,490	1,587	–	531	57,916
Sault Ste. Marie	ON	Lib	Lib	16,284	39.1%	2,877	6.9%	63.5%	16,284	13,407	9,459	–	1,809	741	–	–	41,700
Scarborough Centre	ON	Lib	Lib	25,695	55.2%	15,308	32.9%	62.4%	25,695	10,387	5,452	–	1,336	1,162	2,524	–	46,556
Scarborough North	ON	Lib	Lib	20,911	53.4%	9,073	23.2%	59.7%	20,911	11,838	5,039	–	796	370	–	83	39,037
Scarborough Southwest	ON	Lib	Lib	28,965	57.2%	18,463	36.5%	65.3%	28,965	10,502	7,865	–	2,477	590	–	236	50,635
Scarborough—Agincourt	ON	Lib	Lib	21,115	50.5%	5,623	13.4%	59.3%	21,115	15,492	3,636	–	1,050	521	–	–	41,814
Scarborough-Guildwood	ON	Lib	Lib	26,123	61.1%	16,570	38.8%	63.9%	26,123	9,553	4,806	–	1,220	648	252	140	42,742
Scarborough—Rouge Park	ON	Lib	Lib	31,360	62.2%	21,245	42.1%	66.4%	31,360	10,115	5,801	–	2,330	467	–	353	50,426
Simcoe North	ON	Con	Con	27,241	43.4%	7,931	12.6%	65.0%	19,310	27,241	8,850	–	5,882	1,154	–	341	62,778
Simcoe—Grey	ON	Con	Con	32,812	43.5%	8,887	11.8%	66.0%	23,925	32,812	8,462	–	8,589	1,416	–	305	75,509
Spadina—Fort York	ON	Lib	Lib	33,822	55.8%	21,634	35.7%	67.7%	33,822	10,680	12,188	–	3,174	672	114	–	60,650
St. Catharines	ON	Lib	Lib	24,183	40.2%	5,205	8.7%	67.0%	24,183	18,978	12,431	–	3,695	826	–	–	60,113
Stormont—Dundas—South Glengarry	ON	Con	Con	28,976	53.9%	15,209	28.3%	64.0%	13,767	28,976	7,674	–	2,126	1,168	–	–	53,711
Sudbury	ON	Lib	Lib	19,643	40.9%	5,758	12.0%	65.2%	19,643	9,864	13,885	–	3,225	873	205	282	47,977
Thornhill	ON	Con	Con	29,187	54.6%	10,241	19.1%	63.8%	18,946	29,187	3,469	–	1,600	–	–	294	53,496
Thunder Bay—Rainy River	ON	Lib	Lib	14,498	35.3%	2,459	6.0%	63.0%	14,498	12,039	11,944	–	1,829	741	–	–	41,051
Thunder Bay—Superior North	ON	Lib	Lib	18,502	42.9%	7,466	17.3%	66.1%	18,502	11,036	9,126	–	3,639	734	–	140	43,177
Timmins-James Bay	ON	NDP	NDP	14,885	40.5%	4,978	13.5%	58.6%	9,443	9,907	14,885	–	1,257	1,248	–	–	36,740
Toronto Centre	ON	Lib	Lib	31,271	57.4%	19,129	35.1%	68.5%	31,271	6,613	12,142	–	3,852	–	126	508	54,512
Toronto—Danforth	ON	Lib	Lib	27,681	47.7%	8,398	14.5%	71.9%	27,681	6,091	19,283	–	3,761	621	210	412	58,059
Toronto—St. Paul's	ON	Lib	Lib	32,494	54.3%	19,561	32.7%	71.6%	32,494	12,933	9,442	–	4,042	923	–	–	59,834
University—Rosedale	ON	Lib	Lib	29,652	51.7%	17,079	29.8%	71.6%	29,652	9,342	12,573	–	4,861	510	–	453	57,391
Vaughan—Woodbridge	ON	Lib	Lib	25,810	51.3%	7,521	14.9%	63.7%	25,810	18,289	3,910	–	1,302	852	165	–	50,328
Waterloo	ON	Lib	Lib	31,085	48.8%	15,470	24.3%	74.8%	31,085	15,615	9,710	–	6,184	1,112	–	–	63,706
Wellington—Halton Hills	ON	Con	Con	33,044	47.4%	13,267	19.0%	70.8%	19,777	33,044	6,499	–	8,851	1,509	–	–	69,680
Whitby	ON	Lib	Lib	30,182	43.7%	5,618	8.1%	70.8%	30,182	24,564	9,760	–	3,735	860	–	–	69,101
Willowdale	ON	Lib	Lib	22,282	49.0%	5,830	12.8%	58.2%	22,282	16,452	4,231	–	1,671	563	–	271	45,470
Windsor West	ON	NDP	NDP	20,800	40.0%	1,922	3.7%	56.0%	18,878	9,925	20,800	–	1,325	958	–	76	51,962
Windsor—Tecumseh	ON	NDP	Lib	19,046	33.4%	629	1.1%	60.5%	19,046	15,851	18,417	–	2,177	1,279	–	187	56,957
York Centre	ON	Lib	Lib	21,680	50.2%	5,828	13.5%	62.5%	21,680	15,852	4,251	–	1,403	–	–	–	43,186
York South—Weston	ON	Lib	Lib	25,976	58.4%	17,561	39.5%	57.8%	25,976	8,415	7,754	–	1,633	685	–	–	44,463
York—Simcoe	ON	Con	Con	24,918	46.3%	10,511	19.5%	60.7%	14,407	24,918	7,620	–	4,650	875	–	1,311	53,781
Cardigan	PE	Lib	Lib	10,939	49.3%	4,500	20.3%	75.5%	10,939	6,439	1,481	–	3,068	–	–	240	22,167
Charlottetown	PE	Lib	Lib	8,812	44.3%	4,164	20.9%	73.4%	8,812	4,040	2,238	–	4,648	–	–	172	19,910
Egmont	PE	Lib	Lib	8,016	39.7%	1,082	5.4%	72.0%	8,016	6,934	1,230	–	3,998		–	–	20,178
Malpeque	PE	Lib	Lib	9,533	41.4%	3,430	14.9%	77.1%	9,533	5,908	1,495	–	6,103	–	–	–	23,039
Abitibi—Baie-James—Nunavik—Eeyou	QC	NDP	BQ	11,432	36.1%	2,469	7.8%	50.2%	8,963	5,240	4,104	11,432	1,151	379	–	387	31,656
Abitibi—Témiscamingue	QC	NDP	BQ	22,803	45.5%	10,386	20.7%	62.2%	12,417	7,537	5,093	22,803	1,818	487	–	–	50,155
Ahuntsic-Cartierville	QC	Lib	Lib	28,904	52.4%	16,930	30.7%	67.5%	28,904	4,013	6,284	11,974	3,352	584	–	–	55,111
Alfred-Pellan	QC	Lib	Lib	26,015	47.9%	10,466	19.3%	69.9%	26,015	5,917	4,109	15,549	1,958	471	113	177	54,309
Argenteuil—La Petite-Nation	QC	Lib	Lib	18,896	37.8%	729	1.5%	63.4%	18,896	6,044	3,758	18,167	2,411	721	–	–	49,997
Avignon—La Mitis—Matane—Matapédia	QC	Lib	BQ	18,500	51.4%	6,312	17.5%	61.4%	12,188	2,756	1,435	18,500	699	210	–	180	35,968
Beauce	QC	Con	Con	22,860	38.5%	6,064	10.2%	70.2%	6,971	22,860	1,847	8,410	1,461	16,796	–	1,084	59,429
Beauport—Côte-de-Beaupré—Île d'Orléans—Charlevoix	QC	Con	BQ	18,407	36.4%	3,363	6.6%	67.5%	10,608	15,044	2,841	18,407	1,355	1,045	1,335	–	50,635
Beauport—Limoilou	QC	Con	BQ	15,149	30.2%	1,964	3.9%	66.1%	13,020	13,185	5,599	15,149	2,127	1,033	–	78	50,191
Bécancour—Nicolet—Saurel	QC	BQ	BQ	29,653	56.7%	20,321	38.8%	67.4%	9,332	8,434	2,732	29,653	1,697	489	–	–	52,337
Bellechasse—Les Etchemins—Lévis	QC	Con	Con	32,283	50.1%	17,529	27.2%	69.6%	10,734	32,283	3,256	14,754	1,925	1,307	–	188	64,447
Beloeil—Chambly	QC	NDP	BQ	35,068	50.5%	19,009	27.4%	73.7%	16,059	4,305	10,086	35,068	3,255	512	–	205	69,490
Berthier—Maskinongé	QC	NDP	BQ	21,200	37.6%	1,502	2.7%	68.0%	7,796	5,812	19,698	21,200	1,008	428	154	261	56,354
Bourassa	QC	Lib	Lib	23,231	57.6%	14,188	35.2%	59.1%	23,231	2,899	3,204	9,043	1,343	347	212	72	40,351
Brome—Missisquoi	QC	Lib	Lib	23,450	38.2%	2,298	3.7%	70.1%	23,450	7,697	4,887	21,152	3,302	456	–	497	61,441
Brossard—Saint-Lambert	QC	Lib	Lib	30,537	53.9%	19,406	34.3%	68.7%	30,537	6,112	5,410	11,131	2,935	527	–	–	56,652
Charlesbourg—Haute-Saint-Charles	QC	Con	Con	22,484	38.0%	6,431	10.8%	70.3%	12,584	22,484	4,554	16,053	2,042	1,379	–	–	59,096
Châteauguay—Lacolle	QC	Lib	Lib	20,118	38.4%	639	1.2%	68.4%	20,118	5,851	4,005	19,479	1,929	563	–	457	52,402
Chicoutimi—Le Fjord	QC	Lib	Con	16,155	36.8%	834	1.9%	68.3%	7,504	16,155	2,855	15,321	1,388	359	–	299	43,881
Compton—Stanstead	QC	Lib	Lib	21,731	37.3%	3,160	5.4%	70.2%	21,731	8,446	5,607	18,571	3,044	586	–	252	58,237
Dorval—Lachine—LaSalle	QC	Lib	Lib	27,821	52.9%	18,847	35.8%	62.5%	27,821	5,543	6,207	8,974	2,898	528	–	603	52,574
Drummond	QC	NDP	BQ	24,574	44.8%	15,022	27.4%	66.7%	9,552	9,083	8,716	24,574	1,856	525	–	518	54,824
Gaspésie—Les Îles-de-la-Madeleine	QC	Lib	Lib	16,296	42.5%	637	1.7%	60.5%	16,296	3,022	1,722	15,659	1,130	198	–	353	38,380
Gatineau	QC	Lib	Lib	29,084	52.1%	17,158	30.8%	67.0%	29,084	5,745	6,128	11,926	2,264	560	–	76	55,783
Hochelaga	QC	NDP	Lib	18,008	34.0%	328	0.6%	65.4%	18,008	2,381	11,451	17,680	2,618	377	–	522	53,037
Honoré-Mercier	QC	Lib	Lib	29,543	58.7%	19,564	38.8%	65.4%	29,543	4,808	4,130	9,979	1,373	459	–	71	50,363
Hull—Aylmer	QC	Lib	Lib	29,732	54.1%	21,721	39.5%	70.4%	29,732	4,979	7,467	8,011	3,869	638	–	297	54,993
Joliette	QC	BQ	BQ	33,590	58.2%	20,595	35.7%	66.3%	12,995	5,176	2,623	33,590	2,343	498	–	474	57,699
Jonquière	QC	NDP	BQ	17,577	35.6%	5,436	11.0%	69.3%	7,849	10,338	12,141	17,577	1,009	453	–	–	49,367
La Pointe-de-l'Île	QC	BQ	BQ	26,010	46.8%	9,112	16.4%	66.2%	16,898	3,984	6,057	26,010	1,910	388	–	287	55,534
La Prairie	QC	Lib	BQ	25,707	41.8%	3,203	5.2%	72.0%	22,504	5,540	4,744	25,707	2,565	393	–	100	61,553
Lac-Saint-Jean	QC	Con	BQ	23,839	44.0%	10,206	18.8%	65.6%	13,633	12,544	2,753	23,839	1,010	448	–	–	54,227
Lac-Saint-Louis	QC	Lib	Lib	34,622	58.2%	25,539	42.9%	71.6%	34,622	9,083	7,263	3,169	4,176	805	–	407	59,525
LaSalle—Émard—Verdun	QC	Lib	Lib	22,803	43.5%	10,184	19.4%	64.7%	22,803	3,690	8,628	12,619	3,583	490	274	304	52,391
Laurentides—Labelle	QC	Lib	BQ	30,625	46.8%	8,970	13.7%	66.2%	21,655	4,983	4,122	30,625	3,157	418	174	272	65,406
Laurier—Sainte-Marie	QC	NDP	Lib	22,306	41.8%	8,853	16.6%	65.4%	22,306	1,502	13,453	12,188	3,225	320	42	373	53,409
Laval—Les Îles	QC	Lib	Lib	26,031	48.2%	14,911	27.6%	65.8%	26,031	8,816	4,803	11,120	2,306	885	–	–	53,961
Lévis—Lotbinière	QC	Con	Con	28,297	44.6%	12,376	19.5%	72.4%	10,761	28,297	4,355	15,921	1,908	2,247	–	–	63,489
Longueuil—Charles-LeMoyne	QC	Lib	Lib	20,114	39.0%	1,320	2.6%	62.8%	20,114	3,811	5,289	18,794	2,978	558	–	–	51,544
Longueuil—Saint-Hubert	QC	NDP	BQ	23,061	38.5%	2,590	4.3%	69.9%	20,471	3,779	5,104	23,061	6,745	467	217	–	59,844
Louis-Hébert	QC	Lib	Lib	25,140	40.5%	7,765	12.5%	76.6%	25,140	10,912	4,884	17,375	2,466	1,016	267	–	62,060
Louis-Saint-Laurent	QC	Con	Con	29,279	44.7%	14,605	22.3%	70.7%	13,571	29,279	4,339	14,674	2,155	1,543	–	–	65,561
Manicouagan	QC	BQ	BQ	21,768	53.9%	13,975	34.6%	53.8%	7,793	7,771	1,482	21,768	1,293	283	–	–	40,390
Marc-Aurèle-Fortin	QC	Lib	Lib	24,865	44.5%	6,796	12.2%	72.4%	24,865	5,423	4,741	18,069	2,111	465	143	–	55,817
Mégantic—L'Érable	QC	Con	Con	23,392	49.2%	11,143	23.5%	68.5%	7,388	23,392	1,936	12,249	1,258	812	217	256	47,508
Mirabel	QC	BQ	BQ	33,219	51.1%	17,057	26.2%	68.7%	16,162	5,940	5,219	33,219	3,517	641	–	332	65,030
Montarville	QC	Lib	BQ	25,366	42.8%	4,305	7.3%	77.8%	21,061	4,138	4,984	25,366	2,967	501	–	211	59,228
Montcalm	QC	BQ	BQ	31,791	58.0%	20,591	37.6%	63.4%	11,200	4,942	3,514	31,791	2,416	524	–	419	54,806
Montmagny—L'Islet—Kamouraska—Rivière-du-Loup	QC	Con	Con	20,989	41.7%	4,728	9.4%	65.7%	8,210	20,989	3,481	16,261	1,030	417	–	–	50,388
Mount Royal	QC	Lib	Lib	24,590	56.3%	13,703	31.4%	60.5%	24,590	10,887	3,609	1,757	2,389	362	–	85	43,679
Notre-Dame-de-Grâce—Westmount	QC	Lib	Lib	28,323	56.3%	20,570	40.9%	66.4%	28,323	5,759	7,753	2,359	5,397	565	98	67	50,321
Outremont	QC	NDP	Lib	19,148	46.2%	10,829	26.1%	62.2%	19,148	2,707	8,319	5,741	5,018	369	–	155	41,457
Papineau	QC	Lib	Lib	25,957	51.1%	16,209	31.9%	65.5%	25,957	2,155	9,748	8,124	3,741	322	185	549	50,781
Pierre-Boucher—Les Patriotes—Verchères	QC	BQ	BQ	31,009	51.0%	13,676	22.5%	76.3%	17,333	4,910	4,192	31,009	2,955	384	–	–	60,783
Pierrefonds—Dollard	QC	Lib	Lib	31,305	56.4%	21,508	38.8%	67.4%	31,305	9,797	5,687	4,469	2,866	711	636	–	55,471
Pontiac	QC	Lib	Lib	30,217	48.9%	19,801	32.0%	68.2%	30,217	10,416	6,503	9,929	3,762	775	–	245	61,847
Portneuf—Jacques-Cartier	QC	Con	Con	28,110	43.5%	12,403	19.2%	70.9%	12,876	28,110	3,758	15,707	2,308	1,915	–	–	64,674
Québec	QC	Lib	Lib	18,047	33.3%	325	0.6%	70.0%	18,047	8,118	6,220	17,722	2,949	674	–	468	54,198
Repentigny	QC	BQ	BQ	34,837	53.2%	16,726	25.6%	72.2%	18,111	4,878	4,470	34,837	2,289	524	–	347	65,456
Richmond—Arthabaska	QC	Con	Con	26,553	45.3%	10,014	17.1%	68.8%	8,868	26,553	2,864	16,539	3,133	681	–	–	58,638
Rimouski-Neigette—Témiscouata—Les Basques	QC	NDP	BQ	17,314	37.8%	4,264	9.3%	66.5%	10,095	4,073	13,050	17,314	824	232	–	179	45,767
Rivière-des-Mille-Îles	QC	Lib	BQ	23,629	40.6%	2,620	4.5%	72.1%	21,009	4,684	5,002	23,629	3,015	845	–	–	58,184
Rivière-du-Nord	QC	BQ	BQ	31,281	52.0%	17,879	29.7%	64.0%	13,402	7,120	4,194	31,281	3,345	407	127	225	60,101
Rosemont—La Petite-Patrie	QC	NDP	NDP	25,575	42.5%	10,999	18.3%	71.4%	14,576	1,405	25,575	14,306	3,539	293	–	512	60,206
Saint-Hyacinthe—Bagot	QC	NDP	BQ	23,143	41.4%	11,240	20.1%	70.1%	11,903	8,062	10,297	23,143	2,031	478	–	–	55,914
Saint-Jean	QC	Lib	BQ	27,750	44.8%	8,844	14.3%	69.3%	18,906	6,612	4,794	27,750	3,127	397	–	289	61,875
Saint-Laurent	QC	Lib	Lib	23,527	58.6%	16,522	41.2%	60.0%	23,527	7,005	4,065	2,845	2,150	484	–	71	40,147
Saint-Léonard—Saint-Michel	QC	Lib	Lib	27,866	61.3%	22,443	49.4%	60.4%	27,866	5,423	2,964	4,351	1,183	501	3,061	85	45,434
Saint-Maurice—Champlain	QC	Lib	Lib	23,104	39.6%	3,154	5.4%	65.2%	23,104	9,542	3,071	19,950	1,809	938	–	–	58,414
Salaberry—Suroît	QC	NDP	BQ	29,975	47.7%	11,293	18.0%	67.0%	18,682	6,116	5,024	29,975	1,997	767	–	342	62,903
Shefford	QC	Lib	BQ	23,503	38.6%	898	1.5%	68.4%	22,605	7,495	3,705	23,503	2,814	497	–	294	60,913
Sherbrooke	QC	NDP	Lib	17,490	29.3%	609	1.0%	68.3%	17,490	6,362	16,881	15,470	2,716	–	588	219	59,726
Terrebonne	QC	BQ	BQ	31,029	50.6%	13,035	21.3%	70.5%	17,944	4,640	4,627	31,029	2,277	399	159	260	61,335
Thérèse-De Blainville	QC	Lib	BQ	24,486	41.8%	3,498	6.0%	72.1%	20,988	5,264	4,431	24,486	2,710	366	89	215	58,549
Trois-Rivières	QC	NDP	BQ	17,240	28.5%	1,466	2.4%	66.7%	15,774	15,240	10,090	17,240	1,492	565	137	–	60,538
Vaudreuil—Soulanges	QC	Lib	Lib	32,254	47.3%	15,654	23.0%	72.4%	32,254	7,804	7,368	16,600	3,405	711	–	–	68,142
Ville-Marie–Le Sud-Ouest–Île-des-Sœurs	QC	Lib	Lib	28,087	53.5%	19,813	37.7%	60.3%	28,087	4,609	8,274	6,899	3,718	520	230	185	52,522
Vimy	QC	Lib	Lib	26,490	47.7%	11,035	19.9%	64.3%	26,490	5,951	4,779	15,455	2,125	733	–	–	55,533
Battlefords—Lloydminster	SK	Con	Con	28,030	78.3%	23,932	66.8%	70.7%	2,426	28,030	4,098	–	605	662	–	–	35,821
Carlton Trail—Eagle Creek	SK	Con	Con	35,313	78.6%	29,778	66.2%	78.5%	2,085	35,313	5,535	–	873	799	344	–	44,949
Cypress Hills—Grasslands	SK	Con	Con	31,140	81.1%	27,474	71.5%	77.2%	1,595	31,140	3,666	–	719	1,075	220	–	38,415
Desnethé—Missinippi—Churchill River	SK	NDP	Con	11,531	42.3%	3,790	13.9%	59.8%	7,225	11,531	7,741	–	543	217	–	–	27,257
Moose Jaw—Lake Centre—Lanigan	SK	Con	Con	31,993	71.1%	24,333	54.1%	76.9%	2,517	31,993	7,660	–	1,201	1,613	–	–	44,984
Prince Albert	SK	Con	Con	26,891	67.7%	19,996	50.3%	69.8%	4,107	26,891	6,925	–	839	778		170	39,710
Regina—Lewvan	SK	NDP	Con	27,088	52.5%	12,321	23.9%	75.9%	6,826	27,088	14,767	–	2,099	573	201	60	51,614
Regina—Qu'Appelle	SK	Con	Con	24,463	63.1%	16,778	43.3%	70.7%	4,543	24,463	7,685	–	1,282	513	78	191	38,755
Regina—Wascana	SK	Lib	Con	22,418	49.4%	7,176	15.8%	76.3%	15,242	22,418	5,801	–	1,316	450	128	–	45,355
Saskatoon West	SK	Con	Con	18,597	47.7%	2,889	7.4%	64.7%	2,863	18,597	15,708	–	1,042	775	–	–	38,985
Saskatoon—Grasswood	SK	Con	Con	26,336	53.3%	13,664	27.6%	77.6%	8,419	26,336	12,672	–	1,320	692	–	–	49,439
Saskatoon—University	SK	NDP	Con	24,514	52.1%	10,520	22.4%	77.3%	6,146	24,514	13,994	–	1,401	667	–	305	47,027
Souris—Moose Mountain	SK	Con	Con	35,067	84.4%	31,853	76.7%	80.2%	1,718	35,067	3,214	–	681	702	–	168	41,550
Yorkton—Melville	SK	Con	Con	29,523	76.2%	24,776	63.9%	74.0%	2,488	29,523	4,747	–	1,070	941			38,769
Northwest Territories	Terr	Lib	Lib	6,467	39.7%	2,310	14.2%	54.3%	6,467	4,157	3,640	–	1,731	296	–	–	16,291
Nunavut	Terr	Lib	NDP	3,861	40.8%	943	10.0%	51.1%	2,918	2,469	3,861	–	206	–	–	–	9,454
Yukon	Terr	Lib	Lib	7,034	33.5%	153	0.7%	73.2%	7,034	6,881	4,617	–	2,201	284	–	–	21,017

== Results overview ==
=== Summary analysis ===
↓
157	121	32	24	3	1
Liberal	Conservative	BQ	NDP	G	I

Party	Votes			Seats	
Liberal	6,018,728	33.1%	▼6.4pp	157 / 338 (46%)	▼27
Conservative	6,239,227	34.3%	▲2.5pp	121 / 338 (36%)	▲22
Bloc Québécois	1,384,030	7.6%	▲3.0pp	32 / 338 (9%)	▲22
New Democratic	2,903,722	16.0%	▼3.8pp	24 / 338 (7%)	▼20
Green	1,189,607	6.5%	▲3.0pp	3 / 338 (0.9%)	▲1
Independent	75,836	0.4%	▲0.1pp	1 / 338 (0.3%)	▲1

Seats, of total, by party
1. Liberal (46.4%)
2. Conservative (35.8%)
3. NDP (7.10%)
4. Bloc Québécois (9.50%)
5. Green (0.90%)
6. Independent and other (0.30%)
Votes, of total, by party
1. Liberal (33.1%)
2. Conservative (34.4%)
3. NDP (15.9%)
4. Bloc Québécois (7.70%)
5. Green (6.50%)
6. People's (1.70%)
7. Independent and other (0.70%)

Popular vote
Conservative	34.34%
Liberal	33.12%
NDP	15.98%
Bloc Québécois	7.63%
Green	6.55%
Others	2.38%

Seat totals
Liberal	46.45%
Conservative	35.80%
Bloc Québécois	9.47%
NDP	7.10%
Green	0.89%
Independents	0.30%

=== Change in popular vote ===
Change in popular vote by party (2019 vs 2015)
Party	2019	2015	Change (pp)
█ Liberal	33.12%	39.47%	-6.35
█ Conservative	34.34%	31.91%	2.43
█ Bloc Québécois	7.63%	4.67%	2.96
█ New Democratic	15.98%	19.73%	-3.75
█ Green	6.55%	3.43%	3.12
█ People's	1.64%	New	1.64
█ Other	0.67%	0.79%	-0.12

=== Results by province ===
Distribution of seats and popular vote %, by party by province/territory (2019)
Party name		BC	AB	SK	MB	ON	QC	NB	NS	PE	NL	YT	NT	NU	Total
Liberal	Seats:	11	–	–	4	79	35	6	10	4	6	1	1	–	157
Liberal	Vote:	26.2	13.8	11.7	26.5	41.6	34.3	37.5	41.4	43.7	44.9	33.5	39.7	30.9	33.1
Conservative	Seats:	17	33	14	7	36	10	3	1	–	–	–	–	–	121
Conservative	Vote:	34.0	69.0	64.0	45.2	33.1	16.0	32.8	25.7	27.3	27.9	32.7	25.5	26.1	34.3
NDP	Seats:	11	1	–	3	6	1	–	–	–	1	–	–	1	24
NDP	Vote:	24.4	11.6	19.6	20.8	16.8	10.8	9.4	18.9	7.6	23.7	22.0	22.3	40.8	16.0
Bloc Québécois	Seats:						32								32
Bloc Québécois	Vote:						32.4								7.6
Green	Seats:	2	–	–	–	–	–	1	–	–	–	–	–	–	3
Green	Vote:	12.5	2.8	2.6	5.1	6.2	4.5	17.2	11.0	20.9	3.1	10.5	10.6	2.2	6.5
People's	Seats:	–	–	–	–	–	–	–	–	–	–	–	–	–	–
People's	Vote:	1.7	2.2	1.8	1.7	1.6	1.5	2.0	1.2	–	0.1	1.4	1.8	–	1.6
Independents and others	Seats:	1	–	–	–	–	–	–	–	–	–	–	–	–	1
Independents and others	Vote:	0.9	0.8	0.2	0.6	0.2	0.1	0.1	0.3	–	–	–	–	–	0.2
Seats:		42	34	14	14	121	78	10	11	4	7	1	1	1	338

Proportion of seats won in each province/territory, by party (2019)
Province	Liberal	Conservative	NDP	Bloc	Green
Ontario	79 / 121	36 / 121	6 / 121	—N/a	0 / 121
Quebec	35 / 78	10 / 78	1 / 78	32 / 78	0 / 78
Nova Scotia	10 / 11	1 / 11	0 / 11	—N/a	0 / 11
New Brunswick	6 / 10	3 / 10	0 / 10	—N/a	1 / 10
Manitoba	4 / 14	7 / 14	3 / 14	—N/a	0 / 14
British Columbia	11 / 42	17 / 42	11 / 42	—N/a	2 / 42
Prince Edward Island	4 / 4	0 / 4	0 / 4	—N/a	0 / 4
Saskatchewan	0 / 14	14 / 14	0 / 14	—N/a	0 / 14
Alberta	0 / 34	33 / 34	1 / 34	—N/a	0 / 34
Newfoundland and Labrador	6 / 7	0 / 7	1 / 7	—N/a	0 / 7
Northern Canada	2 / 3	0 / 3	1 / 3	—N/a	0 / 3
Total	157 / 338	121 / 338	24 / 338	32 / 338	3 / 338

== Seats won and lost by party ==
Elections to the 43rd Parliament of Canada – seats won/lost by party, 2015–2019
Party	2015	Gain from (loss to)									2019
Party	2015	Lib		Con		NDP		BQ	Grn	Ind	2019
Liberal	184			2	(21)	5	(3)	(8)	(1)	(1)	157
Conservative	99	21	(2)			6		(3)			121
New Democratic	44	3	(5)		(6)			(11)	(1)		24
Bloc Québécois	10	8		3		11					32
Green	1	1				1					3
Independent	–	1									1
Total	338	34	(7)	5	(27)	23	(3)	(22)	(2)	(1)	338

The following 62 seats (representing 18.34 percent of seats in the House of Commons) changed allegiance from the 2015 election:

Liberal to Conservative (22)

- Aurora—Oak Ridges—Richmond Hill (Note: Leona Alleslev had previously crossed the floor from the Liberals in 2018)
- Calgary Centre
- Calgary Skyview
- Charleswood—St. James—Assiniboia—Headingley
- Chicoutimi—Le Fjord
- Cloverdale—Langley City
- Edmonton Centre
- Edmonton Mill Woods
- Fundy Royal
- Hastings—Lennox and Addington
- Kelowna—Lake Country
- Kenora
- Kildonan—St. Paul
- Mission—Matsqui—Fraser Canyon
- New Brunswick Southwest
- Northumberland—Peterborough South
- Pitt Meadows—Maple Ridge
- Regina—Wascana
- Steveston—Richmond East
- Tobique—Mactaquac
- West Nova

NDP to Bloc (11)

- Abitibi—Baie-James—Nunavik—Eeyou
- Abitibi—Témiscamingue
- Beloeil—Chambly
- Berthier—Maskinongé
- Drummond
- Jonquière
- Longueuil—Saint-Hubert
- Rimouski-Neigette—Témiscouata—Les Basques
- Saint-Hyacinthe—Bagot
- Salaberry—Suroît
- Trois-Rivières

Liberal to Bloc (8)

- Avignon—La Mitis—Matane—Matapédia
- La Prairie
- Laurentides—Labelle
- Montarville
- Rivière-des-Mille-Îles
- Saint-Jean
- Shefford
- Thérèse-De Blainville

NDP to Conservative (6)

- Desnethé—Missinippi—Churchill River
- Essex
- Kootenay—Columbia
- Port Moody—Coquitlam
- Regina—Lewvan
- Saskatoon West

NDP to Liberal (5)

- Hochelaga
- Laurier—Sainte-Marie
- Outremont
- Sherbrooke
- Windsor—Tecumseh

Liberal to NDP (3)

- Nunavut
- St. John's East
- Winnipeg Centre

Conservative to Bloc (3)

- Beauport—Côte-de-Beaupré—Île d'Orléans—Charlevoix
- Beauport—Limoilou
- Lac-Saint-Jean

Conservative to Liberal (2)

- Kitchener—Conestoga
- Milton

Liberal to Green (1)

- Fredericton

NDP to Green (1)

- Nanaimo—Ladysmith

Liberal to Independent (1)

- Vancouver Granville

The reasons for the changes were:

Reason	# of MPs
Defeated in general election	45
Open seats that changed hands	11
Vacancies previously filled in by-elections; subsequently retained	3
Vacancies previously filled in by-elections; subsequently lost to another party	1
Standing under different political affiliation	2
Total	62

=== Defeated MPs ===
MPs defeated (2019)
Party (2015)	Riding	MP	First elected	Defeated by	Party
█ Liberal	Avignon—La Mitis—Matane—Matapédia	Rémi Massé	2015	Kristina Michaud	█ Bloc Québécois
█ Liberal	Calgary Centre	Kent Hehr	2015	Greg McLean	█ Conservative
█ Liberal	Charleswood—St. James—Assiniboia—Headingley	Doug Eyolfson	2015	Marty Morantz	█ Conservative
█ Liberal	Cloverdale—Langley City	John Aldag	2015	Tamara Jansen	█ Conservative
█ Liberal	Edmonton Centre	Randy Boissonnault	2015	James Cumming	█ Conservative
█ Liberal	Edmonton Mill Woods	Amarjeet Sohi	2015	Tim Uppal (Note: previously served as MP in 2008-2015)	█ Conservative
█ Liberal	Fredericton	Matt DeCourcey	2015	Jenica Atwin	█ Green
█ Liberal	Fundy Royal	Alaina Lockhart	2015	Rob Moore (Note: previously served as MP in 2004-2015)	█ Conservative
█ Liberal	Hastings—Lennox and Addington	Mike Bossio	2015	Derek Sloan	█ Conservative
█ Liberal	Kelowna—Lake Country	Stephen Fuhr	2015	Tracy Gray	█ Conservative
█ Liberal	Kenora	Bob Nault	2015	Eric Melillo	█ Conservative
█ Liberal	Kildonan—St. Paul	MaryAnn Mihychuk	2015	Raquel Dancho	█ Conservative
█ Liberal	La Prairie	Jean-Claude Poissant	2015	Alain Therrien	█ Bloc Québécois
█ Liberal	Laurentides—Labelle	David Graham	2015	Marie-Hélène Gaudreau	█ Bloc Québécois
█ Liberal	Mission—Matsqui—Fraser Canyon	Jati Sidhu	2015	Brad Vis	█ Conservative
█ Liberal	Montarville	Michel Picard	2015	Stéphane Bergeron	█ Bloc Québécois
█ Liberal	New Brunswick Southwest	Karen Ludwig	2015	John Williamson (Note: previously served as MP in 2011-2015)	█ Conservative
█ Liberal	Northumberland—Peterborough South	Kim Rudd	2015	Philip Lawrence	█ Conservative
█ Liberal	Pitt Meadows—Maple Ridge	Dan Ruimy	2015	Marc Dalton	█ Conservative
█ Liberal	Regina—Wascana	Ralph Goodale	1993	Michael Kram	█ Conservative
█ Liberal	Rivière-des-Mille-Îles	Linda Lapointe	2015	Luc Desilets	█ Bloc Québécois
█ Liberal	Saint-Jean	Jean Rioux	2015	Christine Normandin	█ Bloc Québécois
█ Liberal	St. John's East	Nick Whalen	2015	Jack Harris (Note: previously served as MP in 2008-2015)	█ New Democratic
█ Liberal	Shefford	Pierre Breton	2015	Andréanne Larouche	█ Bloc Québécois
█ Liberal	Steveston—Richmond East	Joe Peschisolido	2015 (Note: previously served as Alliance MP in 2000-2004)	Kenny Chiu	█ Conservative
█ Liberal	Thérèse-De Blainville	Ramez Ayoub	2015	Louise Chabot	█ Bloc Québécois
█ Liberal	Winnipeg Centre	Robert-Falcon Ouellette	2015	Leah Gazan	█ New Democratic
█ New Democratic	Beloeil—Chambly	Matthew Dubé	2011	Yves-François Blanchet	█ Bloc Québécois
█ New Democratic	Berthier—Maskinongé	Ruth Ellen Brosseau	2011	Yves Perron	█ Bloc Québécois
█ New Democratic	Desnethé—Missinippi—Churchill River	Georgina Jolibois	2015	Gary Vidal	█ Conservative
█ New Democratic	Drummond	François Choquette	2011	Martin Champoux	█ Bloc Québécois
█ New Democratic	Essex	Tracey Ramsey	2015	Chris Lewis	█ Conservative
█ New Democratic	Jonquière	Karine Trudel	2015	Mario Simard	█ Bloc Québécois
█ New Democratic	Kootenay—Columbia	Wayne Stetski	2015	Rob Morrison	█ Conservative
█ New Democratic	Longueuil—Saint-Hubert	Pierre Nantel (Note: expelled from NDP caucus in 2019; stood as a Green candidate in general election)	2011	Denis Trudel	█ Bloc Québécois
█ New Democratic	Rimouski-Neigette—Témiscouata—Les Basques	Guy Caron	2011	Maxime Blanchette-Joncas	█ Bloc Québécois
█ New Democratic	Saint-Hyacinthe—Bagot	Brigitte Sansoucy	2015	Simon-Pierre Savard-Tremblay	█ Bloc Québécois
█ New Democratic	Saskatoon West	Sheri Benson	2015	Brad Redekopp	█ Conservative
█ New Democratic	Sherbrooke	Pierre-Luc Dusseault	2011	Élisabeth Brière	█ Liberal
█ New Democratic	Trois-Rivières	Robert Aubin	2011	Louise Charbonneau	█ Bloc Québécois
█ New Democratic	Windsor—Tecumseh	Cheryl Hardcastle	2015	Irek Kusmierczyk	█ Liberal
█ Conservative	Beauport—Côte-de-Beaupré—Île d'Orléans—Charlevoix	Sylvie Boucher	2015 (Note: previously served as MP in 2006-2011)	Caroline Desbiens	█ Bloc Québécois
█ Conservative	Beauport—Limoilou	Alupa Clarke	2015	Julie Vignola	█ Bloc Québécois
█ Conservative	Kitchener—Conestoga	Harold Albrecht	2006	Tim Louis	█ Liberal
█ Conservative	Milton	Lisa Raitt	2008	Adam van Koeverden	█ Liberal

=== Open seats that changed hands ===
Of the 44 seats that were open at dissolution, 11 were won by candidates of non-incumbent parties:

Open seats that changed hands (2019)
Party (2015)	Electoral district	Outgoing MP	Won by	Party
█ Liberal	Calgary Skyview	Darshan Kang	Jag Sahota	█ Conservative
█ Liberal	Nunavut	Hunter Tootoo	Mumilaaq Qaqqaq	█ New Democratic
█ Liberal	Tobique—Mactaquac	T. J. Harvey	Richard Bragdon	█ Conservative
█ Liberal	West Nova	Colin Fraser	Chris d'Entremont	█ Conservative
█ New Democratic	Abitibi—Baie-James—Nunavik—Eeyou	Romeo Saganash	Sylvie Bérubé	█ Bloc Québécois
█ New Democratic	Abitibi—Témiscamingue	Christine Moore	Sébastien Lemire	█ Bloc Québécois
█ New Democratic	Hochelaga	Marjolaine Boutin-Sweet	Soraya Martinez Ferrada	█ Liberal
█ New Democratic	Laurier—Sainte-Marie	Hélène Laverdière	Steven Guilbeault	█ Liberal
█ New Democratic	Port Moody—Coquitlam	Fin Donnelly	Nelly Shin	█ Conservative
█ New Democratic	Regina—Lewvan	Erin Weir	Warren Steinley	█ Conservative
█ New Democratic	Salaberry—Suroît	Anne Minh-Thu Quach	Claude DeBellefeuille	█ Bloc Québécois

=== Vacancies filled in earlier by-elections ===
Three open seats were filled in earlier by-elections, retained by the winners in the ensuing general election:

Seats that changed hands in earlier by-elections; subsequently retained
Party (2015)	Electoral district	Outgoing MP	Won by	Party
█ Liberal	Chicoutimi—Le Fjord	Denis Lemieux	Richard Martel (2018)	█ Conservative
█ New Democratic	Nanaimo—Ladysmith	Sheila Malcolmson	Paul Manly (2019)	█ Green
█ New Democratic	Outremont	Tom Mulcair	Rachel Bendayan (2019)	█ Liberal

Two vacancies were filled in earlier by-elections, but the winners failed to keep them in the general election. They were both upset votes in favour of the Liberals, where one subsequently returned to the previous party, while the other went to a third party.

Seats that changed hands in earlier by-elections; subsequently turned over
Party (2015)	Electoral district	Outgoing MP	Won by	Party	Ousted by	Party
█ Conservative	Lac-Saint-Jean	Denis Lebel	Richard Hébert (2017)	█ Liberal	Alexis Brunelle-Duceppe	█ Bloc Québécois
█ Conservative	South Surrey—White Rock	Dianne Watts	Gordie Hogg (2017)	█ Liberal	Kerry-Lynne Findlay	█ Conservative

=== MPs standing under a different political affiliation ===
Leona Alleslev had previously crossed the floor from the Liberals to the Conservatives in 2018, and was subsequently re-elected as a Conservative. Jody Wilson-Raybould contested her seat as an independent and won, after having been expelled from the Liberal caucus.

MP	Riding	2015	2019
Leona Alleslev	Aurora—Oak Ridges—Richmond Hill	█ Liberal	█ Conservative
Jody Wilson-Raybould	Vancouver Granville	█ Liberal	█ Independent

== Swing analysis within the largest provinces ==
Results in BC (2019 vs 2015)
Party	Seats				Votes		
Party	2015	Gained	Lost	2019	Total	%	Change (%)
Conservative	10	7	–	17	799,239	34.1	+4.1
Liberal	17	–	-6	11	612,098	26.1	-9.1
New Democratic	14	–	-3	11	572,063	24.4	-1.5
Green	1	1	–	2	290,629	12.4	+4.2
People's	–	–	–	–	39,549	1.7	New
Independent and other	–	1	–	1	30,182	1.3	+0.6
Total	42				2,343,760	Turnout	65.0%
Liberal to Conservative swing							6.6%
Liberal to Green swing							6.6%

Results in Alberta (2019 vs 2015)
Party	Seats				Votes		
Party	2015	Gained	Lost	2019	Total	%	Change (%)
Conservative	29	4	–	33	1,413,360	69.2	+9.7
Liberal	4	–	-4	–	280,309	13.7	-10.9
New Democratic	1	–	–	1	235,013	11.5	-0.1
Green	–	–	–	–	57,468	2.8	+0.3
Independent and other	–	–	–	–	9,476	0.6	-1.2
Total	34				2,041,445	Turnout	68.5%
Liberal to Conservative swing							10.3%

Results in Saskatchewan (2019 vs 2015)
Party	Seats				Votes		
Party	2015	Gained	Lost	2019	Total	%	Change (%)
Conservative	10	4	–	14	366,611	64.3	+15.8
New Democratic	3	–	-3	–	111,379	19.5	-5.6
Liberal	1	–	-1	–	66,031	11.6	-12.3
Green	–	–	–	–	14,417	2.5	+0.4
People's	–	–	–	–	10,211	1.8	New
Independent and other	–	–	–	–	1,856	0.3	-0.1
Total	14				570,505	Turnout	71.7%
Liberal to Conservative swing							14.0%

Results in Manitoba (2019 vs 2015)
Party	Seats				Votes		
Party	2015	Gained	Lost	2019	Total	%	Change (%)
Conservative	5	2	–	7	264,071	45.4	+8.1
Liberal	7	–	-3	4	152,803	26.3	-18.3
New Democratic	2	1	–	3	120,533	20.7	+6.9
Green	–	–	–	–	29,768	5.1	+1.9
People's	–	–	–	–	10,021	1.7	New
Independent and other	–	–	–	–	3,840	0.8	-0.3
Total	14				581,036	Turnout	63.8%
Liberal to Conservative swing							13.2%

Results in Ontario (2019 vs 2015)
Party	Seats				Votes		
Party	2015	Gained	Lost	2019	Total	%	Change (%)
Liberal	80	2	-3	79	2,814,010	41.5	-3.3
Conservative	33	3	–	36	2,252,238	33.2	-1.8
New Democratic	8	–	-2	6	1,138,735	16.8	+0.2
Green	–	–	–	–	420,397	6.2	+3.3
People's	–	–	–	–	107,673	1.6	New
Independent and other	–	–	–	–	53,989	0.7	–
Total	121				6,787,042	Turnout	65.3%
Liberal to Green swing							3.3%

Results in Quebec (2019 vs 2015)
Party	Seats				Votes		
Party	2015	Gained	Lost	2019	Total	%	Change (%)
Liberal	40	1	-6	35	1,447,712	34.2	-1.5
Bloc Québécois	10	22	–	32	1,376,135	32.5	+13.2
Conservative	12	1	-3	10	677,283	16.0	-0.7
New Democratic	16	–	-15	1	454,550	10.7	-14.7
Green	–	–	–	–	188,347	4.4	+2.1
People's	–	–	–	–	63,203	1.5	New
Independent and other	–	–	–	–	23,408	0.1	+0.1
Total	78				4,230,638	Turnout	65.5%
NDP to Bloc Québécois swing							13.9%

== Voter demographics ==
=== Post-election analysis from Elections Canada ===
Elections Canada reported the following general characteristics of voter turnout in the election, compared to 2015:

Estimated voter turnout %, by age and sex, all Canada (2019 v 2015)
Age group	All voters			Male			Female		
Age group	2019	2015	Change (pp)	2019	2015	Change (pp)	2019	2015	Change (pp)
First-time voters	53.6	58.3	4.7▼	49.7	54.9	5.2▼	57.7	61.9	4.2▼
Not first time	54.2	55.1	0.9▼	50.2	52.0	1.8▼	58.4	58.3	0.1▲
18–24 yrs	53.9	57.1	3.2▼	49.9	53.8	3.9▼	58.0	60.5	2.5▼
25–34 yrs	58.4	57.4	1.0▲	55.5	54.3	1.2▲	61.3	60.6	0.7▲
35–44 yrs	64.6	61.9	2.7▲	62.7	58.7	4.0▲	66.4	65.1	1.3▲
45–54 yrs	68.1	66.6	1.5▲	66.7	63.6	3.1▲	69.5	69.6	0.1▼
55–64 yrs	73.3	73.7	0.4▼	71.9	71.4	0.5▲	74.6	76.0	1.4▼
65–74 yrs	79.1	78.8	0.3▲	78.9	79.0	0.1▼	79.2	78.6	0.6▲
75 yrs +	68.6	67.4	1.2▲	72.3	74.1	1.8▼	65.7	62.8	2.9▼
All ages	67.0	66.1	0.9▲	65.5	64.1	1.4▲	68.5	68.0	0.5▲

=== From polling firms after Election Day ===
==== Per Ipsos ====
Ipsos 2019 election day poll
Social group	Liberal	Conservative	NDP	Bloc	Green	PPC	Other
Actual results
Total vote	33	34	16	8	6	2	1
Gender
Male	32	36	14	7	6	4	1
Female	31	31	22	7	7	2	1
Age
18–34	31	31	26	4	7	5	1
35–54	31	33	19	7	7	2	1
55+	32	39	12	9	5	2	1

==== Per Leger ====
Leger post-election poll (2019)
Social group	Liberal	Conservative	NDP	Bloc	Green	PPC	Other
Actual results
Total vote	33	34	16	8	6	2	1
Gender
Male	31	37	15	8	6	2	1
Female	35	31	17	7	8	1	1
Age
18–34	30	29	24	6	9	1	1
35–54	32	37	15	5	6	2	2
55+	35	35	12	10	6	2	0

==== Per Abacus ====
Abacus post-election poll (2019)
Social group	Liberal	Conservative	NDP	Bloc	Green	PPC	Other
Actual results
Total vote	33	34	16	8	6	2	1
Age
18–29	34	23	26	N/A	9	N/A	N/A
30–44	34	35	18	7	5	N/A	N/A
45–59	33	36	12	8	8	N/A	N/A
60+	31	38	12	10	7	N/A	N/A

=== Canadian Election Study ===
The 2019 CES included two survey components. Both included two waves of questions, one in the campaign period (CPS) and a recontact wave after the election (PES).

The non-probability online survey included a sample of Canadians from across the country (CPS n=37,822; PES n=10,337). The goal was to gather enough data to allow for constituency-level analysis as well as proper subgroup analysis of populations that are typically underrepresented in the CES.

The RDD internet survey largely replicated the larger online study, although it contained fewer questions and has a smaller sample (CPS n=4,021; PES n=2,889).

In both surveys, the core questions were drawn from previous CES (to preserve continuity) on key issues such as vote intentions, issue positions, partisanship, and political engagement.

The 2019 Canadian Election Study was led by Laura Stephenson, Allison Harell, Daniel Rubenson and Peter Loewen.

The table below is the indicated vote choice in the 2019 election from the PES, cross-tabbed with demographic questions. The weights have been adjusted to match the actual results of the election.

==== Demographics ====
Demographic Subgroup	LPC	CPC	NDP	BQC	GPC	PPC	Other	Sample
Total Vote	33.1	34.3	16.0	7.6	6.5	1.6	0.2	10,337
Gender
Men	32.6	37.6	12.0	9.4	5.4	1.7	1.2	3,901
Women	33.7	31.3	19.7	5.9	7.6	1.5	0.3	4,058
Age
18-29	34.8	22.7	28.3	4.9	7.7	1.6	0.0	1,101
30-39	33.3	30.8	19.2	6.0	7.0	2.9	0.7	1,551
40-49	30.2	36.1	16.0	6.7	7.9	1.7	1.4	1,275
50-59	32.0	36.0	13.3	8.9	6.8	1.8	1.2	1,247
60-69	33.4	38.0	11.3	10.7	5.1	1.0	0.6	1,577
70-79	35.4	37.6	10.4	10.2	5.2	0.7	0.7	738
80+	34.9	46.1	8.8	4.5	5.1	0.4	0.3	494
Language
English	34.2	38.2	17.3	0.8	7.0	1.6	0.8	6,656
French	27.8	15.0	9.4	41.8	4.1	1.7	0.3	1,327
Highest Education Attainment
High School or Less	29.5	36.0	15.1	10.1	6.6	1.9	0.7	3,982
College	30.5	37.6	17.7	5.3	6.5	1.7	0.6	1,824
University	41.9	28.4	16.1	5.0	6.5	1.1	1.0	2,169
Religion
Atheist	32.6	27.3	21.4	7.6	9.1	1.3	0.7	2,231
Agnostic	34.5	22.4	23.7	4.6	11.1	3.2	0.6	523
Buddhist	35.3	24.6	30.0	1.2	4.4	1.8	2.6	73
Hindu	39.7	36.2	13.5	0.0	10.6	0.0	0.0	37
Jewish	46.2	43.2	7.9	0.0	1.9	0.8	0.0	112
Muslim/Islam	81.1	10.0	8.1	0.0	0.8	0.0	0.0	115
Sikh	50.6	22.3	23.2	0.0	2.0	1.9	0.0	37
Christian	31.9	39.5	12.5	9.3	4.7	1.5	0.6	4,274
Catholic	34.5	31.3	12.2	16.2	4.0	1.1	0.6	2,297
Protestant & Other Christian	28.8	48.9	12.8	1.4	5.4	1.9	0.7	1,977
Other Religion	30.7	36.1	14.4	1.6	8.9	4.0	4.2	231
Ethnicity
Indigenous	26.6	36.8	25.2	2.1	6.3	1.6	1.4	390
European	31.7	34.1	15.8	9.3	6.5	1.7	0.9	6,272
Chinese	40.7	39.9	9.8	0.4	8.3	0.3	0.6	278
Hispanic	46.6	25.2	14.6	0.6	9.4	1.5	2.1	86
Indian	52.7	30.9	12.4	0.0	2.0	1.9	0.0	120
Other	39.1	30.7	19.0	1.0	7.4	1.9	0.9	1,071
Income
0-30,000	31.8	27.1	20.3	9.5	8.5	2.6	0.3	1,161
30,001-60,000	32.8	31.0	16.9	9.3	7.6	1.7	0.8	2,038
60,001-90,000	32.0	36.6	15.2	8.6	5.6	1.2	0.7	1,848
90,001-110,000	33.6	36.2	17.6	4.4	5.6	2.0	0.5	806
110,001-150,000	36.3	38.2	12.5	5.6	6.0	1.2	0.3	1,004
150,001-200,000	35.1	41.1	9.7	4.4	5.8	2.0	1.8	402
>200,000	33.4	42.2	8.6	5.6	5.9	0.4	4.1	235
Home Ownership
Own a residence	32.5	38.9	13.3	6.9	6.1	1.4	0.8	5,483
Don't own a residence	34.5	24.3	21.8	9.2	7.4	2.0	0.7	2,500
Do you live in...
A rural area or village	24.4	45.0	13.3	5.7	7.5	2.2	1.9	849
A town	26.0	37.8	15.8	11.4	6.4	2.2	0.5	1,059
A suburb	39.1	31.1	14.1	7.4	6.6	1.3	0.5	908
A city	36.2	31.4	17.9	6.1	6.4	1.3	0.8	1,875
Marital Status
Married	32.4	41.9	12.6	4.8	5.8	1.7	0.7	3,663
Not Married	33.7	27.8	18.7	10.1	7.2	1.6	0.8	4,276
Do you have children?
Yes	30.9	39.8	12.9	8.1	5.8	1.6	0.9	4,607
No	36.1	26.7	20.4	6.9	7.6	1.7	0.6	3,343
Employment
Full-time	33.2	34.1	16.3	7.3	6.4	1.5	1.1	3,476
Part-time	37.1	28.3	19.2	5.8	7.7	1.7	0.3	618
Self employed	31.6	38.5	11.7	4.9	9.5	3.4	0.4	459
Retired	33.7	38.6	10.9	10.2	5.0	0.9	0.7	2,197
Unemployed	28.5	33.6	21.5	3.9	8.0	4.1	0.3	286
Student	32.4	15.8	34.1	6.7	10.7	0.3	0.0	229
Caregiver/Homemaker	22.6	39.7	20.3	6.4	6.7	4.2	0.0	244
Disabled	32.2	31.8	20.1	6.3	6.8	2.1	0.8	260
Do you belong to a union?
Yes	34.3	28.6	21.5	7.3	6.1	1.5	0.8	1,470
No	32.9	35.8	14.6	7.7	6.7	1.6	0.8	6,468

== Strategic voting and vote splitting ==
Strategic voting may have played a significant part in determining the results. A survey by Angus Reid, issued several days after the election, revealed that 23% of undecided voters did not make up their mind until election day. Of that number, 52% voted for the candidate and party they liked, while 48% voted based on who they disliked the least. Of all undecided voters, 45% cast their vote for the Liberals, while 25% supported the Conservatives. NDP voters were the least likely group to have made up their mind early on in the campaign. An Ipsos-Reid exit poll conducted on election day found that 26% of all voters made their choice as to try to ensure which party did not win, and the Liberals were the main beneficiary of such activity. (Apparently these decisions were based on perception of the local situation so the vote was used - when used strategically - to try to produce the election of a local candidate not so well liked but definitely more liked than a competitor in that same district.)

Vote splitting skewed the results in many ridings. Vote splitting did not arise from multiple candidates of the same party running in a district (as that did not happen anywhere in Canada in this election) but from like-minded candidates of different parties running in the same district. Thus this analysis is based on somewhat arbitrary grouping of votes of like-minded parties despite different party labels into single voting blocks. Vote-splitting mainly benefited the Conservatives in Ontario and Metro Vancouver, the Liberals in Quebec and the Maritimes, and the NDP in BC and Ontario outside the GTA, while the Bloc benefited from multiple splits in the federalist parties, a wide group of all the nationwide parties that ran candidates in Quebec. The seats affected (where 2nd and 3rd place votes combined were greater than what the 1st place candidate received) are summarized thus:

Effect of vote splitting, by province (2019)
Parties			Province/territory											Totals	
1st	2nd	3rd	BC	AB	SK	MB	ON	QC	NB	NS	PE	NL	NU	Totals	
█ Liberal	█ Bloc Québécois	█ Conservative						8						8	21
█ Liberal	█ Bloc Québécois	█ New Democratic						4						4	21
█ Liberal	█ Conservative	█ Green	1				2		1	1	1			6	21
█ Liberal	█ Conservative	█ Independent							1					1	21
█ Liberal	█ Green	█ Conservative									1			1	21
█ Liberal	█ New Democratic	█ Green								1				1	21
█ Conservative	█ Bloc Québécois	█ Liberal						4						4	32
█ Conservative	█ Liberal	█ New Democratic	6	1	1	2	15							25	32
█ Conservative	█ Liberal	█ Green					1			1				2	32
█ Conservative	█ People's	█ Bloc Québécois						1						1	32
█ Bloc Québécois	█ Conservative	█ Liberal						2						2	13
█ Bloc Québécois	█ Liberal	█ Conservative						5						5	13
█ Bloc Québécois	█ Liberal	█ Green						1						1	13
█ Bloc Québécois	█ Liberal	█ New Democratic						3						3	13
█ Bloc Québécois	█ New Democratic	█ Liberal						2						2	13
█ New Democratic	█ Conservative	█ Green	4											4	19
█ New Democratic	█ Conservative	█ Liberal	3	1		1	2							7	19
█ New Democratic	█ Liberal	█ Bloc Québécois						1						1	19
█ New Democratic	█ Liberal	█ Conservative				1	3					1	1	6	19
█ New Democratic	█ Liberal	█ Green	1											1	19
█ Green	█ Liberal	█ Conservative							1					1	1
█ Independent	█ Conservative	█ Liberal	1											1	1
Total			16	2	1	4	23	31	3	3	2	1	1	87	

== Closest victories and greatest landslides ==
10 closest races by vote count (2019)
Electoral district		1st-place candidate	2nd-place candidate	Margin
Port Moody—Coquitlam	BC	Nelly Shin	Bonita Zarrillo	153
Yukon	YK	Larry Bagnell	Jonas Smith	153
Richmond Hill	ON	Majid Jowhari	Costas Menegakis	212
Québec	QC	Jean-Yves Duclos	Christiane Gagnon	325
Hochelaga	QC	Soraya Martinez Ferrada	Simon Marchand	328
Kitchener—Conestoga	ON	Tim Louis	Harold Albrecht	365
Miramichi—Grand Lake	NB	Pat Finnigan	Peggy McLean	370
Coquitlam—Port Coquitlam	BC	Ron McKinnon	Nicholas Insley	390
Cumberland—Colchester	NS	Lenore Zann	Scott Armstrong	453
Sherbrooke	QC	Élisabeth Brière	Pierre-Luc Dusseault	609

Across the nine close results where Liberals were elected, a shift of just over 1,600 votes combined in those ridings would have caused the Liberals to lose the seat.

20 most marginal seats (2019)
Rank	Riding		2015	2019			
Rank	Riding		2015	1st place	2nd place	Margin (pp)	Plurality
1	Port Moody—Coquitlam	BC	█ New Democratic	█ Conservative	█ New Democratic	0.3	153
2	Richmond Hill	ON	█ Liberal	█ Liberal	█ Conservative	0.4	212
3	Québec	QC	█ Liberal	█ Liberal	█ Bloc Québécois	0.6	325
4	Hochelaga	QC	█ New Democratic	█ Liberal	█ Bloc Québécois	0.6	328
5	Kitchener—Conestoga	ON	█ Conservative	█ Liberal	█ Conservative	0.7	365
6	Coquitlam—Port Coquitlam	BC	█ Liberal	█ Liberal	█ Conservative	0.7	390
7	Yukon	YK	█ Liberal	█ Liberal	█ Conservative	0.7	153
8	Cumberland—Colchester	NS	█ Liberal	█ Liberal	█ Conservative	1.0	453
9	Sherbrooke	QC	█ New Democratic	█ Liberal	█ New Democratic	1.0	609
10	Windsor—Tecumseh	ON	█ New Democratic	█ Liberal	█ New Democratic	1.1	629
11	Miramichi—Grand Lake	NB	█ Liberal	█ Liberal	█ Conservative	1.1	370
12	South Okanagan—West Kootenay	BC	█ New Democratic	█ New Democratic	█ Conservative	1.2	796
13	Châteauguay—Lacolle	QC	█ Liberal	█ Liberal	█ Bloc Québécois	1.2	639
14	Argenteuil—La Petite-Nation	QC	█ Liberal	█ Liberal	█ Bloc Québécois	1.5	729
15	Shefford	QC	█ Liberal	█ Bloc Québécois	█ Liberal	1.5	898
16	Gaspésie—Les Îles-de-la-Madeleine	QC	█ Liberal	█ Liberal	█ Bloc Québécois	1.7	637
17	King—Vaughan	ON	█ Liberal	█ Liberal	█ Conservative	1.8	1,141
18	Chicoutimi—Le Fjord	QC	█ Liberal	█ Conservative	█ Bloc Québécois	1.9	834
19	Aurora—Oak Ridges—Richmond Hill	ON	█ Liberal	█ Conservative	█ Liberal	2.0	1,060
20	Bay of Quinte	ON	█ Liberal	█ Liberal	█ Conservative	2.4	1,449

20 safest seats (2019)
Rank	Riding		2015	2019			
Rank	Riding		2015	1st place	2nd place	Margin (pp)	Plurality
1	Battle River—Crowfoot	AB	█ Conservative	█ Conservative	█ New Democratic	80.4	50,124
2	Bow River	AB	█ Conservative	█ Conservative	█ New Democratic	78.2	43,106
3	Lakeland	AB	█ Conservative	█ Conservative	█ New Democratic	77.4	44,586
4	Grande Prairie-Mackenzie	AB	█ Conservative	█ Conservative	█ New Democratic	77.0	46,953
5	Souris—Moose Mountain	SK	█ Conservative	█ Conservative	█ New Democratic	76.7	31,853
6	Foothills	AB	█ Conservative	█ Conservative	█ Liberal	76.3	50,016
7	Yellowhead	AB	█ Conservative	█ Conservative	█ New Democratic	75.2	42,066
8	Peace River—Westlock	AB	█ Conservative	█ Conservative	█ New Democratic	73.1	37,773
9	Red Deer—Mountain View	AB	█ Conservative	█ Conservative	█ New Democratic	73.1	49,819
10	Cypress Hills—Grasslands	SK	█ Conservative	█ Conservative	█ New Democratic	71.5	27,474
11	Red Deer—Lacombe	AB	█ Conservative	█ Conservative	█ New Democratic	70.9	47,831
12	Medicine Hat—Cardston—Warner	AB	█ Conservative	█ Conservative	█ New Democratic	70.4	37,406
13	Fort McMurray—Cold Lake	AB	█ Conservative	█ Conservative	█ Liberal	70.3	35,858
14	Sturgeon River—Parkland	AB	█ Conservative	█ Conservative	█ New Democratic	67.4	46,295
15	Battlefords—Lloydminster	SK	█ Conservative	█ Conservative	█ New Democratic	66.8	23,932
16	Carlton Trail—Eagle Creek	SK	█ Conservative	█ Conservative	█ New Democratic	66.2	29,778
17	Yorkton—Melville	SK	█ Conservative	█ Conservative	█ New Democratic	63.9	24,776
18	Calgary Shepard	AB	█ Conservative	█ Conservative	█ Liberal	63.9	49,970
19	Calgary Midnapore	AB	█ Conservative	█ Conservative	█ Liberal	63.2	43,052
20	Sherwood Park—Fort Saskatchewan	AB	█ Conservative	█ Conservative	█ New Democratic	61.2	44,733

== Significant results among independent and minor party candidates ==
Those candidates not belonging to a major party, receiving more than 1,000 votes in the election, are listed below:

Significant vote tallies for independent and minor party candidates
Riding		Candidate		Votes	Placed
Beauce	QC	█ Rhinoceros	Maxime Bernier	1,084	7th
Beauport—Côte-de-Beaupré—Île d’Orléans—Charlevoix	QC	█ Independent	Raymond Bernier	1,335	6th
Haldimand—Norfolk	ON	█ Veterans Coalition	Harold Stewart	1,083	6th
Markham—Stouffville	ON	█ Independent	Jane Philpott	13,216	3rd
Miramichi—Grand Lake	NB	█ Independent	Allison MacKenzie	1,160	6th
Niagara Falls	ON	█ Independent	Mike Strange	4,997	4th
Niagara West	ON	█ Christian Heritage	Harold Jonker	1,019	5th
Renfrew—Nipissing—Pembroke	ON	█ Independent	Dan Criger	1,125	6th
Saint John—Rothesay	NB	█ Independent	Stuart Jamieson	1,183	6th
Saint-Léonard—Saint-Michel	QC	█ Independent	Hassan Guillet	3,061	4th
Scarborough Centre	ON	█ Independent	John Cannis	2,524	4th
Skeena—Bulkley Valley	BC	█ Christian Heritage	Rod Taylor	1,343	5th
Sydney—Victoria	NS	█ Independent	Archie MacKinnon	5,679	4th
Vancouver Granville	BC	█ Independent	Jody Wilson-Raybould	16,357	1st
York—Simcoe	ON	█ Libertarian	Keith Komar	1,311	5th

== Ridings won in major cities ==
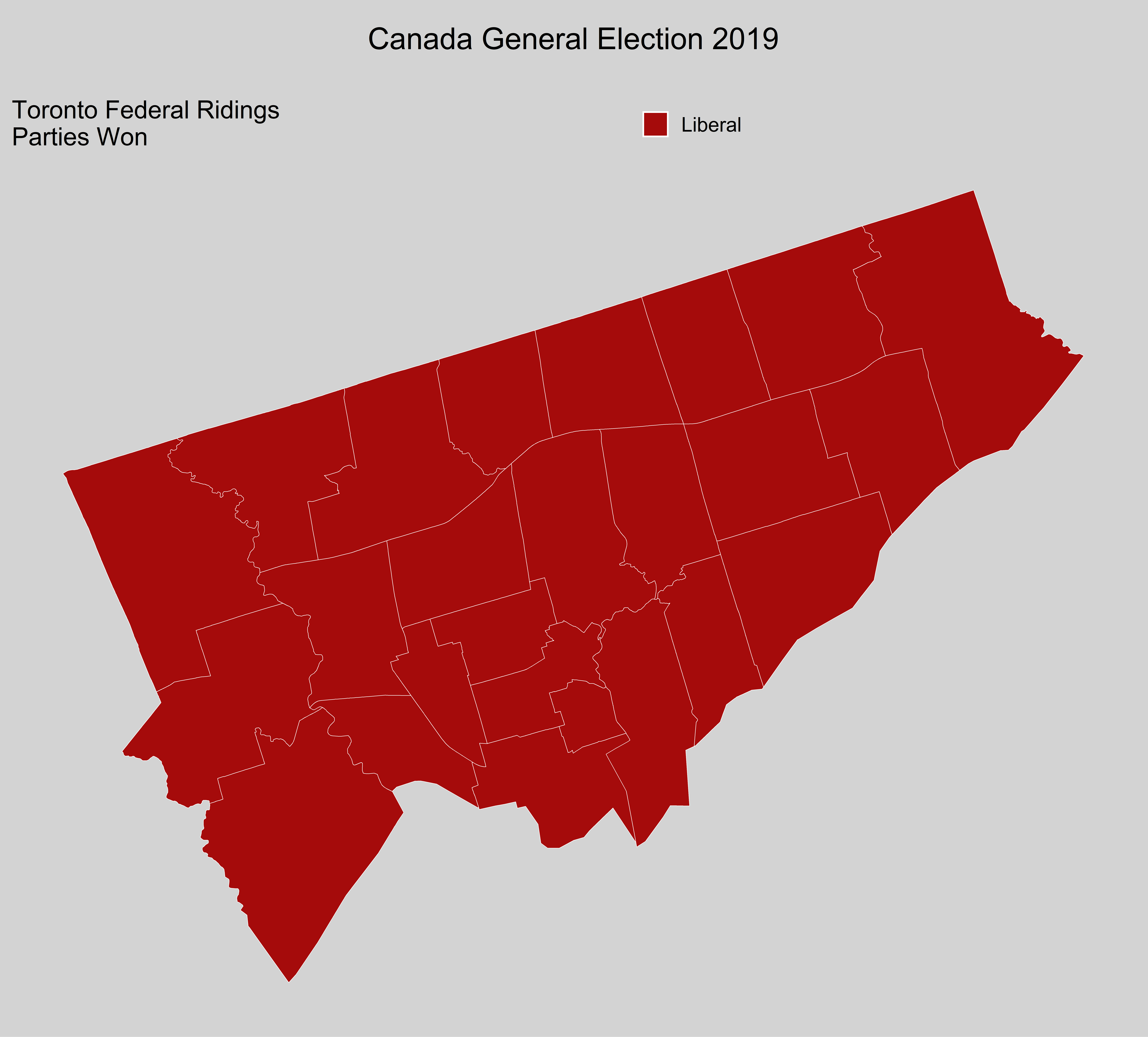
City of Toronto

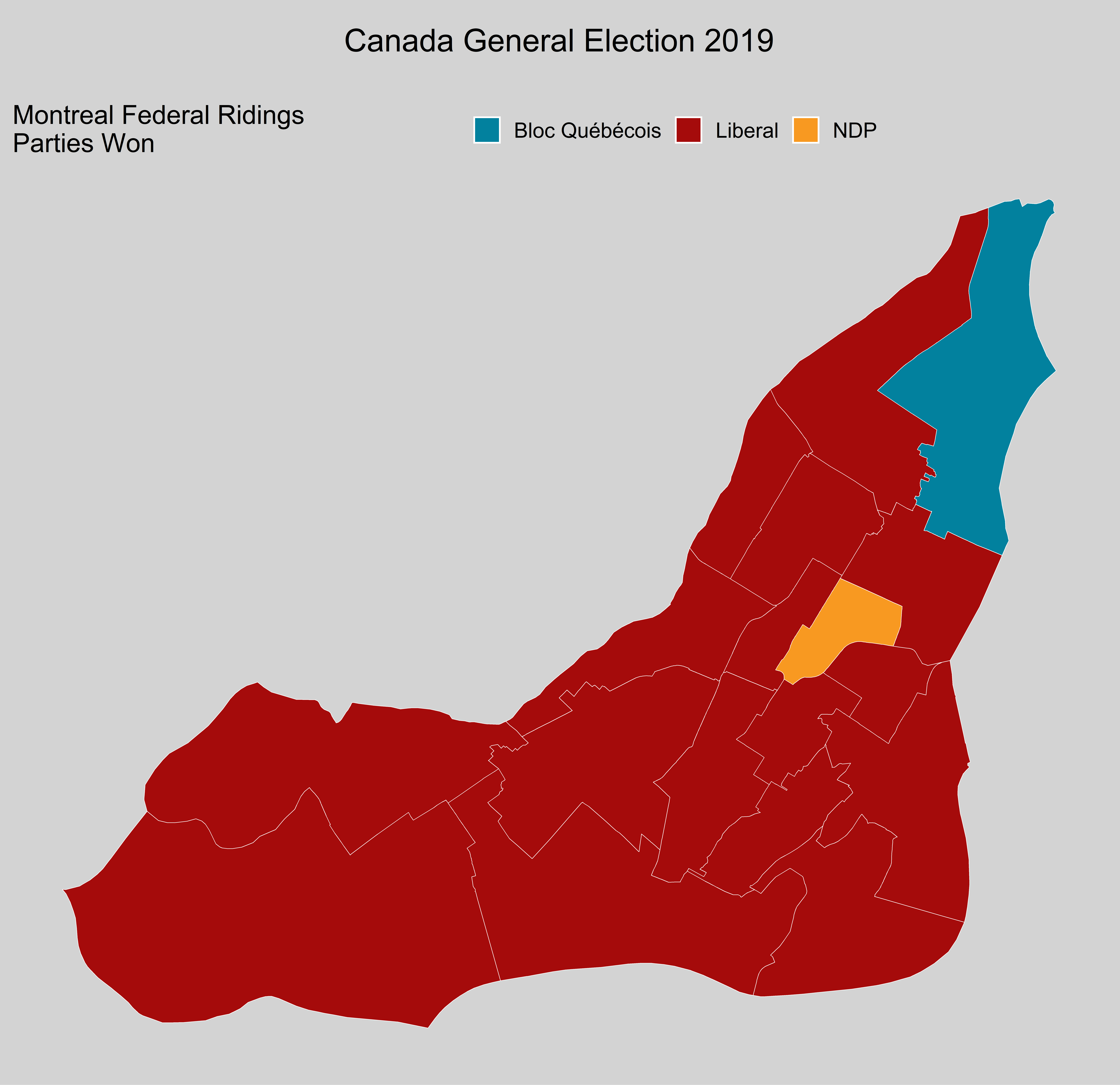
Montreal Island

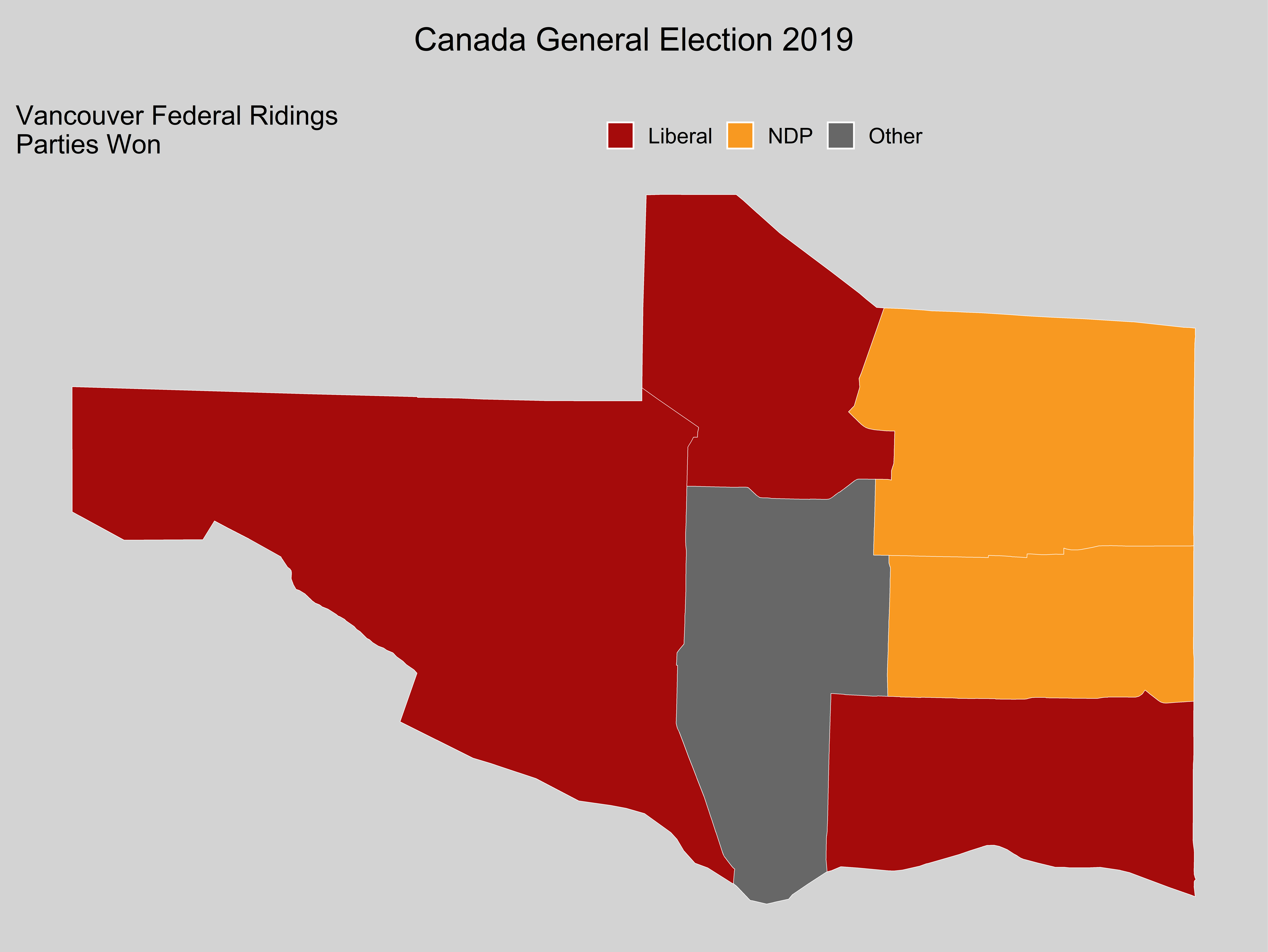
Vancouver

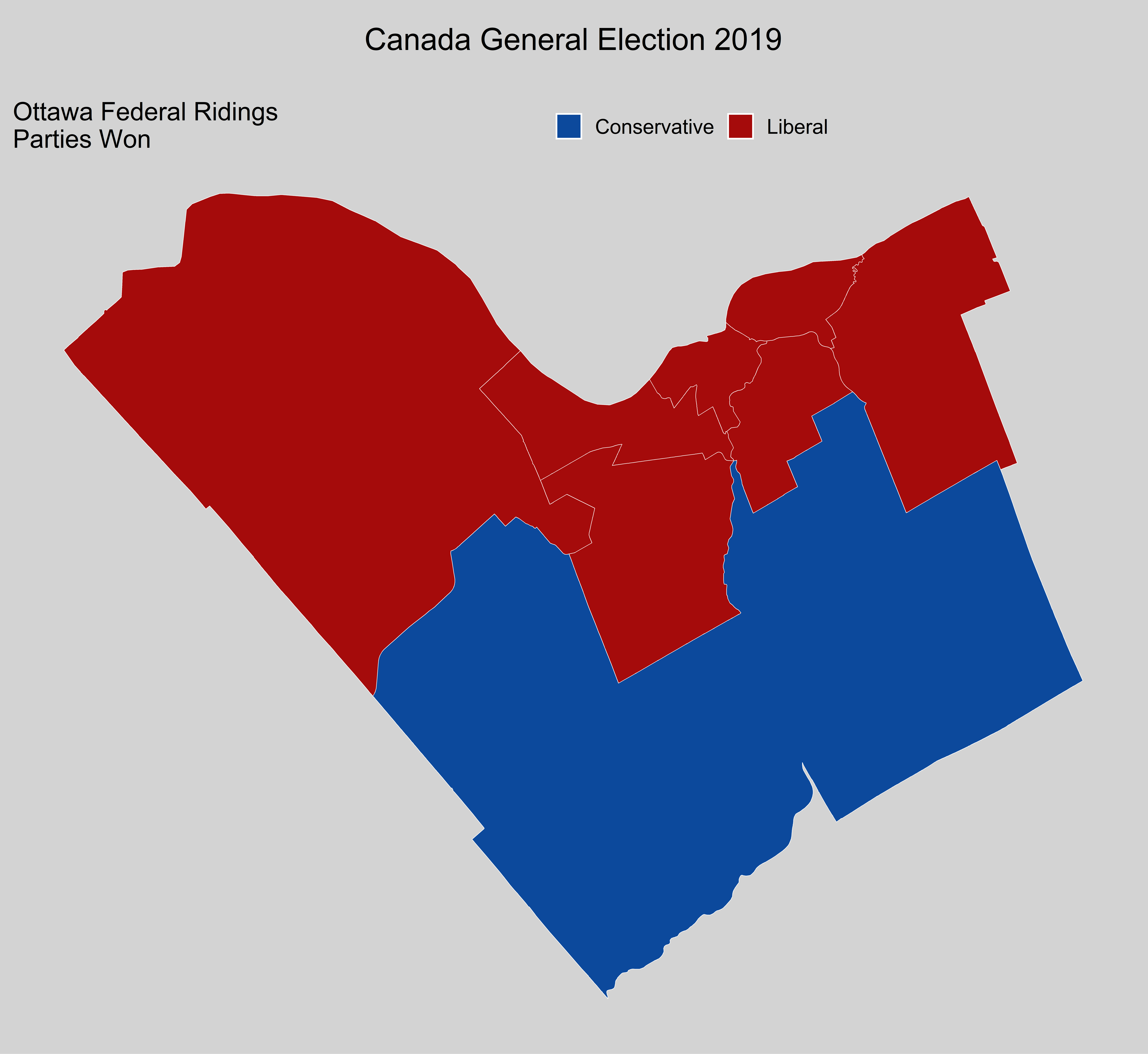
Ottawa

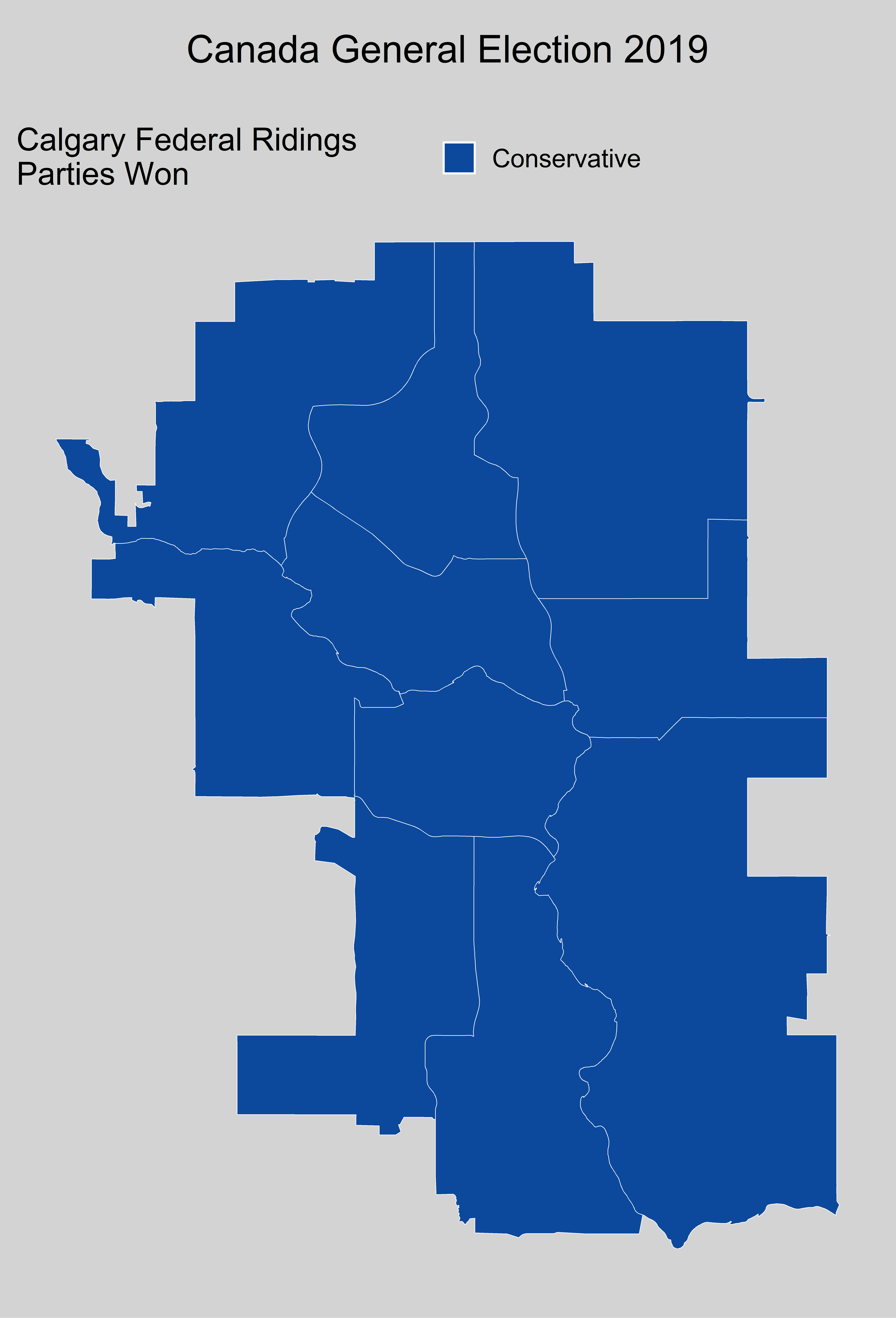
Calgary

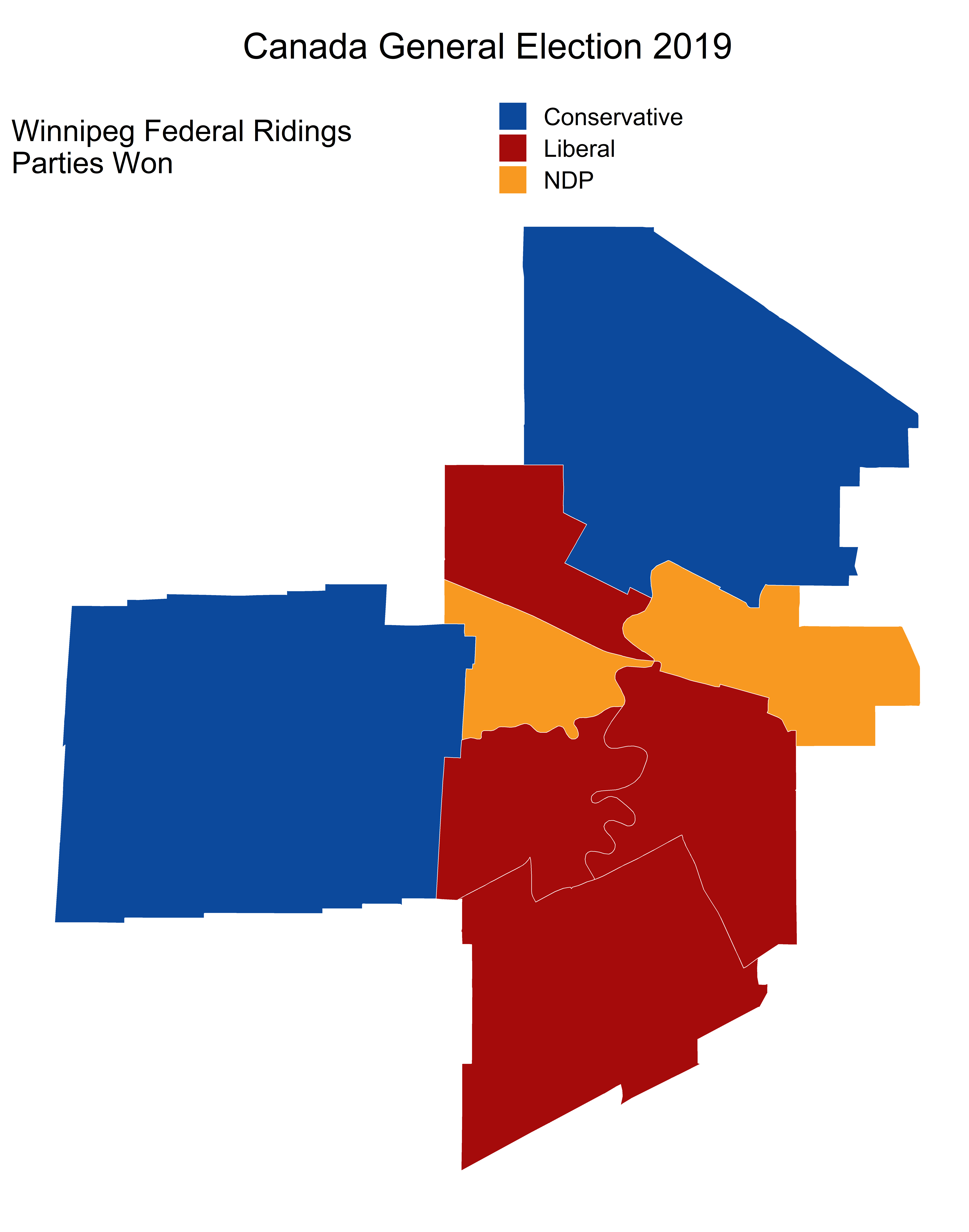
Winnipeg

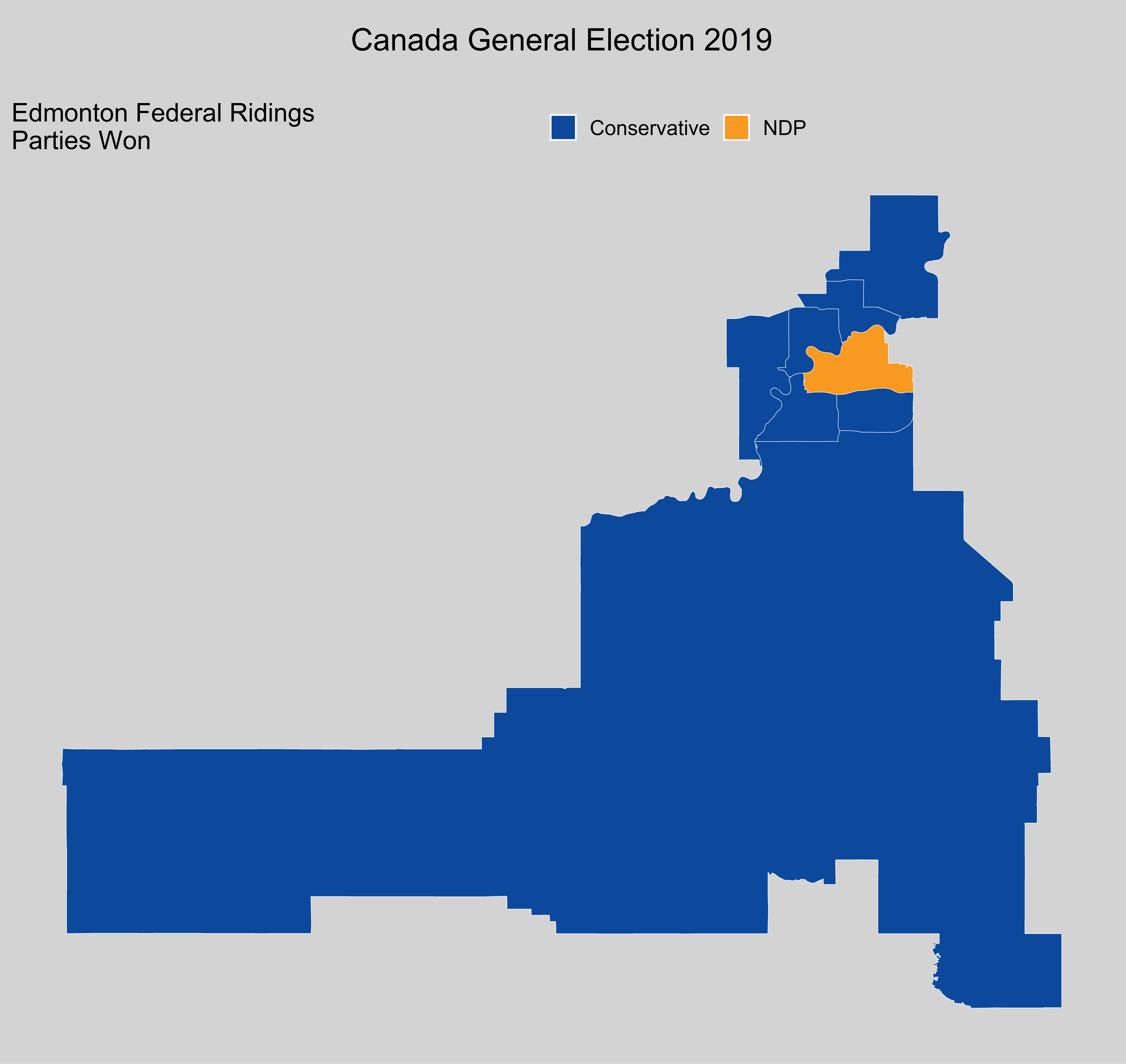
Edmonton (including Edmonton-Wetaskiwin, part of which is outside the City of Edmonton)
