= Mario Simard =

Canadian politician

Mario Simard MP

Member of Parliament for Jonquière
- Incumbent
- Assumed office October 21, 2019
- Preceded by: Karine Trudel

Personal details
- Party: Bloc Québécois

Mario Simard MP is a Canadian political science lecturer, press secretary and politician. He was elected to the House of Commons of Canada in the 2019 election from Jonquière in Quebec as a member of the Bloc Québécois. He defeated the incumbent NDP MP Karine Trudel.

== Political career ==
He served as the critic of intergovernmental affairs, natural resources and energy in the Bloc Québécois Shadow Cabinet of the 44th Parliament of Canada.

He was elected the vice chair of the Canadian House of Commons Standing Committee on Natural Resources in the 45th Canadian Parliament in 2025.

== Electoral record ==
2025 Canadian federal election: Jonquière
Party	Candidate	Votes	%	±%
Bloc Québécois	Mario Simard	20,247	39.99	-3.12
Conservative	Fanny Boulanger	15,314	30.25	+1.94
Liberal	William Van Tassel	13,172	26.02	+5.22
New Democratic	Lise Garon	932	1.84	-3.53
People's	Patrick Gaudreault	516	1.02	N/A
Green	Marie-Josée Yelle	448	0.88	-0.81
Total valid votes		50,629	98.41	
Total rejected ballots		817	1.59	-0.95
Turnout		51,446	67.98	+4.86
Eligible voters		75,676		
Bloc Québécois notional hold		Swing		-2.53
Source: Elections Canada
Note: number of eligible voters does not include voting day registrations.

2021 Canadian federal election: Jonquière
Party	Candidate	Votes	%	±%	Expenditures
Bloc Québécois	Mario Simard	19,036	41.9	+6.3	$21,445.47
Conservative	Louise Gravel	13,223	29.1	+8.2	$28,273.75
Liberal	Stéphane Bégin	9,546	21.0	+5.1	$15,443.09
New Democratic	Marieve Ruel	2,559	5.6	-19.0	$1,358.35
Green	Marie-Josée Yelle	738	1.6	-0.4	$0.00
Rhinoceros	Line Bélanger	372	0.8	N/A	$0.00
Total valid votes/expense limit		45,474	97.5	–	$127,988.39
Total rejected ballots		1,188	2.5		
Turnout		46,662	63.2		
Registered voters		73,830			
Bloc Québécois hold		Swing		-1.9	
Source: Elections Canada

2019 Canadian federal election: Jonquière
Party	Candidate	Votes	%	±%	Expenditures
Bloc Québécois	Mario Simard	17,577	35.6	+12.31	$11,695.16
New Democratic	Karine Trudel	12,141	24.6	-4.59	$58,005.08
Conservative	Philippe Gagnon	10,338	20.9	+4.01	$52,967.51
Liberal	Vincent Garneau	7,849	15.9	-12.58	$42,992.12
Green	Lyne Bourdages	1,009	2.0	+0.64	$0.00
People's	Sylvie Théodore	453	0.9		$1,360.01
Total valid votes/expense limit		49,367	100.0		
Total rejected ballots		999			
Turnout		50,366	69.3		
Eligible voters		72,713			
Bloc Québécois gain from New Democratic		Swing		+8.45	
Source: Elections Canada
