= Karine Trudel =

Canadian politician

Member of Parliament for Jonquière
- In office October 19, 2015 – October 21, 2019
- Preceded by: Claude Patry
- Succeeded by: Mario Simard

Personal details
- Party: New Democratic Party
- Profession: Letter carrier, politician

Karine Trudel is a Canadian politician who was elected as a Member of Parliament in the House of Commons of Canada to represent the federal riding of Jonquière during the 2015 Canadian federal election and served until her defeat in the 2019 Canadian federal election.

== Early life and education ==
Raised as a catholic, Trudel was baptized in the Catholic Church of Montreal Sainte-Thérèse-de-L'enfant-Jésus.

Prior to her political career, Trudel was a regional president for the Canadian Union of Postal Workers in Saguenay−Lac-Saint-Jean from 2007 to 2015. Speaking about her time as president, Trudel "loved [her] eight years as President." Trudel also worked as a letter carrier for Canada Post.

== Political career ==
Ms. Trudel cites Peter MacKay as her inspiration for running for federal politics. In a 2016 interview, Trudel spoke about hearing MacKay comment in 2014 "that the reason women were underrepresented on the Supreme Court was that they felt guilty about leaving the house because they had children to raise." With many years experience in balancing work and childcare responsibilities, Trudel was encouraged to run for government by Dany Morin, after she spoke to him about being infuriated by MacKay's comments.

== Personal life ==
Trudel is an ambassador for Arvida, created by the Committee for the Heritage Designation of Arvida (CORPA), which focuses on preserving the heritage of the city.

Trudel has two children.

== Electoral record ==
2019 Canadian federal election: Jonquière
Party	Candidate	Votes	%	±%	Expenditures
Bloc Québécois	Mario Simard	17,577	35.6	+12.31	$11,695.16
New Democratic	Karine Trudel	12,141	24.6	-4.59	$58,005.08
Conservative	Philippe Gagnon	10,338	20.9	+4.01	$52,967.51
Liberal	Vincent Garneau	7,849	15.9	-12.58	$42,992.12
Green	Lyne Bourdages	1,009	2.0	+0.64	$0.00
People's	Sylvie Théodore	453	0.9		$1,360.01
Total valid votes/expense limit		49,367	100.0		
Total rejected ballots		999			
Turnout		50,366	69.3		
Eligible voters		72,713			
Bloc Québécois gain from New Democratic		Swing		+8.45	
Source: Elections Canada

2015 Canadian federal election
Party	Candidate	Votes	%	±%	Expenditures
New Democratic	Karine Trudel	14,039	29.19	-13.31	–
Liberal	Marc Pettersen	13,700	28.48	+25.77	–
Bloc Québécois	Jean-François Caron	11,202	23.29	+4.03	–
Conservative	Ursula Larouche	8,124	16.89	-17.24	–
Green	Carmen Budilean	656	1.36	+0.07	–
Rhinoceros	Marielle Couture	382	0.79	–	–
Total valid votes/Expense limit		48,103	100.0		$243,988.74
Total rejected ballots		899	–	–	
Turnout		49,002	–	–	
Eligible voters		72,605			
New Democratic hold		Swing		-19.54	
Source: Elections Canada
