= 2023 Speaker of the House of Commons of Canada election =

- October 3, 2023
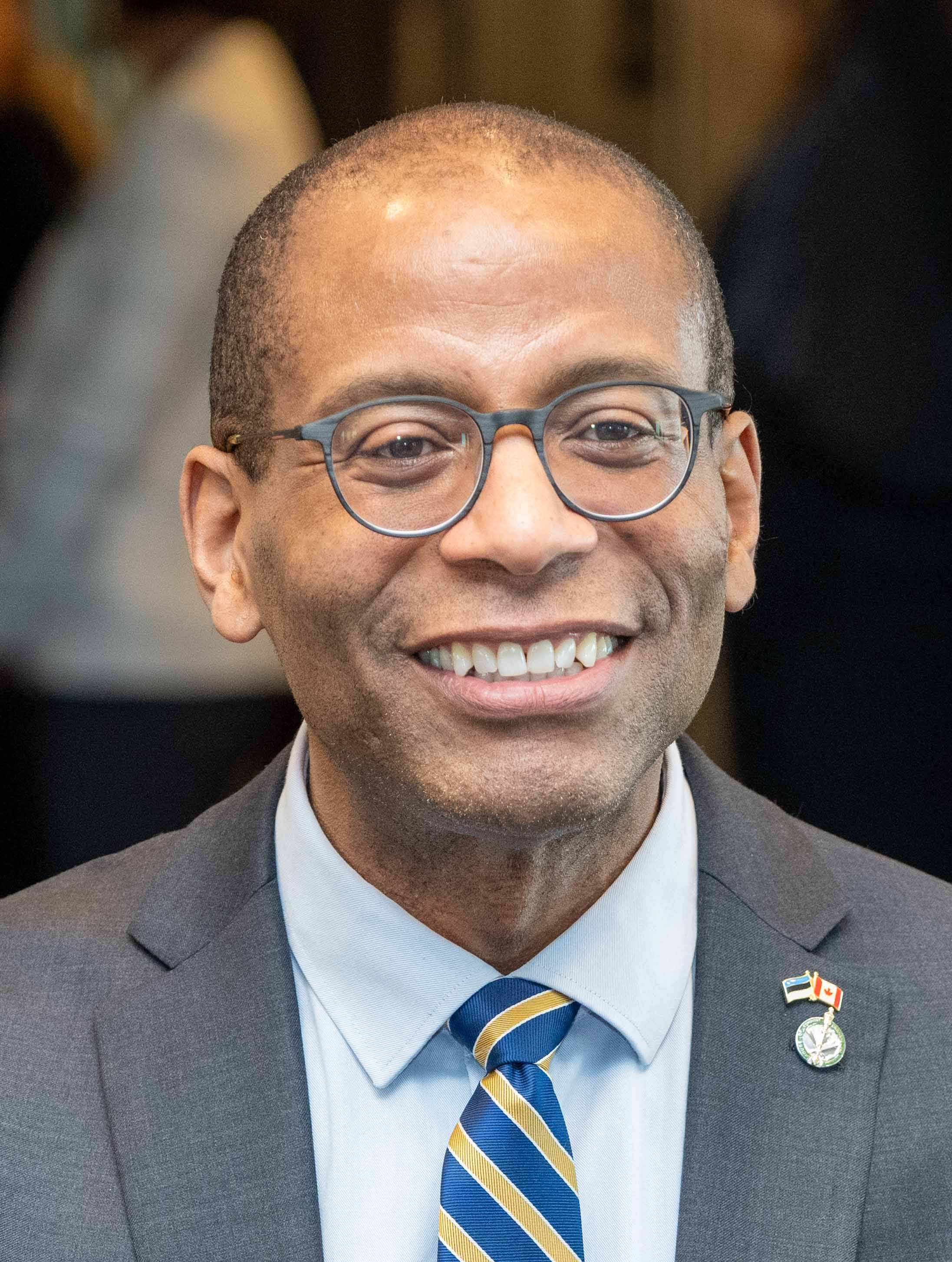

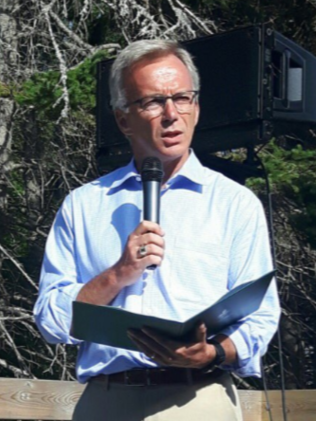

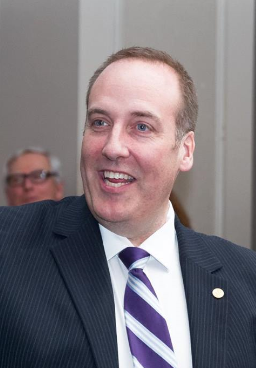

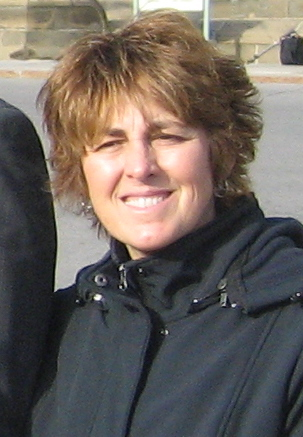

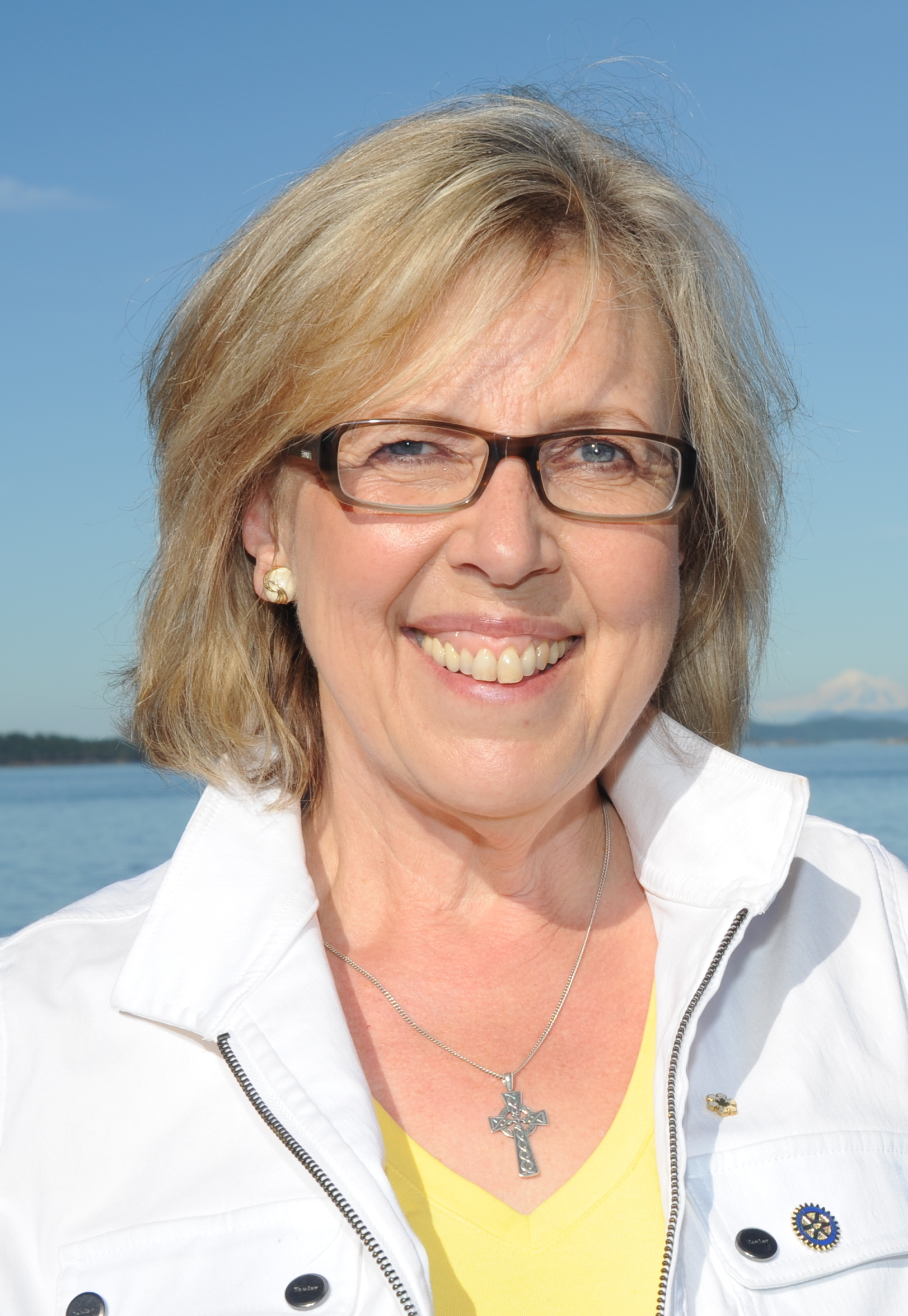

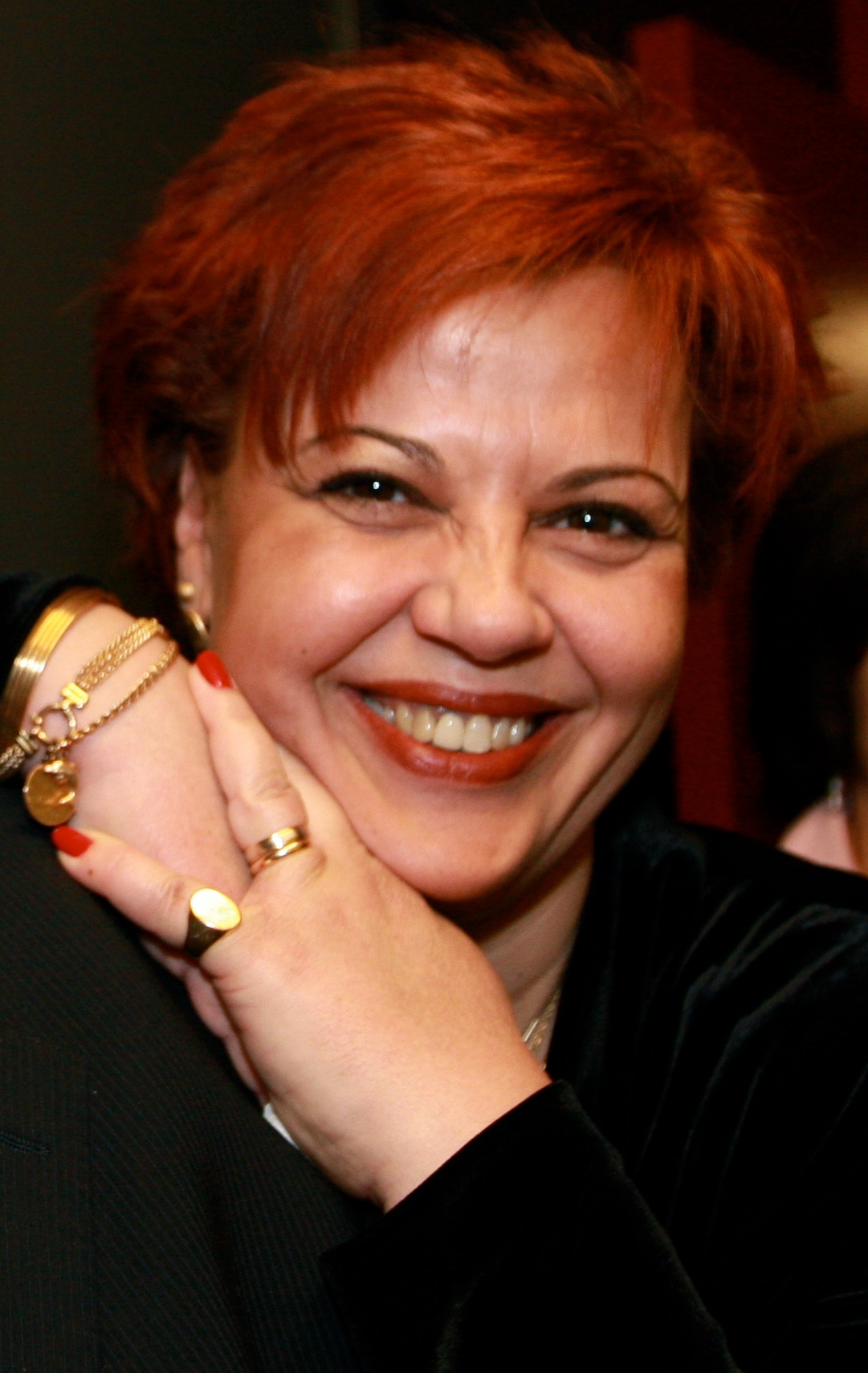

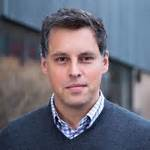
	Majority party	Minority party	Third party
Candidate	Greg Fergus	Sean Casey	Chris d'Entremont
Party	Liberal	Liberal	Conservative
Constituency	Hull—Aylmer	Charlottetown	West Nova
Result	Winner	Not elected	Not elected
	Fourth party	Fifth party	Sixth party
Candidate	Carol Hughes	Elizabeth May	Alexandra Mendès
Party	New Democratic	Green	Liberal
Constituency	Algoma—Manitoulin—Kapuskasing	Saanich—Gulf Islands	Brossard—Saint-Lambert
Result	Not elected	Not elected	Not elected
	Seventh party
Candidate	Peter Schiefke
Party	Liberal
Constituency	Vaudreuil—Soulanges
Result	Not elected
Speaker before election
Anthony Rota
Liberal
Elected Speaker
Greg Fergus
Liberal

The 2023 election for Speaker of the House of Commons of Canada took place on October 3, 2023, to elect the 38th speaker of the House of Commons, following the resignation of Speaker Anthony Rota. This was held during the 44th Canadian Parliament.

On September 22, 2023, Speaker Rota invited a former member of the Schutzstaffel, a Nazi paramilitary organization, to attend an address from Ukrainian president Volodymyr Zelenskyy, triggering his resignation as speaker. Yaroslav Hunka, who fought with the Waffen-SS during World War II was honoured by Rota and received a standing ovation from attendees. Rota apologized for the oversight and announced he would step down on September 26, resigning as speaker the following day.

Greg Fergus, the member of Parliament (MP) for Hull—Aylmer was elected speaker in the election. He is the first person of colour to be elected as speaker, and is the third speaker to be elected during a session of Parliament, joining Thomas Bain and Lloyd Francis.

== Background ==
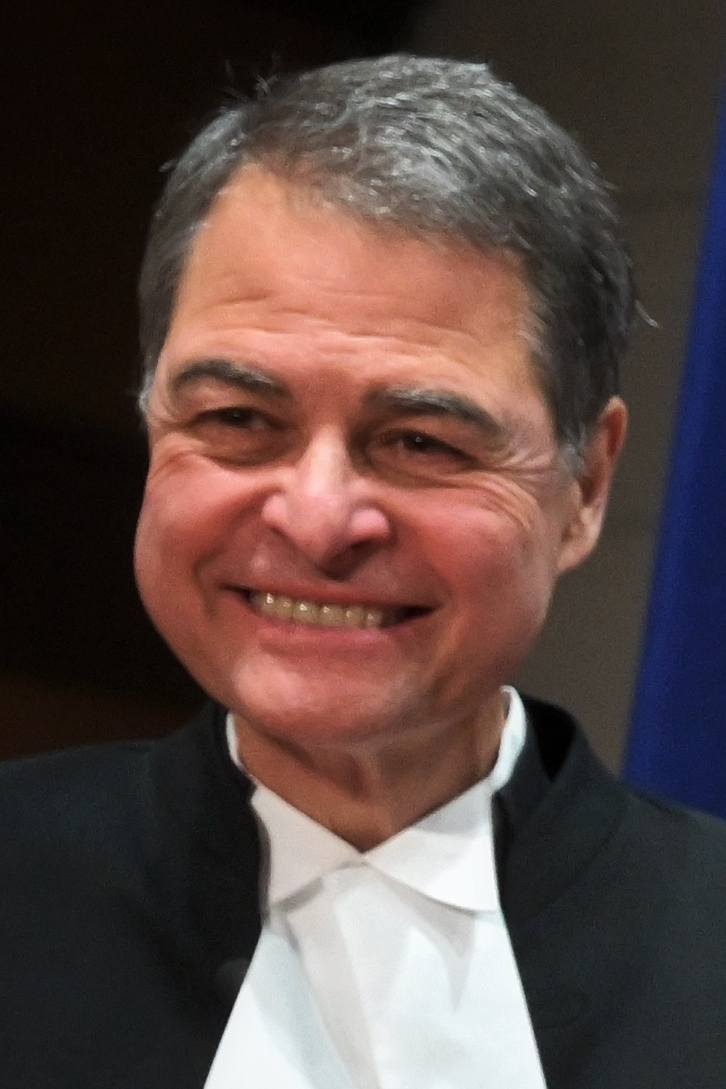
Former Speaker Anthony Rota.

Anthony Rota, the MP for Nipissing—Timiskaming, was elected as speaker of the House of Commons on December 5, 2019.

On September 22, 2023, following an address to the Canadian parliament by Ukrainian president Volodymyr Zelenskyy, Rota introduced and recognized Yaroslav Hunka in the parliamentary galleries. He identified Hunka as a "war hero" who fought for the First Ukrainian Division; subsequent media reports then identified Hunka as a member of the 14th Waffen Grenadier Division (also known as the 1st Galician Division) of Nazi Germany's Waffen-SS during the Second World War; the unit was responsible for anti-partisan atrocities in Poland, Slovakia and the Austria–Slovenia border. Rota apologized, and later resigned on September 26, 2023.

== Procedure ==
The speaker's election rules were introduced in 1986 and are set out in Chapter 7 of the House of Commons Procedure and Practice. All MPs except for ministers of the Crown and party leaders are eligible to run for speaker. Any MP who does not wish to put their name forward must issue a letter withdrawing from the ballot by the day before the vote. All MPs who do not remove their name from the ballot as of 6:00 pm ET the day before the election are listed as candidates on the ballot. As this election will occur during a session, the presiding officer during the election would typically be the outgoing speaker or, in the absence of the speaker, the deputy speaker; the election was presided over by the dean of the House, Louis Plamondon, who was serving as interim speaker. If only one candidate existed, a motion would've been laid before the House to ask if the candidate should take the Chair as Speaker. If the question were challenged, the decision would've been put to a division.

Candidates for election each gave a five-minute speech to the House before voting. The House then voted by secret ballot, using the ranked ballot voting system. Each MP ranked each candidate by preference, and an absolute majority was required. If no candidate won a majority, the individual with the fewest votes was eliminated, as were any candidates who received less than 5 percent of the votes cast until one member received a majority vote.

== Election ==
The following MPs confirmed their intention to run to in the media:

=== Elected speaker ===
- Greg Fergus (Liberal, Hull—Aylmer)

=== Candidates ===
- Sean Casey (Liberal, Charlottetown)
- Chris d'Entremont (Conservative, West Nova; Deputy Speaker and Chair of the Committees of the Whole)
- Carol Hughes (New Democratic, Algoma—Manitoulin—Kapuskasing; Assistant Deputy Speaker and Deputy Chair of the Committees of the Whole)
- Elizabeth May (Green, Saanich—Gulf Islands)
- Alexandra Mendès (Liberal, Brossard—Saint-Lambert; Assistant Deputy Speaker and Assistant Deputy Chair of the Committees of the Whole)
- Peter Schiefke (Liberal), (Vaudreuil—Soulanges)

==== Withdrawn ====
- Stéphane Lauzon (Liberal), (Argenteuil—La Petite-Nation)
