= 2023 Speaker election =

2023 Speaker election may refer to:

- 2023 Speaker of the Canadian House of Commons election
- January 2023 Speaker of the United States House of Representatives election
- October 2023 Speaker of the United States House of Representatives election
