= Speaker of the House of Commons (Canada) =

Presiding officer of the House of Commons

- Président de la Chambre des communes
- Badge and baton of office of the Speaker

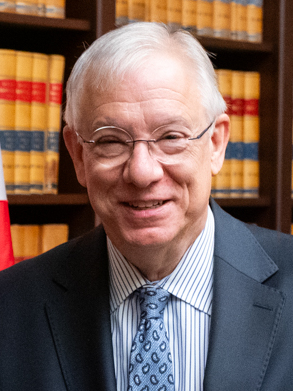
- Incumbent; Francis Scarpaleggia since May 26, 2025
- House of Commons of Canada
- Style: The Honourable (while in office); Mr. Speaker (in the House)
- Member of: Parliament
- Residence: The Farm
- Appointer: Elected by the members of the House of Commons
- Term length: Elected at the start of each Parliament
- Inaugural holder: James Cockburn
- Salary: CA$321,300 (2026)
- Website: www.ourcommons.ca/speaker

The speaker of the House of Commons (French: président de la Chambre des communes) is the presiding officer of the lower house of the Parliament of Canada. A member of Parliament (MP), a speaker is elected at the beginning of each new parliament by fellow MPs. The speaker's role in presiding over the House of Commons of Canada is similar to that of speakers elsewhere in other countries that use the Westminster system.

The 40th speaker of the House of Commons is Francis Scarpaleggia, who assumed the role on May 26, 2025. The speaker with the longest tenure is Peter Milliken who was elected for four consecutive terms lasting 10 years, 124 days.

== Role ==
In Canada it is the speaker's responsibility to manage the House of Commons and supervise its staff. It is also the speaker's duty to act as a liaison with the Senate and the Crown. They are to rule over the house and have the government answer questions during the question period as well as keep decorum with the house. The speaker receives a salary of CA$309,700 ($209,800 as an MP in addition to $99,900 as speaker) and has use of a small apartment, in the House of Commons, and an official residence, The Farm, an estate at Kingsmere in Gatineau Park, Quebec, across the river from Ottawa.

Along with the Senate speaker, the speaker of the House is responsible for the Parliamentary Protective Service, which provides security to Parliament Hill with the Royal Canadian Mounted Police (RCMP).

The term "speaker" originates from the British parliamentary tradition. The French term now used in Canada is président (president, chairperson, or presiding officer); the term orateur, a calque (literal translation) of "speaker" and formerly the term used in France for the Speaker of the House of Commons of the United Kingdom, was used until the early 1980s.

The speaker and their deputies preside over debates of the House of Commons, invite particular members to speak, maintain order and decorum (including reproving members who misbehave), and make rulings on points of order and points of privilege. By parliamentary rule and tradition, all statements in the House are addressed to the speaker, never to another member. For example, one does not say, "Prime Minister, will you explain to this House...", or "Thank you for the question." Instead, one would say, "Mr. Speaker, will the Prime Minister explain to this House..." or "Madam Speaker, I thank the honourable member for her question." Members are not allowed to speak while the speaker is speaking, and must sit down when the speaker rises to speak.

By convention, speakers are normally addressed in Parliament as "Mr. Speaker" (monsieur le président) for a man, and "Madam Speaker" (madame la présidente) for a woman; the speaker has also been addressed using the Inuktitut term ᐅᖃᖅᑎᑦᑎᔨ (Uqaqtittiji). Deputies of the speaker who are presiding at a given time are also addressed as "Mr./Madam Speaker."

== Election ==
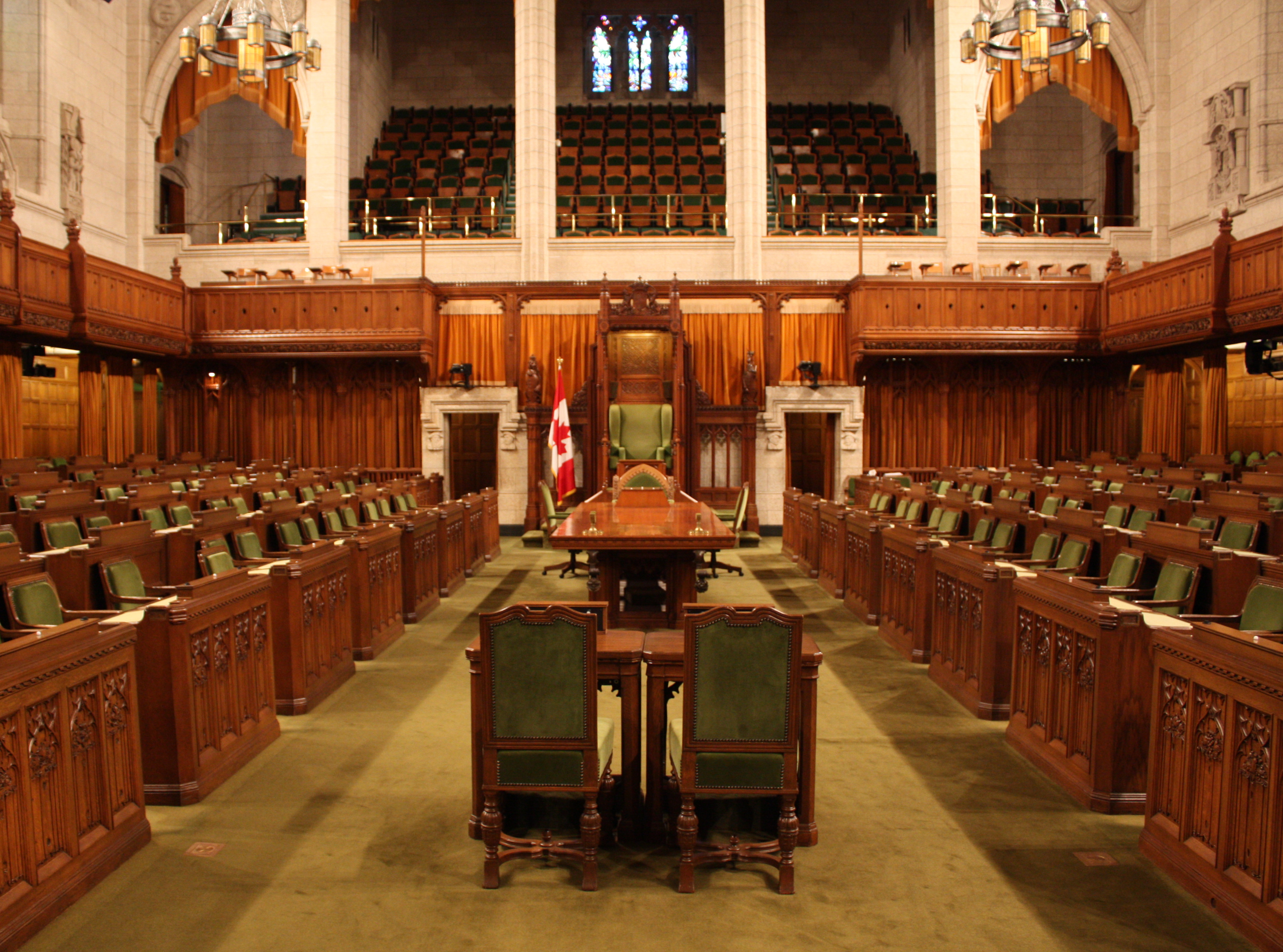
The chamber of the House of Commons; the Speaker's chair is front and centre in the room.

Plaque at the western entrance of the Centre Block of Parliament Hill

Although the Constitution requires that the speaker be elected by the House of Commons, traditionally this amounted to the rubber-stamp approval of an MP nominated by the prime minister. However, in 1986 this was changed and they are now selected by secret ballot. The speaker remains a sitting MP, but only votes on matters in the case of a tie.

All MPs except for Cabinet ministers and party leaders are eligible to run for speaker. Any MP who does not wish to put their name forward must issue a letter withdrawing from the ballot by the day before the vote. All MPs who do not remove their name from the ballot as of 6:00 p.m. the day before the election are listed as candidates on the ballot and are allowed a five-minute speech to persuade their colleagues as to why they should be elected.

The dean of the House supervises the election of the speaker. The current dean is Louis Plamondon, who is also the longest continuously serving MP who is not in Cabinet.

All candidates who receive less than 5 per cent of the vote are removed from the ballot. If no candidate received less than 5% of the vote then the MP with the fewest vote drops off. This continues, with a one-hour break between ballots, until one candidate receives more than 50 per cent of the vote. In the event of a tie on the final ballot, the ballot is taken again. This happened once, in 1993, when Gilbert Parent won over Jean-Robert Gauthier.

The winner is escorted to the speaker's chair by the prime minister and leader of the Official Opposition. The newly elected speaker, by tradition, feigns reluctance as they are "dragged" to the chair in a practice corresponding to the unsubstantiated legend that British speakers risked execution if the news they reported to the king was displeasing.

On June 2, 2011, Conservative Andrew Scheer (Regina—Qu'Appelle) was elected speaker, defeating the following MPs over the course of six ballots: New Democrat Denise Savoie (Victoria) and Conservatives Dean Allison (Niagara West—Glanbrook), Barry Devolin (Haliburton—Kawartha Lakes—Brock), Ed Holder (London West), Lee Richardson (Calgary Centre), Bruce Stanton (Simcoe North), and Merv Tweed (Brandon—Souris). At the age of 32 years, 13 days, Scheer was the youngest Speaker in Canadian history.

On December 2, 2015, Liberal Geoff Regan was elected speaker by members of the 42nd Parliament over fellow Liberal candidates Denis Paradis, Yasmin Ratansi and Conservative Bruce Stanton. He was the first speaker from Atlantic Canada or Nova Scotia in nearly a hundred years since Edgar Nelson Rhodes in 1922.

Anthony Rota was elected as 37th speaker on December 5, 2019, by winning a ranked ballot between himself, Joël Godin, Carol Hughes, Geoff Regan (the speaker during the previous Parliament), and Bruce Stanton. Following Rota's win, the Conservatives said that he had them to thank for his new election, after they decided in a Conservative caucus meeting to unseat Regan as a show of strength to the Liberal minority government that had obtained from the election that October 21. They did so by ranking Regan lower on the ranked ballot.

=== Opposition speakers ===
The speaker usually comes from among MPs of the governing party. But because they cannot vote unless their vote would break a tie and by convention must vote to maintain the status quo (which includes voting confidence in the government), a minority government can slightly weaken the opposition's power by electing an opposition speaker.

Speakers have been elected from opposition parties during the 1926 tenure of Arthur Meighen's Conservative ministry, the 1979 ministry of Progressive Conservative Joe Clark, and Stephen Harper's Conservative Ministry from 2006 to 2011. In the 39th Parliament, opposition members Peter Milliken, Diane Marleau, and Marcel Proulx ran for speaker. In 1957, when John Diefenbaker took power with a minority Progressive Conservative government, he offered the speaker's chair to Stanley Knowles of the opposition Co-operative Commonwealth Federation (the precursor to the New Democratic Party, or NDP) who declined. So far, every speaker from an opposition party has been a Liberal. Louis Plamondon, who served as interim speaker from September 28 to October 3, 2023, following the resignation of Anthony Rota, was a member of the Bloc Québécois.

== Impartiality ==
The speaker is required to perform their office impartially, but does not resign from their party membership upon taking office, as is done in the United Kingdom. Speaker Lucien Lamoureux, the 27th holder, decided to follow the custom of the speaker of the British House of Commons and ran in the 1968 election as an independent. Both the Liberal Party and the Progressive Conservative Party agreed not to run candidates against him. The New Democratic Party, however, declined to withdraw their candidate. Lamoureux was re-elected and continued to serve as speaker. However, in the 1972 election, the opposition parties did not come to an agreement and ran candidates against him. Lamoureux was again returned but no subsequent speakers have repeated his attempt to run as an independent. The opposition parties may have chosen not to follow the 1968 precedent because of how close the election was: it produced a Liberal minority government with just two more seats than the Conservatives.

== Tie-breaking votes ==
On May 19, 2005, Speaker Peter Milliken was required to cast the tie-breaking vote during a confidence measure for the first time in Canadian history. Faced with the defeat of Paul Martin's minority government, Milliken voted in favour of the NDP budget amendment. Despite popular belief that the speaker, as a Liberal MP, would automatically support the government, his vote was pre-determined by other factors. As speaker, Milliken's vote must be cast to allow the continuation of debate, or to maintain the status quo, a reflection of Speaker Denison's rule practiced in the British House of Commons. Thus, the speaker voted in favour of second reading, "to allow the House time for further debate so that it can make its own decision at some future time." The bill would later pass third reading without the need for Milliken's vote.

Speakers have only needed to vote in order to break a tie 12 times in Canadian parliamentary history. Milliken did so on five occasions, almost as many as all previous speakers combined.

== Deputy speaker ==
In addition to the speaker, a deputy speaker, also known as the Chair of Committees (of the whole), is elected at the beginning of each parliament to act in place of the speaker when the latter is unavailable. Under the Standing Orders, the speaker, after consulting with each of the party leaders, nominates a candidate for deputy speaker to the House, which then votes on that nomination. The deputy speaker presides over daily sessions of the House when the speaker is not in the chair. The deputy speaker also chairs the House when it sits as a Committee of the Whole. Other presiding officers, the deputy chair of committees and the assistant deputy chair of committees, are chosen each session to occupy the chair when the speaker and deputy speaker are not available. The deputy speaker and the other presiding officers are members of the Panel of Chairs, and can therefore be selected by the speaker to chair legislative committees. Like the speaker, the deputy speaker has a role in administering the House.

The deputy speaker of the 45th Canadian Parliament (current) is Tom Kmiec (Conservative).

The Chair of Committees is vested by Subsection 43(1) of the Parliament of Canada Act with full and adequate authority to address matters in the titular Speaker's absence: "Whenever the House of Commons is informed of the unavoidable absence of the Speaker thereof by the Clerk at the table, the Chairman of Committees, if present, shall take the chair and perform the duties and exercise the authority of Speaker in relation to all the proceedings of the House, as Deputy Speaker."

== Retirement ==
Most former speakers retire from Parliament after their tenure as speaker, sometimes after returning to the backbench for a period. Several have been appointed to diplomatic positions, summoned to the Senate, or appointed to a vice-regal position such as lieutenant-governor of a province or, in two cases, governor general of Canada (Roland Michener and Jeanne Sauvé). While several former Cabinet ministers have served as speaker or stood for the position, no former speakers have subsequently been appointed to Cabinet.

One former Speaker, Andrew Scheer, has gone on to assume a front bench position in the House of Commons: Scheer became leader of the Conservative Party of Canada in 2017 and served as Leader of the Opposition from 2017 to 2020. Scheer later returned to the position of Opposition leader starting in 2025 when the Conservatives' de jure leader, Pierre Poilievre, was left without a seat in the House of Commons.

== Interim speaker ==
The resignation of Speaker Anthony Rota on September 27, 2023, led to an unprecedented situation in which there was no Speaker while the House had several sitting days already planned. To give time for the election of a new Speaker to be organized, the House agreed by unanimous consent on September 26 to name Louis Plamondon of the Bloc Québécois as interim Speaker until the election. He was chosen as interim speaker by virtue of his status as Dean of the House, the longest-serving MP who is not a cabinet member or party leader; the Dean of the House is in any event in charge of presiding over the election of a Speaker at the beginning of a new Parliament.

== Honorary Speaker ==
On March 9, 2016, Liberal MP Mauril Bélanger served as honorary speaker for about an hour to honour his years of service. Speaker Regan resumed his duties for the remainder of the sitting of the House.

Bélanger had initially been considered a front runner to be speaker in the previous year, but had withdrawn due to his being diagnosed with amyotrophic lateral sclerosis. Bélanger died on August 15, 2016, five months after being named honorary speaker.

== Counterparts ==
The speaker's counterpart in the upper house is the speaker of the Senate of Canada. Canadian provincial and territorial legislatures also have speakers with much the same roles. The position was preceded by the speaker of the Legislative Assembly of the Province of Canada.

== Symbols of Office ==
=== Baton ===
The speaker is entitled to use a baton to represent the authority of their office. The baton was created as a heraldic emblem for the Honourable John Allen Fraser, the 32nd Speaker of the House, in 1992. In the same year, Fraser had the baton made as a physical object to commemorate the 125th anniversary of Canadian Confederation.

The baton is made of green maple-wood, as green is the traditional colour of the House of Commons, and the maple tree a symbol of Canada. The baton is topped with a lion which embodies Parliament resting its paw on a maple coronet embellished with 12 red jewels, which represent the number of provinces and territories at the time. The dovetailing on the baton's tips represent the neck bands worn by the speaker, as well as battlements protecting the country. On the underside of the bottom tip, Fraser's shield of arms is engraved and surrounded by the phrase Pro Regina Et Patriae; For Queen and Country.

== List of speakers of the House of Commons ==
Key:

Liberal Party of Canada
Historical conservative parties: Liberal-Conservative, Conservative, Unionist, National Liberal and Conservative, Progressive Conservative
Conservative Party of Canada
Bloc Québécois

No.	Portrait	Name Electoral district (Birth–Death)	Term of office		Term length	Party	Parliament
No.	Portrait	Name Electoral district (Birth–Death)	Term start	Term end	Term length	Party	Parliament
1		James Cockburn; MP for Northumberland West (1818–1883)	November 6, 1867	March 25, 1874	6 years, 99 days	Conservative	1st
1		James Cockburn; MP for Northumberland West (1818–1883)	November 6, 1867	March 25, 1874	6 years, 99 days	Conservative	2nd
2		Timothy Anglin; MP for Gloucester (1822–1896)	March 26, 1874	February 12, 1879	4 years, 323 days	Liberal	3rd
3		Joseph-Goderic Blanchet; MP for Lévis (1829–1890)	February 13, 1879	February 7, 1883	3 years, 359 days	Liberal-Conservative	4th
4		George Airey Kirkpatrick; MP for Frontenac (1841–1899)	February 8, 1883	July 12, 1887	4 years, 154 days	Conservative	5th
4		George Airey Kirkpatrick; MP for Frontenac (1841–1899)	February 8, 1883	July 12, 1887	4 years, 154 days	Conservative	6th
5		Joseph-Aldric Ouimet; MP for Laval (1848–1916)	July 13, 1887	July 28, 1891	4 years, 15 days	Liberal-Conservative	6th
5		Joseph-Aldric Ouimet; MP for Laval (1848–1916)	July 13, 1887	July 28, 1891	4 years, 15 days	Liberal-Conservative	7th
6		Peter White; MP for Renfrew North (1838–1906)	July 29, 1891	August 18, 1896	5 years, 21 days	Conservative	7th
7		James David Edgar; MP for Ontario West (1841–1899)	August 19, 1896	July 31, 1899	2 years, 346 days	Liberal	8th
8		Thomas Bain; MP for Wentworth South (1834–1915)	August 1, 1899	February 5, 1901	1 year, 188 days	Liberal	8th
9		Louis-Philippe Brodeur; MP for Rouville (1862–1924)	February 6, 1901	January 18, 1904	2 years, 346 days	Liberal	9th
10		Napoléon Belcourt; MP for Ottawa (City of) (1860–1932)	March 10, 1904	January 10, 1905	306 days	Liberal	9th
11		Robert Franklin Sutherland; MP for Essex North (1859–1922)	January 11, 1905	January 19, 1909	4 years, 8 days	Liberal	10th
12		Charles Marcil; MP for Bonaventure (1860–1937)	January 20, 1909	November 14, 1911	2 years, 298 days	Liberal	11th
13		Thomas Simpson Sproule; MP for Grey East (1843–1917)	November 15, 1911	December 2, 1915	4 years, 17 days	Conservative	12th
14		Albert Sévigny; MP for Dorchester (1881–1961)	January 12, 1916	January 7, 1917	361 days	Conservative	12th
15		Edgar Nelson Rhodes; MP for Cumberland (1877–1942)	January 18, 1917	March 5, 1922	5 years, 46 days	Conservative	12th
15		Edgar Nelson Rhodes; MP for Cumberland (1877–1942)	January 18, 1917	March 5, 1922	5 years, 46 days	Conservative	13th
16		Rodolphe Lemieux; MP for Gaspé (1866–1937)	March 8, 1922	June 2, 1930	8 years, 86 days	Liberal	14th
16		Rodolphe Lemieux; MP for Gaspé (1866–1937)	March 8, 1922	June 2, 1930	8 years, 86 days	Liberal	15th
16		Rodolphe Lemieux; MP for Gaspé (1866–1937)	March 8, 1922	June 2, 1930	8 years, 86 days	Liberal	16th
17		George Black; MP for Yukon (1873–1965)	September 8, 1930	January 16, 1935	4 years, 130 days	Conservative	17th
18		James Langstaff Bowman; MP for Dauphin (1879–1951)	January 17, 1935	February 5, 1936	1 year, 19 days	Conservative	17th
19		Pierre-François Casgrain; MP for Charlevoix—Saguenay (1886–1950)	February 6, 1936	May 10, 1940	4 years, 94 days	Liberal	18th
20		James Allison Glen; MP for Marquette (1877–1950)	May 16, 1940	September 5, 1945	5 years, 112 days	Liberal	19th
21		Gaspard Fauteux; MP for St. Mary (1898–1963)	September 6, 1945	September 14, 1949	4 years, 69 days	Liberal	20th
22		William Ross Macdonald; MP for Brantford (1891–1976)	September 15, 1949	June 11, 1953	3 years, 269 days	Liberal	21st
23		Louis-René Beaudoin; MP for Vaudreuil—Soulanges (1912–1970)	November 12, 1953	October 13, 1957	3 years, 335 days	Liberal	22nd
24		Roland Michener; MP for St. Paul's (1900–1991)	October 14, 1957	September 26, 1962	4 years, 347 days	Progressive Conservative	23rd
24		Roland Michener; MP for St. Paul's (1900–1991)	October 14, 1957	September 26, 1962	4 years, 347 days	Progressive Conservative	24th
25		Marcel Lambert; MP for Edmonton West (1919–2000)	September 27, 1962	May 15, 1963	230 days	Progressive Conservative	25th
26		Alan Macnaughton; MP for Mount Royal (1903–1999)	May 16, 1963	January 17, 1966	2 years, 246 days	Liberal	26th
27		Lucien Lamoureux; MP for Stormont—Dundas (1920–1998)	January 18, 1966	September 29, 1974	8 years, 253 days	Liberal	27th
27		Lucien Lamoureux; MP for Stormont—Dundas (1920–1998)	January 18, 1966	September 29, 1974	8 years, 253 days	Independent	28th
27		Lucien Lamoureux; MP for Stormont—Dundas (1920–1998)	January 18, 1966	September 29, 1974	8 years, 253 days	Independent	29th
28		James Jerome; MP for Sudbury (1933–2005)	September 30, 1974	December 14, 1979	5 years, 75 days	Liberal	30th
28		James Jerome; MP for Sudbury (1933–2005)	September 30, 1974	December 14, 1979	5 years, 75 days	Liberal	31st
29		Jeanne Sauvé; MP for Laval-des-Rapides (1922–1993)	April 14, 1980	January 15, 1984	3 years, 276 days	Liberal	32nd
30		Lloyd Francis; MP for Ottawa West (1920–2007)	January 16, 1984	November 4, 1984	293 days	Liberal	32nd
31		John Bosley; MP for Don Valley West (1947–2022)	November 5, 1984	September 29, 1986	1 year, 328 days	Progressive Conservative	33rd
32		John Allen Fraser; MP for Vancouver South (1931–2024)	September 30, 1986	January 16, 1994	7 years, 108 days	Progressive Conservative	33rd
32		John Allen Fraser; MP for Vancouver South (1931–2024)	September 30, 1986	January 16, 1994	7 years, 108 days	Progressive Conservative	34th
33		Gilbert Parent; MP for Welland—St. Catharines—Thorold (until 1997); MP for Niagara Centre (from 1997) (1935–2009)	January 17, 1994	January 28, 2001	7 years, 11 days	Liberal	35th
33		Gilbert Parent; MP for Welland—St. Catharines—Thorold (until 1997); MP for Niagara Centre (from 1997) (1935–2009)	January 17, 1994	January 28, 2001	7 years, 11 days	Liberal	36th
34		Peter Milliken; MP for Kingston and the Islands (born 1946)	January 29, 2001	June 2, 2011	10 years, 124 days	Liberal	37th
34		Peter Milliken; MP for Kingston and the Islands (born 1946)	January 29, 2001	June 2, 2011	10 years, 124 days	Liberal	38th
34		Peter Milliken; MP for Kingston and the Islands (born 1946)	January 29, 2001	June 2, 2011	10 years, 124 days	Liberal	39th
34		Peter Milliken; MP for Kingston and the Islands (born 1946)	January 29, 2001	June 2, 2011	10 years, 124 days	Liberal	40th
35		Andrew Scheer; MP for Regina—Qu'Appelle (born 1979)	June 2, 2011	December 2, 2015	4 years, 183 days	Conservative	41st
36		Geoff Regan; MP for Halifax West (born 1959)	December 3, 2015	December 5, 2019	4 years, 2 days	Liberal	42nd
37		Anthony Rota; MP for Nipissing—Timiskaming (born 1961)	December 5, 2019	September 27, 2023	3 years, 296 days	Liberal	43rd
37		Anthony Rota; MP for Nipissing—Timiskaming (born 1961)	December 5, 2019	September 27, 2023	3 years, 296 days	Liberal	44th
38 (Note: Plamondon, the dean of the House, was selected by unanimous motion to serve as speaker in an interim capacity after Rota's unprecedented resignation in the middle of the parliamentary session following the Yaroslav Hunka scandal. Plamondon's short tenure allowed parliamentary business to continue until another speaker was elected.)		Louis Plamondon; MP for Bécancour—Nicolet—Saurel (born 1943)	September 27, 2023	October 3, 2023	6 days	Bloc Québécois	44th
39		Greg Fergus; MP for Hull—Aylmer (born 1969)	October 3, 2023	May 26, 2025	1 year, 235 days	Liberal	44th
40		Francis Scarpaleggia; MP for Lac-Saint-Louis (born 1957)	May 26, 2025	Incumbent	1 year, 176 days	Liberal	45th
