= Jean-Louis Leduc =

Canadian politician

Jean-Louis Leduc (7 March 1918 – 22 August 1993) was a Liberal party member of the House of Commons of Canada. He was born in Sainte-Victoire-de-Sorel, Quebec and became a professor and businessman by career.

He represented Quebec's Richelieu electoral district since winning that seat in the 1979 federal election. He was re-elected in the 1980 election, but left national politics after his defeat to Louis Plamondon of the Progressive Conservative party in the 1984 federal election.
