= Greg Fergus =

Canadian politician (born 1969)

The Honourable Greg Fergus PC MP
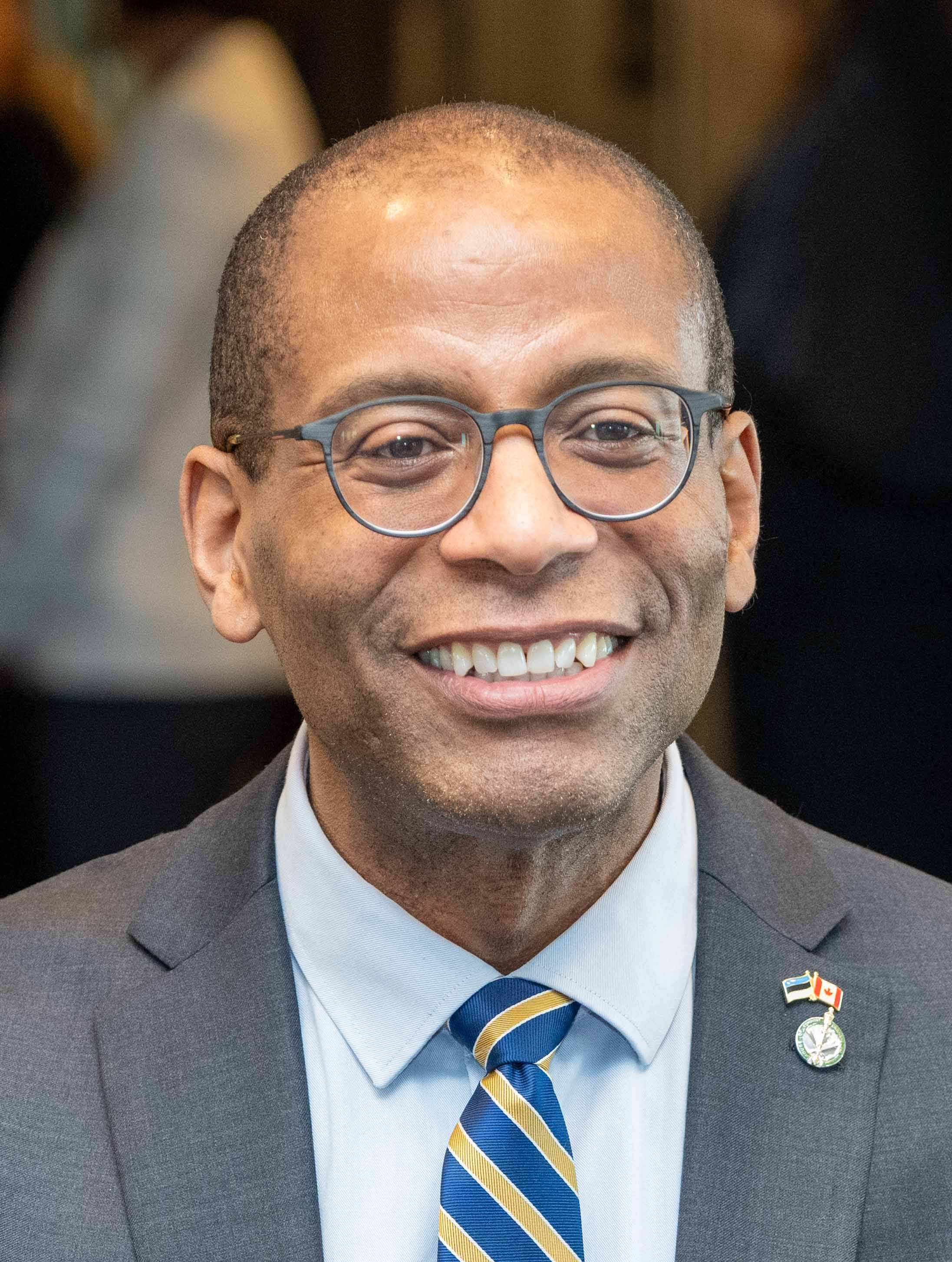
- Fergus in 2024

39th Speaker of the House of Commons
- In office October 3, 2023 – May 26, 2025
- Preceded by: Louis Plamondon
- Succeeded by: Francis Scarpaleggia

Member of Parliament for Hull—Aylmer
- Incumbent
- Assumed office October 19, 2015
- Preceded by: Nycole Turmel
Other offices held
Parliamentary Secretary to the Minister of Health
In office September 18, 2023 – October 3, 2023
Minister	Mark Holland
Preceded by	Adam van Koeverden
Parliamentary Secretary to the President of the Treasury Board
In office May 3, 2019 – October 3, 2023
Minister	Joyce Murray; Jean-Yves Duclos; Mona Fortier; Anita Anand
Preceded by	Joyce Murray
Parliamentary Secretary to the Prime Minister of Canada
In office March 19, 2021 – September 18, 2023
Prime Minister	Justin Trudeau
Preceded by	Omar Alghabra
Succeeded by	Terry Duguid
Parliamentary Secretary to the Minister of Innovation, Science and Industry
In office December 2, 2015 – January 27, 2017
Minister	Navdeep Bains
Preceded by	Mike Lake
Succeeded by	David Lametti

Personal details
- Born: Gregory Cristophe Fergus; May 31, 1969 (age 57) Montreal, Quebec, Canada
- Party: Liberal
- Spouse: Julie Cool
- Education: Selwyn House School
- Alma mater: Marianopolis College (DEC); University of Ottawa (BSocSc); Carleton University (BA)

Gregory Christophe Fergus PC MP (born May 31, 1969) is a Canadian politician who served as the 39th speaker of the House of Commons from October 3, 2023 to May 26, 2025. He is the member of Parliament (MP) for Hull—Aylmer.

A member of the Liberal Party, Fergus was first elected in the 2015 federal election and has held a number of portfolios as a parliamentary secretary. Before his election to Parliament, Fergus worked as a political staffer.

== Early life and education ==
Fergus' paternal grandfather immigrated to Canada from the British colony of Montserrat. His mother is from Jamaica.

Greg Fergus studied at public English elementary schools, Westpark and Sunnydale, and later attended Lindsay Place High School. After a teachers’ strike affected his schooling, his parents decided to send him to Selwyn House School, a private boys’ school, followed by Marianopolis College, and he later earned two bachelor's degrees, one from the University of Ottawa and the other in international relations from Carleton University. At Selwyn House, which he attended from Grade 9 to 11, he was classmates with entrepreneurs Vincenzo Guzzo, Mark Pathy and Michael Penner, who later served as chairman of Hydro-Québec.

Fergus was president of the Young Liberals of Canada from 1994 to 1996, where he attracted attention for supporting the passage of a motion calling on the Liberal Party to support same-sex marriage. After attending university and earning bachelor's degrees in social science and international relations, he worked for Liberal cabinet ministers Pierre Pettigrew and Jim Peterson. In 2007, Stéphane Dion named him the national director of the Liberal Party.

== Political career ==
In the 2015 federal election, Fergus was nominated as the Liberal candidate in Hull—Aylmer, a traditionally Liberal riding that had fallen to the New Democratic Party in the previous election. The contest was attended by some controversy, as NDP incumbent Nycole Turmel accused Fergus' campaign of spreading rumours that she was terminally ill, which Fergus denied. Fergus won the election by over 11,000 votes in a race that was expected to be close by the New Democratic Party and Liberals.

From March 19, 2021 to September 17, 2023 Fergus Served as Parliamentary Secretary to Justin Trudeau. While in this role he was sworn into the privy council in order to allow him access to cabinet documents.

On October 3, 2023, Fergus was elected as the 38th speaker of the House of Commons, becoming the first Black house speaker. On May 28, 2024, Fergus survived a vote to remove him as speaker of the House of Commons (168 to 142). The Liberals, Greens, and New Democrats voted against removing him, while the Bloc Quebecois and Conservatives voted in favour of removing him.

In May 2025, he ran for re-election for Speaker of the Commons but lost to fellow Liberal MP Francis Scarpaleggia.

== Controversies ==
In February 2023, Fergus was found to have violated the Conflict of Interest Act by writing a letter of support for a television channel's application to the CRTC for mandatory carriage.

In December 2023, Fergus appeared in a video tribute to outgoing interim party leader John Fraser which was played at the Ontario Liberal Party leadership convention, dressed as Speaker of the House of Commons. Conservative Party of Canada and Bloc Québécois MPs called on Fergus to resign for breaching the Speaker's impartiality.

The matter was studied by the Canadian House of Commons Standing Committee on Procedure and House Affairs. On December 14, 2023 Committee Chair Bardish Chagger presented a report supported by Liberal and NDP MPs calling on Fergus to "undertake the appropriate steps to reimburse a suitable amount for the use of parliamentary resources" and " issue another apology clearly stating that filming the video both in his office, and in his robes was inappropriate". Conservative and Bloc Québécois MPs each issued dissenting reports calling on Fergus to resign.

On April 30, 2024, Fergus ordered the official opposition leader, Pierre Poilievre, to leave the House of Commons for calling the Prime Minister a "wacko", and for insinuating that his policies had led to the deaths of thousands of Canadians. The entirety of the Conservative Party followed him. This marked the first time in history that an opposition leader had been instructed to leave the House.

In May 2024, Conservative MP Chris Warkentin wrote a letter criticizing Fergus over language used in an advertisement promoting an event which Warkentin argued was partisan and inflammatory. Warkentin further claimed that these comments rendered Fergus unsuitable for the role of Speaker.

== Electoral record ==
2025 Canadian federal election: Hull—Aylmer
Party	Candidate	Votes	%	±%	Expenditures
Liberal	Greg Fergus	31,978	62.11	+9.65	$38,557.74
Conservative	Jill Declare	8,727	16.95	+6.17	$7,992.90
Bloc Québécois	Alice Grondin	6,248	12.14	–3.97	$3,392.39
New Democratic	Pascale Matecki	2,855	5.55	–7.19	$17,999.40
Green	Frédéric Morin-Paquette	1,130	2.19	–0.63	$12,149.25
People's	Jean-Jacques Desgranges	341	0.66	–2.99	$2,031.47
Marxist–Leninist	Alexandre Deschênes	208	0.40	N/A	$0.00
Total valid votes		51,487	99.01	+0.31	$124,638.00
Total rejected ballots		515	0.99	–0.31	
Turnout		52,002	69.39	+3.28	
Eligible voters		74,942			
Liberal notional hold		Swing		+1.74	
Source: Elections Canada

2021 Canadian federal election: Hull—Aylmer
Party	Candidate	Votes	%	±%	Expenditures
Liberal	Greg Fergus	26,892	52.5	−1.6	$63,261.55
Bloc Québécois	Simon Provost	8,323	16.2	+1.6	$12,271.08
New Democratic	Samuel Gendron	6,483	12.7	−0.9	$1,357.33
Conservative	Sandrine Perion	5,507	10.7	+1.6	$12,393.59
People's	Eric Fleury	1,864	3.6	+2.4	$2,637.53
Green	Simon Gnocchini-Messier	1,459	2.8	−4.2	$9,342.81
Free	Josée Lafleur	375	0.7	N/A	$4,513.90
Rhinoceros	Mike LeBlanc	203	0.4	±0.0	$0.00
Independent	Catherine Dickins	143	0.3	N/A	$0.00
Total valid votes/expense limit		51,249	98.7	–	$109,916.55
Total rejected ballots		666	1.3		
Turnout		51,915	66.5		
Registered voters		78,032			
Liberal hold		Swing		−1.6	
Source: Elections Canada

2019 Canadian federal election: Hull—Aylmer
Party	Candidate	Votes	%	±%	Expenditures
Liberal	Greg Fergus	29,732	54.1	+2.73	none listed
Bloc Québécois	Joanie Riopel	8,011	14.6	+8.06	$2,949.94
New Democratic	Nicolas Thibodeau	7,467	13.6	−17.92	$26,504.52
Conservative	Mike Duggan	4,979	9.1	+1.38	$18,923.80
Green	Josée Poirier Defoy	3,869	7.0	+5.13	$9,958.48
People's	Rowen Tanguay	638	1.2	–	$638.31
Rhinoceros	Sébastien Grenier	195	0.4	–	$0.00
Marxist–Leninist	Alexandre Deschênes	102	0.2	+0.02	$0.00
Total valid votes/expense limit		54,993	100.0		
Total rejected ballots		692			
Turnout		55,685	70.4		
Eligible voters		79,072			
Liberal hold		Swing		−2.67	
Source: Elections Canada

2015 Canadian federal election: Hull—Aylmer
Party	Candidate	Votes	%	±%	Expenditures
Liberal	Greg Fergus	28,478	51.37	+30.88	$77,403.19
New Democratic	Nycole Turmel	17,472	31.52	−27.26	$73,823.88
Conservative	Étienne Boulrice	4,278	7.72	−2.33	$3,208.51
Bloc Québécois	Maude Chouinard-Boucher	3,625	6.54	−2.14	$5,830.63
Green	Roger Fleury	1,035	1.87	−0.14	$6,523.33
Christian Heritage	Sean J. Mulligan	291	0.52	–	$5,299.81
Independent	Luc Desjardins	160	0.3	–	–
Marxist–Leninist	Gabriel Girard	101	0.18	–	–
Total valid votes/Expense limit		55,440	100.0		$213,352.22
Total rejected ballots		391	–	–	
Turnout		55,831	70.8%	–	
Eligible voters		78,773			
Liberal gain from New Democratic		Swing		28.92%	
Source: Elections Canada
