= The Farm (residence) =

Residence of the Speaker of the House of Commons

The Farm La Ferme (French)
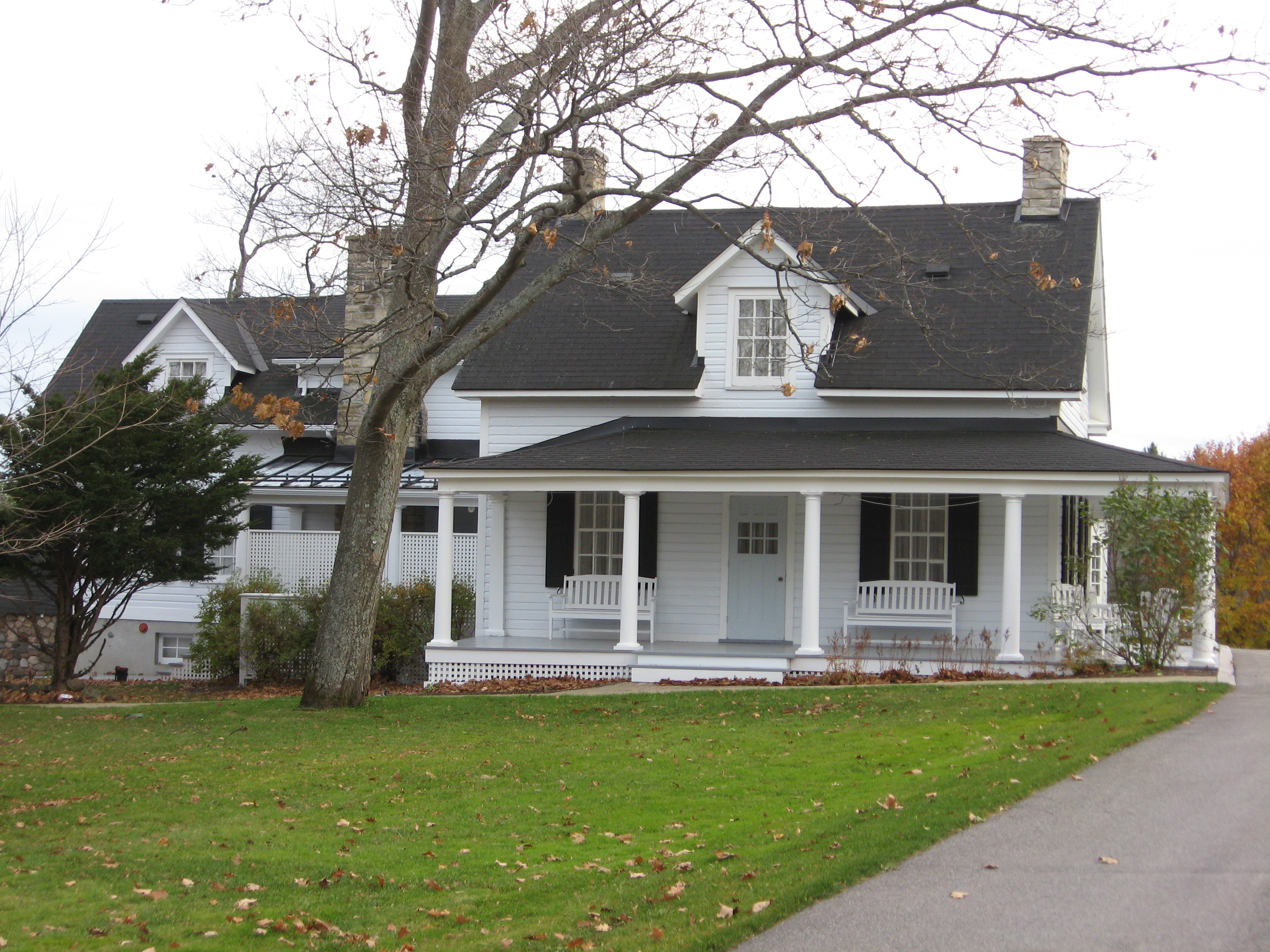
- The Farm in autumn 2007
- Interactive map of the The Farm; La Ferme (French) area

General information
- Type: Official residence
- Location: Kingsmere, Quebec, Canada
- Coordinates: 45°29′6″N 75°50′28″W
- Current tenants: Francis Scarpaleggia, Speaker of the House of Commons and his family
- Owner: The King in Right of Canada
- Landlord: National Capital Commission

Technical details
- Floor area: 5,000 square feet (460 m^{2})
- Grounds: 1.74 hectares (4.3 acres)

Website
- ncc-ccn.gc.ca/places/the-farm

The Farm (French: La Ferme) is a historic farmhouse and the official residence of the speaker of the House of Commons of Canada. It is located in Gatineau Park in the community of Kingsmere, Quebec, Canada, near the country's capital, Ottawa. The Farm has been managed and maintained by the National Capital Commission since 1986. In addition to the Farm, the Speaker of the House of Commons is also provided a two-room apartment in Centre Block on Parliament Hill. The residence and its 1.74 hectares (4.3 acres) of grounds are not open to the public.

== History ==
The residence was originally part of a farmstead built by settler Henry Fleury in the mid-19th century. William Lyon Mackenzie King, the 10th prime minister of Canada, privately purchased the farmstead in 1927 to incorporate it into his country estate at Kingsmere Lake. King had the house renovated in 1935 to serve as a summer home, building two new wings as well as adding heating and indoor plumbing systems.

Upon his retirement from politics, King spent more time at the Farm, and it was where he died on July 22, 1950. In his will he bequeathed his entire country estate "to the government and people of Canada" and expressed a desire for the residence to be used by future prime ministers. The grounds of the Mackenzie King Estate were later absorbed into Gatineau Park, however 24 Sussex Drive had already been designated the official residence of the prime minister, so the Farm was instead designated as the residence for the Speaker of the House of Commons in 1955. The state of the residence is described as "poor" according to the NCC.
