= Bécancour—Nicolet—Saurel—Alnôbak =

Federal electoral district in Quebec, Canada

Quebec electoral district
- Interactive map of riding boundaries (previously named Bécancour—Nicolet—Saurel) from the 2015 federal election
- Coordinates: 46.219°N 72.433°W

Federal electoral district
- Legislature: House of Commons
MP
Louis Plamondon
Bloc Québécois
- District created: 1968
- First contested: 1968
- Last contested: 2021
- District webpage: profile, map

Demographics
- Population (2016): 94,588
- Electors (2019): 79,165
- Area (km²): 2,749.31
- Pop. density (per km²): 34.4
- Census division(s): Bécancour, Nicolet-Yamaska, Pierre-De Saurel
- Census subdivision(s): Sorel-Tracy, Bécancour, Nicolet, Sainte-Anne-de-Sorel, Saint-Roch-de-Richelieu, Saint-Léonard-d'Aston, Sainte-Victoire-de-Sorel, Pierreville, Saint-François-du-Lac, Saint-Robert

Bécancour—Nicolet—Saurel—Alnôbak (French pronunciation: [bekɑ̃kuʁ nikɔlɛ(t) sɔʁɛl alnobak]; formerly Bécancour—Nicolet—Saurel) is a federal electoral district in Quebec, Canada, that has been represented in the House of Commons of Canada since 1968.

== Geography ==
The riding, along the south shore of the Saint Lawrence River opposite the city of Trois-Rivières, straddles the Quebec regions of Centre-du-Québec and Montérégie.

The riding consists of:

- the Regional County Municipality of Pierre-De Saurel (formerly Le Bas-Richelieu)
- the Regional County Municipality of Nicolet-Yamaska, including Odanak Indian reserve No. 12; and
- the Regional County Municipality of Bécancour, including Wôlinak Indian reserve No. 11.

The neighbouring ridings are Mégantic—L'Érable—Lotbinière, Richmond—Arthabaska—des-Sources, Drummond, Saint-Hyacinthe—Bagot—Acton, Pierre-Boucher—Les Patriotes—Verchères, Berthier—Maskinongé, Trois-Rivières, Saint-Maurice—Champlain, and Saint-Augustin—Portneuf—Jacques-Cartier.

== Demographics ==
According to the 2021 Canadian census

Ethnic groups: 96.2% White, 2.1% Indigenous

Languages: 96.8% French, 1.0% English

Religions: 75.9% Christian (70.3% Catholic, 5.6% Other), 23.6% None

Median income: $38,000 (2020)

Average income: $45,320 (2020)

== Riding associations ==
Riding associations are the local branches of political parties:

Party	Association name	CEO	HQ City
Conservative	Association du Parti conservateur Bécancour—Nicolet—Saurel-Alnôbak	Denis Croteau	Nicolet
Liberal	Association libérale fédérale de Bécancour--Nicolet--Saurel--Alnôbak	Hayat Razak	Lévis
New Democratic	Association NPD Bécancour--Nicolet--Saurel--Alnôbak	Duncan Viktor Salvain	Montréal

== History ==
It was created as "Richelieu" riding in 1968 from parts of Nicolet—Yamaska and Richelieu—Verchères ridings.

It was renamed "Bas-Richelieu—Nicolet—Bécancour" in 1998.

In 2003, Bas-Richelieu—Nicolet—Bécancour was abolished when it was redistributed into a new "Richelieu" riding, which incorporated parts of Lotbinière—L'Érable riding. Richelieu was renamed "Bas-Richelieu—Nicolet—Bécancour" after the 2004 election.

Following the 2012 federal electoral redistribution the riding retained its boundaries but was renamed Bécancour—Nicolet—Saurel.

Following the 2022 federal electoral redistribution the riding retained its boundaries, but was renamed Bécancour—Nicolet—Saurel—Alnôbak.

=== Members of Parliament ===
This riding has elected the following members of Parliament:

Parliament	Years	Member	Party
Richelieu; Riding created from Nicolet—Yamaska and Richelieu—Verchères
28th	1968–1972	Florian Côté	Liberal
29th	1972–1974	Florian Côté	Liberal
30th	1974–1979	Florian Côté	Liberal
31st	1979–1980	Jean-Louis Leduc	Liberal
32nd	1980–1984	Jean-Louis Leduc	Liberal
33rd	1984–1988	Louis Plamondon	Progressive Conservative
34th	1988–1990	Louis Plamondon	Progressive Conservative
34th	1990–1990	Louis Plamondon	Independent
34th	1990–1993	Louis Plamondon	Bloc Québécois
35th	1993–1997	Louis Plamondon	Bloc Québécois
36th	1997–2000	Louis Plamondon	Bloc Québécois
Bas-Richelieu—Nicolet—Bécancour
37th	2000–2004	Louis Plamondon	Bloc Québécois
Richelieu
38th	2004–2006	Louis Plamondon	Bloc Québécois
Bas-Richelieu—Nicolet—Bécancour
39th	2006–2008	Louis Plamondon	Bloc Québécois
40th	2008–2011	Louis Plamondon	Bloc Québécois
41st	2011–2015	Louis Plamondon	Bloc Québécois
Bécancour—Nicolet—Saurel
42nd	2015–2018	Louis Plamondon	Bloc Québécois
42nd	2018–2018	Louis Plamondon	Groupe parlementaire québécois
42nd	2018–2019	Louis Plamondon	Bloc Québécois
43rd	2019–2021	Louis Plamondon	Bloc Québécois
44th	2021–2025	Louis Plamondon	Bloc Québécois
Bécancour—Nicolet—Saurel—Alnôbak
45th	2025–present	Louis Plamondon	Bloc Québécois

== Election results ==
Graph of election results in Bécancour—Nicolet—Saurel (parties that never received at least 2% of the vote are omitted) View source data.

=== Bécancour—Nicolet—Saurel—Alnôbak ===
2025 Canadian federal election
Party	Candidate	Votes	%	±%	Expenditures
Bloc Québécois	Louis Plamondon	25,506	46.96	–7.84	$70,643.74
Liberal	Pierre Tousignant	14,813	27.27	+10.37	$29,924.87
Conservative	Michel Plourde	11,717	21.57	+4.77	$13,275.90
New Democratic	Tommy Gagnon	1,112	2.05	–3.05	$116.23
Green	Yanick Lapierre	738	1.36	–0.18	$1,632.65
People's	Lara Stillo	432	0.80	–1.63	$349.37
Total valid votes		54,318	98.24	+0.35	$128,973.15
Total rejected ballots		973	1.76	-0.35	
Turnout		55,291	67.32	+3.91	
Eligible voters		82,136			
Bloc Québécois notional hold		Swing		–9.11	
Source: Elections Canada
Note: number of eligible voters does not include voting day registrations.

=== Bécancour—Nicolet—Saurel, 2013 representation order ===
2021 Canadian federal election: Bécancour—Nicolet—Saurel
Party	Candidate	Votes	%	±%	Expenditures
Bloc Québécois	Louis Plamondon	27,403	54.80	-1.86	$65,506.85
Liberal	Nathalie Rochefort	8,451	16.90	-0.93	none listed
Conservative	Yanick Caisse	8,404	16.81	+0.69	$0.00
New Democratic	Catherine Gauvin	2,550	5.10	-0.12	$24.38
Free	André Blanchette	1,215	2.43	–	$635.50
People's	Eric Pettersen	1,214	2.43	+1.49	$814.69
Green	David Turcotte	770	1.54	-1.70	$0.00
Total valid votes/expense limit		50,007	97.89	–	$110,921.16
Total rejected ballots		1,080	2.11		
Turnout		51,087	63.40	-4.80	
Registered voters		80,573			
Bloc Québécois hold		Swing		-0.46	
Source: Elections Canada

2019 Canadian federal election: Bécancour—Nicolet—Saurel
Party	Candidate	Votes	%	±%	Expenditures
Bloc Québécois	Louis Plamondon	29,653	56.66	+16.68	$45,011.99
Liberal	Nathalie Rochefort	9,332	17.83	-6.43	none listed
Conservative	Pierre-André Émond	8,434	16.11	+4.7	none listed
New Democratic	Carole Lennard	2,732	5.22	-16.87	$0.10
Green	David Turcotte	1,697	3.24	+0.98	$0.00
People's	Richard Synnott	489	0.93	–	none listed
Total valid votes/expense limit		52,337	98.05		
Total rejected ballots		1,042	1.95	+0.15	
Turnout		53,379	67.30	-0.33	
Eligible voters		79,314			
Bloc Québécois hold		Swing		+11.56	
Source: Elections Canada

Bécancour—Nicolet—Saurel retained the same boundaries as its predecessor, Bas-Richelieu—Nicolet—Bécancour, for the 42nd Canadian federal election:

2015 Canadian federal election: Bécancour—Nicolet—Saurel
Party	Candidate	Votes	%	±%	Expenditures
Bloc Québécois	Louis Plamondon	20,871	39.98	+1.68	$130,287.00
Liberal	Claude Carpentier	12,666	24.26	+14.16	$24,296.48
New Democratic	Nicholas Tabah	11,531	22.09	-13.51	$78,226.90
Conservative	Yves Laberge	5,955	11.41	-1.62	$1,826.37
Green	Corina Bastiani	1,182	2.26	-0.71	$3,552.67
Total valid votes/Expense limit		52,205	100.0		$213,094.70
Total rejected ballots		958	1.80	–	
Turnout		53,163	67.63	–	
Eligible voters		78,607			
Bloc Québécois hold		Swing		+7.60	
Source: Elections Canada

=== Bas-Richelieu—Nicolet—Bécancour, 2003 representation order ===
2011 Canadian federal election: Bas-Richelieu—Nicolet—Bécancour
Party	Candidate	Votes	%	±%	Expenditures
Bloc Québécois	Louis Plamondon	19,046	38.30	−16.37	$78,417.55
New Democratic	Krista Lalonde	17,705	35.60	+27.43	none listed
Conservative	Charles Cartier	6,478	13.03	−5.12	$21,283.89
Liberal	Rhéal Blais	5,024	10.10	−6.18	$33,774.36
Green	Anne-Marie Tanguay	1,479	2.97	+0.25	none listed
Total valid votes/expense limit		49,732	100.0		$86,248.62
Total rejected, unmarked and declined ballots		1,058	2.08	+0.24	
Turnout		50,790	65.71	+0.26	
Eligible voters		77,290			
Bloc Québécois hold		Swing		−21.90	

2008 Canadian federal election: Bas-Richelieu—Nicolet—Bécancour
Party	Candidate	Votes	%	±%	Expenditures
Bloc Québécois	Louis Plamondon	26,821	54.67	−1.25	$81,799.37
Conservative	Réjean Bériault	8,904	18.15	−5.21	$36,546.14
Liberal	Ghislaine Cournoyer	7,987	16.28	+3.30	$12,932.15
New Democratic	Nourredine Seddiki	4,010	8.17	+3.64	$3,019.73
Green	Rebecca Laplante	1,334	2.72	−0.50	none listed
Total valid votes/expense limit		49,056	100.0		$83,078
Total rejected, unmarked and declined ballots		918	1.84	+0.10	
Turnout		49,974	65.45	−1.41	
Eligible voters		76,352			
Bloc Québécois hold		Swing		+1.98	
Sources: Official Results, Elections Canada and Financial Returns, Elections Canada.

2006 Canadian federal election: Bas-Richelieu—Nicolet—Bécancour
Party	Candidate	Votes	%	±%	Expenditures
Bloc Québécois	Louis Plamondon	27,742	55.92	−8.75	$58,032.63
Conservative	Marie-Ève Hélie-Lambert	11,588	23.36	+15.71	$29,709.34
Liberal	Ghislaine Provencher	6,438	12.98	−9.70	$49,695.62
New Democratic	Marie-Claude Roberge Cartier	2,248	4.53	+2.44	none listed
Green	Louis Lacroix	1,595	3.22	+1.50	$115.96
Total valid votes/expense limit		49,611	100.00		$77,549
Total rejected, unmarked and declined ballots		877	1.74		
Turnout		50,488	66.86	+0.80	
Eligible voters		75,514			
Bloc Québécois hold		Swing		−12.23	
Sources: Official Results, Elections Canada and Financial Returns, Elections Canada.

=== Richelieu, 2003 representation order ===
2004 Canadian federal election: Richelieu
Party	Candidate	Votes	%	±%	Expenditures
Bloc Québécois	Louis Plamondon	31,497	64.67	+8.50	$62,831.92
Liberal	Ghislaine Provencher	11,045	22.68	−8.83	$57,727.26
Conservative	Daniel A. Proulx	3,726	7.65	−1.80	$4,855.32
New Democratic	Charles Bussières	1,017	2.09	+1.09	none listed
Green	Jean-Pierre Bonenfant	839	1.72	–	$475.00
Marijuana	Daniel Blackburn	580	1.19	–	none listed
Total valid votes/expense limit		48,704	100.00		$76,377
Total rejected, unmarked and declined ballots		1,308	2.62		
Turnout		50,012	66.06	+1.18	
Electors on the lists		75,702			
Changes from 2000 are based on redistributed results. Change for the Conservative Party is based on the combined Canadian Alliance and Progressive Conservative totals from 2000.
Bloc Québécois notional hold		Swing		+8.66	
Sources: Official Results, Elections Canada and Financial Returns, Elections Canada.

2000 federal election redistributed results
Party	Vote	%
Bloc Québécois	26,898	56.17
Liberal	15,089	31.51
Alliance	2,289	4.78
Progressive Conservative	2,233	4.67
Others	896	1.87
New Democratic	479	1.00

=== Bas-Richelieu—Nicolet—Bécancour, 1996 representation order ===
2000 Canadian federal election: Bas-Richelieu—Nicolet—Bécancour
Party	Candidate	Votes	%	±%	Expenditures
Bloc Québécois	Louis Plamondon	25,266	56.92	+2.12	$58,797
Liberal	Roland Paradis	13,781	31.04	+2.13	$50,880
Alliance	Frédéric Lajoie	2,078	4.68		$882
Progressive Conservative	Gabriel Rousseau	1,944	4.38	−9.78	$129
Marijuana	Black D. Blackburn	901	2.03	–	$9
New Democratic	Raymond Dorion	421	0.95	−1.18	none listed
Total valid votes		44,391	100.00		
Total rejected ballots		1,229			
Turnout		45,620	67.27	−8.80	
Electors on the lists		67,815			
Sources: Official Results, Elections Canada and Financial Returns, Elections Canada.

=== Richelieu, 1996 representation order ===
1997 Canadian federal election: Richelieu
Party	Candidate	Votes	%	±%	Expenditures
Bloc Québécois	Louis Plamondon	26,421	54.80		$59,298
Liberal	Jocelyn Paul	13,941	28.91	–	$41,680
Progressive Conservative	Yves Schelling	6,827	14.16		$1,580
New Democratic	Sylvain Pelletier	1,028	2.13		$560
Total valid votes		48,217	100.00		
Total rejected ballots		2,418			
Turnout		50,635	76.07		
Electors on the lists		66,566			
Sources: Official Results, Elections Canada and official contributions and expenses submitted by the candidates, provided by Elections Canada.

=== Richelieu, 1968–1996 ===
1993 Canadian federal election: Richelieu
Party	Candidate	Votes	%	±%	Expenditures
Bloc Québécois	Louis Plamondon	31,558	66.52		$44,261
Liberal	Michel Biron	10,933	23.05	+3.78	$46,920
Progressive Conservative	Lorraine Frappier	4,455	9.39	−59.52	$44,361
New Democratic	Carl Ethier	337	0.71	−6.06	$0
Commonwealth of Canada	Paulo da Silva	157	0.33		$0
Total valid votes		47,440	100.00		
Total rejected ballots		1,878			
Turnout		49,318	81.73	+1.89	
Electors on the lists		60,340			
Source: Thirty-fifth General Election, 1993: Official Voting Results, Published by the Chief Electoral Officer of Canada. Financial figures taken from the official contributions and expenses submitted by the candidates, provided by Elections Canada.

1988 Canadian federal election: Richelieu
Party	Candidate	Votes	%	±%	Expenditures
Progressive Conservative	Louis Plamondon	32,104	68.91		$40,540
Liberal	Yvon Hébert	8,979	19.27	–	$17,953
New Democratic	Gaston Dupuis	3,154	6.77		$0
Green	Jacqueline Lacoste	1,896	4.07	–	$133
Rhinoceros	Paul Poison Hevey	457	0.98	–	$0
Total valid votes		46,590	100.00		
Total rejected ballots		869			
Turnout		47,459	79.84		
Electors on the lists		59,440			
Source: Report of the Chief Electoral Officer, Thirty-fourth General Election, 1988.

1984 Canadian federal election: Richelieu
Party	Candidate	Votes	%	±%
Progressive Conservative	Louis Plamondon	28,747	59.22	+39.25
Liberal	Jean-Louis Leduc	14,933	30.76	−37.39
New Democratic	Gaston Dupuis	2,174	4.48	−2.96
Parti nationaliste	Guy Vachon	1,463	3.01	-
Rhinoceros	Yves Pi-oui Banville	945	1.95	−1.02
Social Credit	Rénald Bibeau	202	0.42	-
Commonwealth of Canada	Yves Julien	76	0.16	-
Total valid votes		48,540	100.00	
Total rejected ballots		661		
Turnout		49,201	81.64	
Electors on the lists		60,264		
Source: Report of the Chief Electoral Officer, Thirty-third General Election, 1984.

1980 Canadian federal election
Party	Candidate	Votes	%	±%
Liberal	Jean-Louis Leduc	27,886	68.15	+12.29
Progressive Conservative	Daniel Rock	8,155	19.97	-4.92
New Democratic	Julian Heller	3,004	7.34	+4.02
Rhinoceros	Hélène Moreau	1,215	2.97	+0.67
Independent	Jean-Paul Cadorette	268	0.65	Ø
Union populaire	Rolland Cousineau	265	0.65	+0.17
Marxist–Leninist	Mario Bellavance	124	0.30	-0.02

1979 Canadian federal election
Party	Candidate	Votes	%	±%
Liberal	Jean-Louis Leduc	25,264	55.86	-3.12
Progressive Conservative	Claude Gervais	11,258	24.89	-9.28
Social Credit	André Hébert	5,798	12.82	Ø
New Democratic	Madeleine Martel	1,500	3.32	-1.44
Rhinoceros	Jean-Serge Baribeau	1,041	2.30	Ø
Union populaire	Rolland Cousineau	218	0.48	Ø
Marxist–Leninist	Mario Bellavance	145	0.32	-1.77

1974 Canadian federal election
Party	Candidate	Votes	%	±%
Liberal	Florian Coté	20,801	58.98	+10.64
Progressive Conservative	Marcel Biron	12,052	34.17	+8.81
New Democratic	Hans-G. Zimmermann	1,679	4.76	+1.53
Marxist–Leninist	Robert Bibeau	737	2.09	Ø

1972 Canadian federal election
Party	Candidate	Votes	%	±%
Liberal	Florian Coté	18,087	48.34	-0.42
Progressive Conservative	Yvon Ménard	9,487	25.36	-14.25
Social Credit	Guy Dufour	8,340	22.30	Ø
New Democratic	René Bélanger	1,209	3.23	-0.9
Independent	Guy Mandeville	292	0.78	Ø

1968 Canadian federal election
Party	Candidate	Votes	%	±%
Liberal	Florian Coté	15,350	48.76	Ø
Progressive Conservative	Bernard Gagné	12,470	39.61	Ø
Ralliement créditiste	Armand Preston	1,966	6.25	Ø
New Democratic	Lise Proulx-Morgan	1,300	4.13	Ø
Independent	Joffre Ritter	395	1.25	Ø

== See also ==
- List of Canadian electoral districts
- Historical federal electoral districts of Canada

Parliament of Canada
Preceded by Nipissing—Timiskaming	Constituency represented by the speaker of the House of Commons; Sep 27 – Oct 3, 2023	Succeeded by Hull—Aylmer
