= Louis Plamondon =

Canadian politician (born 1943)

Louis Plamondon MP

38th Speaker of the House of Commons
- In office September 27, 2023 – October 3, 2023
- Preceded by: Anthony Rota
- Succeeded by: Greg Fergus

Leader of the Bloc Québécois in the House of Commons
- Interim
- In office August 12, 2014 – October 22, 2015
- Preceded by: Jean-François Fortin
- Succeeded by: Rhéal Fortin
- In office June 2, 2011 – December 16, 2013
- Preceded by: Pierre Paquette
- Succeeded by: André Bellavance
- In office 1992 – November 9, 1993
- Preceded by: Jean Lapierre
- Succeeded by: Michel Gauthier

Dean of the House of Commons
- Incumbent
- Assumed office October 14, 2008
- Preceded by: Bill Blaikie

Chair of the Bloc Québécois Parliamentary Caucus
- In office August 26, 2004 – February 28, 2018

Member of Parliament for Bécancour—Nicolet—Saurel—Alnôbak Bécancour—Nicolet—Saurel (2015–2025) Bas—Richelieu—Nicolet—Bécancour (2000–2015) Richelieu (1984–2000)
- Incumbent
- Assumed office September 4, 1984
- Preceded by: Jean-Louis Leduc

Personal details
- Born: July 31, 1943 (age 83) Saint-Raymond, Quebec, Canada
- Party: Bloc Québécois (1990–2018, 2018–present)
- Other political affiliations: Québec debout (2018); Progressive Conservative (1984–1990)
- Spouse: Manon St-Germain (died 2025)
- Relatives: Luc Plamondon (brother)
- Education: Laval University (BA); University of Montreal
- Occupation: Politician; businessman
- Website: www.louisplamondon.com

Louis Plamondon MP (born July 31, 1943) is a Canadian politician who has served as a member of Parliament (MP) since his election in 1984. He represents Bécancour—Nicolet—Saurel (formerly known as Bas-Richelieu—Nicolet—Bécancour and Richelieu) and briefly served as the 38th speaker of the House of Commons in an interim capacity in 2023. Plamondon is a member of the Bloc Québécois; he was first elected as a Progressive Conservative (PC), until leaving the PC caucus in 1990.

Plamondon has won his seat in twelve consecutive federal elections, winning twice as a Progressive Conservative before becoming a founding member of the Bloc Québécois in 1990, after which he has been re-elected ten more times. He, along with six other Bloc MPs, resigned from the Bloc's caucus to sit as an independent MP on February 28, 2018 citing conflicts with the leadership style of Martine Ouellet. He rejoined the Bloc Québécois caucus on September 17, 2018.

In November 2025, Plamondon became the MP with the longest continuous service in Canadian history, with 15,059 days, exceeding the record of Sir Wilfrid Laurier. As the longest-serving current member of the House of Commons, Plamondon is Dean of the House, and also holds the record as Canada's longest-serving dean.

== Early life and career ==
Plamondon was born in Saint-Raymond-de-Portneuf, Quebec and is the brother of lyricist Luc Plamondon. He has a teaching certificate from L'École normale Maurice L. Duplessis (1964), a Bachelor of Arts degree from Laval University (1968), and a B.A.An. from the University of Montreal (1976). He was a math teacher and restaurant owner before entering political life. Plamondon supported the "oui" side in Quebec's 1980 referendum on sovereignty.

== Member of Parliament ==
=== Progressive Conservative MP ===
Plamondon was first elected to the Canadian House of Commons in the 1984 federal election, defeating Liberal Party incumbent Jean-Louis Leduc in Richelieu. The Progressive Conservatives won a landslide majority government in this election under Brian Mulroney's leadership, and Plamondon entered parliament as a government backbencher. He was associated with the Quebec nationalist wing of his party and soon became known as a maverick. In 1986, he criticized justice minister John Crosbie for appointing an anglophone to replace the sole francophone judge on the Ontario Court of Appeal. He later criticized industry minister Sinclair Stevens for awarding a multimillion-dollar untendered contract to a shipbuilding company in Quebec City. Plamondon also expressed sympathy with fellow MP Robert Toupin, who left the Progressive Conservatives in May 1986 to sit as an independent.

Plamondon was on the socially liberal wing of the Progressive Conservative Party. He voted against a motion to reintroduce capital punishment in 1987 and later opposed efforts to restrict abortion services. He strongly supported the Mulroney government's efforts to strengthen official bilingualism and criticized dissident anglophone Tory MPs who tried to weaken the government's reforms.

Plamondon was also one of the more pro-labour members of the Tory caucus. In 1985, he promoted a partnership between the federal and Quebec governments and the Quebec Federation of Labour's Solidarity Fund. Two years later, he stood with striking letter carriers in Sorel and criticized his own government's decision to approve replacement workers. He was prominent among a group of Quebec Tory MPs who tried to reduce the party's reliance on corporate donations. Ricardo López, a right-wing Quebec Tory MP, once suggested that Plamondon would be more suited to the social democratic New Democratic Party.

Plamondon was re-elected without difficulty in the 1988 federal election, as the Progressive Conservatives won a second majority government across the country. Over the following year, he became even more strongly aligned with the Quebec nationalist wing of his party. He supported Quebec premier Robert Bourassa's use of the Canadian constitution's notwithstanding clause to prohibit outdoor English-language signs, and expressed regret that the ban was not extended to indoor signs. He also criticized D'Iberville Fortier, Canada's official languages commissioner, for suggesting that Quebec was acting in an unjust manner toward its anglophone minority.

Consistent with his nationalist views, Plamondon was a vocal supporter of the Mulroney government's proposed Meech Lake Accord on constitutional reform and opposed Jean Charest's efforts to modify the accord in early 1990. During this period, Plamondon speculated that sovereignty-association between Quebec and Canada would be "logical and reasonable" if the accord failed and added that he might become a "Quebec-only MP" in that event. When the accord was rejected in June 1990, Plamondon resigned from the Progressive Conservative caucus and informed the House of Commons that he could no longer support a united Canada.

=== Bloc Québécois MP ===
==== Mulroney and Campbell Governments (1990–93 ) ====
Plamondon was one of a group of Progressive Conservative and Liberal MPs from Quebec who left their parties after the failure of the Meech Lake Accord. This group soon coalesced as the Bloc Québécois under the leadership of Lucien Bouchard. The Bloc was not initially given official recognition in the House of Commons, and its members were designated as independent MPs. Plamondon was recognized as the Bloc's house leader in 1992.

In its original form, the Bloc Québécois was a loose alliance of parliamentarians rather than a formal political party. Plamondon was one of the first Bloquistes to promote the creation of a strong party organization to challenge the Progressive Conservative Party's Quebec machine in the next federal election. Others, including Lucien Bouchard, initially favoured a weaker party structure that would simply allow Bloc candidates to have their party designation appear on the ballot. The vision favoured by Plamondon ultimately won out, and the Bloc became a strong political organization throughout Quebec.

Shortly after joining the BQ, Plamondon asked the federal government to apologize to the province of Quebec and provide financial compensation for those who were wrongly arrested under the War Measures Act in the 1970 FLQ Crisis. He later spoke against a bid by Izzy Asper to bring his Global Television Network to Montreal, arguing that the market was already saturated. In 1992, he described Mordechai Richler's book Oh Canada! Oh Quebec! as hate literature.

Plamondon was charged with attempting to hire a prostitute during an undercover sting operation in April 1993. He claimed innocence, saying that the charge was the result of a "bad joke between friends which lasted 45 seconds," but nonetheless resigned as his party's house leader pending resolution of the matter. He was renominated as the Bloc candidate for Richelieu despite the controversy.

==== Chrétien Government (1993–2003) ====
Plamondon was re-elected without difficulty in the 1993 federal election, as the Bloc won fifty-four out of seventy-five seats in Quebec to become the official opposition in the House of Commons. The Liberal Party won a majority government under the leadership of Jean Chrétien. At his own request, Plamondon was left out of the Bloc's initial shadow cabinet. He pleaded guilty to the charge against him in April 1994, maintaining his innocence but adding that he simply wanted to resolve the matter as quickly as possible. He received an absolute discharge and does not have a criminal record.

Plamondon co-chaired a funding and membership drive for the Bloc in early 1995. He opposed finance minister Paul Martin's austerity budget in the same year, arguing that it placed an unfair financial burden on the provinces to fight the federal deficit. He personally opposed the Chrétien government's gun registry legislation, which the Bloc supported, and he absented himself from the parliamentary vote that led to its passage.

After a narrow federalist victory in Quebec's 1995 referendum on sovereignty, Lucien Bouchard left the Bloc Québécois to become leader of its provincial counterpart, the Parti Québécois (PQ). Plamondon initially favoured Bernard Landry to become the Bloc's new leader, arguing that he was the best positioned of all candidates to unite the party's different factions. Landry decided not to run, and Gilles Duceppe eventually succeeded Bouchard as leader.

Plamondon supported the Chrétien government's choice of Dyane Adam to become Canada's official language commissioner in 1998, saying that she would be "tougher" than her predecessor Victor Goldbloom (whom he nonetheless acknowledged had done good work on education matters). He endorsed Adam's criticism of the Chrétien government in 2000, when she wrote that it was not sufficiently committed to defending official bilingualism. Plamondon strongly opposed the Clarity Act legislation introduced by intergovernmental affairs minister Stéphane Dion in 1999, arguing that it would create confusion in any future referendum on Quebec sovereignty.

==== Martin Government (2003–2006) ====
Paul Martin replaced Jean Chrétien as Liberal Party leader and prime minister in late 2003. Shortly before he was sworn in, Plamondon published a short book entitled Le mythe Paul Martin. As its title implies, the work was highly critical of its subject: Plamondon accused Martin of damaging Quebec's interests during his time in the Chrétien cabinet. He also argued that Martin would become an ally of United States president George W. Bush, neglect the low-income citizens of Canada and Quebec, and favour the interests of English Canada. The Bloc distributed one thousand free copies of the book, and a further fifteen hundred copies were put on sale in bookstores. Martin's supporters dismissed the work as a negative campaign ploy lacking any progressive vision, and Liberal MP Don Boudria asked the speaker of the House of Commons to investigate whether Plamondon had broken parliamentary rules by using publicly funded research staff to help compile the book.

It was initially believed that Paul Martin's Liberals would win a majority of seats in Quebec at the expense of the Bloc, but the Liberal Party's fortunes were instead damaged by the sponsorship scandal, in which some advertising revenues approved by the Chrétien government to promote Canadian federalism in Quebec were found to have been misused. The Bloc soon re-established itself as the dominant federal party in Quebec, and the Liberals were reduced to a minority government in the 2004 federal election. Plamondon was chosen as BQ caucus chair in the new parliament.

When Bernard Landry resigned as Parti Québécois leader in 2005, rumours circulated that Gilles Duceppe would run to succeed him. Plamondon said that most Bloc MPs wanted Duceppe to stay in federal politics but would respect his decision one way or the other. Duceppe chose to remain with the Bloc, and André Boisclair became PQ leader.

==== Harper Government (2006–2015) ====
Plamondon was elected to a seventh term in the 2006 federal election, as the Conservative Party won a minority government under the leadership of Stephen Harper. Widely respected as an electoral strategist, Plamondon later prepared an internal brief examining why the Bloc lost seats in the Quebec City area to the Conservatives. He remained as the Bloc's caucus chair.

André Boisclair resigned as Parti Québécois leader after a poor showing in the 2007 provincial election, and rumours again circulated that Duceppe would run to succeed him. This time, Plamondon told reporters that Duceppe should run for the provincial leadership to impose discipline on the notoriously unruly party. Some in the PQ objected to this comment, which galvanized resistance to a Duceppe candidacy. Duceppe eventually entered the leadership contest, but withdrew after only one day due to poor polling and a growing sense that the sovereigntist movement would be divided if he won. He stayed as leader of the Bloc, and Plamondon helped ensure his successful transition back to the federal scene.

When Brian Mulroney released his memoirs in September 2007, he alleged that Lucien Bouchard had conspired with Jacques Parizeau to create the Bloc Québécois while still a federal cabinet minister. Plamondon rejected this, arguing that Bouchard was loyal to Mulroney until resigning in protest against the government's handling of the Meech Lake Accord. Plamondon also criticized Jean Chrétien later in the year, when Chrétien wrote in his memoirs that he would not have recognized a narrow sovereigntist victory in the 1995 referendum.

Plamondon was re-elected to an eighth term in the 2008 election as the Conservatives won a second consecutive minority government. He was again chosen as BQ caucus chair and, as the longest-serving member of the House of Commons, was also recognized as Dean of the House. Plamondon presided over the Commons when it re-elected Peter Milliken as its speaker in October 2008 and acknowledged the irony that an MP from a sovereigntist party would hold this position.

Plamondon was returned by the narrowest margin of his career in the 2011 federal election following a strong challenge from the New Democratic Party (NDP). Gilles Duceppe was personally defeated in his riding and subsequently resigned as party leader; the Bloc won only four seats including Plamondon's and consequently lost official party status. Plamondon was chosen as the Bloc's acting house leader and, in the absence of a full-time leader, became its main parliamentary spokesperson. He remains Dean of the House and presided over the Commons when it chose Andrew Scheer to be Milliken's successor as speaker on June 2, 2011; the Harper-led Conservatives had won a majority government at the election.

==== Trudeau Government (2015–2025) ====
Plamondon was the Bloc candidate in his riding for the 2015 Canadian federal election, and was the only Bloc MP elected in 2011 to be running under the party banner again. He was re-elected to a tenth term in the House of Commons, presiding over the House as it elected Geoff Regan as speaker; the Liberals had won a majority government under the leadership of Justin Trudeau. He was reelected to an 11th term in October 2019, to retain his position as Dean of the House and preside over the election of Anthony Rota as speaker. In the 2021 Canadian federal election, Plamondon was elected to Parliament for the 12th time. He was appointed the Library of Parliament committee and caucus vice-chair in the Bloc Québécois Shadow Cabinet.

In 2023, Plamondon eclipsed Herb Gray as the longest-serving Dean of the House, with 15 years in the role. Upon the resignation of Speaker Anthony Rota in September 2023, Plamondon served as interim speaker, and as Dean of the House, served for the sixth time as the presiding officer in the election of the subsequent speaker, Greg Fergus.

==== Carney Government (2025–) ====
In 2025, Plamondon was elected for a 13th time, to the 45th Canadian Parliament. He once again presided as the Dean of the House during the election of a Speaker; Liberal MP Francis Scarpaleggia was elected. He was re-elected vice chair of the Standing Joint Committee on the Library of Parliament in the 45th Canadian Parliament in 2025.

On November 26, 2025, he was recognized as the longest continuously serving MP in Canadian history, exceeding Sir Wilfrid Laurier. (Laurier served 16,411 days in total, but lost his seat in 1877 before being reelected.) The 82-year-old Plamondon declared he would continue to run for reelection as long as his health held out. He was applauded by other MPs, with Bloc Québécois leader Yves-François Blanchet joking that "the only way Canada will get rid of this tenacious MP is to grant Quebec independence."

== Personal life ==
Plamondon is a widower; his wife of nearly 35 years, Manon St-Germain, died in September 2025 at age 67.

== Publications ==
- Le mythe Paul Martin, 2003

== Electoral record ==
2025 Canadian federal election: Bécancour—Nicolet—Saurel—Alnôbak
Party	Candidate	Votes	%	±%	Expenditures
Bloc Québécois	Louis Plamondon	25,506	46.96	–7.84	$70,643.74
Liberal	Pierre Tousignant	14,813	27.27	+10.37	$29,924.87
Conservative	Michel Plourde	11,717	21.57	+4.77	$13,275.90
New Democratic	Tommy Gagnon	1,112	2.05	–3.05	$116.23
Green	Yanick Lapierre	738	1.36	–0.18	$1,632.65
People's	Lara Stillo	432	0.80	–1.63	$349.37
Total valid votes		54,318	98.24	+0.35	$128,973.15
Total rejected ballots		973	1.76	-0.35	
Turnout		55,291	67.32	+3.91	
Eligible voters		82,136			
Bloc Québécois notional hold		Swing		–9.11	
Source: Elections Canada
Note: number of eligible voters does not include voting day registrations.

2021 Canadian federal election: Bécancour—Nicolet—Saurel
Party	Candidate	Votes	%	±%	Expenditures
Bloc Québécois	Louis Plamondon	27,403	54.80	-1.86	$65,506.85
Liberal	Nathalie Rochefort	8,451	16.90	-0.93	none listed
Conservative	Yanick Caisse	8,404	16.81	+0.69	$0.00
New Democratic	Catherine Gauvin	2,550	5.10	-0.12	$24.38
Free	André Blanchette	1,215	2.43	–	$635.50
People's	Eric Pettersen	1,214	2.43	+1.49	$814.69
Green	David Turcotte	770	1.54	-1.70	$0.00
Total valid votes/expense limit		50,007	97.89	–	$110,921.16
Total rejected ballots		1,080	2.11		
Turnout		51,087	63.40	-4.80	
Registered voters		80,573			
Bloc Québécois hold		Swing		-0.46	
Source: Elections Canada

2019 Canadian federal election: Bécancour—Nicolet—Saurel
Party	Candidate	Votes	%	±%	Expenditures
Bloc Québécois	Louis Plamondon	29,653	56.66	+16.68	$45,011.99
Liberal	Nathalie Rochefort	9,332	17.83	-6.43	none listed
Conservative	Pierre-André Émond	8,434	16.11	+4.7	none listed
New Democratic	Carole Lennard	2,732	5.22	-16.87	$0.10
Green	David Turcotte	1,697	3.24	+0.98	$0.00
People's	Richard Synnott	489	0.93	–	none listed
Total valid votes/expense limit		52,337	98.05		
Total rejected ballots		1,042	1.95	+0.15	
Turnout		53,379	67.30	-0.33	
Eligible voters		79,314			
Bloc Québécois hold		Swing		+11.56	
Source: Elections Canada

2015 Canadian federal election: Bécancour—Nicolet—Saurel
Party	Candidate	Votes	%	±%	Expenditures
Bloc Québécois	Louis Plamondon	20,871	39.98	+1.68	–
Liberal	Claude Carpentier	12,666	24.26	+14.16	–
New Democratic	Nicholas Tabah	11,531	22.09	-13.51	–
Conservative	Yves Laberge	5,955	11.41	-1.62	–
Green	Corina Bastiani	1,182	2.26	-0.71	–
Total valid votes/Expense limit		52,205	100.0		$212,219.80
Total rejected ballots		958	–	–	
Turnout		53,163	–	–	
Eligible voters		78,607			
Bloc Québécois hold		Swing		+7.60	
Source: Elections Canada

2011 Canadian federal election: Bas-Richelieu—Nicolet—Bécancour
Party	Candidate	Votes	%	±%	Expenditures
Bloc Québécois	Louis Plamondon	19,046	38.30	−16.37	$78,417.55
New Democratic	Krista Lalonde	17,705	35.60	+27.43	none listed
Conservative	Charles Cartier	6,478	13.03	−5.12	$21,283.89
Liberal	Rhéal Blais	5,024	10.10	−6.18	$33,774.36
Green	Anne-Marie Tanguay	1,479	2.97	+0.25	none listed
Total valid votes/expense limit		49,732	100.0		$86,248.62
Total rejected, unmarked and declined ballots		1,058	2.08	+0.24	
Turnout		50,790	65.71	+0.26	
Eligible voters		77,290			
Bloc Québécois hold		Swing		−21.90	

2008 Canadian federal election: Bas-Richelieu—Nicolet—Bécancour
Party	Candidate	Votes	%	±%	Expenditures
Bloc Québécois	Louis Plamondon	26,821	54.67	−1.25	$81,799.37
Conservative	Réjean Bériault	8,904	18.15	−5.21	$36,546.14
Liberal	Ghislaine Cournoyer	7,987	16.28	+3.30	$12,932.15
New Democratic	Nourredine Seddiki	4,010	8.17	+3.64	$3,019.73
Green	Rebecca Laplante	1,334	2.72	−0.50	none listed
Total valid votes/expense limit		49,056	100.0		$83,078
Total rejected, unmarked and declined ballots		918	1.84	+0.10	
Turnout		49,974	65.45	−1.41	
Eligible voters		76,352			
Bloc Québécois hold		Swing		+1.98	
Sources: Official Results, Elections Canada and Financial Returns, Elections Canada.

2006 Canadian federal election: Bas-Richelieu—Nicolet—Bécancour
Party	Candidate	Votes	%	±%	Expenditures
Bloc Québécois	Louis Plamondon	27,742	55.92	−8.75	$58,032.63
Conservative	Marie-Ève Hélie-Lambert	11,588	23.36	+15.71	$29,709.34
Liberal	Ghislaine Provencher	6,438	12.98	−9.70	$49,695.62
New Democratic	Marie-Claude Roberge Cartier	2,248	4.53	+2.44	none listed
Green	Louis Lacroix	1,595	3.22	+1.50	$115.96
Total valid votes/expense limit		49,611	100.00		$77,549
Total rejected, unmarked and declined ballots		877	1.74		
Turnout		50,488	66.86	+0.80	
Eligible voters		75,514			
Bloc Québécois hold		Swing		−12.23	
Sources: Official Results, Elections Canada and Financial Returns, Elections Canada.

2004 Canadian federal election: Richelieu
Party	Candidate	Votes	%	±%	Expenditures
Bloc Québécois	Louis Plamondon	31,497	64.67	+8.50	$62,831.92
Liberal	Ghislaine Provencher	11,045	22.68	−8.83	$57,727.26
Conservative	Daniel A. Proulx	3,726	7.65	−1.80	$4,855.32
New Democratic	Charles Bussières	1,017	2.09	+1.09	none listed
Green	Jean-Pierre Bonenfant	839	1.72	–	$475.00
Marijuana	Daniel Blackburn	580	1.19	–	none listed
Total valid votes/expense limit		48,704	100.00		$76,377
Total rejected, unmarked and declined ballots		1,308	2.62		
Turnout		50,012	66.06	+1.18	
Electors on the lists		75,702			
Changes from 2000 are based on redistributed results. Change for the Conservative Party is based on the combined Canadian Alliance and Progressive Conservative totals from 2000.
Bloc Québécois notional hold		Swing		+8.66	
Sources: Official Results, Elections Canada and Financial Returns, Elections Canada.

2000 Canadian federal election: Bas-Richelieu—Nicolet—Bécancour
Party	Candidate	Votes	%	±%	Expenditures
Bloc Québécois	Louis Plamondon	25,266	56.92	+2.12	$58,797
Liberal	Roland Paradis	13,781	31.04	+2.13	$50,880
Alliance	Frédéric Lajoie	2,078	4.68		$882
Progressive Conservative	Gabriel Rousseau	1,944	4.38	−9.78	$129
Marijuana	Black D. Blackburn	901	2.03	–	$9
New Democratic	Raymond Dorion	421	0.95	−1.18	none listed
Total valid votes		44,391	100.00		
Total rejected ballots		1,229			
Turnout		45,620	67.27	−8.80	
Electors on the lists		67,815			
Sources: Official Results, Elections Canada and Financial Returns, Elections Canada.

1997 Canadian federal election: Richelieu
Party	Candidate	Votes	%	±%	Expenditures
Bloc Québécois	Louis Plamondon	26,421	54.80		$59,298
Liberal	Jocelyn Paul	13,941	28.91	–	$41,680
Progressive Conservative	Yves Schelling	6,827	14.16		$1,580
New Democratic	Sylvain Pelletier	1,028	2.13		$560
Total valid votes		48,217	100.00		
Total rejected ballots		2,418			
Turnout		50,635	76.07		
Electors on the lists		66,566			
Sources: Official Results, Elections Canada and official contributions and expenses submitted by the candidates, provided by Elections Canada.

1993 Canadian federal election: Richelieu
Party	Candidate	Votes	%	±%	Expenditures
Bloc Québécois	Louis Plamondon	31,558	66.52		$44,261
Liberal	Michel Biron	10,933	23.05	+3.78	$46,920
Progressive Conservative	Lorraine Frappier	4,455	9.39	−59.52	$44,361
New Democratic	Carl Ethier	337	0.71	−6.06	$0
Commonwealth of Canada	Paulo da Silva	157	0.33		$0
Total valid votes		47,440	100.00		
Total rejected ballots		1,878			
Turnout		49,318	81.73	+1.89	
Electors on the lists		60,340			
Source: Thirty-fifth General Election, 1993: Official Voting Results, Published by the Chief Electoral Officer of Canada. Financial figures taken from the official contributions and expenses submitted by the candidates, provided by Elections Canada.

1988 Canadian federal election: Richelieu
Party	Candidate	Votes	%	±%	Expenditures
Progressive Conservative	Louis Plamondon	32,104	68.91		$40,540
Liberal	Yvon Hébert	8,979	19.27	–	$17,953
New Democratic	Gaston Dupuis	3,154	6.77		$0
Green	Jacqueline Lacoste	1,896	4.07	–	$133
Rhinoceros	Paul Poison Hevey	457	0.98	–	$0
Total valid votes		46,590	100.00		
Total rejected ballots		869			
Turnout		47,459	79.84		
Electors on the lists		59,440			
Source: Report of the Chief Electoral Officer, Thirty-fourth General Election, 1988.

1984 Canadian federal election: Richelieu
Party	Candidate	Votes	%	±%
Progressive Conservative	Louis Plamondon	28,747	59.22	+39.25
Liberal	Jean-Louis Leduc	14,933	30.76	−37.39
New Democratic	Gaston Dupuis	2,174	4.48	−2.96
Parti nationaliste	Guy Vachon	1,463	3.01	-
Rhinoceros	Yves Pi-oui Banville	945	1.95	−1.02
Social Credit	Rénald Bibeau	202	0.42	-
Commonwealth of Canada	Yves Julien	76	0.16	-
Total valid votes		48,540	100.00	
Total rejected ballots		661		
Turnout		49,201	81.64	
Electors on the lists		60,264		
Source: Report of the Chief Electoral Officer, Thirty-third General Election, 1984.
