= Dean of the House (Canada) =

Longest sitting member of the House of Commons

Dean of the Canadian House of Commons
- Incumbent; Louis Plamondon since October 14, 2008 (Note: Dean of the House since October 14, 2008. Member of Parliament since September 4, 1984.)
- Status: Longest serving Member of Parliament
- Member of: House of Commons
- Seat: West Block – Parliament Hill (Note: West Block is the temporary location of the House of Commons Chamber while the Centre Block is under renovation.); Ottawa, Ontario

In Canada, the dean of the House (French: doyen de la Chambre) is the sitting Member of the House of Commons with the longest unbroken record of service. The dean is responsible for presiding over the election of the Speaker of the House of Commons at the beginning of each Parliament. The position is the equivalent of the Father of the House in the British House of Commons.

Following a general election, or the resignation or death of the sitting Speaker, the House meets to elect a new Speaker. This was started in 1986, though Speaker John Bosley presided at the time. The first time the modern election system for speaker was used was in 1994.

During these elections, the Dean of the House takes the role of presiding officer. If the longest-serving member is a Cabinet Minister, party Leader, House Leader or Whip, they cannot act as presiding officer. In 1994, following the 1993 Canadian federal election, Liberal member Len Hopkins filled this role as his caucus mate Herb Gray, then the longest-serving member, was in Cabinet under Prime Minister Jean Chrétien. Although Gray was in cabinet, he was still referred to as Dean both in Hansard and by the press. Gray was also the longest-serving dean of the House up until that point, holding the role for 14 years from 1988 until 2002.

The current dean of the House is Bloc Québécois MP Louis Plamondon, who was first elected to the Commons as a member of the Progressive Conservative Party at the 1984 election. In 2023, Plamondon eclipsed Gray as the longest-serving dean of the House, with 15 years in the role. The second-longest serving MP is currently Liberal Hedy Fry, who has served continuously since the 1993 election. Upon the resignation of Speaker Anthony Rota in 2023, Plamondon served for the sixth time as presiding officer in the election of the Speaker.

The chart below refers to longest-serving members, some of whom served in frontbench roles and, as such, did not preside over the election of the Speaker.

== List of longest-serving members ==
Member	Party	Entered House	Became longest-serving member	Left House	Years as an MP	Years as Dean
John Costigan	Liberal-Conservative (until 1906)	1867	June 23, 1896	March 5, 1907	40	11
John Costigan	Liberal (after 1906)	1867	June 23, 1896	March 5, 1907	40	11
John Graham Haggart	Conservative	1872	March 5, 1907	March 13, 1913	41	6
Wilfrid Laurier (Note: Served as party leader during his tenure as longest-serving member.)	Liberal	1874	March 13, 1913	February 17, 1919	45	6
John D. Reid	Conservative	1891	February 17, 1919	December 6, 1921	30	2
William F. MacLean	Unionist	1892	December 6, 1921	September 14, 1926	34	5
Rodolphe Lemieux	Liberal	1896	September 14, 1926	July 28, 1930	34	4
Charles Marcil	Liberal	1900	July 28, 1930	March 22, 1937	37	7
Ernest Lapointe	Liberal	1904	March 22, 1937	November 26, 1941	37	4
Arthur Cardin	Liberal (until 1942)	1911	November 26, 1941	October 21, 1946	35	5
Arthur Cardin	Independent (after 1942)	1911	November 26, 1941	October 21, 1946	35	5
Charles Gavan Power	Liberal	1917	October 21, 1946	July 28, 1955	38	9
William Earl Rowe	Progressive Conservative	1925	July 28, 1955	April 8, 1963	38	8
Azellus Denis	Liberal	1935	April 8, 1963	February 3, 1964	29	1
Paul Martin Sr. (Note: Served as a cabinet minister during his tenure as longest-serving member.)	Liberal	1935	February 3, 1964	June 25, 1968	33	4
John Diefenbaker	Progressive Conservative	1940	June 25, 1968	August 16, 1979	39	11
Walter Dinsdale	Progressive Conservative	1951	August 16, 1979	November 20, 1982	31	3
Robert Coates (Note: Along with Lloyd Crouse.)	Progressive Conservative	1957	November 20, 1982	November 21, 1988	31	6
Herb Gray (Note: Served as a cabinet minister during his tenure as longest-serving member.)	Liberal	1962	November 21, 1988	January 14, 2002	40	14
Charles Caccia	Liberal	1968	January 14, 2002	June 28, 2004	36	2
Bill Blaikie	New Democrat	1979	June 28, 2004	October 14, 2008	29	4
Louis Plamondon (Note: Served as party leader and interim party leader during his tenure as longest-serving member.)	Progressive Conservative (until 1990)	1984	October 14, 2008	incumbent	41 (as of 2026, and since, April 3, 2024, he is the longest-serving undefeated elected representative in the history of the Canadian Parliament)	17 (as of 2025)
Louis Plamondon	Bloc Québécois (1990–2018)	1984	October 14, 2008	incumbent	41 (as of 2026, and since, April 3, 2024, he is the longest-serving undefeated elected representative in the history of the Canadian Parliament)	17 (as of 2025)
Louis Plamondon	Québec Debout (2018)	1984	October 14, 2008	incumbent	41 (as of 2026, and since, April 3, 2024, he is the longest-serving undefeated elected representative in the history of the Canadian Parliament)	17 (as of 2025)
Louis Plamondon	Bloc Québécois (2018–present)	1984	October 14, 2008	incumbent	41 (as of 2026, and since, April 3, 2024, he is the longest-serving undefeated elected representative in the history of the Canadian Parliament)	17 (as of 2025)
