= Canadian leaders' debates =

Televised election debates in Canada

The Canadian leaders' debates are leaders' debates televised during federal elections in Canada, made up of two debates, one in French and one in English, usually held on back-to-back nights. The first time these debates were held was during the 1968 election. They were until recently produced by a consortium of the main Canadian television networks, namely the CBC/SRC, CTV, Global and TVA, although other channels such as CPAC (and C-SPAN in the United States; English-language debate only) carry the broadcasts as well.

== Inclusion criteria ==
Although there are usually a dozen or so political parties registered with Elections Canada at any given time, not all party leaders are invited to the debates. The stated criteria for inclusion have shifted over time with the maneuvering for political advantage, but the typical criteria set by the debate consortium has been that a political party needs to have representation in the House of Commons. Over the years, there have been at least three and as many as six, leaders at each such debate. Public criticism of the debates has emerged outlining that corporate media executives decide who is allowed to be heard in a public forum critical to deciding elected officials. Given the overlap between governments and corporations, there is a conflict of interest having corporate executives impacting elections. There have been calls to have Elections Canada set up an impartial debates protocol.

Following the 1988 federal election, after a decision of the Attorney General of Canada to stay a prosecution under the Broadcasting Act initiated by the Canadian Radio-television and Telecommunications Commission (CRTC) against several Canadian television networks, at the instance of the CRTC, a private prosecution was instituted on behalf of the Green Party of Canada by former Chief Agent and Treasurer Greg Vezina against CBC, CTV and Global, claiming that these broadcasters had breached the Television Broadcasting Regulations 1987, because they had not included the Green Party and other accredited and registered small political party leaders in the leaders' debates during a federal general election and had failed to provide equitable time to them.

In R. v. Canadian Broadcasting Corporation et al., (1993) 51 CPR (3d) 192, the Ontario Court of Appeal held that debates were not of a partisan political character. The Court believed that while the participants in a debate may very well be partisan, the program itself, because it presented more than one view, was not. The court therefore ruled that debates were not covered by the relevant section of the regulations and notwithstanding provisions of under the Canada Elections Act limiting, restricting and in many cases prohibiting contributions of political advertising and broadcasting, declared both acts to be 'a complete code' and therefore there was no requirement to provide any time at all for parties or candidates excluded from debates during election campaigns no matter how many candidates or parties were excluded so long as two or more were included in such programs. (Broadcasters and other media used the same reasoning to exclude commentators and representatives from smaller parties in news and public affairs panels and programs both during and in between elections in Canada.) The case was appealed to the Supreme Court of Canada which refused to grant leave to appeal (without reasons as is the custom) in decision 23881 by Justices La Forest, Sopinka and Major JJ, released on May 6, 1994. Subsequently, the CRTC issued Public Notice CRTC 1995–44, Election-period broadcasting: Debates, which stated, In view of this judgment, the commission will no longer require that so-called "debates" programs feature all rival parties or candidates in one or more programs.

In both the 1993 election and the 2000 election, Greg Vezina working as an independent producer, the Green Party and the Natural Law Party of Canada organized All Party Leaders' Debates which invited the leaders of all registered and accredited parties to participate. On both occasions the leaders of the major parties declined, but the leaders of the other smaller political parties participated. While all other members of the Election Broadcasting Consortium failed to broadcast the 1993 program after announcing they would, in both the 1993 and 2000 the one-hour debates were carried on CBC Newsworld and the debates and another hour of town hall questions and answers afterword on CPAC (English: Cable Public Affairs Channel and in French: La Chaîne d'affaires publiques par câble). The debates were widely covered by the media including the Globe and Mail who wrote about the 2000 debate. The 2000 Debate was the first of its kind broadcast and archived on the Internet on the Democracy Channel website

Prior to the 2008 election, the Green Party, which, from at least the 1997 election until 2008, was consistently the highest-polling party among those without a seat in Parliament, had unsuccessfully argued on several occasions for a role in the debates.

In the 1993 French-language debate, Reform Party leader Preston Manning opted to make only an opening statement, as he was only fluent in English at the time. However, as parties with seats in the House of Commons prior to the election, they qualified regardless of this criticism.

== 1968 debate ==
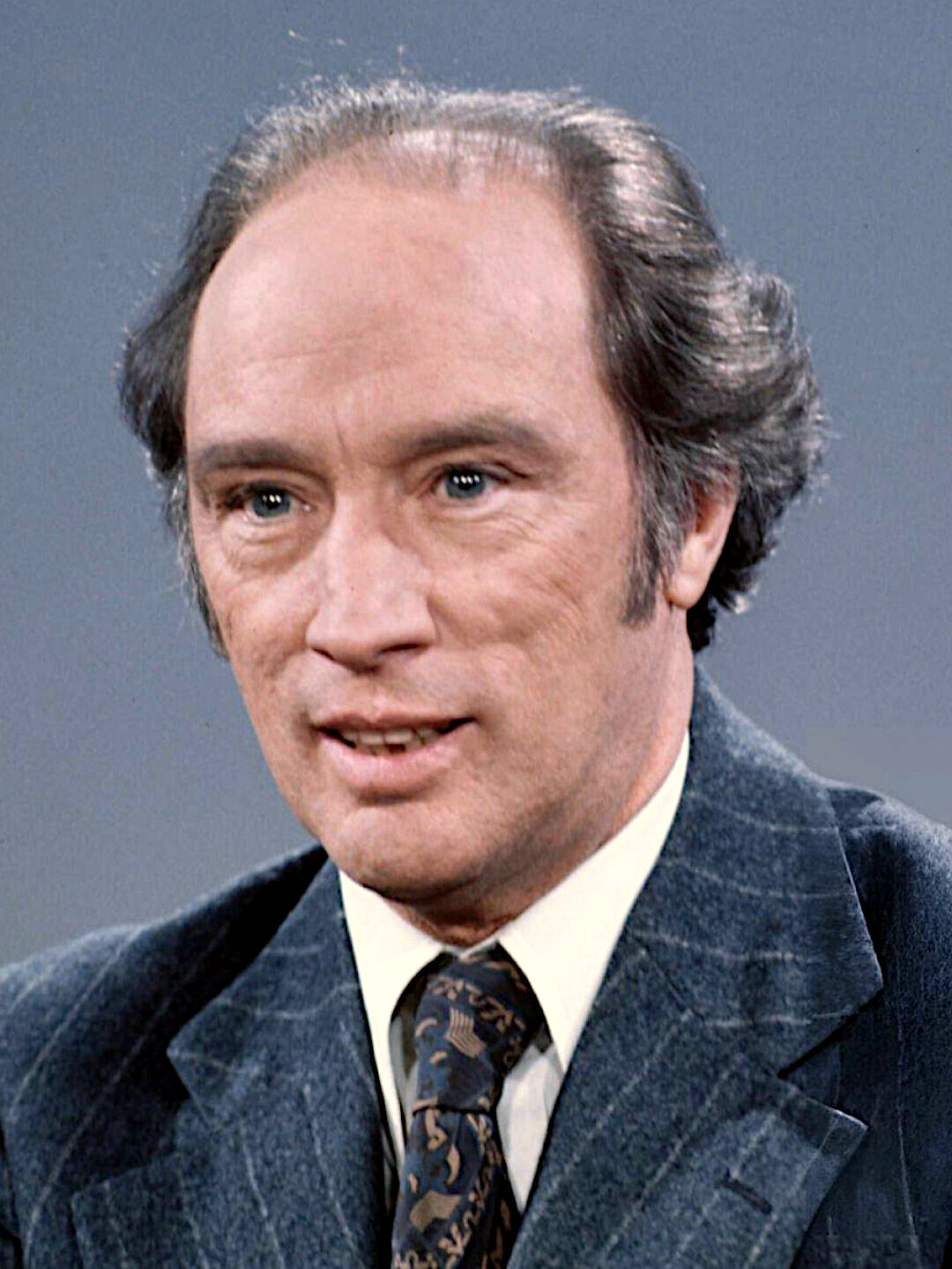
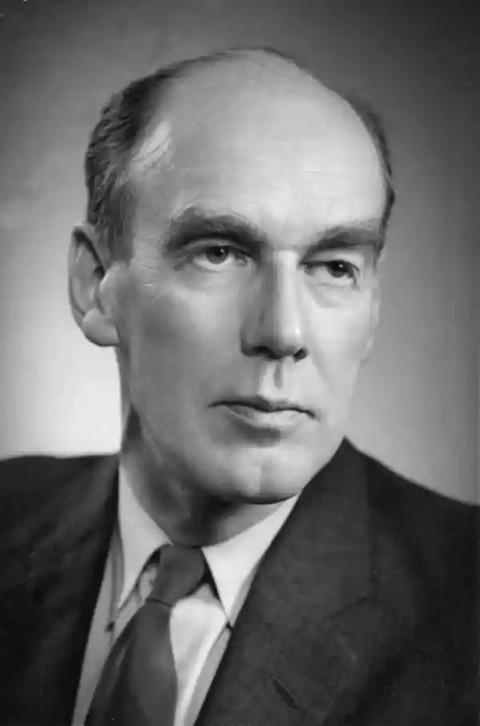
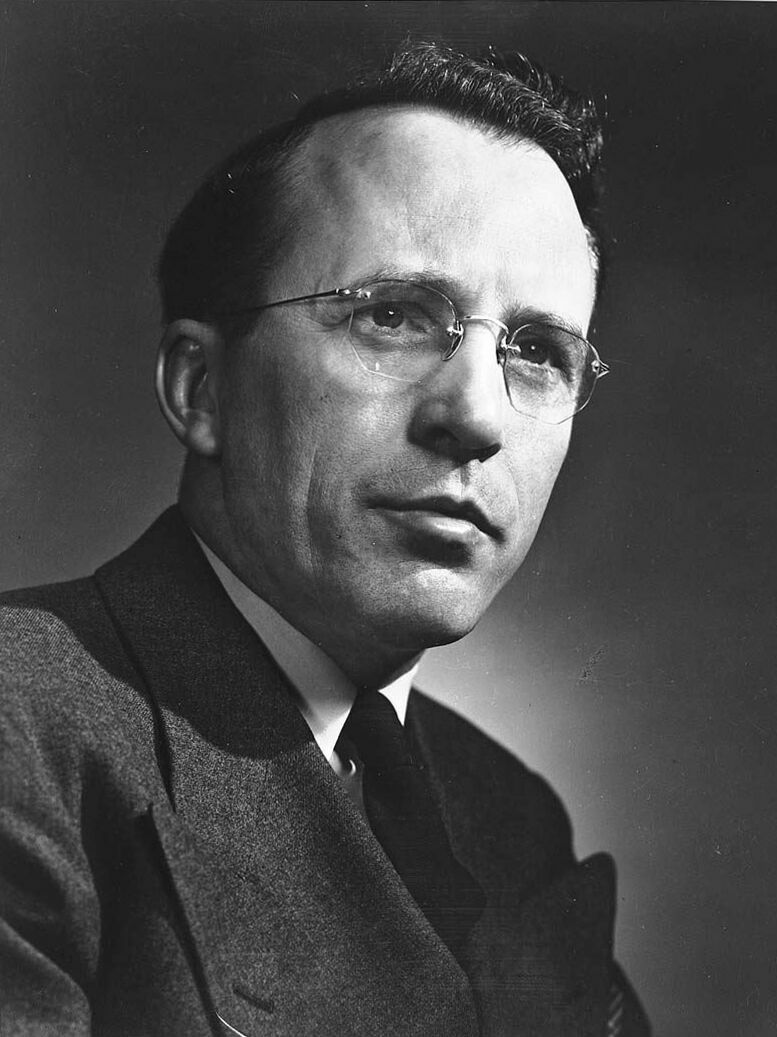
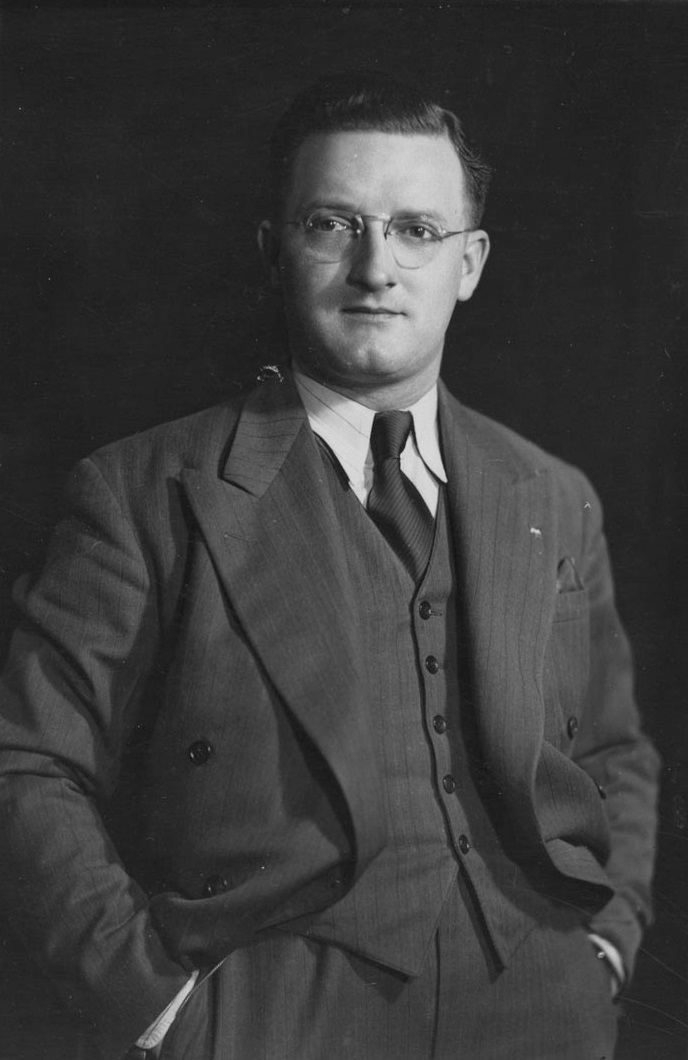
Party leaders and participants
Liberal leader, Pierre Trudeau	PC leader, Robert Stanfield
Pierre Trudeau, Liberal	Robert Stanfield, Prog. Conservative
Tommy Douglas, NDP	Réal Caouette, Ralliement créditiste

Present at Canada's first leaders debate, held on June 9, 1968, were Liberal leader and prime minister Pierre Trudeau, Progressive Conservative leader Robert Stanfield, New Democratic Party (NDP) leader Tommy Douglas and Réal Caouette of the Ralliement créditiste. Réal Caouette, speaking only in French, was present only during the latter of the part whilst Douglas and Stanfield only debated in English. Trudeau alternated between French and English.

Private network CTV originally proposed a 90-minute debate between only Trudeau and Stanfield, prompting the NDP to protest. Trudeau demanded that all leaders be included and that the debate be in both official languages. Ultimately, the debate was organized jointly by CTV and CBC/Radio-Canada as a two-hour event with Trudeau, Stanfield and Douglas debating for the 80 minutes, and Creditiste leader Caouette joining in for the final 40 minutes. Simultaneous translation was provided. Alexander Bell Patterson, leader of the rump Social Credit Party of Canada, was not included.

The debate was conducted in Parliament's Confederation Hall; moderators were Pierre Nadeau of Radio-Canada/CBC and Charles Templeton of CTV with questions from a panel of journalists made up of Ron Collister, Tom Gould, and Jean-Marc Poliquin.

Six years earlier, during the 1962 federal election, Liberal leader Lester Pearson had challenged Progressive Conservative prime minister John Diefenbaker to a televised debate but was turned down.

== 1979 debate ==
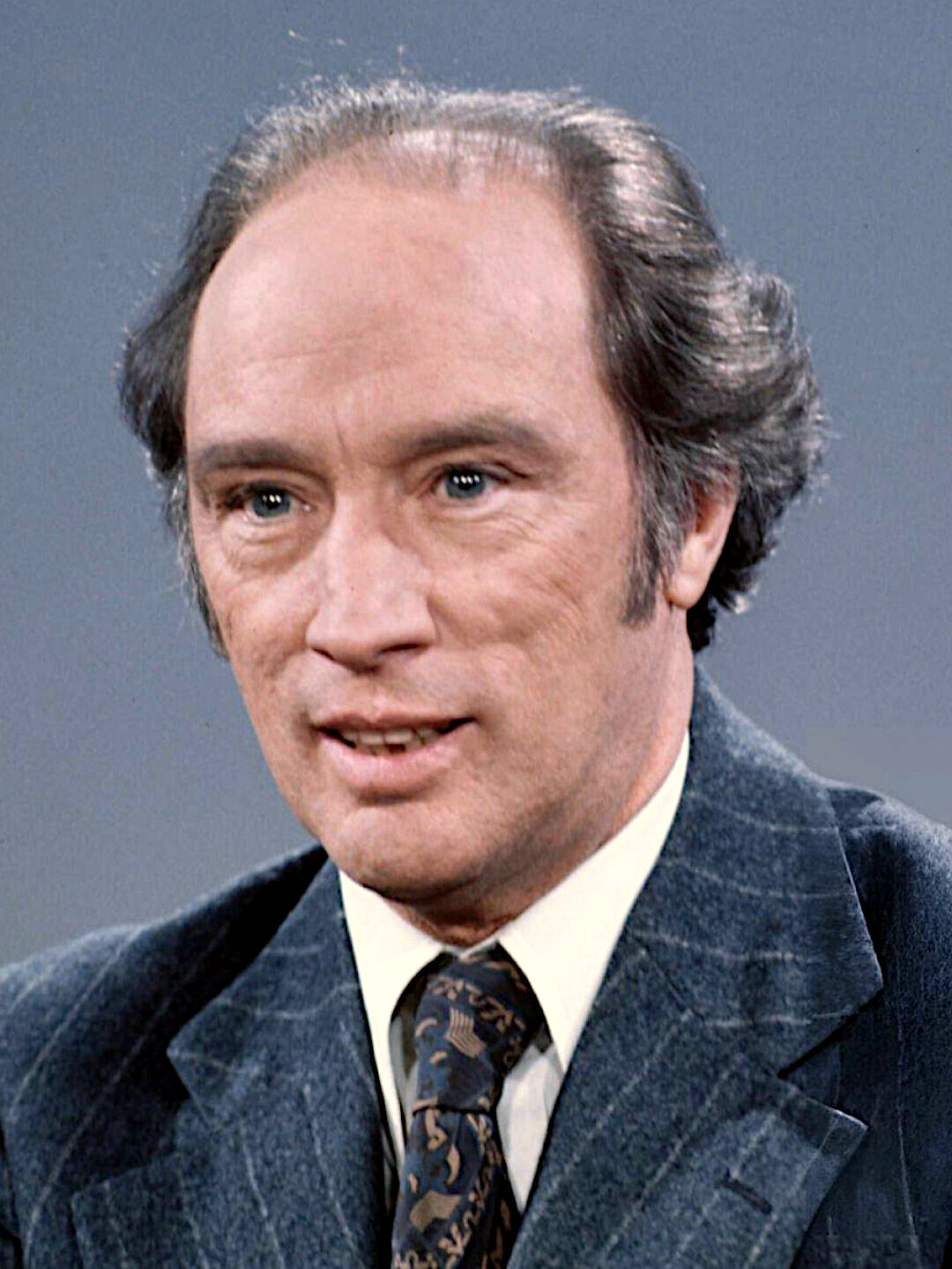
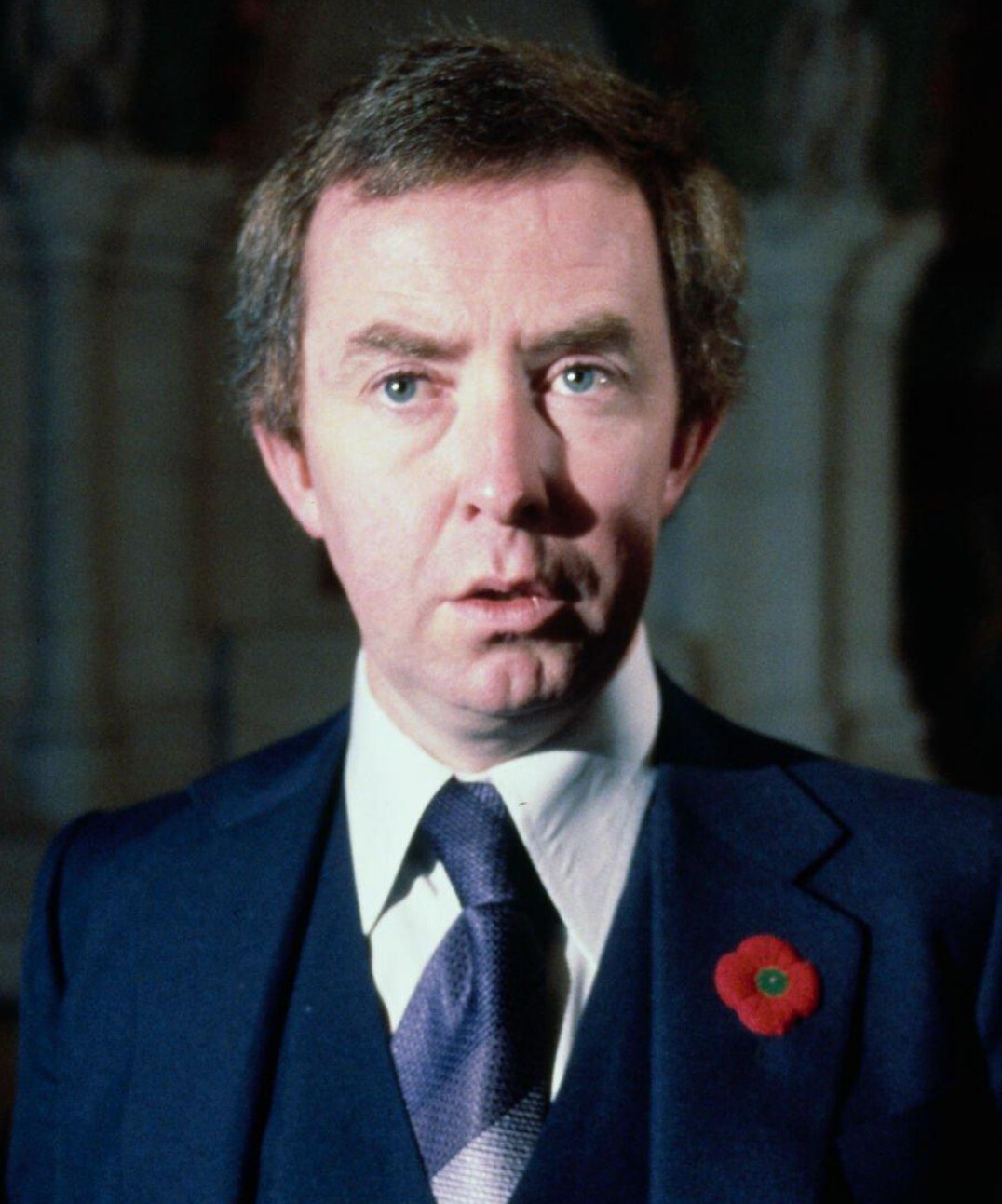
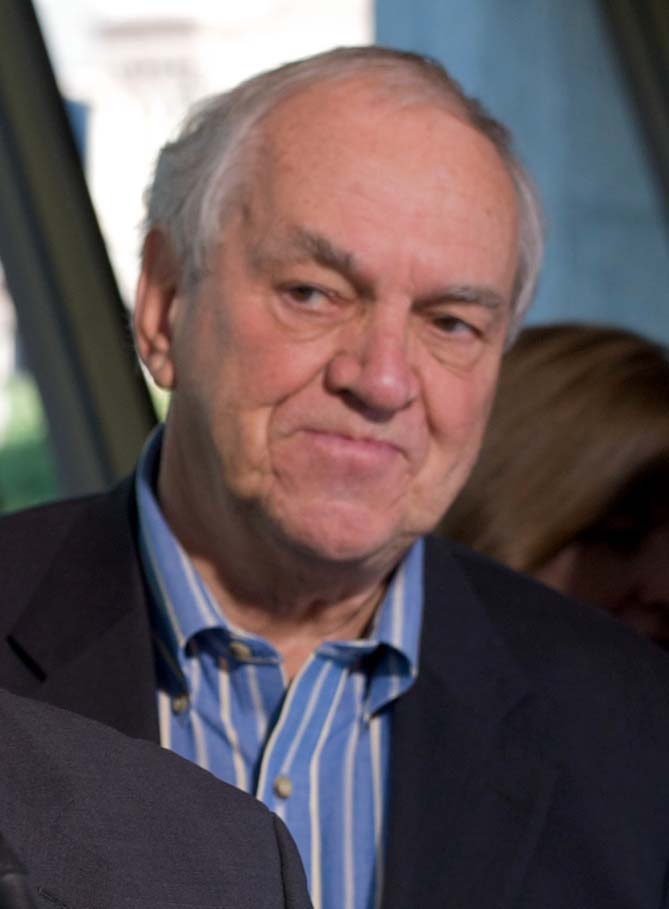
Party leaders and participants
Liberal leader, Pierre Trudeau	Progressive Conservative leader, Joe Clark
Pierre Trudeau, Liberal	Joe Clark, Prog. Conservative	Ed Broadbent, NDP

After an 11-year absence during which no debates were held during the 1972 and 1974 federal elections, there was one English-language debate conducted during the 1979 campaign, held in Ottawa by a broadcasting consortium consisting of CBC/Radio-Canada, CTV, Global Television Network, and TVA. The debate was moderated by then Dean of the Faculty of Law at the University of Western Ontario, and future Governor General, David Johnston.

The three participants were Liberal leader and incumbent prime minister Pierre Trudeau, Progressive Conservative leader Joe Clark, and NDP leader Ed Broadbent. Fabien Roy, leader of the Social Credit Party of Canada, was not invited to the debate even though the party had 9 sitting MPs at the time of the debate.

The two-hour long debate was conducted in Ottawa on May 13, 1979, in the studios of CJOH-TV and moderated by McGill University principal David Johnston, who would go on to become Governor General of Canada two decades later. Questions were asked by a panel of journalists consisting of the CBC's David Halton, Global Television's Peter Desbarats, and Bruce Phillips of CTV.

== 1984 debates ==
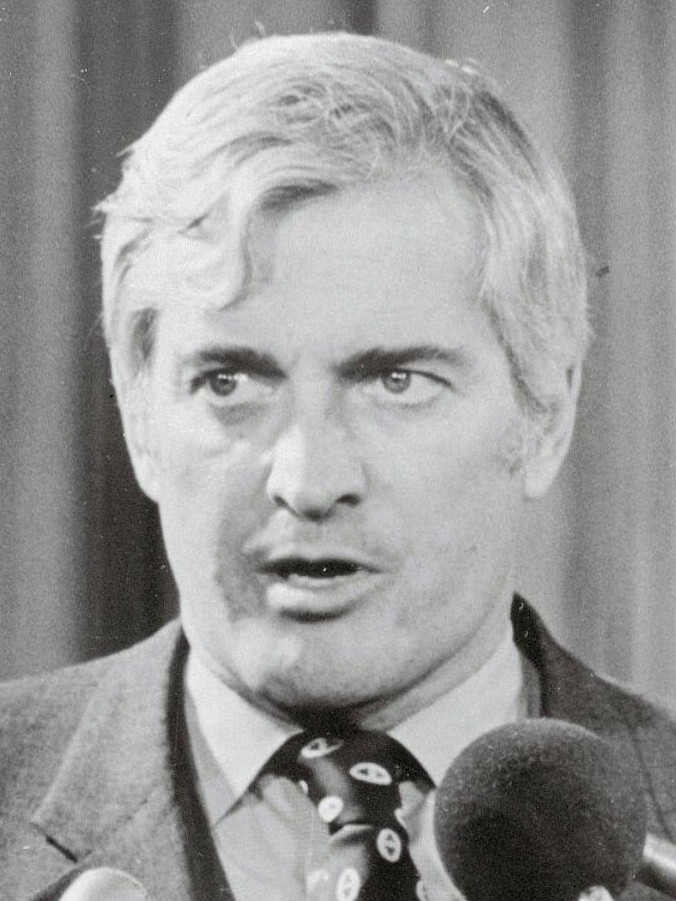
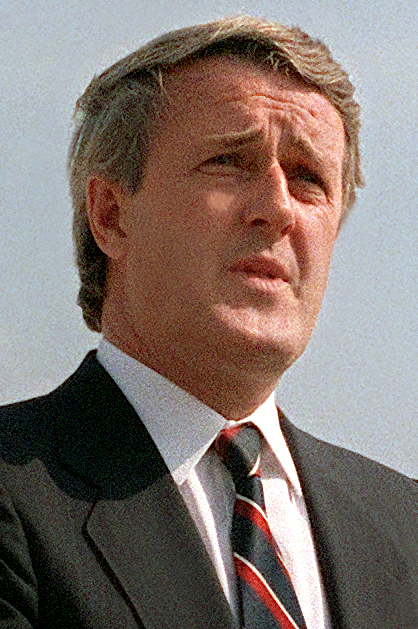
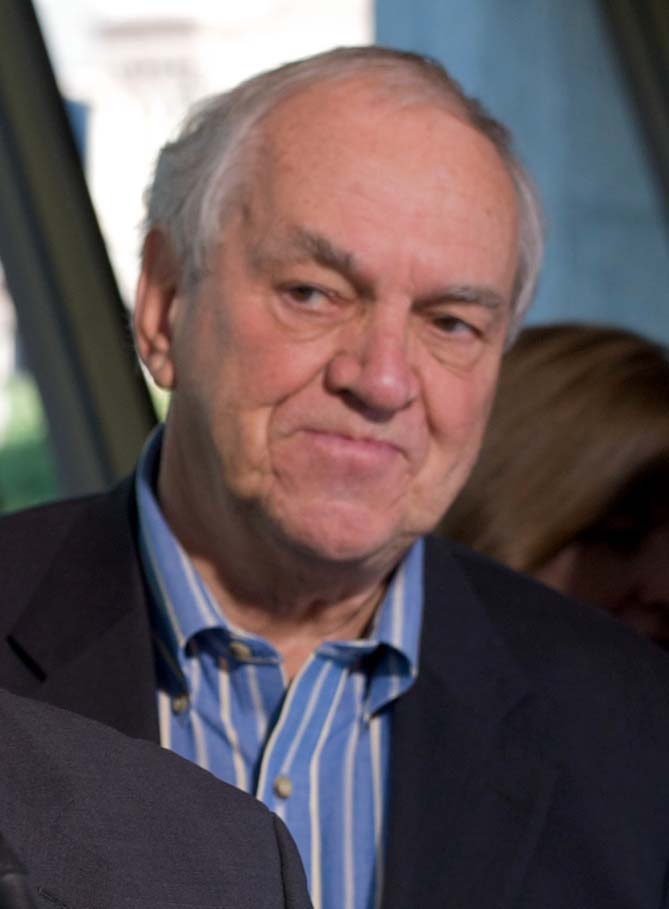
Party leaders and participants
	Progressive Conservative leader, Brian Mulroney
John Turner, Liberal	Brian Mulroney, Prog. Conservative	Ed Broadbent, NDP

Three debates were held in 1984, two organized by the broadcasting consortium (one each in English and French) and one on women's issues organized by the National Action Committee on the Status of Women. Leaders participating in the 1984 debates were Liberal leader and prime minister John Turner, Progressive Conservative leader Brian Mulroney, and NDP leader Ed Broadbent.

The most notable moment of the main English language debate was when Mulroney confronted Turner over his approval of patronage appointees by the outgoing prime minister, Trudeau in which Mulroney scolded Turner, telling him "You had an option, sir. You could have said, 'I am not going to do it. This is wrong for Canada, and I am not going to ask Canadians to pay the price.' You had an option, sir — to say 'no' — and you chose to say 'yes' to the old attitudes and the old stories of the Liberal Party. That sir, if I may say respectfully, that is not good enough for Canadians.. " The Progressive Conservatives won a landslide majority, leaving the Liberals nearly tied for second place with the NDP.

The broadcast consortium's French-language debate was held on July 24, 1984 and the two-hour English-language debate was held the next day. Both debates were held in Ottawa and conducted in the studios of CJOH-TV. The moderator for the English debate was McGill principal David Johnston, who also moderated the 1979 debate. Questions were asked by a panel of journalists consisting of the CBC's David Halton, Global's Peter Truman, and CTV's Bruce Phillips.

The Leaders' debate on women's issues during the 1984 Canadian federal election campaign was held on August 15, 1984 at the Royal York Hotel in Toronto. Panellists were Eleanor Wachtel, a Vancouver freelance writer, Kay Sigurjonsson, an NAC founding member and director of the Federation of Women Teachers' Associations of Ontario, Francine Harel-Giasson, a professor at the University of Montreal business school, and Renée Rowan, columnist for Le Devoir, and the moderator of the debate was Caroline Andrew, chairman of the political science department at the University of Ottawa. The debate was jointly broadcast by four TV networks: CBC, Radio-Canada, CTV and Global.

== 1988 debates ==
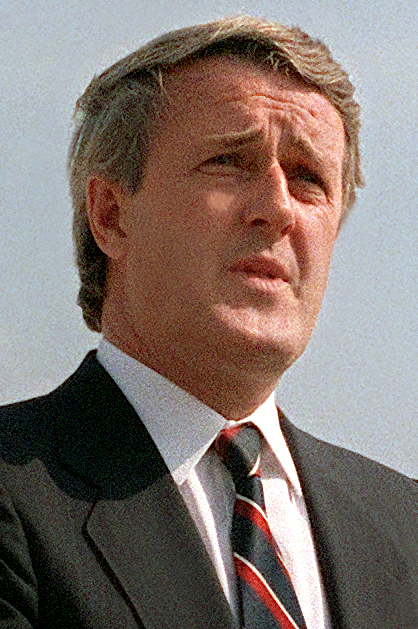
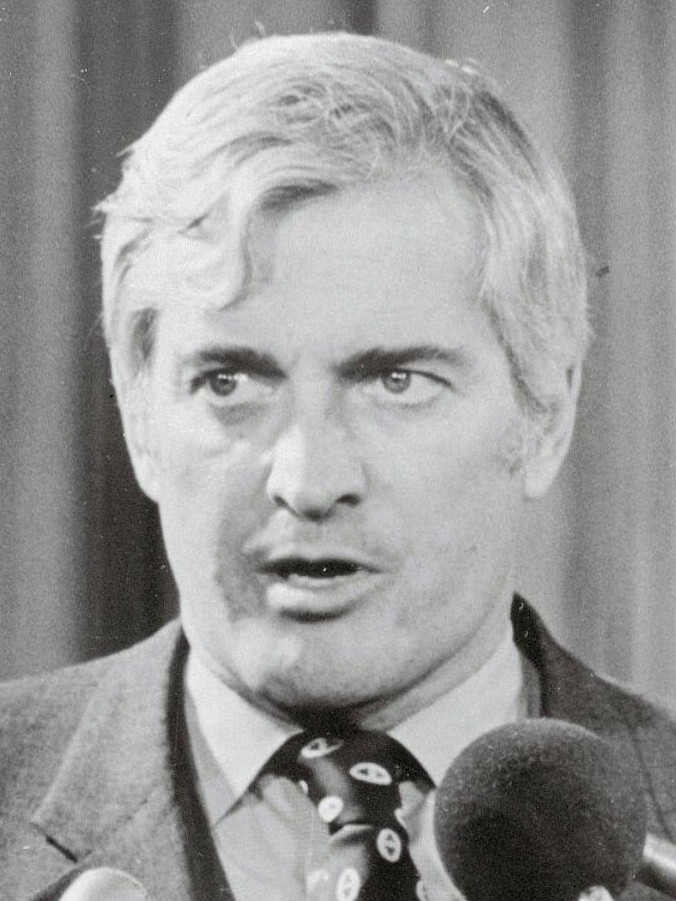
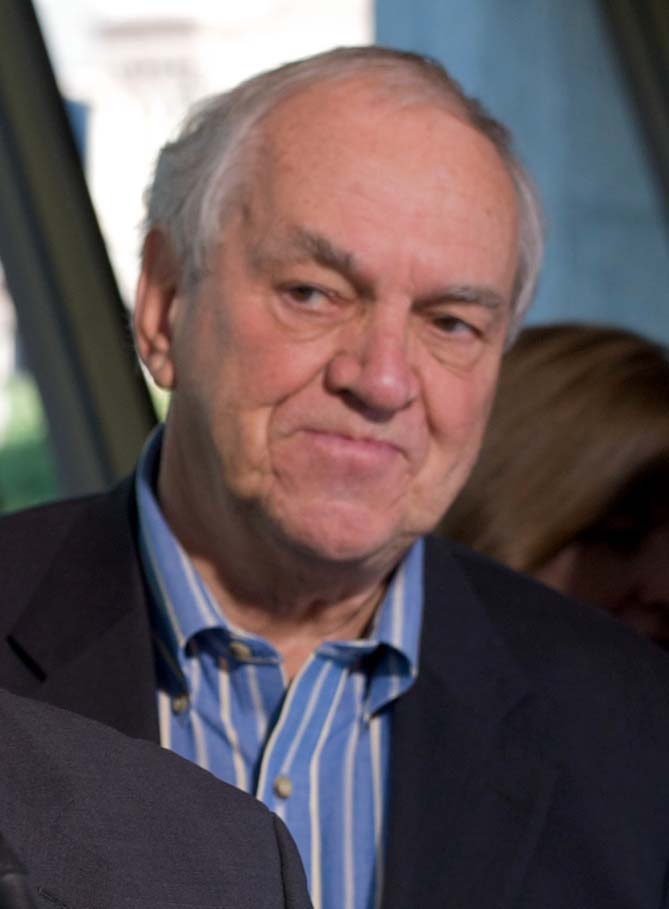
Party leaders and participants
Progressive Conservative leader, Brian Mulroney
Brian Mulroney, Prog. Conservative	John Turner, Liberal	Ed Broadbent, NDP

The leaders participating were Progressive Conservative leader and prime minister Brian Mulroney, Liberal leader John Turner and NDP leader Ed Broadbent.

Debates were held by the consortium in English and French. The three-hour French debate occurred on October 24, 1988, and the three-hour English debate was conducted in Ottawa on October 25, 1988, and was moderated by Rosalie Abella. In the English debate, questions were asked by a panel of journalists made up of the CBC's David Halton, CTV's Pamela Wallin, and Global's Doug Small.

Mulroney's government was re-elected with a reduced majority.

== 1993 debates ==
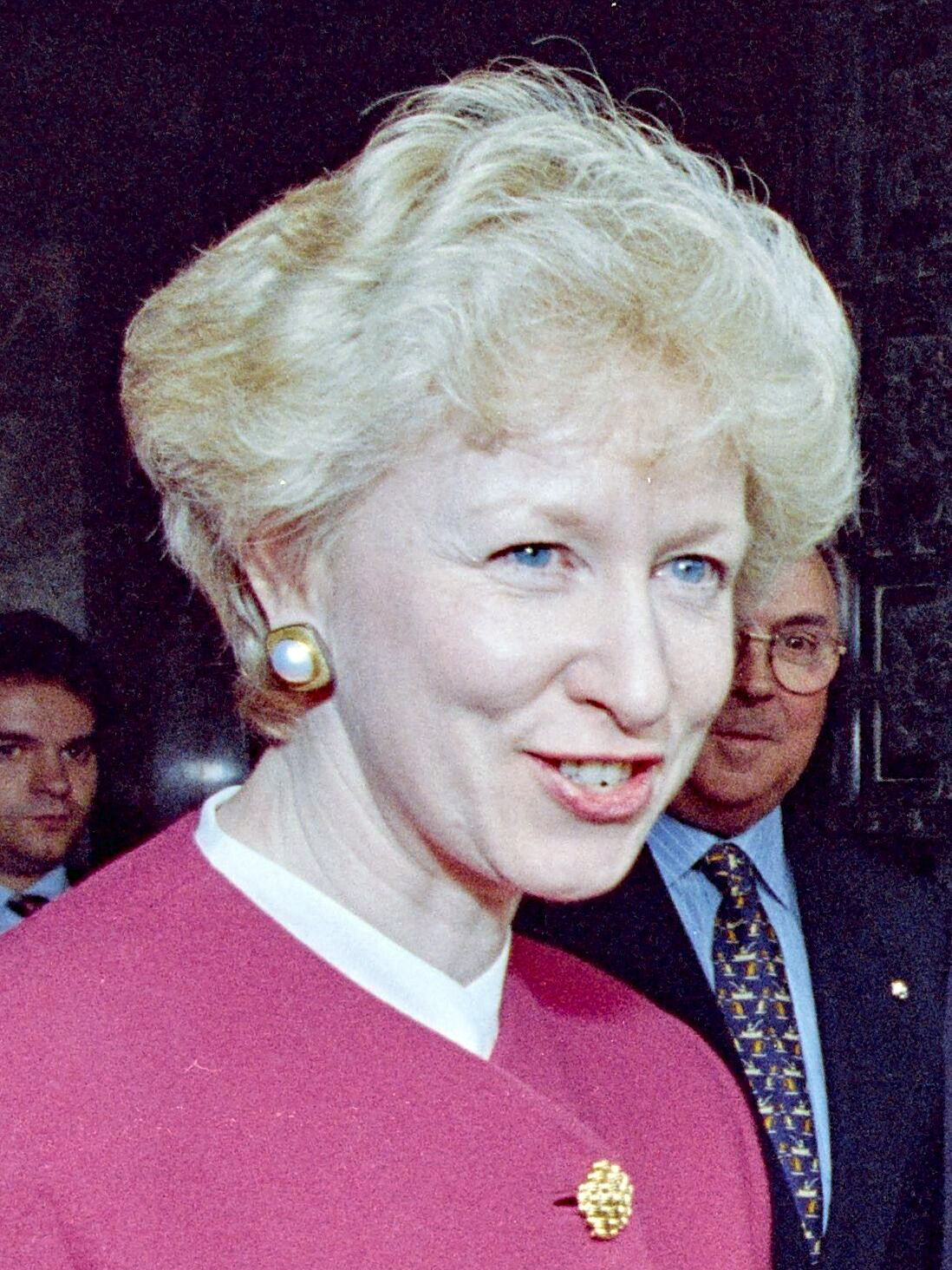
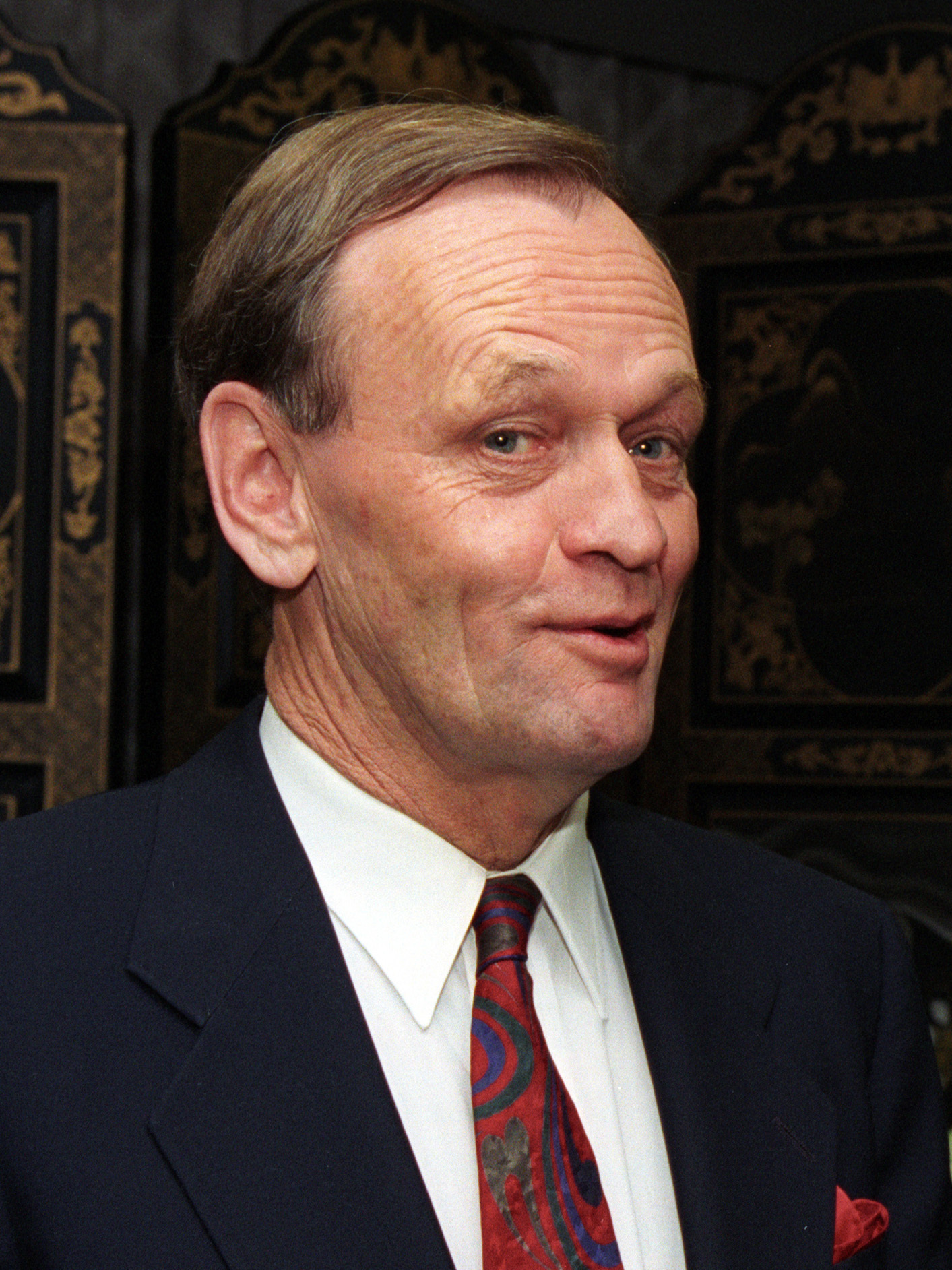
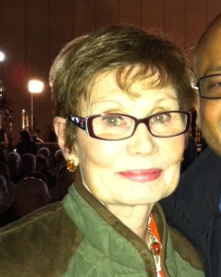
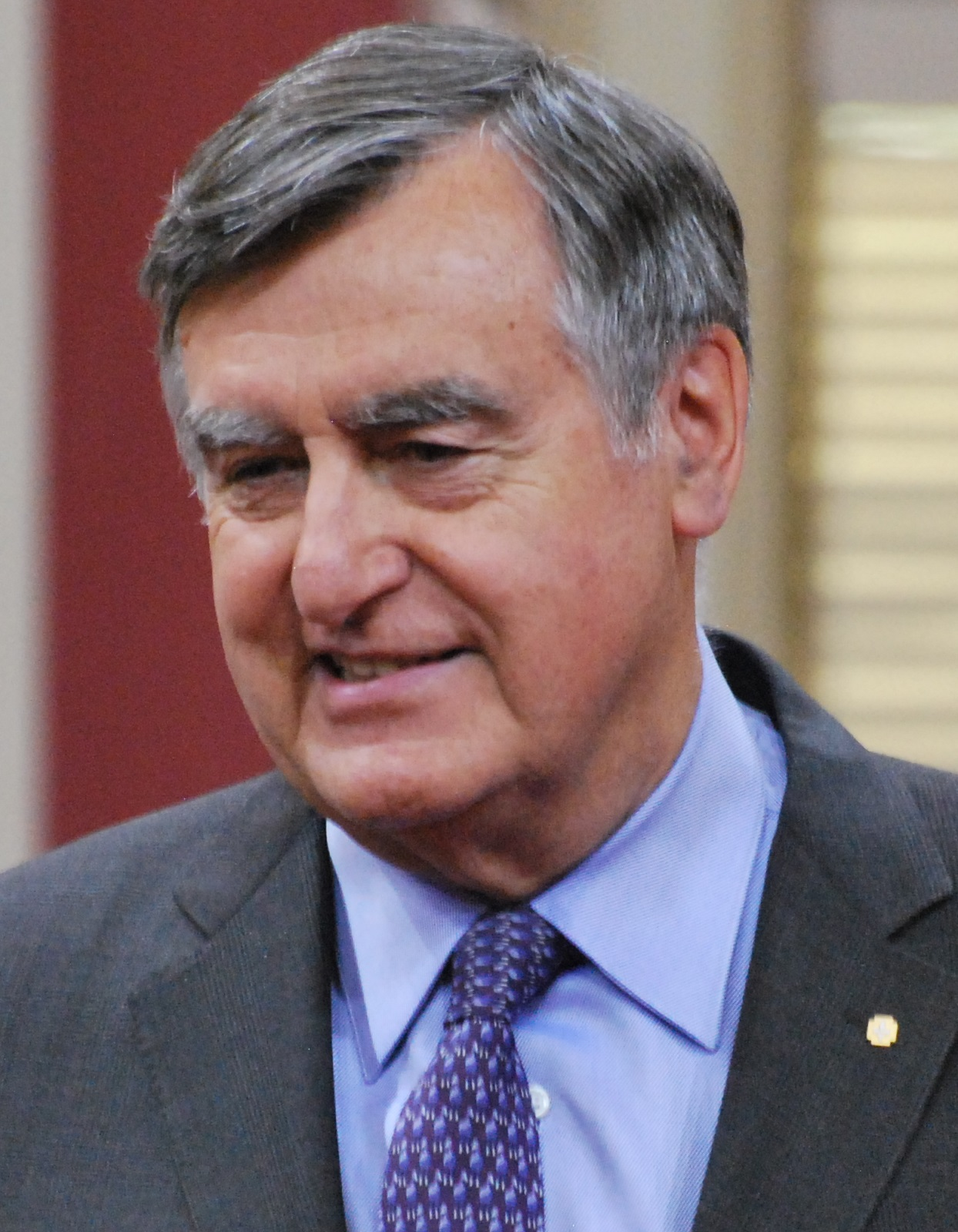
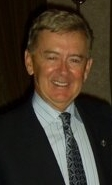
Party leaders and participants
Progressive Conservative leader, Kim Campbell	Liberal leader, Jean Chretien
Kim Campbell, Prog. Conservative	Jean Chrétien, Liberal	Audrey McLaughlin, NDP
Bloc Quebecois leader, Lucien Bouchard		Reform Party leader, Preston Manning
Lucien Bouchard, Bloc Québécois		Preston Manning, Reform

The leaders participating were Progressive Conservative leader, and prime minister, Kim Campbell, Liberal leader Jean Chrétien, NDP leader Audrey McLaughlin, Bloc Québécois leader Lucien Bouchard and Reform Party leader Preston Manning. The governing PCs were reduced to two seats, while the NDP won nine seats. The Bloc Québécois formed the official opposition, while the Reform Party emerged as Canada's main conservative movement.

== 1997 debates ==
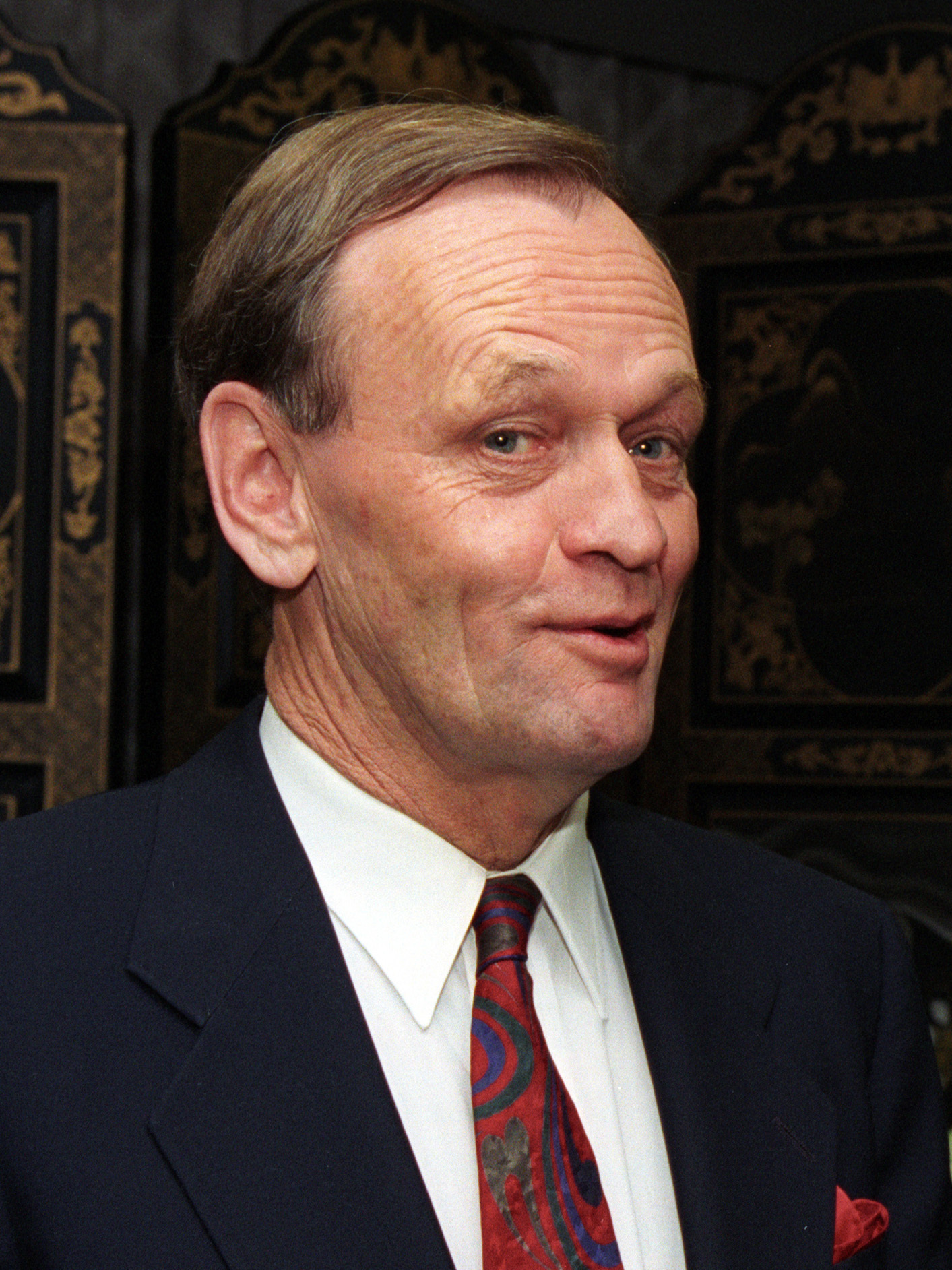
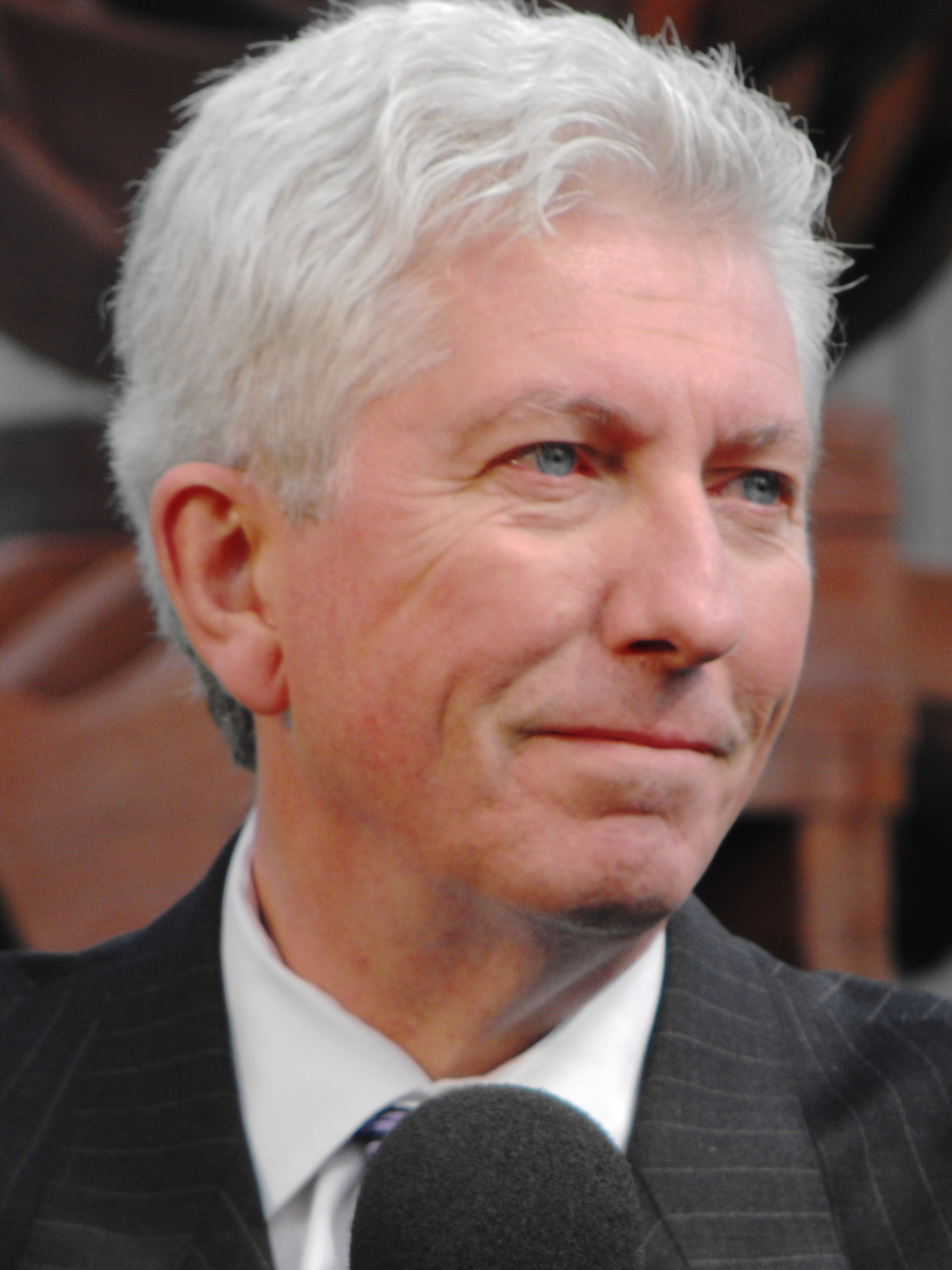
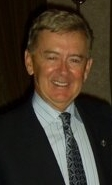
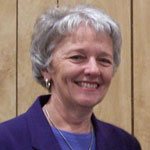
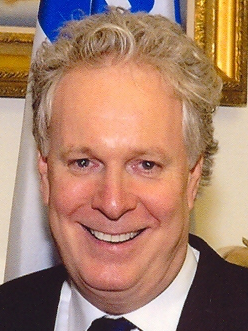
Party leaders and participants
Liberal leader, Jean Chrétien	Bloc Quebecois leader, Gilles Duceppe	Reform Party leader, Preston Manning
Jean Chrétien, Liberal	Gilles Duceppe, Bloc Québécois	Preston Manning, Reform
		Progressive Conservative leader, Jean Charest
Alexa McDonough, NDP		Jean Charest, Prog. Conservative

The leaders participating were Liberal leader and prime minister Jean Chrétien, Bloc Québécois leader Gilles Duceppe, Reform Party leader Preston Manning, NDP leader Alexa McDonough and Progressive Conservative leader Jean Charest. The Liberals were re-elected with a reduced majority, the Reform Party replaced the Bloc as official opposition, while the NDP and PCs made significant gains (for the NDP in the Atlantic provinces and the PCs in Quebec) but remained fourth and fifth place respectively.

== 2000 debates ==
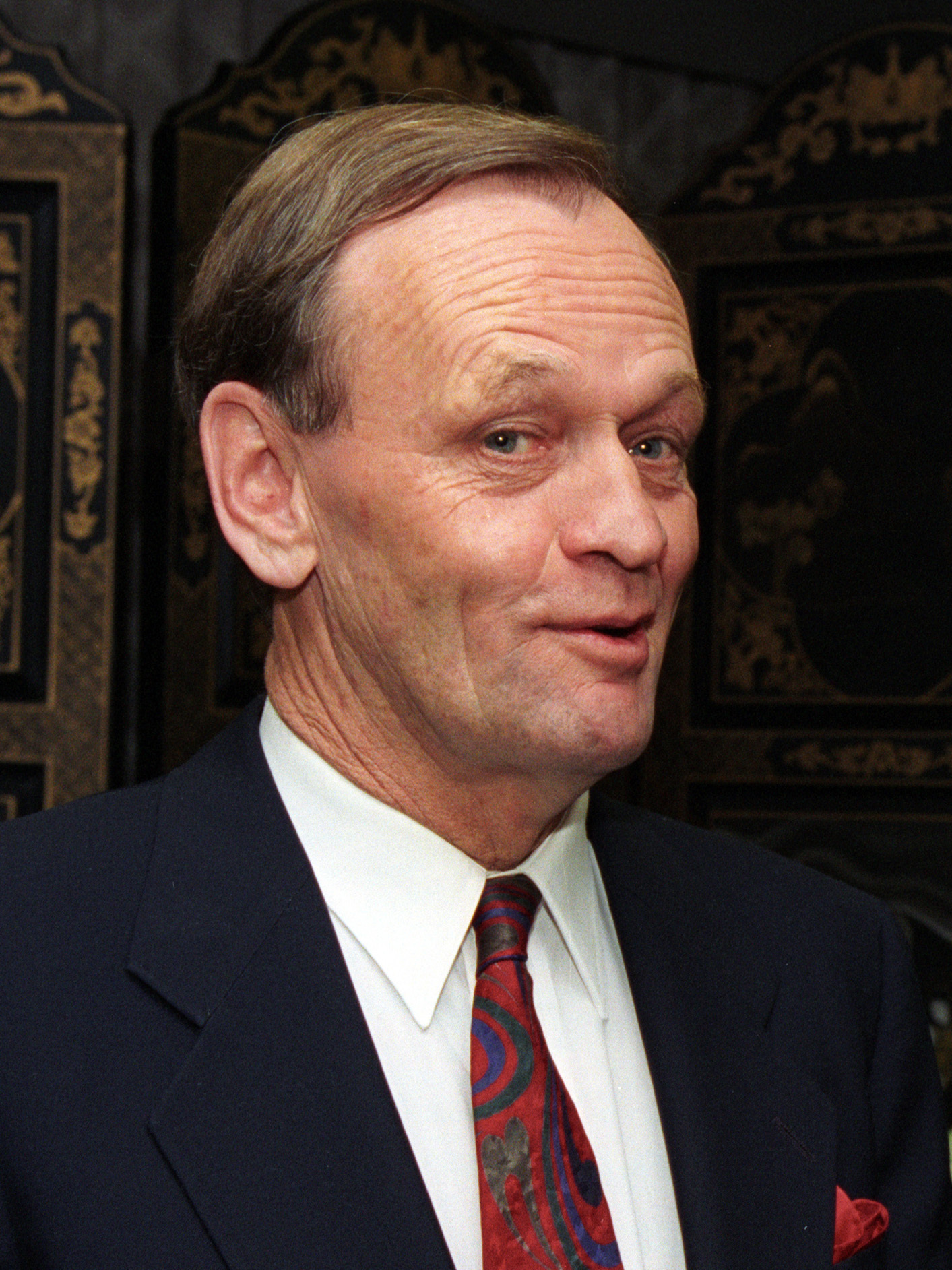
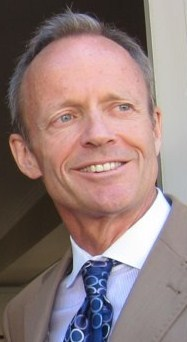
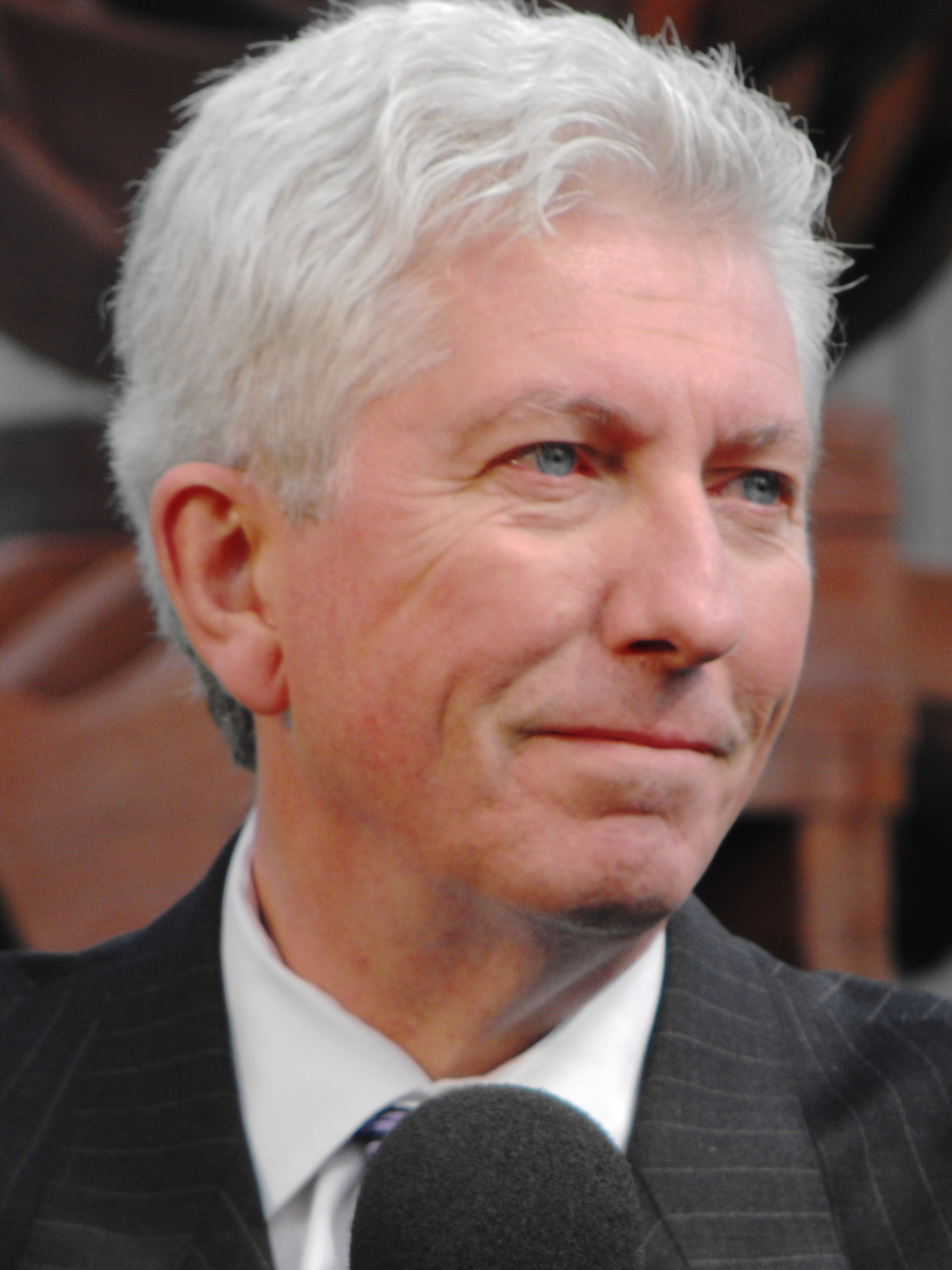
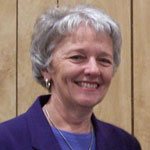
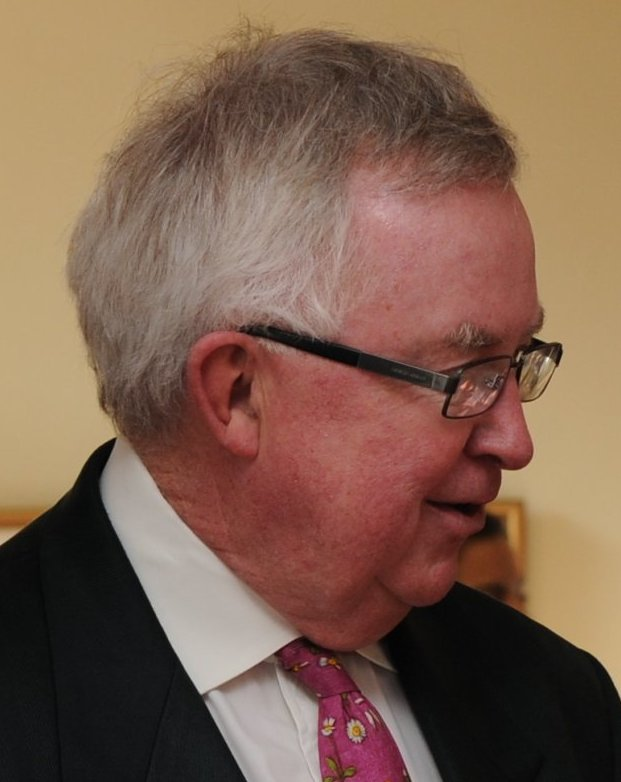
Party leaders and participants
Liberal leader, Jean Chrétien	Canadian Alliance leader, Stockwell Day	Bloc Quebecois leader, Gilles Duceppe
Jean Chrétien, Liberal	Stockwell Day, Canadian Alliance	Gilles Duceppe, Bloc Québécois
Alexa McDonough, NDP		Joe Clark, Prog. Conservative

The leaders participating were Liberal leader and prime minister Jean Chrétien, Canadian Alliance leader Stockwell Day, Bloc Québécois leader Gilles Duceppe, NDP leader Alexa McDonough and Progressive Conservative leader Joe Clark. The Liberals were re-elected with an enlarged majority, the Canadian Alliance (formed by the Reform Party and some PC Party members) failed to make gains outside of the West, while the Bloc Québécois, NDP and PCs all experienced a relative decline.

== 2004 debates ==
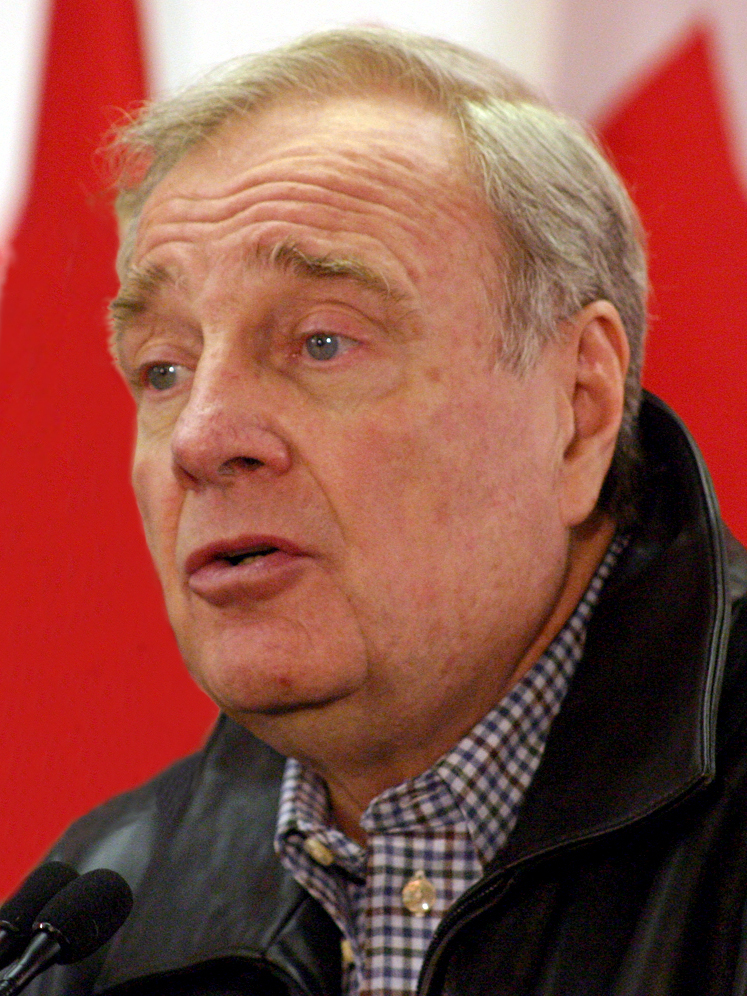
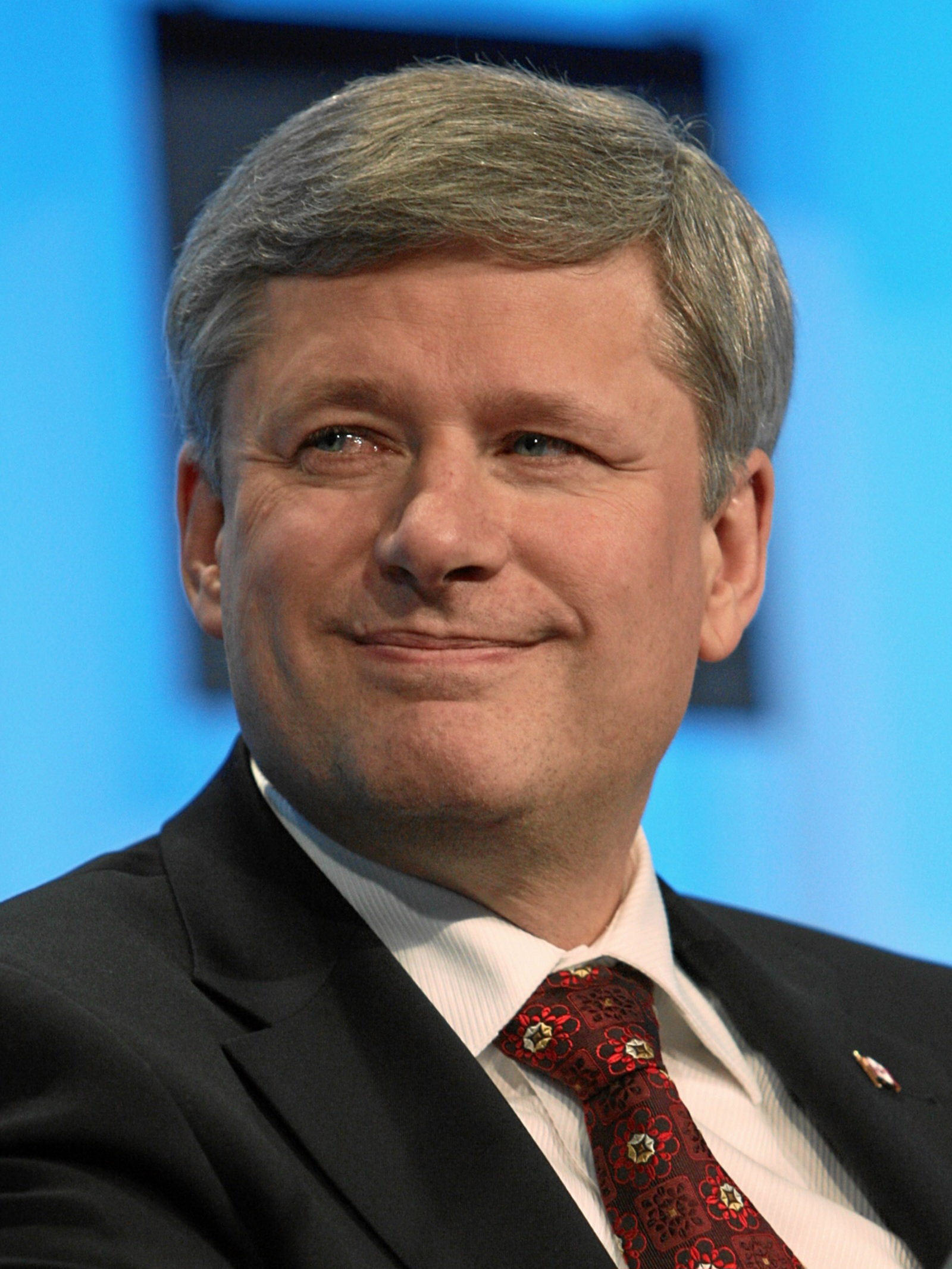
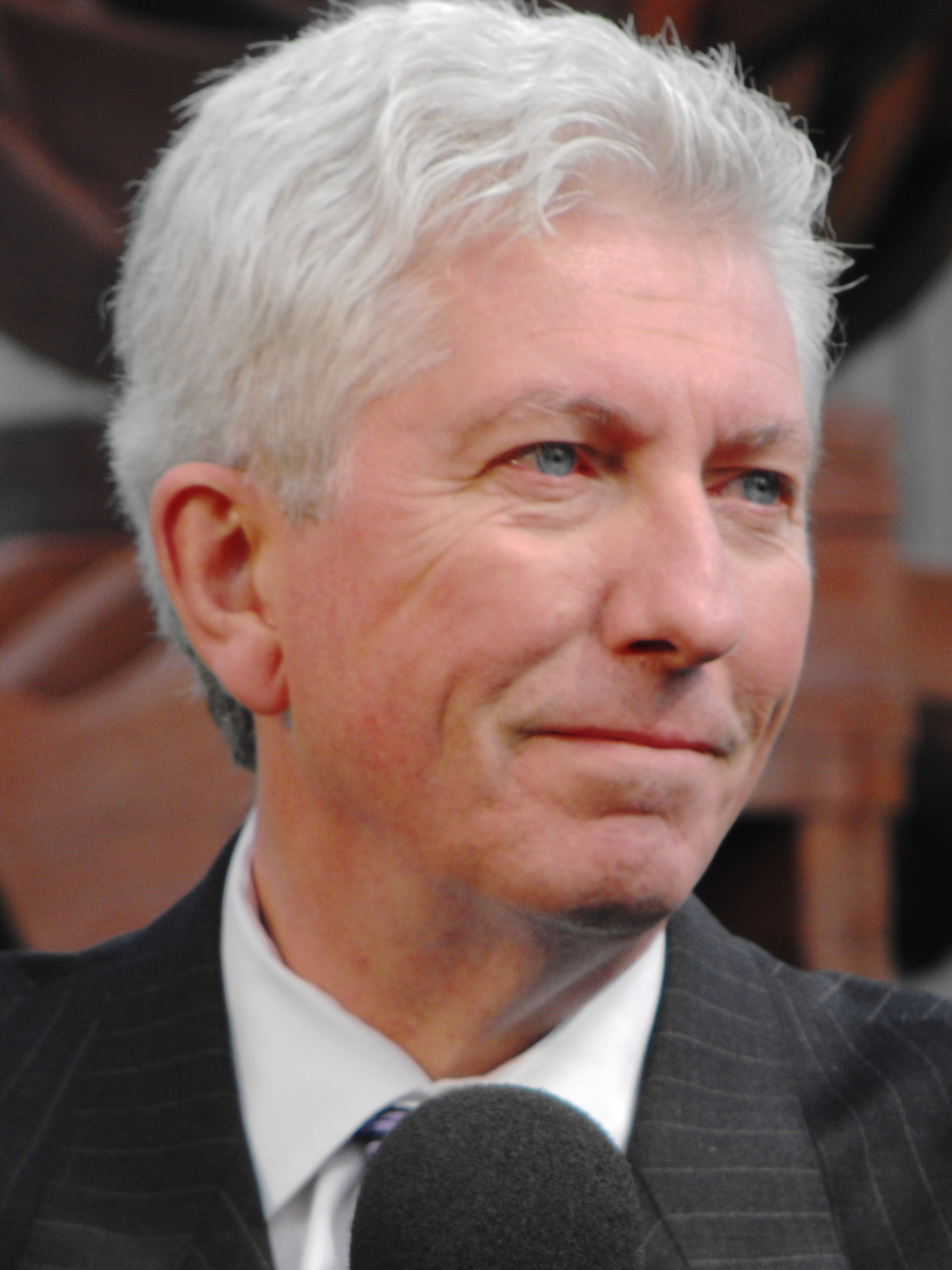
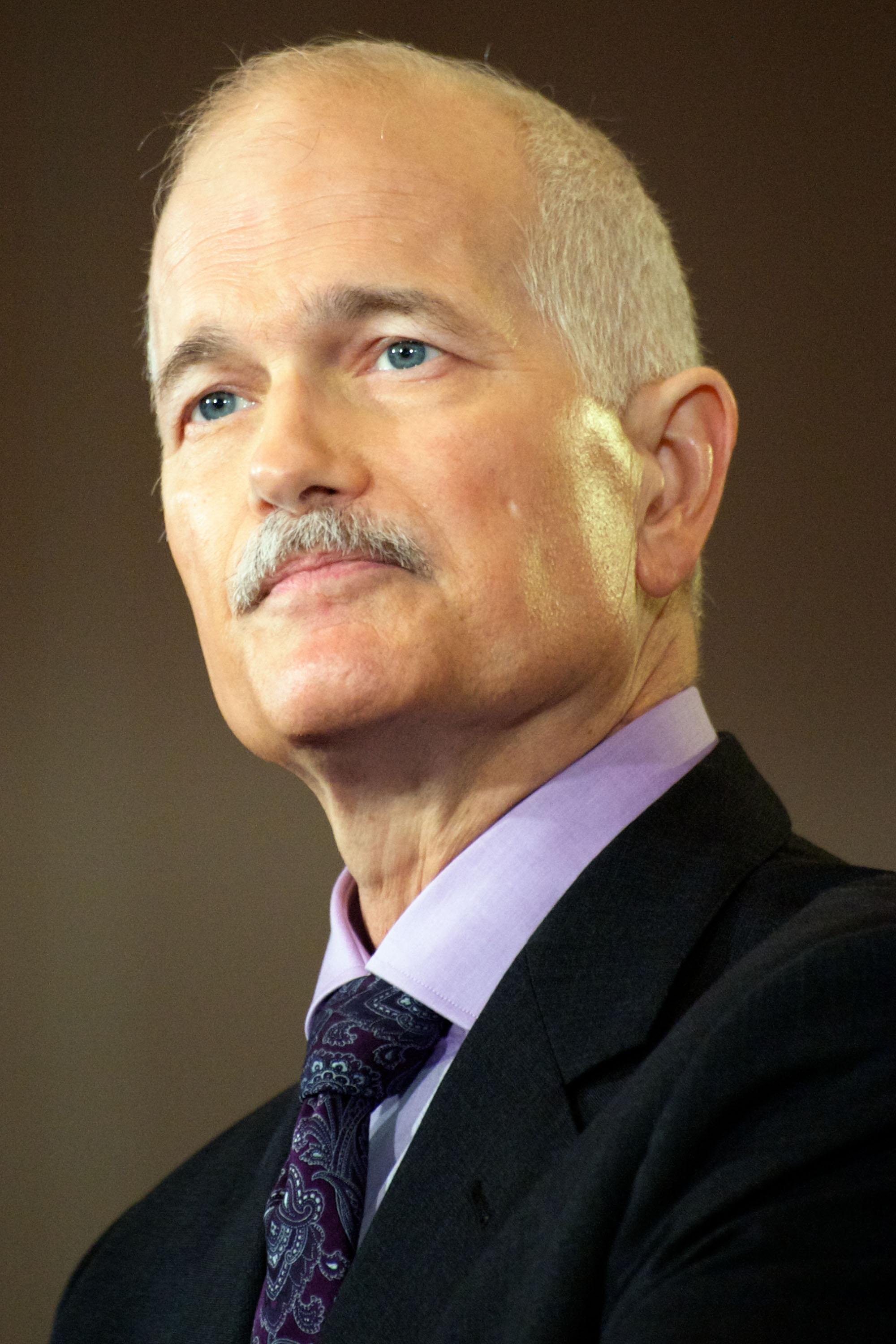
Party leaders and participants
Liberal leader, Paul Martin	Conservative leader, Stephen Harper
Paul Martin, Liberal	Stephen Harper, Conservative
Gilles Duceppe, Bloc Québécois	Jack Layton, NDP

The leaders participating were Liberal leader and prime minister Paul Martin, Conservative Party leader Stephen Harper, Bloc Quebecois leader Gilles Duceppe, and NDP leader Jack Layton.

The Liberals were re-elected with a minority, while the Conservative Party (formed by an Alliance-PC merger) made gains in Ontario. A rejuvenated NDP also made gains in Ontario, and a rejuvenated Bloc Quebecois made gains in Québec.

== 2005–2006 debates ==
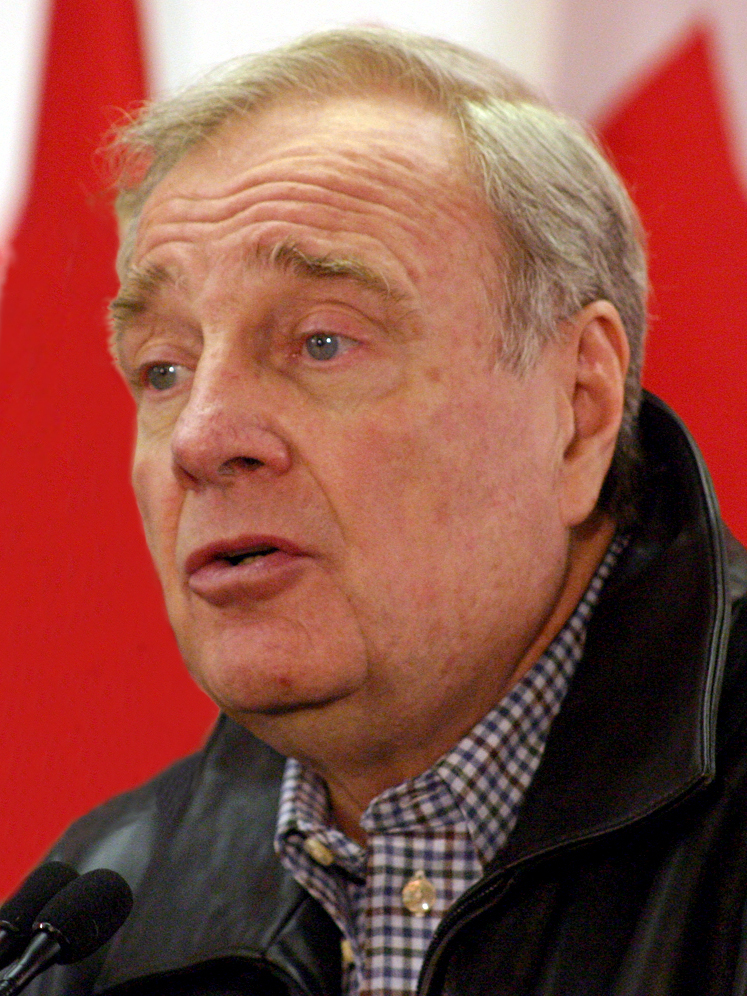
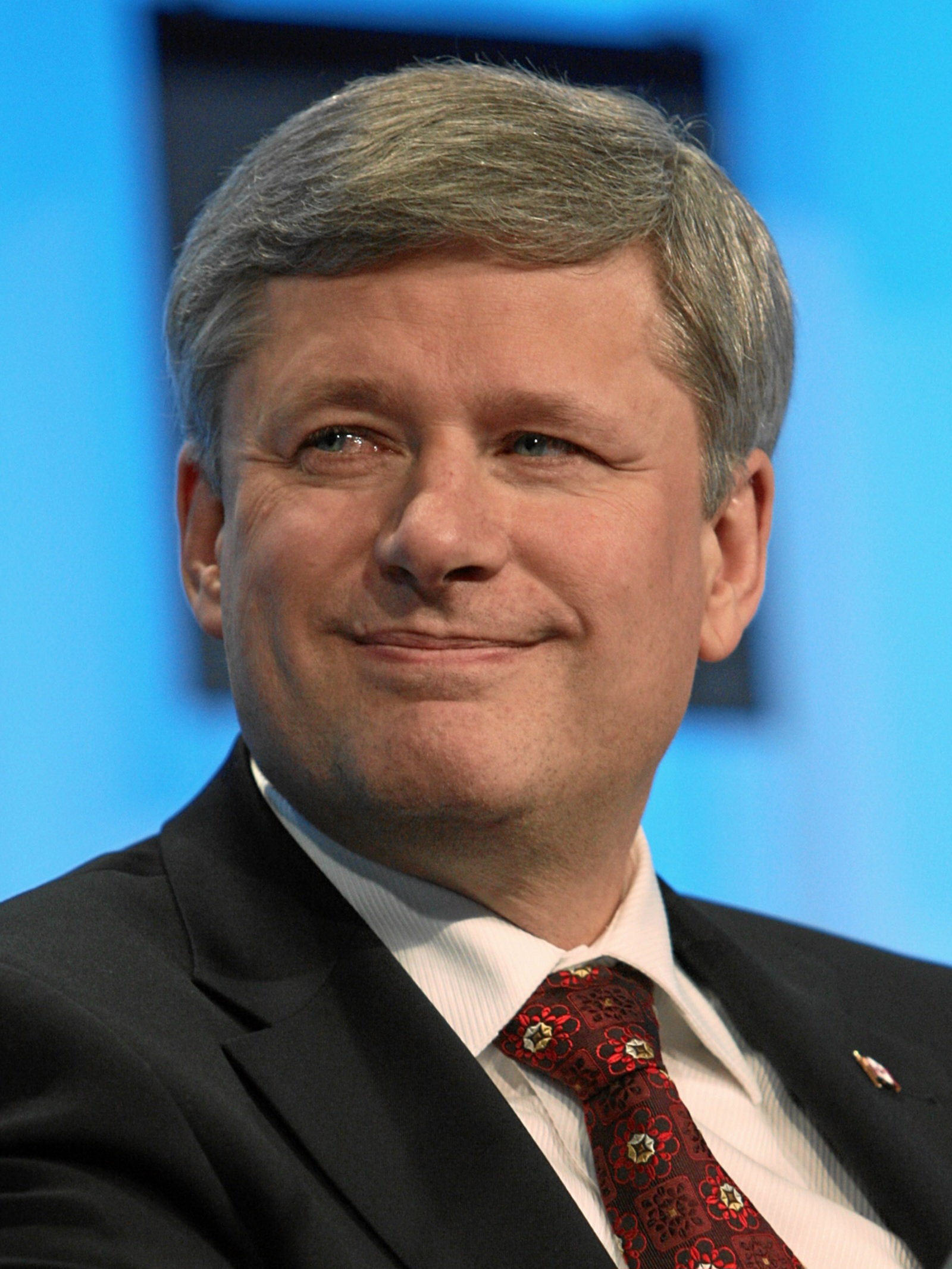
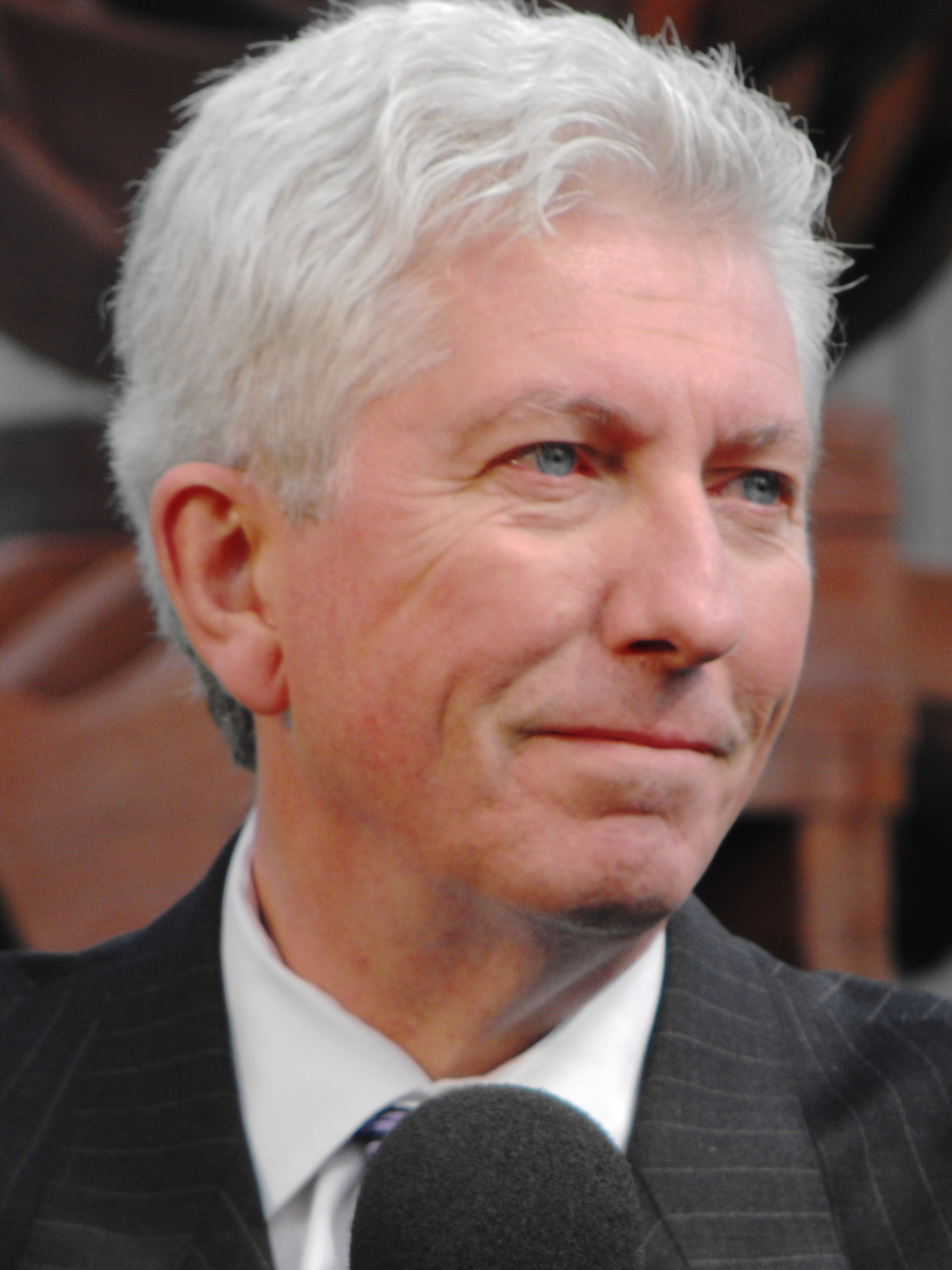
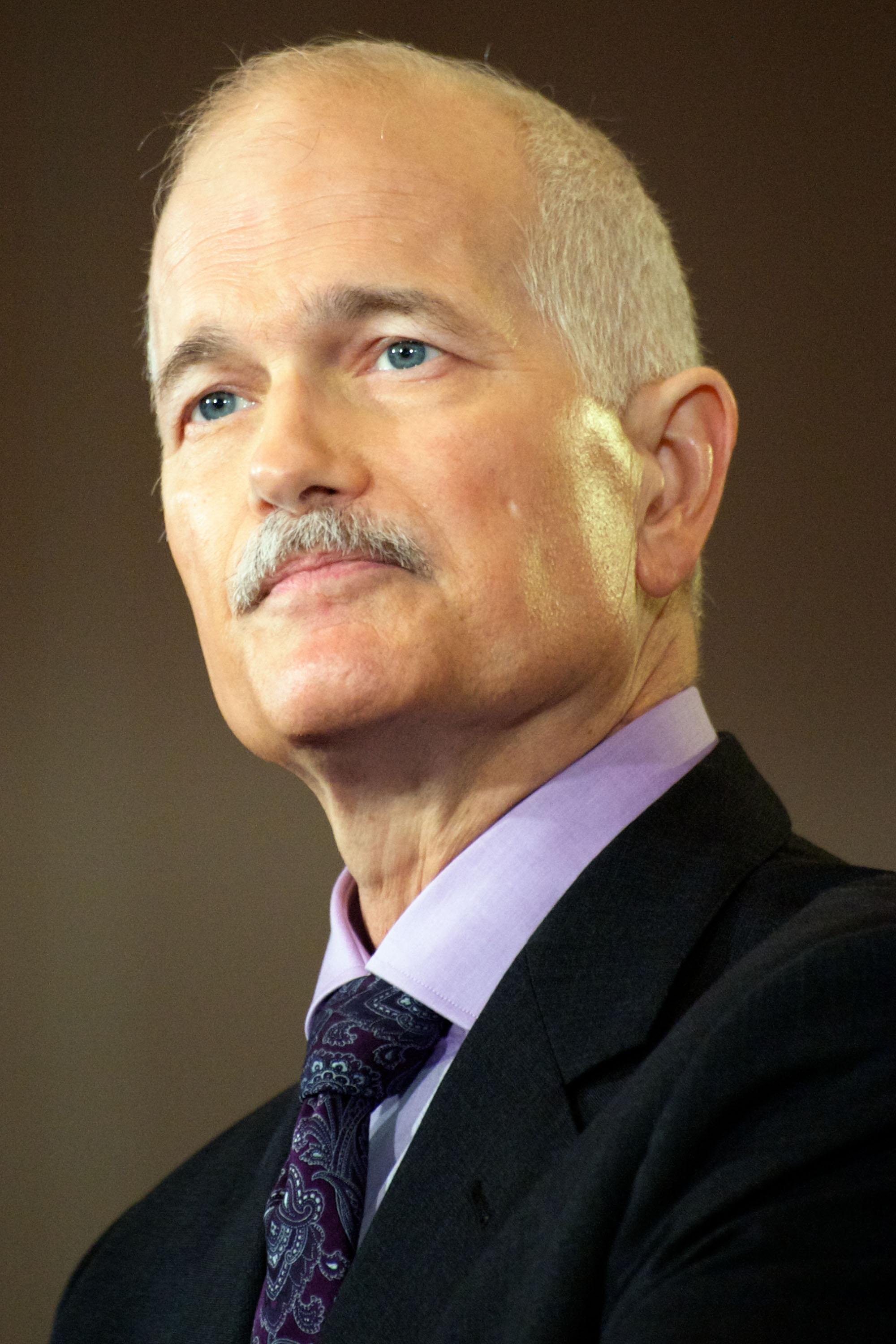
Party leaders and participants
Liberal leader, Paul Martin	Conservative leader, Stephen Harper
Paul Martin, Liberal	Stephen Harper, Conservative
Gilles Duceppe, Bloc Québécois	Jack Layton, NDP

There were four debates for the 2006 election. The first two were held in Vancouver. The French-language debate was on Thursday, December 15, 2005, followed the next day by the English debate. The English debate was moderated by Trina McQueen, who was president and COO of CTVGlobemedia from 2000 to 2002. The final debates were scheduled for Gatineau and Montréal, the English-language debate on Monday, January 9, the French-language debate on January 10.

The four participants were Liberal leader and incumbent prime minister Paul Martin, Conservative leader Stephen Harper, NDP leader Jack Layton, and Bloc Québécois leader Gilles Duceppe.

The Conservatives were elected with a minority government, while the Liberals became official opposition. Bloc Québécois support remained mostly stagnant, while the NDP made modest gains.

== 2008 debates ==
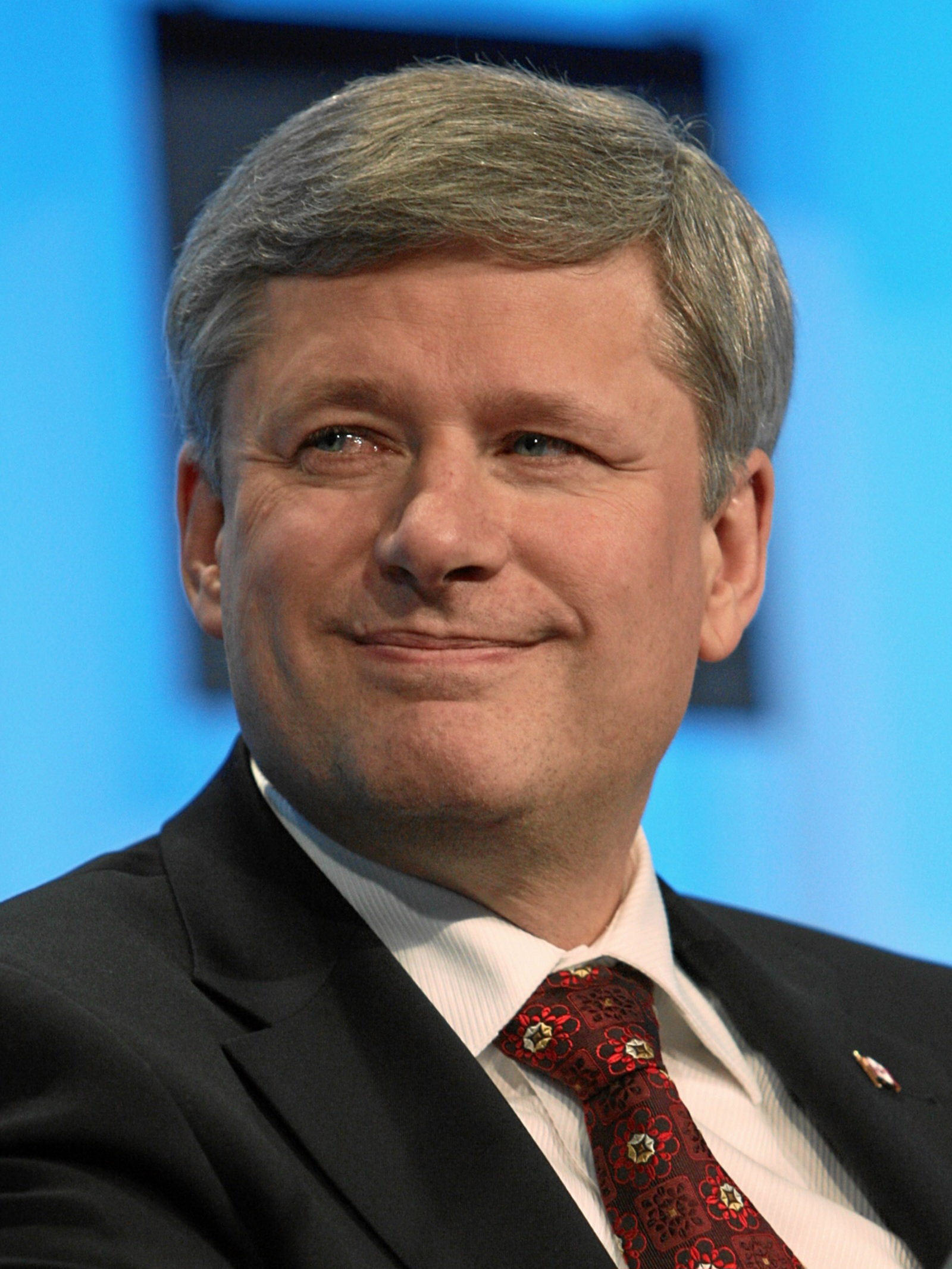
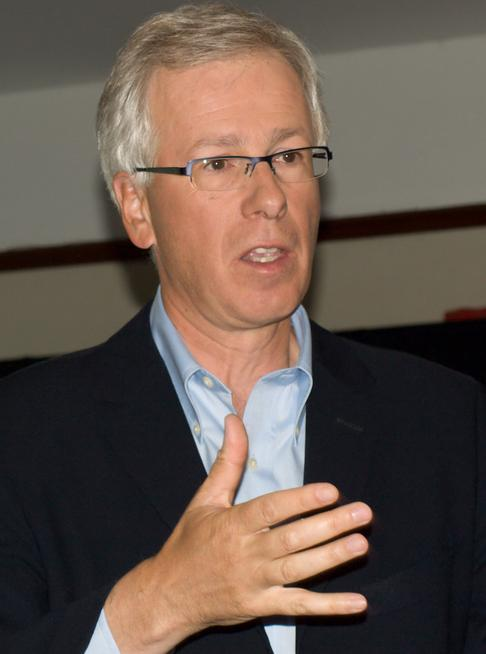
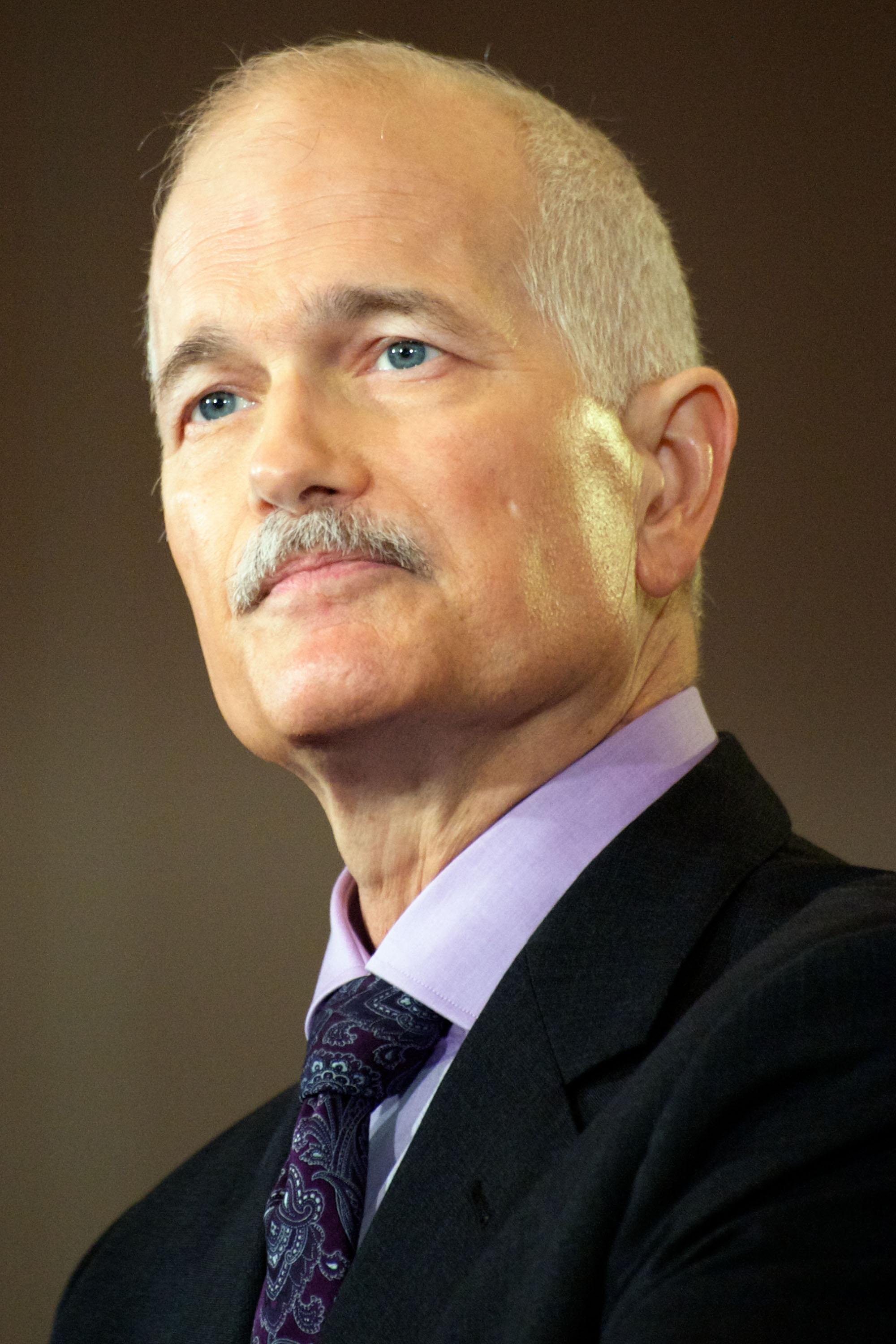
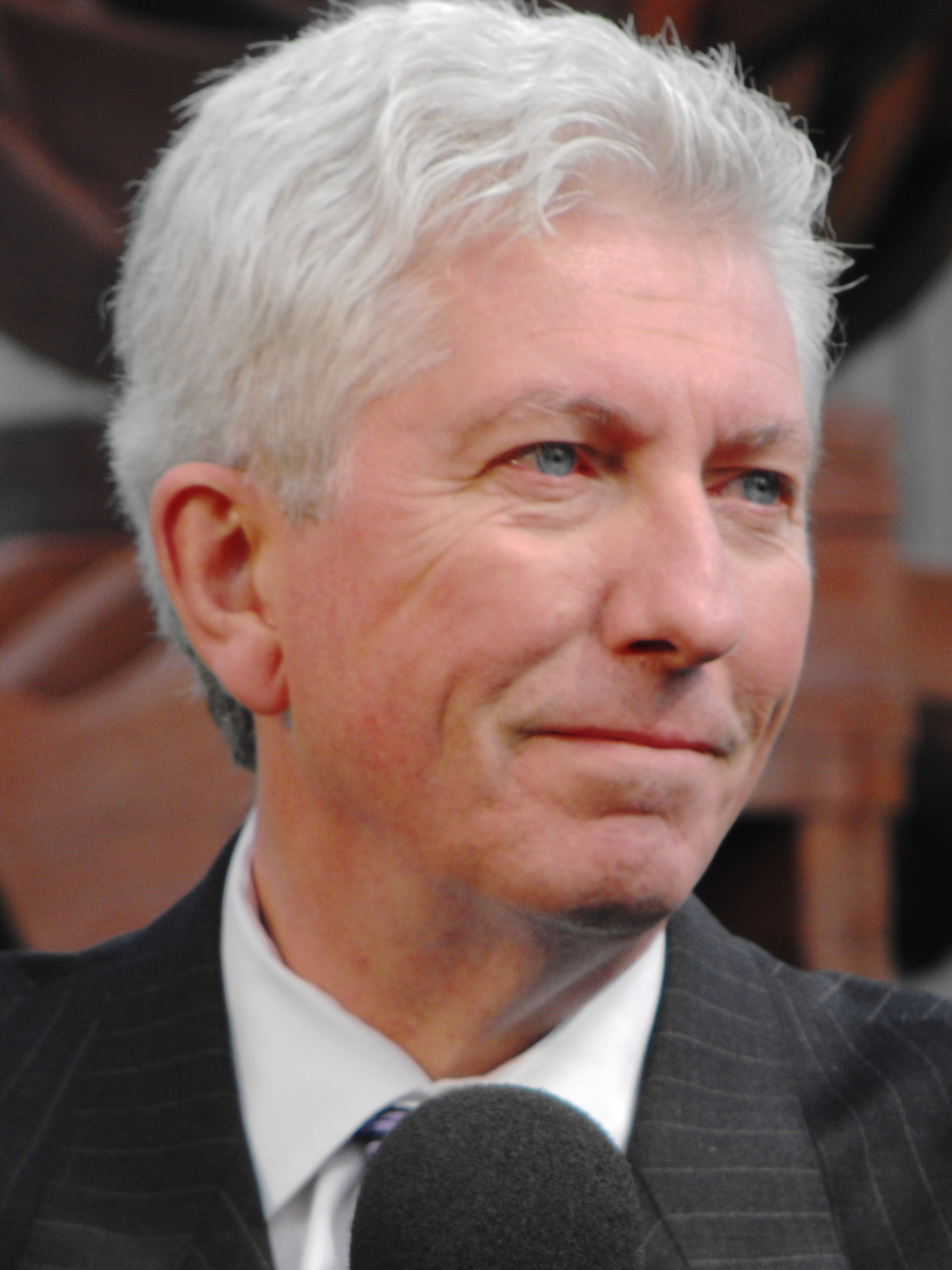
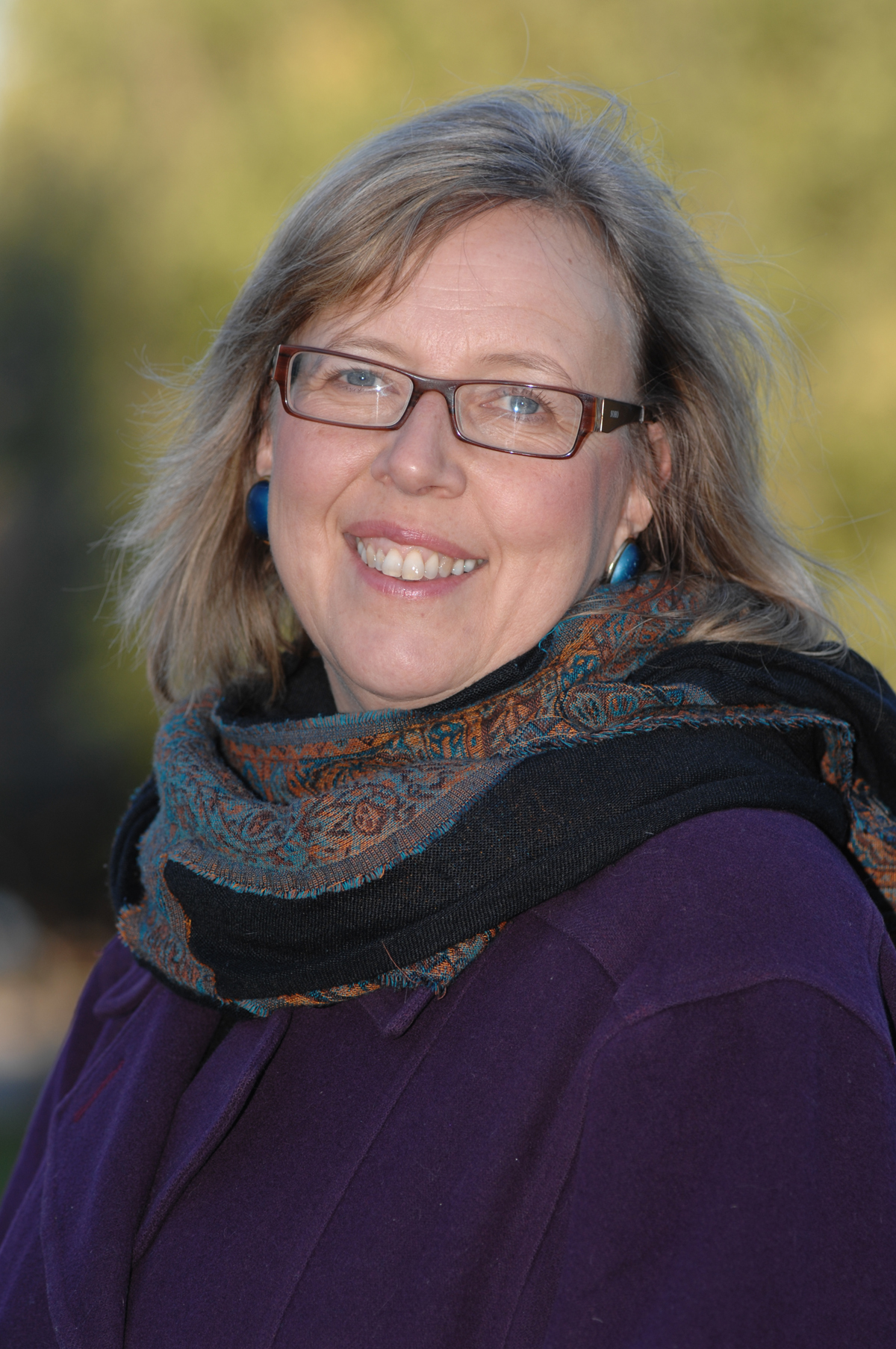
Party leaders and participants
Conservative leader, Stephen Harper	Liberal leader, Stéphane Dion
Stephen Harper; Conservative	Stéphane Dion; Liberal	Jack Layton; NDP
Gilles Duceppe, Bloc Québécois		Elizabeth May, Green

Two debates took place during the 2008 election. The French-language debate was on October 1 from 8:00 to 10:00 p.m. EDT and was moderated by Stéphan Bureau. The English-language debate was held the following evening, from 9:00 to 11:00 p.m. EDT, and was moderated by Steve Paikin. Both were held at the National Arts Centre in Ottawa. The timing of the English debate, at exactly the same time as the previously scheduled U.S. vice presidential debate, means that Canadian networks did not have to preempt any popular simulcast American programming in order to carry the domestic broadcast. Sources close to the consortium reported that this was indeed a key motivation for choosing the October 2 date.

The five participants were Conservative leader and incumbent prime minister Stephen Harper, Liberal leader Stéphane Dion, NDP leader Jack Layton, Bloc Québécois leader Gilles Duceppe, and Green Party leader Elizabeth May.

The consortium had announced that the Greens would again be excluded from the debates even though sitting MP Blair Wilson had crossed the floor to the Greens just prior to dissolution. Two parties, the Conservatives and the NDP, opposed the inclusion of the Green Party, citing a deal struck between the Green Party and Liberals where the Liberals would not run in Green Party leader Elizabeth May's riding, Central Nova, and the Green party in Liberal leader Stéphane Dion's riding, Saint-Laurent—Cartierville. Stephen Harper and Jack Layton said that if the Green Party were included, they would not participate in the Leaders' Debates. Dion said that while he supports May's inclusion, he would not attend if the prime minister did not, and the Bloc Québécois said it never threatened to boycott the debates. The media consortium in charge of the debate decided that it would prefer to broadcast the debates with the four major party leaders, rather than risk not at all. The Green Party indicated it would lodge a formal complaint with the Canadian Radio-television and Telecommunications Commission (CRTC). Tony Burman, a former CBC News Chief and Chair of the Network Consortium, called the process "a sham" and called for an independent body to govern the debates.

A considerable public outcry resulted, with extensive coverage on TV, radio, and websites. The NDP leader in particular came under pressure from his own members and supporters. Former prime minister Joe Clark called for May to be included. On September 10, the Conservatives and NDP announced they no longer opposed May's participation; shortly thereafter, the consortium invited May to participate.

=== Format and draw results ===
The following format was to be followed for the 2008 debates:

- Each leader will have 45 seconds for an opening statement, and the same length for a closing statement.
- The debates will each be divided into eight themed segments (one question per theme). The leaders will be informed of the themes, but not the questions, five days prior to the debates.
- Questions will be posed by Canadians via pre-taped segments. These will be selected from questions submitted to the consortium via email.
- For each question, each leader will have 45 seconds to respond, followed by eight minutes of open debate.

The parties and the consortium later agreed to allot additional time to the economy because of the 2008 financial crisis. The opening and closing statements have been eliminated.

Pursuant to draws held on September 19, the following order was used for the debates:

Language	Order of:	First	Second	Third	Fourth	Fifth
French	Responses to first question	Conservative	Liberal	Green	Bloc	NDP
French	Post-debate scrums	Bloc	Conservative	Liberal	Green	NDP
English	Responses to first question	Green	Liberal	Conservative	NDP	Bloc
English	Post-debate scrums	Liberal	Green	Bloc	NDP	Conservative

The Conservatives were re-elected with a slightly increased minority, the Liberals suffered losses but remained official opposition, the Bloc suffered minor losses and the NDP again made modest gains.

== 2011 debates ==
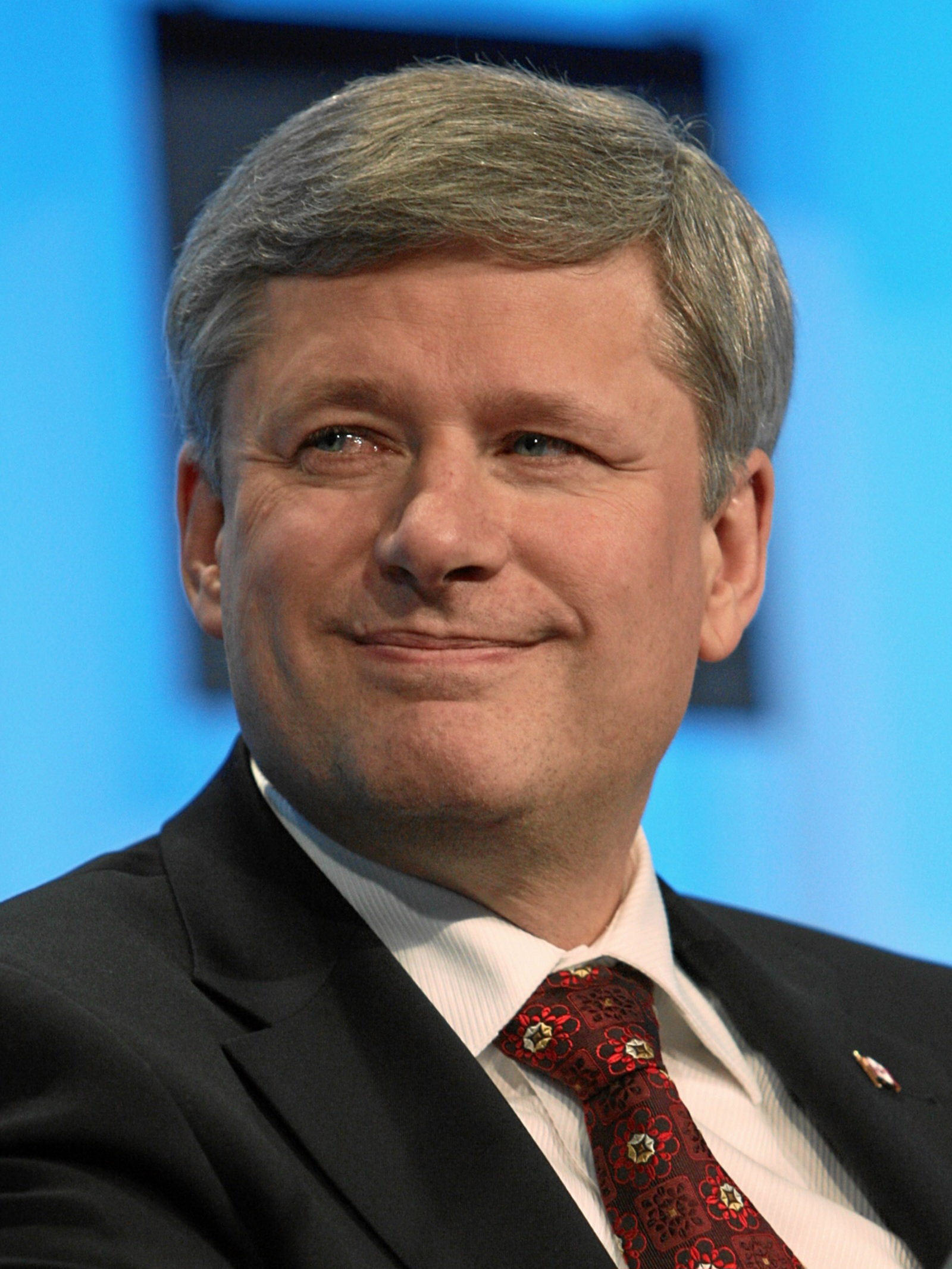
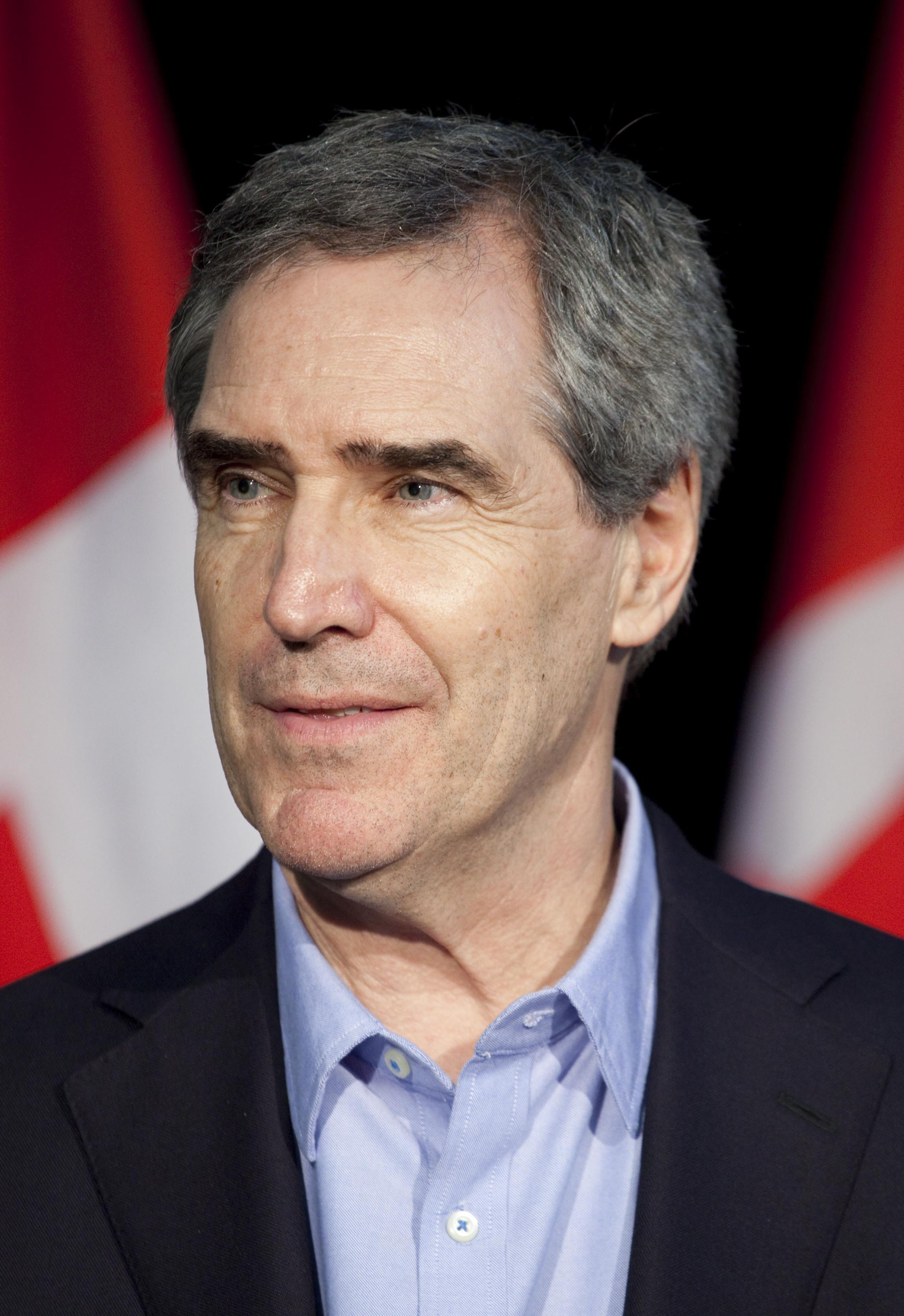
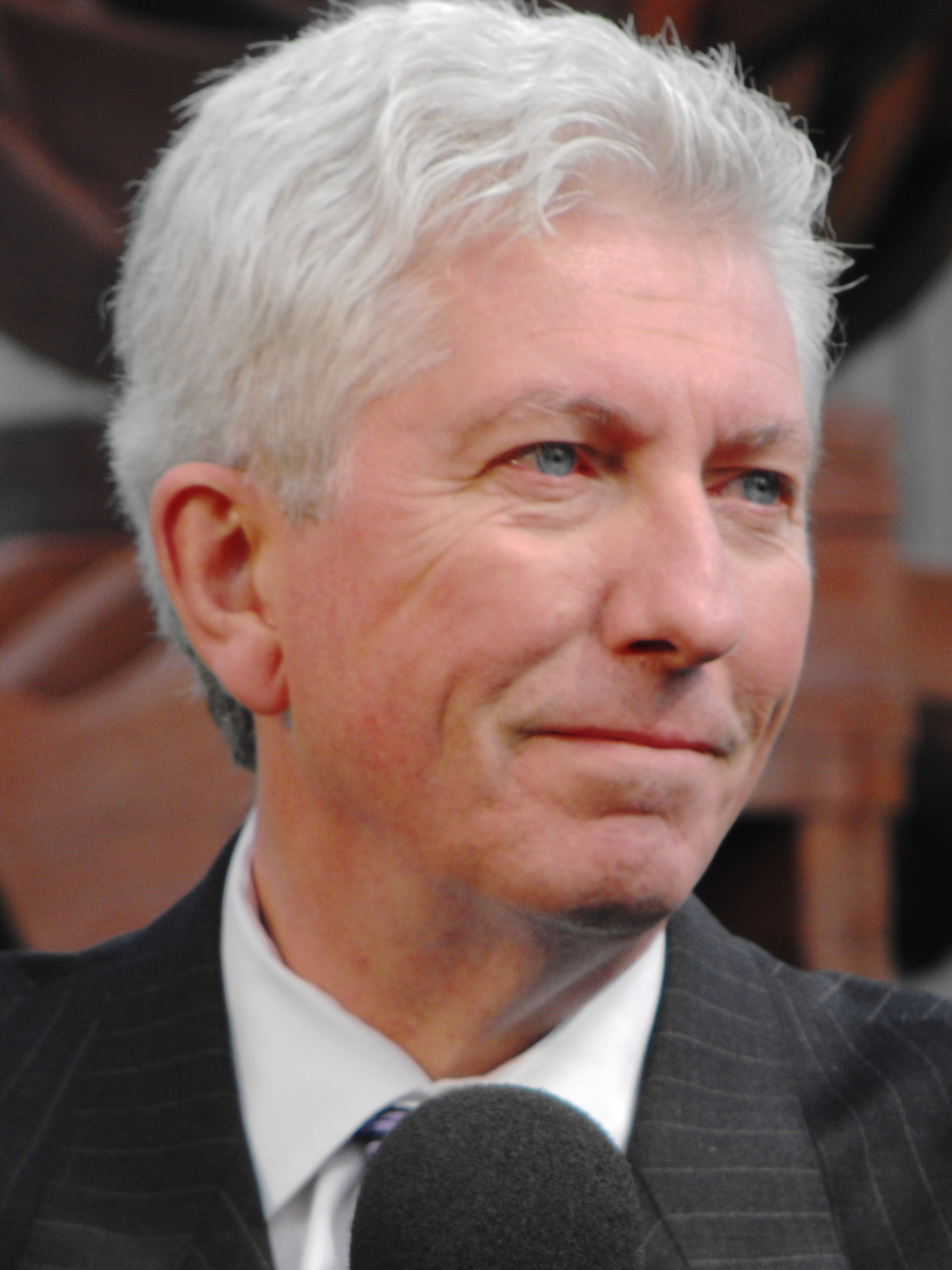
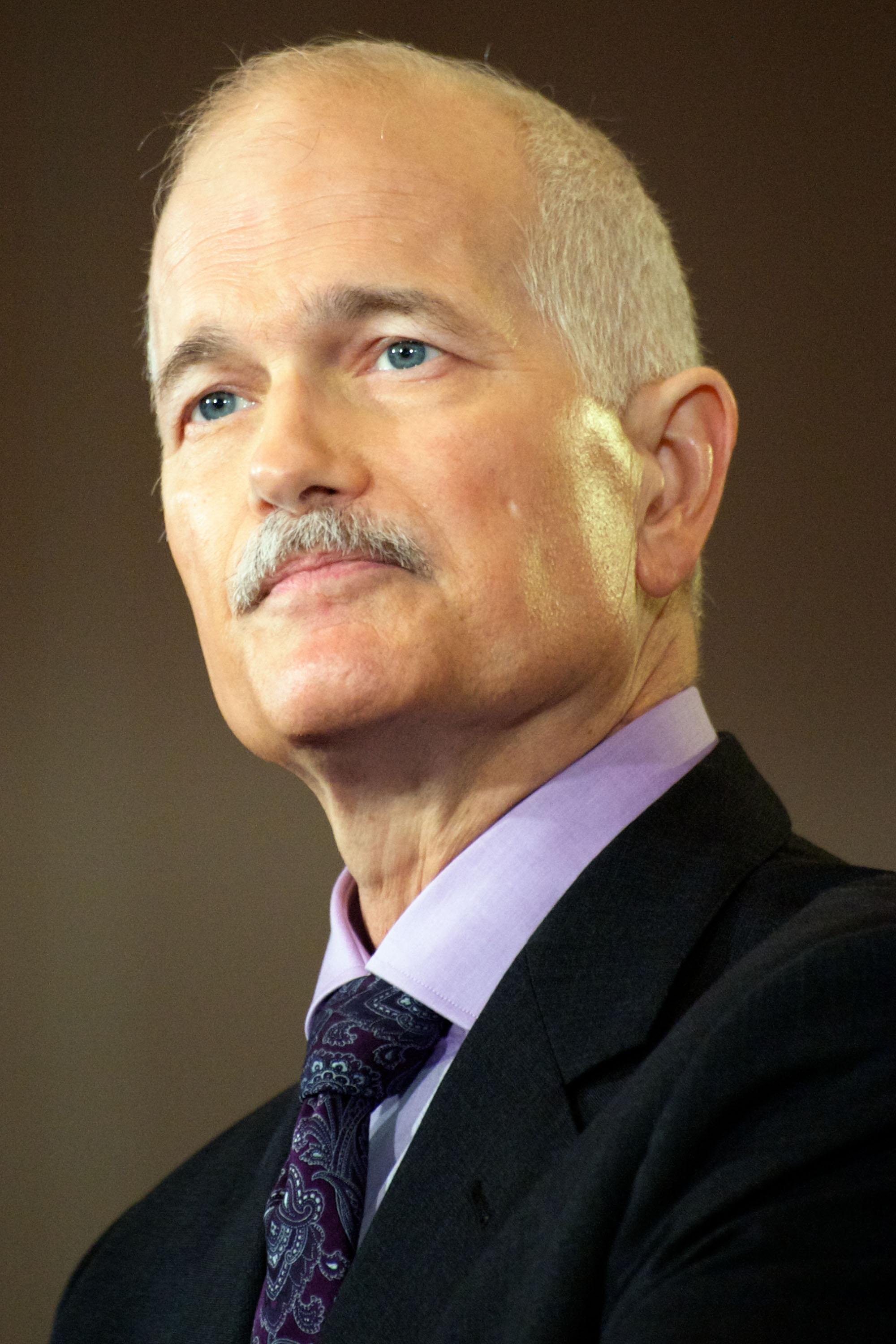
Party leaders and participants
Conservative leader, Stephen Harper	Liberal leader, Michael Ignatieff
Stephen Harper, Conservative	Michael Ignatieff, Liberal
Gilles Duceppe, Bloc Québécois	Jack Layton, NDP

Two debates took place during the 2011 election. The English-language debate was held on April 12, 2011 from 7:00 to 9:00 p.m. EDT, and was moderated by Steve Paikin. The French-language debate was held on April 13 from 8:00 to 10:00 p.m. EDT and was co-moderated by Paul Larocque and Anne-Marie Dussault. Both were held at the Government Conference Centre in Ottawa. After the original date was chosen for the French debate, a Montreal Canadiens playoff hockey game was scheduled for the same day, causing the debate to be moved one night forward. The four participants in both debates were Conservative leader and incumbent prime minister Stephen Harper, Liberal leader Michael Ignatieff, NDP leader Jack Layton, and Bloc Québécois leader Gilles Duceppe. Green Party leader Elizabeth May was excluded from the debate by the media consortium, as her party did not have representation in the House of Commons.

The English debate was best known for Layton's attack on Ignatieff for having the worst House of Commons attendance record of any of the party leaders. Layton said, "You know, most Canadians, if they don't show up for work, they don't get a promotion." This quote has been compared to Brian Mulroney's "You had an option, sir — you could have said 'no'." rebuttal to John Turner.

The new Conservative Party won its first majority mandate, and the NDP formed the official opposition for the first time with 103 seats. Conservative gains came mostly at the expense of the Liberals in the GTA, while NDP gains came from equally from the Bloc Quebecois, Liberals and Conservatives in Quebec, and to a lesser extent from the Liberals in Ontario (primarily Toronto). The Liberals came in third (34 seats and less than 19% of the vote), while the Bloc Québécois was reduced to only 4 seats. The Greens won their first seat in British Columbia.

== 2015 debates ==
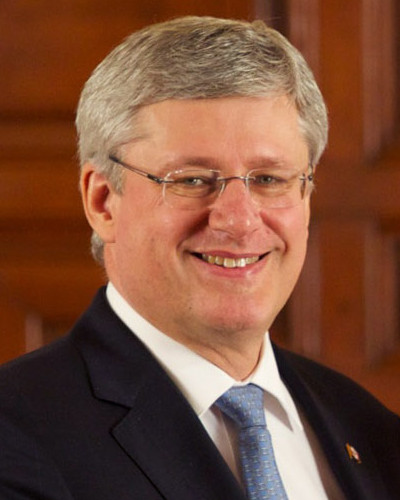
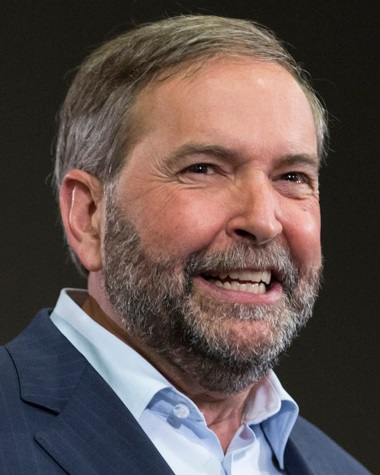
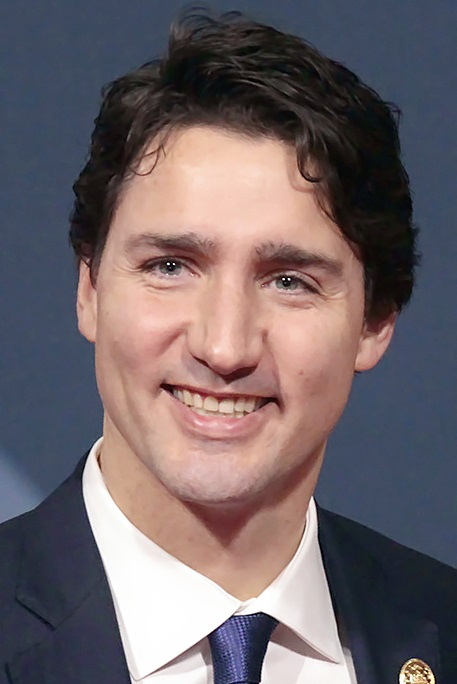
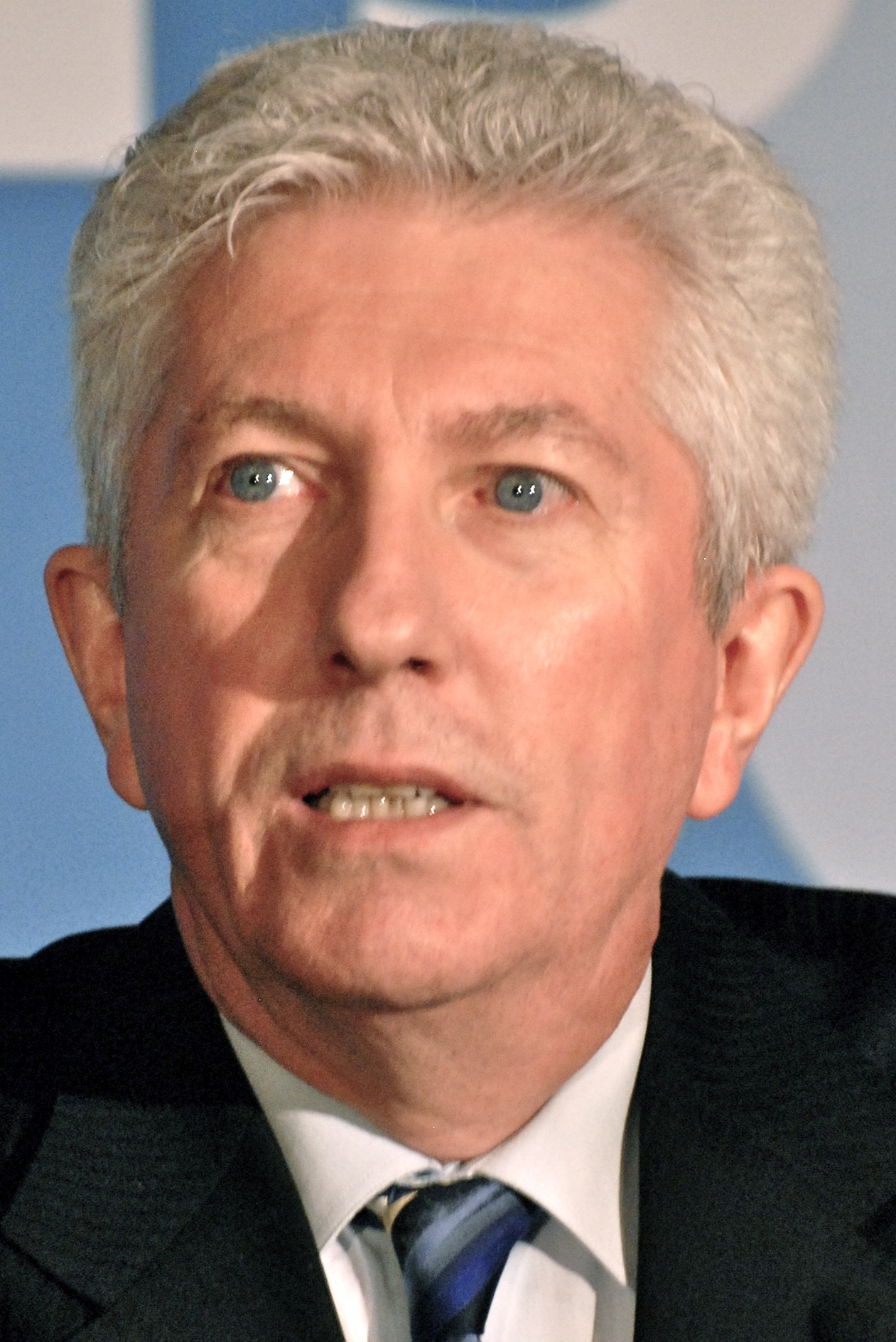
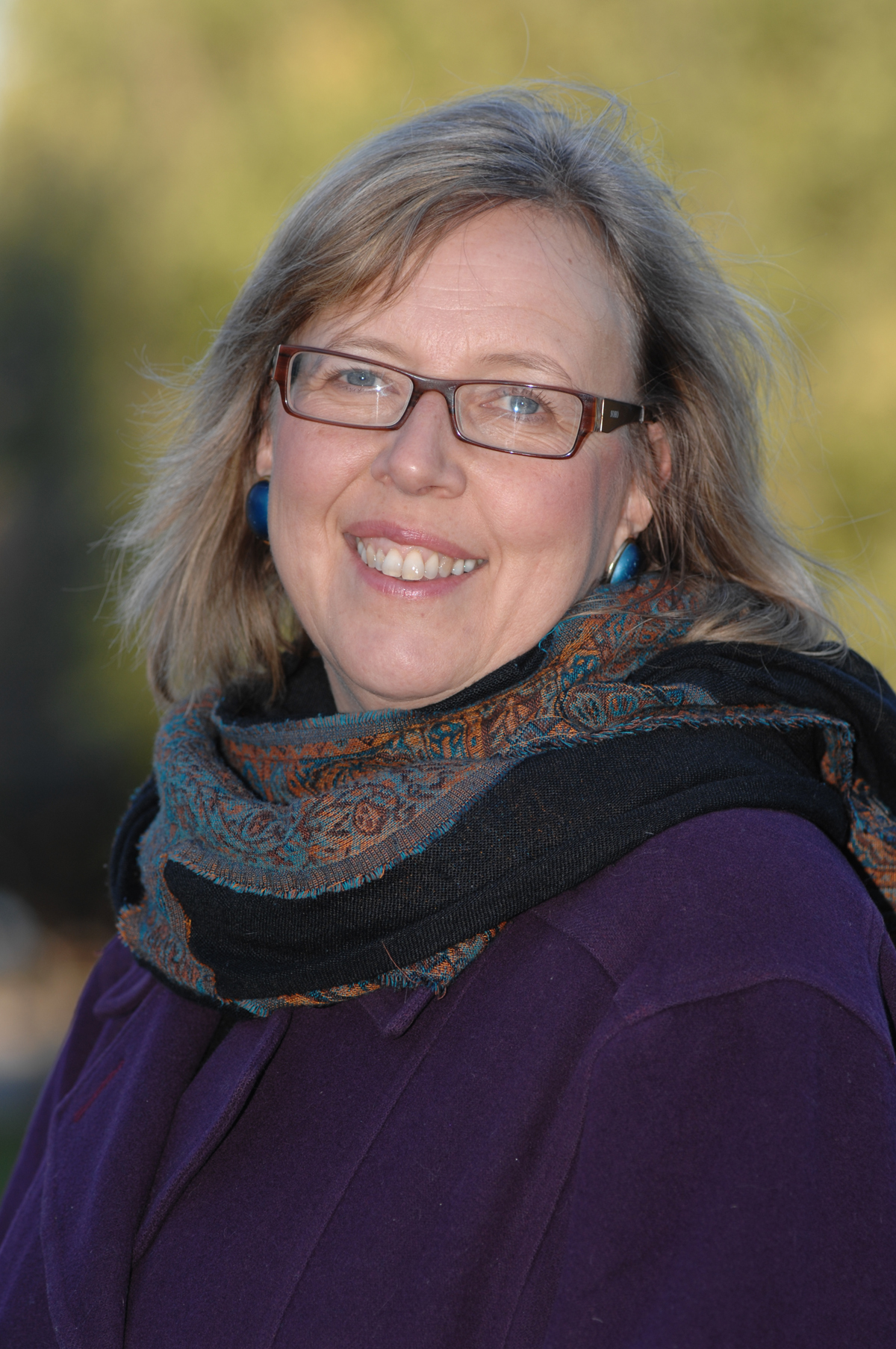
Party leaders and participants
Conservative leader, Stephen Harper		Liberal leader, Justin Trudeau
Stephen Harper, Conservative	Thomas Mulcair, NDP	Justin Trudeau, Liberal
Gilles Duceppe, Bloc Québécois		Elizabeth May, Green

Traditionally, party leaders participated in at least two nationally televised debates during the federal election – at least one each in English and French. These debates were produced by a consortium of Canada's major television networks. In May 2015, the Conservatives said they would not participate in the consortium debates and instead would take part in as many as five independently staged debates in the run-up to the fall federal election. Ultimately, the Conservatives agreed to participate in a French-language debate organized by the consortium of broadcasters as one of their five debates. The New Democratic Party confirmed that Tom Mulcair would accept every debate where the prime minister was present. The NDP had previously confirmed their intention to participate in both of the consortium debates before Stephen Harper withdrew but ultimately only participated in the French language consortium debate which included the Conservatives. Liberal leader Justin Trudeau attended the Maclean's, Globe and Mail, and French consortium debates; and the Liberals confirmed he would attend the other debates. The Bloc Québécois attended the French language consortium debate and confirmed their attendance at the French-language TVA debate. The Green Party attended the Maclean's and French language consortium debates, and confirmed their intention to participate in the English language consortium debate. Strength in Democracy, which had the same number of seats in the House of Commons at dissolution as the Greens and Bloc Québécois, were not invited to participate in any of the televised debates. The leaders of the party objected to their exclusion and launched a petition demanding that all parties represented in Parliament be invited to the debates. Other minor parties without representation in the House of Commons were not invited to participate in any of the televised debates.

Completed televised debates:

Subject	Participants	Date	Organizer	Location	Notes
General	Conservatives; NDP; Liberals; Greens	August 6	Rogers Media, (Maclean's, City)	Toronto	English language debate hosted by Maclean's magazine, moderated by political columnist Paul Wells. The debate included live translations into French, Italian, Mandarin, Cantonese and Punjabi. Aired live on City stations (English), CPAC (French), and Omni Television stations (all other languages); streamed live at the Maclean's website and all networks' websites, Facebook, and YouTube; and on Rogers Media news radio stations.
Economy	Conservatives; Liberals; NDP	September 17	The Globe and Mail and Google Canada	Calgary	English language debate on the Canadian economy hosted by The Globe and Mail, moderated by editor-in-chief David Walmsley. The first half of the 90-minute debate covered five central themes on the economy: jobs, energy and the environment, infrastructure, housing and taxation. The second half consisted of follow-up questions and questions sent in by voters. Aired live nationwide on CPAC in both official languages with an additional English feed in Ontario on CHCH, streamed live on The Globe and Mail's website, and distributed on YouTube. Uninvited Green Party leader Elizabeth May answered questions on Twitter live during the debate at an event in Victoria, British Columbia.
General	Conservatives; NDP; Liberals; Greens; Bloc Québécois	September 24	Consortium (CBC/Radio-Canada, CTV, Global, Télé-Québec) and La Presse	Montreal	French language debate organized by the consortium of broadcasters and the Montreal newspaper La Presse, moderated by Ici RDI journalist Anne-Marie Dussault. The debate included live translation into English. Aired live in French on Ici Radio-Canada Télé and Télé-Québec stations, and participant networks' websites; and in English on CBC News Network, CTV News Channel, and participant networks' websites.
Foreign Policy	Conservatives; NDP; Liberals	September 28	Aurea Foundation and Facebook Canada	Toronto	Bilingual debate on Canada's foreign policy hosted as part of the foundation's regular Munk Debates, moderated by Rudyard Griffiths. The debate consisted of six 12-minute segments, with two leaders debating for the first seven minutes and the third leader brought in to the debate for the final five. Aired on CPAC in both official languages with an additional English feed in Ontario on CHCH, streamed live on the Munk Debates website, and distributed on Facebook.
General	Conservatives; NDP; Liberals; Bloc Québécois;	October 2	Quebecor Media (TVA)	Montreal	French language debate organized by private broadcaster TVA, moderated by TVA Nouvelles anchor Pierre Bruneau. The debate focused on three themes: the economy, national security and Canada's place in the world, and social policies; the format consisted of six rounds of four-minute debate between two leaders, with an open debate section at the end of each theme. Aired live in French on TVA stations, Le Canal Nouvelles, and streamed on the TVA Nouvelles website; Aired with simultaneous interpretation to English on CPAC.

Proposed debates:

Subject	Invited Participants	Date	Organizer	Location	Notes
General	Conservatives (declined); NDP (declined); Liberals; Greens	October 8 (proposed)	Consortium (CBC/Radio-Canada, CTV, Global, Télé-Québec)	–	English language debate organized by the consortium of broadcasters.
Women's Issues	Conservatives (declined); NDP; Liberals; Greens; Bloc Québécois	–	Up For Debate	–	Debate that was to focus on issues identified by Up for Debate, an alliance of Canadian women's organizations. Later re-formatted as a panel discussion Toronto hosted by Up for Debate, the Toronto Star, and Le Devoir. Leaders were interviewed separately and their pre-recorded responses were discussed and debated by panellists led by author Jess Beaulieu.
Elderly Issues	NDP	–	CARP	–	
Economy	Conservatives; NDP; Liberals	–	Bloomberg News	–	English language debate
General		–	HuffPost, Twitter Canada, and Samara Canada	–	

== 2019 debates ==
Party leaders and participants

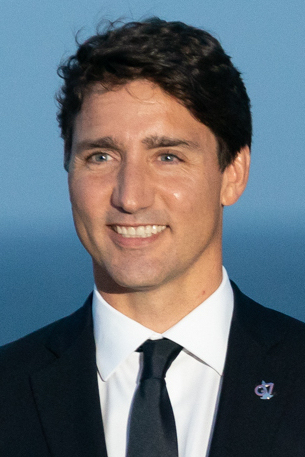
Justin Trudeau, Liberal

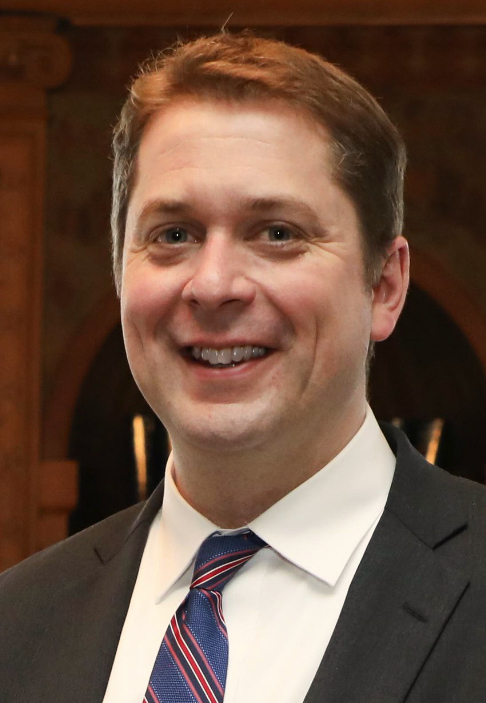
Andrew Scheer, Conservative

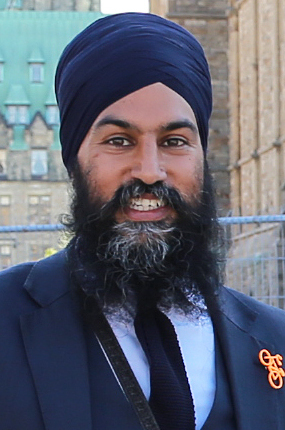
Jagmeet Singh, NDP

Yves-François Blanchet, Bloc Québécois

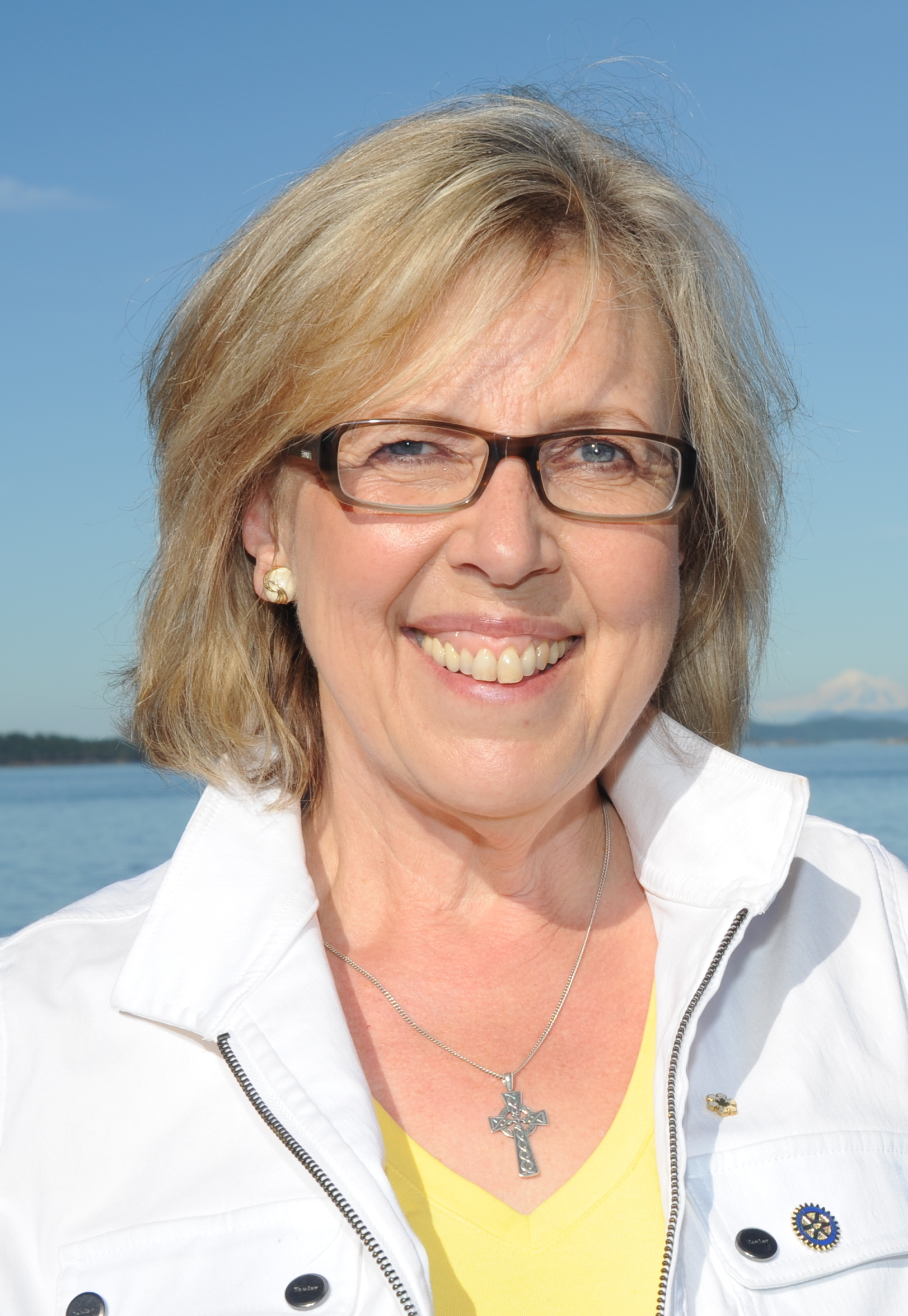
Elizabeth May, Green

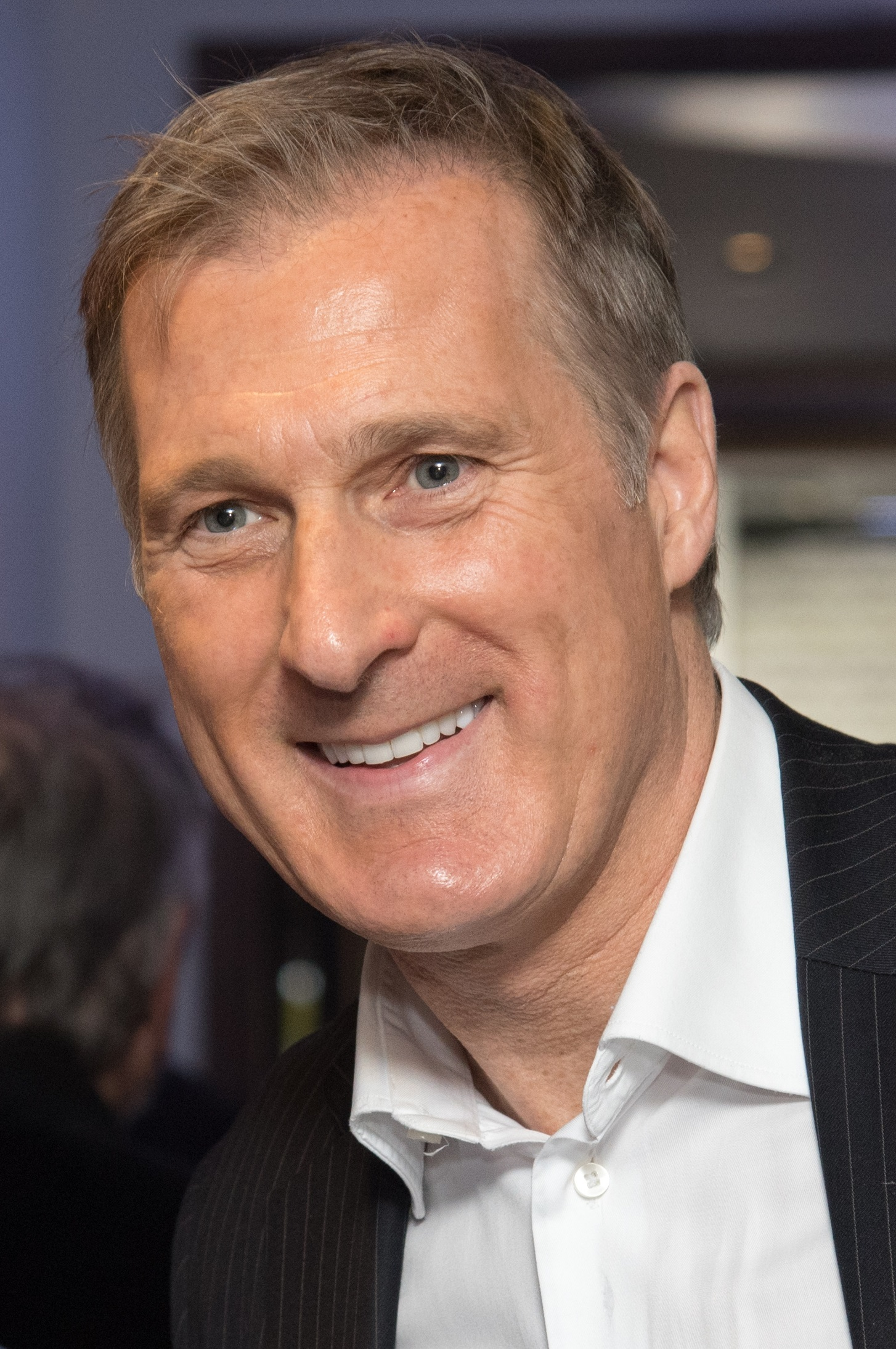
Maxime Bernier; People's Party

The first debate was hosted by Maclean's and Citytv on September 12. Scheer, Singh and May participated. Trudeau declined his invitation. An empty podium was left on stage for him.

Two official debates were organized and held by the newly created Leaders' Debates Commission. The English language debate took place on October 7 and the French on October 10. Both debates took place at the Canadian Museum of History in Gatineau, Quebec.

On August 12, 2019, the commissioner extended invitations for Justin Trudeau, Andrew Scheer, Jagmeet Singh, Elizabeth May and Yves-François Blanchet to attend. He also sent a letter to Maxime Bernier indicating that he did not qualify for the debates at that time, and asked for additional information from the People's Party so that a final decision could be reached by September 16. Bernier criticized the decision saying that it would not be a "real debate" without him. On September 16, the Commission announced that Bernier would be invited to attend the official debates.

The government established rules in 2018 to determine which party leaders are invited to the official debates. To be invited a party must satisfy two of the following:

1. Have at least one member elected under the party's banner;
2. Nominate candidates to run in at least 90% of all ridings;
3. Have captured at least 4% of the votes in the previous election or be considered by the commissioner to have a legitimate chance to win seats in the current election, based on public opinion polls.

In November 2018, Minister of Democratic Institutions Karina Gould said that Maxime Bernier would qualify for the debates as leader of the People's Party of Canada if the party nominated candidates in 90% of ridings.

Completed debates:

Subject	Invited participants	Date	Organizer	Location	Notes
Economy, foreign policy, indigenous issues and the environment	Liberals; Conservatives; NDP; Greens	September 12, 2019	Maclean's and Citytv	Toronto	The debate was moderated by Paul Wells. Scheer, Singh and May participated. Justin Trudeau did not attend. An empty podium was left on stage for him. The "At Issue" panel on CBC's The National, praised each of the three leaders' performances. The panel believed that Trudeau's re-election odds would not be negatively affected for missing the debate. Following the debate, some of Mr. Scheer's comments were criticized as misleading, while another comment caused controversy relating to the rights of Indigenous people.
Immigration, social policy, economy, environment, governance and the place of Quebec in Canada	Liberals; Conservatives, Bloc and NDP	October 2, 2019	TVA	Montreal	This French language debate took place on October 2, 2019 and was hosted by the Quebec television network, TVA. It was moderated by Pierre Bruneau. Trudeau committed to attending, after the date was moved forward from the originally scheduled date of October 16. Neither Elizabeth May nor Maxime Bernier were invited due to them not having elected an MP under their respective parties' banners in Quebec. Following the debate, political commentators praised the performances of Trudeau, Singh and Blanchet. The winner varied depending on the analyst, but general consensus was that Andrew Scheer had performed poorly. Based on a poll they conducted, David Colleto from Abacus Data came to the conclusion that Andrew Scheer did not have a good night, that Blanchet and Trudeau could split the spoils of victory and that Mr. Singh performed well and francophones responded favourably to what they saw, but that it may not be enough to boost NDP fortunes in Quebec. Furthermore, some of each leaders' comments were criticized as misleading.
Affordability, economic insecurity, environment, energy, Indigenous issues, leadership in Canada and on the world stage, polarization, human rights, and immigration.	Liberals; Conservatives; Bloc; NDP; Greens; People's	October 7, 2019	Leaders' Debates Commission	Canadian Museum of History, Gatineau	This English language debate was moderated by Rosemary Barton, Susan Delacourt, Dawna Friesen, Lisa LaFlamme and Althia Raj, each responsible for a portion of the debate. It was produced by the Canadian Debate Production Partnership, consisting of: CBC News/Radio-Canada, Global News, CTV News, the Toronto Star, HuffPost, La Presse, Le Devoir, and L'actualité. All five major party leaders participated. The Leader's Debate Commissioner initially determined Bernier did not meet the criteria for participating in the debate, but an invitation was later extended on September 16 after further documentation was submitted to the LDC. Following the debate, some experts called the format a disaster. Furthermore, some of the leader's comments were criticized as misleading.
Economy, finances, environment, energy, foreign policy, immigration, identity, ethics, governance and service to citizens	Liberals; Conservatives; Bloc; NDP; Greens; People's	October 10, 2019	Leaders' Debates Commission	Canadian Museum of History, Gatineau	This French language debate was moderated by Patrice Roy, who was assisted by several journalists from prominent Quebec newspapers. It was produced by the newly formed Canadian Debate Production Partnership, which is made up of the following broadcasters and newspapers: CBC News/Radio-Canada, Global News, CTV News, the Toronto Star, HuffPost, La Presse, Le Devoir, and L'actualité. All five major party leaders participated. The Leader's Debate Commissioner initially determined Bernier to not meet the criteria for participating in the debate, but an invitation was later extended on September 16 after further documentation was submitted to the LDC.

Cancelled debates:

Subject	Invited participants	Date	Organizer	Location	Notes
Foreign Policy	Liberals; Conservatives; NDP; Greens	October 1, 2019	Munk Debates	Roy Thomson Hall, Toronto	Munk Debates called for a bilingual leaders debate on foreign policy. Andrew Scheer, Jagmeet Singh and Elizabeth May agreed to attend, but Trudeau announced he would not attend. Maxime Bernier was not invited. Due to Trudeau not attending, the debate was cancelled.
Climate Change	Liberals; Conservatives; NDP; Greens	October 16, 2019	The University of Ottawa's Smart Prosperity Institute and Climate Action Network Canada	Ottawa	On July 17, protesters gathered in cities across Canada calling for a leaders' debate to be held on the topic of climate change. The protests were directed at CBC News after organizers were told that broadcasters not the commission would determine the questions and topics of the debates. In response to the protests, the CBC released a statement saying that the commission and the editorial group at the broadcaster ultimately selected to host the debates would be responsible for making such determinations. On August 8, 2019, organizers delivered a petition with 48,000 signatures to the CBC. On September 9, 2019, invitations were sent out asking the Liberals, NDP, Greens and Conservatives to send any of their nominated candidates from across the country. The debate was cancelled because the Conservatives refused to participate.

== 2021 debates ==
Party leaders and participants

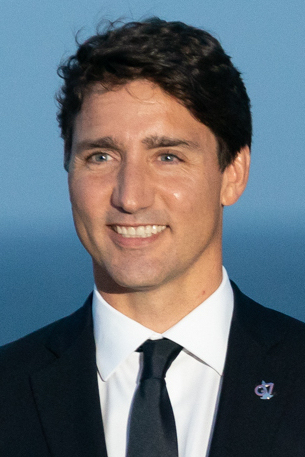
Justin Trudeau, Liberal

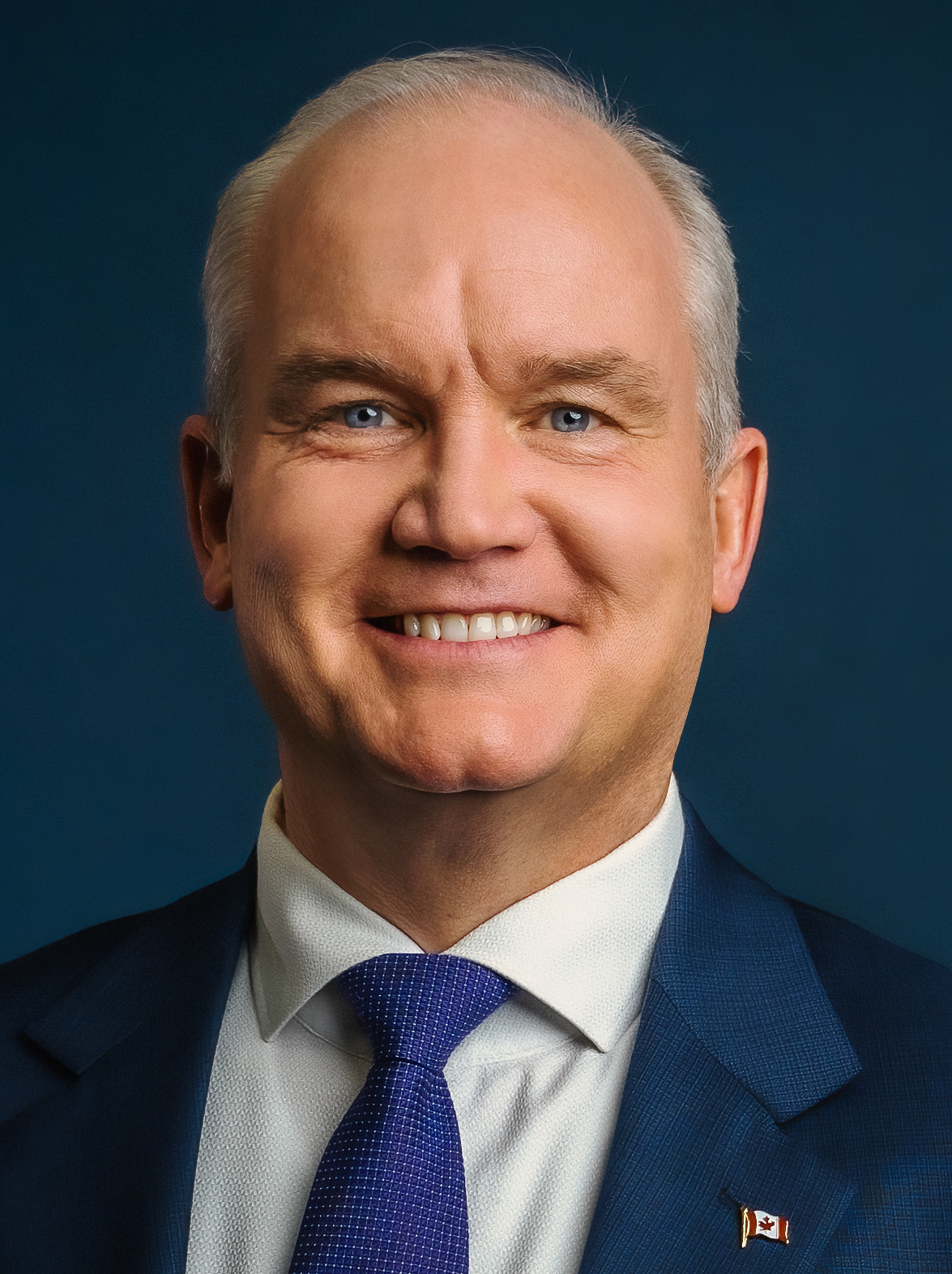
Erin O'Toole, Conservative

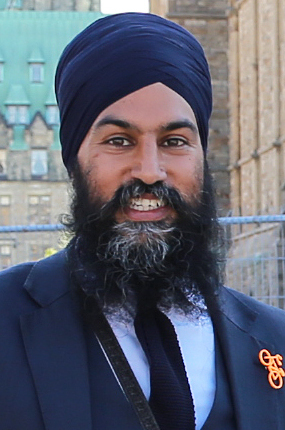
Jagmeet Singh, NDP

Yves-François Blanchet, Bloc Québécois

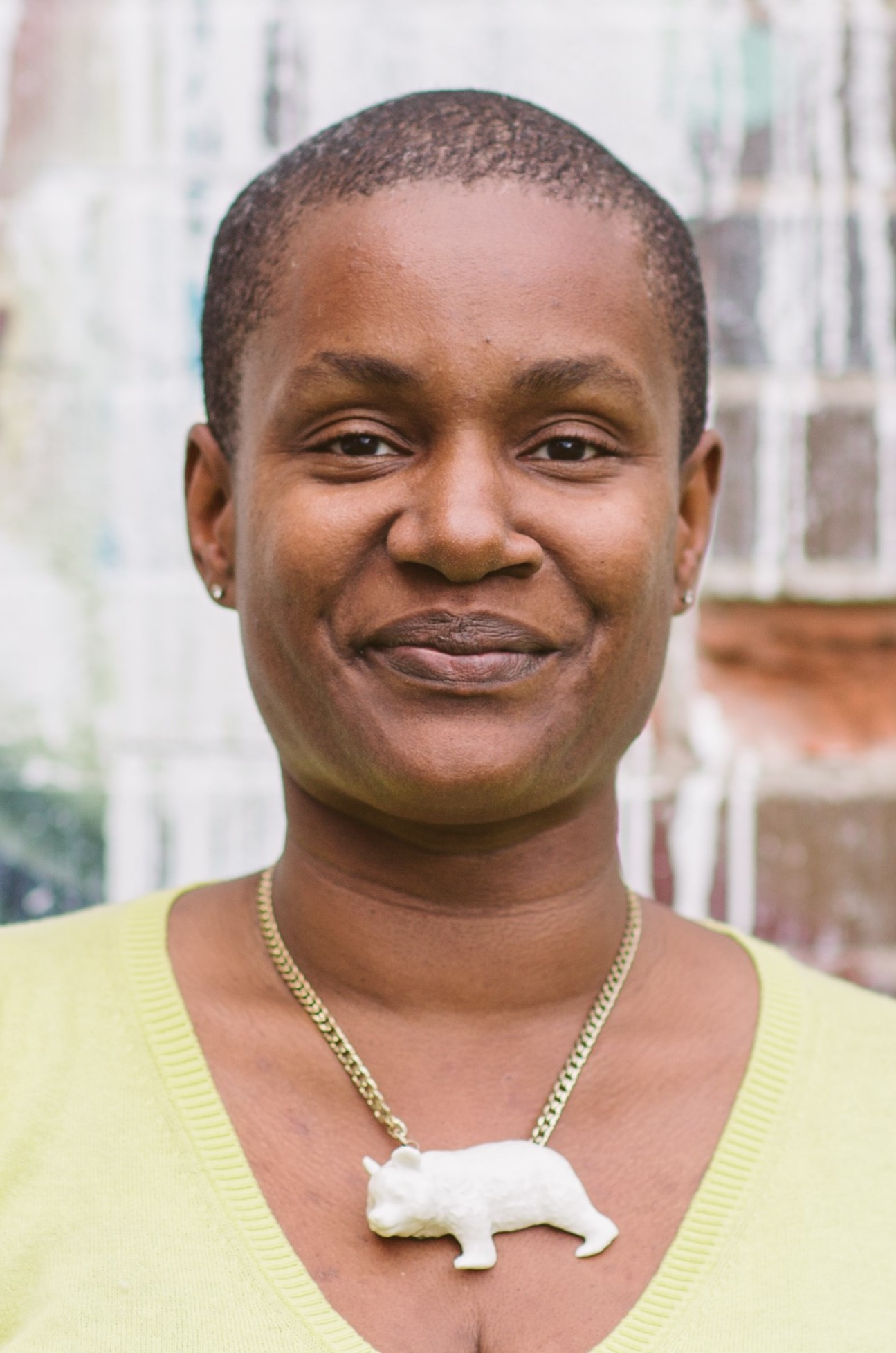
Annamie Paul, Green

Following the 2019 debates, the Leaders' Debates Commission prepared a report reviewing the 2019 debates and making recommendations for future elections debates. The report was released on June 1, 2020.

One of the recommendations of the 2020 Report was for Future Participation Criteria to be set by the Debates Commissioner. The Debate Commissioner released Participation Criteria for the 2021 Election in June 2021. To be invited a party must satisfy at least one of the following:

1. Have at least one member elected under the party's banner;
2. Have captured at least 4% of the votes in the previous election; and
3. Five days after the date the general election is called, have an average level of national support of at least 4% in Opinion Polls as measured by leading national public opinion polling organizations.

On August 16, 2021 the commission officially invited the leaders of the Bloc Québécois, Conservative Party, Green Party, Liberal Party, and New Democratic Party as those parties had already met the first two criteria. On August 21, 2021 the commissioner confirmed that neither the People's Party nor Maverick Party met criterion 3, and therefore would not be invited to participate.

The English-language debate gained notoriety when the moderator posed a question to Blanchet that suggested some in English speaking Canada may view Quebec's law on secularism as "discriminatory". He challenged her use of that word, and the response was seen as a turning point in the Bloc's campaign, which saw an upsurge in the polls after the debate. The Quebec National Assembly passed a motion calling for a formal apology for the question.

== 2025 debates ==
Party leaders and participants

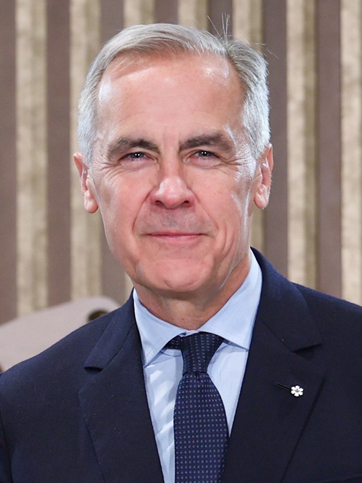
Mark Carney, Liberal

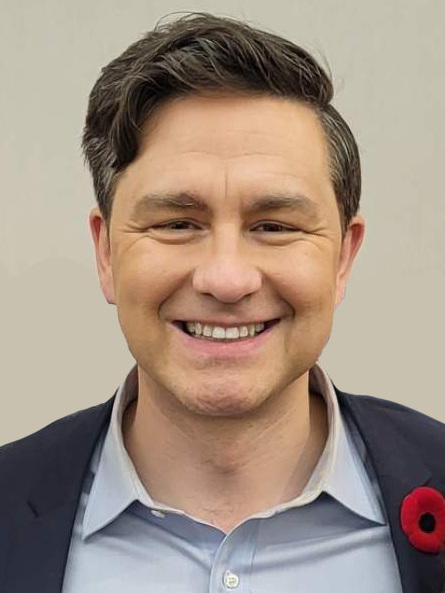
Pierre Poilievre, Conservative

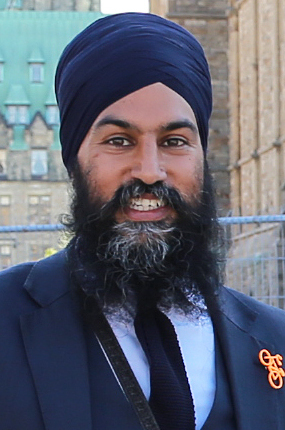
Jagmeet Singh, NDP

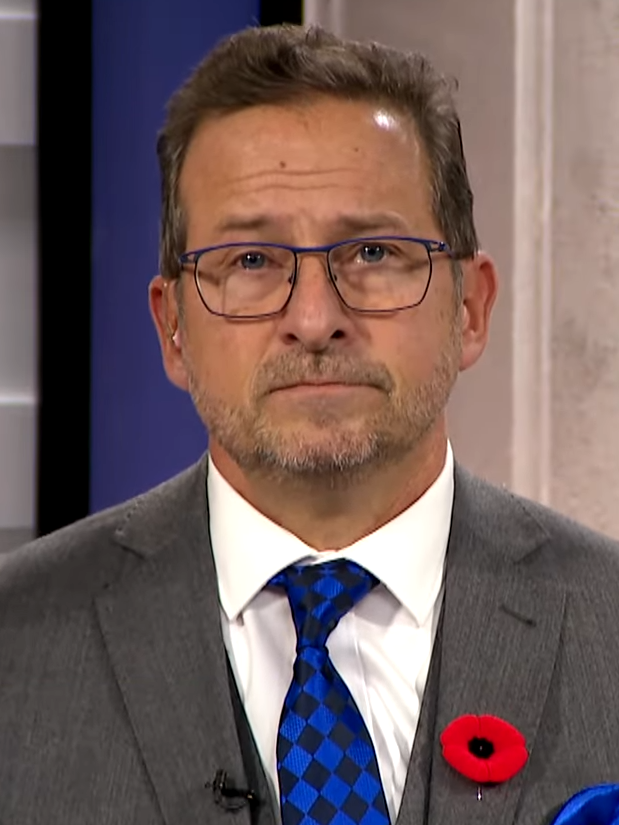
Yves-François Blanchet, Bloc Québécois

~~Jonathan Pedneault,~~; ~~Green~~ Removed from Debates

The Leaders’ Debates Commission announced its selected moderators for the 2025 federal election debates in October 2024: the English-language debate was hosted by TVO's Steve Paikin, while the French-language debate was hosted by ICI RDI's Patrice Roy. The commission released the participation criteria for the 2025 debates on January 14, 2025. To be invited, a party must satisfy at least two of the following:

1. on the date the general election is called, the party is represented in the House of Commons by a Member of Parliament who was elected as a member of that party.
2. 28 days before the date of the general election, the party receives a level of national support of at least 4%, determined by voting intention, and as measured by leading national public opinion polling organizations, using the average of those organizations' most recently publicly reported results.
3. 28 days before the date of the general election, the party has endorsed candidates in at least 90% of federal ridings.

Television network TVA announced its intention to host another French televised debate with the Liberal, Conservative, NDP, and Bloc leaders; but it would require the four parties to each pay $75,000 to cover the cost of putting on the debate. The second French debate was cancelled after Prime Minister Mark Carney announced that he would not participate in TVA's "Face-à-Face".

The Green Party was planned to be represented by its co-leader, Jonathan Pedneault. The party's invitation was rescinded on April 16 as it ultimately ran candidates in 232 ridings (less than 70%) despite earlier telling the Commission that it would run candidates in every riding. The party subsequently filed a judicial review in the Federal Court, claiming their exclusion from the debates "violated principles of procedural fairness" and that the commission criteria "expressly provided that parties were not required to show that the party had successfully nominated candidates in 90 per cent of ridings". May countered allegations that the party strategically removed candidates to prevent a Conservative win, claiming that certain candidates were unable to obtain the required number of signatures, and that electoral officers rejected several signatures presented by the Green candidates.

On April 15, the leaders of the Bloc Québécois and the NDP suggested rescheduling the French language debate because of the debate coinciding with the final hockey game of the Montreal Canadiens' regular season, after it became clear the game would decide whether the Canadiens would make the playoffs. The Commission declined to reschedule the debate to a different day, but agreed to move the start time two hours earlier to 6:00 pm EDT.

A post-debate news scrum after the French language debate was dominated by the right wing Rebel News and other right-wing media outlets, leading to complaints from other journalists at the event. Michel Cormier, the Commission's executive director, responded that he was "unaware" that Rebel News and another organization associated with Rebel founder Ezra Levant were registered as third-party advertisers with Elections Canada. In an interview, David Cochrane of CBC News, asked Cormier about the fairness of the distribution of questions among outlets and the type of questions asked. Cormier responded, "There's only so much we can do to control free speech." During the English language debate the next day, CTV News and The Globe and Mail reported a disturbance between Levant and journalists from other outlets, and a Global News reporter suggested that Rebel staff tried to interfere with the live broadcast of the debate. Cormier abruptly cancelled the planned news scrum, citing security concerns, as Montreal Police secured the venue.
