= 2021 Canadian federal election =

- September 20, 2021

338 seats in the House of Commons 170 seats needed for a majority
- Opinion polls
- Registered: 27,366,297
- Turnout: 62.3% (▼4.7 pp)
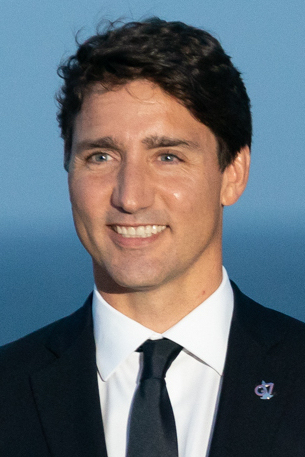

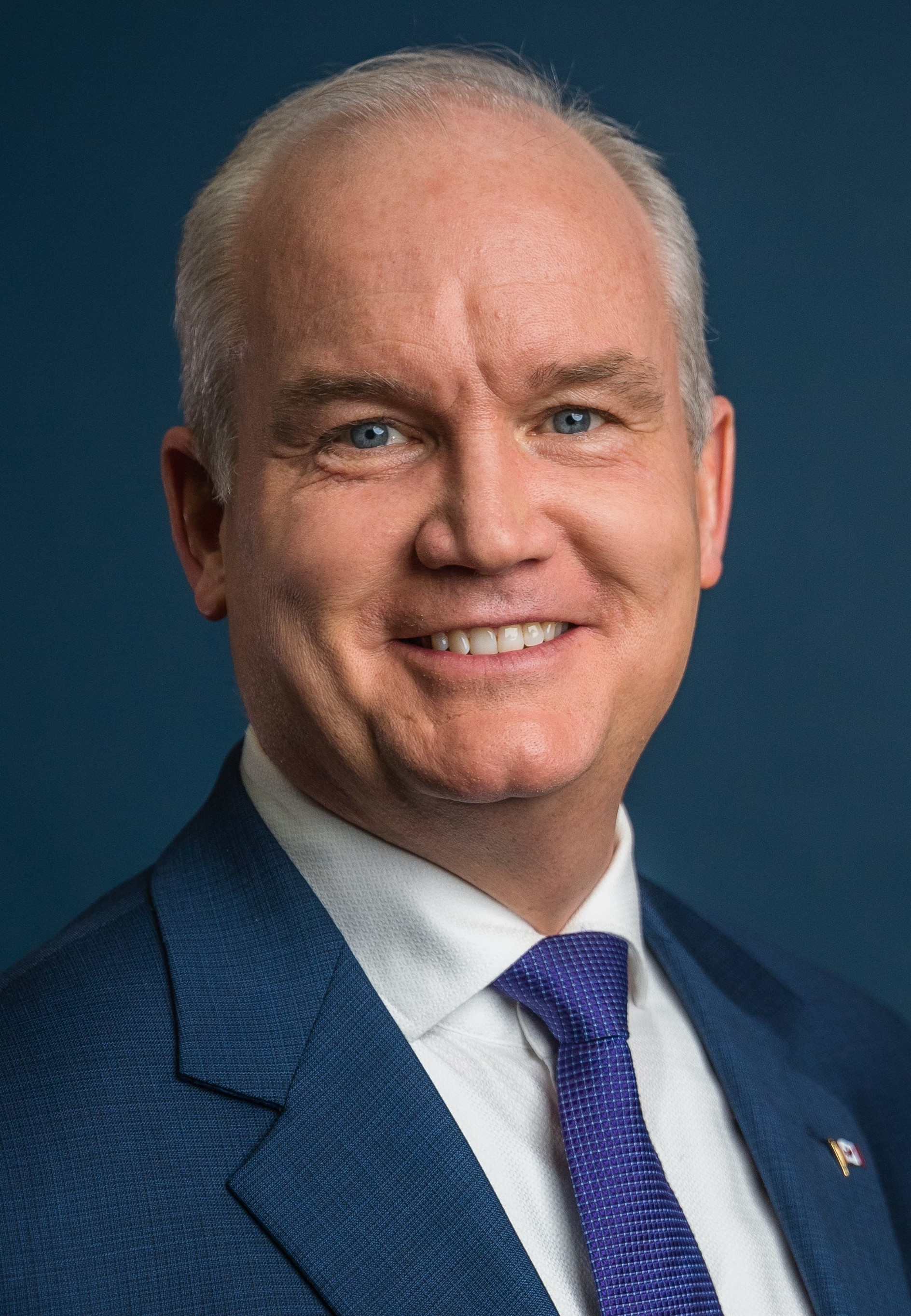

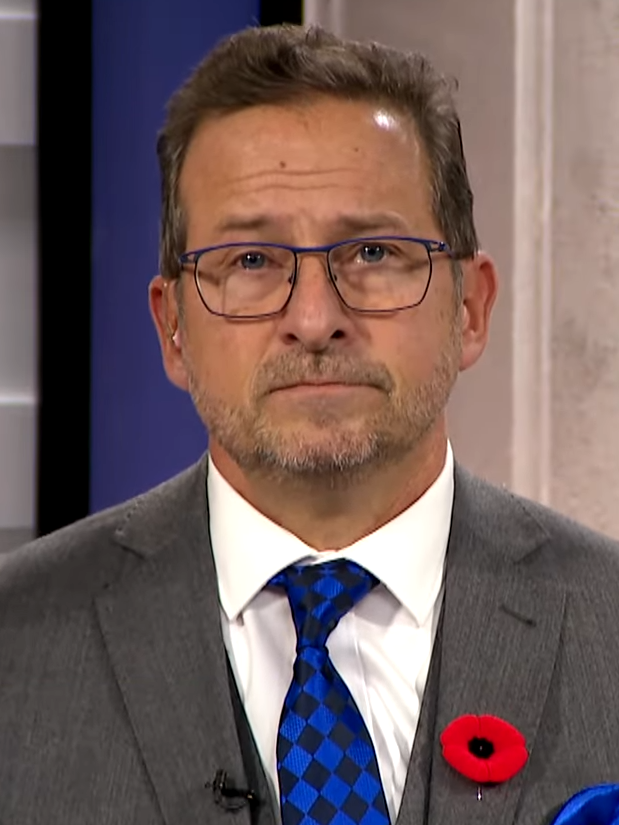

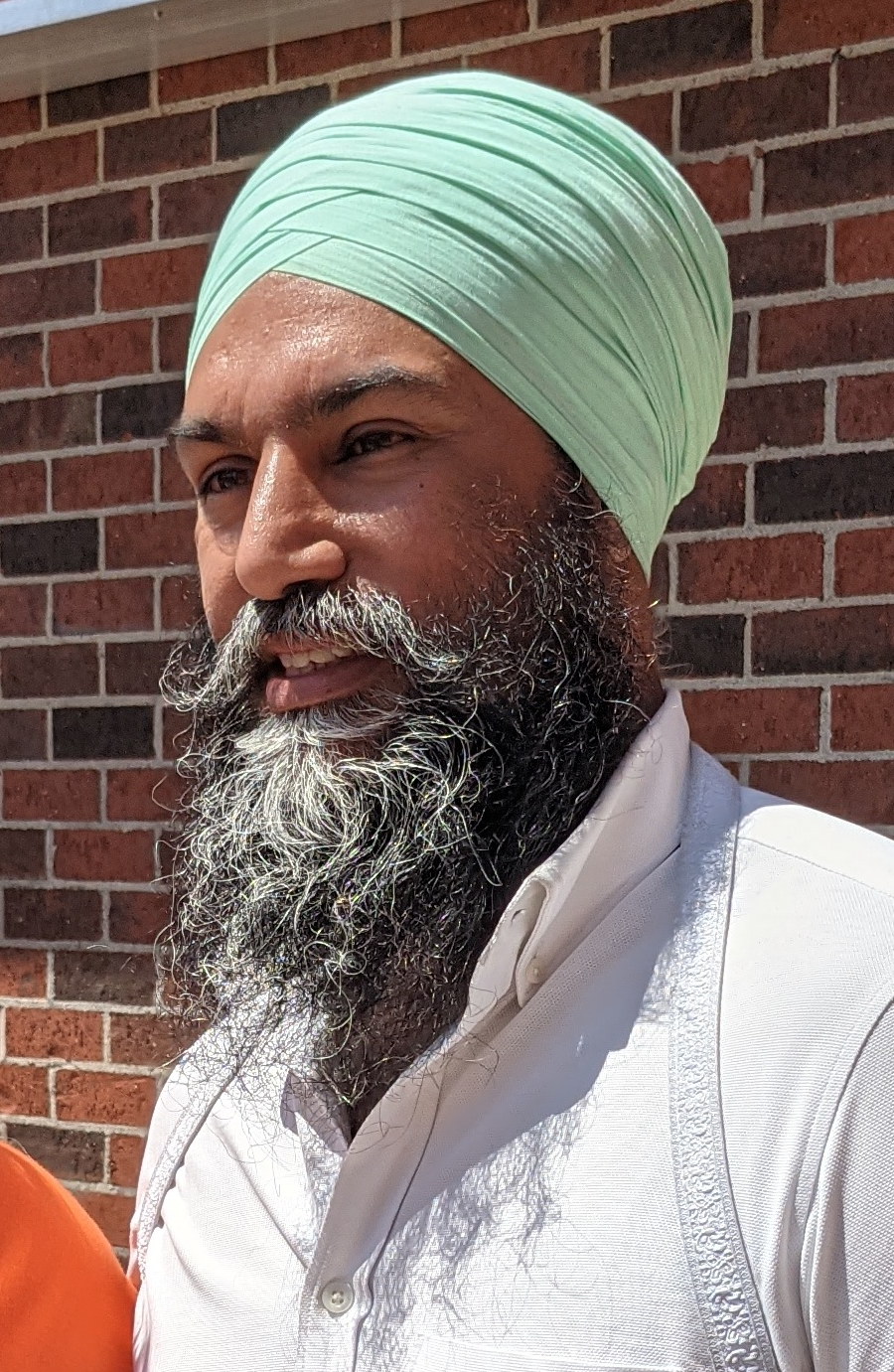

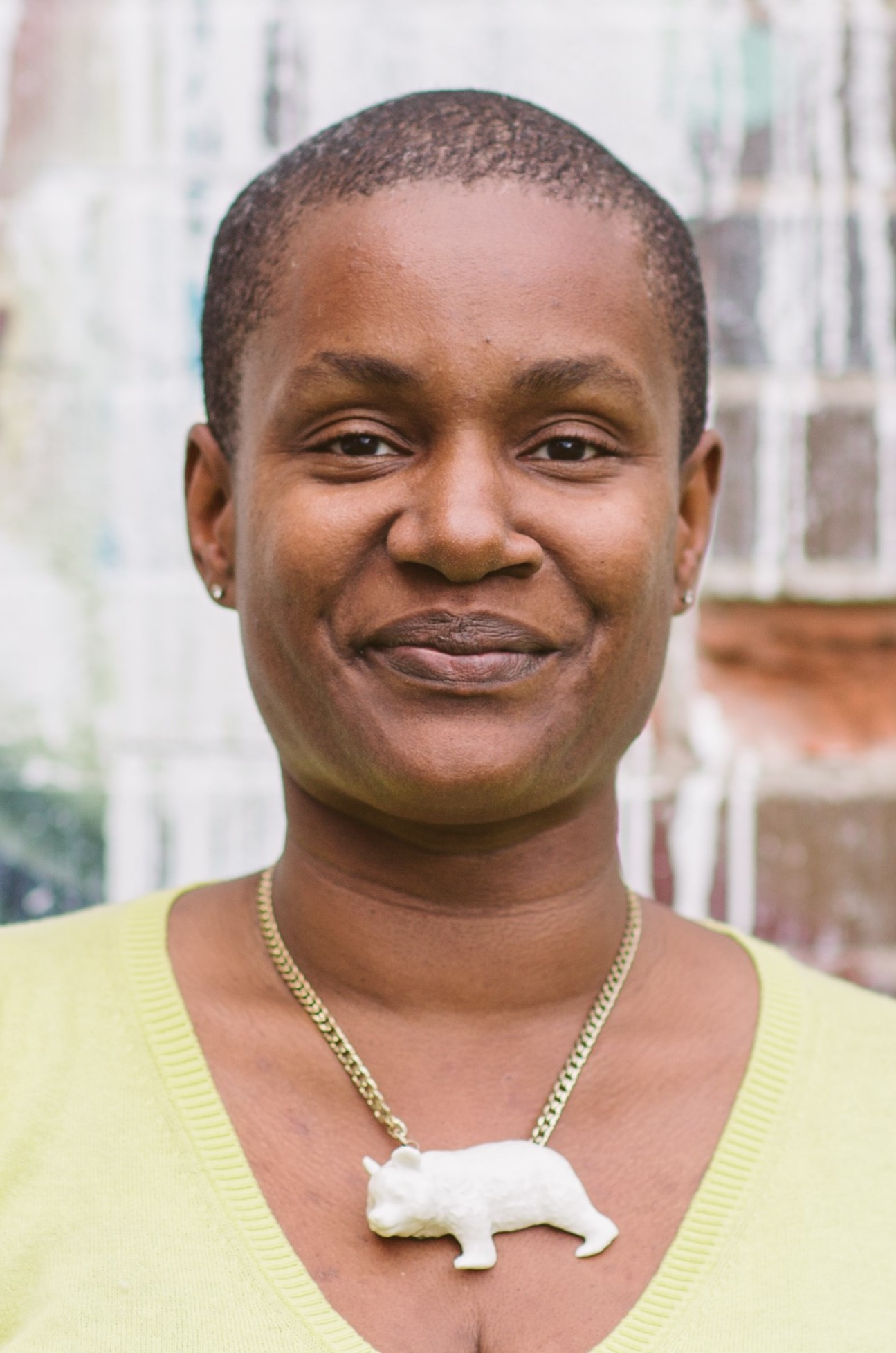

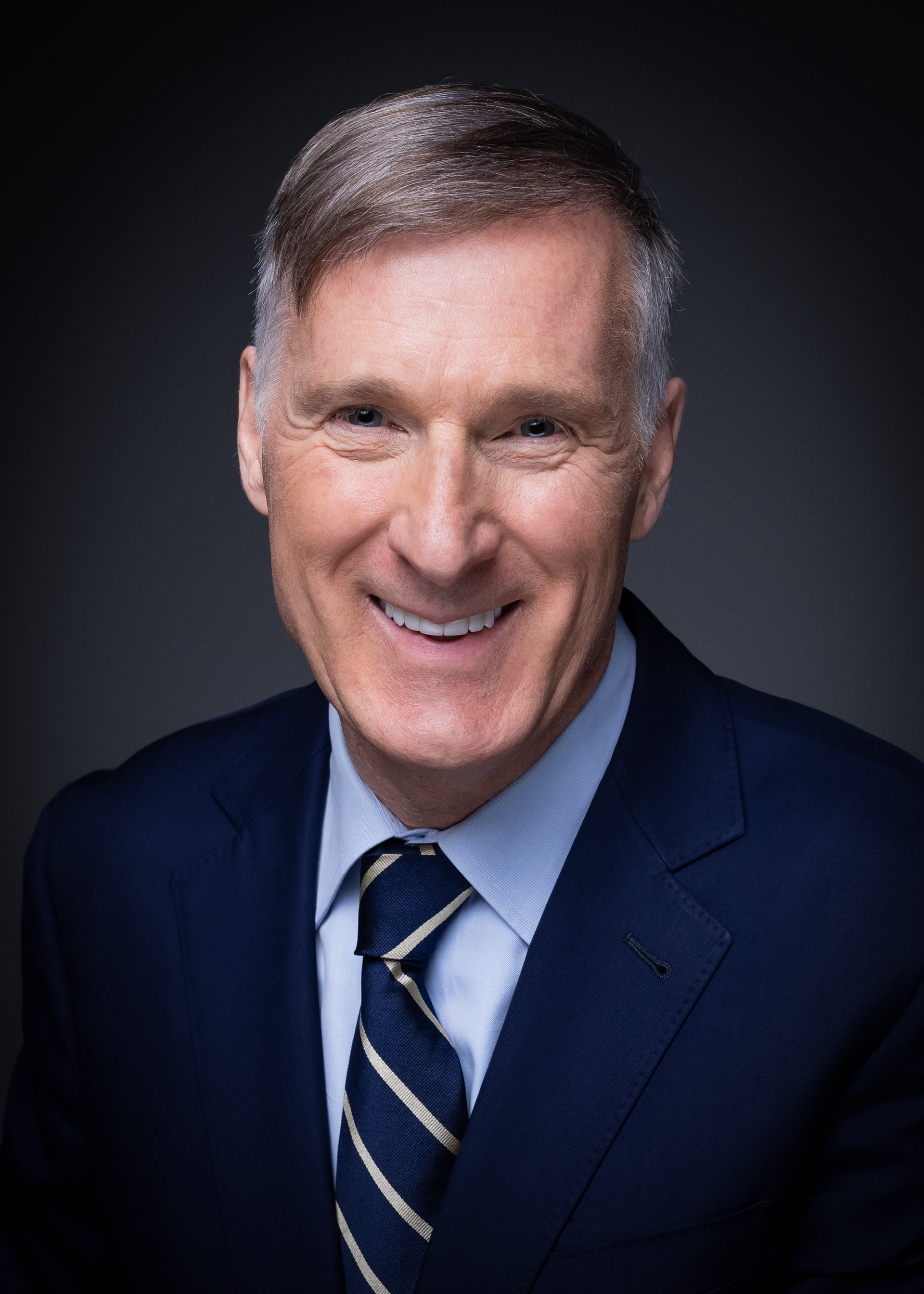
	First party	Second party	Third party
Leader	Justin Trudeau	Erin O'Toole	Yves-François Blanchet
Party	Liberal	Conservative	Bloc Québécois
Leader since	April 14, 2013	August 24, 2020	January 17, 2019
Leader's seat	Papineau	Durham	Beloeil—Chambly
Last election	157 seats, 33.12%	121 seats, 34.34%	32 seats, 7.63%
Seats before	155	119	32
Seats won	160 (Note: Includes Kevin Vuong, who appeared on the ballot as a Liberal but was disavowed by the party during the campaign. He was not seated as a member of the Liberal caucus.)	119	32
Seat change	▲5	Steady	Steady
Popular vote	5,556,629	5,747,410	1,301,615
Percentage	32.62%	33.74%	7.64%
Swing	▼0.50 pp	▼0.60 pp	▲0.01 pp
	Fourth party	Fifth party	Sixth party
Leader	Jagmeet Singh	Annamie Paul	Maxime Bernier
Party	New Democratic	Green	People's
Leader since	October 1, 2017	October 3, 2020	September 14, 2018
Leader's seat	Burnaby South	Ran in Toronto Centre (lost)	Ran in Beauce (lost)
Last election	24 seats, 15.98%	3 seats, 6.55%	0 seats, 1.62%
Seats before	24	2	0
Seats won	25	2	0
Seat change	▲1	Steady	Steady
Popular vote	3,036,348	396,988	840,993
Percentage	17.82%	2.33%	4.94%
Swing	▲1.84 pp	▼4.22 pp	▲3.32 pp
Prime Minister before election
Justin Trudeau
Liberal
Prime Minister after election
Justin Trudeau
Liberal

The 2021 Canadian federal election was held on September 20, 2021, to elect members of the House of Commons to the 44th Canadian Parliament. The writs of election were issued by Governor General Mary Simon on August 15, 2021, when Prime Minister Justin Trudeau requested the dissolution of parliament for a snap election.

Trudeau won a third term as prime minister, his second minority government. Though the Liberals were hoping to win a majority government in order to govern alone, the results were mostly unchanged from the 2019 Canadian federal election. The Liberals won the most seats at 160; as this fell short of the 170 seats needed for a majority in the House of Commons, they formed a minority government with support from other parties. The 2021 election set a new record for the lowest vote share for a party that would go on to form a single-party minority government. The election was the second one in a row where the Liberals succeeded in winning a plurality of seats despite having fewer votes than the Conservative Party. The Liberals won 32.6 per cent of the popular vote, while losing the popular vote to the Conservatives as they did in 2019.

The Conservatives led by Erin O'Toole won 119 seats, two fewer than their result in 2019, and continued as the Official Opposition. The Bloc Québécois led by Yves-François Blanchet won 32 seats, unchanged from the prior election. The New Democratic Party led by Jagmeet Singh won 25 seats, a net increase of one seat, but nonetheless fell short of expectations. The Green Party maintained two seats but party leader Annamie Paul was defeated for the third (Note: Annamie Paul lost the by-election in Toronto Centre the previous year and the 2019 general election.) time in her riding of Toronto Centre. The party received 2.3 per cent of the popular vote, approximately a third of what they won in 2019. The People's Party did not win any seats, despite winning nearly 5 per cent of the popular vote, and party leader Maxime Bernier was defeated for the second time (Note: Maxime Bernier was unseated in 2019.) in his riding of Beauce.

Trudeau faced public blowback for holding an election in the middle of a global pandemic due to his expectation that doing so could translate his supposed rallying popularity into a landslide victory. Criticism worsened when Trudeau failed to win by a majority and instead repeated his 2019 election showing. An official government probe later found that China attempted to meddle in the election to influence Canadian foreign policy.

Paul resigned as Green Party leader two months after the election, and O'Toole was ousted as Conservative leader by his party's caucus in February 2022 over the poor showing in the election and other disagreements ongoing at the time. In March 2022, the NDP and Liberals formed a confidence and supply agreement which lasted until the NDP withdrew in September 2024.

== Background ==
The 2019 Canadian federal election resulted in the Liberals, led by incumbent Prime Minister Justin Trudeau, losing both their parliamentary majority and the popular vote but nevertheless winning the most seats and remaining in office as a minority government. The Conservatives, who had gained seats and won the popular vote, continued as the Official Opposition. The Bloc Québécois regained official party status and became the third party, replacing the New Democrats in that role, with the latter party losing seats but maintaining official party status as the fourth party. Although the Greens increased their seats in the House of Commons, they ultimately failed to achieve the required number of MPs (twelve) for official party status. No other party won any seats.

In the immediate aftermath of the 2019 federal election, all leaders initially announced that they would continue as the heads of their respective parties into the 43rd Canadian Parliament. Elizabeth May said that she might not lead the Greens into the 44th federal election, and ultimately resigned as Green Party leader on November 4, 2019. On November 6, 2019, the members of the Conservative caucus decided not to adopt a measure which would have given them the ability to remove Andrew Scheer as leader; his leadership would still have been reviewed at the party's next convention, which was scheduled for April 2020. On December 12, Scheer announced his intention to resign as leader. He stayed on until his successor Erin O'Toole was chosen and remains as the MP for Regina—Qu'Appelle.

On August 15, 2021, after a request from Prime Minister Trudeau, the Governor General dissolved parliament and called an election for September 20.

=== Political parties and standings ===
The table below lists parties represented and seats held in the House of Commons after the 2019 federal election, at dissolution, and after the 2021 federal election. An expected by-election in Haldimand—Norfolk to fill the vacant seat was rendered moot by the commencement of the general election.

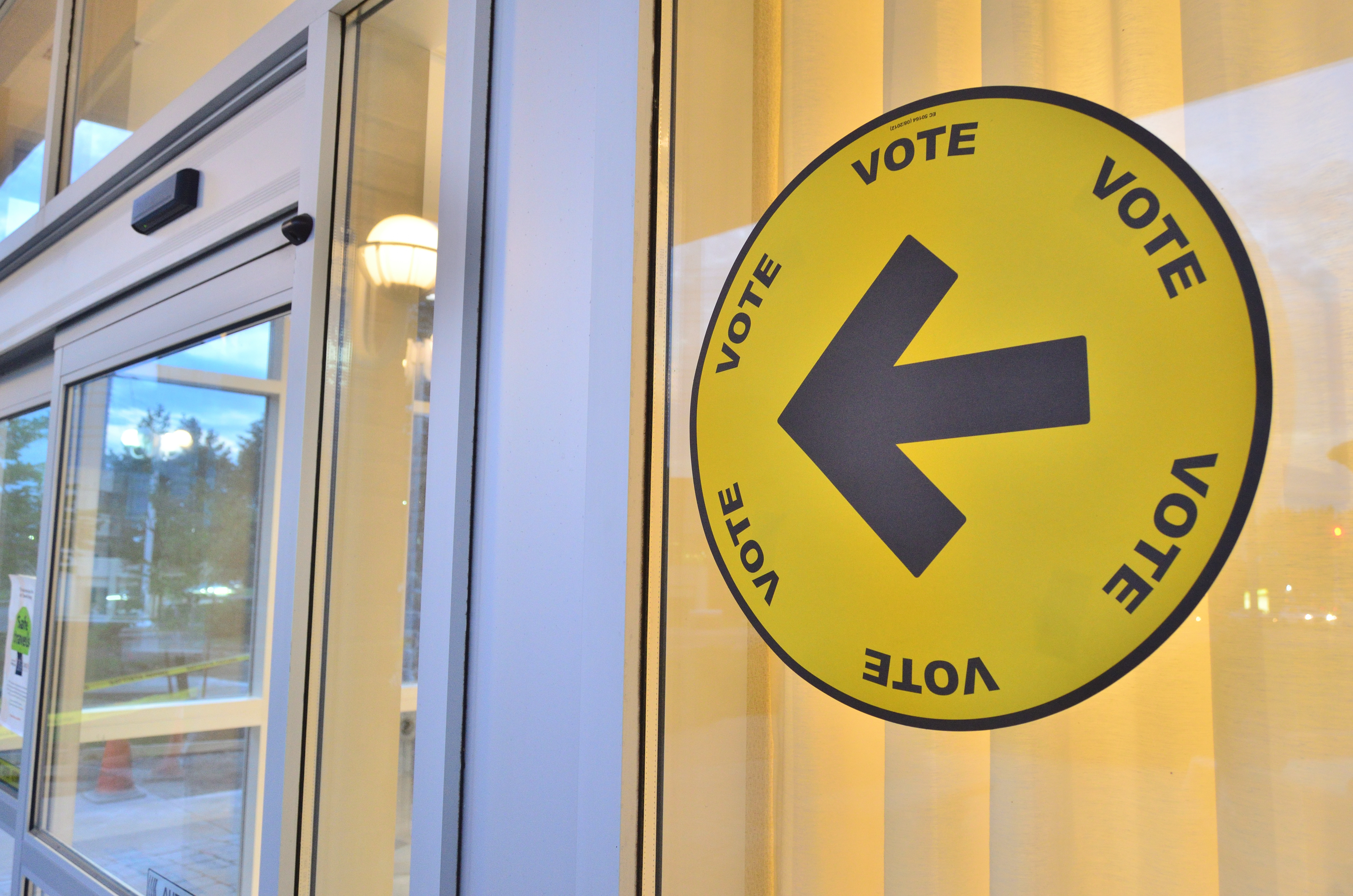
A polling station on election day

Name	Ideology	Position	Leader	2019 result		Seats at dissolution	2021 result	
Name	Ideology	Position	Leader	Votes (%)	Seats	Seats at dissolution	Votes (%)	Seats
Liberal	Liberalism; Social liberalism	Centre to centre-left	Justin Trudeau	33.12%	157 / 338	155 / 338	32.62%	160 / 338
Conservative	Conservatism; Economic liberalism; Fiscal conservatism	Centre-right to right-wing	Erin O'Toole	34.34%	121 / 338	119 / 338	33.74%	119 / 338
Bloc Québécois	Quebec nationalism; Social democracy	Centre-left	Yves-François Blanchet	7.63%	32 / 338	32 / 338	7.64%	32 / 338
New Democratic	Social democracy; Democratic socialism	Centre-left to left-wing	Jagmeet Singh	15.98%	24 / 338	24 / 338	17.82%	25 / 338
Green	Green politics		Annamie Paul	6.55%	3 / 338	2 / 338	2.33%	2 / 338
People's	Right-wing populism; Canadian nationalism; Conservatism	Right-wing to far-right	Maxime Bernier	1.62%	0 / 338	0 / 338	4.94%	0 / 338
Independents	N/A			0.41%	1 / 338	5 / 338	0.19%	0 / 338
Vacant seats	N/A			–	0 / 338	1 / 338	–	0 / 338
Source:	Elections Canada							

=== Incumbents not running for re-election ===
Below are the 31 MPs who chose not to run in the 2021 federal election.

Member of Parliament	Electoral district	Province or territory	Date announced
Will Amos	Pontiac	Quebec	August 8, 2021
Larry Bagnell	Yukon	Yukon	August 5, 2021
Navdeep Bains	Mississauga—Malton	Ontario	January 12, 2021
Lyne Bessette	Brome—Missisquoi	Quebec	July 16, 2021
Bob Bratina	Hamilton East—Stoney Creek	Ontario	May 17, 2021
Wayne Easter	Malpeque	Prince Edward Island	June 14, 2021
Pat Finnigan	Miramichi—Grand Lake	New Brunswick	June 14, 2021
Paul Lefebvre	Sudbury	Ontario	March 12, 2021
Karen McCrimmon	Kanata—Carleton	Ontario	August 8, 2021
Catherine McKenna	Ottawa Centre	Ontario	June 27, 2021
Geoff Regan	Halifax West	Nova Scotia	March 31, 2021
Gagan Sikand	Mississauga—Streetsville	Ontario	August 15, 2021
Adam Vaughan	Spadina—Fort York	Ontario	August 8, 2021
Kate Young	London West	Ontario	March 18, 2021
Steven Blaney	Bellechasse—Les Etchemins—Lévis	Quebec	July 14, 2021
Peter Kent	Thornhill	Ontario	November 19, 2020
Tom Lukiwski	Moose Jaw—Lake Centre—Lanigan	Saskatchewan	May 26, 2021
Phil McColeman	Brantford—Brant	Ontario	December 30, 2020
Cathy McLeod	Kamloops—Thompson—Cariboo	British Columbia	February 4, 2021
Bruce Stanton	Simcoe North	Ontario	June 25, 2020
David Sweet	Flamborough—Glanbrook	Ontario	January 4, 2021
David Yurdiga	Fort McMurray—Cold Lake	Alberta	August 14, 2021
Louise Charbonneau	Trois-Rivières	Quebec	January 14, 2021
Simon Marcil	Mirabel	Quebec	January 14, 2021
Scott Duvall	Hamilton Mountain	Ontario	March 5, 2021
Jack Harris	St. John's East	Newfoundland and Labrador	June 11, 2021
Mumilaaq Qaqqaq	Nunavut	Nunavut	May 20, 2021
Yasmin Ratansi (Note: Previously elected under the Liberal banner)	Don Valley East	Ontario	No announcement
Ramesh Sangha	Brampton Centre	Ontario	No announcement
Marwan Tabbara	Kitchener South—Hespeler	Ontario	No announcement
Jody Wilson-Raybould	Vancouver Granville	British Columbia	July 8, 2021

=== Incumbent not renominated ===
One MP was not renominated by his party:

Member of Parliament	Electoral district	Province or territory	Date announced
Michel Boudrias	Terrebonne	Quebec	August 4, 2021

== Timeline ==
Changes in seats held (2020–2021)
Seat	Before				Change		
Seat	Date	Member	Party	Reason	Date	Member	Party
Kitchener South—Hespeler	June 6, 2020	Marwan Tabbara	█ Liberal	Resigned from caucus (Note: Laying of assault charges unrelated to parliament)			█ Independent
Toronto Centre	August 17, 2020	Bill Morneau	█ Liberal	Resigned (Note: To pursue leadership of OECD)	October 26, 2020	Marci Ien	█ Liberal
York Centre	September 1, 2020	Michael Levitt	█ Liberal	Resigned (Note: To become a non-profit executive)	October 26, 2020	Ya'ara Saks	█ Liberal
Don Valley East	November 9, 2020	Yasmin Ratansi	█ Liberal	Resigned from caucus (Note: Revelation of nepotism in staff hiring)			█ Independent
Hastings—Lennox and Addington	January 20, 2021	Derek Sloan	█ Conservative	Expelled from caucus (Note: Accepted a political donation from white supremacist Paul Fromm)			█ Independent
Brampton Centre	January 25, 2021	Ramesh Sangha	█ Liberal	Expelled from caucus (Note: Made unsupported allegations that multiple other Liberal MPs harboured support for the Khalistan movement)			█ Independent
Haldimand—Norfolk	May 11, 2021	Diane Finley	█ Conservative	Resigned			█ Vacant
Fredericton	June 10, 2021	Jenica Atwin	█ Green	Changed affiliation			█ Liberal

=== 2019 ===
- November 4, 2019: Elizabeth May resigns as leader of the Green Party of Canada, triggering a leadership election scheduled for October 2020.
- December 12, 2019: Andrew Scheer announces his intention to step down as leader of the Conservative Party of Canada, triggering a leadership election scheduled for August 2020.

=== 2020 ===
- August 23–24, 2020: Erin O'Toole is elected leader of the Conservative Party.
- October 3, 2020: Annamie Paul is elected leader of the Green Party.

=== 2021 ===
- August 15, 2021: Parliament is dissolved and writs of election are dropped.
- September 2, 2021: First French language leaders' debate, organized by TVA Nouvelles.
- September 8, 2021: Second French language leaders' debate, organized by the Leaders' Debate Commission.
- September 9, 2021: English language leaders' debate, organized by the Leaders' Debate Commission.
- September 10–13, 2021: Advance polling.
- September 14, 2021: Last day to apply online for mail-in voting. Last day to vote by Special Ballot at a Returning Office.
- September 20, 2021: Election Day.

== Endorsements ==
Endorsements received by each party
Type	Liberal	Conservative	New Democratic	Bloc Québécois	Green	People's
Media	Toronto Star	National Post; Toronto Sun		Le Devoir		
Public figures	Hillary Clinton; Bruce Heyman; Andrew Leach; Hazel McCallion; Barack Obama; Andrew Weaver	Conrad Black; Celina Caesar-Chavannes; Rick Hillier; François Legault; Brian Lilley; Mark Norman	Cindy Blackstock; Bernie Sanders; Rashida Tlaib			Brian Peckford
Unions and business associations			United Steelworkers			

== Campaign ==
=== Early campaign (August 2021) ===
The election call occurred at the same time as the fall of Kabul, on August 15. Trudeau thus received criticism for not acting fast enough in the face of the 2021 Taliban offensive to evacuate Canadians from Afghanistan, as well as Afghans who supported Canada's military and diplomatic efforts during the War.

Criticism of Trudeau's decision to call an early election, particularly amidst the COVID-19 pandemic in Canada, was a major theme of his opponents' campaigns, and commentators noted a lack of support for a snap election amongst the public.

The beginning of the campaign proved difficult for the Liberals, who slightly fell behind the Conservatives in the polls of voting intentions. The Conservative released their platform on the second day of the campaign. The party tried to change its image with this document by putting more focus on the environment, mental health, and LGBTQ+ rights issues. Meanwhile, Trudeau attacked the new Conservative leader Erin O'Toole on the topics of compulsory vaccination for federal officials, abortion and the privatization of health care.

On August 25, Minister for Women and Gender Equality Maryam Monsef referred to the Taliban as "our brothers". Many on social media shared the video of this statement, and saw this as an indication that she felt sympathetic to the terrorist group. Monsef said that this was false, and further stated that she only chose those words because Muslims tend to refer to each other as "brothers".

On August 27, 2021, Trudeau was forced to cancel a campaign rally set for Bolton, Ontario, over security concerns arising from groups of protestors yelling obscenities at Trudeau. There were previous incidents of protesters showing up at his rallies criticizing COVID-19 vaccines and public health measures.

=== Issues on the campaign trail ===
==== Foreign policy ====
Foreign policy debates focused on China and the situation in Afghanistan. For Afghanistan, discussions focused on ways to mitigate the immediate humanitarian crisis facing the country. The group Canadian Campaign for Afghan Peace launched an open letter on August 17 calling on political parties to take position of the new situation in Afghanistan.

The campaign took place during the extradition case of Meng Wanzhou, which had exacerbated tensions between Canada and China. O'Toole accused Trudeau of being "weak on China", and promised to scale up Canada's hostility towards the country if elected.

According to Shadwick Martin, the tendency to relegate defence and foreign policy to minor appearances continued in 2021. He argues that the Liberals did not deviate from their government's existing foreign policy, while the Conservatives produced a lengthy list of reforms that one commentator described as "scattered and unfocused". The NDP's propositions were essentially unchanged from 2019.

==== Climate change ====
As in 2019, climate change was a major issue in the campaign. In March 2021, Conservative leader O'Toole announced a carbon pricing plan to replace the current Liberal carbon tax, despite previous Conservative opposition to any form of a carbon tax. There was thus a broad consensus among all represented parties for policies to mitigate climate change, although they differed in the emissions targets, the level of the carbon tax, and the transition path to a clean economy. Only the People's Party opposed all climate change policies and vowed to withdraw from the Paris climate accord.

==== COVID-19 ====
The COVID-19 pandemic was a major campaign issue. The Liberal party sought to defend its pandemic response, while trying to tie Erin O'Toole to Alberta Premier Jason Kenney. O'Toole always sidestepped questions about his previous support for Kenney's pandemic response by saying he would work with any premier to face the pandemic regardless of their political stripes. During the campaign, Alberta was experiencing its worst wave of the pandemic in terms of hospitalisations.

Meanwhile, other parties explained what they would have done differently had they been in a similar situation. The Bloc Québecois criticized the amount of money invested in Federal aid for workers, especially the Canada Emergency Response Benefit (CERB). The NDP, on the other hand, criticized the government's "aggressive" crackdown on possibly fraudulent CERB claims, while calling for clawing back wage subsidy payments to companies who fired their workers while received this benefit. The People's Party was the only party opposing vaccine passports, mask mandates and lockdowns.

==== Gun control ====
In September 2021, O'Toole changed his position on gun control. Reverting from his initial promise of repealing Prime Minister Trudeau's May 2020 ban on assault weapons, he changed his stance on the issue, promising that he would not repeal the ban. Political commentators and analysts described O'Toole's leadership as shifting the Conservative Party to the political centre.

==== Implosion of the Green Party ====
The Green Party of Canada experienced a period of infighting beginning in June 2021, when Jenica Atwin, one of its three MPs, crossed the floor to join the Liberal Party over a dispute regarding the 2021 Israel–Palestine crisis. Although there were calls for the party leader Annamie Paul to resign, she stayed on as leader through the federal election. She spent the majority of the election campaigning in her chosen riding of Toronto Centre, but failed to win the seat.

==== Rise of the People's Party ====
The campaign was also marked by a rise in support for the People's Party of Canada. Before the election, Mainstreet Research gave the party more than 8 per cent of the vote, and Abacus Data noted particularly high scores among Canadians under the age of 60. Justin Trudeau and Yves-François Blanchet indirectly accused the Conservatives for the rise of the PPC, with Trudeau notably criticizing Erin O'Toole for not requiring his party's candidates to be vaccinated.

=== Campaign slogans ===
Party	English	French (translation)
Liberal Party of Canada	"Forward. For Everyone."	"Avançons ensemble." ("Let's move forward together.")
Conservative Party of Canada	"Secure the Future"	"Agir pour l'avenir." ("Act for the Future.")
New Democratic Party	"Fighting for You"	"Oser ensemble" ("Dare Together")
Bloc Québécois	N/A	"Québécois" ("Quebec", in its adjective form)
Green Party of Canada	"Be Daring."	"Faites le saut." ("Take the Leap.") and "Il faut de l'audace." ("It takes boldness.")

=== Policy platforms ===
Party	Full platform
█ Liberal	Forward. For Everyone.
█ Conservative	Canada's Recovery Plan
█ New Democratic	Ready for Better
█ Bloc Québécois	Québécois
█ Green	Platform 2021 - Be Daring
█ People's	Our Platform

=== Platform evaluations ===
The Parliamentary Budget Officer provides a service to all parties for evaluating the financial impact of any of their proposals, but does not release details until the requesting party has done so as well. After the election, the PBO revealed that 130 requests had been received from all parties, of which only 72 were made public. It did release a report outlining various baselines that were used in its costing exercises.

The Institute of Fiscal Studies and Democracy at the University of Ottawa announced that their analysis of fiscal credibility showed the Liberal party had the best grade, as shown by the following ratings:

IFSD party platform rankings, 2021 (Good = ✓, Pass =, Fail = ✗)
Party	Overall score	Realistic economic and fiscal assumptions	Responsible fiscal management	Transparency
█ Liberal	✓	✓	✓	✓
█ Conservative	check	✓	✗	✓
█ New Democratic	check	✓	check	✗

=== Leaders' debates ===
In June 2020, the Leaders' Debates Commission released its report reviewing the 2019 election debates and making recommendations for future debates. The report recommended a permanent and publicly funded commission be tasked with organizing two debates for every federal election. It also called for the commission, not the government, to set the criteria for participation in future election debates.

The English-language debate gained notoriety when the moderator posed a question to Blanchet that characterized Quebec's law on secularism as "discriminatory". He challenged her use of that word, and the response was seen by some as a turning point in the Bloc's campaign, which gained in the polls after the debate.

2021 Canadian general election debates
Date	Organizers	Location	Language	Moderator	P Participant A Absent (invited) I Invited N Not invited						Source
Date	Organizers	Location	Language	Moderator	Trudeau	O'Toole	Blanchet	Singh	Paul	Bernier	Source
September 2, 2021	TVA Nouvelles	Montreal	French	Pierre Bruneau	P	P	P	P	N	N	
September 8, 2021	Leaders' Debates Commission	Canadian Museum of History, Gatineau	French	Patrice Roy	P	P	P	P	P	N	
September 9, 2021	Leaders' Debates Commission	Canadian Museum of History, Gatineau	English	Shachi Kurl	P	P	P	P	P	N	

On August 29, Ici Radio-Canada Télé hosted a special broadcast consisting of a series of solo interviews with each leader in turn, with questions posed by Patrice Roy, Céline Galipeau and Anne-Marie Dussault. This format was not attempted by any of the other broadcasters.

== Opinion polls ==
Evolution of voting intentions according to polls conducted during the campaign period of the 2021 Canadian federal election. Trendlines are 25-poll local regressions, with polls weighted by proximity in time and a logarithmic function of sample size. 95 per cent confidence ribbons represent uncertainty about the trendlines, not the likelihood that actual election results would fall within the intervals.

Evolution of voting intentions according to polls conducted during the pre-campaign period of the 2021 Canadian federal election. Trendlines are 30-poll local regressions, with polls weighted by proximity in time and a logarithmic function of sample size. 95 per cent confidence ribbons represent uncertainty about the trendlines, not the likelihood that actual election results would fall within the intervals.

=== Polls in key provinces ===
Voter intentions through the course of the campaign
Alberta

British Columbia

Ontario

Quebec

== Results ==
=== Summary results ===
Pie chart of popular vote and seat counts

=== Full results ===
The Liberals maintained their status as largest party in the House of Commons. The results were very close to those of the 2019 federal election.

Summary of the 2021 Canadian federal election
Party	Party leader	Candidates	Seats					Popular vote				
Party	Party leader	Candidates	2019	Dissol.	2021	Change from 2019	% seats	Votes	Vote change	%	pp change	% where running
Liberal	Justin Trudeau	338 (Note: Includes Kitchener Centre candidate Raj Saini who withdrew, and Spadina—Fort York candidate Kevin Vuong who was removed as a candidate, both after the deadline for candidate registration, and thus remained on the ballot as Liberals.)	157	155	160	▲3	47.34%	5,556,629	▼462,099	32.62%	▼0.50pp	32.62%
Conservative	Erin O'Toole	337 (Note: Includes Beaches—East York candidate Lisa Robinson, who was removed as a candidate after the deadline for candidate registration and thus remained on the ballot as a Conservative. The Conservatives did not run a candidate in Dartmouth—Cole Harbour after their nominee withdrew shortly before the registration deadline.)	121	119	119	▼2	35.21%	5,747,410	▼491,817	33.74%	▼0.60pp	33.83%
Bloc Québécois	Yves-François Blanchet	78	32	32	32	Steady	9.47%	1,301,615	▼85,415	7.64%	▲0.01pp	32.11%
New Democratic	Jagmeet Singh	338 (Note: Includes Toronto—St. Paul's candidate Sidney Coles and Cumberland—Colchester candidate Daniel Osborne, who both withdrew after the deadline for candidate registration and thus remained on the ballot as New Democrats.)	24	24	25	▲1	7.40%	3,036,348	▲132,626	17.82%	▲1.84pp	17.82%
Green	Annamie Paul	252 (Note: Includes Renfrew—Nipissing—Pembroke candidate Michael Lariviere, who was removed as a candidate after the deadline for candidate registration and thus remained on the ballot as a Green.)	3	2	2	▼1	0.59%	396,988	▼792,619	2.33%	▼4.22pp	3.07%
People's	Maxime Bernier	312	–	–	–			840,993	▲546,901	4.94%	▲3.32pp	5.31%
Free (D)	Michel Leclerc	59	—N/a	–	–			47,252	—N/a	0.28%	—N/a	1.49%
Maverick (D)	Jay D. Hill (interim)	29	—N/a	–	–			35,178	—N/a	0.21%	—N/a	2.30%
Independent and No Affiliation		91	1	5	–	▼1		32,481	▼41,810	0.19%	▼0.22pp	0.69%
Christian Heritage	Rodney L. Taylor	25	–	–	–			8,985	▼9,916	0.05%	▼0.05pp	0.67%
Rhinoceros	Sébastien CoRhino	27	–	–	–			6,085	▼3,453	0.04%	▼0.01pp	0.41%
Libertarian	Jacques Boudreau	13	–	–	–			4,765	▼3,602	0.03%	▼0.02pp	0.71%
Communist	Elizabeth Rowley	26	–	–	–			4,700	▲795	0.03%	▲0.01pp	0.36%
Marxist–Leninist	Anna Di Carlo	36	–	–	–			4,532	▲408	0.03%	▲0.01pp	0.26%
Pour l'Indépendance du Québec (D)	Michel Blondin	10	–	–	–			2,934	▼881	0.02%	Steady	0.51%
Animal Protection	Liz White	10	–	–	–			2,546	▼1,862	0.01%	▼0.01pp	0.48%
Marijuana	Blair T. Longley	9	–	–	–			2,031	▲1,111	0.01%	Steady	0.42%
Veterans Coalition (D)	Randy David Joy	7	–	–	–			1,246	▼5,054	0.01%	▼0.02pp	0.30%
Centrist	A.Q. Rana	4	—N/a	–	–			648	—N/a	0.00%	—N/a	0.40%
National Citizens Alliance (D)	Stephen J. Garvey	4	–	–	–			476	▼34	0.00%	Steady	0.22%
Patriote (D)	Carl Brochu	2	—N/a	–	–			244	—N/a	0.00%	—N/a	0.21%
Canada's Fourth Front (Note: Canada's Fourth Front changed its name to Direct Democracy Party of Canada shortly after the election.) (D)	Partap Dua	2	–	–	–			105	▼577	0.00%	Steady	0.09%
Canadian Nationalist (D)	Gus Stefanis	1	–	–	–			52	▼229	0.00%	Steady	0.14%
Vacant				1	—N/a							
Total valid votes								17,034,243	▼1,136,637	100.00%	–	–
Total rejected ballots								175,568	▼3,697	1.02%	▲0.04pp	–
**Total**		**2,010**	**338**	**338**	**338**	–	**100.00%**	**17,209,811**	▼**1,140,334**	**100.00%**	–	**100.00%**
Electorate (eligible voters)/turnout								27,366,297	▼6,761	62.89%	▼4.14pp	–
Source: House of Commons, validated and judicial recount results; full results spreadsheet (D) indicates a party deregistered before the next election

=== Results by province ===
Distribution of seats and popular vote %, by party by province/territory (2021)
Party name		BC	AB	SK	MB	ON	QC	NB	NS	PE	NL	YT	NT	NU	Total
Liberal	Seats:	15	2	–	4	78	35	6	8	4	6	1	1	–	160
Liberal	Vote:	27.0	15.5	10.6	27.9	39.3	33.6	42.4	42.3	46.2	47.7	33.4	38.2	35.9	32.6
Conservative	Seats:	13	30	14	7	37	10	4	3	–	1	–	–	–	119
Conservative	Vote:	33.2	55.3	59.0	39.2	34.9	18.6	33.6	29.4	31.6	32.5	26.3	14.4	16.5	33.7
NDP	Seats:	13	2	–	3	5	1	–	–	–	–	–	–	1	25
NDP	Vote:	29.2	19.1	21.1	23.0	17.8	9.8	11.9	22.1	9.2	17.4	22.4	32.3	47.7	17.8
Bloc Québécois	Seats:						32								32
Bloc Québécois	Vote:						32.1								7.6
People's	Seats:	–	–	–	–	–	–	–	–	–	–	–	–	–	–
People's	Vote:	4.9	7.4	6.6	7.6	5.5	2.7	6.1	4.0	3.2	2.4	–	–	–	4.9
Green	Seats:	1	–	–	–	1	–	–	–	–	–	–	–	–	2
Green	Vote:	5.3	0.9	1.1	1.7	2.2	1.5	5.2	1.9	9.6	-	4.4	2.3	-	2.3
Independents and minor parties	Seats:	–	–	–	–	–	–	–	–	–	–	–	–	–	–
Independents and minor parties	Vote:	0.4	1.9	1.6	0.7	0.3	1.6	0.8	0.3	0.2	-	13.6	12.7	–	0.2
Seats:		42	34	14	14	121	78	10	11	4	7	1	1	1	338

=== Turnout analysis ===
Change in voter turnout, by gender and prov/terr (2021 vs 2019)
Prov/Terr	Women		Men		All	
NL	54.2	-6.2	50.5	-5.3	52.4	-5.8
PE	74.9	-2.8	70.5	-2.6	72.8	-2.6
NS	66.9	-6.5	62.2	-6.9	64.6	-6.8
NB	66.9	-7.2	63.3	-7.6	65.2	-7.3
QC	66.0	-3.6	61.9	-4.1	64.0	-3.8
ON	62.6	-5.1	60.1	-4.8	61.4	-5.0
MB	63.3	-1.7	59.8	-2.3	61.6	-2.0
SK	65.1	-7.6	62.3	-7.7	63.7	-7.7
AB	64.8	-4.9	61.1	-6.4	62.9	-5.7
BC	62.7	-3.9	59.7	-4.6	61.2	-4.3
YT	65.9	-6.2	59.5	-7.4	62.7	-6.8
NT	46.6	-6.1	41.4	-7.0	44.0	-6.5
NU	31.1	-11.2	27.7	-9.3	29.4	-10.2
Canada	63.8	-4.7	60.6	-4.9	62.2	-4.8

Change in voter turnout, by gender, age group and prov/terr (2021 vs 2019)
Women
Age group	18–24		25–34		35–44		45–54		55–64		65–74		75+	
NL	33.2	-11.2	40.1	-10.9	48.4	-8.3	53.3	-7.0	61.8	-4.9	68.3	-3.4	58.5	-1.7
PE	46.3	-15.6	64.9	-3.8	73.5	-2.6	77.4	-1.9	84.4	0.1	86.8	-0.3	78.1	1.4
NS	51.1	-9.8	58.5	-7.5	62.0	-8.3	65.6	-7.8	74.0	-6.2	79.7	-4.3	66.9	-3.8
NB	46.4	-13.4	54.9	-9.8	63.5	-8.6	66.9	-8.3	74.1	-6.5	79.1	-4.9	69.1	-2.5
QC	55.1	-5.0	57.2	-4.0	62.2	-4.9	66.6	-3.1	71.7	-4.5	77.8	-3.1	64.4	-1.1
ON	50.1	-8.7	54.5	-6.1	59.2	-6.3	64.4	-4.8	68.4	-4.9	73.8	-4.2	63.5	-1.9
MB	46.5	-5.2	52.8	-3.1	59.2	-2.2	64.9	-1.4	71.5	-1.9	77.8	-1.0	68.4	1.6
SK	44.5	-11.8	56.0	-9.4	63.0	-8.7	67.1	-7.8	73.1	-7.8	79.3	-5.2	68.9	-3.2
AB	51.1	-6.3	59.0	-5.8	62.2	-6.1	67.6	-5.1	71.5	-5.0	75.3	-3.7	65.0	-2.4
BC	49.3	-6.9	56.1	-4.5	59.6	-5.7	62.7	-4.2	67.4	-4.2	74.4	-2.9	62.9	0.1
YT	39.6	-12.0	66.6	-7.5	65.0	-7.4	66.3	-4.4	69.6	-6.4	75.6	-4.5	71.7	0.8
NT	26.5	-3.4	45.7	-4.4	47.0	-7.5	51.2	-7.6	53.2	-6.2	52.5	-11.8	48.5	0.5
NU	13.4	-13.1	27.3	-12.9	31.6	-14.3	39.0	-9.7	44.0	-6.9	48.8	-6.7	45.8	5.5
Canada	50.5	-7.5	55.8	-5.5	60.5	-5.9	65.0	-4.5	69.8	-4.8	75.6	-3.6	64.3	-1.4
Men
NL	27.9	-8.8	34.9	-8.4	45.0	-6.1	47.9	-5.8	56.9	-4.6	66.6	-3.3	61.1	-4.6
PE	40.2	-11.9	58.2	-3.3	70.2	-1.7	73.6	-0.4	81.7	0.5	83.1	-1.9	76.0	-1.0
NS	40.2	-10.0	49.5	-8.6	58.2	-6.9	61.4	-7.4	69.9	-6.5	77.6	-4.9	69.5	-6.1
NB	39.8	-11.5	48.4	-10.0	60.1	-8.4	63.6	-7.8	70.7	-7.2	78.0	-5.1	69.5	-5.9
QC	46.3	-5.6	50.5	-3.6	57.4	-4.3	62.3	-3.2	67.4	-5.0	75.4	-4.7	68.1	-4.2
ON	43.1	-6.8	49.3	-5.4	57.1	-4.9	62.9	-3.9	66.2	-5.1	73.3	-5.0	67.5	-5.1
MB	40.0	-4.8	48.5	-3.4	56.5	-1.5	62.1	-1.6	68.2	-2.0	76.0	-2.3	70.1	-2.5
SK	40.6	-10.9	52.2	-9.5	61.3	-8.3	64.2	-7.7	69.8	-7.5	77.5	-5.6	69.9	-6.3
AB	44.9	-6.9	53.0	-7.5	58.8	-7.2	64.1	-6.5	68.0	-6.2	73.9	-5.3	68.2	-5.3
BC	41.2	-6.9	49.3	-5.5	57.1	-5.7	61.5	-3.5	64.4	-5.0	73.3	-4.0	66.3	-3.1
YT	30.6	-9.7	53.9	-10.3	61.3	-6.7	63.9	-5.5	62.5	-7.6	69.2	-8.9	71.2	0.2
NT	18.8	-6.4	36.4	-3.6	42.5	-8.3	50.1	-7.2	49.1	-10.1	47.4	-11.3	46.1	-2.0
NU	8.8	-10.6	19.8	-10.7	28.3	-11.7	36.2	-8.7	43.2	-6.3	50.7	-9.0	50.3	3.5
Canada	43.1	-6.8	49.9	-5.6	57.5	-5.2	62.5	-4.2	66.7	-5.2	74.3	-4.6	67.7	-4.6

=== Special ballots in the election ===
Special ballot voting kits issued and returned
Reason	Issued	Returned
Voting by mail or at an Elections Canada office from inside their riding	1,014,708	899,819
Voting by mail or at an Elections Canada office from outside their riding	199,629	151,117
Living outside of Canada	55,700	27,253
Total	1,270,037	1,078,189

=== Judicial recounts ===
In a federal election, a judicial recount is automatically ordered in a riding where the margin of victory is less than 0.1 per cent (one one-thousandth) of the votes cast. In cases where there is a larger but still narrow margin of victory, an elector can request a judicial recount. While no validated results triggered an automatic recount in this election, judicial recounts were requested in four ridings: Brome—Missisquoi, Davenport, Châteauguay—Lacolle and Trois-Rivières. Only Châteauguay—Lacolle saw its initial result overturned: the recount had Liberal incumbent MP Brenda Shanahan proclaimed the ultimate winner over Bloc candidate Patrick O'Hara, by a margin of only 12 votes. It was the first time validated results were reversed by a judicial recount since the 2008 election. Recounts in Brome—Missiquoi and Davenport began on October 12; however, in both ridings the early count appeared to confirm the initial validated results, leading both challengers to concede defeat and the recount to be terminated.

Riding	Initial validated results, first and second place			Recount start date	Judicially certified results, first and second place		
Riding	Candidate	Votes	%	Recount start date	Candidate	Votes	%
Châteauguay—Lacolle, Quebec	Patrick O'Hara, BQ	18,028	36.98%	October 4, 2021	Brenda Shanahan, Liberal	18,029	37.03%
Châteauguay—Lacolle, Quebec	Brenda Shanahan, Liberal	17,742	36.39%	October 4, 2021	Patrick O'Hara, BQ	18,017	37.01%
Trois-Rivières, Quebec	René Villemure, BQ	17,119	29.51%	October 5, 2021	René Villemure, BQ	17,136	29.49%
Trois-Rivières, Quebec	Yves Lévesque, Conservative	17,027	29.35%	October 5, 2021	Yves Lévesque, Conservative	17,053	29.35%
Brome—Missisquoi, Quebec	Pascale St-Onge, Liberal	21,488	34.96%	October 12, 2021 (terminated)	Judicial recount terminated at the request of the candidate who had requested it		
Brome—Missisquoi, Quebec	Marilou Alarie, BQ	21,291	34.64%	October 12, 2021 (terminated)	Judicial recount terminated at the request of the candidate who had requested it		
Davenport, Ontario	Julie Dzerowicz, Liberal	19,930	42.13%	October 12, 2021 (terminated)	Judicial recount terminated at the request of the candidate who had requested it		
Davenport, Ontario	Alejandra Bravo, NDP	19,854	41.97%	October 12, 2021 (terminated)	Judicial recount terminated at the request of the candidate who had requested it		

Initially, the preliminary results of Charleswood—St. James—Assiniboia—Headingley in the province of Manitoba were so close that the Liberal former MP Doug Eyolfson had just 24 votes fewer than the Conservative incumbent MP Marty Morantz, a margin small enough to trigger an automatic recount. On September 28, Eyolfson conceded after the validated results had widened the gap to 460 votes, which is approximately 1 per cent of the total vote.

=== 10 closest ridings ===
Incumbents are denoted in bold and followed by (I).

Riding	Winner	Runner-up	Vote difference
Châteauguay—Lacolle	**Brenda Shanahan (I)**	Patrick O'Hara	12
Davenport	**Julie Dzerowicz (I)**	Alejandra Bravo	76
Trois-Rivières	René Villemure	Yves Levesque	83
Brome—Missisquoi	Pascale St-Onge	Marilou Alarie	197
Sault Ste. Marie	**Terry Sheehan (I)**	Sonny Spina	247
Coast of Bays—Central—Notre Dame	Clifford Small	**Scott Simms (I)**	281
Vancouver Granville	Taleeb Noormohamed	Anjali Appadurai	431
Charleswood—St. James—Assiniboia—Headingley	**Marty Morantz (I)**	Doug Eyolfson	460
Fredericton	**Jenica Atwin (I)**	Andrea Johnson	502
Kitchener—Conestoga	**Tim Louis (I)**	Carlene Hawley	577

=== Maps ===
Elections Canada 2021 results

Map showing results by riding

Cartogram of the 2021 Canadian federal election results using equal-area ridings

== Analysis and aftermath ==
Ternary plots - shift of electoral support (2019-2021)
2019

2021
Electoral districts identified by colours of winning parties

The remarkable similarity of the results and those of the 2019 federal election may have reinforced voters' sentiments that the early election was unnecessary, and its meagre results have left their mark on the electorate. A survey by Maru Public Opinion revealed that 77 per cent of respondents believe that Canada is more divided than ever, and 52 per cent feel that Canada's democratic system is broken.

=== Political parties ===
Several factors were quickly identified as having had a significant influence on the results. Some political scientists and commentators debated whether the PPC's better performance, compared to the 2019 federal election, contributed to the Conservatives under Erin O'Toole losing to the Liberals. Mainstreet Research CEO Quito Maggi and University of Toronto political science professor Nelson Wiseman posited that the PPC may have cost the Conservatives at least ten ridings. The votes obtained by PPC candidates were larger than the margin of victory in 21 ridings, where the Conservative candidate was in second place (12 in Ontario, five in BC, two in Alberta, one in Quebec and one in Newfoundland). Of those seats, 14 went to the Liberals, six to the NDP, and one to the Bloc; however, it has been described as not a simple generalization, as a significant amount of PPC support arose from non-Conservative voters.

Important vote swings to the Liberals were also noted in ridings with significant Chinese-Canadian populations, with especially large ones arising in Aurora—Oak Ridges—Richmond Hill and Richmond Centre. This was predicted early on in the campaign in polling by Mainstreet Research, which observed that they "were not supporting Conservative candidates in the same way they did in the last couple of elections." While some commentators believed that this may have arisen because of the manner the Tories were handling China-Canada issues, others wondered whether the abnormally large changes were due to disinformation activity occurring in the local Chinese-language media.

Even before the mail-in ballots were counted, the Liberals were projected as leading in 158 seats despite seeing their vote share fall from 33.1 per cent to 32.3 per cent. Gerald Butts, former principal secretary to Trudeau, praised the result as a "smart campaign" that prioritized "vote efficiency"; this view was criticized as detracting from other essential aspects of an election campaign. Other commentators questioned whether the Liberal vote has reached its effective limit, commenting that minority governments have occurred with greater frequency since the Unite the Right movement and the formation of the Conservative Party in 2003.

Had he not been ousted by his caucus, O'Toole would have faced a mandatory leadership review at the next Conservative national conference in 2023. A member of the national council quickly called for a petition to accelerate the process. Other Conservatives urged continued support of O'Toole, and called for the party to unify around him. Most party and caucus members seemed to have appeared to favour a post-mortem review along the lines conducted by the party after the 2004 federal election.

The Green Party saw its share of the vote collapse to 2.3 per cent, its lowest level since the 2000 federal election. Internal dissension and poor morale contributed to the decline, and Elizabeth May called for an inquiry to determine the underlying reasons for it. Paul announced her resignation as party leader on September 27.

=== Calls for electoral reform ===
Commentators at The Conversation noted that for a second election in a row the Liberals won the greatest number of seats but lost the popular vote to the Conservatives under the first-past-the-post (FPTP) voting system. During the campaign, Trudeau said he remains open to getting rid of Canada's FPTP if re-elected, provided there is consensus on the issue; he also expressed his preference for ranked voting over proportional representation. Trudeau had promised during the 2015 campaign that the 2015 federal election would be the last federal election to use FPTP.

=== Western alienation and separatism ===
In the lead-up to the 2021 federal election, western alienation was seen as a potentially disruptive force, particularly in Alberta and Saskatchewan. The Wexit Party, led by former Conservative MP Jay Hill, positioned itself as a western separatist alternative to the federal Conservatives, drawing comparisons to the Bloc Québécois. The party changed its name to the Maverick Party in September 2020.

Support for western separatism rose during 2020, with polling showing as much as 45–48% support for independence in Alberta. However, media attention toward the movement and the party declined after the rebranding. There was inconsistency about whether to treat the Maverick Party as a major party, with some outlets—such as 338Canada— including it in regional projections.

Caught off guard by the early election call, the party managed to nominate only 29 candidates, primarily in Conservative strongholds in Alberta and Saskatchewan. Though they had also nominated a few in British Columbia and Manitoba. Some analysts suggested that the People's Party of Canada attracted part of the Maverick Party's potential voter base. The Maverick Party ultimately received just 0.21% of the national popular vote. However, in the ridings where it fielded candidates, it received approximately 2.3% of the vote and outperformed the Green Party in Alberta and Saskatchewan.

After the election, western separatist sentiment appeared to wane. Some Maverick Party members were involved in the 2022 "Freedom Convoy" protests. The party's public activity declined afterward, and it formally dissolved in early 2025, citing lack of electoral success and organizational challenges.

=== Candidates elected ===
Forty-nine MPs were elected for the first time, and two more (Randy Boissonnault and John Aldag) returned after having been defeated in 2019. The number of female MPs—103, up from 100 in 2019—is a record high for the House, and 22 of the first-time MPs are women.

Kevin Vuong, whose candidacy was disavowed by the Liberals after nominations had closed, still won the riding of Spadina—Fort York. Vuong announced that he would take his seat as an independent upon being sworn in. Adam Vaughan, the previous incumbent, called on Vuong to resign as his victory was "compromised". In a radio interview in November, Vuong apologized to his supporters, and he later said, "Of the many, many people who have reached out since my interview, they've encouraged me to move forward. And that's what I'm going to be doing."

George Chahal, elected in Calgary Skyview, was the subject of several complaints concerning the removal of campaign flyers of another candidate, substituting them with his own. In January 2022, he accepted and paid a $500 administrative monetary penalty assessed by the Commissioner of Canada Elections in the matter, saying, "It's just a late night on an election campaign. Call it a dumb mistake or brain fog—it really doesn't matter why I did what I did. I think what matters is I did it. And I acknowledged it fully, openly, publicly."

=== Chinese government interference ===
A year following the election, Conservative Party politicians including former leader Erin O'Toole blamed Chinese government interference as a factor behind the loss for the party. In a 2022 interview on the UnCommons podcast with Nathaniel Erskine-Smith, O'Toole opined that media outfits linked to the Chinese Communist Party could have cost the Conservatives up to "eight or nine seats."

O'Toole's beliefs were supported by Conservative MP and foreign affairs critic Michael Chong who stated that while the party was initially hesitant to blame China for influencing the vote due to inconclusive evidence at the time, he now believed "The communist leadership in Beijing did interfere in the last federal election by spreading disinformation through proxies on Chinese-language social media platforms that contributed to the defeat of a number of Conservative MPs" citing a report by McGill University. Similar views were shared by O'Toole's director of parliamentary affairs Mitch Heimpel who claimed Canadian national security officers had contacted the Conservatives around election day to express concerns about potential foreign interference. Heimpel also cited the example of former Conservative MP Kenny Chiu who had been targeted by a misinformation campaign by the Chinese social media platform WeChat. Research into alleged electoral interference by McGill University indicated that there was no specific riding specific data to draw a full conclusion on the impact of potential interference and noted "Canadian-Chinese issues were not central to the campaign nor were they top of mind for voters" but concurred researchers had found Chinese state media had worked "with an apparent aim to convince Canadians of Chinese origin to vote against the Conservative Party."

In February 2023, The Globe and Mail published a series of articles, reporting that the Canadian Security Intelligence Service (CSIS), in several classified documents, advised that China had employed disinformation campaigns and undisclosed donations to support preferred candidates during the campaign, all with the aim of ensuring that the Liberals would win again, but only with a minority. Other illegal tactics under the Canada Elections Act were also revealed, such as directing international students to work for preferred candidates (ostensibly as volunteers, but being paid by sympathetic business owners), and arranging for sympathetic donors to contribute to such campaigns, with the difference between their payments and the resulting tax credits being returned to them. The Procedure and House Affairs Committee of the House of Commons met to discuss these reports, and voted to expand their current inquiry into the 2019 election to include the 2021 election as well. In April 2024, an inquiry into foreign interference heard that CSIS concluded in February 2023 that the Chinese government interfered in the 2019 and 2021 elections.

=== Canadian Election Study ===
The 2021 Canadian Election Study (CES) comprised two phases: a Campaign Period Survey (CPS) and a Post-Election Survey (PES). The CPS involved three components—"CPS," "CPS Modules," and "CPS Oversample"—which were consolidated into a final dataset of 20,968 respondents. Data collection for the CPS was conducted between August 17 and September 19, 2021. The PES followed shortly after, occurring from September 23 to October 4, 2021, and yielded a sample size of 15,069.

The survey's core questions were adapted from prior iterations of the CES to maintain consistency and focus on key topics, including voting intentions, demographics, issue positions, partisanship, and political engagement.

The 2021 CES was directed by a team of researchers: Laura Stephenson, Allison Harell, Daniel Rubenson, and Peter Loewen.

The data presented include questions from the CPS and PES, cross-tabulated with 2021 voting preferences. The weights applied to the data were adjusted to align with the actual results of the 2021 Canadian federal election.

==== Demographics ====
CES demographic analysis of voters
Group/subgroup	Party						
Group/subgroup	Lib	Con	NDP	BQ	Green	PPC	Other
Total Vote	32.6	33.7	17.8	7.6	2.3	4.9	0.9
Gender
Men	30.9	38.2	13.1	9.7	1.9	5.2	1.1
Women	34.5	29.1	22.7	5.4	2.8	4.7	0.7
Age
18-29	28.7	19.9	36.3	5.4	3.2	5.8	0.7
30-39	33.0	28.8	21.7	6.0	2.5	6.5	1.4
40-49	31.5	30.7	17.8	9.0	2.9	7.0	1.2
50-59	34.2	37.4	12.9	8.1	1.6	4.8	1.0
60-69	33.5	37.3	12.3	10.2	1.9	4.0	0.8
70-79	33.8	43.5	10.0	7.8	1.7	2.6	0.6
80+	34.7	49.3	8.7	3.8	2.6	0.9	0.0
Language
English	34.4	36.3	20.2	0.4	2.5	5.4	0.8
French	25.8	23.6	8.6	36.0	1.6	3.2	1.2
Highest Education Attainment
High School or Less	28.9	36.2	18.1	8.8	2.1	4.8	1.1
College	30.2	34.6	17.9	7.3	2.4	6.7	0.8
University	41.3	28.7	17.3	6.0	2.6	3.3	0.7
Religion
Atheist	30.1	26.2	25.8	9.0	2.9	5.2	0.8
Agnostic	30.9	25.7	27.7	5.8	4.3	4.9	0.7
Buddhist	43.2	24.7	25.0	1.1	2.8	3.3	0.0
Hindu	55.0	25.0	19.0	0.0	0.0	1.0	0.0
Jewish	42.6	43.7	10.2	0.0	1.3	1.7	0.6
Muslim/Islam	71.1	5.0	21.5	0.0	0.3	1.6	0.5
Sikh	72.6	6.6	15.0	0.0	0.0	5.7	0.0
Christian	32.1	40.4	11.9	8.4	1.9	4.4	1.0
Catholic	35.1	33.8	10.1	14.8	1.6	3.6	0.9
Mainline Protestant	28.2	49.4	13.6	0.5	2.3	4.9	1.1
Other Christian	32.4	35.4	18.0	0.9	2.6	9.6	1.2
Other Religion	25.7	34.6	17.9	4.1	3.3	12.4	2.0
Race
East Asian	48.9	26.3	20.3	0.2	1.9	2.3	0.1
Black	57.0	14.2	20.5	2.3	3.0	2.8	0.3
Indigenous	26.9	28.0	25.2	5.2	3.4	9.7	1.5
Latino	39.4	26.5	19.5	7.0	2.9	4.0	0.7
South Asian	60.6	13.6	22.9	0.0	0.5	2.5	0.0
Southeast Asian	44.8	23.9	28.4	0.0	1.3	1.6	0.0
West Asian	47.9	18.4	22.9	1.0	3.0	2.5	4.4
White	29.6	35.8	17.6	8.7	2.3	5.0	0.9
Other	26.6	28.3	19.5	4.2	3.8	13.8	3.8
Income
0-30,000	31.9	27.0	22.2	7.7	3.2	6.6	1.4
30,001-60,000	30.6	32.4	20.3	9.2	2.4	4.3	0.8
60,001-90,000	32.6	34.9	16.8	7.2	2.8	5.0	0.8
90,001-110,000	33.5	38.3	15.5	7.3	1.4	3.5	0.5
110,001-150,000	34.9	36.5	14.2	7.1	1.7	4.5	1.1
150,001-200,000	32.8	38.6	14.2	7.3	2.1	7.8	0.3
>200,000	40.1	36.9	10.8	4.3	1.6	4.9	1.3
Home Ownership
Own a residence	32.6	38.5	13.9	7.6	2.0	4.7	0.8
Don't own a residence	32.7	23.2	26.5	7.8	3.1	5.5	1.1
Do you live in...
A rural area or village	23.4	43.2	14.6	6.5	2.6	7.2	2.5
A town	25.6	37.6	15.6	10.9	2.9	6.2	1.2
A suburb	35.2	34.6	15.6	7.5	1.6	5.0	0.5
A city	37.0	29.3	20.7	6.2	2.4	3.7	0.6
Marital Status
Married	34.1	40.7	13.2	4.8	2.0	4.4	0.9
Not Married	31.4	27.6	21.9	10.2	2.7	5.4	0.9
Do you have children?
Yes	31.6	39.3	13.8	7.6	1.8	4.9	1.0
No	34.0	25.7	23.5	7.8	3.1	5.0	0.8
Employment
Full-time	34.1	31.1	17.6	8.4	2.5	5.0	1.2
Part-time	28.5	31.6	23.8	5.9	3.1	6.8	0.3
Self-employed	31.9	40.3	13.7	4.4	2.0	6.6	1.1
Retired	34.0	41.8	10.4	8.6	1.9	2.7	0.6
Unemployed	34.3	24.6	26.2	4.6	3.3	6.2	0.9
Student	27.9	16.6	40.0	7.0	3.5	4.6	0.5
Caregiver/Homemaker	26.7	37.5	21.5	1.1	1.5	10.4	1.4
Disabled	25.4	28.7	31.5	2.9	1.4	8.9	1.2
Do you belong to a union?
Yes	31.4	27.4	20.4	11.8	3.0	5.0	1.0
No	32.9	35.3	17.2	6.7	2.2	4.9	0.9

== Student Vote results ==
Student votes are mock elections, running parallel to actual elections, in which students not of voting age participate. Student vote elections are administered by Student Vote Canada, and are for educational purposes and do not count towards the results. Both Lanark—Frontenac—Kingston and Ville-Marie—Le Sud-Ouest—Île-des-Sœurs are tied, resulting in only 336 of 338 ridings being declared.

Map of the Student Vote results

Summary of the 2021 Canadian Student Vote
Party	Leader	Seats			Popular vote		
Party	Leader	Elected	%	Δ	Votes	%	Δ (pp)
Liberal	Justin Trudeau	117	34.91	▲8	188,342	24.04	▲1.70
New Democratic	Jagmeet Singh	107	31.36	▲6	223,041	28.47	▲3.63
Conservative	Erin O'Toole	88	26.03	▼4	196,495	25.08	▲0.01
Bloc Québécois	Yves-François Blanchet	21	6.21	▲9	16,120	2.06	▲0.67
Green	Annamie Paul	3	0.89	▼24	76,634	9.78	▼8.30
People's	Maxime Bernier	–	–	–	51,844	6.62	▲2.47
Other		–	–	–	30,867	3.94	▼0.18
Tie		2	0.59	–	—N/a		
Total		338	100.00	–	783,343	100.00	–
Source: Student Vote Canada

== See also ==
- List of Canadian federal general elections
- 2021 Canadian federal election in Alberta
- 2021 Canadian federal election in British Columbia
- 2021 Canadian federal election in Ontario
- 2021 Canadian federal election in Quebec
- 2021 Canadian federal election in Saskatchewan
- 2021 Canadian federal election in Newfoundland and Labrador
