= 2021 Canadian federal election in Quebec =

- September 20, 2021

All 78 Quebec seats in the House of Commons of Canada
- Opinion polls
- Registered: 6,495,755
- Turnout: 4,051,633 (62.37%)
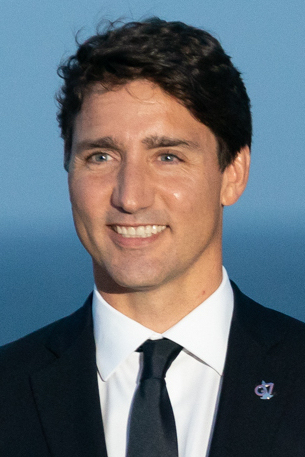

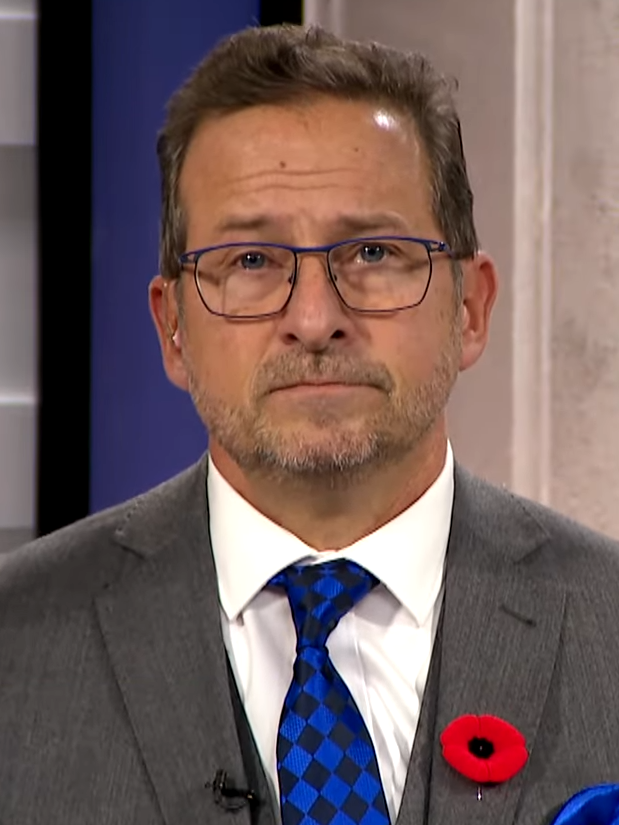

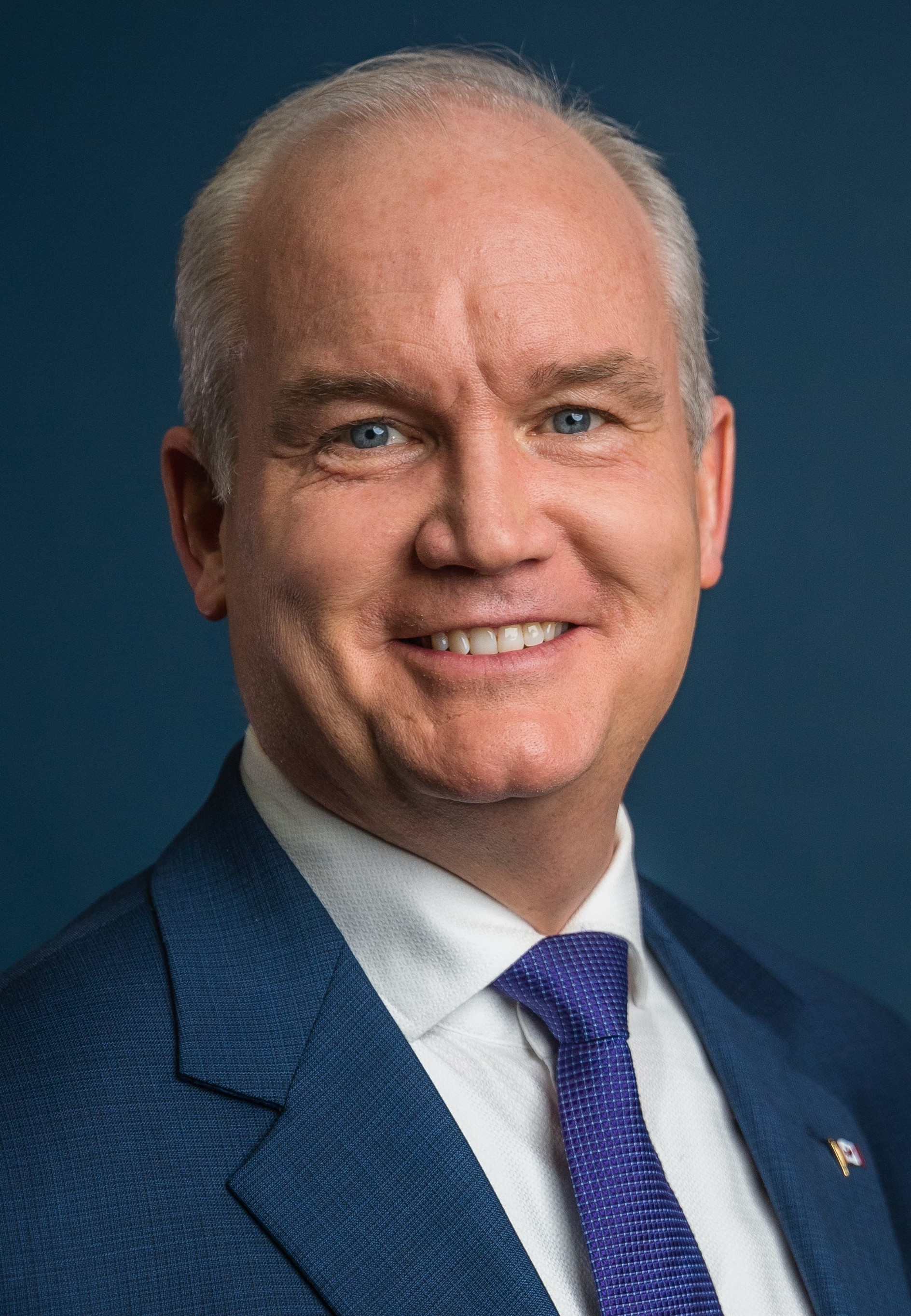

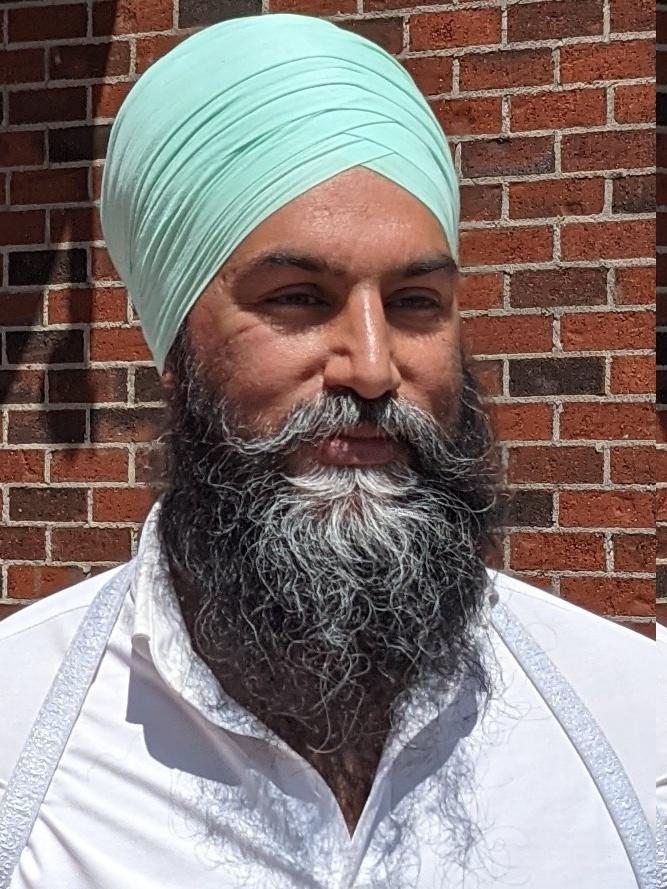
	First party	Second party
Leader	Justin Trudeau	Yves-François Blanchet
Party	Liberal	Bloc Québécois
Leader since	April 14, 2013	January 17, 2019
Last election	35 seats, 34.3%	32 seats, 32.4%
Seats before	35	32
Seats won	35	32
Seat change	0	0
Popular vote	1,364,485	1,301,615
Percentage	33.6%	32.1%
Swing	▼0.7 pp	▼0.3 pp
	Third party	Fourth party
Leader	Erin O'Toole	Jagmeet Singh
Party	Conservative	New Democratic
Leader since	August 24, 2020	October 1, 2017
Last election	10 seats, 16.0%	1 seats, 10.8%
Seats before	10	1
Seats won	10	1
Seat change	0	0
Popular vote	756,412	395,401
Percentage	18.6%	9.8%
Swing	▲2.6 pp	▼1.0 pp
Prime Minister before election
Justin Trudeau
Liberal
Prime Minister after election
Justin Trudeau
Liberal

In the 2021 Canadian federal election, there were 78 members of Parliament elected to the House of Commons from the province of Quebec, making up 23.1% of all members of the House.

== Background ==
=== Opinion polling ===
Opinion polling During the election campaign

== Predictions ==
Polling firm	Last date of polling	Link	LPC	CPC	NDP	BQ	GPC	PPC	Others	Margin of error (Note: In cases when linked poll details distinguish between the margin of error associated with the total sample of respondents (including undecided and non-voters) and that of the subsample of decided/leaning voters, the former is included in the table. Also not included is the margin of error created by rounding to the nearest whole number or any margin of error from methodological sources. Most online polls (because of their opt-in method of recruiting panelists which results in a non-random sample) cannot have a margin of error. In such cases, shown is what the margin of error would be for a survey using a random probability-based sample of equivalent size.)	Sample size (Note: Refers to the total, "raw" sample size, including undecided and non-voters, and before demographic weighting is applied. Fractions in parentheses apply to rolling polls (see below) and indicate the proportion of the sample that is independent from the previous poll in the series.)	Polling method (Note: "Telephone" refers to traditional telephone polls conducted by live interviewers; "IVR" refers to automated Interactive Voice Response polls conducted by telephone; "online" refers to polls conducted exclusively over the internet; "telephone/online" refers to polls which combine results from both telephone and online surveys, or for which respondents are initially recruited by telephone and then asked to complete an online survey. "Rolling" polls contain overlapping data from one poll to the next.)	Lead
Leger	September 1, 2021		33	20	13	28	3	2	1	±1.8 pp	3,102	online	5
Leger	December 13, 2020		33	21	11	30	4	—N/a	1	±3.1 pp	1,004	online	3
Leger	September 3, 2020		30	20	14	30	5	—N/a	1	±3.1 pp	1,000	online	0

== Campaign ==
The English-language debate gained notoriety when the moderator posed a question to Blanchet that suggested some in English speaking Canada may view Quebec's law on secularism as "discriminatory". He challenged her use of that word, and the response was seen as a turning point in the Bloc's campaign, which saw an upsurge in the polls after the debate. The Quebec National Assembly passed a motion calling for a formal apology for the question.

Premier of Quebec François Legault endorsed a Conservative government. He called the Liberal Party, the NDP and the Green Party dangerous.

Le Devoir endorsed the Bloc Québécois

== Results ==
=== Summary ===
No seats changed hands in Quebec during the 2021 Canadian federal election. The Conservatives, People's Party and Free Party, all made minor gains in their popular vote per cent. The Liberals, Bloc Quebecois, NDP, and Greens all experienced losses in their popular vote.

Quebec summary seat results in the 2021 Canadian federal election
Party	Votes	Vote %	Vote +/-	Seats	Seat +/-
Liberal	1,364,485	33.6%	▼0.7pp	35 / 78 (45%)	0
Bloc Québécois	1,301,615	32.1%	▼0.3pp	32 / 78 (41%)	0
Conservative	756,412	18.6%	▲2.6pp	10 / 78 (13%)	0
New Democratic	395,401	9.8%	▼1.0pp	1 / 78 (1%)	0
People's	108,744	2.7%	▲1.2pp	0 / 78 (0%)	0
Green	61,488	1.5%	▼3.0pp	0 / 78 (0%)	0
Free	44,214	1.1%	▲1.1pp	0 / 78 (0%)	0
Independent	8,476	0.2%	pp	0 / 78 (0%)	0
Other	12,406	0.3%	pp	0 / 78 (0%)	0
Total	4,053,241	100%	–	78 / 78 (100%)	0
Seat apportionment diagram:

=== Comparison with national results ===
Results by party
Party	Popular vote %			Seats in caucus
Party	QC	Natl. avg.	diff.	Seats in caucus
Liberal	33.6	32.6	+1.0	35 / 160 (22%)
Bloc Québécois	32.1	7.6	+24.5	32 / 32 (100%)
Conservative	18.6	33.7	-15.1	10 / 119 (8%)
New Democratic	9.8	17.8	-8.0	1 / 25 (4%)
Green	1.5	2.3	-0.8	0 / 2 (0%)
People's	2.7	4.9	-2.2	no caucus
Free	1.1	0.3	+0.8	no caucus
Total	–	–	–	78 / 338 (23%)

== Student vote results ==
Student votes are mock elections that run parallel to actual elections, in which students not of voting age participate. They are administered by Student Vote Canada. These are for educational purposes and do not count towards the results.

Summary of the 2021 Canadian Student Vote in Quebec
Party	Leader	Seats			Popular vote		
Party	Leader	Elected	%	Δ	Votes	%	Δ (pp)
Liberal	Justin Trudeau	40	51.28	▲6	26,465	31.19	▲3.54
Bloc Québécois	Yves-François Blanchet	21	26.92	▲9	16,200	19.09	▲4.25
Conservative	Erin O'Toole	9	11.54	▲1	11,116	13.10	▲2.92
New Democratic	Jagmeet Singh	7	8.97	▼15	18,083	21.31	▼2.92
Green	Annamie Paul	1	1.28	▼2	5,939	7.00	▼9.55
Other		0	0	0	4,512	5.32	▲1.61
People's	Maxime Bernier	0	0	0	2,543	3.00	▲0.16
Total		78	100.00	0	84,858	100.00	–
Source: Student Vote Canada
