= 2021 Canadian federal election in Alberta =

- September 20, 2021

All 34 Albertan seats in the House of Commons
- Registered: 3,033,419
- Turnout: 1,954,910 (64.4%)
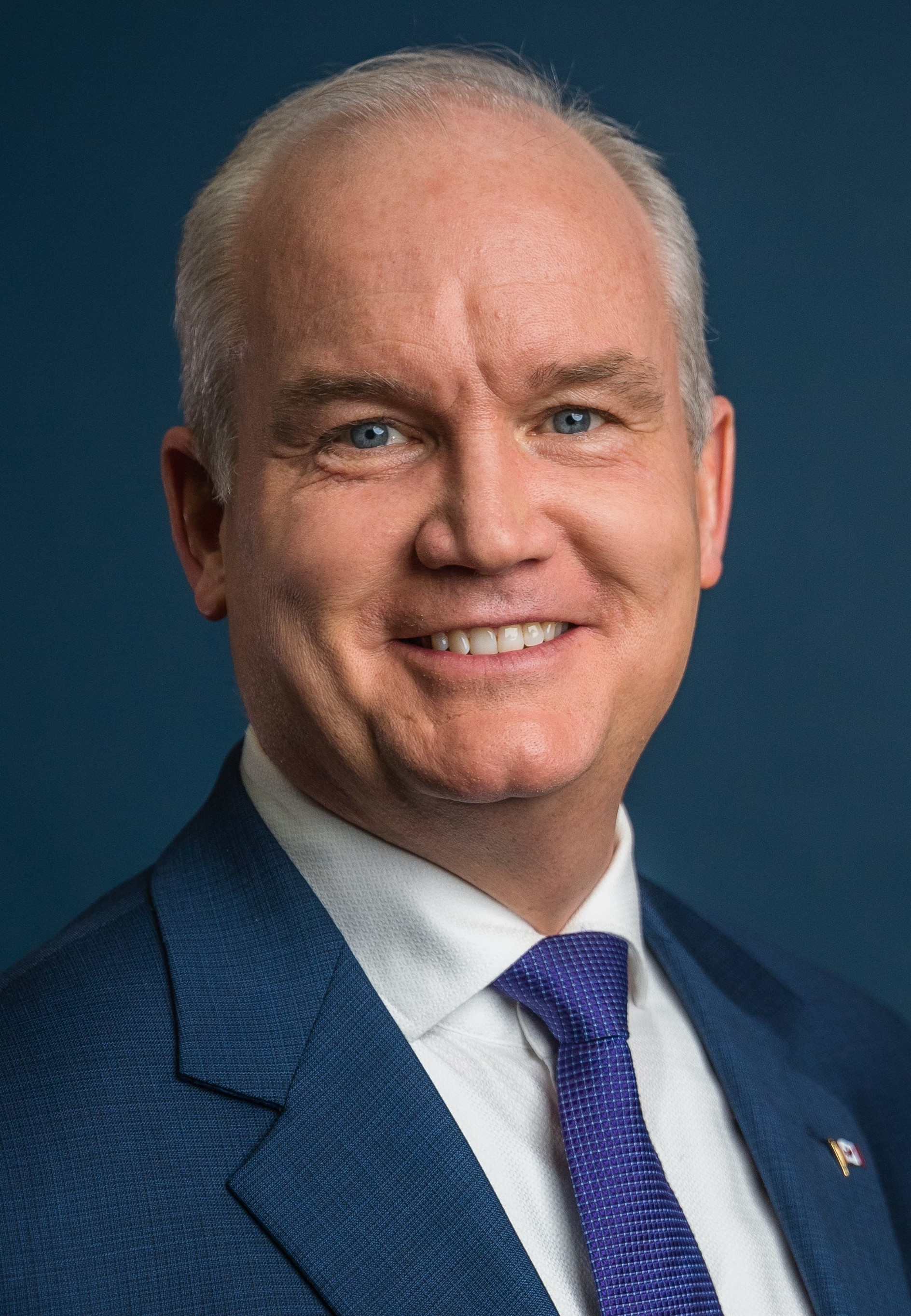

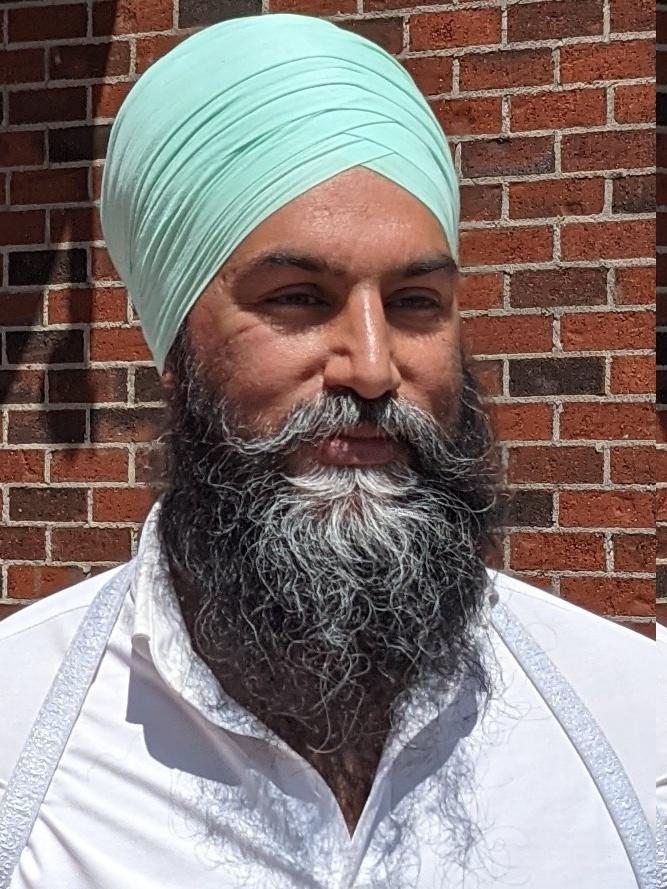

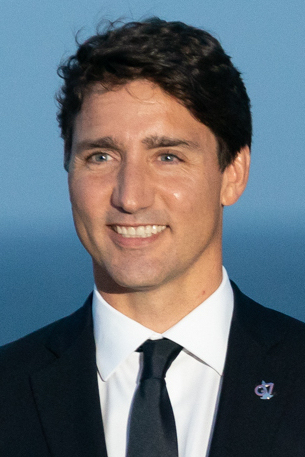

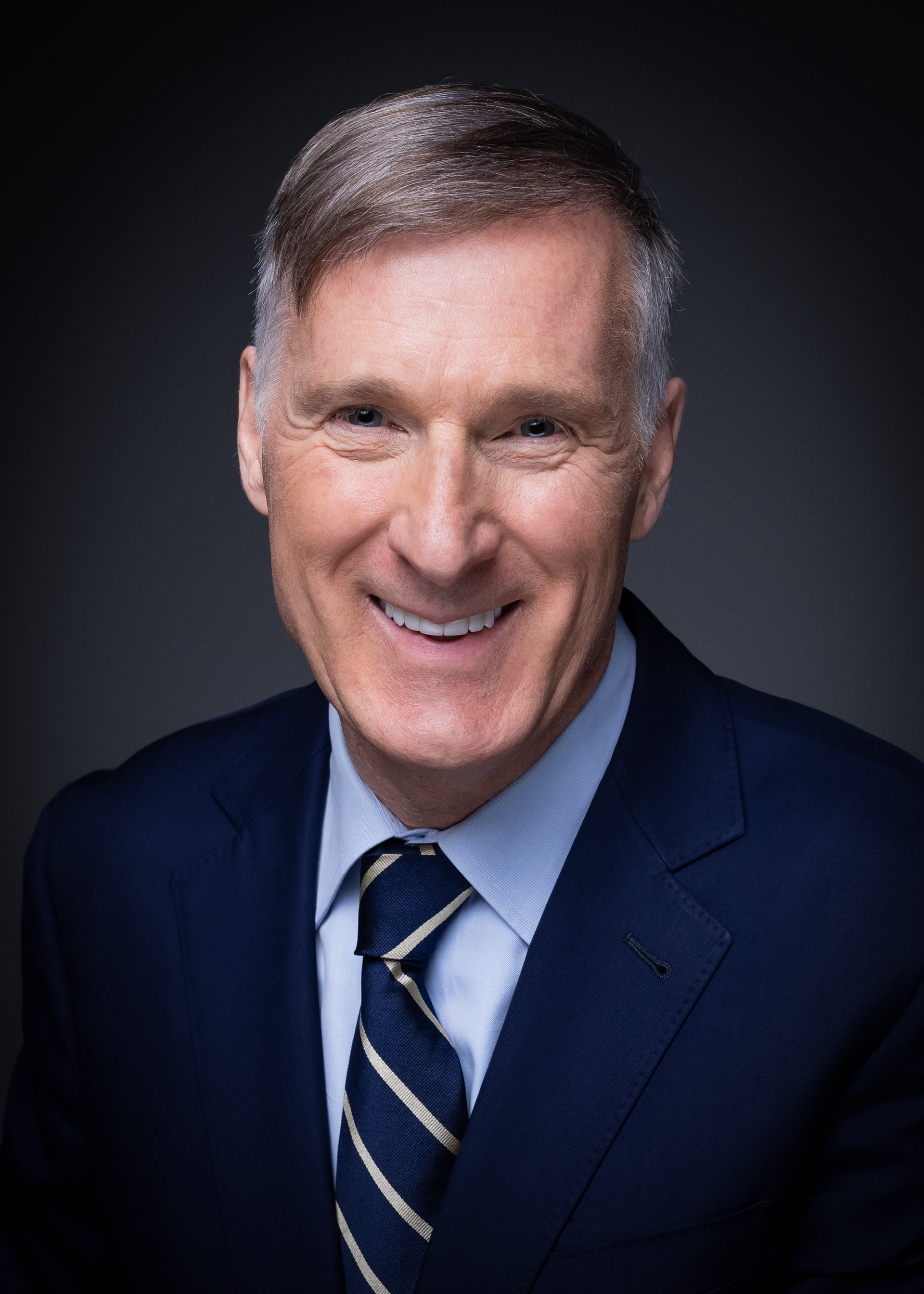
	First party	Second party
Leader	Erin O'Toole	Jagmeet Singh
Party	Conservative	New Democratic
Leader since	August 23, 2020	October 1, 2017
Last election	33 seats, 69.0%	1 seats, 11.6%
Seats before	33	1
Seats won	30	2
Seat change	▼3	▲1
Popular vote	1,075,638	370,394
Percentage	55.4%	19.1%
Swing	▼13.6%	▲7.5%
	Third party	Fourth party
Leader	Justin Trudeau	Maxime Bernier
Party	Liberal	People's
Leader since	April 14, 2013	September 14, 2018
Last election	0 seats, 13.8%	0 seats, 2.2%
Seats before	0	0
Seats won	2	0
Seat change	▲2	Steady
Popular vote	299,493	142,479
Percentage	15.4%	7.3%
Swing	▲1.6%	▲5.1%
Prime minister before election
Justin Trudeau
Liberal
Prime minister after election
Justin Trudeau
Liberal

In the 2021 Canadian federal election, 34 members of Parliament were elected to the House of Commons from the province of Alberta making up 10.1% of all members.

== Predictions ==
Polling firm	Last date of polling	Link	LPC	CPC	NDP	GPC	PPC	Others	Margin of error (Note: In cases when linked poll details distinguish between the margin of error associated with the total sample of respondents (including undecided and non-voters) and that of the subsample of decided/leaning voters, the former is included in the table. Also not included is the margin of error created by rounding to the nearest whole number or any margin of error from methodological sources. Most online polls (because of their opt-in method of recruiting panelists which results in a non-random sample) cannot have a margin of error. In such cases, shown is what the margin of error would be for a survey using a random probability-based sample of equivalent size.)	Sample size (Note: Refers to the total, "raw" sample size, including undecided and non-voters, and before demographic weighting is applied. Fractions in parentheses apply to rolling polls (see below) and indicate the proportion of the sample that is independent from the previous poll in the series.)	Polling method (Note: "Telephone" refers to traditional telephone polls conducted by live interviewers; "IVR" refers to automated Interactive Voice Response polls conducted by telephone; "online" refers to polls conducted exclusively over the internet; "telephone/online" refers to polls which combine results from both telephone and online surveys, or for which respondents are initially recruited by telephone and then asked to complete an online survey. "Rolling" polls contain overlapping data from one poll to the next.)	Lead
Janet Brown	April 10, 2021		24	53	17	2	2	0	±2.8 pp	1,200	Online/phone	29

== Results ==
=== Summary ===
The Conservative Party won a majority of seats and votes, taking 30 ridings, and winning 55.3% of the popular vote. The NDP came in a distant second, with 2 seats, receiving 19.1% of the popular vote. The Liberal Party made a slight recovery and received 15.4% of the popular vote, securing 2 seats.

The People's Party still won no seats, but saw their support surge to 7.4% of the vote.

The new western separatist Maverick Party received 1.3% of the vote, and no seats.

The Green party won no seats and their popular vote fell to just 0.9%.

The Centrist Party, the Christian Heritage Party, the Communist Party, the Libertarian Party, the Marxist-Leninist Party, the National Citizens Alliance, the Rhino Party, and the Veterans Coalition Party, all ran at least one candidate in Alberta in this election and got a combined 0.3% of the vote.

Albertan summary seat results in the 2021 Canadian federal election
Party	Votes	Vote %	Vote +/-	Seats	Seat +/-
Conservative	1,075,638	55.4%	▼13.6pp	30 / 34 (88%)	▼3
New Democratic	370,394	19.1%	▲7.5pp	2 / 34 (6%)	▲1
Liberal	299,493	15.4%	▲1.6pp	2 / 34 (6%)	▲2
People's	142,479	7.3%	▲5.1pp	0 / 34 (0%)	0
Maverick	25,670	1.3%	▲1.3pp	0 / 34 (0%)	0
Green	17,483	0.9%	▼1.9pp	0 / 34 (0%)	0
Independent	5,314	0.3%	▲ pp	0 / 34 (0%)	0
Other	6,618	0.3%	▲ pp	0 / 34 (0%)	0
Total	1,943,089	100%	–	34 / 34 (100%)	0

=== Comparison with national results ===
Results by party
Party	Popular vote %			Seats in caucus
Party	AB	Natl.	diff.	Seats in caucus
Conservative	55.4	33.7	+21.7	30 / 119 (25%)
New Democratic	19.1	17.8	+1.3	2 / 25 (8%)
Liberal	15.4	32.6	-17.2	2 / 160 (1%)
People's	7.3	4.9	+2.4	no caucus
Maverick	1.3	0.2	+1.1	no caucus
Green	0.9	2.3	-1.4	0 / 2 (0%)
Total	–	–	–	34 / 338 (10%)

== Student Vote results ==
Student votes are mock elections, running parallel to actual elections, in which students not of voting age participate. Student vote elections are administered by Student Vote Canada, and are for educational purposes and do not count towards the results.

Summary of the 2021 Canadian Student Vote in Alberta
Party	Leader	Seats			Popular vote		
Party	Leader	Elected	%	Δ	Votes	%	Δ (pp)
Conservative	Erin O'Toole	22	64.71	▼8	65,499	36.63	▼9.50
New Democratic	Jagmeet Singh	12	35.29	▲9	49,046	27.43	▲6.22
Liberal	Justin Trudeau	0	0	▼1	28,890	16.16	▲2.84
People's	Maxime Bernier	0	0	–	13,343	7.46	▲2.67
Green	Annamie Paul	0	0	–	11,194	6.26	▼4.55
Other		0	0	–	6,575	3.68	▲0.31
Maverick	Jay Hill (Interim)	0	0	–	4,258	2.38	▲2.38
Total		34	100.00	–	178,805	100.00	–
Source: Student Vote Canada

== See also ==
- Canadian federal election results in Calgary
- Canadian federal election results in Edmonton and environs
- Canadian federal election results in rural Alberta
- 2026 Alberta independence referendum
- 2023 Alberta general election
