= 2021 Canadian federal election in Ontario =

- September 20, 2021

All 121 Ontario seats in the House of Commons
- Registered: 10,492,441
- Turnout: 6,505,569 (62.0)
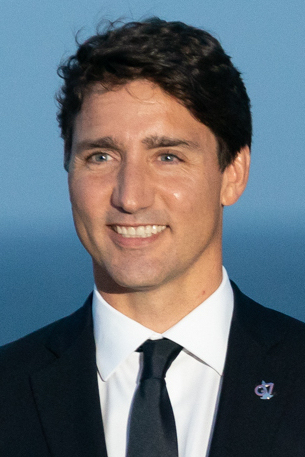

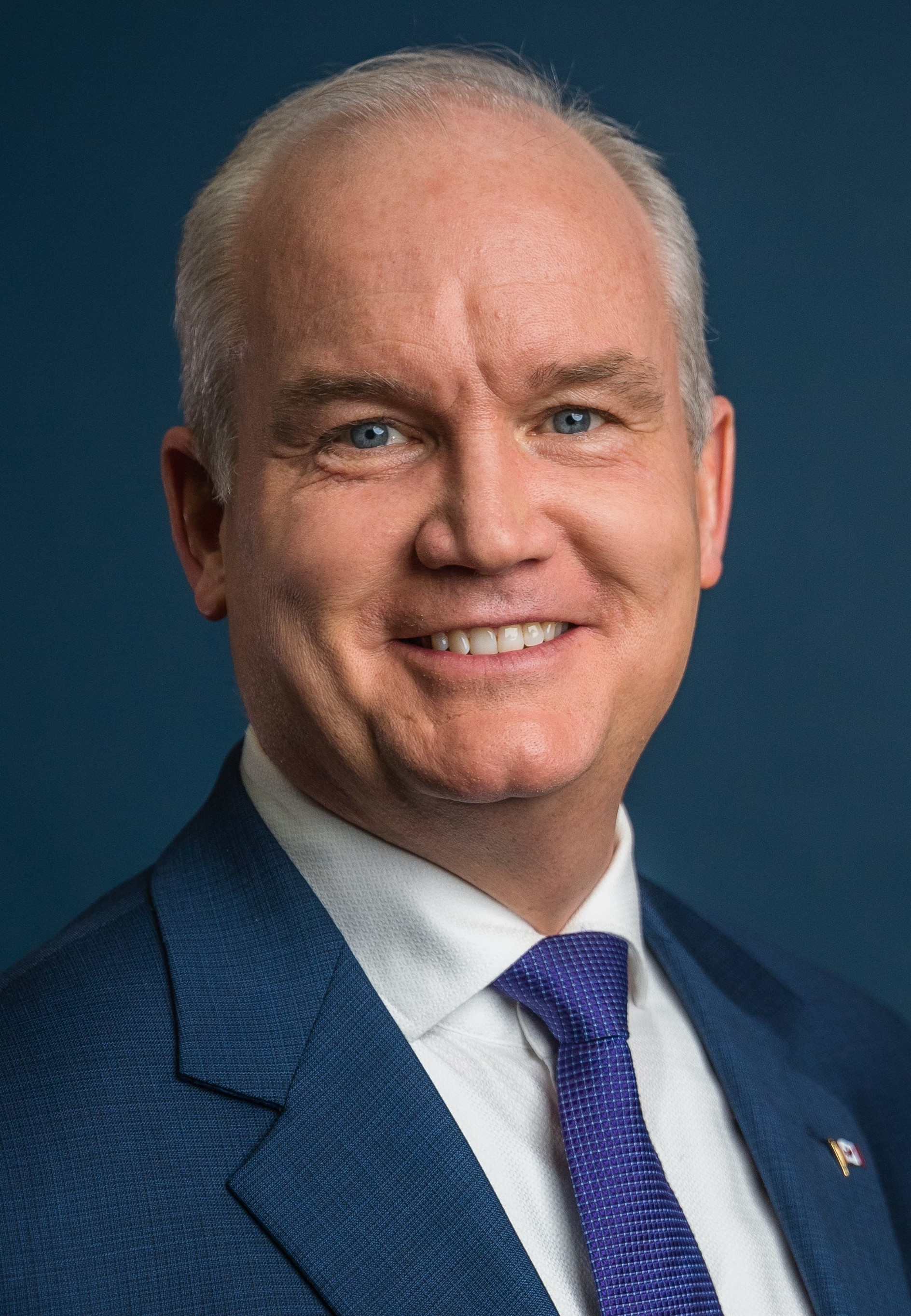

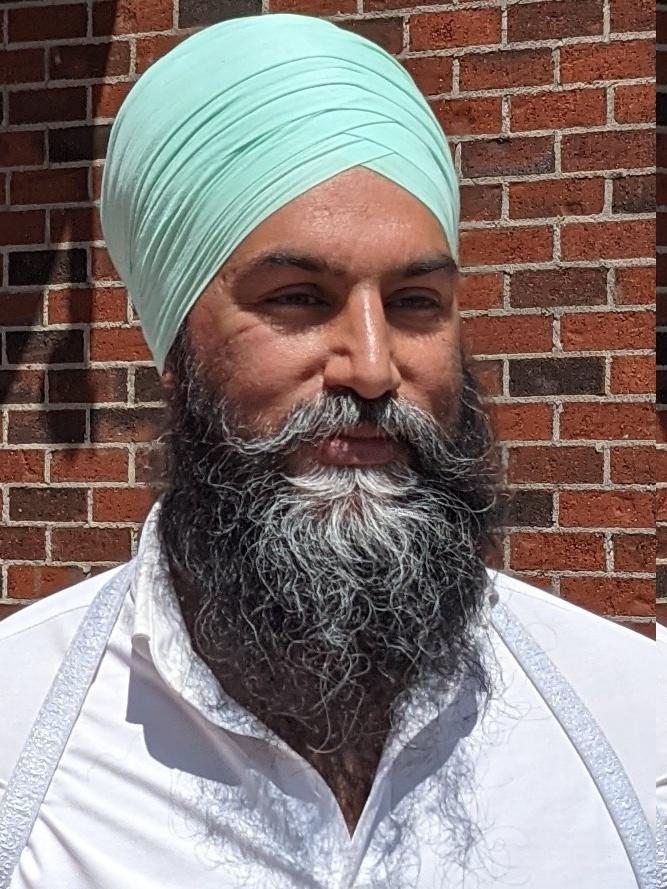

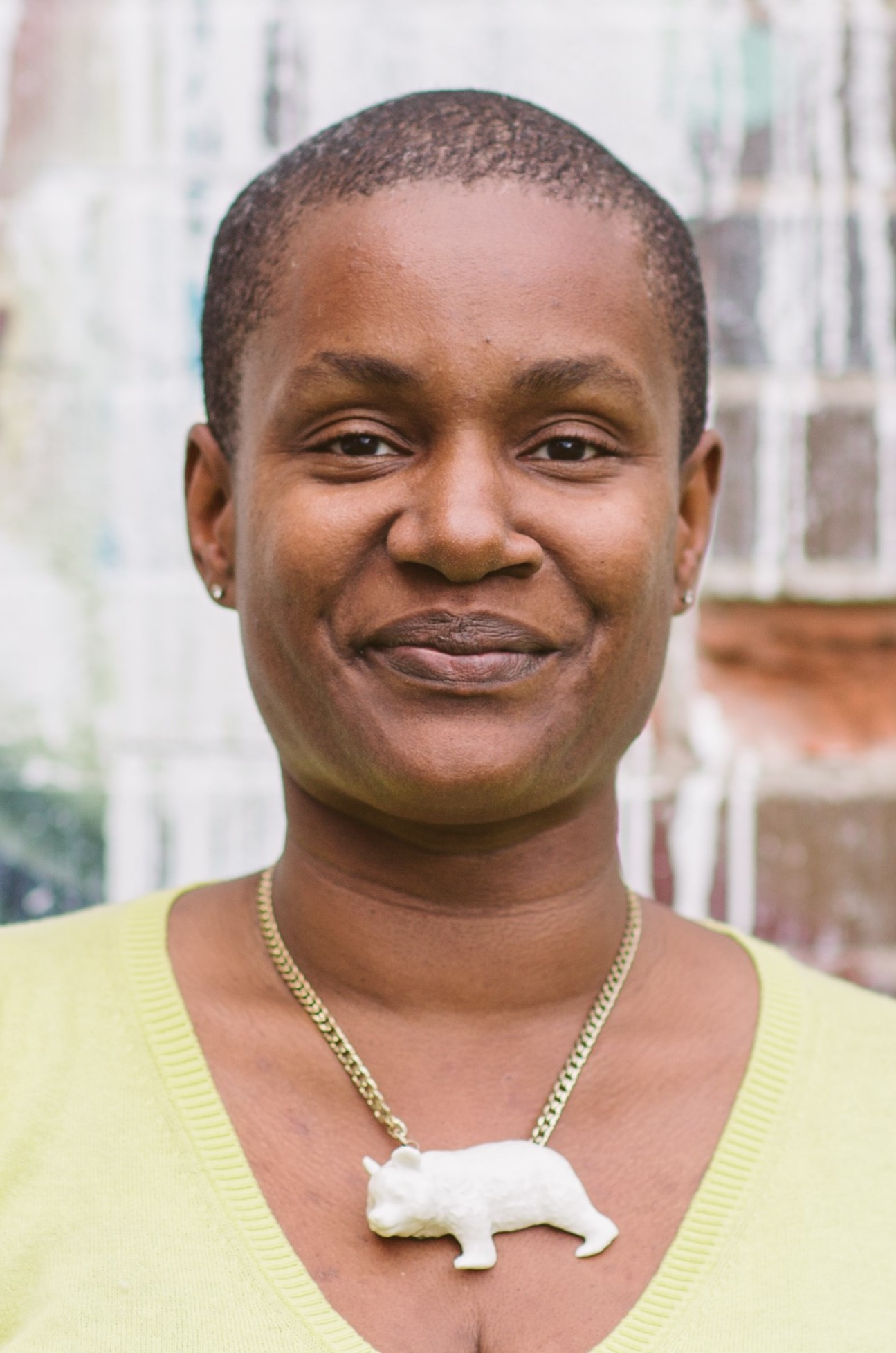

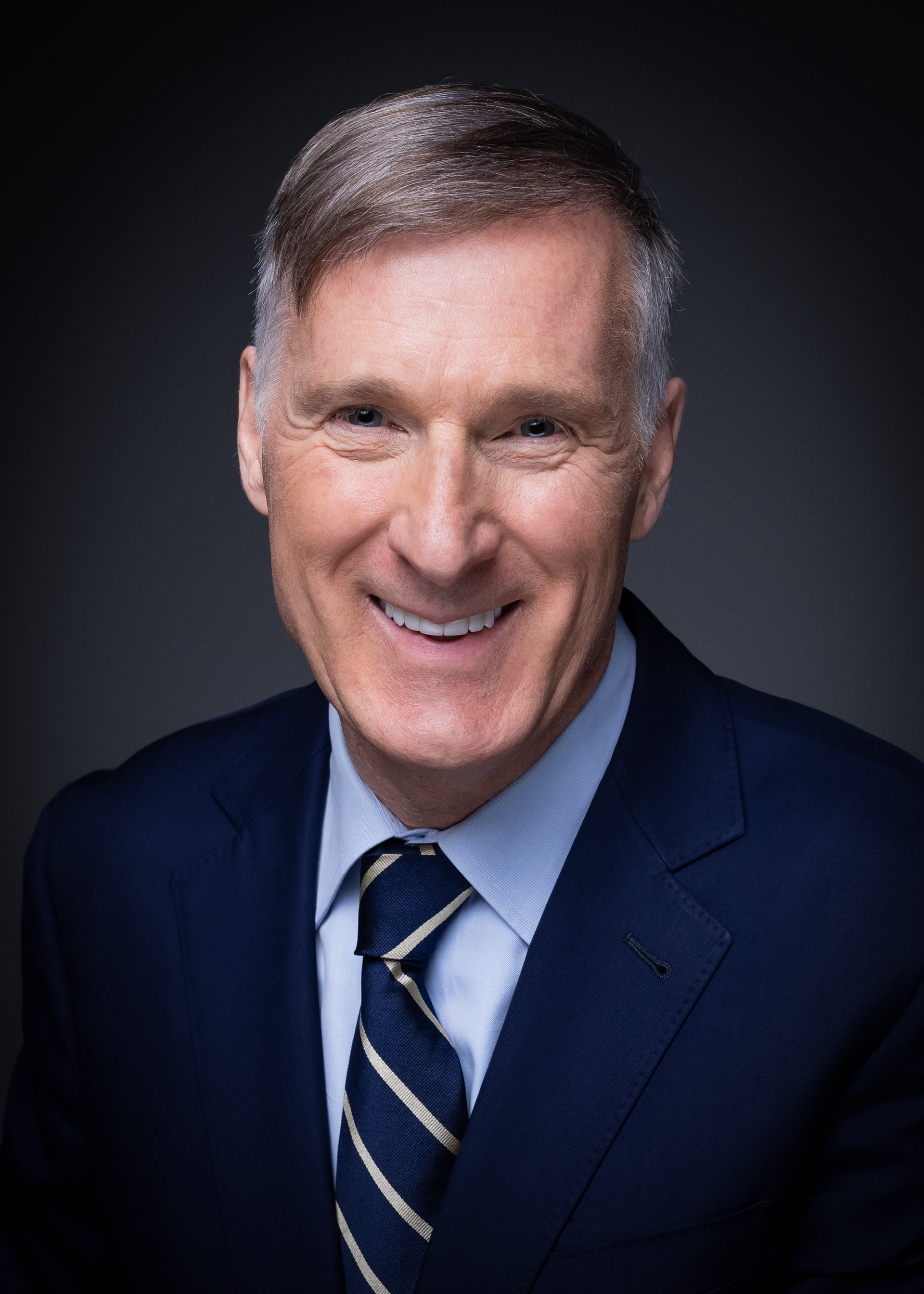
	First party	Second party	Third party
Leader	Justin Trudeau	Erin O'Toole	Jagmeet Singh
Party	Liberal	Conservative	New Democratic
Leader since	April 14, 2013	August 24, 2020	October 1, 2017
Last election	79 seats, 41.5%	36 seats, 33.2%	6 seats, 16.6%
Seats before	76	35	6
Seats won	78	37	5
Seat change	▲2	▲2	▼1
Popular vote	2,535,222	2,251,826	1,153,119
Percentage	39.3	34.9	17.8
Swing	▼2.2pp	▲1.7pp	▲1.2pp
	Fourth party	Fifth party
Leader	Annamie Paul	Maxime Bernier
Party	Green	People's
Leader since	October 3, 2020	September 14, 2018
Last election	0 seats, 6.2%	0 seats, 1.6%
Seats before	0	0
Seats won	1	0
Seat change	▲1	0
Popular vote	142,678	350,150
Percentage	2.2	5.5
Swing	▼4.0pp	▲3.9pp
Prime Minister before election
Justin Trudeau
Liberal
Elected Prime Minister
Justin Trudeau
Liberal

In the 2021 Canadian federal election, 121 members of parliament were elected to the House of Commons from the province of Ontario (35.8% of all members).

== Timeline ==
Seat	Before				Change		
Seat	Date	Member	Party	Reason	Date	Member	Party
Kitchener South—Hespeler	June 6, 2020	Marwan Tabbara	█ Liberal	Resigned from caucus (Note: Laying of assault charges unrelated to parliament)			█ Independent
Toronto Centre	August 17, 2020	Bill Morneau	█ Liberal	Resigned (Note: To pursue leadership of OECD)	October 26, 2020	Marci Ien	█ Liberal
York Centre	September 1, 2020	Michael Levitt	█ Liberal	Resigned (Note: To become a non-profit executive)	October 26, 2020	Ya'ara Saks	█ Liberal
Don Valley East	November 9, 2020	Yasmin Ratansi	█ Liberal	Resigned from caucus (Note: Revelation of nepotism in staff hiring)			█ Independent
Hastings—Lennox and Addington	January 20, 2021	Derek Sloan	█ Conservative	Expelled from caucus (Note: Accepted a political donation from white supremacist Paul Fromm)			█ Independent
Brampton Centre	January 25, 2021	Ramesh Sangha	█ Liberal	Expelled from caucus (Note: Made unsupported allegations that multiple other Liberal MPs harboured support for the Khalistan movement)			█ Independent
Haldimand—Norfolk	May 11, 2021	Diane Finley	█ Conservative	Resigned			█ Vacant

== Results ==
=== Summary ===
Party	Votes	Vote %	Vote +/-	Seats	Seat +/-
Liberal	2,535,222	39.3%	▼2.2pp	78 / 121 (64%)	▲2
Conservative	2,251,826	34.9%	▲1.7pp	37 / 121 (31%)	▲2
New Democratic	1,153,119	17.8%	▲1.2pp	5 / 121 (4%)	▼1
Green	142,678	2.2%	▼4.0pp	1 / 121 (0.8%)	▲1
People's	350,150	5.5%	▲3.9pp	0 / 121 (0%)	0
Independents and minor parties	21,563	0.3%	▼0.4pp	0 / 121 (0%)	▼3
Total	6,454,558	100%	–	121 / 121 (100%)	▲1 (Note: 1 seat was vacant at the dissolution of Parliament.)

=== Comparison with national results ===
Results by party
Party	Popular vote %			Seats in caucus
Party	ON	Natl. avg.	diff.	Seats in caucus
Liberal	39.3	32.62	+6.68	78 / 160 (49%)
Conservative	34.9	33.74	+1.16	37 / 119 (31%)
New Democratic	17.8	17.82	-0.02	5 / 25 (20%)
Green	2.2	2.33	-0.13	1 / 2 (50%)
People's	5.5	4.94	+0.56	no caucus

== Student vote results ==
Student votes are mock elections that run parallel to actual elections, in which students not of voting age participate. They are administered by Student Vote Canada. These are for educational purposes and do not count towards the results.

Summary of the 2021 Canadian Student Vote in Ontario
Party	Leader	Seats			Popular vote		
Party	Leader	Elected	%	Δ	Votes	%	Δ (pp)
Liberal	Justin Trudeau	53	43.80	▼2	73,560	29.23	▲0.86
New Democratic	Jagmeet Singh	36	29.75	0	70,144	27.87	▲3.01
Conservative	Erin O'Toole	31	25.62	▲4	57,315	22.77	▲2.54
Green	Annamie Paul	1	0.83	▼4	25,425	10.10	▼7.83
People's	Maxime Bernier	0	0	0	17,637	7.01	▲2.68
Other		0	0	0	7,579	3.01	▼1.67
Total		121	100.00	0	251,660	100.00	–
Source: Student Vote Canada

== See also ==
- 2022 Ontario general election
