= Leaders' Debates Commission =

Independent Canadian government agency

- Commission des débats des chefs

Agency overview
- Formed: 2018
- Jurisdiction: Federal election debates
- Agency executive: Vacant, Debates Commissioner
- Parent agency: Privy Council Office
- Website: debates-debats.ca

The Leaders' Debates Commission is the independent Canadian government agency which is charged with organizing leaders' debates during federal elections in Canada. In 2018, the commission was established to organize two debates, one in English and one in French, between the leaders of eligible political parties during the 2019 Canadian federal election. Following the 2019 election, the Commission released a report to Parliament containing recommendations for future election debates, including that itself be charged with organizing future debates and tasked with determining the criteria for a leader to be invited to debates.

== Background ==
Prior to the creation of the commission, Canadian leaders' debates were organized and held by a consortium of the main television networks. In 2015, Stephen Harper, then leader of the Conservative Party, said he would not participate in debates organized by the consortium and instead participate in a series of independently organized debates. While he later agreed to participate in a French language debate hosted by the consortium, no English language debate was hosted by the consortium due to the resulting uncertainty. Other independently hosted debates occurred during the 2015 election campaign, but reached much smaller audiences than previous consortium debates.

== Mandate ==
The commission is tasked with holding two official debates during the 2019 federal election. Following the election, it is also required to provide a report to Parliament on the leaders' debates and make recommendations for how future leaders debates should be conducted.

== Composition ==
The position of Debates’ Commissioner is currently vacant. Former Governor General David Johnston served as the Commissioner until he resigned in March 2023 to become the Special Rapporteur for Election Interference. Journalist Michel Cormier serves as the commissions' executive director.

The body also has a seven person advisory board. The current members are former Members of Parliament John Manley, Megan Leslie, and Deborah Grey, history professor Chad Gaffield, DMZ Executive Director Abdullah Snobar, judge Louise Otis and Aboriginal Peoples Television Network CEO Jean LaRose. The first meeting of the advisory board took place on March 26, 2019.

== 2019 debates ==
The English language debate took place on October 7 and the French on October 10. Both debates took place at the Canadian Museum of History in Gatineau, Quebec.

=== Production ===
Following the Commission's request for proposal, the Canadian Debate Production Partnership was selected to produce the debates. The CDPP consisted of a consortium of English- and French-language broadcasters and newspapers: CBC News/Radio-Canada, Global News, CTV News, the Toronto Star, HuffPost Canada/Quebec, La Presse, Le Devoir, and L'Actualité.

The English debate was moderated by Rosemary Barton (CBC News), Susan Delacourt (Toronto Star), Dawna Friesen (Global News), Lisa LaFlamme (CTV News) and Althia Raj (HuffPost Canada), each responsible for a portion of the debate. The French moderator was Patrice Roy (Ici Radio-Canada Télé), who was assisted by several journalists from prominent Quebec newspapers.

=== Leaders invited ===
The government established rules in 2018 to determine which party leaders are invited to the official debates. To be invited a party must satisfy two of the following:

1. Have at least one member elected under the party's banner;
2. Nominate candidates to run in at least 90% of all ridings; and
3. Have captured at least 4% of the votes in the previous election or be considered by the commissioner to have a legitimate chance to win seats in the current election, based on public opinion polls.

In November 2018, Minister of Democratic Institutions Karina Gould said that Maxime Bernier would qualify for the debates as leader of the People's Party of Canada if the party nominated candidates in 90% of ridings.

On August 12, 2019, the Commissioner extended invitations for Justin Trudeau, Andrew Scheer, Jagmeet Singh, Elizabeth May and Yves-François Blanchet to attend. He also sent a letter to Maxime Bernier indicating that he did not qualify for the debates at this time, and asking for additional information from the People's Party so that a final decision could be reached by September 16. Bernier criticized the decision saying that it would not be a "real debate" without him. On September 16, following submission of further information from the People's Party, the Commissioner determined that "more than one candidate endorsed by the party has a reasonable chance to be elected" and therefore Bernier would be invited to the debates.

=== Content of debates ===
English debate:

1. Affordability and economic insecurity
2. National and global leadership
3. Indigenous issues
4. Polarization human rights, and immigration
5. Environment and energy

French debate:

1. The economy and finances
2. Environment and energy
3. Foreign policy and immigration
4. Ethics and governance
5. Service to citizens

On July 17, protesters gathered in cities across Canada calling for a leaders' debate to be held on the topic of climate change. The protests were directed at CBC News after organizers were told that broadcasters not the commission would determine the questions and topics of the debates. In response to the protests, the CBC released a statement saying that the commission and the editorial group at the broadcaster ultimately selected to host the debates would be responsible for making such determinations. On August 8, 2019, organizers delivered a petition with 48,000 signatures to the CBC.

== 2020 report ==
In June 2020, the Commission released its report reviewing the 2019 election debates and making recommendations for future debates. The report recommended a permanent and publicly funded commission be tasked with organizing two debates every election. It also called for the head of the commission to be selected through consultation with all political parties, and for the commission, not the government to set the criteria for participation in future election debates.

== 2021 debates ==
The English language debate in 2021 was criticized by former NDP strategist Robin Sears for its format. Sears alleged that participants were not given enough time to respond to each question and that reporters became stars of the debates rather than facilitating debate among the leaders. The debate started off with a question from moderator Sachi Kurl of Angus Reid posed to Yves-François Blanchet which was called offensive for appearing to label Quebecers as racist. This led to calls by political commentators for the Leaders' Debates Commission to be reformed and allow effective debate among the leaders.

== 2022 report ==
In its May 2022 report, the commission recommended various improvements for future debates, and that it remain a permanent publicly funded entity to organize leaders' debates.

== 2025 debates ==
On April 1, 2025, the Commission announced that it had invited the leaders of the Bloc Québécois, Conservative Party, Green Party, Liberal Party, and New Democratic Party to the 2025 debates. Invitations were issued on the basis of meeting at least two of three conditions: having at least one sitting MP, recording at least 4% support in national opinion polling, and endorsing candidates in at least 90 percent of ridings. The Green Party's invitation was rescinded on April 16 as it ultimately ran candidates in 232 ridings (less than 70 percent) despite earlier submitting to the Commission that it would run candidates in every riding. The People's Party was not invited, as it did not meet the criteria for either holding a seat in Parliament or polling at least 4%.

On April 15, the leaders of the Bloc Québécois and the NDP suggested rescheduling the French language debate because of the debate coinciding with the final hockey game of the Montreal Canadiens' regular season, after it became clear the game would decide whether the Canadiens would make the playoffs. The Commission declined to reschedule the debate to a different day, but agreed to move the start time two hours earlier to 6:00 pm EDT.

A post-debate news scrum occurred after the French language debate, with independent and local journalists invited to question candidates, along with mass news media. Later, David Cochrane of CBC News asked Michel Cormier, the debate commission’s executive director, about the fairness of the distribution of questions among outlets and the type of questions asked. Cormier stated, "There's only so much we can do to control free speech." The question period following the English Federal Leaders' Debate in Montreal on Thursday April 17, 2025, was cancelled by the commission following a disturbance in the media centre by Rebel News-affiliated propagandists.
