= 2021 Canadian federal election in Saskatchewan =

- September 20, 2021

All 14 Saskatchewanian seats in the House of Commons
- Registered: 808,175
- Turnout: 518,913 (64.2%)
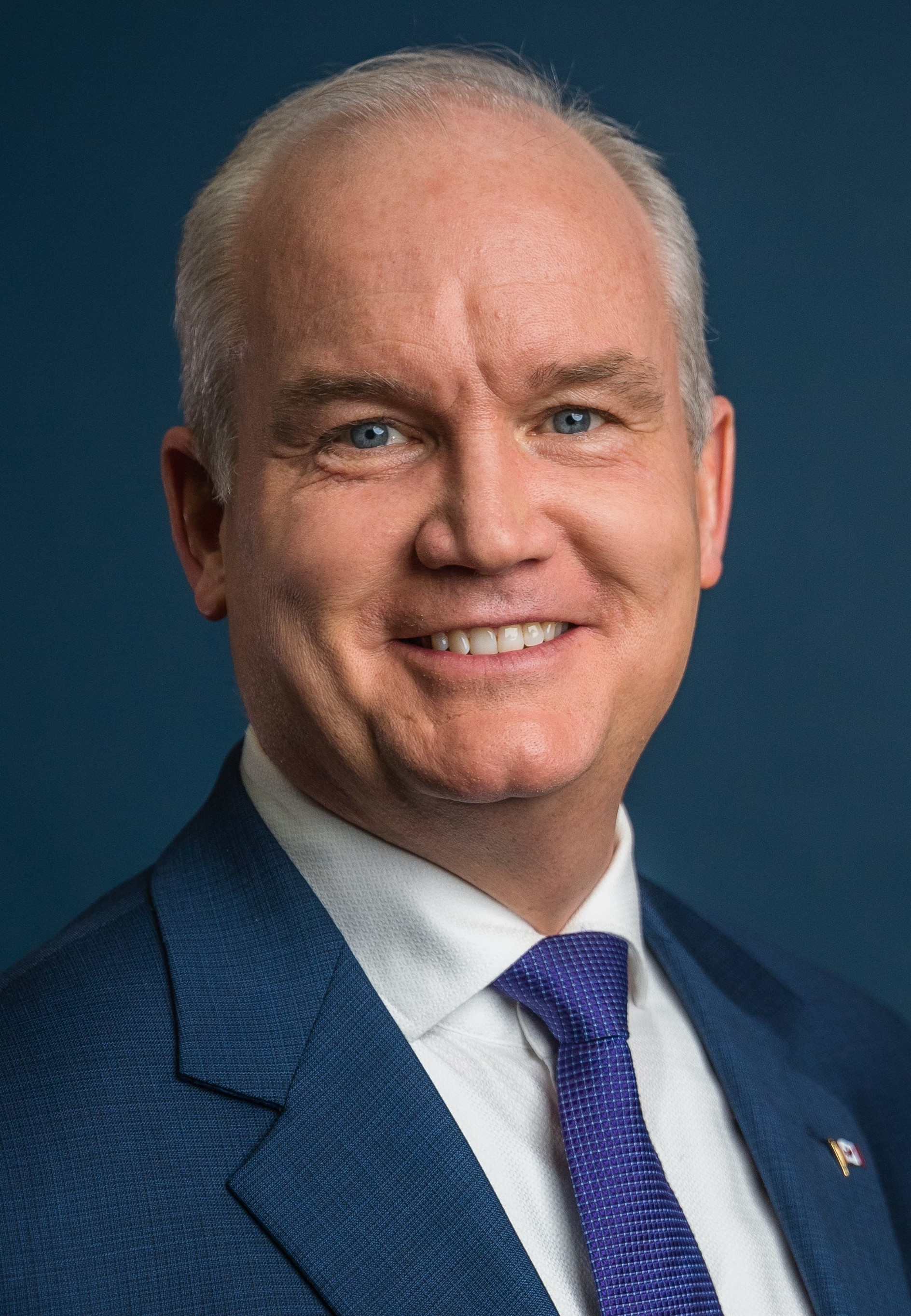

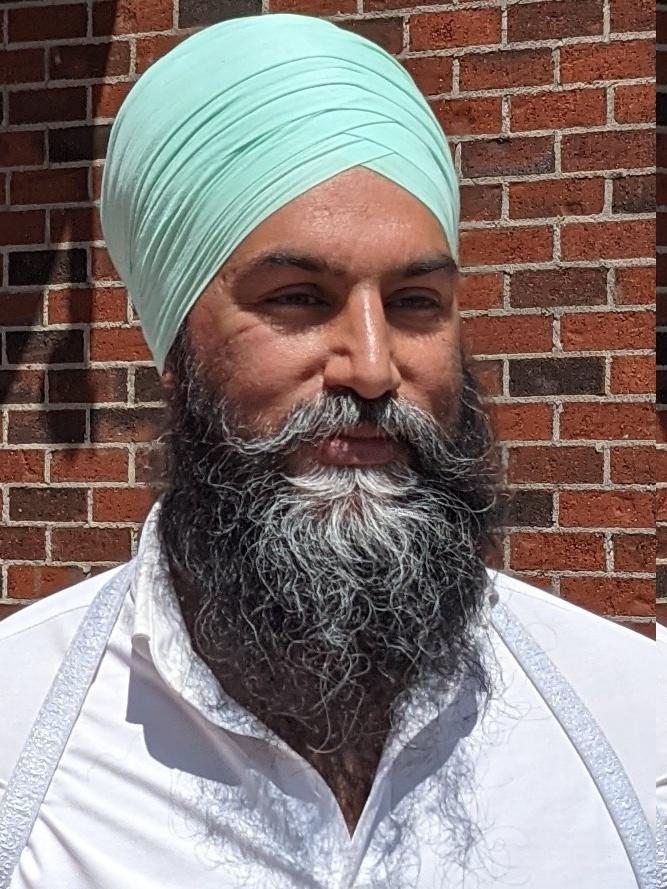

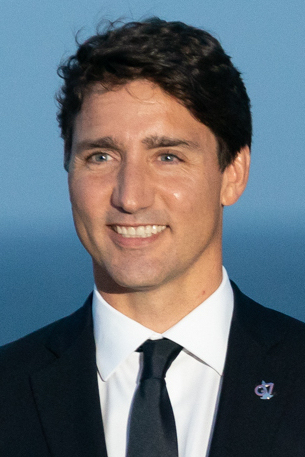

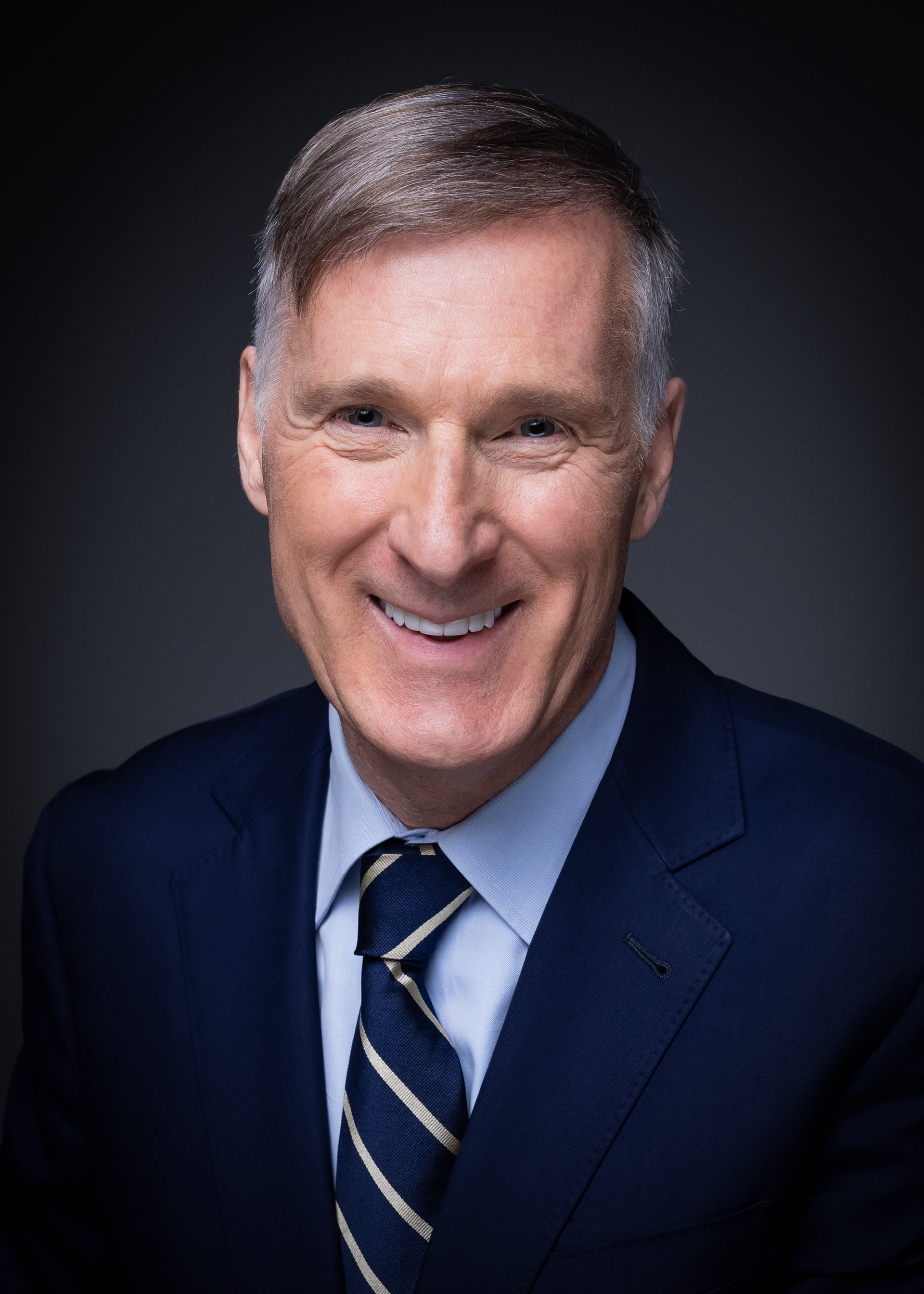
	First party	Second party
Leader	Erin O'Toole	Jagmeet Singh
Party	Conservative	New Democratic
Leader since	August 23, 2020	October 1, 2017
Last election	14 seats, 64.0%	0 seats, 19.6%
Seats before	14	0
Seats won	14	0
Seat change	0	0
Popular vote	304,698	108,720
Percentage	59.0%	21.1%
Swing	▼5.0%	▲1.5%
	Third party	Fourth party
Leader	Justin Trudeau	Maxime Bernier
Party	Liberal	People's
Leader since	April 14, 2013	September 14, 2018
Last election	0 seats, 11.7%	0 seats, 1.8%
Seats before	0	0
Seats won	0	0
Seat change	0	Steady
Popular vote	54,731	33,969
Percentage	10.6%	6.6%
Swing	▼1.1%	▲4.8%
Prime minister before election
Justin Trudeau
Liberal
Prime minister after election
Justin Trudeau
Liberal

In the 2021 Canadian federal election, 14 members of Parliament were elected to the House of Commons from the province of Saskatchewan making up 4.14% of all members.

== Results ==
=== Summary ===
The Conservative Party won a majority of seats and votes, taking all 14 ridings, and winning 59% of the popular vote. The NDP came in a distant second, receiving 21.1% of the popular vote. The Liberal Party dropped further and received 10.6% of the popular vote.

The People's Party still won no seats, but saw their support surge to 6.6% of the vote.

The new western separatist Maverick Party received 1.4% of the vote, and no seats.

The Green party won no seats and their popular vote fell to just 1.1%.

The Christian Heritage Party, and the Communist Party also ran candidates in Saskatchewan in this election.

Saskatchewanian summary seat results in the 2021 Canadian federal election
Party	Votes	Vote %	Vote +/-	Seats	Seat +/-
Conservative	304,698	59.0%	▼5.0pp	14 / 14 (100%)	0
New Democratic	108,720	21.1%	▲1.5pp	0 / 14 (0%)	0
Liberal	54,731	10.6%	▼1.1pp	0 / 14 (0%)	0
People's	33,969	6.6%	▲4.8pp	0 / 14 (0%)	0
Maverick	7,279	1.4%	▲1.4pp	0 / 14 (0%)	0
Green	5,699	1.1%	▼1.5pp	0 / 14 (0%)	0
Independents and minor parties	728	0.1%	▼0.1pp	0 / 14 (0%)	0
Total	515,824	100%	–	14 / 14 (100%)	0

=== Comparison with national results ===
Results by party
Party	Popular vote %			Seats in caucus
Party	SK	Natl.	diff.	Seats in caucus
Conservative	59.0	33.7	+25.3	14 / 119 (12%)
New Democratic	21.1	17.8	+3.3	0 / 25 (0%)
Liberal	10.6	32.6	-20.0	0 / 160 (0%)
People's	6.6	4.9	+1.7	no caucus
Maverick	1.4	0.2	+1.2	no caucus
Green	1.1	2.3	-1.2	0 / 2 (0%)
Total	–	–	–	14 / 338 (4%)

== Student Vote results ==
Student votes are mock elections, running parallel to actual elections, in which students not of voting age participate. Student vote elections are administered by Student Vote Canada, and are for educational purposes and do not count towards the results.

Summary of the 2021 Canadian Student Vote in Saskatchewan
Party	Leader	Seats			Popular vote		
Party	Leader	Elected	%	Δ	Votes	%	Δ (pp)
Conservative	Erin O'Toole	10	71.43	▼1	12,225	38.74	▼7.50
New Democratic	Jagmeet Singh	4	28.57	▲1	9,176	29.08	▲4.96
Liberal	Justin Trudeau	0	0	0	3,806	12.06	▲2.84
Green	Annamie Paul	0	0	–	3,168	10.04	▼1.37
People's	Maxime Bernier	0	0	–	2,349	7.44	▲2.10
Maverick	Jay Hill (Interim)	0	0	–	596	1.89	▲1.89
Other		0	0	–	234	0.74	▼0.97
Total		14	100.00	–	31,554	100.00	–
Source: Student Vote Canada

== See also ==
- 2020 Saskatchewan general election
