= Patrice Roy =

Canadian journalist

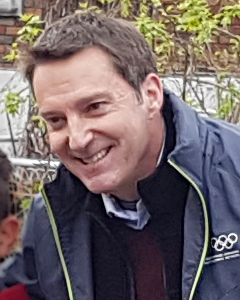
- Patrice Roy in May 2017
- Born: February 25, 1963 (age 63); Quebec
- Education: Université de Montréal
- Employer(s): Radio-Canada; Canadian Broadcasting Corporation
- Known for: Journalism

Patrice Roy (born February 25, 1963) is a Canadian news presenter. Since 2008, he has hosted Le Téléjournal Grand Montréal 6 p.m on Télévision de Radio-Canada.

== Biography ==
=== Early life ===
Patrice Roy, son of journalist Michel Roy, grew up in the Côte-des-Neiges borough of Montreal. At the age of 6, he had to have hip surgery due to a condition that made the femur very soft. He attended Collège Jean-de-Brébeuf, then the University of Montreal.

=== Career ===
After starting out in 1985 at CISM, the student radio station at the University of Montreal, he was a researcher for the production company Pixcom on the international news program Table Rase, broadcast on Radio-Québec.

He first appeared on Radio-Canada Television in 1989 as a public affairs reporter for Enjeux. He then joined the newsroom in Montreal, where he covered, among other things, the municipal world. He was a parliamentary correspondent in Quebec City from 1997, then in Ottawa from 2000. He was the bureau chief for Parliament Hill in Canada between 2005 and 2008. He co-authored with Michel Cormier, War Rooms, a documentary on the behind-the-scenes work of the strategic decision-making centers of the Liberal Party and the Parti Québécois.

He survived a Taliban attack on August 22, 2007 while he was with the Canadian Armed Forces as a correspondent for Radio-Canada. Two Canadian soldiers were killed in the attack.

Since the end of summer 2008, he has hosted Le Téléjournal Grand Montréal 6 p.m, the local television news programme on Télévision de Radio-Canada in the Greater Montreal region.

Roy was in Paris on November 13, 2015 and hosted a special program devoted to the attacks from the French capital, for a two-hour special program on ICI RDI.

Furthermore, he currently presents two hours of news on public service channels: En Direct avec Patrice Roy on ICI RDI at 5p.m. Eastern Time, since 2014, and still the Le Téléjournal Grand Montréal 6 p.m on Ici Radio-Canada Télé.

On April 16, 2025, Patrice Roy moderated the French language leaders debate for the 2025 Canadian federal election.

== Personal life ==
He is the father of videographer Émile Roy, born in 1999.

== Distinctions ==
- 1992 - Gemini Award for Best Reporting Team, Les enfants de la rue
- Mireille-Lanctôt Prize, documentary on religion in the USSR
- 2004 - Collège Jean-de-Brébeuf Young Talent Award
