= Michel Cormier (journalist) =

Canadian journalist, lecturer and author

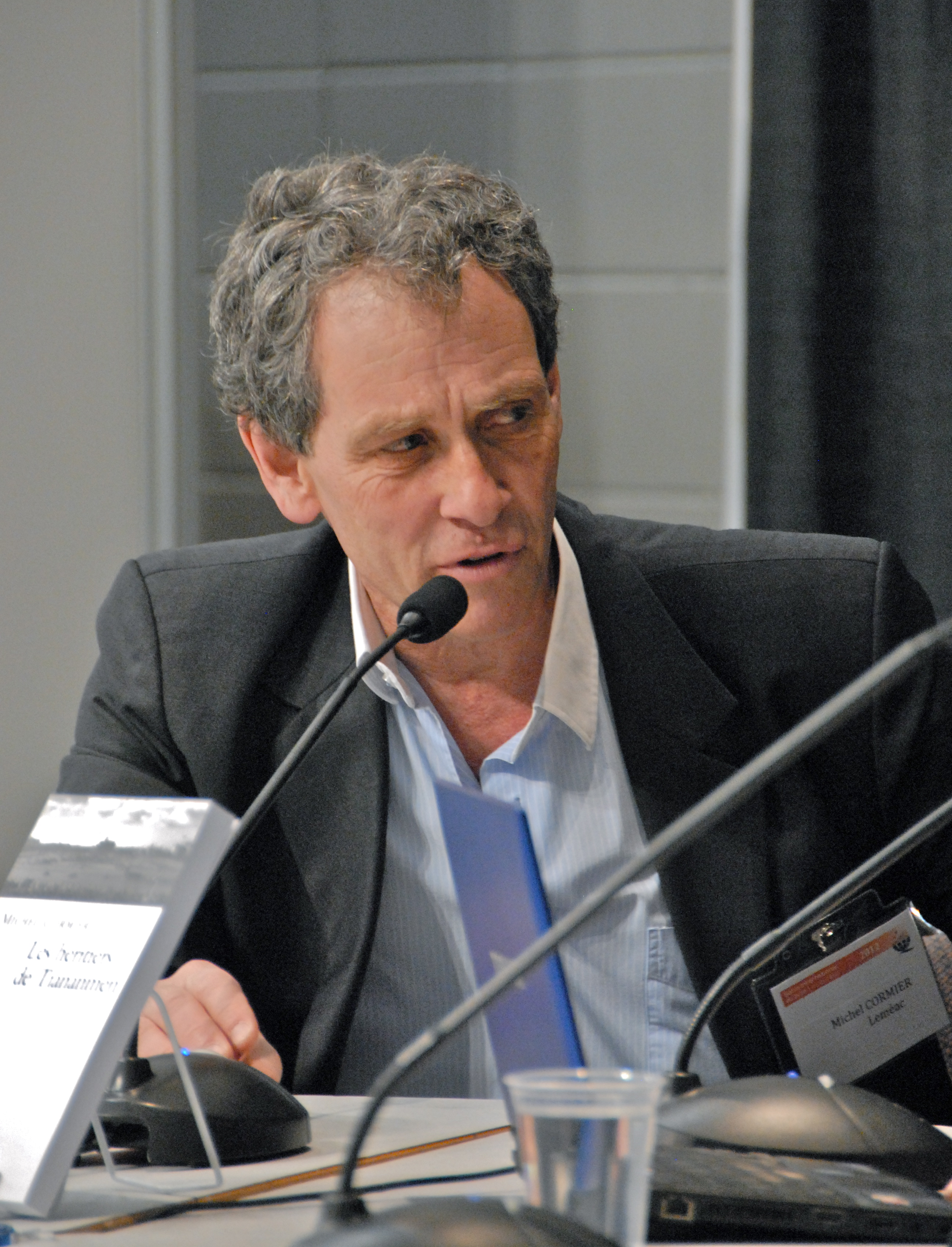
- Cormier in 2012
- Born: 1957 (age 68–69); Cocagne, New Brunswick, Canada
- Occupation: CBC News foreign correspondent

Michel Cormier (born 1957) is a Canadian journalist, lecturer and author. Cormier became the Bureau Chief for CBC News in Montreal (Radio-Canada) in 2012. He was formerly the CBC News foreign correspondent based in Beijing, China. Cormier was a foreign correspondent for CBC News in Moscow from 2000 to 2004, Paris from 2004 to 2006, and Beijing from 2006 to 2012.

Born in Cocagne, New Brunswick, in 1957, Cormer received his bachelor's degree in journalism from Carleton University in 1979 and a Master's degree in political science (foreign policy studies) from Laval University in 1986. Cormier began broadcasting career in Moncton, New Brunswick at Radio-Canada. Between 1979 and 1983, he worked as a news and current affairs reporter for television. From 1986 to 1989, he was based in Montreal, Quebec, where he produced documentaries for Présent-Dimanche, Radio-Canada's weekly current affairs show. Cormier earned the Judith-Jasmin Award for best feature reporting.

In 1989, he left Radio-Canada for CBC Radio, where he became Sunday Morning's correspondent in Ottawa, Ontario. He covered the demise of the Meech Lake Accord, the Charlottetown Accord, the beginnings of the Reform Party and the Bloc Québécois as well as the end of the Mulroney government. In 1993, Cormier became Radio-Canada's Le Point correspondent in Ottawa. He won an Anik Award for his story on the federal government mismanagement of its fleet of Challenger aircraft. In 1996, he was named Radio-Canada bureau chief at the Quebec National Assembly.

Cormier was the first Canadian journalist to enter Afghanistan in Fall 2001, a couple of weeks after the September 11 attacks.

Cormer co-authored, with Achille Michaud, a biography of the late New Brunswick Premier Richard Hatfield Un dernier train pour Hartland (Last Train for Hartland), which was shortlisted for the France-Acadie book award in 1991. In 2004, Cormier published the first biography of New-Brunswick Prime Minister Louis Robichaud written in French, entitled Louis Robichaud: une révolution si peu tranquille, for which he won the Prix France-Acadie. In 2006, he publishes a series of essays about his experiences as a foreign correspondent in Russia entitled "La Russie des illusions", which becomes a finalist for the Governor General Award in 2007.

He currently serves as the executive director of the Leaders' Debates Commission.
