= Non-reporting issuer =

Securities regulation in Canada is conducted by the various provincial securities commissions and self-regulating organizations (“SRO”) such as the MFDA and IIROC. Securities are issued under the authority and oversight of these bodies with the result that a broad range of rules apply to companies seeking to raise capital and to the parties acting as their agents in such transactions. However, there is a useful simplification that can be applied in Canada to provide some clarity for issuers - based on the criteria below securities issuers fall into two broad categories:

== Reporting Issuers (“RI”) ==
- prospectus offerings
- exchange listed
- highest level of mandatory regulatory compliance
- higher G&A
- most expensive to raise capital

== Non-Reporting Issuers (“NRI”) ==
- exempt offerings (OM; accredited investors)
- non-listed
- lower level of mandatory regulatory compliance (mostly dictated by constating document of the issuer)
- generally lower G&A
- generally less expensive to raise capital
- tends to be smaller issuers with unique ideas or niche strategies

== Difference Between NRIs and RIs ==
A common question is what are the differences between RIs and NRIs and does either type of security have clear benefits over the other? To answer the question investors must consider

- Reporting requirements; initial and on-going
- Exchange Listing; volatility
- Liquidity
- Costs that reduce returns

== Due Diligence - Disclosure & Selling Agent ==
Regardless whether investing in RIs or NRIs conducting diligence is important. When securities are being sold (capital is being raised) by an issuer, there are two main factors that come into play to assist with investor protection:

1) Disclosure requirements

- prospectus or an offering memorandum ("OM")
- ongoing financial statements
- reporting of material events

2) Regulation of those that sell the securities

- Recent change in rules with adoption of NI 31-103
- Exempt Issuers used to be able to raise capital without using registered securities dealers or Registrants (OLD) but CSA has introduced new rules surrounding registration requirements for exempt offerings - now have to use Exempt Market Dealers (NEW)
- Exempt issuers still limited ability in West to sell without using registrants (under the western provinces blanket exemption) however the lack of a registrant should perhaps be considered a red flag to investors. Alberta, British Columbia, Manitoba, the Northwest Territories, Nunavut and the Yukon Territory will each pass a blanket order exempting individuals and firms from the EMD registration requirement created in NI 31-1-3. As presently cast, the Blanket Order would provide an exemption where a firm or person trades in securities under one of the following capital-raising exemptions in National Instrument 45-106 – Prospectus and Registration Exemptions:
- accredited investor;
- family, friends and business associates;
- offering memorandum; or
- CAD$150,000 minimum purchase.

Some examples of Canadian non-reporting issuers:

- Mineral Fields
- Enervue
- Agcapita Farmland Investment Partnership
- Petrocapita Income Trust

== See also ==
- Trust (law)
- Accredited investor
- Canada Revenue Agency
- Mutual fund
- Income fund
- Exchange fund
- Exempt Market Dealer
