= Bill Morneau =

39th Canadian Minister of Finance

The Honourable Bill Morneau PC
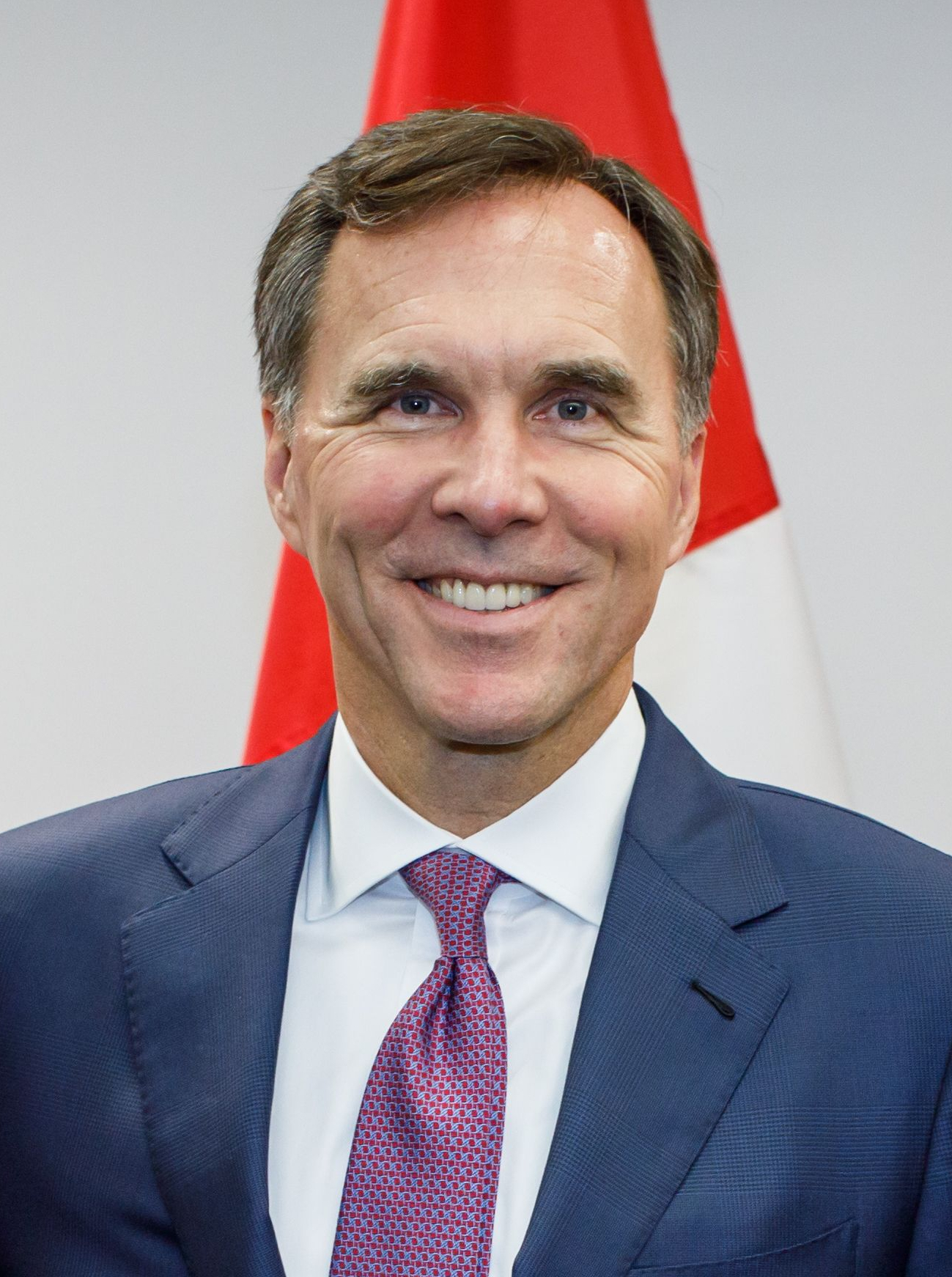
- Morneau in 2020

Minister of Finance
- In office November 4, 2015 – August 17, 2020
- Prime Minister: Justin Trudeau
- Preceded by: Joe Oliver
- Succeeded by: Chrystia Freeland

Member of Parliament for Toronto Centre
- In office October 19, 2015 – August 17, 2020
- Preceded by: Chrystia Freeland
- Succeeded by: Marci Ien

Personal details
- Born: William Francis Morneau Jr. October 7, 1962 (age 64) Toronto, Ontario, Canada
- Party: Liberal
- Spouse: Nancy McCain
- Relatives: Eleanore A. Cronk (aunt)
- Education: University of Western Ontario (BA); INSEAD (MBA); London School of Economics (MSc)

William Francis Morneau Jr. PC (born October 7, 1962) is a Canadian businessman and former politician who served as minister of finance and member of Parliament (MP) for Toronto Centre from 2015 to 2020.

Morneau was the executive chairman of Canada's largest human resources firm, Morneau Shepell (now TELUS Health), and the former chair of the C. D. Howe Institute. He was also the chair of the board at St. Michael's Hospital, and Covenant House. Morneau holds a bachelor of arts (BA) degree from the University of Western Ontario, a master of business administration degree (MBA) from INSEAD, and a master's degree in economics from the London School of Economics.

As finance minister, Morneau expanded the Canada Pension Plan, introduced the Canada Child Benefit, and oversaw government aid during the first five months of the COVID-19 pandemic.

Morneau currently serves as chair of NovaSource Power Services, director at CIBC and Clairvest Group Inc., chair of the advisory board of Magnet at Toronto Metropolitan University, chair of the Canadian Ditchley Foundation, and co-chair of the National Arts Centre’s The Next Act campaign. He is a distinguished fellow at the Munk School of Global Affairs and Public Policy, an executive-in-residence at the Rotman School of Management, a visiting senior fellow at the London School of Economics and Political Science, a senior fellow at the C.D. Howe Institute, and a visiting fellow at Nuffield College, University of Oxford. In 2023, he released his book Where to From Here: A Path to Canadian Prosperity, outlining his views on how Canadian economic policy can increase prosperity.

Morneau has been named as the next Board Chair of CIBC, effective January 1st, 2027.

== Early and personal life ==
Morneau's parents are William Francis "Frank" Morneau Sr. who came from Walkerville, Windsor, Ontario, and Helen (Lynch) Morneau, who came from Adjala Township, Alliston, Ontario. Their families had deep roots in both areas. Bill Morneau's father, Frank Morneau, founded the actuarial and benefit consulting firm W.F. Morneau & Associates in 1966.

Morneau was born in Toronto at St. Joseph's Health Centre and attended Senator O'Connor College School. From 1981 to 1986, Morneau attended the University of Western Ontario and completed an Honours BA as an undergraduate, he spent one year at the University of Grenoble in France. He then earned an MBA from INSEAD. Morneau eventually went on to earn a master of science (MSc) in economics from the London School of Economics.

He lives in Toronto with his wife Nancy McCain, a member of the New Brunswick family which owns McCain Foods, and has four children—Henry, Clare, Edward and Grace. Grace is originally from Northern Uganda, and the couple sponsored her to join their family in 2010.

Morneau and his wife have made significant donations to international development programs. This has included the founding of a school for refugee girls in Kakuma refugee camp, and the creation of a scholarship program for refugee girls at the University of Toronto.

== Business career ==
Bill Morneau had demonstrated an interest in business and entrepreneurship from a young age. At 17, Morneau and a friend started a business servicing swimming pools for homeowners, mostly in the Toronto neighbourhood of Don Mills. Morneau ran the business for four years, helping him pay a good part of his university tuition.

W.F. Morneau & Associates was an actuarial and benefits consulting firm; Morneau's father, Frank, founded the company and was the CEO. Morneau joined the company in 1990, and two years later was given the role of president. In 1997, Morneau replaced his father as CEO.

In the years when Morneau ran the firm, the company absorbed competitors across Canada as it grew to become the nation's biggest player in the sector. In 1992, the firm bought the Canadian actuarial consulting businesses of Coopers & Lybrand, followed by the 1997 acquisition of Sobeco, a large Quebec-based pension and benefit businesses, from Ernst & Young. In 1998, Morneau also acquired the Canadian pension consulting practice of Deloitte & Touche.

In 2008, Morneau's firm also bought Shepell FGI—a group that helped companies provide mental health and emotional counselling to employees—and changed its name to Morneau Shepell. As executive chair of Morneau Shepell, Morneau led the firm through a period of growth from a few hundred people in 1992 to almost 4000 employees in 2015 - becoming the largest Canadian human resources services organization, with offices across North America. Under his leadership the firm went through several significant changes, including going public on the Toronto Stock Exchange in 2005. Morneau Shepell provides over 20,000 organizations representing millions of Canadians with pension, employee benefit, and employee assistance programs.

Morneau is the co-author of The Real Retirement, an analysis of the context and the factors involved in helping Canadians plan for a successful retirement originally published in 2012 with Frederick Vettese, as well a book on his time in office Where to From Here: A Path to Canadian Prosperity.

== Public life ==
Morneau was chair of the board at St. Michael's Hospital from 2009 to 2013, and as a board member from 2003 to 2013. He has also served on the board of St. Michael's Hospital Foundation (2013–2015).

Morneau also served as the chair of Covenant House (1997–2000), and chair of the C.D. Howe Institute (2010–2014). He has served as a board member for the Loran Scholars Foundation (2008—2015), the Art Gallery of Ontario Foundation (2004–2011), the Canadian Opera Company (2001–2010), Greenwood College School (2012–2015), the Toronto Zoo Foundation (2000–2004), and several others.

In 2010, Morneau began leading an initiative with the UNHCR to open a secondary school for refugee girls in Kakuma refugee camp, Kenya. Opened in 2014, today the school is home to 352 girls, representing 15 per cent of the total secondary school female enrolment in the Kakuma Camp. The day-to-day operation of the school rests with the Windle Trust and its team of 18 teachers, including eight women, and a staff of 20.

Morneau was appointed as pension investment advisor to the Ontario minister of finance, Dwight Duncan in 2012, providing counsel aimed at facilitating the pooling of public-sector pension fund assets. His report led to the eventual establishment of Investment Management Corporation of Ontario, which now pools funds and offers public-sector pension plans lower costs with economies of scale. In 2014, he was appointed by the premier of Ontario, Kathleen Wynne to an expert panel to advise on how to support the 3.5 million workers in Ontario who would not receive a comparable workplace pension after their retirement. This led to the creation of the Ontario Retirement Pension Plan, which was later withdrawn when Morneau became the federal minister of finance and the Canada Pension Plan was expanded.

== Seeking election ==
In his 20 May 2014 Liberal Party of Canada convention speech, Morneau stated his motivation to run for public office stemmed from seeing important changes going on in the lives of Canadians through his exposure running the largest human resources firm in Canada, Morneau Shepell.

On the pensions side of his businesses, he saw changes in employee plans, with the burden for saving shifting from corporations to individuals, leaving employees much more vulnerable in retirement. Employee benefit plans were also getting costlier—making hospitalizations, prescription meds, and dental and eye care harder to afford. In the employee assistance part of his business, he saw a rising anxiety among Canadians, and a matched increase in mental health challenges. Through these experiences, Morneau said he began thinking seriously about helping people on a broader scale and that led him to eventually run for the Liberal Party nomination in the downtown riding of Toronto Centre.

On October 19, 2015, Morneau was elected as the member of Parliament for Toronto Centre with 57.9% of the vote. He was then named by Prime Minister Justin Trudeau as minister of finance for Canada on November 4, 2015, becoming the first rookie MP to hold the position.

== Minister of Finance (2015–2020) ==
=== Responsibilities ===
As minister of finance, Morneau was responsible for directing more than $300 billion in revenues via the federal budget each year. Administering tariffs and financial regulations were also part of his portfolio. Additional responsibilities included overseeing the Bank of Canada, the Royal Canadian Mint, and the Canada Pension Plan (CPP) Investment Board, among others. Morneau represented Canada at international gatherings, including the G7 and G20 Summits, in addition to serving as governor of the International Monetary Fund and World Bank.

=== Federal budgets ===
On 22 March 2016, Morneau released his first budget as minister of finance. Items of note in the budget included $120 billion over 10 years for public infrastructure—focusing on transit, water, waste management and housing—as well as the introduction of the Canada Child Benefit. The budget also included money for First Nations communities, as well as larger seniors and employment insurance benefits.

On 22 March 2017, Morneau released his second budget. The budget included new federal investments in early learning and child care, more flexible benefits for family caregivers, more support for Indigenous women, and a national strategy to address gender-based violence. Additionally, Budget 2017 included $11.2-billion for an 11-year national housing strategy.

On 27 February 2018 Morneau's third budget continued the theme of greater equality for women in Canada, with money targeting new parental supports, gender equality and anti-harassment initiatives, as well as measures to promote pay equity. The budget also included new investments to tackle the opioid crisis, cope with a surge in asylum seekers crossing the border from the United States and improve living conditions for Indigenous people.

On 21 November 2018 Morneau spoke to Parliament on a "fiscal update" with an increased expenditure of $17.6 billion over six years.

On 19 March 2019, Morneau tabled his fourth, and final, budget. The stated goals of the budget were to help Canadians feel a greater sense of financial security, gain new career skills, and be able to afford a first home. This budget also took "initial steps" toward a national pharmacare program by creating a national drug agency with the aim of bulk-buying drugs to lower costs.

==== Stance on budget deficits ====
Morneau received criticism for abandoning the Liberal's 2015 platform commitment to run annual deficits of less than $10 billion during the first couple years of their mandate, and return to balance by 2019–20. A few months after taking office, he abandoned those vows, citing a weaker-than-expected economy. He then committed to continuing to reduce the government net debt-to-GDP ratio, arguing it's a better measure of government fiscal health.

=== Intergovernmental affairs and internal trade ===
Between April and November 2019, Morneau was asked to take on the additional portfolio of intergovernmental affairs and internal trade in addition to the finance portfolio, filling in for Dominic LeBlanc who stepped down for health reasons. In the role, Morneau acted as the federal liaison to the provincial and territorial governments to encourage collaboration and trade.

=== Gender equality ===
Morneau tabled Canada's first gender-based budget and introduced a banknote featuring civil-rights activist Viola Desmond, making it Canada's first circulation banknote to feature a Canadian woman, and the first to feature a Black woman.

=== Small business tax changes ===
The Liberal government changes to small business taxation, proposed in 2017, were a controversial issue during Morneau's tenure as finance minister. The changes involve restricting several tax planning strategies, including passive investment income and income-sprinkling for private corporations, that are often used by small businesses. In response to the criticism, Morneau made several changes, including reducing the overall small business tax rate from 11% to 9%.

=== Ethics scrutiny ===
In September 2017, Morneau was fined for failing to disclose to the Conflict of Interest and Ethics Commissioner a private non-commercial real estate holding company in Avignon, France owned by him and his wife, which owns a family property in Provence, France. Morneau said that this was a result of early administrative confusion which led to only the property, and not the legal structure, being disclosed.

Morneau was also investigated in 2018, over false accusations of insider trading, and in 2020 for his family accepting $41,000 in luxury hospitality from WE Charity, which he paid back before publicly revealing the error. The commissioner determined that Morneau did not breach ethics laws in either of these investigations.

Although never investigated by the commissioner, Morneau also received public criticism in the Fall of 2017 for not holding his assets in a blind trust, something he was incorrectly reported to have done. This included a significant number of Morneau Shepell shares. Morneau responded to this criticism by selling the shares, donating a portion of the proceeds to charity, and setting up a blind trust for his remaining assets.

=== Other policies ===
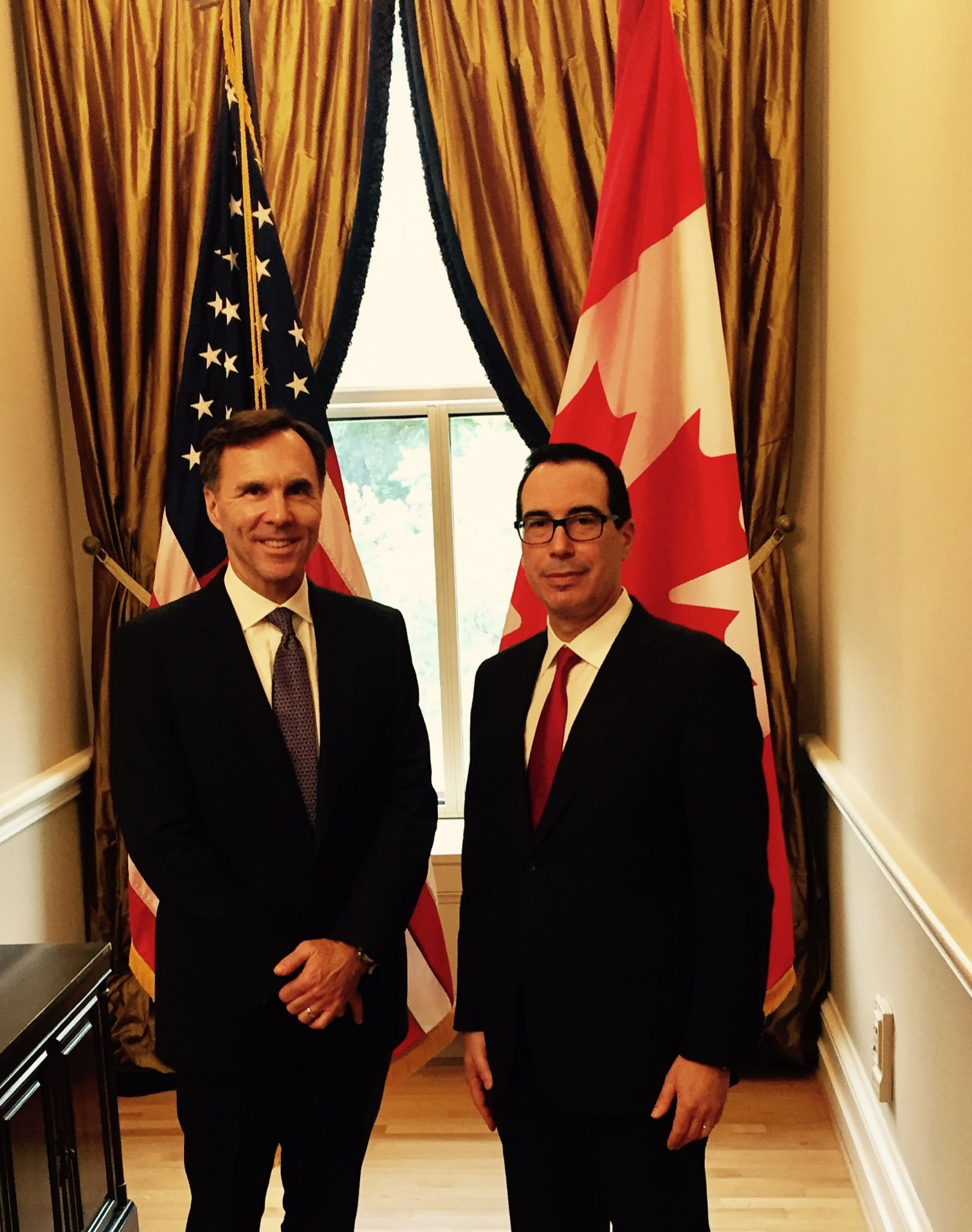
Morneau with Steven Mnuchin in June 2017

Morneau played a key role in implementing a number of signature Liberal government initiatives, including new benefits for parents, low-income workers and seniors, putting in place Carbon pricing in Canada, as well as expanding the Canada Pension Plan. Morneau also moved forward with the Liberal's commitment to lower income taxes on the middle class by raising taxes on the wealthiest Canadians.

Morneau established the Advisory Council on Economic Growth.

Morneau reached an agreement in 2016 with provincial and territorial governments to expand the Canada Pension Plan. The expanded CPP was designed to address the shortfall in middle-income retirement planning that is opening up as a result of disappearing corporate pensions.

In 2017, Morneau also led negotiations on new health care funding agreements with the provinces and territories. In August 2017, all provinces and territories agreed to a Common Statement of Principles on Shared Health Priorities, which outlines common priorities for action in home and community care, and in mental health and addiction services.

=== COVID-19 aid ===
Morneau was responsible for the first five months of the federal government's economic response plan to the COVID-19 pandemic in Canada. Major initiatives between March and August 2020 included:

- Canada Emergency Business Account, which provided emergency interest-free loans to small businesses and nonprofit organizations.
- Canada Emergency Response Benefit, which provided a taxable benefit of CA$2,000 per month for Canadian residents facing unemployment due to the pandemic.
- Canada Emergency Student Benefit, which was a counterpart to CERB to help students.
- Canada Emergency Wage Subsidy, which provided financial support for businesses and prevent large layoffs.

In a fiscal update tabled on July 8, Morneau projected that the deficit for the 2020 fiscal year would reach $343.2 billion. The budget tabled in April 2021 showed the deficit for 2020 at $327.7 billion.

=== Resignation ===
On August 17, 2020, following a meeting with the Prime Minister earlier in the day, Morneau held a press conference announcing he would step down as Minister of Finance and as the Member of Parliament for Toronto Centre, and that he would seek to become secretary-general of the Organization for Economic Cooperation and Development (OECD).

Morneau's resignation came amid reports of disagreements with Trudeau over the scandal, environmental initiatives, and COVID-19 relief spending. Morneau dismissed the reports and said his relationship with Trudeau was marked by "vigorous discussion and debate" that led to better policy. In 2023, Morneau cited disagreements with Trudeau over COVID-19 relief spending and overreach of the Prime Minister's office as the reason for his resignation.

Morneau was succeeded as finance minister by Deputy Prime Minister Chrystia Freeland. Morneau was succeeded as MP in the by-election by Marci Ien.

== After politics ==
On January 26, 2021, Morneau terminated his candidacy for the position of secretary-general of the OECD.

In 2021, Morneau was a Senior Fellow at Yale University's Jackson Institute for Global Affairs, where he taught a course on global economic policy making.

In May 2021, Morneau was found to have violated Canada's Conflict of Interest Act.

Morneau currently serves as chair of NovaSource Power Services, director at CIBC and Clairvest Group Inc., chair of the advisory board of Magnet at Toronto Metropolitan University, chair of the Canadian Ditchley Foundation, and co-chair of the National Arts Centre’s The Next Act campaign. He is a distinguished fellow at the Munk School of Global Affairs and Public Policy, an executive-in-residence at the Rotman School of Management, a visiting senior fellow at the London School of Economics and Political Science, a senior fellow at the C.D. Howe Institute, and a visiting fellow at Nuffield College, University of Oxford. In 2023, he released his book Where to From Here: A Path to Canadian Prosperity, outlining his views on how Canadian economic policy can increase prosperity.

== Electoral record ==
2019 Canadian federal election: Toronto Centre
Party	Candidate	Votes	%	±%	Expenditures
Liberal	Bill Morneau	31,271	57.37	−0.53	$95,538.84
New Democratic	Brian Chang	12,142	22.27	−4.34	$58,656.81
Conservative	Ryan Lester	6,613	12.13	−0.06	$39,309.94
Green	Annamie Paul	3,852	7.07	+4.47	$34,903.20
Animal Protection	Rob Lewin	182	0.33	–	$2,171.71
Rhinoceros	Sean Carson	147	0.27	–	–
Independent	Jason Tavares	126	0.23	–	–
Communist	Bronwyn Cragg	125	0.23	−0.03	$626.58
Marxist–Leninist	Philip Fernandez	54	0.10	−0.05	–
Total valid votes/expense limit		54,512	99.30	–	$107,308.65
Total rejected ballots		384	0.70	+0.18	
Turnout		54,896	66.08	−3.27	
Eligible voters		83,076			
Liberal hold		Swing		+1.90	
Source: Elections Canada

2015 Canadian federal election
Party	Candidate	Votes	%	±%	Expenditures
Liberal	Bill Morneau	29,297	57.90	+8.52	$170,325.26
New Democratic	Linda McQuaig	13,467	26.61	−9.69	$198,294.34
Conservative	Julian Di Battista	6,167	12.19	+3.56	$22,625.73
Green	Colin Biggin	1,315	2.60	−0.37	$3,964.97
Independent	Jordan Stone	147	0.29	–	–
Communist	Mariam Ahmad	133	0.26	–	–
Marxist–Leninist	Philip Fernandez	76	0.15	+0.03	–
Total valid votes/expense limit		50,602	100.0		$203,952.21
Total rejected ballots		266	–	–	–
Turnout		50,868	–	–	–
Eligible voters		66,351	–	–	–
Source: Elections Canada

29th Canadian Ministry (2015–2025) – Cabinet of Justin Trudeau
Cabinet post (1)
Predecessor	Office	Successor
Joe Oliver	Minister of Finance; November 4, 2015 – August 17, 2020	Chrystia Freeland
