= Alfred Apps =

Canadian lawyer, businessman and activist

William Alfred Apps (born 1957) is a Canadian lawyer, businessman and prominent political activist who served as the national President of the Liberal Party of Canada and as Executive Vice President of the Ontario Liberal Party. Apps is associated with a number of philanthropic and charitable causes and is currently based in Toronto.

== Education and personal life ==
Alfred Apps was born in Brantford, Ontario, in 1957, the son of Arthur Carlyle Apps (1933–2022) and Margaret Imogene (Gracey) Apps (1932–2005), the eldest of seven children. He spent his formative years in Woodstock, Ontario and attended high school at Woodstock Collegiate Institute. Apps served as Prime Minister of his high school students' council in 1974–75.

While completing his undergraduate studies at Huron College at the University of Western Ontario (now Huron University College at the Western University), he served as president of both Huron Students' Council in 1978-79 and the Western University Students' Council in 1979-80. He obtained his undergraduate degree in philosophy and economics in 1979. He was the recipient of the 2017 Alumni Award of Distinction from Huron University College. In 2019, Apps made a substantial donation to Huron for the restoration a historical building and turning it into Huron's international student hub. The building was formally named the Apps International House.

He graduated from the University of Toronto law school in 1984 and was called to the Ontario bar in 1987.

Apps was first married to Teri Kirk, a prominent corporate lawyer, founder of the Funding Portal and published author, with whom he had a daughter. He was later married to author Danielle French, the podcaster who hosted Netflix's Taste of the Country, with whom he had four daughters, including Olivia Apps, captain of the Canadian Olympic Women's Rugby Team and Paris 2024 Olympic silver medalist. She was also a member of the Canadian Women's Rugby Team when it finished second at the 2025 Women's Rugby World Cup and is currently playing professionally for the Saracens F.C. in the UK's Premiership Women's Rugby League, where, in her debut year, she was recognized as the League's Player of the Season.

== Professional career ==
Apps joined Fasken as an associate in 1989 and was named partner in 1991. In 1993, he withdrew from the partnership on being named CEO of the Lehndorff Group (an international commercial real estate firm with assets in Canada, the United States and Europe), where he led a 47-lender $1 billion debt restructuring and oversaw the creation of one of Canada's first Real Estate Investment Trusts; ResREIT which merged into CAPREIT in 2004.

In 1998 he led a business combination between the Lehndorff Group and Dundee Realty Corporation (now Dream Unlimited) and, following a short period as President and COO of the successor corporation, was appointed CEO of Newstar Technologies Inc. In 2001, upon completing a merger of Newstar with three of its principal U.S. competitors together with a US$140 million first-round equity financing, he rejoined the partnership at Fasken Martineau, practiced corporate/commercial law specializing in corporate mergers, acquisitions and financings. In 2012, he then moved his practice to Wildeboer Dellelce LLP, a corporate, securities and tax firm he helped found in 1993. In 2015, he joined Miller Thomson LLP where he was head of the firm's national structured finance and securitization practice until 2024.

Over his career, Apps has led companies and raised capital in Canada, the United States and Europe. He also serves and has served on the Board of Directors of a number of public and private companies.

Apps has been recognized as a leading counsel in the area of restructuring, mergers and acquisitions, private equity investment and infrastructure finance. He has been ranked by Lexpert and UK-based Practical Law Company as one of Canada's leading lawyers in these fields. In 2009, he acted as debtor counsel in the $32BN restructuring of the Canadian third party (i.e. non-bank) asset-backed commercial paper market, the largest debt restructuring in Canadian history.

== Political career ==
Although involved politically from the age of 15, Apps first came to prominence within the Liberal party in 1979 when, at age 22, he was elected executive vice-president of the Ontario Liberal Party. He also served as a summer intern in the office of Solicitor General Bob Kaplan. While studying law, he was a speechwriter for David Peterson, then Leader of the Opposition in Ontario, as well as for several cabinet ministers in the last Canadian government led by Pierre Trudeau.

=== National prominence at the 1982 convention ===
Apps gained national prominence and notoriety in 1982 orchestrating Resolution 40, an initiative of the Young Liberals of Canada brought to the plenary floor of the Liberal Party of Canada 1982 convention. The resolution condemned "the view that elections and party life should revolve around polls, propaganda and patronage orchestrated by a small elite", charges viewed by some senior party figures as an attack on Prime Minister Pierre Trudeau and his close advisors, Senator Keith Davey, and former principal secretary, Jim Coutts, who had lost the Spadina byelection in the previous summer. Apps' original resolution specifically cited Coutts' by-election fiasco and his subsequent re-nomination as "manipulative electoral shams", but youth delegates voted to drop that portion, a concession that mollified many delegates who previously felt compelled to oppose the resolution. Apps denied that the criticism was directed at Trudeau personally, but acknowledged that the resolution was aimed directly at Coutts and Davey Apps softened his stance at the convention and stated that he respected Davey and was not seeking his ouster but added, "we should start talking about a new perspective on his role in the party." Despite pushback by several cabinet ministers, delegates to the convention adopted the resolution by an overwhelming margin. Apps leveraged his increased prominence in the party the following February in securing the highest vote count when the party's Ontario wing elected its representatives to the party's reform commission. In the decades that followed, Apps spearheaded the launch of a party reform movement which culminated in the National Reform Convention of the Liberal Party, held in Halifax in 1985.

At the close of the 1982 convention, newly elected party president Iona Campagnolo prophetically drew comparison of Apps to Davey, "It seems to me that 30 years ago Keith Davey was in the same position as Alfred is today and 30 years from now Alfred will be in the same position as Keith Davey is today." Campagnolo would be proved prescient but her prediction modest. Apps would wield substantial backroom influence even in the decade that immediately followed and, in 30 years, Apps would have finished his three year service as a successor to Campagnolo in the role of party president.

=== Frontline candidate to backroom power broker ===
Having been a key supporter of John Turner's leadership bid, Apps was persuaded to stand as a Liberal candidate in both federal elections during Turner's leadership, in 1984 and 1988, in his home riding of Oxford, a largely rural riding covering a portion of Brant country where Apps was raised. Oxford is a district where the Liberals had been routinely trounced by conservative with margins of 20 to 50 percentage points. The party last held the seat under McKenzie King and, as such, the prospects for an Apps victory were extremely slim even if the Liberals were to win a robust majority mandate. Apps was defeated by three-term incumbent Progressive Conservative Bruce Halliday by significant margin in 1984, when the Liberals suffered their worst defeat in history up to that point. However, Apps came within 3% of ousting Halliday in 1988. Apps' vote tally in 1988 was a new high watermark for the Liberals in the district, and was only surpassed once in the following decades, when Liberal MP John Baird Finlay (Apps' former high school principal) won the riding in the subsequent 1993 election, when the Liberals won 98 of Ontario's 99 seats in a landslide victory. The Liberals held the seat until 2004, when Finley retired but, since then, the Conservatives have retained the seat without interruption.

During the 1993 federal election that returned the Liberals to power, Apps worked with Ontario campaign chair Senator David Smith leading the Liberals' candidate recruitment and election readiness effort for Greater Toronto Area. The Liberals swept all seats in Greater Toronto and all but one seat in Ontario in that election.

Apps was instrumental in recruiting a number of prominent Liberal politicians into public life including former Prime Minister Paul Martin, former Liberal Leader Michael Ignatieff and the first female black Member of Parliament and Cabinet Minister, Jean Augustine. He was also a backer of Ignatieff's 2006 and 2008 Liberal leadership bids.

=== Key player in leadership contests ===
In the 1984 leadership contest, he was described in the press as one of the most vocal supporters of former finance minister and eventual winner John Turner. He was later named the chief Ontario organizer for Turner's successful campaign. Apps played a definitive, behind-the-scenes role as a key organizer who helped recruit Paul Martin into public life, paving the way for Martin's eventual tenure as Finance Minister and Prime Minister. However, unlike most of his fellow Turner supporters, Apps declined to support Paul Martin in the 1990 contest due to Martin's stance on the Meech Lake Accord. but, rather than support Jean Chretien, he elected to remain neutral out of respect for Martin.

Adding a twist to the fulfilment of Campagnolo's prophecy, Apps became a close ally of Ian Davey, son of the backroom Rainmaker he denounced at the 1982 convention. Together they collaborated in making the leadership bids of two unlikely candidates viable. In the 2003 contest, they were lead strategists for the later-aborted bid of John Manley, a long time cabinet minister with limited organizational capacity and charisma. Manley had been thrust into the role of deputy premier by Prime Minister Chretien in a last ditch effort to stop stem the growing momentum of Paul Martin's candidacy. Manley withdrew from the leadership race and endorsed Paul Martin in July 2003 when it became clear that Martin had an insurmountable lead. Later that year Manley announced his retirement from politics.

Following Martin's coronation as leader and Prime Minister, Apps and Davey, along with Dan Brock (a former aide to Manley and law partner of Apps), and Paul Lalonde, son of former Trudeau era minister Marc Lalonde, persuaded Michael Ignatieff, a prominent Canadian academic and author, to run for Parliament in the 2006 election in Etobicoke Lakeshore, to replace Jean Augustine, Canada's first Black Canadian woman to serve as a federal Minister of the Crown and Member of Parliament, who had decided to resign her seat after being sidelined by Martin in the post 2004 election cabinet shuffle. Apps and Augustine were close as he had recruited her to run in the 1993 election when he was Election Readiness Chair for the City of Toronto. Ignatieff was an academic celebrity who gained his fame over three decades teaching and living in the United Kingdom and United States. At the time, he was head of the Carr Center for Human Rights Policy at the Harvard Kennedy School. With tacit support of party president Mike Eizenga, who had been his undergraduate philosophy student colleague at Huron University College, Apps leveraged Ignatieff's appeal as a celebrity academic with international fame in inducing invitations for Ignatieff to speak at numerous liberal gatherings in 2004 and 2005, and secured him the prime keynote speaker spot at the party's 2005 convention. With the support of Apps and his team, Ignatieff secured the party's Etobicoke Lakeshore nomination and went on to win the seat in the 2006 election.

However, in the wake of the Liberal defeat in the 2006 election and Prime Minister Martin's sudden and unexpected resignation, everything changed. All of the sudden, Apps and his team were prematurely confronted by pressure from prominent Liberals (including former Ontario Premier David Peterson, former Ontario campaign chair for the party Senator David Smith and a majority of federal Liberal caucus members, to persuade Ignatieff to pursue the party leadership. With a reputation of charisma earned from stints as a BBC broadcast journalist, Ignatieff proved to be a much easier sell than their previous candidate, Manley, especially with the youth organizers not aligned with the Martin leadership team who were feeling untapped. Apps and his team steered the rapid buildup of Ignatieff's leadership campaign while much of the party was still in shell shock as a result of the election defeat, vaulting Ignatieff to frontrunner status in the 2006 leadership contest.

=== Party president, 2009 to 2012 ===
Apps was acclaimed as president of the Liberal Party of Canada at the party's May 2009 convention held in Vancouver. At the same convention, Ignatieff was confirmed as party leader without contest, after rivals Dominic Leblanc and Bob Rae both withdrew from the contests a few months earlier.

Following the party's historic defeated in the 2011 election, Apps as party president was responsible for steering the party through the first phase of rebuilding and for the publication of the Party's "Roadmap to Renewal", together with a paper entitled "Building a Modern Liberal Party". His term concluded at the Liberal Biennial Convention in Ottawa on January 15, 2012 where party members approved several modernizing reforms to the party's structure as well as a policy resolution to legalize the use of cannabis. He was succeeded by Mike Crawley, who was elected at the 2012 convention in a competitive 4-way race over former Deputy Prime Minister Sheila Copps.

== Other affiliations and activities ==
In addition to being a longtime member of the Board of Governors of Huron University College Corporation, Apps served as Chair of the Foundation Board for the Centre for Addiction and Mental Health in 2006–2007. He was President of the Empire Club of Canada for the 2009–2010 year and has been active in a number of arts and youth-oriented charities.

An active Anglican, he also served on committees of the Executive Council of the Provincial Synod of the Ecclesiastical Province of Ontario.

Since retiring from the practice of law, he has continued to serve on a number of corporate boards and mentored several entrepreneurs with early-stage companies.

He was awarded the King Charles III Coronation Medal in 2025.

== Electoral Record ==
1984 Canadian federal election
Party	Candidate	Votes	%	±%
Progressive Conservative	Bruce Halliday	25,642	57.1	+11.2
Liberal	Alfred Apps	12,884	28.7	-8.1
New Democratic	Wayne Colbran	6,077	13.5	-2.8
Libertarian	Kaye Sargent	322	0.7	0.0
Total valid votes		44,925	100.0	

1988 Canadian federal election
Party	Candidate	Votes	%	±%
Progressive Conservative	Bruce Halliday	19,367	39.75	-17.3
Liberal	Alfred Apps	18,035	37.02	+8.3
New Democratic	Brian Donlevy	7,771	15.95	+2.4
Christian Heritage	Hans Strikwerda	3,190	6.55	
Libertarian	Kaye Sargent	187	0.38	-0.3
Commonwealth of Canada	Sharon Rounds	166	0.34	
Total valid votes		48,716	100.0	

Party political offices
Preceded by Doug Ferguson	President of the Liberal Party of Canada; 2009–2012	Succeeded by Mike Crawley
