= Annamie Paul =

Canadian activist, lawyer and politician (born 1972)

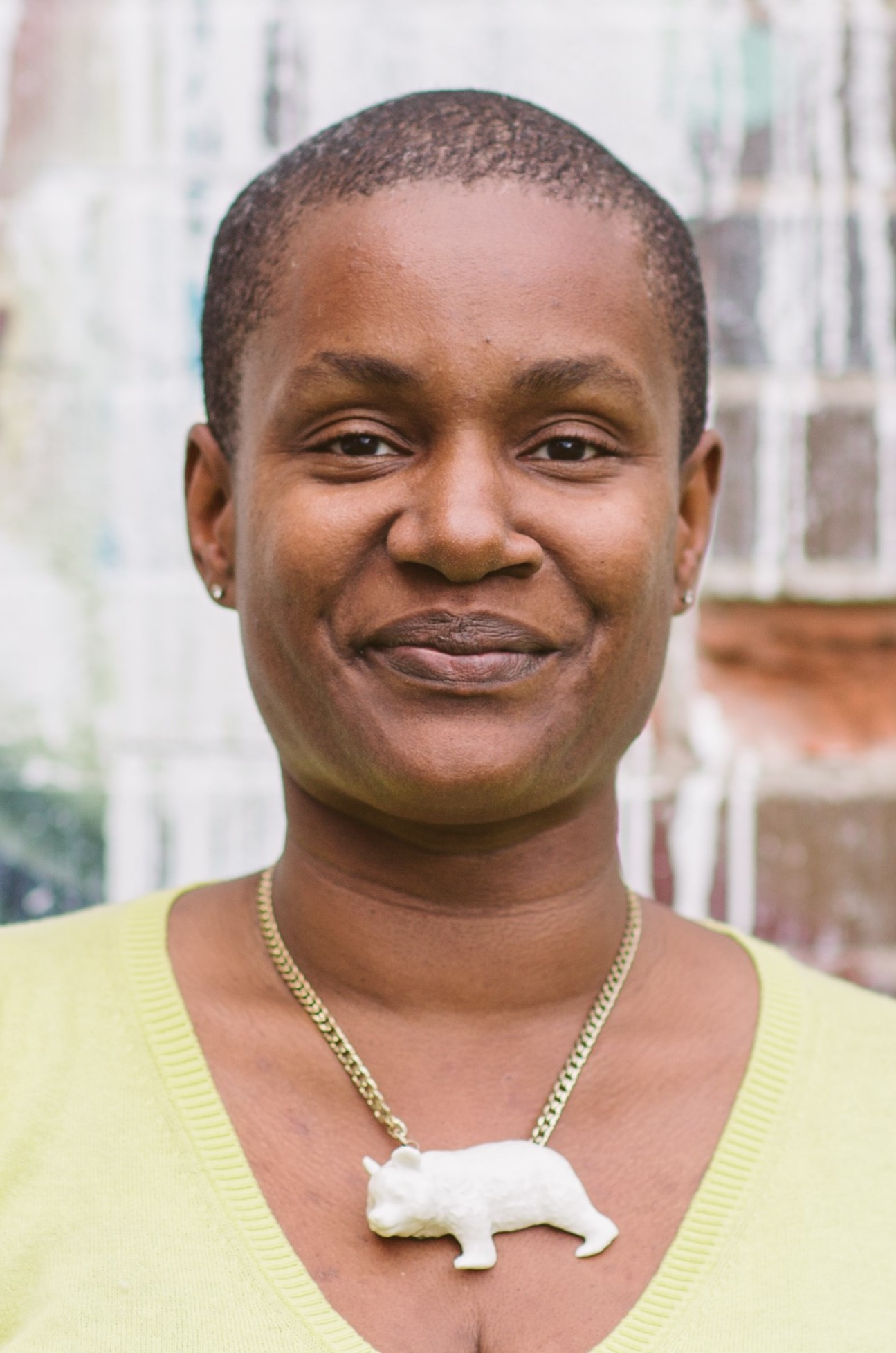
- Paul in 2020

Leader of the Green Party of Canada
- In office October 3, 2020 – November 14, 2021
- Preceded by: Jo-Ann Roberts (interim)
- Succeeded by: Amita Kuttner (interim)

Personal details
- Born: November 3, 1972 (age 54) Toronto, Ontario, Canada
- Party: Green (until 2021)
- Spouse: Mark Freeman (m. 1996)
- Relatives: Ngozi Paul (sister)
- Education: University of Ottawa (LLB); Princeton University (MPAff)
- Website: annamiepaul.ca

Annamie Paul (born November 3, 1972) is a Canadian activist, lawyer, and former politician who served as the leader of the Green Party of Canada from 2020 to 2021. She was the first Black Canadian and first Jewish woman to be elected leader of a federal party in Canada. (Note: Vivian Barbot was the first Black Canadian and visible minority to lead a federal party with representation (Bloc Québécois). She was not elected to the role and was selected on an interim basis.)

Paul founded the Canadian Centre for Political Leadership, and served as its executive director from 2001 to 2005, before serving in civic engagement and international affairs positions, including in political affairs in Canada's Mission to the European Union and in the Office of the Prosecutor at the International Criminal Court.

First standing for election in the 2019 Canadian federal election for Toronto Centre, Paul became Green Party leader in 2020, winning the Green Party of Canada leadership election to replace Elizabeth May. Running in the 2020 Toronto Centre federal by-election, Paul was defeated by Liberal nominee Marci Ien, again in 2021, which made her the only federal party leader who was not an MP, but whose party had representation in the Canadian House of Commons.

Leading up to the 2021 federal election, Paul's leadership was dogged by party infighting brought on by senior advisor Noah Zatzman and his controversial statement in the wake of evictions in Sheikh Jarrah. In the 2021 Canadian federal election, the Greens under Paul maintained two seats, and Paul finished fourth in the Toronto Centre district. On September 27, 2021, Paul began the process of resignation as party leader, and she ceased being party leader by November 14.

== Background ==
Paul started her involvement with politics early, working as a page in the Ontario Legislature at age 12, and later as a page at the Canadian Senate, and as a non-partisan Ontario Legislature intern with the Ontario Legislature Internship Programme (OLIP), she was placed in a Progressive Conservative and later Liberal office in 1996. She attended high school at Toronto's Runnymede Collegiate Institute and holds a Bachelor of Laws degree from the University of Ottawa and a Master of Public Affairs degree from Princeton University. She was called to the bar in Ontario in 1998.

Paul is the older sister of Canadian actress Ngozi Paul, twin sister to Luther, and is married to international human rights lawyer Mark Freeman. They have two sons. Her mother is from Nevis and her father from Dominica. Her father died in a long-term care home from a bladder infection on May 29, 2020. Paul converted to Judaism, the faith of her husband, in 2000. She speaks English, French, Catalan and Spanish.

== Civic engagement ==
In 2001, Paul started the Canadian Centre for Political Leadership (CCPL), whose work was supported by a fellowship from the Echoing Green Foundation and support from the Maytree Foundation. The CCPL was an organization focused on helping women, Indigenous persons, and people of colour to pursue public offices. Through the CCPL, Paul ran training sessions across Canada, as well as conferences devoted to participation in elected roles and board appointments. Participants in the CCPL's programs went on to achieve those objectives, being appointed and elected to boards and political staff positions.

In 2017, Paul co-founded the Barcelona International Public Policy Hub (BIPP HUB), a social enterprise co-work space designed to be a catalyst for international NGOs working on global challenges. Aside from providing support, the hub also hosts individual projects including democracia Abierta, the Spanish language branch of OpenDemocracy, Verificat, a Catalan language news fact-checking service, and the Climate Infrastructure Project.

In 2019, Paul co-created the 1834 Fellowship to train young Black Canadian policy leaders, a project of Operation Black Vote Canada.

== Early political career (1996–2020) ==
Paul interned for Liberal MPP Dominic Agostino in 1996, who served as Gerard Kennedy's leadership campaign co-chair. She stated she interned for him to see what a leadership campaign looked like.

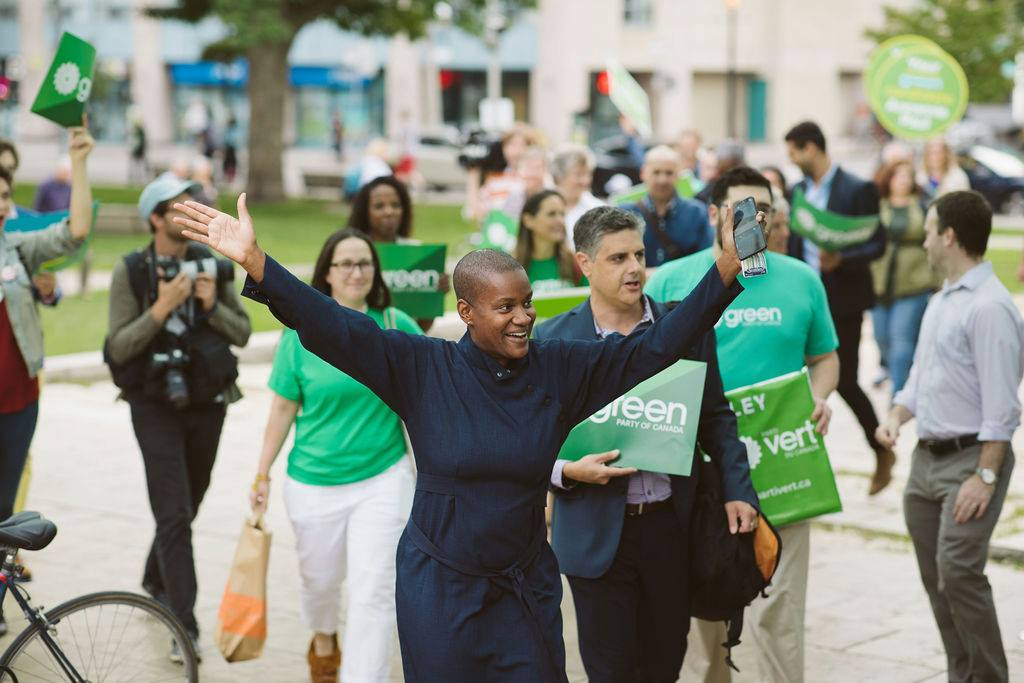
Paul with Green Party supporters, several weeks prior to the 2019 Canadian federal election

Paul moved back to Canada from Barcelona in 2019 and won the Green nomination for Toronto Centre in July 2019. She stood in the 2019 federal election as the Green Party candidate in Toronto Centre, where she lost to then-Finance Minister Bill Morneau. Soon after her nomination, she was appointed to the Green Party's Shadow Cabinet as International Affairs Critic by Elizabeth May, a position she held until February 2020, when she stepped down to enter the leadership race.

In March 2020, she was the first candidate registered to run in the race to be the 9th leader of the Green Party of Canada. She called the leadership race, the first one since 2006, an "opportunity for renewal" for the party. Elizabeth May offered to step aside to allow Paul to run in Saanich—Gulf Islands. On September 24, 2020, Paul announced that she had received permission from the Green Party to apply to be a candidate in the October 2020 federal by-election in Toronto Centre.

== Leadership of the Green Party of Canada (2020–2021) ==
On October 3, 2020, Paul was elected leader of the Green Party of Canada, becoming the first Black Canadian and first Jewish woman to be elected leader of a major political party in Canada. She won 54.53 per cent of votes on the final round of voting, defeating runner-up Dimitri Lascaris and six other candidates. Paul has been described as a centrist.

On October 26, Paul placed second in the Toronto Centre by-election, increasing her proportion of the vote by just over 25 per cent from the 2019 race. In January 2021, it was reported that Paul had decided to run in an Ontario riding during the next federal election, and was considering Guelph or a Toronto electoral district. About two weeks later, it was confirmed that Paul intended to run again in Toronto Centre.

=== Zatzman statement and following turmoil ===
In May 2021, the Party website published a statement calling for de-escalation of violence in the 2021 Israel–Palestine crisis and a return to dialogue; it quoted Paul as urging restraint and calling on those in authority to try to prevent further injury or loss of life. Several members of the party felt this statement didn't go far enough, quoting the official Party policy on the Israeli–Palestinian conflict expecting MPs to oppose illegal settlements and the siege of Gaza. Paul's senior advisor Noah Zatzman called the statements of several MPs including new MP Jenica Atwin antisemitic, indicating they were targeted due to Paul's Jewish faith, and made a controversial statement, which included a commitment to bring more pro-Israel Zionists into the party.

The statement led to a split within the party, with several members calling for Paul to denounce Zatzman's statement. Paul instead described the situation as a "difference of opinion", and also called for "solidarity to condemn anti-Semitism", and noted that she did not believe MPs were antisemitic.

Atwin subsequently crossed the floor and joined the Liberal Party on June 10, citing lack of support from Paul's leadership after Zatzman's threat. The remaining Green Party MPs, Elizabeth May and Paul Manly, issued a statement noting "unfortunately, the attack against Ms. Atwin by the Green Party leader's chief spokesperson on May 14th created the conditions that led to this crisis." Zatzman was fired on June 4, and the event led to an internal political struggle within the party, with the Green Party of Quebec citing difficulties.

==== Federal council response ====
By June 15, the Green Party had launched a motion of no confidence in Paul. The federal council passed a motion requiring Paul to denounce Zatzman and support the federal caucus, under threat of a vote of non-confidence on July 20. Paul claimed later in June that the federal council had decided to call off the vote, but in a Party town hall on June 30, interim president Liana Cusmano suggested that this was not the case. In the surrounding turmoil within the party, the interim executive director decided to review Paul's party membership. In the surrounding events, the Party filed an application with the Ontario Superior Court on July 21, arguing that an arbitrator exceeded authority in setting aside a non-confidence vote and membership review because Paul's contract was not with the Party's federal council, but with the Green Party of Canada Fund.

In response to the bid to oust her as party leader, Paul publicly criticized a letter that was written by several councillors and presented at the June 15 council meeting that initially discussed the non-confidence vote. She stated the letter as including a "list of allegations: allegations that were so racist, so sexist that they were immediately disavowed by both of our MPs as offensive and inflammatory and contrary to party ethics, and I thank our MPs for that". Paul further characterized Justin Trudeau as being a "faux-feminist" for opportunistically "undermining" her leadership, whilst accusing Chrystia Freeland of being a "female shield" to the Prime Minister.

=== Candidate nomination issues ===
In June 2021, Judy N. Green, co-president of the Green Party of Nova Scotia and 2020 Green Party leadership candidate, stated that a decision was made by Paul and her chief of staff to block Party members in the West Nova federal riding from considering Green for nomination in the upcoming federal election; Green was previously nominated as the West Nova candidate in 2019. On June 19, Lisa Gunderson withdrew from the party nomination contest for the Esquimalt—Saanich—Sooke federal riding, stating that "recent events [were] not consistent with Green values."

=== Resignation and departure from the Green Party ===
Paul announced her pending resignation as Green party leader on September 27, 2021. As Paul's resignation had not taken effect due to prolonged negotiations on a settlement of outstanding financial issues, an automatic leadership vote of all party members commenced in October and was to conclude on November 25, 2021. On November 10, 2021, as voting in the review was ongoing, Paul officially submitted her resignation and also ended her membership within the party. Her resignation as leader took effect on November 14, 2021, when it was officially accepted by the party's federal council.

In late November 2021, the party released a report indicating that it was threatened with insolvency, and was considering closing its office in Ottawa. The party had lost 499 monthly donors since July 2021, and 6,259 members in the same time. The report blamed negotiations concerning Paul's departure as leader of the party for significant legal costs.

== Post-political career (2021–present) ==
Following her departure from the Green Party, Paul returned to work in international affairs and climate policy. By 2024, she was working as a climate and sustainability adviser, including for the Institute for Integrated Transitions, an organization involved in conflict resolution and political transitions.

== Awards and fellowships ==
Paul is an Action Canada Fellow, Echoing Green Fellow, member of the University of Ottawa Common Law Honour Society, alumna of the Government of Canada Recruitment of Policy Leaders Program, and a recipient of the Harry Jerome Award.

== Electoral record ==
2021 Canadian federal election: Toronto Centre
Party	Candidate	Votes	%	±%	Expenditures
Liberal	Marci Ien	23,071	50.35	+8.35	$108,727.70
New Democratic	Brian Chang	11,909	25.99	+8.99	$58,981.25
Conservative	Ryan Lester	5,571	12.16	+6.46	$10,494.07
Green	Annamie Paul	3,921	8.56	–24.14	$93,340.55
People's	Syed Jaffrey	1,047	2.29	–1.19	$0.00
Communist	Ivan Byard	181	0.40	–	$0.00
Animal Protection	Peter Stubbins	117	0.25	–	$4,744.99
Total valid votes/expense limit		45,817	100.00	–	$110,776.83
Total rejected ballots		366	0.79	+0.29	
Turnout		46,183	57.42	+26.52	
Eligible voters		80,430			
Liberal hold		Swing		–0.32	
Source: Elections Canada

Canadian federal by-election, October 26, 2020: Toronto Centre Resignation of Bill Morneau
Party	Candidate	Votes	%	±%	Expenditures
Liberal	Marci Ien	10,581	42.0	-15.4	$116,839
Green	Annamie Paul	8,250	32.7	+25.6	$100,008
New Democratic	Brian Chang	4,280	17.0	-5.3	$71,222
Conservative	Benjamin Gauri Sharma	1,435	5.7	-6.4	$0
People's	Baljit Bawa	269	1.1	–	$22,752
Libertarian	Keith Komar	135	0.5	–	
Independent	Kevin Clarke	123	0.5	–	
Free	Dwayne Cappelletti	76	0.3	–	$1,570
No affiliation	Above Znoneofthe	56	0.2	–	$0
Total valid votes		25,205	100.0	–	
Total rejected ballots		118	0.5	-0.2	
Turnout		25,323	30.9	-35.2	
Electors on lists		81,861			
Liberal hold		Swing		-20.5	
Elections Canada

2020 Green Party of Canada leadership election results by round
Candidate	1st round		2nd round		3rd round		4th round		5th round		6th round		7th round		8th round	
Candidate	Votes cast	%	Votes cast	%	Votes cast	%	Votes cast	%	Votes cast	%	Votes cast	%	Votes cast	%	Votes cast	%
Annamie Paul	6,242	26.14%	6,242	26.16%	6,305	26.24%	6,478	27.23%	6,952	29.44%	7,614	32.52%	8,862	38.52%	12,090	54.53%
Dimitri Lascaris	5,768	24.15%	5,773	24.20%	5,813	24.40%	6,586	27.69%	7,050	29.86%	7,551	32.25%	8,340	36.22%	10,081	45.47%
Courtney Howard	3,285	13.76%	3,285	13.77%	3,348	14.05%	3,404	14.31%	3,762	15.93%	4,523	19.32%	5,824	25.29%	Eliminated	
Glen Murray	2,745	11.50%	2,746	11.51%	2,821	11.84%	2,846	11.96%	2,992	12.67%	3,725	15.91%	Eliminated			
David Merner	2,636	11.04%	2,636	11.05%	2,697	11.32%	2,727	11.46%	2,856	12.10%	Eliminated					
Amita Kuttner	1,468	6.15%	1,470	6.16%	1,486	6.24%	1,748	7.35%	Eliminated							
Meryam Haddad	1,345	5.63%	1,346	5.64%	1,358	5.70%	Eliminated									
Andrew West	352	1.47%	356	1.49%	Eliminated											
None Of The Above	36	0.15%	Eliminated													
Total	23,877	100%	23,854	100%	23,828	100%	23,788	100%	23,612	100%	23,413	100%	23,026	100%	22,171	100%

2019 Canadian federal election: Toronto Centre
Party	Candidate	Votes	%	±%	Expenditures
Liberal	Bill Morneau	31,271	57.37	−0.53	$95,538.84
New Democratic	Brian Chang	12,142	22.27	−4.34	$58,656.81
Conservative	Ryan Lester	6,613	12.13	−0.06	$39,309.94
Green	Annamie Paul	3,852	7.07	+4.47	$34,903.20
Animal Protection	Rob Lewin	182	0.33	–	$2,171.71
Rhinoceros	Sean Carson	147	0.27	–	–
Independent	Jason Tavares	126	0.23	–	–
Communist	Bronwyn Cragg	125	0.23	−0.03	$626.58
Marxist–Leninist	Philip Fernandez	54	0.10	−0.05	–
Total valid votes/expense limit		54,512	99.30	–	$107,308.65
Total rejected ballots		384	0.70	+0.18	
Turnout		54,896	66.08	−3.27	
Eligible voters		83,076			
Liberal hold		Swing		+1.90	
Source: Elections Canada
