= Exempt market securities =

Exempt market securities are securities issued in Canada that fall under National Instrument 45-106. They are exempt from prospectus requirements and hence require less disclosure than a prospectus offering. To sell a security in the exempt market, an issuer must ensure that the investor qualifies under a specific exemption contained in the Instrument. Common exemptions include:

- issue an offering memorandum
- sell only to accredited investors;
- sell only to family, friends and business associates;
- or sell a minimum of $150,000 per transaction.

Exempt market securities may involve a higher level of risk. There are no established secondary markets for exempt market securities and they are illiquid. Notably, unlike publicly traded companies, issuers of exempt market securities are not required to provide continuous disclosure to investors. Exempt market securities may be sold by an Exempt Market Dealer or Investment Dealer, or, in certain provinces, directly by an issuer under the North-Western Order, which is an exemption from registration requirements, with some conditions.
