= The Funding Portal =

The Funding Portal Inc. (Fundingportal) was a privately owned Canadian corporation that offered services and software solutions for grants and incentives management processes for applicants, funders, and advisors. It was the creator of Fundsearch, a database of 21,000 sources of government funding and private capital for businesses, universities, hospitals, charities, and nonprofits in Canada, the United States, and the United Kingdom. Government grants, incentives, and tax credits aggregated in its Canadian Fundsearch database disbursed approximately $30 billion in funding on an annual basis. In 2015, it reported attracting 17,000 users per month.

== History ==
Fundingportal was founded July 11, 2011, by Canadian lawyer Terry Kirk, CEO. The company raised financing from private and angel investors. At that time, it launched its Fundsearch database of what was then 7,000 government funding programs and sources of capital. The capital markets section of the search engine, which now includes more than 3,500 queryable sources of financing, including bank, angel, venture capital, and private funders, launched in 2012.

In April 2012, the Canadian branch of KPMG became a partner of Fundingportal to broaden its offerings to tax incentive clients. The company later entered into license agreements with 19 organizations, including Canadian Manufacturers & Exporters, MaRS Discovery District, the Mississauga Board of Trade, BIOTECanada, the National Angel Capital Organization, TECHNATION Canada, and the Canadian Network of Asset Managers (CNAM).

In May 2014, Fundingportal was registered by Canadian regulatory authorities as an Exempt Market Dealer portal able to assist companies into both sources of government funding and capital markets.

In May 2016, Fundingportal's CEO, Terry Kirk, was presented the EY Sara Kirke Award for Entrepreneurship and Innovation.

In 2018, Fundingportal announced the launch of its new suite of AI-powered Incentives Management Tools. The cloud-based SaaS solution now includes 12 tools available to enterprise license holders.

In April 2020, Fundingportal named Alexandria J. Shannon as VP, Business Development & Partnerships. Three months later, in July 2020, Alexandria was announced as the new President of Fundingportal.

Fundingportal was acquired by Ryan LLC in 2022.

== Services ==
In addition to Fundsearch, which employed AI to match businesses with investors and to keep fund and disbursement data up-to-date, Fundingportal also offered big data reports and grant writing services. Its software solutions included the Fundsuite Grants Management System (GMS) for funders and the Fundsuite Incentives Management System for applicants and advisors.
