= Directors Guild of Canada =

Trade union

- Abbreviation: DGC
- Formation: 1962
- Type: Trade union
- Headquarters: Toronto, Ontario, Canada
- Location: Canada
- Members: 5,500
- Official languages: English; French
- President: Warren P. Sonoda
- Affiliations: Canadian Labour Congress
- Website: dgc.ca

The Directors Guild of Canada (DGC; French: Guilde canadienne des réalisateurs) is a Canadian labour union representing more than 5,500 professionals from 48 different occupations in the Canadian film and television industry. Founded in 1962, the DGC represents directors, editors, assistant directors, location managers, production assistants and others.

The DGC has district councils in the following provinces; British Columbia, Alberta, Saskatchewan, Manitoba, Ontario, Quebec, Newfoundland and Labrador and the Atlantic District Council (representing New Brunswick, Nova Scotia and Prince Edward Island). However, in Quebec certain positions are represented by other unions such as IATSE 514 and the Quebec union "AQTIS". Each district council has written its own specific Standard Agreement to represent its members.

The National Office for the Directors Guild of Canada is located on Heward Street, Toronto, Ontario.

== Awards ==
The Directors Guild of Canada hosts an annual awards ceremony recognizing achievement in directing, production design, picture and sound editing for the following categories as well as others

- Outstanding Directorial Achievement in a Feature Film
- Outstanding Directorial Achievement in a Family Series
- DGC Allan King Award for Best Documentary Film
- DGC Award for Best Short Film
- Jean-Marc Vallée DGC Discovery Award for emerging filmmakers

== HAVEN Helpline ==
On 1 June 2019, ACTRA and the Directors Guild of Canada jointly launched HAVEN Helpline for members in Canada, with 24-7 support, out-sourced from Morneau Shepell, with additional financial support from AFBS and Telefilm Canada.
