= CNAM =

CNAM may refer to:

- Calling Name Presentation, a Caller ID service
- Canadian Network of Asset Managers, for municipal assets
- Coimisiún na Meán, Irish media, broadcasting, and internet regulator
- Conservatoire national des arts et métiers (National Conservatory of Arts and Crafts), a French research and education institution
