= Marci Ien =

Canadian politician and journalist

The Honourable Marci Ien PC
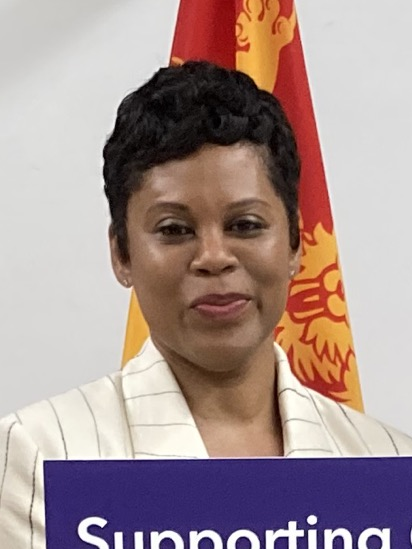
- Ien in 2023

Minister for Women and Gender Equality and Youth
- In office October 26, 2021 – March 14, 2025
- Prime Minister: Justin Trudeau
- Preceded by: Maryam Monsef (Women and Gender Equality); Bardish Chagger (Youth)
- Succeeded by: Rechie Valdez

Member of Parliament for Toronto Centre
- In office October 26, 2020 – March 23, 2025
- Preceded by: Bill Morneau
- Succeeded by: Evan Solomon

Personal details
- Born: July 29, 1969 (age 57) Toronto, Ontario, Canada
- Party: Liberal
- Education: Ryerson Polytechnical Institute (BA)
- Occupation: Journalist, television host
- Known for: Former co-host of The Social, former news anchor for Canada AM

Marci Ien PC (born 1969) is a Canadian politician and former broadcaster who served as minister for women and gender equality and youth from 2021 to 2025. A member of the Liberal Party, Ien represented Toronto Centre in the House of Commons from 2020 to 2025. Previously, she was a broadcast journalist for CTV. She co-hosted the CTV daytime talk show The Social from 2017 until 2020. Previously, she was a reporter for CTV News and a co-anchor on the CTV morning program Canada AM. As a child, she appeared regularly on the Christian children's show Circle Square.

== Background ==
Marci Ien is a Black Canadian of Trinidadian descent. Her father, Joel Ien, had come to Canada in the late 1960s to attend university and went on to a career in education as a teacher, principal, and school superintendent in Toronto. Ien was born in Toronto's St. James Town neighbourhood and grew up in Scarborough, going on to attend Stephen Leacock Collegiate Institute and Agincourt Collegiate Institute. Ien appeared regularly on the Crossroads Christian Communications program Circle Square.

Ien lives in Toronto with her two children, an adult daughter and a teen son. Her 2020 book Off Script: Living Out Loud chronicles her life growing up in Toronto, working as a journalist, and deciding to enter politics.

== Journalism ==
Ien graduated with a degree in radio and television arts from Ryerson Polytechnical Institute in 1991. She began her career at CHCH-TV in Hamilton, Ontario in 1991 as a news writer and general assignment reporter. In 1995 she began reporting from Queen's Park in Toronto, with her reports appearing both on CHCH's local news and on WIC's national newscast Canada Tonight.

In 1997 Ien moved to CTV as a reporter for CTV Atlantic, covering major stories including the crash of Swissair Flight 111 off Peggy's Cove, Nova Scotia, before returning to Toronto in 1998 to anchor CTV Newsnet, as CTV's all-news channel was then called,. From 2003, Ien also anchored the nationwide Canada AM morning broadcast show, which she co-hosted from 2011 until the show's cancellation in 2016. Ien returned to Atlantic Canada to participate in the Halifax leg of the 2010 Winter Olympics torch relay.

Following Canada AM, Ien was a guest and then permanent host of The Social (2016-2020) until her move to politics.

=== Awards ===
In 1995, Ien won a Radio Television Digital News Association Award for her news serial Journey to Freedom, a look at the Underground Railroad. In 2008, she was the recipient of a Black Business and Professional Association Harry Jerome Award in the media category. In 2014, she was granted the Planet Africa Award for excellence in media. In 2015, Ien garnered a Canadian Screen Award nomination in the Best Host category for her work on Canada AM. In 2016, she was honoured with an African Canadian Achievement Award for her journalistic achievements.

== Politics ==
On September 17, 2020, Ien was announced as the Liberal Party of Canada's candidate in Toronto Centre for a by-election to fill the seat vacated by former Finance Minister Bill Morneau's resignation. She won the by-election on October 26, 2020, defeating Green Party of Canada leader Annamie Paul.

Ien was re-elected on September 20, 2021, with increased support and appointed to Cabinet as Minister for Women, Gender Equality and Youth on October 26, 2021.

Ien announced on March 7, 2025, that she would not be a candidate in the 2025 Canadian federal election.

== Electoral record ==
2021 Canadian federal election: Toronto Centre
| Party | Candidate | Votes | % | ±% | Expenditures |
|---|---|---|---|---|---|
| Liberal | Marci Ien | 23,071 | 50.35 | +8.35 | $108,727.70 |
| New Democratic | Brian Chang | 11,909 | 25.99 | +8.99 | $58,981.25 |
| Conservative | Ryan Lester | 5,571 | 12.16 | +6.46 | $10,494.07 |
| Green | Annamie Paul | 3,921 | 8.56 | –24.14 | $93,340.55 |
| People's | Syed Jaffrey | 1,047 | 2.29 | –1.19 | $0.00 |
| Communist | Ivan Byard | 181 | 0.40 | – | $0.00 |
| Animal Protection | Peter Stubbins | 117 | 0.25 | – | $4,744.99 |
| Total valid votes/expense limit | | 45,817 | 100.00 | – | $110,776.83 |
| Total rejected ballots | | 366 | 0.79 | +0.29 | |
| Turnout | | 46,183 | 57.42 | +26.52 | |
| Eligible voters | | 80,430 | | | |
| Liberal hold | | Swing | | –0.32 | |
Source: Elections Canada

Canadian federal by-election, October 26, 2020: Toronto Centre Resignation of Bill Morneau
| Party | Candidate | Votes | % | ±% | Expenditures |
|---|---|---|---|---|---|
| Liberal | Marci Ien | 10,581 | 42.0 | -15.4 | $116,839 |
| Green | Annamie Paul | 8,250 | 32.7 | +25.6 | $100,008 |
| New Democratic | Brian Chang | 4,280 | 17.0 | -5.3 | $71,222 |
| Conservative | Benjamin Gauri Sharma | 1,435 | 5.7 | -6.4 | $0 |
| People's | Baljit Bawa | 269 | 1.1 | – | $22,752 |
| Libertarian | Keith Komar | 135 | 0.5 | – | |
| Independent | Kevin Clarke | 123 | 0.5 | – | |
| Free | Dwayne Cappelletti | 76 | 0.3 | – | $1,570 |
| No affiliation | Above Znoneofthe | 56 | 0.2 | – | $0 |
| Total valid votes | | 25,205 | 100.0 | – | |
| Total rejected ballots | | 118 | 0.5 | -0.2 | |
| Turnout | | 25,323 | 30.9 | -35.2 | |
| Electors on lists | | 81,861 | | | |
| Liberal hold | | Swing | | -20.5 | |
Elections Canada
