= Federal aid during the COVID-19 pandemic in Canada =

National economic response to the COVID-19 pandemic

COVID-19 Emergency Response Act

Parliament of Canada
- Long title: An Act respecting certain measures in response to COVID-19
- Citation: S.C. 2020, c. 5
- Enacted by: Parliament of Canada
- Royal assent: March 25, 2020
- Status: Current legislation

The Government of Canada introduced multiple temporary social security and financial aid programs in response to the economic impacts of the COVID-19 pandemic in Canada. The initial CA$82-billion aid package was announced on March 18, 2020 by Justin Trudeau.

The first measures were implemented when the COVID-19 Emergency Response Act received royal assent from Governor General Julie Payette on March 25, 2020.

== Modifications to existing programs ==
Existing federal social security programs were modified to provide additional financial support to their recipients. Canada Child Benefit payments were given a one-time increase of $300 per child, the Goods and Services Tax (GST) credit for the 2019 tax year was doubled, and personal income tax deadlines for 2019 were extended.

Catherine McKenna, the Minister of Infrastructure and Communities, also announced on April 16 that the federal government was seeking "shovel-ready" infrastructure projects to receive stimulus funding.

== Income support programs ==
=== CERB (March – September 2020) ===
The Canada Emergency Response Benefit (CERB; French: Prestation canadienne d'urgence) was a program that provided a taxable benefit of CA$2,000per month for Canadian residents facing unemployment due to the COVID-19 pandemic.

Initially announced as providing a maximum of four months' financial support, the federal government announced a further two months of support in June 2020 and another month in August 2020. The benefit is jointly administered by Employment and Social Development Canada (ESDC) and the Canada Revenue Agency (CRA), with eligible persons either applying through ESDC's Service Canada online portal or through the CRA online portal. To be eligible, applicants must attest they: did not quit their job voluntarily, earned at least CA$5,000 in the 2019 tax year or the preceding 12 months, have stopped working or are working reduced hours due to COVID-19, and are earning less than CA$1,000 in employment or self-employment income.

Within one week of the CERB program's launch in April 2020, nearly 3.5 million Canadians applied for this benefit; this grew to 7.12 million by April 24. On April 15, eligibility for CERB was expanded to include seasonal workers, persons who had exhausted their Employment Insurance (EI) regular or sickness benefits, and those who have returned to work but still earn less than CA$1,000 per month due to reduced hours or lower demand.

Employment minister Carla Qualtrough announced on July 31, 2020 that the CERB would be wound down following a final extension of one month. CERB recipients who are still unemployed will be transitioned to the regular EI system and those who do not qualify for EI will be transitioned into one of three new recovery benefit programs. CERB was ended on September 26, 2020, and a revamped EI program was implemented. Approximately 8.9 million Canadians applied for CERB by its end date. In 2022 the Auditor General of Canada, Karen Hogan, conducted a review into the CERB fund and concluded that "the federal government effectively delivered emergency COVID-19 benefits during the pandemic" but that "deciding to not front-end verification resulted in $4.6 billion in overpayments to ineligible individuals." There are reports of mismanagement, fraud and a number of scams related to CERB.

==== CERB repayment ====
In late 2020, the CRA sent out 441,000 letters asking for full or partial repayment of the CERB to Canadians, due to ineligibility. These individuals were urged to repay the benefit by December 31, 2020, to avoid tax issues. Confusion on eligibility arose from language used to describe who could receive the CERB with the requirement being $5,000 in net income vs. $5,000 gross income. The CRA later admitted the semantics were 'unclear'.

=== CESB (May – August 2020) ===
Due to the lack of summer employment available for post-secondary students or graduating high school students, the Canadian government introduced the Canada Emergency Student Benefit (CESB; French: Prestation canadienne d'urgence pour les étudiants) as a counterpart to CERB to help students. Students who cannot find employment or are unable to work due to the COVID-19 pandemic are eligible for CA$1,250 per month from May through August 2020. CESB applicants with a disability or caring for dependents receive an additional $750, increasing their monthly amount to the equivalent of a CERB payment.

=== Recovery Benefits (September 2020 – October 2021) ===
==== CRB ====
On October 12, 2020, the federal government rolled out a new income support program, the Canada Recovery Benefit (CRB), designed to support those who do not normally qualify for EI (for example, the self-employed). The benefit paid a pre-taxed (at 10%) $500 per week for up to 38 weeks; over 240,000 Canadians applied to the program on its first day of launching. To be eligible Canadians must have been unemployed or have had a 50% reduction in average weekly income compared to the previous year due to COVID-19. If a participant made more than $38,000 annual salary, $0.50 of every dollar earned on the CRB would have to be paid back if the participant was still taking it.

The CRB was available for eligible individuals for an allocated amount of time between September 27, 2020 and September 25, 2021. Individuals who have travelled internationally were not eligible to receive the benefit for any period where they were not working due to mandatory quarantine requirements.

In March 2021, the government extended the CRB benefit to 50 weeks (25 periods). The first 42 weeks (21 periods) provided $1000 ($900 pre-taxed) every two-week period, and the final eight weeks (four periods) provided $600 ($540 pre-taxed). The program was scheduled to end on September 25, 2021. In August 2021, the government extended the program again to 54 weeks (27 periods) in October 2021.

==== CRSB ====
The Canada Recovery Sickness Benefit (CRSB) provides $500 per week (2 weeks maximum) for workers who: (a) "are unable to work for at least 50% of the week because they contracted COVID-19;" (b) "are self-isolated for reasons related to COVID-19;" or (c) "have underlying conditions, are undergoing treatments or have contracted other sicknesses that, in the opinion of a medical practitioner, nurse practitioner, person in authority, government or public health authority, would make them more susceptible to COVID-19." Individuals who have travelled internationally are not eligible to receive the benefit for any period where they are not working due to mandatory quarantine requirements.

==== CRCB ====
Another program, the Canada Recovery Caregiving Benefit (CRCB) supports Canadians that have been working but have to take a break to care for dependents (a child below 12 years of age or a disabled family member). The benefit only applies if schools and care centres are closed, or the dependent fell sick, or contracted COVID-19. Individuals who have travelled internationally are not eligible to receive the benefit for any period where they are not working due to mandatory quarantine requirements.

=== Worker lockdown benefits (October 2021 – May 2022) ===
In October 2021, the federal government created the Canada Worker Lockdown Benefit (CWLB). The programs planned to provide 300 dollars per month for workers who cannot work because their workplace faced a local lockdown. The program is set to run from 24 October 2021 to 7 May 2022. The program was expanded on 22 December to also cover workplaces whose capacity was reduced by 50% due to provincial restrictions. However, these workers were required to prove that they also lost at least 50% of their revenue because of these measures. The program closed for applications on 18 May 2022.

== Employer/business support ==
=== Canada Emergency Business Account ===
The Canada Emergency Business Account (CEBA; French: Compte d'urgence pour les entreprises canadiennes) provides emergency interest-free loans to small businesses and nonprofit organizations during the COVID-19 pandemic. The aim of this program is to ensure that these businesses have access to sufficient capital to remain solvent during the pandemic. CEBA was implemented in the COVID-19 Emergency Response Act, No. 2 which was introduced by Finance Minister Bill Morneau and passed in Parliament on April 11, 2020.

The budget for the program was set for CA$25 billion, offering loans of CA$40,000 financed by Export Development Canada. Businesses apply for CEBA loans through their current financial institution, which administer the loan and submit required information to EDC. Businesses that repay at least 75% of the loan balance (CA$30,000) by December 31, 2022 will have any remaining balance forgiven. The size of the loans could be increased, along with the amount forgivable. The due date could also be moved into 2024 if need be.

In November 2023, Ottawa accountant Moe Tabesh initiated a petition with over 17,000 signatures to urge the Canadian government to forgive pandemic loans from the Canada Emergency Business Account (CEBA), reflecting the financial hardships of nearly 900,000 other small businesses and non-profits. The move underscored the widespread difficulty in repaying the $49 billion distributed, as many businesses continued grappling with post-pandemic economic challenges.

=== Canada Emergency Wage Subsidy ===
The Canada Emergency Wage Subsidy (CEWS; French: Subvention salariale d'urgence du Canada) is a program created by the Government of Canada to provide financial support for businesses during the COVID-19 pandemic and prevent large layoffs. CEWS allows eligible employers to receive a 75% subsidy on each of their employees' wages (up to their first $58,700) for 12 weeks retroactive to March 15. The CEWS is targeted "at businesses with revenue declines of at least 15 per cent in March, and 30 per cent in May and June."

The program was announced on 1 April 2020, as an expanded version of a previously proposed temporary wage subsidy. The Parliament of Canada reconvened on 11 April 2020 to pass the COVID-19 Emergency Response Act, No. 2 on division. Several large employers which had laid off employees due to the economic effects of the pandemic announced they would re-hire workers in response to CEWS. Air Canada announced because of the CEWS it would rehire (backdated to 15 March) 16,000 airline staff that were laid off due to the pandemic.

=== Business Credit Availability Program ===
The Business Credit Availability Program (BCAP), which was announced on 11 May 2020, consists of guaranteed loans at commercial rates of between CA$6–80 million. It had seen as of mid-June 2020 only 400 applications. Administered by Export Development Canada and Business Development Canada, the program is the responsibility of the Minister of Small Business, Export Promotion and International Trade, Mary Ng.

The program is available at various banks and credit unions until June 2021.

=== Canada Emergency Rent Subsidy ===
The Canada Emergency Rent Subsidy (CERS) provides rent and mortgage support for qualifying businesses, non-profit organizations, or charities, affected by COVID-19.

Available from September 27, 2020 until June 2021, the subsidy helps qualifying organizations who have experienced a drop in revenue due to the pandemic, paying for part of their commercial rent or property expenses. CERS provides payments directly to renters and property owners, without requiring the participation of a landlord.

=== Large Employer Emergency Financing Facility ===
The Large Employer Emergency Financing Facility (LEEFF; French: Crédit d’urgence pour les grands employeurs) provides government-backed bridge financing to large Canadian employers through the Canada Enterprise Emergency Funding Corporation (CEEFC)—which was formed as a subsidiary of the Canada Development Investment Corporation (CDEV) specifically to administer the LEEFF.

On 11 May 2020, Trudeau, Morneau and Bains in a press conference said that "a bridge financing facility for large employers that need help to get through the economic downturn caused by the coronavirus." One stated goal was "to avoid bankruptcies of otherwise viable firms wherever possible... Companies that use the lending facility will have to commit to respect collective bargaining agreements, protecting workers’ pensions, and support national climate goals. Rules on access to the money will place limits on dividends, share buy-backs and executive pay." The LEEFF will only target companies with annual revenues in excess of $300 million, and only if they request $60 million or more from the LEEFF.

Under the LEEFF companies must also: limit executive salaries to $1 million per annum; provide a share in their business to CDEV through stock warrants; and prohibit dividends and share buybacks until they pay back their LEEFF.

=== Other support for businesses ===
- Black Entrepreneurship Loan Fund: This fund supports Black business owners/entrepreneurs with loans of between CA$25,000 and $250,000.
- Canada Summer Jobs (CJS): Through temporary changes to the CSJ program, the federal government agreed to create up to 120,000 job opportunities for students by (a) providing a wage subsidy for private and public-sector employers of up to 75% of the provincial/territorial minimum wage for each employee; (b) an extension to the end date for employment to February 26, 2022; and (c) allowing employers to hire staff on a part-time basis.
- Canada United Small Business Relief Fund (CUSBRF): This fund provides relief grants of up to $5,000 to small businesses, used for: purchasing PPE, renovating physical spaces, or developing their website or e-commerce capabilities.
- Indigenous business funding: Indigenous Services Canada are providing $306.8 million in funding to assist small to medium-sized Indigenous businesses, through Aboriginal Financial Institutions that offer financing to such businesses. The funding, administered by the National Aboriginal Capital Corporations Association, allows for short-term, interest-free loans and non-repayable contributions through Aboriginal Financial Institutions, which offer financing and business support services to First Nations, Inuit, and Métis businesses.
- Regional Relief and Recovery Fund (RRRF): Innovation, Science and Economic Development Canada is providing more than $1.5 billion through the RRRF to assist organizations in locally- and regionally-significant sectors as manufacturing, technology, tourism, etc. The fund specifically targets those that may need further help to recover from the pandemic, "but have been unable to access other support measures." The support provided by RRRF mirrors other federal programs like the Canada Emergency Business Account and the Business Credit Availability Program.
- Tariff relief: On 6 May 2020, the federal government waived tariffs on particular medical goods, including personal protective equipment (e.g., masks and gloves), in order to reduce the cost of imported PPE and maintain efficient supply-chain operations.
- Work-Sharing: The Government extended the maximum duration of the Work-Sharing program in order to provide income support to employees eligible for Employment Insurance who "agree to reduce their normal working hours because of developments beyond the control of their employers."

=== Sector-specific support ===
- Canadian Dairy Commission limit: The federal government increased the borrowing limit of Canadian Dairy Commission by $200 million in order to avoid food waste by supporting costs associated with the temporary storage of cheese and butter.
- Canada Healthy Communities Initiative
- Canada Research Continuity Emergency Fund (CRCEF): The program, announced on 15 May 2020, provides wage support for up to 75% of wages for individuals working in universities and health institutes, for a maximum of $847 per week per employee. The program is administered by the Social Sciences and Humanities Research Council (SSHRC) on behalf of itself, the Canadian Institutes of Health Research (CIHR), and the Natural Sciences and Engineering Research Council (NSERC).
- Canadian Seafood Stabilization Fund
- Farm Credit Canada lending: The federal government enabled Farm Credit Canada to provide an additional $5 billion in lending to producers, agribusinesses, and food processors.
- Gas Tax Fund: Infrastructure Canada, announced on 1 June 2020, allocates $2.2 billion to help Canadian communities.
- Investing in Canada Infrastructure Program
- Mandatory Isolation Support for Temporary Foreign Workers Program (MISTFWP): Agriculture and Agri-Food Canada provides support of $1,500 per each temporary foreign worker to employers or those working with them to ensure requirements are fully met.
- Short-Term Compensation Fund (STCF): The initiative was launched by Telefilm Canada on 28 October 2020 as a temporary measure to compensate independent production companies for interruptions in filming and the abandonment of productions caused by the pandemic, along with the lack of insurance coverage for such.

== Other aid ==
=== Proposed Canada Student Service Grant ===
The Canada Student Service Grant (CSSG; French: Bourse canadienne pour le bénévolat étudiants) was a proposed program to provide paid service opportunities for young adults (ages 30 and under) to assist with charities and non-profit organizations. Participation would be limited to recent post-secondary graduates (December 2019 or later) or students enrolled in spring, summer or fall 2020 semesters. Participants would receive $1000 per 100 hours of volunteer work, up to a maximum of $5000. The decision to contract administration of the program to WE Charity was controversial, leading to a political scandal and ultimately the cancellation of the program. 35,000 students and recent graduates had applied for the program.

=== One-time payment for people with disabilities ===
The Government of Canada gave a special one-time, tax-free non-reportable payment of $600 for people with disabilities on October 30. The money would be available for those who already possessed a valid Disability Tax Credit certificate, those receiving Canada Pension Disability or Quebec Disability Pension benefits, or those receiving disability support from Veterans Affairs Canada.

== Enforcement ==
On June 2, 2020, the Canada Revenue Agency announced a tip line for reporting suspected fraudulent CERB recipients. As of June 3, the CRA announced it had received 600 tips and had received 190,000 voluntary repayments of CERB from Canadians who were not entitled to receive them. On June 8, legislation was proposed by the Liberal government that would allow persons found to have received CERB payments fraudulently be subject to fines or imprisonment. The proposed legislation was not supported by any of the opposition parties in the minority Parliament and did not move ahead to second reading.

== Clawback and Repayment Controversy ==
In 2022, the CRA began a massive clawback of individual COVID-19 benefits, issuing hundreds of thousands of demand for repayment letters to Canadians. According to the CRA, "This ongoing process started by issuing initial contact letters to some benefits recipients to request documents to support their claims. The second step was to issue Notices of Redetermination to individuals who were deemed to be ineligible for a portion or all of their claim, or who did not respond to the initial contact letters.

In May 2022, the CRA began its collection approach by sending letters favouring voluntary payment. Then in February 2023, the CRA started issuing collection letters to individuals who had not made an effort to resolve their overpayment. The CRA also made several attempts to reach individuals by phone."

Anecdotal evidence suggested that the program was unpopular, with media reporting the clawback was "punishing" and "hurting" the poorest recipients, and that "repayments are hurting small businesses and many are going under."

== Financial impacts of aid programs ==
Parliamentary Budget Officer Yves Giroux issued a report on April 30, 2020 projecting the federal deficit for fiscal year 2020 could be in excess of $252 billion, based on nearly $146 billion in spending on federal aid measures. In a fiscal update tabled on July 8, Minister of Finance Bill Morneau projected that the deficit for the 2020 fiscal year will reach $343.2 billion.

Most federal aid during the COVID-19 pandemic came in the form of taxable benefits. As a consequence, some provincial governments (including Ontario and British Columbia) experienced a dramatic surge in revenue. This windfall has been referred to as a "secret provincial bailout" by some commentators.
