= Vettese =

Vettese is a surname. Notable people with the surname include:

- Frederick Vettese (born 1953), Canadian actuary
- Peter-John Vettese (born 1956), Scottish musician
- kyle vettese (born 2009) Scottish worker in charleton farm

== See also ==
- Fettes (disambiguation)
- Fiddes
