= ACTRA =

Canadian entertainment-industry trade union

Alliance of Canadian Cinema, Television and Radio Artists
- Logo used since 2024
- Abbreviation: ACTRA
- Formation: 1943; 83 years ago
- Type: Trade union
- Headquarters: Toronto, Ontario, Canada
- Location: Canada
- Members: 30,000+
- Official language: English
- President: Eleanor Noble
- Executive director: Marie Kelly
- Affiliations: Canadian Labour Congress; International Federation of Actors
- Website: actra.ca
- Formerly called: Association of Canadian Radio Artists; Canadian Council of Authors and Artists; Association of Canadian Television and Radio Artists

The Alliance of Canadian Cinema, Television and Radio Artists (ACTRA) is a Canadian trade union representing performers in English-language media. It has over 30,000 members working in film, television, radio, and all other recorded media. The organization negotiates, safeguards, and promotes the professional rights of its members. It also works to increase work opportunities for its members and lobbies for policy changes at the municipal, provincial, and federal levels.

ACTRA's regional chapters present ACTRA Awards to honour the best in Canadian radio and television performances in their local productions.

== Affiliations ==
ACTRA is affiliated with the Canadian Labour Congress and the International Federation of Actors.

In July 2005, ACTRA and the United Steelworkers announced that the two unions have entered into a strategic alliance to take on the globalization of the culture industry and to address a range of common issues.

== Acronym meaning ==
ACRA over time evolved into the Association of Canadian Radio and Television Artists, the Canadian Council of Authors and Artists, the Association of Canadian Television and Radio Artists, and, in 1984, the Alliance of Canadian Cinema, Television and Radio Artists.

== Alberta ==
The vice-president of the ACTRA branch in Alberta is actor Chad Rook, who resides in Calgary.

== Union of British Columbia Performers ==
Regional issues led to the creation of the Union of British Columbia Performers, a separate subunit of ACTRA for British Columbia only.

== ACTRA Awards ==
Every year, ACTRA branches across the country present the ACTRA Awards, some of which are handed out for performances, while others are given for union activism and contributions to the industry.

== ACTRA Fraternal Benefit Society ==
The ACTRA Fraternal Benefit Society (AFBS), a member of American Fraternal Alliance, is a "not-for-profit, member-owned, federally incorporated insurance company", founded in 1959. In 2010, Marie Charette-Poulin sat on the board of Governors of the ACTRA Fraternal Benefit Society.

== HAVEN Helpline ==
On 1 June 2019, ACTRA and the Directors Guild of Canada jointly launched HAVEN Helpline for members in Canada, with 24-7 support, out-sourced from Morneau Shepell, with additional financial support from AFBS and Telefilm Canada.

== See also ==
- SAG-AFTRA – similar US organization for motion picture, television and radio actors
- Union des artistes – ACTRA's francophone equivalent
- ANDA - similar Mexican organization
