= 2016 Canadian federal budget =

2016 Budget of the Canadian Federal Government
- Presented: 22 March 2016
- Country: Canada
- Parliament: 42nd
- Party: Liberal
- Finance minister: Bill Morneau
- Total revenue: 287.7 billion (Projected); 293.5 billion (Actual)
- Total expenditures: 317.1 billion (Projected); 312.5 billion (Actual)
- Deficit: 29.4 billion (Projected); 19.0 billion (Actual)
- Website: http://www.budget.gc.ca/2016/docs/plan/toc-tdm-en.html

The Canadian federal budget for fiscal year 2016–17 was presented to the House of Commons of Canada by Finance Minister Bill Morneau on 22 March 2016. The deficit was projected to be $29.4 billion for the fiscal year 2016–2017, however this was adjusted to $17.8 billion by end of March 2017. This was later adjusted to $19.0 billion after reflecting a change in the discount rate methodology used to determine the present value of the Government's unfunded pension obligations. The Auditor General's recommendations resulted in revisions to 10 years' worth of budget numbers. The budget also forecast that the deficit would shrink to $14.3 billion four years later.

Items of note in the budget included $120 billion over 10 years for public infrastructure—focusing on transit, water, waste management and housing—as well as the introduction of the Canada Child Benefit. The budget also included money for First Nations communities, as well as larger seniors and employment insurance benefits.
