= Fiddes =

Fiddes (/ˌfɪdɪs/ FID-iss) or Fiddess is a Scottish surname. Notable people with the surname include:

- Alex Fiddes (1914–1998), Scottish rugby union and rugby league footballer
- Beth Robertson Fiddes, Scottish artist
- Buster Fiddess (born Fiddes c. 1914–1972), Australian comedian
- Christopher Fiddes (born 1934), English artist
- Frank Fiddes (1906–1981), Canadian rower
- George Vandeleur Fiddes (1858–1936), British civil servant
- Jim Fiddes (1916–1970), Scottish footballer with Rangers and Falkirk
- Justin Fiddes (born 1996), American former soccer player
- Louise Fiddes (born 2001), British para swimmer
- Paul S. Fiddes (born 1947), English theologian and novelist
- Richard Fiddes (1671–1725), English minister and historian

== See also ==
- Fiddes Castle
- Fettes (disambiguation)
- Vettese
