= Frederick Vettese =

Canadian author (born 1953)

- Born: 1953 (age 72–73); Toronto, Ontario, Canada
- Occupations: Actuary, Author
- Spouses: Michelle Massie (m. 2014) Sharolyn Mathieu (m. 1983; div. 2012)
- Children: 3
- Writing career
- Notable works: The Real Retirement: Why You Could Be Better Off Than You Think, and How to Make That Happen

Frederick Vettese (born 1953) served as the chief actuary of Morneau Shepell until 2018 and is author of several books exploring Canada's retirement system.

Vettese is the author of The Essential Retirement Guide: A Contrarian's Perspective and has co-authored The Real Retirement: Why You Could Be Better Off Than You Think, and How to Make That Happen with Bill Morneau. In 2018, he published his third book, Retirement income For Life: Getting More without Saving More, with a second edition published in 2020.

He is a regular contributor to Canadian publications such as the Globe and Mail and the National Post and has appeared in several video interviews to discuss Canadian retirement strategies.

Vettese is a Fellow of the Canadian Institute of Actuaries (FCIA).
