= 2020 Toronto Centre federal by-election =

Canadian by-election

- October 26, 2020

Riding of Toronto Centre
- Turnout: 30.96% (▼35.12pp)
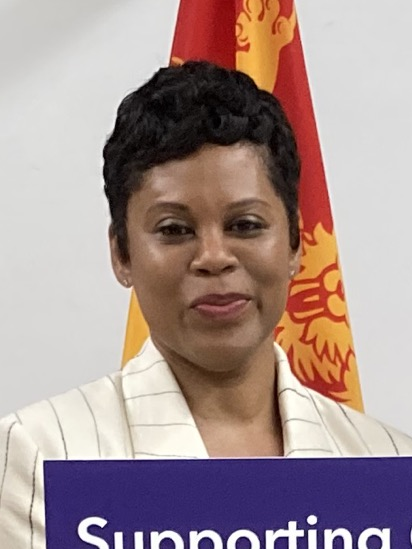

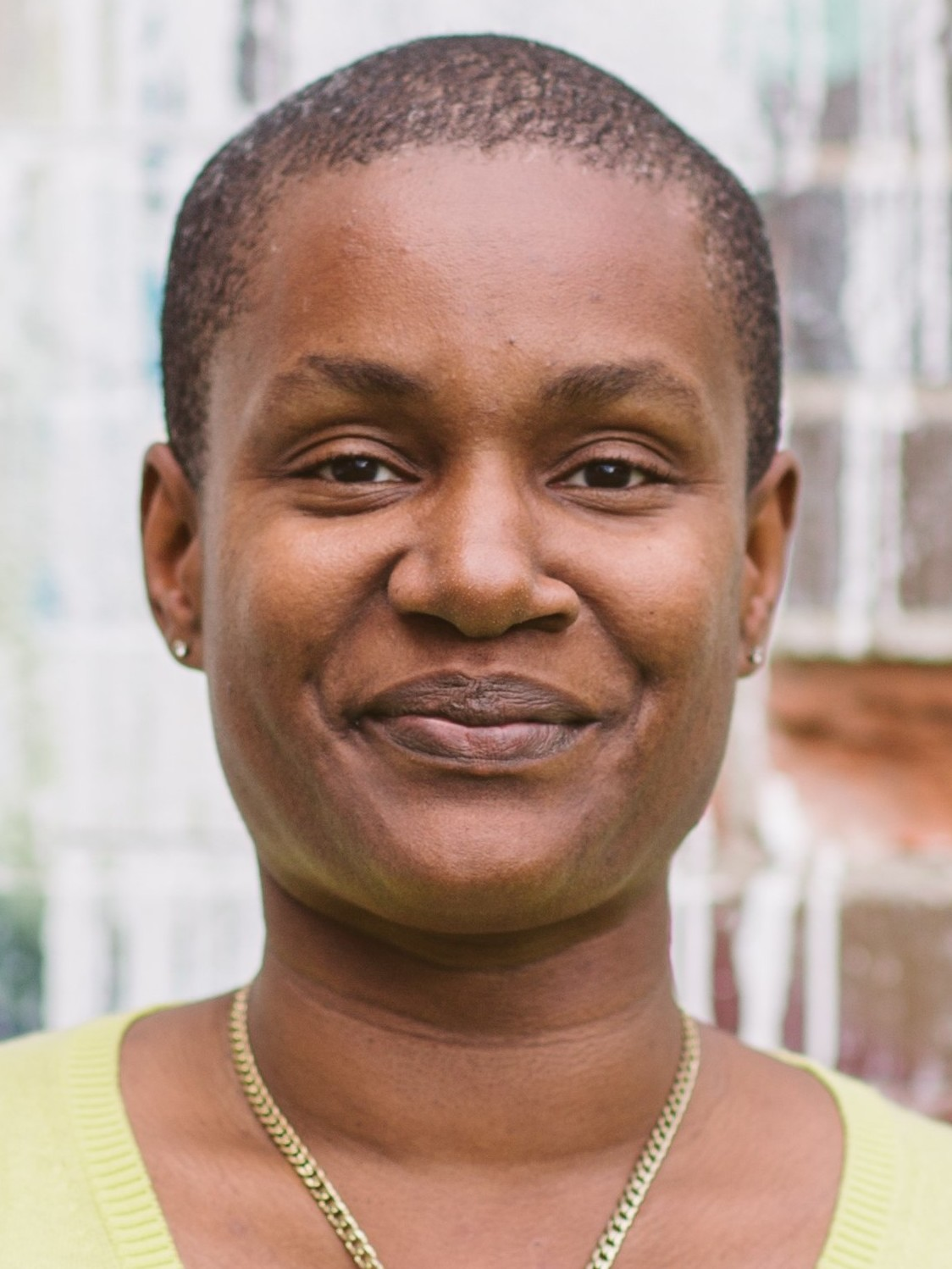
	First party	Second party
Candidate	Marci Ien	Annamie Paul
Party	Liberal	Green
Popular vote	10,581	8,250
Percentage	41.98%	32.73%
Swing	▼15.39pp	▲25.66pp
	Third party	Fourth party
	NDP	CPC
Candidate	Brian Chang	Benjamin Gauri Sharma
Party	New Democratic	Conservative
Popular vote	4,280	1,435
Percentage	16.98%	5.69%
Swing	▼5.29pp	▼6.44pp
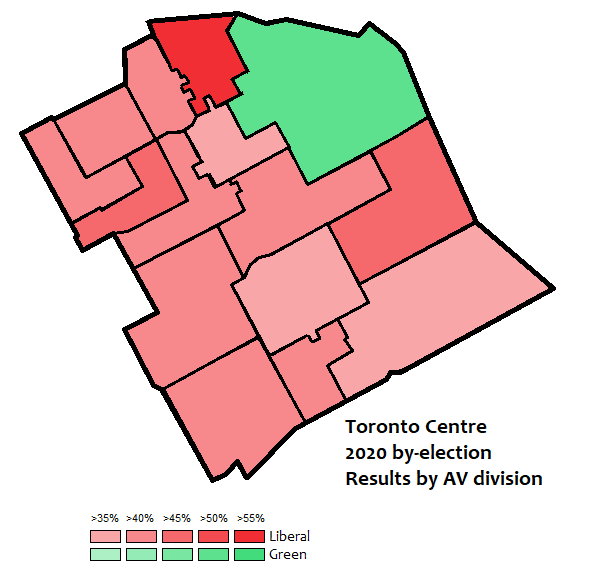
MP before election
Bill Morneau
Liberal
Elected MP
Marci Ien
Liberal

A by-election was held in the federal riding of Toronto Centre in Ontario on October 26, 2020, following the resignation of incumbent Liberal MP and Minister of Finance Bill Morneau. After 5 years in Parliament, and as many years as finance minister, Morneau resigned both positions on August 17, 2020, to seek the position of secretary-general of the Organization for Economic Cooperation and Development (OECD), in the wake of the WE Charity scandal.

The seat was held for the Liberals by journalist Marci Ien on a much reduced majority, as a result of the scandal and a strong campaign fought by Annamie Paul, the new Leader of the Green Party. The Greens finished with a historic high share of the vote in the riding.

It was held on the same day as the by-election in nearby York Centre.

== Background ==
=== Constituency ===
Toronto Centre is an urban constituency at the centre of Toronto. The constituency covers the heart of Downtown Toronto and contains diverse areas such as Regent Park, St. James Town, Cabbagetown, and Church and Wellesley.

The riding also contains Ryerson University (now Toronto Metropolitan University), The Toronto Eaton Centre and part of the city's financial district (the east side of Bay Street). Toronto Centre is the geographically smallest and has the highest population density of any riding in Canada.

=== Representation ===
Toronto Centre has been a safe seat for the Liberal Party of Canada since 1993. Former MPs include Bill Graham and Bob Rae, both former interim leaders of the Liberal Party.

Bill Morneau became the MP for Toronto Centre at the 2015 election, and immediately joined the 29th Canadian Ministry as Minister of Finance under Justin Trudeau. He was re-elected with a marginally increased majority in 2019.

Morneau resigned due to the WE Charity scandal, standing down as both finance minister and a Member of Parliament.

== Campaign ==
It was announced on September 17 that broadcast journalist Marci Ien, co-host of The Social and former co-anchor of Canada AM, was appointed as the Liberal candidate.

New Democrat Brian Chang, who had been the party's candidate in 2019, won the party's nomination over Caleb Chapman, Walied Khogali Ali, and Sebastian Mendoza-Price.

The Conservatives initially nominated Ryan Lester, who later withdrew and was replaced by Benjamin Sharma, who previously ran for the party in the 2014 Trinity—Spadina by-election.

The Greens nominated newly elected leader Annamie Paul, who previously ran in the riding for the Greens in the 2019 election. At the time of her nomination, Paul was a candidate in the party's leadership election, and received the party's permission to run in the byelection.

Baljit Bawa announced himself as the People's Party of Canada candidate after Maxime Bernier chose to run in York Centre.

The leader of the provincial Ontario Libertarian Party, Keith Komar, canvassed to get enough signatures to be on the federal Toronto Centre ballot.

Perennial candidate Kevin Clarke registered as an independent candidate.

Perennial candidate Dwayne Cappelletti registered as a candidate for Free Party Canada, the final requirement for becoming a registered political party.

Perennial candidate Above Znoneofthe, a member of None of the Above Direct Democracy Party, registered as No Affiliation by leaving the party affiliation box on his registration papers blank.

Rhinoceros Party leader Sébastien CoRhino announced via Twitter that the party had a candidate in Toronto Centre and was looking for one in York Centre. The declared candidate for Toronto Centre, Sean Carson, did not appear on the list of confirmed candidates after the registration deadline.

The Speaker's warrant regarding the vacancy was received on August 24, 2020; under the Parliament of Canada Act the writ for a by-election had to be dropped no later than February 20, 2021, 180 days after the Chief Electoral Officer was officially notified of the vacancy via a warrant issued by the Speaker. Under the Canada Elections Act, the minimum length of a campaign is 36 days between dropping the writ and election day.

== Results ==
Canadian federal by-election, October 26, 2020: Toronto Centre Resignation of Bill Morneau
Party	Candidate	Votes	%	±%	Expenditures
Liberal	Marci Ien	10,581	42.0	-15.4	$116,839
Green	Annamie Paul	8,250	32.7	+25.6	$100,008
New Democratic	Brian Chang	4,280	17.0	-5.3	$71,222
Conservative	Benjamin Gauri Sharma	1,435	5.7	-6.4	$0
People's	Baljit Bawa	269	1.1	–	$22,752
Libertarian	Keith Komar	135	0.5	–	
Independent	Kevin Clarke	123	0.5	–	
Free	Dwayne Cappelletti	76	0.3	–	$1,570
No affiliation	Above Znoneofthe	56	0.2	–	$0
Total valid votes		25,205	100.0	–	
Total rejected ballots		118	0.5	-0.2	
Turnout		25,323	30.9	-35.2	
Electors on lists		81,861			
Liberal hold		Swing		-20.5	
Elections Canada

Note: Candidates' names are as registered with Elections Canada.

== 2019 result ==
2019 Canadian federal election: Toronto Centre
Party	Candidate	Votes	%	±%	Expenditures
Liberal	Bill Morneau	31,271	57.37	−0.53	$95,538.84
New Democratic	Brian Chang	12,142	22.27	−4.34	$58,656.81
Conservative	Ryan Lester	6,613	12.13	−0.06	$39,309.94
Green	Annamie Paul	3,852	7.07	+4.47	$34,903.20
Animal Protection	Rob Lewin	182	0.33	–	$2,171.71
Rhinoceros	Sean Carson	147	0.27	–	–
Independent	Jason Tavares	126	0.23	–	–
Communist	Bronwyn Cragg	125	0.23	−0.03	$626.58
Marxist–Leninist	Philip Fernandez	54	0.10	−0.05	–
Total valid votes/expense limit		54,512	99.30	–	$107,308.65
Total rejected ballots		384	0.70	+0.18	
Turnout		54,896	66.08	−3.27	
Eligible voters		83,076			
Liberal hold		Swing		+1.90	
Source: Elections Canada
