= Perry Dellelce =

Canadian Lawyer and philanthropist

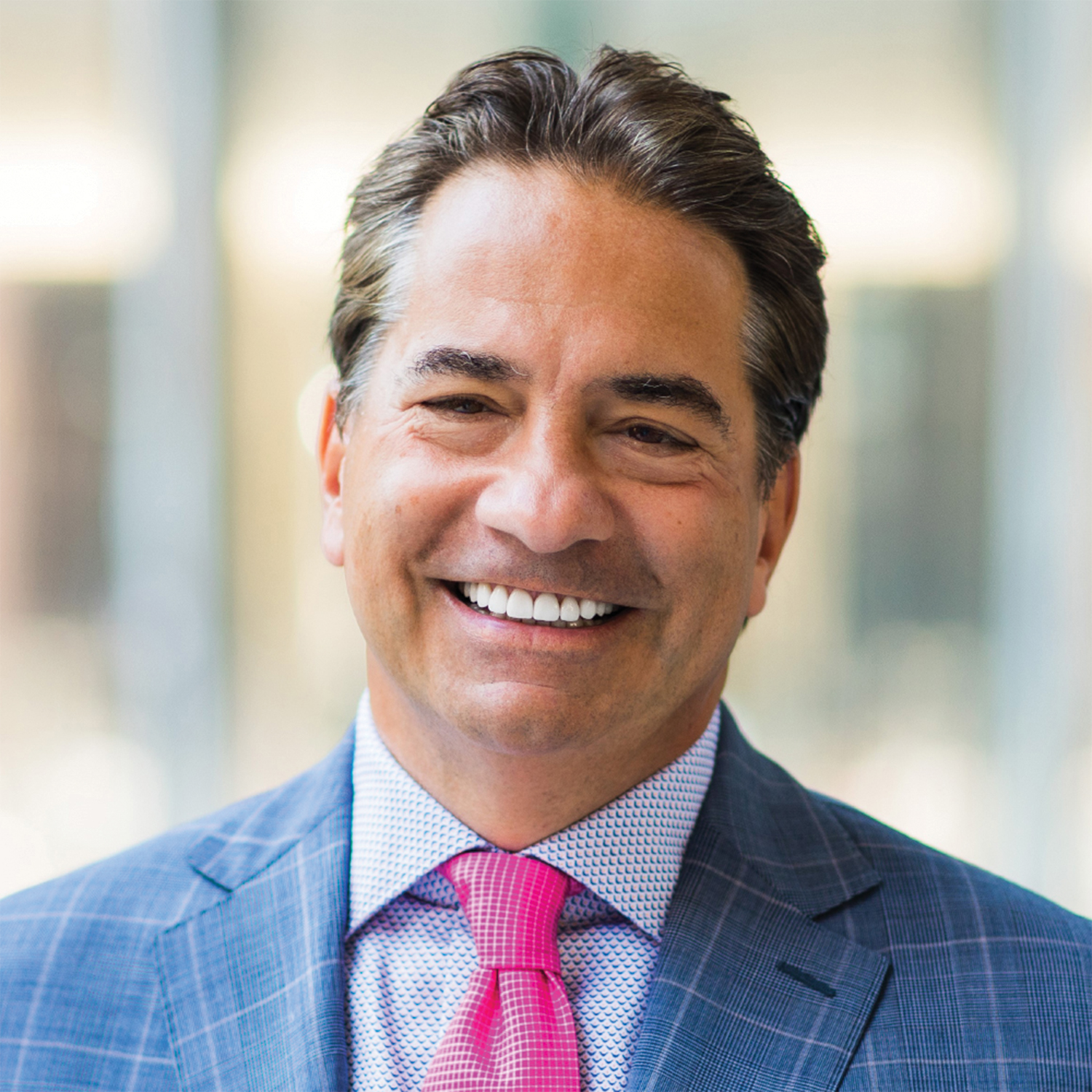
- Education: Western University, University of Notre Dame, University of Ottawa
- Occupations: Lawyer, Entrepreneur & Philanthropist
- Organization: Wildeboer Dellelce LLP
- Title: Founder, Managing Partner

Perry Dellelce is a Canadian lawyer, entrepreneur and philanthropist. He is founder and managing partner of Wildeboer Dellelce.

Dellelce has served in volunteer leadership roles for the Sunnybrook Foundation, Western University, the University of Ottawa, the University of Notre Dame and the Canadian Olympic Foundation.

== Education ==
Dellelce received a Bachelor of Arts from Western University in 1985 and a Master of Business Administration from University of Notre Dame in 1987.

He graduated from the University of Ottawa's Faculty of Law in 1990 and was called to the Ontario Bar in 1992.

=== Doctorates ===
Dellelce has been awarded multiple honorary doctorates in Law:

- Laurentian University in 2017
- Western University in 2022
- University of Ottawa in 2023

== Career ==
After graduating from Law School in 1990, Dellelce worked as an articling student at Bay Street law firm Stikeman Elliott where he was the only one of 18 students not offered a full-time position. In 1993, Dellelce, along with four partners from Stikeman, founded Wildeboer Dellelce, where Dellelce focused on business relationships with issuers and underwriters.

== Philanthropy ==
Dellelce has also made numerous philanthropic donations, supporting education, sports and the arts.

He has been repeatedly recognized by Western University for his fundraising efforts, receiving the university's Albert Citation in 2002 and Purple and White Award in 2014.

== Awards & Recognition ==
- In 2025, he was named one of Toronto's 50 most influential residents by Toronto Life.
- In 2019, he received the Rotary Club's Paul Harris Award.
- In 2018, he received the Sunnybrook Rose Award.
- In 2015, he was named a Distinguished Alumni by the Mendoza College of Business.
- In 2014, he received the Italian Chamber of Commerce Community Building Award.
