= Mike Crawley =

Canadian businessman and politician

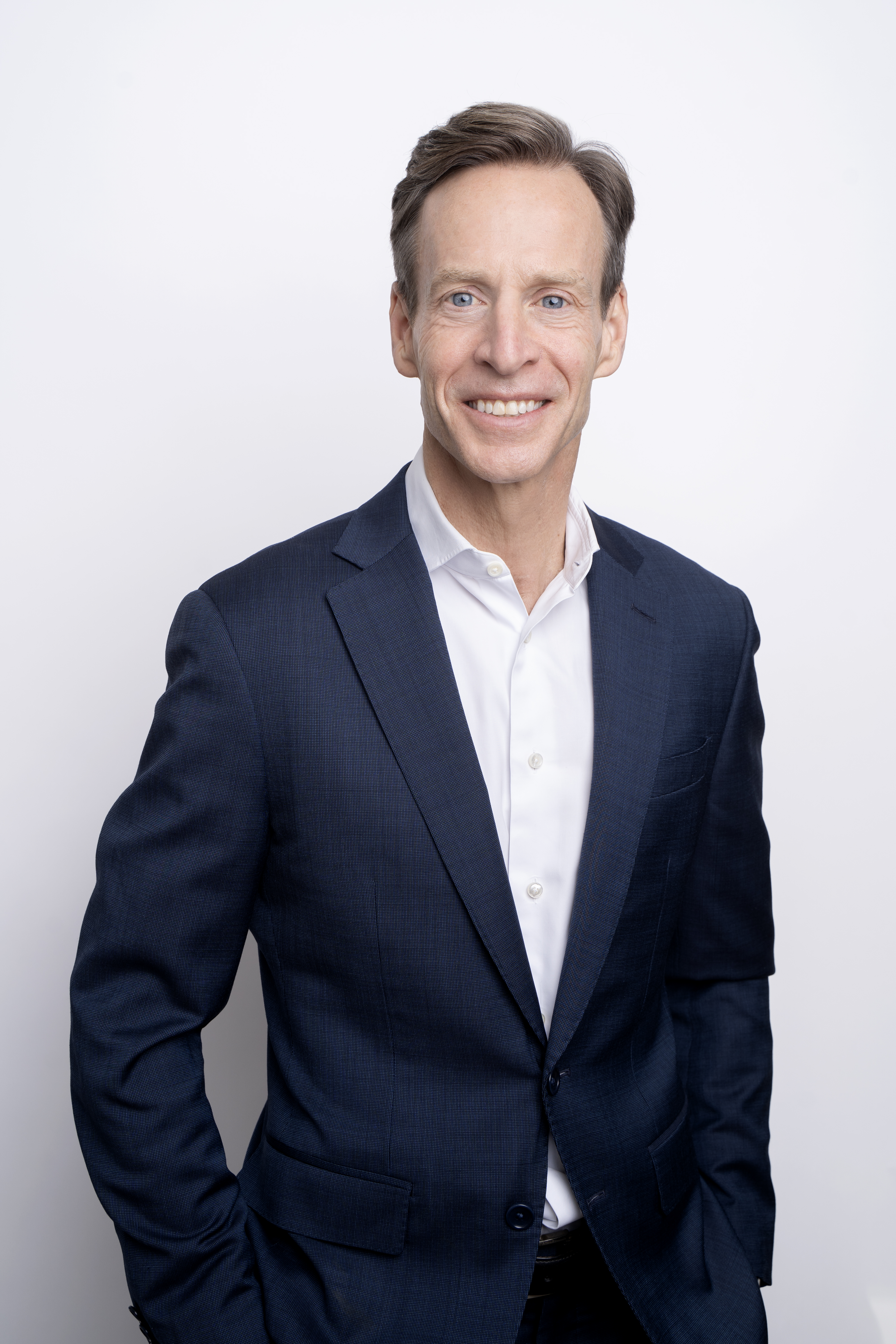
Mike Crawley

Mike Crawley is a Canadian businessman and politician who was the former president of the Liberal Party of Canada. He previously was the chief executive officer of AIM Power Generation and Northland Power.

== Early life ==
Crawley’s parents emigrated from Scotland in the 1960s. His dad found a job as a public servant, and his mom as a teacher. Crawley is from the Ottawa region.

After graduating from Nepean High School, he earned a Bachelor’s degree in Political Science from Western University before moving to Toronto.

Today, he lives in Toronto’s Parkdale–High Park neighbourhood with his wife, Heather, a marketing consultant. They have two daughters.

== Business career ==
Previously he worked in senior roles for Canadian Imperial Bank of Commerce.

From 2002 to 2009, Crawley was CEO of AIM PowerGen Corporation, a wind and solar power developer, owner and operator until International Power Inc. acquired it in 2009. Crawley continued as President of International Power Canada and, its successor, GDF Suez Canada until 2014.

Crawley was president and CEO of Northland Power between 2018 and 2024, having joined the company's executive team in 2015. On March 25, 2024, Northland Power announced that Crawley and Northland's Board of Directors "have agreed to a change in leadership for the Company" and that Crawley will step down from his position effective September 30, 2024.

== Political career ==
Crawley joined the Liberal Party after their defeat in the 1984 election. He was as an aide to former Ontario Liberal Party leader Lyn McLeod.

=== Federal politics ===
Crawley was previously president of the federal party's Ontario wing.

In January 2012, Crawley was elected president of the Liberal Party of Canada for a two-year term, defeating former Deputy Prime Minister Sheila Copps by 26 votes. In 2013, he announced that he was not going to run for re-election.

=== Post presidency ===
In November 2025, it was reported that Crawley had begun assembling a team and was considering running for leader of the Ontario Liberal Party. On March 5, 2026, he decided not to run for the leadership.

Party political offices
| Preceded by Alfred Apps | President of the Liberal Party of Canada; 2012–2014 | Succeeded by Anna Gainey |
