= Fettes =

Fettes may refer to:

- Fettes College, a private school in Edinburgh, Scotland
- Fettes Brot, a German hip-hop group
- Fettesian-Lorettonian Club, Sports Club

== People with the surname ==
- Christopher Fettes (born 1937), English-born Irish teacher and social activist
- Ian Dundas Fettes (1945-2025), NZ-born genealogist
- William Fettes (1750-1836), Sir William Fettes, First Baronet, Scottish businessman and philanthropist

== See also ==
- Vettese, another variant of the name
- Fiddes
