= Verificat =

Verificat is a fact-checking project created in April 2019 to combat misinformation in Catalonia. Created as an independent non-profit, the project was inspired by the platforms of the Poynter Institute's International Fact-Checking Network, and in 2020 has become a verified signatory of its Code of Principles.

The platform was founded by Alba Tobella and Lorenzo Marini, its current co-directors, together with Carola Solé, Roser Toll, Carina Bellver and Elisa Vivas, before the Barcelona municipal election campaign of 2019. The project has received financial support from the Open Society Foundations since 2019.
