= Wildeboer Dellelce =

Canadian law firm

Wildeboer Dellelce LLP
- Headquarters: Toronto, Canada
- Key people: Perry Dellelce, Managing Director
- Date founded: 1993

Wildeboer Dellelce is a Canadian securities and business transaction law firm. The firm was founded in 1993 by five partners from Stikeman Elliott LLP.

In 2017 the firm added financial services following a 50 per cent stake in accounting firm Numeric Answers.

In 2023 the firm was named as one of Canada's Best Law Firms in a Globe and Mail survey of Canadian lawyers. That same year the firm became sponsor and official legal services partner of Canada Basketball.
