= NovaSource Power Services =

Solar operations and maintenance company

- Industry: Solar power
- Headquarters: Chandler, Arizona, United States
- Services: Utility-scale solar O&M Commercial & industrial solar O&M Battery energy storage system O&M Residential solar O&M (U.S. only)
- Parent: Clairvest Group, 2020–present
- Website: www.novasourcepower.com

NovaSource Power Services is an American firm providing operations and maintenance (O&M) services for solar photovoltaic installations. As of April 2021, it was the largest global solar O&M provider, offering services for utility-scale, industrial, and commercial solar installations in multiple countries. The company manages 20 GW of installed solar capacity and $20 million in solar assets as of May 2022.

== History ==
=== 2020: Founding ===
NovaSource was founded in 2020 after the Clairvest Group, a Canadian equity management firm, acquired the operations and maintenance division of SunPower Corporation. SunPower’s previous O&M management team were bought out, becoming material shareholders. Jack Bennett, a co-founder of the company and the previous VP of Operations & Maintenance at SunPower, served as NovaSource’s CEO during the transitional period until November 2021.

=== 2021: Further acquisitions and European expansion ===
In January 2021, NovaSource merged with SunSystem Technology, a commercial and residential solar O&M firm, with combined operations taking place under NovaSource’s name. As a result of the merger, the number of field technicians working at NovaSource increased to 550, distributed across the United States.

NovaSource acquired BALIAN Energy, a French solar plant commissioner, in February 2021. The acquisition marked NovaSource’s first entry into the European solar market.

In April 2021, NovaSource acquired the North American O&M assets of First Solar, with First Solar divesting their O&M business in order to streamline operations. After the acquisition, the number of service technicians employed by NovaSource increased to 700, making the company's solar operations and maintenance workforce the largest in the world. In the same month, NovaSource also signed a lease for a new headquarters office in Chandler, Arizona.

Troy Lauterbach, NovaSource’s other co-founder and the former VP of Energy Services at First Solar, took over as the company’s CEO in November 2021.

In December 2021, NovaSource acquired Heliolytics Inc., an aerial inspection and solar PV data company, to expand its lifecycle services offerings. Heliolytics continues to operate under its own name and supports NovaSource with aerial inspection, analysis, and data-based optimisation of solar installations. In 2022, NovaSource began offering a direct current (DC) availability guarantee based on its proprietary monitoring platform and Heliolytics technology.

=== 2022: OMERS investment and Australia expansion ===
In August 2022, NovaSource received a $100 million investment from OMERS Private Equity, the buyout arm of Ontario’s pension fund. The investment is part of OMERS’ stated goal of moving away from fossil fuel holdings.

NovaSource acquired First Solar’s Australian O&M business in October 2022, marking its first entry into the Australian market. The acquisition added approximately 500 MW of solar capacity to NovaSource’s operations portfolio.

== Operation areas ==
As of 2022, NovaSource provides operations and maintenance services for utility-scale, commercial, and industrial solar installations, as well as battery storage systems, in 12 countries. These are:

- The United States
- Canada
- Chile
- Portugal
- Spain
- France
- Germany
- Italy
- Jordan
- Morocco
- South Africa
- Australia

The company also provides residential solar maintenance services in the United States.

Among other photovoltaic installations, NovaSource's U.S. operations portfolio includes the Topaz Solar Farm and Solar Star plants in California, Umbriel Solar in Texas, Sun Streams 3 in Arizona, and Assembly II and III in Michigan. The company also works with the Sacramento Municipal Utility District to perform maintenance for a combination solar plant and habitat restoration area at the former Ranch Seco nuclear site. In Australia, NovaSource operates Greenough River Solar Farm, the country's oldest solar plant.

== Awards and appearances ==
The research and consultancy group Wood Mackenzie listed NovaSource as the #1 global solar O&M provider in 2021 and 2022.

In November 2022, NovaSource’s Global Business Services Center in the Philippines was certified as a Great Place to Work by the organisation of the same name, with an 84% employee satisfaction rating.

NovaSource was featured on Advancements with Ted Danson, an educational television series focusing on innovative technologies, in 2022.
