= Exempt market dealer =

Canadian financial regulatory category of broker-dealer

Exempt market dealer (EMD) is a Canadian financial regulatory category of broker-dealer that is allowed to deal in exempt market securities across the country. Unlike other dealer types they have less regulation and are not required be a member of a self-regulatory organization such as the Investment Industry Regulatory Organization of Canada (IIROC) but still need to be registered and still have the same know your customer (KYC) requirements as other brokers.

== History ==
In 2010, the Canadian Securities Administrators (CSA) made the harmonization of the registration rules among the jurisdictions of Canada a key goal. Pursuant to this goal new national securities regulations were drafted - NI 31-103 to provide uniform requirements and categories of registration for dealers in exempt market securities across Canada.

=== Western Exemption - Blanket Order ===
As of 2010, a number of registration exemptions are being maintained in certain jurisdictions – particularly in Alberta, British Columbia, Manitoba, the Northwest Territories, Nunavut and the Yukon Territory. In 2011, Alberta has set their blanket order for NI 31-505.

The Blanket Order provided an exemption to a firm or person that trades in securities (subject to meeting all of the conditions of the Blanket Order) under one of the following capital-raising exemptions in National Instrument 45-106 – Prospectus and Registration Exemptions:

- Accredited investor;
- Family, friends and business associates;
- Offering memorandum; or
- CAD$150,000 minimum purchase.

== Requirements ==
Regulation NI 31-103 introduces consistent rules for Exempt Market Dealers concerning proficiency, conduct, capital and compliance requirements and makes it clear that EMDs are subject to the same know-your-client (“KYC”) and suitability requirements as other dealer categories.

Exempt market dealers, and the registered individuals who work for them, may act as a dealer or underwriter for any securities which are prospectus exempt, as a dealer for any securities sold to clients who qualify for purchase of exempt securities, and as a dealer for investment funds which are either prospectus qualified or prospectus exempt.

Exempt market dealers are different than:

- Full service investment dealers which engage in trading for all types of clients including retail clients and are required to be members of the self-regulatory organization, the Investment Industry Regulatory Organization of Canada (IIROC);
- Mutual fund dealers which are restricted to trading in mutual funds and are required to be members of the self-regulatory organization, the Mutual Funds Dealers Association (MFDA);
- Scholarship plan dealers which are restricted to trading in scholarship plans and educational trusts; and
- Restricted dealers.

Exempt market dealers must also ensure that any exempt security is suitable for a particular client by considering the particular investment product as well as each individual client's investment goals and profile. EMD advisors need to make sure their letters of engagement and investment policy statements clearly outline mutual expectations and the manner in which the advisor is being paid.

The applicable provincial and territorial securities legislation, regulations and rules for any person or firm will generally depend on the jurisdiction of residence of the investor and dealer or adviser and the jurisdiction in which the registerable activity occurs.

== See also ==
- Accredited investor
- Canadian Securities Administrators
- Canadian securities regulation
