= Eleanore A. Cronk =

Canadian judge

Eleanore A. Cronk was a justice of the Court of Appeal for Ontario in Canada. Cronk is a graduate of the University of Windsor Faculty of Law. She had also previously been chair of the Canadian Bar Association National Task Force on Systems of Civil Justice.

Cronk was called to the bar in 1977, elected as a Bencher of the Law Society in 1995 and appointed to the Court of Appeal for Ontario in 2001; she retired in 2018.

In 1997, she co-founded the firm of Lax O’Sullivan Cronk.

In 2018, she was awarded an honorary Doctor of Laws (LLD) from the Law Society of Ontario.
