= Free Party Canada =

Free Party Canada Parti Libre Canada
- Leader: Michel Leclerc
- Registered: 2016 (provincial); September 30, 2020 (federal)
- Dissolved: December 31, 2024
- Headquarters: 27A Hochar Avenue Saint-Sauveur, Quebec J0R 1R4
- Ideology: Direct democracy; Anti-vaccine activism
- Colours: Gold

Website
- partilibrecanada.org

Free Party Canada (French: Parti Libre Canada) was a minor federal political party in Canada that also existed provincially in Quebec as a provincial and municipal party. It was led by Michel Leclerc, advocated for direct democracy and lower taxes, and promoted vaccine hesitancy.

== History ==
In 2016, the party registered provincially in Quebec as Parti libre Saint-Sauveur ("Free Party Saint-Sauveur"). It ran in local elections in Saint-Sauveur, as well as in the 2017 by-election for Gouin. Its eight candidates in the 2018 Quebec general election received a total of 1,618 votes. Registered federally on September 30, 2020, its first federal campaign was for the 2020 Toronto Centre federal by-election.

=== 2021 election ===
The party ran 59 candidates in the 2021 Canadian federal election, most of them in Quebec or in Francophone areas of New Brunswick and Ontario, garnering over 47,000 votes. Its platform attracted notice for its opposition to mandated COVID vaccination and vaccination passports, and some candidates had been active in organising events opposed to the pandemic health measures. The party also called for the introduction of a direct democracy and lower taxes. Other candidates raised issues of housing affordability, transport and local accountability to electors. Party leader Michel Leclerc ran in Laurentides—Labelle, where he had been an independent candidate in the 2019 Canadian federal election. In an interview with a TVA comedian at an anti-vaccination rally, Leclerc claimed that viruses were humans, that vaccinations decreased life expectancy, and (claiming to be trained as an astronaut) denied the Moon landing.

=== Deregistration ===
After failing to comply with financial reporting obligations in the Canada Elections Act in 2023, Free Party Canada was deregistered by Elections Canada, effective December 31, 2024.

== Election results ==
=== Federal ===
Election	Leader	Candidates	Votes	% of votes	% where running	Seats won	+/−	Rank	Outcome
2021	Michel Leclerc	59 / 338	47,254	0.28%	1.46	0 / 338		7th	No seats

=== Provincial ===
Election	Leader	Candidates	Votes	%	Seats won	+/−	Rank	Outcome
2018	Michel Leclerc	8 / 125	1,678	0.04%	0 / 125		12th	No seats

=== Municipal (Saint-Sauveur) ===
Election	Leader	Candidates	Votes (Mayor)	%	Seats won	+/−	Rank	Outcome
2017	Michel Leclerc	7 / 7	88	2.39%	0 / 7		4th	No seats
2021	Michel Leclerc	5 / 7	36	0.95%	0 / 7	Steady	4th	No seats
