= Canadian Network of Asset Managers =

Canadian not-for-profit organization

Canadian Network of Asset Managers (CNAM) is the association of public infrastructure asset management in Canada. CNAM is a not-for-profit organization composed of both government and private sector members. The organization is committed to developing policy, tools and technologies that improve public infrastructure assets in Canada. The organization was initially founded by seven Canadian municipalities. It later grew and formed partnerships in and outside Canada. Among the main tasks of CNAM are educating municipalities on asset management and engaging younger generations in municipal asset management.
