= Prospectus (finance) =

Disclosure document for potential buyers

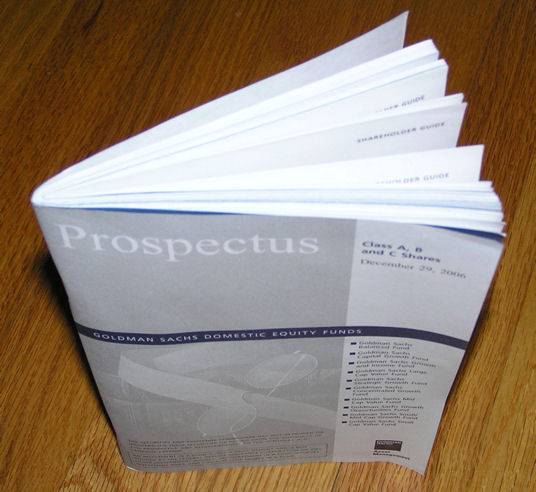
A prospectus from the US

A prospectus, in finance, is a disclosure document that describes a financial security for potential buyers. It commonly provides investors with material information about mutual funds, stocks, bonds and other investments, such as a description of the company's business, financial statements, biographies of officers and directors, detailed information about their compensation, any litigation that is taking place, a list of material properties and any other material information. In the context of an individual securities offering, such as an initial public offering, a prospectus is distributed by underwriters or other financial firms to potential investors. Today, prospectuses are most widely distributed through websites such as EDGAR and its equivalents in other countries.

== United States ==
In a securities offering in the United States, a prospectus is required to be filed with the Securities and Exchange Commission (SEC) as part of a registration statement. The issuer may not use the prospectus to finalize sales until the registration statement has been declared effective by the SEC, meaning it appears to comply on its face with the various rules governing disclosure unless the sale of securities is exempt from registration.

If a company has been filing Form 10-K with the SEC for a certain period of time, has a market capitalization above a certain threshold, and takes certain procedural steps, it is permitted to offer securities using a simplified prospectus that incorporates information by reference to its SEC filings. In certain situations, such as when the offering is not required to be registered with the SEC, a prospectus is instead referred to as an "offering memorandum" or "offering circular", but there are numerous industry standard terms and methods on how to write prospectus. In the case of municipal securities offerings, which are generally exempt from most of the federal securities laws, municipal issuers typically prepare an analogous form of disclosure document known as an "official statement." Prospectuses are generally prepared with the assistance of the underwriter acting as issue manager (also called a bookrunning manager or "bookrunner").

== United Kingdom ==
Publication of information in relation to the issue of securities in the United Kingdom is governed by the Prospectus Rules, which implement the European law Prospectus Directive. A prospectus must be published where certain types of securities either are offered to the public or are requested for admission on a regulated market. In the United Kingdom, the only regulated market is London Stock Exchange full list. The Alternative Investment Market (AIM) does not constitute a regulated market, nor does the Professional Securities Market ("PSM") for issues of debt securities. There are numerous exceptions to the requirement to publish a prospectus, although an exempt company may still be required to publish listing particulars where it is seeking admission of its shares to the full list or an admission document where it is seeking admission of its shares to AIM.

The prospectus must be approved by the competent authority in the United Kingdom, which is currently the Financial Conduct Authority (FCA) in its capacity as the United Kingdom Listing Authority. If the purpose of the prospectus is to induce people to engage in an investment activity, it will also need to be issued or approved by an 'authorised person' or it will constitute an unlawful financial promotion under section 21 of the Financial Services and Markets Act 2000.

== See also ==
- Capital markets
- Securities law
- Shelf prospectus
- Indenture, a document describing a bond issue
- Electronic Municipal Market Access System
