= LifeWorks =

Canadian professional services company

- Type: Public
- Traded as: TSX: LWRK
- Industry: Professional services
- Founded: 1966; 60 years ago
- Defunct: September 1, 2022
- Fate: Acquired by Telus
- Successor: Telus Health
- Headquarters: Toronto, Ontario, Canada
- Key people: Stephen Liptrap, president and chief executive officer Scott Milligan, executive vice president and chief financial officer Gillian Denham, chair of the board
- Services: Health and Benefits, Administrative Outsourcing, Asset and Risk Management, Retirement and Pensions
- Revenue: ▲$722.3 million CAD (2018)
- Number of employees: 6,000
- Website: lifeworks.com

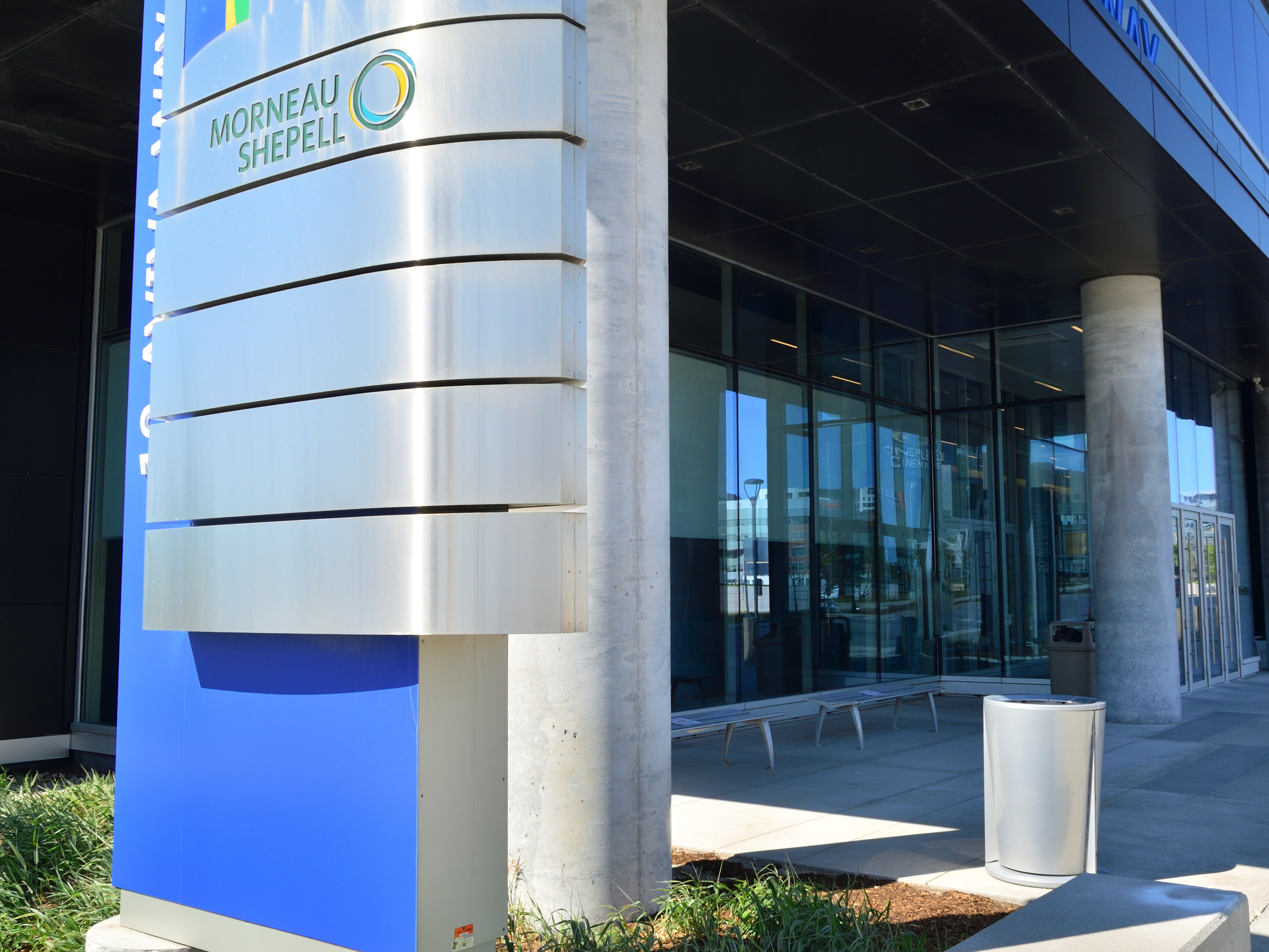
Morneau Shepell office in Markham

LifeWorks, formerly known as Morneau Shepell, was a human resources services and technology company headquartered in Toronto, Ontario, Canada. Established in 1966, LifeWorks served approximately 24,000 clients in North America. Besides North American offices, LifeWorks also had offices outside North America, including Brazil, Australia and the United Kingdom. LifeWorks was a publicly traded company on the Toronto Stock Exchange (TSX: MSI), with market capitalization of $2 billion.

On September 1, 2022, Telus closed its acquisition of LifeWorks for $2.9 billion, and merged the company into Telus Health.

== History ==
In 1966, Frank Morneau founded W. F. Morneau & Associates, an actuarial and benefit consulting firm. The firm expanded to open its first U.S. office in 1987 and it launched its administrative outsourcing practice in 1996.

W.F. Morneau & Associates merged with Sobeco in 1997 to establish Morneau Sobeco, led by Bill Morneau as president and chief executive officer. Morneau Shepell, as it was formerly known, was formed in May 2008 through Morneau Sobeco's acquisition of Shepell-fgi – Canada's largest provider of employee health management and workplace training and education services – from Clairvest Group Inc. for $321.9 million.

In the following years, Morneau Shepell made a number of acquisitions, including SBC Systems Company Inc. (U.S. provider of employee benefits administration systems) in January 2012, Mercer Canada's pension and benefits outsourcing business in November 2012, Ceridian's U.S. health and welfare benefits administration business in August 2015, Montreal-based Solareh (national health and wellness services provider that offers employee assistance programs) in December 2016, Montreal-based Longpré (employee assistance and wellness program provider) in January 2017, LifeWorks (platform focused on EAP, employee engagement, rewards and recognition, and human resources communications) in July 2018, and Mercer's stand-alone, large market, health and defined benefit pension plan administration business in the United States.

=== Milestones and acquisitions ===
- In 1966, W.F. Morneau & Associates ("Morneau") was established.
- In 1992, Morneau formed a strategic alliance with Coopers & Lybrand.
- In 1997, W.F. Morneau & Associates and Sobeco merged to form Morneau Sobeco.
- In 1998, Morneau acquired Canadian pension consulting practice of Deloitte & Touche.
- In 2005, the firm became an income trust: Morneau Sobeco Income Fund (MSIF).
- In 2006, MSIF acquired Heath Benefits Consulting.
- In 2007, MSIF acquired the defined benefit pension business of Cowan Benefits Consulting.
- In 2008, MSIF acquired the actuarial firm of Leong & Associates.
- In 2008, Morneau Sobeco acquired Shepell.fgi.
- In 2011, Morneau Shepell completed the reorganization of Morneau Sobeco Income Fund from an income trust structure into a public corporation named Morneau Shepell.
- On September 30, 2011, Morneau Shepell acquired Jacques Lamarre & Associates and Parcours d'enfant.
- On January 31, 2012, Morneau Shepell acquired SBC Systems.
- On November 1, 2012, Morneau Shepell acquired the Canadian pension and benefits administration practice of Mercer Canada.
- On July 5, 2013, Morneau Shepell acquired Dion Durrell's workers' compensation business.
- On September 3, 2013, Morneau Shepell acquired Collage Pediatric Therapy.
- On March 3, 2014, Morneau Shepell acquired Groupe AST from ADP Canada.
- On March 31, 2014, Morneau Shepell acquired Pacific Risk Management Corp.
- On July 7, 2014, Morneau Shepell acquired Blue Balloon Health Services.
- On August 4, 2015, Morneau Shepell acquired the U.S. health and welfare benefits administration business of Ceridian.
- On December 1, 2015, Morneau Shepell acquired Bensinger, Dupont & Associates.
- On December 20, 2016, Morneau Shepell acquired Solareh.
- On January 10, 2017, Morneau Shepell acquired Longpré.
- On November 1, 2017, Morneau Shepell acquired Pro Health Group.
- On December 1, 2017, Morneau Shepell acquired Chestnut Global Partners.
- On July 27, 2018, Morneau Shepell acquired LifeWorks.
- On August 7, 2019, Morneau Shepell acquired Mercer's stand-alone, large market, health and defined benefit pension plan administration business in the United States.
- On September 16, 2019, Morneau Shepell acquired MorningStar Health.
- On May 17, 2021, the company's shareholders voted to change the company's name to LifeWorks.

=== Corporate social responsibility ===
In April 2019, Morneau Shepell published its inaugural corporate social responsibility report. The company implemented a board diversity policy to maintain a minimum of 30 per cent women and 30 per cent men on its board of directors, it joined the 30% Club and it created a diversity and inclusion council in early 2019.

In 2014, Morneau Shepell opened the Morneau Shepell Secondary School for Girls in the Kakuma Refugee Camp, located in northwestern Kenya. In 2016, Morneau Shepell pledged more than $1 million over five years to the school to cover operating costs such as teacher salaries, dorm supplies and security.

=== Acquisition ===
On June 16, 2022, Telus announced its intent to acquire LifeWorks and combine the company with its Telus Health division. The $2.9 billion offer included $2.3 billion of outstanding equity at $33 per share, and taking on $600 million in debt. The deal required regulatory and shareholder approval.

On September 1, 2022, Telus completed the acquisition and merged LifeWorks into Telus Health.

== Ethics controversy ==
Bill Morneau, the former finance minister of Canada, resigned from his position as executive chair of Morneau Shepell in October 2015. In October 2017, Mr. Morneau became the subject of intense scrutiny regarding his holdings in the company, including the effectiveness of moving his holdings into a blind trust to assuage any concerns. At the time, there were allegations that Morneau Shepell stood to benefit if a proposed small business taxation legislation was passed. Critics claimed that Morneau Shepell would benefit if the proposed changes prompted more people to use individual pension plans, a claim which Morneau rejected, In December 2017, Morneau Shepell said that individual pension plans account for less than one 25th of one per cent (0.04%) of the firm's revenues.

Mr. Morneau was also criticized for holding shares in Morneau Shepell outside a blind trust, and thus being in a conflict of interest situation with respect to the pension plan changes. In response, Mr. Morneau said that he acted on the recommendation of Conflict of Interest and Ethics Commissioner Mary Dawson, who stated that shares could remain behind a conflict-of-interest screen overseen by the minister's chief of staff, and that a blind trust was not necessary. The Conflict of Interest Act states "that any such assets, irrespective of their value, must be divested by either the establishment of a blind trust or by way of sale at arm's length." Mr. Morneau responded to the controversy by stating that he sold his remaining shares in Morneau Shepell and donated all of the money he's profited as a result of an increase in the value of the shares to charity.

It was reported that Mr. Morneau and his father sold Morneau Shepell shares before the tax change announcement in December 2015, before any potential increase in value would have occurred. Media reports state that Mr. Morneau sold 680,000 shares for proceeds of $10.1 million before December 7, 2015. Subsequently, Mr. Morneau is said to have sold an additional 320,000 shares on December 17, 2015, for a profit of $4.5 million, which he donated to charity. It was later reported that Mr. Morneau's father sold 100,000 shares in Morneau Shepell before the tax change announcement, on November 23, 2015, and 100,000 shares in Morneau Shepell on December 3, 2015.

== Leadership ==
In March 2017, Morneau Shepell announced Alan Torrie's retirement from the company and Stephen Liptrap as his successor to the position of president and chief executive officer, effective May 5, 2017.
