= Offering circular =

An offering memorandum (OM) or offering circular (OC) is a type of prospectus (finance) for a bond or other security. Sometimes, this is also referred to as a prospectus, offering memorandum, or short OC. The terms "offering memorandum", "OM", or "offering circular", "OC", are used instead of "prospectus" in certain situations, such as when the offering is not required to be registered with the United States Securities and Exchange Commission (SEC). Offering memoranda are needed when seeking securities identification numbers or listing on various global stock exchanges.
