= Western Canada Independence Party =

The Western Canada Party (WCP) is a Canadian political party that advocates the separation from Canada of the provinces of British Columbia, Alberta, Saskatchewan and Manitoba as well as the Yukon, Northwest Territories and Nunavut to form a new country as Western Canada.

The party was founded at a meeting in Strathmore, Alberta, in May 2005, electing party leader Tyron Blakney, and president Glen Dundas. At the founding, Mr. Blakney said "Western alienation and the desire for fundamental political change are long-simmering grievances and now that most people see that the system is completely corrupt, we hope the movement will quickly grow and that candidates will come forward to run in every western constituency."

The Western Canada Party hopes to give western voters an alternative to the "status quo" parties. The party hopes to achieve separation by democratic means but will work within the Canadian system initially to defend western values and interests.

The party has ties to the "Western Independence Party" founded by a group of 150 people from across the western provinces in 1987. It was formed because the group had grown dissatisfied with the direction of another western separatist party, the federal Western Block Party (WBP), led by lawyer Douglas Christie of Victoria, B.C.

At the WIP founding convention in October 1987 in Edmonton, Dr. Fred Marshall was elected interim leader. Marshall had run unsuccessfully for the leadership of the provincial Western Canada Concept in 1984, losing to future Reform Party Member of Parliament Jack Ramsay of Camrose, Alberta. Also at the founding convention, the party adopted "The West Canada Flag" which was designed by Mr. Dexter Dombro and was chosen from a field of eight other entries.

The WIP ran 14 candidates across western Canada in the federal election of 1988. All the candidates were soundly defeated with none garnering even 1% of the popular vote in any riding.

The party also has or had provincial branches in each of the four provinces. The federal wing of the Western Independence Party has been dormant since 1988. The party was resurrected shortly after the founding of the Western Block Party.

== WIP of British Columbia ==
The British Columbia provincial party called the Western Independence Party of BC (WIPBC) was not a branch of WIP. WIPBC has renamed itself the BC Refederation Party (BC Refed), and now promotes political changes within Canada.

BC Refed has drafted the text of a Constitution of BC and the text of a BC Direct Democracy Act based on the Swiss model of direct democracy. These are aimed at creating what it describes as a de jure (lawful) BC government. The party claims that Canada's federal government and the Supreme Court of Canada are both "de facto" (unlawful), arguing that Canada has no lawful constitution. The party does not consider the Constitution Act of 1982 to be lawful. Consequently, the party argues that the Canadian government, as constituted, is illegal.

== WIP of Alberta ==
The WIP of Alberta appears to be defunct. The Separation Party of Alberta (SPA), which nominated candidates in the 2004 provincial election, now promotes the cause of separation in the province. The SPA issued a statement of support when the WIP of Saskatchewan was formed in 2003. The Alberta Independence Party is also active, having experienced a resurgence of interest in 2018.

== WIP of Saskatchewan ==
The Western Independence Party of Saskatchewan does not intend to nominate candidates in federal elections.

== Party program ==
Party policy was adopted at the founding convention and was expanded at a policy convention in Saskatoon in April 1988.

The party's basic policy statements were the following:

1. independence as the only way Westerners could get political and economic justice;
2. the constitutional right to private property;
3. the citizen's right to referendum on major issues including the constitution and constitutional amendments;
4. English as the official language; and
5. an elected, equal and effective Senate.

== See also ==
- List of Canadian political parties
- Secessionist movements of Canada
- Western Canada Concept
- Western Independence Party of Saskatchewan
- Western Independence Party of Manitoba
- Wexit Canada
