= Colin Krieger =

Canadian politician

Leader of the Maverick Party
- In office May 14, 2022 – February 28, 2025
- Preceded by: Jay Hill
- Succeeded by: Party deregistered

Personal details
- Party: Maverick

Colin Rodger Krieger is a politician who was the former leader of the Maverick Party, a political party based in Alberta, Canada.

He ran for the Maverick Party in the 2021 Canadian federal election in Peace River—Westlock, and earned 5.5% of the vote.

On May 14, 2022, he was elected as the new leader of the party.

The Maverick Party was deregistered by Elections Canada on February 28, 2025, after "failing to provide the Registered Party's Annual Financial Transactions Return and auditor's report for 2023," and Krieger ceased to be leader of the party.

== Personal life ==
He has worked as a truck driver, an oilfield contractor and the owner of an oilfield paramedic service.

== Electoral record ==
2021 Canadian federal election: Peace River—Westlock
| Party | Candidate | Votes | % | ±% | Expenditures |
|---|---|---|---|---|---|
| Conservative | Arnold Viersen | 29,486 | 63.02 | –17.64 | $61,652.70 |
| New Democratic | Gail Ungstad | 6,019 | 12.86 | +5.34 | $10,267.72 |
| People's | Darryl Boisson | 5,916 | 12.64 | +9.59 | $3,808.47 |
| Maverick | Colin Krieger | 2,573 | 5.50 | – | $8,852.55 |
| Liberal | Leslie Penny | 2,431 | 5.20 | –0.90 | $3,859.51 |
| Green | Jordan Francis MacDougall | 364 | 0.78 | –1.89 | none listed |
| Total valid votes/expense limit | | 46,789 | 99.58 | – | $135,210.15 |
| Total rejected ballots | | 198 | 0.42 | –0.25 | |
| Turnout | | 46,987 | 62.08 | –6.50 | |
| Eligible voters | | 75,685 | | | |
| Conservative hold | | Swing | | –11.49 | |
Source: Elections Canada
