= Peace River—Westlock =

Federal electoral district in Alberta, Canada

Alberta electoral district
- Interactive map of riding boundaries from the 2025 federal election. Point indicates the towns of Peace River and Westlock.

Federal electoral district
- Legislature: House of Commons
MP
Arnold Viersen
Conservative
- District created: 2013
- First contested: 2015
- Last contested: 2025
- District webpage: profile, map

Demographics
- Population (2011): 108,095
- Electors (2019): 73,809
- Area (km²): 105,095
- Pop. density (per km²): 1
- Census division(s): Division No. 13, Division No. 17, Division No. 18, Division No. 19
- Census subdivision(s): Mackenzie, Whitecourt, Greenview (part), Westlock County, Slave Lake, Peace River, Barrhead County, Big Lakes, Westlock, Woodlands

Peace River—Westlock is a federal electoral district in Alberta, Canada, that has been represented in the House of Commons of Canada since 2015.

Peace River—Westlock was created by the 2012 federal electoral boundaries redistribution and was legally defined in the 2013 representation order. It came into effect upon the call of the 42nd Canadian federal election, scheduled for October 19, 2015. It was created out of parts of Peace River, Fort McMurray—Athabasca, Yellowhead, and Westlock—St. Paul.

Conservative Arnold Viersen, a former mechanic, has been the riding's MP since 2015.

== Demographics ==
Panethnic groups in Peace River—Westlock (2011−2021)
Panethnic group	2021		2016		2011	
Panethnic group	Pop.	%	Pop.	%	Pop.	%
European (Note: Statistic includes all persons that did not make up part of a visible minority or an indigenous identity.)	74,205	71.15%	77,435	72.56%	79,005	75.43%
Indigenous	23,365	22.4%	24,325	22.79%	22,525	21.5%
Southeast Asian (Note: Statistic includes total responses of "Filipino" and "Southeast Asian" under visible minority section on census.)	3,700	3.55%	2,355	2.21%	1,360	1.3%
South Asian	905	0.87%	620	0.58%	515	0.49%
African	790	0.76%	645	0.6%	200	0.19%
East Asian (Note: Statistic includes total responses of "Chinese", "Korean", and "Japanese" under visible minority section on census.)	595	0.57%	775	0.73%	520	0.5%
Middle Eastern (Note: Statistic includes total responses of "West Asian" and "Arab" under visible minority section on census.)	365	0.35%	225	0.21%	190	0.18%
Latin American	205	0.2%	190	0.18%	335	0.32%
Other/multiracial (Note: Statistic includes total responses of "Visible minority, n.i.e." and "Multiple visible minorities" under visible minority section on census.)	160	0.15%	160	0.15%	80	0.08%
Total responses	104,300	97.27%	106,720	97.05%	104,745	96.9%
Total population	107,223	100%	109,965	100%	108,095	100%
Notes: Totals greater than 100% due to multiple origin responses. Demographics based on 2012 Canadian federal electoral redistribution riding boundaries.

== Members of Parliament ==
This riding has elected the following members of the House of Commons of Canada:

Parliament	Years	Member	Party
Peace River—Westlock; Riding created from Fort McMurray—Athabasca, Peace River; Westlock—St. Paul, and Yellowhead
42nd	2015–2019	Arnold Viersen	Conservative
43rd	2019–2021	Arnold Viersen	Conservative
44th	2021–2025	Arnold Viersen	Conservative
45th	2025–present	Arnold Viersen	Conservative

== Profile ==
This riding is a typical conservative stronghold riding. There are several ridings in Alberta that the Conservative Party of Canada realistically expects to win, and this is one of them. Historically, this riding has been always right-leaning, with support beginning toward the old Progressive Conservative Party of Canada, shifting toward the right-populist Reform Party after the time of prime minister Brian Mulroney, and then held by the new Conservative Party of Canada since the unification of the Progressive Conservatives and Canadian Alliance in 2003.

== Election results ==
Graph of election results in Peace River—Westlock (minor parties that never got 2% of the vote or didn't run consistently are omitted)

=== 2023 representation order ===
2025 Canadian federal election
Party	Candidate	Votes	%	±%	Expenditures
Conservative	Arnold Viersen	41,130	77.07	+14.42	$46,167.37
Liberal	Luke Markowski	6,278	11.76	+6.28	$3,870.20
Independent	Darrell Teske	3,048	5.71	–	$3,401.45
New Democratic	Landen Tischer	2,913	5.46	–7.70	$3,117.39
Total valid votes/expense limit		53,369	99.26	–	$159,831.97
Total rejected ballots		398	0.74	+0.32	
Turnout		53,767	64.96	+2.88	
Eligible voters		82,772			
Conservative hold		Swing		+11.06	
Source: Elections Canada

2021 federal election redistributed results
Party	Vote	%
Conservative	30,446	62.65
New Democratic	6,396	13.16
People's	6,089	12.53
Liberal	2,664	5.48
Green	364	0.75
Others	2,635	5.42

=== 2013 representation order ===
2021 Canadian federal election
Party	Candidate	Votes	%	±%	Expenditures
Conservative	Arnold Viersen	29,486	63.02	–17.64	$61,652.70
New Democratic	Gail Ungstad	6,019	12.86	+5.34	$10,267.72
People's	Darryl Boisson	5,916	12.64	+9.59	$3,808.47
Maverick	Colin Krieger	2,573	5.50	–	$8,852.55
Liberal	Leslie Penny	2,431	5.20	–0.90	$3,859.51
Green	Jordan Francis MacDougall	364	0.78	–1.89	none listed
Total valid votes/expense limit		46,789	99.58	–	$135,210.15
Total rejected ballots		198	0.42	–0.25	
Turnout		46,987	62.08	–6.50	
Eligible voters		75,685			
Conservative hold		Swing		–11.49	
Source: Elections Canada

2019 Canadian federal election
Party	Candidate	Votes	%	±%	Expenditures
Conservative	Arnold Viersen	41,659	80.66	+11.31	$59,488.81
New Democratic	Jennifer Villebrun	3,886	7.52	–6.87	none listed
Liberal	Leslie Penny	3,148	6.10	–6.75	$5,377.60
People's	John Schrader	1,579	3.06	–	$4,989.63
Green	Peter Nygaard	1,377	2.67	+0.15	none listed
Total valid votes/expense limit		51,649	99.33	–	$130,930.83
Total rejected ballots		347	0.67	+0.33	
Turnout		51,996	68.58	+4.48	
Eligible voters		75,814			
Conservative hold		Swing		+9.09	
Source: Elections Canada

2015 Canadian federal election
Party	Candidate	Votes	%	±%	Expenditures
Conservative	Arnold Viersen	34,342	69.35	–8.46	$74,852.55
New Democratic	Cameron Alexis	7,127	14.39	+1.35	$10,844.13
Liberal	Chris Brown	6,360	12.84	+9.20	$6,504.94
Green	Sabrina Lee Levac	1,247	2.52	–1.34	none listed
Libertarian	Jeremy Sergeew	443	0.90	–	$108.02
Total valid votes/expense limit		49,519	99.66	–	$259,766.62
Total rejected ballots		170	0.34	–	
Turnout		49,689	64.10	–	
Eligible voters		77,515			
Conservative hold		Swing		–4.90	
Source: Elections Canada

2011 federal election redistributed results
Party	Vote	%
Conservative	28,986	77.81
New Democratic	4,859	21.10
Green	1,436	3.85
Liberal	1,357	3.64
Others	616	1.65

== See also ==
- List of Canadian electoral districts
- Historical federal electoral districts of Canada
