= Western Independence Party =

Canadian political party

A flag adopted by the association in 1988, representing Western Canada

The Western Independence Party (WIP) was a Canadian political party that advocated the separation of Western Canada from Canada to form a new country from the provinces of British Columbia, Alberta, Saskatchewan and Manitoba, and the Yukon and Northwest Territories.

The WIP ran eleven candidates in the 1988 federal election - one candidate in British Columbia, seven in Alberta, and three in Manitoba (although one of the Manitoba candidates appears to have withdrawn before election day). All the candidates were soundly defeated, with none garnering even 1% of the popular vote in any riding.

The party also had provincial branches in each of the four provinces. The federal wing of the Western Independence Party fell dormant and did not run any candidates in any federal elections after 1988. The party was resurrected in April 2005 at a founding convention in Strathmore, Alberta under the new name "Western Canada Party".

The WIP should not be confused with the Confederation of Regions Party, which sought greater autonomy for western Canada, but not full independence.

== Founding ==
The party was founded by a group of 150 people from across the western provinces. The WIP was formed because the group had grown dissatisfied with the direction of another western separatist party, the federal Western Canada Concept (WCC), led by a lawyer Douglas Christie of Victoria, B.C. At the party's founding convention in October 1987 in Edmonton, Fred Marshall was elected interim leader. Marshall had run for the leadership of the provincial WCC in 1984, losing to future Reform Party Member of Parliament Jack Ramsay of Camrose, Alberta. Also at the founding convention, the party adopted the "West Canada Flag" which was designed by Dexter Dombro and was chosen from a field of eight other entries.

== WIP in Alberta / Alberta Independence Party ==
Bob Lefurgey attempted to collect enough signatures to form official party status of the WIP as a provincially registered party in Alberta, but failed to obtain enough signatures. Lefurgey described his mission as separation. "It's basically to remove Alberta from confederation," said Lefurgey. "There's been an accumulation of things over time and we're in a perfect storm for separatists right now, with all the things going on – everything from immigration, gun control, equalization."

The Alberta Independence Party never achieved party status when it ran candidates in 2001 election. The AIP is experiencing a revival and strives to run candidates in the 2019 provincial election and form party status. The Separation Party of Alberta, which nominated candidates in the 2004 provincial election, promoted the cause of separation in the province but renamed itself the Alberta First Party in 2013.

In July 2018, MLA Derek Fildebrandt became leader of the party, which rebranded itself as the Freedom Conservative Party of Alberta. As a result, separatism has been removed from the platform, and instead adopting Albertan autonomism as part of the party's transformation. Lefurgey remains listed as President of the party by Elections Alberta.

The SPA issued a statement of support when the WIP of Saskatchewan was formed in 2003.

== WIP of Saskatchewan ==
The Saskatchewan branch of the party nominated candidates in the 2003 provincial election, and the 2007 provincial election, but none were elected. It continues to be an active party under the leadership of Dana Arnason, but does not intend to nominate candidates in federal elections.

== Party program ==
Party policy was adopted at the founding convention and was expanded at a policy convention in Saskatoon in April 1988.

The party's basic policy statements were the following:

1. independence as the only way Westerners could get political and economic justice;
2. the constitutional right to private property;
3. the citizen's right to a referendum on major issues including the constitution and constitutional amendments;
4. English as the official language; and
5. an elected, equal and effective Senate.

=== The party's vision of an independent Western Canada ===
1. A prosperous low tax economy.
2. Direct democracy.
3. Separation of executive powers to end Prime Ministerial dictatorship.
4. An elected accountable judiciary.
5. Equality of treatment and opportunity for all people.
6. An elected senate balancing popular representation with regional representation.
7. English as the official language.
8. A world-class medical system.
9. A justice system that stresses accountability.
10. No gun registry.
11. No Kyoto Accord.
12. Property rights guaranteed in the constitution.

== See also ==
- List of Canadian political parties
- Secessionist movements of Canada
- Western Independence Party of Manitoba
- Western Independence Party of Saskatchewan
