= Secessionist movements of Canada =

List of movements within Canada for secession

Map of North American regions with active separatist movements

There have been various movements within Canada for secession (see also: separatism).

== List ==
This list is composed of both historical and active movements for secession or autonomy.

=== Secessionist movements ===
Results of the 1995 Quebec independence referendum. 49.42% voted in favour of independence.

Alberta

- Proposed state: Alberta or part of Western Canada
  - Political party: Maverick Party, Wildrose Independence Party, Independence Party of Alberta, Republican Party of Alberta

British Columbia together with the Pacific Northwestern US (United States)

- Proposed state: Cascadia
  - Political party: BC Cascadia Party, Cascadian Independence Party

// The Maritimes: New Brunswick, Prince Edward Island, & Nova Scotia

- Ethnic group: Canadians, Acadians
  - Proposed state: Maritime Union or Acadia
    - Political party: Parti acadien

Newfoundland and Labrador

- Proposed State: Newfoundland and Labrador

Quebec

- Regional group: Québécois people
  - Proposed state: Republic of Quebec
    - Civil organization: Saint-Jean-Baptiste Society, Mouvement national des Québécois et des Québécoises (MNQ), Rassemblement pour l'indépendance du Québec (RIQ), Les Intellectuels pour la souveraineté (IPSO), Mouvement de libération nationale du Québec (MLNQ), Réseau de Résistance du Québécois (RRQ)
    - Labour union: Confédération des syndicats nationaux (CSN), Centrale des syndicats du Québec (CSQ), Fédération des travailleurs du Québec (FTQ), Union des artistes (UDA)
    - Political party: Parti Québécois, Bloc Québécois, Québec solidaire, Marxist–Leninist Party of Quebec

Saskatchewan

- Proposed state: Saskatchewan or part as Western Canada
  - Political party: Buffalo Party of Saskatchewan, Maverick Party

Vancouver Island

- Proposed state: Vancouver Island
  - Political party: Vancouver Island Party

/// Western Canada

- Proposed state: Western Canada
  - Political party: Maverick Party, Western Independence Party
    - Pressure group: Wexit

=== Autonomist movements ===
Alberta

- Proposed autonomous area: Alberta
  - Political party: Freedom Conservative Party of Alberta, Alberta Independence Party

Quebec

- Proposed autonomous area: Quebec
  - Political party: Coalition Avenir Québec, Équipe Autonomiste

== Movements seeking independence from Canada ==
=== Newfoundland and Labrador ===
Independence flag of Newfoundland and Labrador, the Newfoundland Tricolour.

There is a secessionist movement in Newfoundland and Labrador based on its unique history, and as a result of its grievances and broken promises with both the federal government and the government of Quebec. Prior to 1949, the area was a self-governing Dominion (Dominion of Newfoundland). "The root of our trouble is centred in the relationship between the two countries, between Newfoundland as a country and Canada" according to James Halley, a former lawyer involved in negotiating a deal to get Newfoundland into Canada in 1949. According to a July 2003 report, secessionism was on the rise. In 2004, a "flag flap" occurred when the premier of Newfoundland and Labrador, Danny Williams, removed all Canadian flags from government buildings and raised provincial flags instead.

The secessionist movement is most commonly associated with a flag under several names, including the "Pink, White and Green", "Flag of the Republic of Newfoundland and Labrador", or officially as the Newfoundland Tricolour.

=== Nova Scotia ===
Shortly after the Confederation of three British colonies (Nova Scotia, New Brunswick and the Province of Canada) to form the Dominion of Canada in 1867, opponents of Confederation in Nova Scotia began promoting the withdrawal of that province from the new confederation. The Anti-Confederation Party won 18 of the 19 Nova Scotia seats in the new House of Commons of Canada in the 1867 general election, and 36 of the 38 seats in the Nova Scotia legislature; however, the party was unsuccessful in achieving independence for Nova Scotia.

In 1990, just before the failure of the Meech Lake Accord, then-premier John Buchanan predicted Nova Scotia and the rest of Atlantic Canada would have to join the United States if the accord failed.

=== Quebec ===
The Quebec sovereignty movement seeks independence from Canada for the province of Quebec. This movement often seeks what has been termed "sovereignty-association", which is sovereignty for Quebec within an economic association or union with the rest of Canada. Since the Quiet Revolution, the many available options have garnered support from Quebecers.

The sovereignty movement has spawned a variety of political parties, such as the Parti Québécois, a social democratic political party at the provincial level in Quebec that has governed the province for various periods since 1976, and the Bloc Québécois, which sometimes wins the majority of seats in Quebec. This party aims to promote Quebec's sovereignty and purports to defend the interests of Quebec at the federal level of government.

The Front de libération du Québec (FLQ), was a terrorist organization in the 1960s and early 1970s that used violence to promote independence for Quebec. Although they both advocated a sovereigntist agenda, the FLQ and its violent tactics were denounced by the Parti Québécois.

Since the Quiet Revolution, sovereigntist sentiments have been stoked by the patriation of the Canadian constitution in 1982 which was introduced without the consent of the National Assembly of Quebec and by numerous failed attempts at constitutional reform, which have sought to address Quebec's distinct society. Two provincial referendums, in 1980 and 1995, rejected proposals for sovereignty, with majorities of 60% in 1980 and only 50.6% in 1995, respectively. Given the narrow federalist victory in 1995, a reference was made by the Chrétien government to the Supreme Court of Canada in 1996 regarding the legality of a unilateral secession of Quebec. This resulted in the passage of the Clarity Act in 2000.

=== Western Canada ===
Numerous political parties in the western provinces, believing there to be no other solution for stemming apparent "Western alienation" by Central Canada, have sought independence. These movements are strongest in Alberta, but lesser ones exist in Saskatchewan and Manitoba. These movements have also assumed that Canada's northern territories (Yukon, Northwest Territories, and Nunavut) would also be a part of a new Western Canadian union. Parties advocating Western separation include the Western Canada Concept, the Western Independence Party, and the Western Block Party. These parties have not achieved much success, however.

In the early 1980s, in Saskatchewan, the Unionest Party advocated the western provinces join the United States.

In 1995, Premier of Saskatchewan Roy Romanow secretly formed a committee on consequences if Quebec seceded. The most seriously studied option was strengthening Saskatchewan's relationships with other western provinces because Romanow said in 2014, Ontario would become closer to the US economically and Atlantic Canada would become "an island". Other possibilities included also seceding from Canada, and joining the US. Romanow said that predecessor Allan Blakeney had similarly studied options for Saskatchewan during the 1980 Quebec referendum.

On July 12, 2003, the Western Independence Party of Saskatchewan (WIPS) was created and registered as a Provincial Party, running candidates in 17 ridings in the 2003 Saskatchewan general election. It was de-registered in May 2019.

A poll by the Western Standard conducted from June 29, 2005, to July 5, 2005, finds 35.6% of residents of the four provinces think "Western Canadians should begin to explore the idea of forming their own country."

On January 12, 2020, the Wexit party, a party advocating for separation, was formed federally.

==== Alberta ====
The Alberta Independence Party promoted independence for the province of Alberta, either on its own or in union with the other western provinces, in the 1990s, but it is now defunct. The Separation Party of Alberta nominated 12 candidates in the 2004 Alberta provincial election. This party turned into the Freedom Conservative Party of Alberta in 2018 and the Wildrose Independence Party of Alberta in 2020.

In January 2022, the Buffalo Party of Alberta was registered as an official provincial party of Alberta. It did not want independence from Canada; however it supported more autonomy from the federal government. In early 2025, the Buffalo Party changed its name to the Republican Party of Alberta and shifted its platform more towards separating from Canada.

==== Manitoba ====
In January–February 1868, a small group of settlers declared a Republic of Caledonia, later the Republic of Manitobah, at Portage-la-Prairie in Hudson's Bay Company land that was to be incorporated into Canada. These settlers aimed to use this declaration to obtain favourable terms (for themselves) for the entry of the area into Confederation. The declaration was not recognized by Canadian or British authorities, and the republic soon collapsed.

In the 19th century, the Manitoban secessionist movement had support from the Fenians and secessionist Liberals.

==== British Columbia and Yukon ====
The Vancouver Island Party is the first secessionist movement that aims to secede from British Columbia and become a separate province by 2021, instead of leaving Canada like other secession movements.

=== Cascadia ===
The Cascadian Independence movement seeks separation from Canada and the United States.

== Other movements ==
=== Republic of Madawaska ===
The Republic of Madawaska occupied what is now the northwest corner of New Brunswick, and lies partially in Quebec and the American state of Maine. The origins of the so-called republic lie in the 1783 Treaty of Versailles, which established the border between the United States of America and the British North American colonies. The Madawaska region remained in dispute between the United Kingdom and the United States until 1842. In Canada, Madawaska was considered part of Quebec until the 1850s, when the border with New Brunswick was modified. The "Republic" is now a purely ceremonial entity.

== In popular culture ==
Occasionally regions of Canada have declared themselves to be "independent" in a non-serious, satirical or promotional way. These "movements" are taken for what they are and not considered secessionist.

=== Republic of Rathnelly ===
The Rathnelly neighbourhood in Toronto made headlines in 1967, while celebrating Canada's 100th birthday. During the celebrations, Rathnelly residents playfully declared themselves as a republic independent of Canada. To mark their independence, the "Republic of Rathnelly" elected a queen, organized a parade, and issued Republic of Rathnelly passports to everyone in the neighbourhood. The new nation conscripted all 8- to 14-year-old citizens to form a militia, known as the Rathnelly Irregulars, and armed them with 1,000 helium balloons (the Rathnelly "air force"). The "Republic of Rathnelly" continues to hold annual street parties.

== See also ==
- Movements for the annexation of Canada to the United States
- Indigenous land claims in Canada
- Iroquois
- Land Back
- Proposals for new Canadian provinces and territories
- Former colonies and territories in Canada
- Territorial evolution of Canada
- Chicano Movement
- Aztlán
- Provinces and territories of Canada
