= Peter Downing =

Albertan politician and separatist

CEO, founder of the Alberta USA foundation
- Incumbent
- Assumed office August 2020

Leader of Wexit Canada
- In office January 10, 2020 – June 23, 2020
- Preceded by: Party founded
- Succeeded by: Jay Hill

Personal details
- Born: Circa 1975 Newmarket, Ontario, Canada
- Party: Maverick; Christian Heritage

Military service
- Allegiance: Canada
- Branch/service: RCMP
- Rank: Officer

Peter Downing is a pro-US annexation Albertan separatist and the former leader of Wexit Canada, now known as the Maverick Party. Downing founded Wexit Canada in the aftermath of the 2019 Canadian federal election, which resulted in Justin Trudeau continuing as prime minister. Downing is also a former member of the Canadian Armed Forces and the Royal Canadian Mounted Police, serving from 2006 to 2015. He received a conditional discharge for uttering threats against his ex-wife in 2009. Downing stepped aside as leader of Wexit Canada in June 2020 after recruiting interim leader and former Conservative Member of Parliament Jay Hill.

Downing was previously a candidate for the Christian Heritage Party of Canada in the 2015 Canadian federal election. Downing created two organizations, Alberta Fights Back and Saskatchewan Fights Back, both of which served as vehicles for his separatist activism. Through this work he became affiliated with the Prairie Freedom Movement, later becoming their spokesperson.

In August 2020, Downing launched the Alberta USA Foundation, along with high visibility billboards in Edmonton and Ottawa, bearing the image of US President Donald Trump, asking the question, "Should Alberta join the USA?"

== Promotion of conspiracy theories ==
Downing is reported to have promoted multiple conspiracy theories including accusations that Justin Trudeau left his teaching position over sexual misconduct and that the Pierre Elliott Trudeau Foundation was secretly normalizing pedophilia.

== Electoral record ==
2015 Canadian federal election: Edmonton Mill Woods
Party	Candidate	Votes	%	±%	Expenditures
Liberal	Amarjeet Sohi	20,423	41.24	+29.52	$136,379.94
Conservative	Tim Uppal	20,331	41.06	-17.88	$126,472.41
New Democratic	Jasvir Deol	6,330	12.78	-12.61	$55,302.53
Green	Ralph McLean	1,096	2.21	-0.78	$1,671.63
Independent	Colin Stubbs	560	1.13	–	$5,091.44
Libertarian	Allen K.W. Paley	396	0.80	–	–
Christian Heritage	Peter Downing	285	0.58	–	$3,798.53
Communist	Naomi Rankin	96	0.19	–	–
Total valid votes/Expense limit		49,517	99.54		$206,234.63
Total rejected ballots		227	0.46	–	
Turnout		49,744	67.84	–	
Eligible voters		73,323			
Liberal gain from Conservative		Swing		+23.70	
These results were subject to a judicial recount, and modified from the validated results in accordance with the Judge's rulings. The margin of Sohi over Uppal increased from 79 votes to 92 votes as a result of the recount.
Source: Elections Canada
