= Western alienation =

Phenomenon in Canadian politics

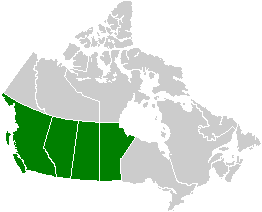
Western Canada

Western alienation, in Canadian politics, is the notion that the Western provinces—British Columbia, Alberta, Saskatchewan and Manitoba—have been marginalized within the Confederation, particularly compared to Central Canada, which consists of Canada's two most populous provinces, Ontario and Quebec. Expressions of western alienation frequently allege that Eastern Canada is politically over-represented and receives out-sized economic benefits at the expense of western Canadians.

Western alienation has a long history within Canada, dating back to the nineteenth century. It has led to the establishment of many Western regional political parties at both the provincial and federal levels and from both the right and left sides of the political spectrum, although since the 1980s, western alienation has been more closely associated with and espoused by conservative politicians. While such movements have tended to express a desire for a larger place for the west within Confederation, western alienation has at times resulted in calls for western separatism and independence. Given this long history, western alienation has had a profound impact on the development of Canadian politics.

According to a 2019 analysis by Global News, Western alienation is considered especially potent in Alberta and Saskatchewan politics. However, alienation sentiments vary over time and place. For instance, a 2010 study published by the Canada West Foundation found that such sentiments had decreased across the region in the first decade of the twenty-first century. More recently, a 2019 Ipsos poll found historically high levels of support for secession from Canada in both Alberta and Saskatchewan.

== Historical roots ==
Upon Confederation in 1867, the new Dominion of Canada consisted only of Ontario, Quebec, New Brunswick, and Nova Scotia. However, what was then known as the North-West—much of it officially Rupert's Land and owned by the Hudson's Bay Company (HBC)—was already a significant factor in Canadian plans. Among the country's founders, George Brown was particularly insistent that the North-West was the key to Canadian prosperity, offering resources, plentiful land for agricultural settlement, and the potential for a captive market for eastern manufacturers. In 1869, HBC gave up its control of Rupert's Land, which became part of Canada in 1870 under the name North-West Territories.

=== The National Policy ===
The first Canadian Prime Minister, John A. Macdonald, designed the National Policy to integrate the North-West Territories into Canada and to develop it economically as part of a Canadian economy. The key planks of the National Policy were the building of a trans-continental railway that would connect the east to British Columbia, help to settle and populate the west, and easily ship goods across the country (mostly grain and agricultural products grown in the Prairies, manufactured goods produced in central Canada); immigration to populate the Prairies with homesteaders; and tariffs to protect Canadian manufacturers. The protectionist tariffs were an immediate issue in the North-West, as they effectively forced western farmers to purchase more expensive equipment from eastern Canadian manufacturers rather than less-expensive farm equipment from manufacturers in the United States, and they impacted prices for farm products—farmers of the North-West Territories therefore favoured free trade between Canada and the U.S. This began a long battle between farmers on the prairies and the federal government and led to the establishment of farmers' organizations to help control grain shipping and marketing, and to agitate politically for free trade and economic protection for farmers as well. Eventually, farmers entered the political sphere directly, forming United Farmers parties and the Progressive Party, both of which helped to lay a foundation for a national democratic-socialist party, Co-operative Commonwealth Federation (CCF).

=== Western provinces ===
The first province established in the North-West was Manitoba, and it entered Confederation under unusual circumstances. Negotiations were instigated at the behest of the Métis at Red River, who were wary of losing their land and rights as Canada encroached upon the territory. After the quelling of the Red River Resistance, Manitoba entered Confederation as a small province—it was jokingly derided as the "postage stamp province"—with limited rights, including a lack of control over its natural resources.

British Columbia negotiated its own entry in 1871. It was better positioned than the rest of the North-West. It demanded and got a promise of the construction of a trans-continental railway.

By the turn of the twentieth century, agitation for provincehood for the rest of the North-West increased as the land settlement grew. NWT premier Frederick Haultain proposed the creation of a large province between Manitoba and British Columbia, for which he favoured the name Buffalo. However, some in the federal government, wary of creating too powerful of a province, opposed the creation of such a large province in the west. The result was the 1905 establishment of the provinces of Alberta and Saskatchewan, both of which were not given control of their resources, like Manitoba a generation earlier. To protest this, Haultain led the Provincial Rights Party in Saskatchewan from 1905 until 1912.

While each of these provinces received federal grants as compensation for this lack of resource control, it remained a significant issue until 1930, when the Natural Resources Transfer Acts finally gave those provinces control of their own resources.

=== The Great Depression ===
The Prairie provinces were by far the most impacted by the Great Depression. The economic depression was deepened on the Prairies by drought and dust bowl conditions, and all together farmers across the region were impoverished. Getting little in the way of relief from the federal government, the region was the slowest to recover from the Depression, which only passed with the arrival of the Second World War and the consequent revival in manufacturing, primarily benefiting business interests in Central Canada. The depression caused the establishment of two parties that would dominate politics in Alberta and Saskatchewan for much of the next half-century, Social Credit and the CCF, both of which drew on the legacy of the United Farmer movements. The two new parties sought to transform economic and social conditions on the Prairies, albeit from different ideological positions, and their successes contributed to a tempering of western alienation for much of the middle of the twentieth century. A related factor was an increased focus on resource development on the Prairies. This succeeded, filled provincial coffers and buoyed a recovery from the Depression.

When John Diefenbaker became prime minister as the leader of a Progressive Conservative government in 1957, this also marked a shift in western relations. Diefenbaker, hailing from Saskatchewan, considered himself an unabashed champion of western interests, and his popularity helped to align conservatism at the federal level with the needs of Prairie farmers.

=== Resource development ===
Before the Second World War, western alienation was principally rooted in a sense of being unequal in Confederation and held back in economic development—in a sense, the notion that the west was a colony of eastern Canada. This changed after the war, when the prairie provinces in particular became more prosperous, based largely on newfound resource wealth. Feelings of alienation returned in the 1970s, but by then were based principally on a sense of unjustified intrusion by the federal government into western economic interests. In part, this was an outcome of the expansion of the federal state in the postwar period, and in part this was due to the rising economic power of the prairie provinces. It had largely to do with debates over federalism versus decentralization in Canadian politics. The 1970s energy crises led to rapid increases in energy resource prices, which produced windfall profits in the energy-rich western provinces. The 1974 federal budget from Pierre Trudeau's Liberal government terminated the deduction of provincial natural resources royalties from federal tax. According to Roy Romanow—then Saskatchewan's attorney general—this move kicked off the "resource wars", a confrontation between Trudeau's federal government and the prairie provinces over the control of and revenues from natural resource extraction and energy production.

Following an increase in the world price of oil between 1979 and 1980, Trudeau's government introduced the National Energy Program (NEP), which was designed to increase Canadian ownership in the oil industry, increase Canada's oil self-sufficiency, and redistribute the wealth generated by oil production with a greater share going to the federal government. While the program was meant to mitigate the effect of higher gas prices in eastern Canada, it was extremely unpopular in the west due to the perception that the federal government was implementing unfair revenue sharing. In response, a quote from future Alberta Premier Ralph Klein—then the mayor of Calgary—featured prominently on bumper stickers in that province: "Let the eastern bastards freeze in the dark". The program was ultimately repealed in 1985.

Resource rights were prominent in negotiations of the Patriation of the Canadian Constitution in the early 1980s. Alberta and Saskatchewan premiers Peter Lougheed and Allan Blakeney negotiated to ensure that provincial resource rights were enshrined in Section 92A of the Constitution.

=== The Reform Party ===
Brian Mulroney's Progressive Conservatives replaced the Liberals with an historic majority in the 1984 election. However, Mulroney was seen as similarly neglectful of western Canada, which led to the establishment of the conservative Reform Party in 1987. Led by Preston Manning—son of former Alberta Social Credit premier Ernest Manning—Reform campaigned on the slogan "The West Wants In". Despite controversy over the party's social conservatism, it surged to third party status in 1993, winning 52 seats—all but one of them in Western Canada—in the fall election while the PCs were reduced to just 2. In the 1997 election, Reform became the Official Opposition. In 2000, Reform rebranded as the Canadian Alliance in an attempt to appeal to voters beyond Western Canada; in 2003, the party merged with the PCs to form the Conservative Party of Canada, the power base of which has since resided in the west.

== Contemporary western alienation ==
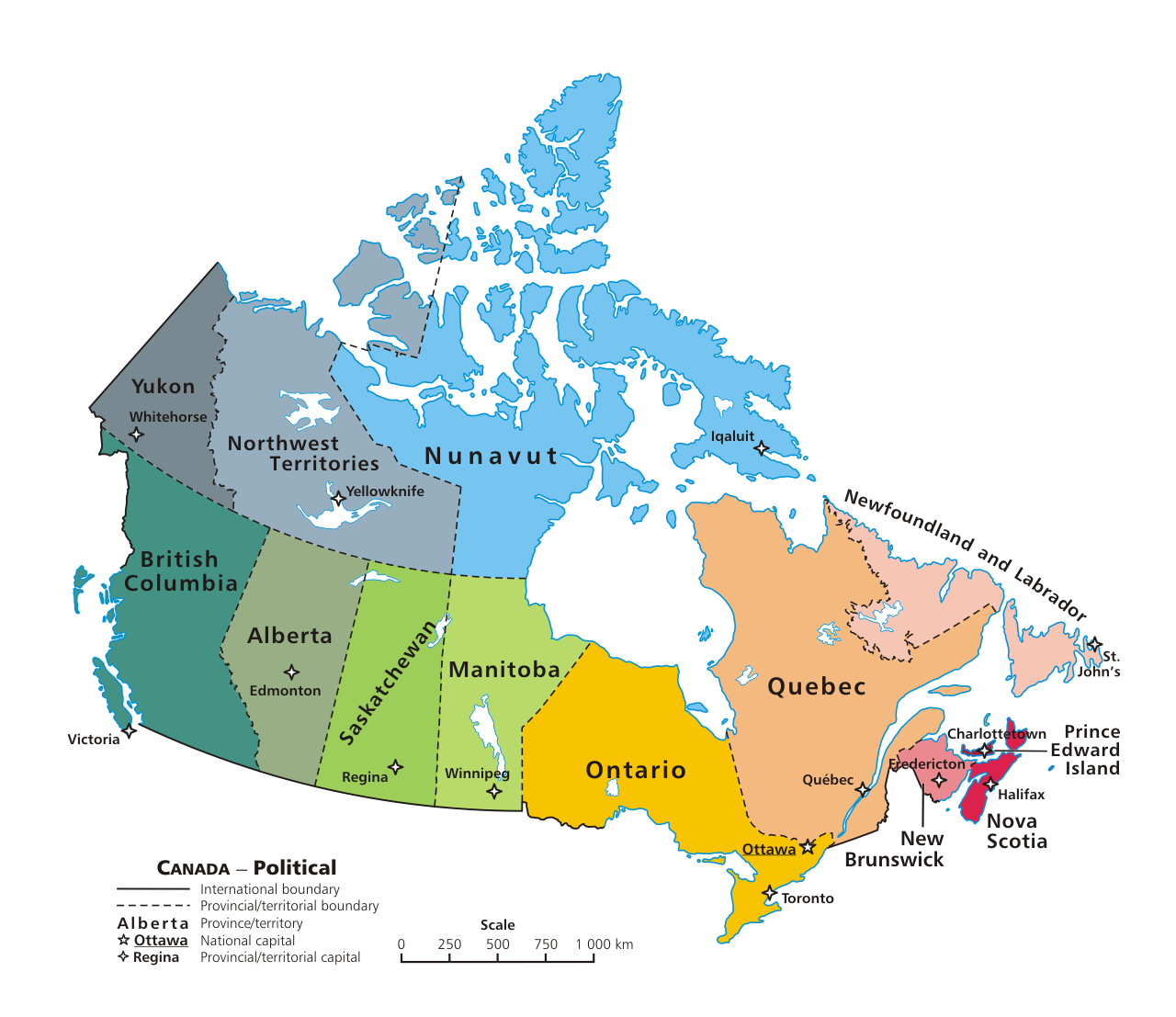
Political map of Canada

The twenty-first century has seen a resurgence of western alienation sentiments, which coincided again with the boom and bust of commodity prices. Paul Martin stated that addressing western alienation was one of his two priorities when he became prime minister in 2003. In 2007, he said he had learned that the phenomenon ebbs and flows, and by the end of that decade such sentiments were reported to have decreased. However, particularly since the 2015 election of a Liberal federal government under the leadership of Justin Trudeau—the son of Pierre Trudeau—western alienation has reached heights not seen since the 1980s. This has largely to do with perceptions of federal overreach by a governing party that has frequently been shut out of much of the Prairies. In particular, federal environmental policy and efforts at addressing climate change, such as the Pan-Canadian Framework, have been at the core of contemporary western alienation, stoking fears of a forced economic downturn for key resource industries. However, this resurgence of western alienation also coincided with a major downturn in commodity prices after 2014.

Governments in both Alberta and Saskatchewan have characterized federal environmental policy as an attack on their respective resource industries, and therefore as a threat to their provinces' economic stability. The Saskatchewan Party, especially under the leadership of Scott Moe since 2018, and since its formation in 2017 Alberta's United Conservative Party—currently under the leadership of Danielle Smith—have positioned themselves in opposition to Ottawa, and sought greater autonomy within Canada. At the same time, polling has consistently suggested that Alberta and Saskatchewan residents perceive the federal government as harmful to their province's interests. Moreover, residents in British Columbia and Manitoba have also indicated a sense of rising resentment towards Ottawa, and residents in all four western provinces indicated that they would support a new "Western Canada Party" at the federal level to advocate for the region's interests.

Also at question is the degree to which westerners identify more with their region or province than with the country. 2018 polling suggested that 76% of western Canadians felt a sense of "unique western Canadian identity", the same percentage that said so in 2001. Governments have at times contributed to such sentiments. For example, Scott Moe in 2021 called for recognition of Saskatchewan as a "nation within a nation"—drawing on terminology frequently employed by Quebec nationalists—and argued that the province has its own "cultural identity". In 2023, Saskatchewan made it mandatory for schools in the province to fly the provincial flag, which the government indicated was meant to increase pride in provincial identity.

=== Legal and policy challenges ===
The federal effort to institute a carbon tax across the country has been a significant point of contention. Saskatchewan—which was later joined by Alberta along with Ontario—challenged the constitutionality of the Greenhouse Gas Pollution Pricing Act in court. The challenge was first launched in April 2018, and in March 2021 the Supreme Court of Canada ruled that the Act is constitutional. The western provinces found some success in their constitutional challenge against federal environmental impact assessment legislation, as the Supreme Court ruled in October 2023 that portions of the 2019 Impact Assessment Act dealing with "designated projects" outside of federal jurisdiction were unconstitutional. An amended Impact Assessment Act received royal assent in June 2024.

In 2022, both Alberta and Saskatchewan passed new legislation to affirm their control over natural resources and to try and mitigate the encroachment of federal power. The Alberta Sovereignty Act and the Saskatchewan First Act were both introduced in November 2022.

Alberta and Saskatchewan have made other efforts to distance themselves from Ottawa. Both have frequently criticized the equalization payment scheme as unfair. In his call for "A New Deal with Canada", Moe has signaled a desire for more control over taxation and immigration, and Saskatchewan has introduced plans to create a provincial police force. Smith has opened discussions about Alberta withdrawing from the Canada Pension Plan and starting its own.

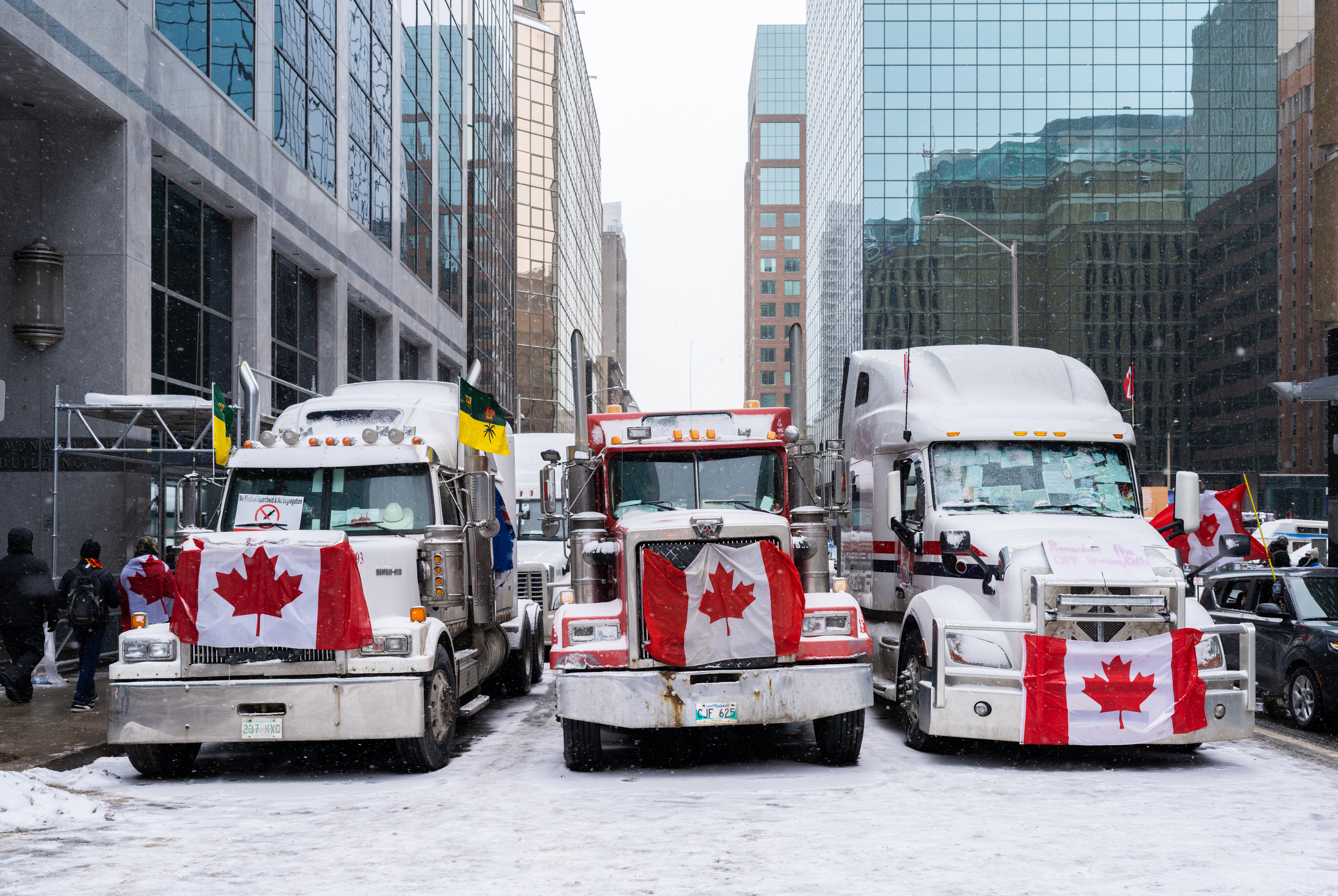
Trucks participating in the convoy protest and occupation of Ottawa in February 2022; the truck on the left is adorned with Saskatchewan flags.

=== Convoy protests ===
Since 2019, a number of popular protests have organized convoys to Ottawa to take demands directly to the federal government, something that has a long tradition in western Canada dating back to the early twentieth century, including the attempted On-to-Ottawa Trek during the Great Depression. In particular, large convoy protests in 2018 and 2022 have received international attention. The first of these convoys was organized by the "yellow vests movement", which drew inspiration from the 2018 French yellow vests protests. The Canadian protest demanded, among other things, the elimination of the federal carbon tax. The second was the self-styled "freedom convoy", which purported to be focused on protesting COVID-19 vaccine mandates, but shared many of the same organizers and resources as the 2018 protest. In both cases, the extent to which the convoys were supported by western Canadians was a subject of debate; for example, a 2022 study suggested that fewer than 20% of Albertans thought positively of the convoy protest. Moreover, several studies have indicated that these protests included a high degree of far-right political elements, including xenophobic and conspiratorial elements.

== Western separatism ==
Particularly since the 1970s, when the resource-based economies of Alberta and Saskatchewan began to see rapid growth, the idea of separatism and independence for western provinces—on their own or in some combination together—has at times gained political traction and led to the creation of new movements and parties working towards that end. Such sentiment did not arise in a vacuum, with agitation for Quebec sovereignty reaching new heights in the 1970s. The extent to which agitation for western sovereignty has merely been a "bargaining tool" for the west, as former Prime Minister Pierre Trudeau characterized it in 1980, has been debated, and western Premiers, including Peter Lougheed, have tended to downplay any push for secession. Parties advocating for western secession have tended to fare poorly at the polls.

=== 1980s ===
A Western Canadian flag adopted by the Western Independence Party in 1988.

While movements like the Reform Party stated that they were dedicated to realizing a bigger role for the west within Canada, other movements, like the Western Canada Concept, founded in 1980, argued that the west would be better off carving out its own nation, and was politically and economically capable of doing so. Although envisioned as a federal movement, Western Canada Concept never ran candidates in a federal election. However, it did field provincial branches in each of the western provinces. It found its biggest success in Alberta, where Gordon Kesler won a 1982 by-election under the WCC banner; in that year's general election, the party was one candidate short of a full slate and earned 12% of the vote, although none of its candidates were elected. During Saskatchewan's 20th Legislature, two sitting MLAs—Bill Sveinson and Lloyd Hampton—took up the WCC banner. However, the party failed to have any candidates elected in the 1986 election.

The short-lived Unionest Party in Saskatchewan offered another separatist option in that province. Former Progressive Conservative leader Dick Collver founded the party in 1980, and advocated for a secession of western provinces and a subsequent union with the United States—Unionest was a contraction of "best" and "union". This was seen as "traitorous" by some, and somewhat ironic given that one factor in Canada's acquisition of the west was to avoid its annexation by the US.

Other such movements that arose to advocate for secession include the Western Independence Party, which fielded candidates in federal and provincial elections from 1988 into the twenty-first century, and the Western Block Party.

=== Wexit (2019–) ===
Separatist sentiment began to re-emerge ahead of the 2019 federal election, with one study indicating record levels of separatist sentiment in Alberta and Saskatchewan. In the wake of the 2019 election—which saw the governing Liberal Party shut out from both Alberta and Saskatchewan—the "Wexit" movement consolidated this new wave of separatist sentiment. A play on the British "Brexit" movement, Wexit established federal and provincial branches to advocate for western secession, and adopted a reversed version of Preston Manning's slogan: "The West Wants Out". In 2020, Wexit Canada rebranded as the Maverick Party; Wexit Alberta merged with the Freedom Conservative Party to form the Wildrose Independence Party; and Wexit Saskatchewan rebranded as the Buffalo Party. Wexit BC was de-registered in 2022.

In the 2020 Saskatchewan provincial election, the Buffalo Party ran just 17 candidates but received 2.6% of the popular vote, more than any other third party, and finished second in a handful of rural ridings. The result prompted Saskatchewan Premier Scott Moe to state that his Saskatchewan Party—which handily won a majority government—"share your frustrations", and to call for more "independence" from Ottawa, although he downplayed talk of secession. Ahead of the 2021 federal election, the Maverick Party stated that it was trying to emulate the model laid out by the Bloc Québécois. However, the party failed to gain traction in the election, earning just over 1% of the vote in each of Alberta and Saskatchewan. Then-interim leader Jay Hill acknowledged after the election that focusing on separatism created "a certain degree of discomfort with most westerners who aren’t prepared at this point to go that far." Although Maverick did not officially endorse the 2022 convoy protest that occupied Ottawa, many of its members supported it and one of the party's secretaries, Tamara Lich, was a key convoy organizer. The party ultimately lost momentum and was de-registered in 2025. There are also signs of the movement losing traction in Saskatchewan. After its surprising 2020 performance, the Buffalo Party fell to sixth place in the 2024 provincial election, earning less than 1% of the popular vote.

In the wake of the 2025 Canadian federal election, which resulted in the Liberal Party being re-elected to a fourth term, this time under the leadership of Mark Carney, United Conservative Party members reignited agitation for Alberta separatism. The day after the election, Danielle Smith introduced legislative changes to make it easier for citizens to trigger a referendum. This helped lead to the 2026 Alberta independence referendum, which will be part of the 2026 Alberta referendum slated to take place on 19 October 2026.

=== Impact of Quebec separatism ===
It was revealed in 2014 that Roy Romanow's New Democratic Party government in Saskatchewan held secret meetings to discuss contingencies for the event of a successful secession vote in the 1995 Quebec referendum, including the possibility of following suit and potentially courting annexation by the United States. Romanow stated that Allan Blakeney had held similar discussions ahead of the 1980 Quebec referendum. He further explained that, in his view, secession for Saskatchewan "would not make sense economically and socially".

== Responses to western alienation ==
=== Federal government ===
In the 1980s, Pierre Trudeau called talk of western alienation and separatism a "bargaining tool" for the west, and urged the west to find ways to get more representation in the federal government. For his part, given the lack of Liberal representation in the west—his party won only two seats west of Ontario, both of them in Manitoba—Trudeau took the uncommon step of appointing western senators to his cabinet.

Amidst criticism that the federal government was inhibiting pipeline development, Justin Trudeau's Liberals purchased the Trans Mountain pipeline in 2018 to try and help ensure the completion of its expansion project, which before and after was mired in financial uncertainty. Mark Carney's government entered direct negotiations with Danielle Smith's Alberta government, and in 2026 announced a memorandum of understanding and agreements on climate and energy policies, including a carbon price plan and a framework for new pipeline development.

=== First Nations ===
First Nations leaders have often asserted that they have been forgotten in discussions of western alienation. Given that First Nations in Canada have direct relationships with the federal government, and the large number of First Nations in western Canada, such assertions complicate those discussions. This is particularly true in British Columbia, where a large number of First Nations have never entered into treaty agreements with the federal government.

In recent years, Indigenous leaders have pushed back against talk of western alienation, particularly talk of western separatism. In 2019, Assembly of First Nations National Chief Perry Bellegarde said that First Nations consent would be required for any secession, given that "provincial boundaries came after treaty territories", further adding that western leaders "have to be careful when you go down that road of Western alienation... We have inherent rights... and those are international agreements with the Crown." Saskatoon Tribal Council Chief Marc Arcand added that any western province "does not have the authority to decide if they want to separate". First Nations chiefs from Treaty 8 territory also released a statement in 2019, declaring that they were "strongly opposed to the idea of separation from Canada." In 2025, two First Nations chiefs in Alberta again pushed back against separatist rhetoric, addressing a letter to Danielle Smith, urging the Premier to respect Treaty rights and stop stoking separatist sentiments. In 2026, several First Nations took Alberta to court to stop its independence referendum petition, with the court ruling that the petition represented a failure of the province's duty to consult. After Alberta opted to proceed with the referendum despite the ruling, numerous First Nations leaders, calling the decision "lawless," stated a willingness to participate in acts of civil disobedience to stop the referendum.

First Nations leaders were similarly vocal in their opposition to the 2022 Alberta Sovereignty and Saskatchewan First Acts, arguing that they infringe on treaty rights and circumvent their relationship with the Crown. Both Acts were drafted without consultation with Indigenous communities.

== Political parties ==
The following is a list of federal and provincial political parties that were founded in response to western alienation, to advance western interests within Canada, or to promote western independence. Some such parties, like the CCF and Reform, have merged with other entities to become truly national parties.

Party name	Founded	Level	Political position	Notes
Provincial Rights Party	1905	Provincial (SK)	Right-wing	Advocated for equal rights for the province within Confederation. Became the provincial Conservative Party in 1912.
United Farmers	1919	Provincial	Left-wing	Agrarian parties that formed government in Alberta (1921) and Manitoba (1922); also formed government in Ontario (1919). Parties played roles in forming the Progressive Party and CCF.
Progressive Party	1920	Federal/provincial	Left-wing	Outgrowth of the agrarian United Farmers movement. Won the second most seats in the 1921 election, but declined to form the Official Opposition
Co-operative Commonwealth Federation	1932	Federal/provincial	Left-wing	Democratic socialist party formed out of a union of labour and agrarian interests. Formed government in Saskatchewan in 1944. Merged with Canadian Labour Congress in 1961 to form the NDP.
Social Credit Party	1935	Federal/provincial	Right-wing	A mix of social credit monetary reform theory and Christian right social conservatism. Formed government in Alberta in 1935.
Western Canada Concept	1980	Federal/provincial	Right-wing	Separatist party.
Unionest Party	1980	Provincial (SK)	Right-wing	Advocated for Western Canada to join the United States.
Alberta Party	1985	Provincial (AB)	Centrist	Originally a separatist party; especially since 2009, seen as centrist and Alberta-focused.
Reform Party	1987	Federal	Right-wing	Populist party with Christian right influences. In 2000, became Canadian Alliance, and in 2003 merged with the Progressive Conservatives to form the modern Conservative Party.
Western Independence Party	1988	Federal/provincial	Right-wing	Separatist party.
Saskatchewan Party	1997	Provincial (SK)	Right-wing	Although initially focused on Saskatchewan politics, especially since 2015 seen as increasingly focused on provincial independence.
Alberta First Party	1999	Provincial (AB)	Right-wing	Separatist party. In 2018, rebranded as the Freedom Conservative Party, which in 2020 merged with Wexit Alberta to form the Wildrose Independence Party.
Western Block Party	2005	Federal	Right-wing	Separatist party.
Wildrose Party	2007	Provincial (AB)	Right-wing	Autonomist party. In 2017, merged with the Progressive Conservative Party to create the United Conservative Party.
Independence Party	2017	Provincial (AB)	Right-wing	Separatist party.
Maverick Party	2020	Federal	Right-wing	Originally Wexit Canada. Separatist party.
Buffalo Party	2020	Provincial (SK)	Right-wing	Originally Wexit Saskatchewan. Separatist party.
Wildrose Independence Party	2020	Provincial (AB)	Right-wing	Originally Wexit Alberta and the Freedom Conservative Party. Separatist party.
Republican Party	2022	Provincial (AB)	Right-wing	Originally Buffalo Party of Alberta. Pro-American party.
Wildrose Loyalty Coalition	2023	Provincial (AB)	Right-wing	Separatist party.

== See also ==
- Alberta separatism
- Cascadia movement
- Maritime Rights Movement
- Secessionist movements of Canada
