= Western Independence Party of Manitoba =

Political party in the province of Manitoba, Canada

The Western Independence Party of Manitoba was a political party in the province of Manitoba, Canada. It was formed in 1987 by Fred Cameron, formerly the leader of the province's Western Canada Concept. It is unclear if the Manitoba WIP was simply a renamed WCC or an entirely new organization. The Manitoba WCC seems to have disappeared soon after the WIP's founding.

Like the WCC, the WIP promoted independence and nationhood for Canada's four western provinces (Manitoba, Saskatchewan, Alberta and British Columbia). The Manitoba branch of the party participated in the province's 1988 and 1990 elections, with Cameron as its leader.

The WIP ran 16 candidates in the 1988 election, considerably more than the five run by the WCC in the 1986 election. Cameron ran against Gary Doer in the north Winnipeg riding of Concordia, and received 114 votes. No WIP candidate came close to being elected.

The WIP ran six candidates in the 1990 election. Cameron again ran against Doer, this time receiving 168 votes. Once again, no WIP candidate came close to being elected.

The party was still registered with Elections Manitoba in the 1995 election, but did not run any candidates. In 2003, a Canadian Broadcasting Corporation report on the Saskatchewan WIP made reference to the Manitoba party's continued existence. It has not participated in any elections since 1990, however.

== See also ==
- Western Independence Party
- List of Canadian political parties
