= Western Independence Party of Saskatchewan =

- Leader: Neil Fenske
- Founded: July 12, 2003
- Dissolved: May 10, 2019
- Headquarters: Endeavour, Saskatchewan
- Ideology: Saskatchewanian independence; Libertarianism; Decentralization; Economic liberalism
- Political position: Right-wing
- Seats in Legislature: 0 / 61

The Western Independence Party of Saskatchewan (WIP of Saskatchewan or WIP-SK) was a provincial political party in Saskatchewan, Canada. It advocated for the independence of Saskatchewan and libertarian ideals. The party leader was Neil Fenske. WIP-SK was not affiliated with any federal party.

== History ==
The WIP of Saskatchewan was formed on July 12, 2003, and nominated 17 candidates for the November 5, 2003 provincial election. These candidates won a total of 2,735 votes, or 0.64% of the provincial total.

The first party president was Frank Serfas, and the first deputy leader was David Sawkiw. The party nominated eight candidates for the 2007 election, two in the 2011 election, and four in the 2016 election.

The party was not affiliated with the Western Canada Concept Party of British Columbia or the British Columbia-based Western Block Party, and has made considerable effort to distance itself from Doug Christie, the leader of those parties. Whereas Christie has been mired in controversy for defending Holocaust deniers and has been accused of being an anti-Semite, the WIP of Saskatchewan has made an explicit statement in support of Israel. The WIP of Saskatchewan also has no ties with the Separation Party of Alberta, the Western Canada Party, or the Alberta Independence Party.

=== De-registration ===
The party was formally de-registered by Elections Saskatchewan on May 10, 2019. The party had missed the deadline to report their election expenses related to the 2018 Regina Northeast by-election. According to Fenske, missing the dealine was an "oversight" and the party had been lacking the manpower to function as a proper party for a few years. The party was also dealing with internal divisions. Indeed, some members who were disappointed by Fenske's non-commitment to Western separatism had attempted to oust him as leader in the months prior to the party's de-registration.

== Ideology ==
The WIP of Saskatchewan's platform was libertarian and secular in nature, a distinguishing feature from some of the other separatist parties in Western Canada. It supported economic liberalism and socially moderate policies. Though the party was originally established with a pro-independence stance, in its final years it had focused less on separatism and has instead advocated for strengthened political power at the federal level for Saskatchewan, to combat the perceived notion of Western alienation.

== See also ==
- Buffalo Party of Saskatchewan
