= Arnold Viersen =

Canadian politician

Arnold Viersen MP
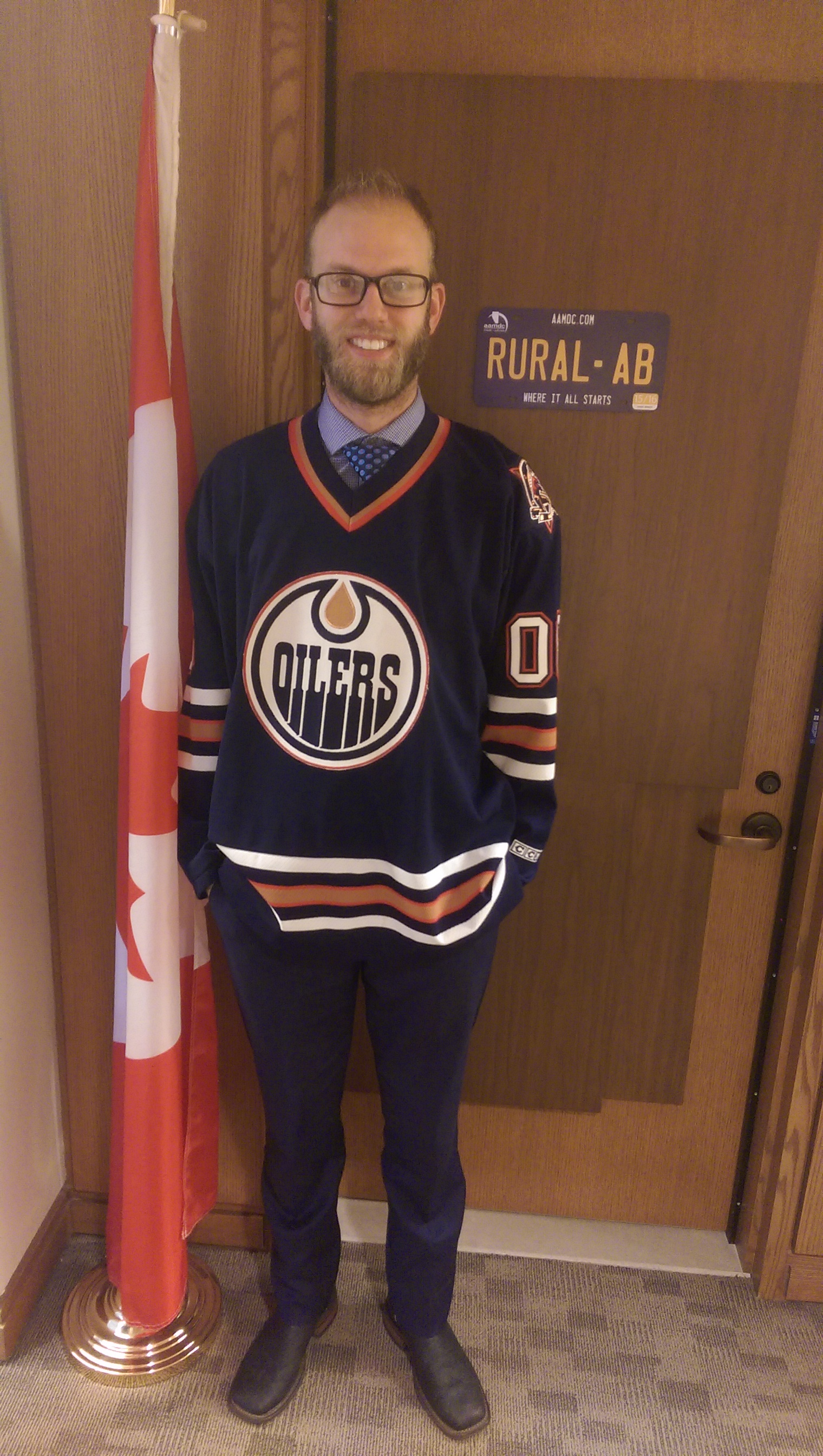

Member of Parliament for Peace River—Westlock
- Incumbent
- Assumed office October 19, 2015
- Preceded by: Riding Created

Personal details
- Born: May 3, 1986 (age 40) Barrhead, Alberta, Canada
- Party: Conservative
- Spouse: Melissa Bredenhof (m. 2011)
- Children: 7 as of now
- Profession: Mechanic

Arnold Viersen MP (born May 3, 1986) is a Canadian Conservative politician who was elected to represent the riding of Peace River—Westlock in the 2015 Canadian federal election. He identifies as a social conservative.

== Background ==
Viersen attended Covenant Canadian Reformed School in Neerlandia from Grade 1 through Grade 12, and currently resides near his childhood home on an acreage in Westlock County. Before entering politics, Viersen worked as a journeyman auto mechanic.

== Career ==
In the 42nd Canadian Parliament, Viersen served on the Indigenous and Northern Affairs Committee, and was named the Official Opposition's Deputy Critic of Rural Affairs. On December 8, 2016, Viersen's Private Member's Motion (M-47) received unanimous consent in the House of Commons. The official text of this motion reads: "That the Standing Committee on Health be instructed to examine the public health effects of the ease of access and viewing of online violent and degrading sexually explicit material on children, women and men, recognizing and respecting the provincial and territorial jurisdictions in this regard, and that the said Committee report its findings to the House no later than July 2017." The Health Committee's ensuing study was the first Government of Canada study into the public health effects of pornography since 1985.

In June 2022, after the Supreme Court of the United States decision in Dobbs v. Jackson Women's Health Organization overturned abortion rights from Roe v. Wade, Viersen celebrated the ruling on Facebook, calling abortion in Canada the "greatest human rights tragedy of our time." On May 6, 2024, Viersen put forward a petition calling for the government to restrict abortion.

In a June 2024 interview on Liberal MP Nathaniel Erskine-Smith's podcast, Viersen said that he would vote against abortion, gay marriage, and cannabis legalization. Afterward Viersen, released a statement that those stances were his alone, and party leader Pierre Poilievre said that they were not reflective of the party's stance. In addition, Viersen stated that he felt ambushed by Erskine-Smith's questions in which Erskine-Smith disputed by stating Viersen's stances on those issues are well known.

== Electoral record ==
2025 Canadian federal election: Peace River—Westlock
Party	Candidate	Votes	%	±%	Expenditures
Conservative	Arnold Viersen	41,130	77.07	+14.42	$46,167.37
Liberal	Luke Markowski	6,278	11.76	+6.28	$3,870.20
Independent	Darrell Teske	3,048	5.71	–	$3,401.45
New Democratic	Landen Tischer	2,913	5.46	–7.70	$3,117.39
Total valid votes/expense limit		53,369	99.26	–	$159,831.97
Total rejected ballots		398	0.74	+0.32	
Turnout		53,767	64.96	+2.88	
Eligible voters		82,772			
Conservative hold		Swing		+11.06	
Source: Elections Canada

2019 Canadian federal election: Peace River—Westlock
Party	Candidate	Votes	%	±%	Expenditures
Conservative	Arnold Viersen	41,659	80.66	+11.31	$59,488.81
New Democratic	Jennifer Villebrun	3,886	7.52	–6.87	none listed
Liberal	Leslie Penny	3,148	6.10	–6.75	$5,377.60
People's	John Schrader	1,579	3.06	–	$4,989.63
Green	Peter Nygaard	1,377	2.67	+0.15	none listed
Total valid votes/expense limit		51,649	99.33	–	$130,930.83
Total rejected ballots		347	0.67	+0.33	
Turnout		51,996	68.58	+4.48	
Eligible voters		75,814			
Conservative hold		Swing		+9.09	
Source: Elections Canada

2015 Canadian federal election: Peace River—Westlock
Party	Candidate	Votes	%	±%	Expenditures
Conservative	Arnold Viersen	34,342	69.35	–8.46	$74,852.55
New Democratic	Cameron Alexis	7,127	14.39	+1.35	$10,844.13
Liberal	Chris Brown	6,360	12.84	+9.20	$6,504.94
Green	Sabrina Lee Levac	1,247	2.52	–1.34	none listed
Libertarian	Jeremy Sergeew	443	0.90	–	$108.02
Total valid votes/expense limit		49,519	99.66	–	$259,766.62
Total rejected ballots		170	0.34	–	
Turnout		49,689	64.10	–	
Eligible voters		77,515			
Conservative hold		Swing		–4.90	
Source: Elections Canada
