= Western Block Party =

- Former federal party
- Founded: December 29, 2005
- Dissolved: January 31, 2014
- Ideology: Western Separatism; Conservatism; Republicanism
- Colours: Mint green, baby blue, periwinkle, cream, white

The Western Block Party (WBP) was a federal political party in Canada, founded in 2005 by Doug Christie. The party was registered on December 29, 2005, and deregistered on January 31, 2014.

== Platform ==
The aim of the party was to promote the independence of Western Canada (British Columbia, Alberta, Saskatchewan, and Manitoba) from the rest of Canada.

== History ==
The party's founding convention was held on November 20, 2005, in Sidney, British Columbia. Christie was unanimously confirmed as leader. A constitution was adopted and a full slate of officers were elected.

Western independence movements typically attract support from westerners who believe that western Canada does not get a fair deal within the federal Canadian confederation. The Western Block Party's claims attracted members of differing economic views opposed to what they viewed as a corrupt federal government.

The party fielded four candidates in the 2006 federal election, including its leader, Doug Christie, who ran in the riding of Esquimalt—Juan de Fuca in British Columbia; none were elected. In the 2008 election, the party unsuccessfully ran one candidate, Patricia O'Brien, in Saanich—Gulf Islands. In both these elections the party's total vote count was second fewest of all parties. The party ran four candidates in the 2011 federal election, improving its standing only to third fewest due to a new party taking the second fewest standing.

Christie was also the leader of the Western Canada Concept Party of British Columbia, a political party that promotes separation at the provincial political level in British Columbia.

Christie was a lawyer in Canada who is well known for representing Ernst Zündel, among others. The Western Canada Concept (WCC) and WBP are not affiliated with the Separation Party of Alberta (SPA) or the Western Independence Party of Saskatchewan (WIPS). Officials in these parties have distanced themselves from Christie. The WIPS is currently attempting to establish a separate federal party, which would be called the Western Canada Party. Christie died on March 11, 2013; Paul St. Laurent was subsequently appointed interim leader.

The party was deregistered by Elections Canada in January 2014 for failing to declare at least 250 members.

== Election results ==
Election	# of candidates	# of votes	% of popular vote	% in ridings contested
2006	4	1,094	0.007%	0.46%
2008	1	195	0.00%	0.30%
2011	4	751	0.005%	0.33%

In the 2006 election, the party ran four candidates and received 1,094 votes, which was 0.0074% of the total votes cast, or 0.46% of the votes in those four electoral districts. The four candidates, their total votes, and percentages were:

- Robert Peter Kratchmer (Vegreville—Wainwright) 433 (0.8%)
- Douglas Christie (Esquimalt—Juan de Fuca) 270 (0.5%)
- Patricia O'Brien (Saanich—Gulf Islands) 183 (0.3%)
- Bruce Burnett (Victoria) 208 (0.3%)

The party ran a sole candidate, Patricia O'Brien, in 2008 and four candidates in 2011 including far right anti-immigration activist Paul Fromm, an Ontario resident, who ran in Calgary Southeast.

2011 Election candidate	Electoral District	# of votes	% of popular vote	Place
Paul Fromm	Calgary Southeast	193	0.31	6/6
Paul St. Laurent	Edmonton—Sherwood Park	222	0.40	6/6
Clive Edwards	Chilliwack—Fraser Canyon	180	0.37	5/6
Allan Holt	West Vancouver—Sunshine Coast—Sea to Sky Country	156	0.25	7/9

== See also ==
- List of political parties in Canada
- Secessionist movements of Canada
