= Jay Hill (politician) =

Canadian politician (born 1952)

The Honourable Jay Hill PC
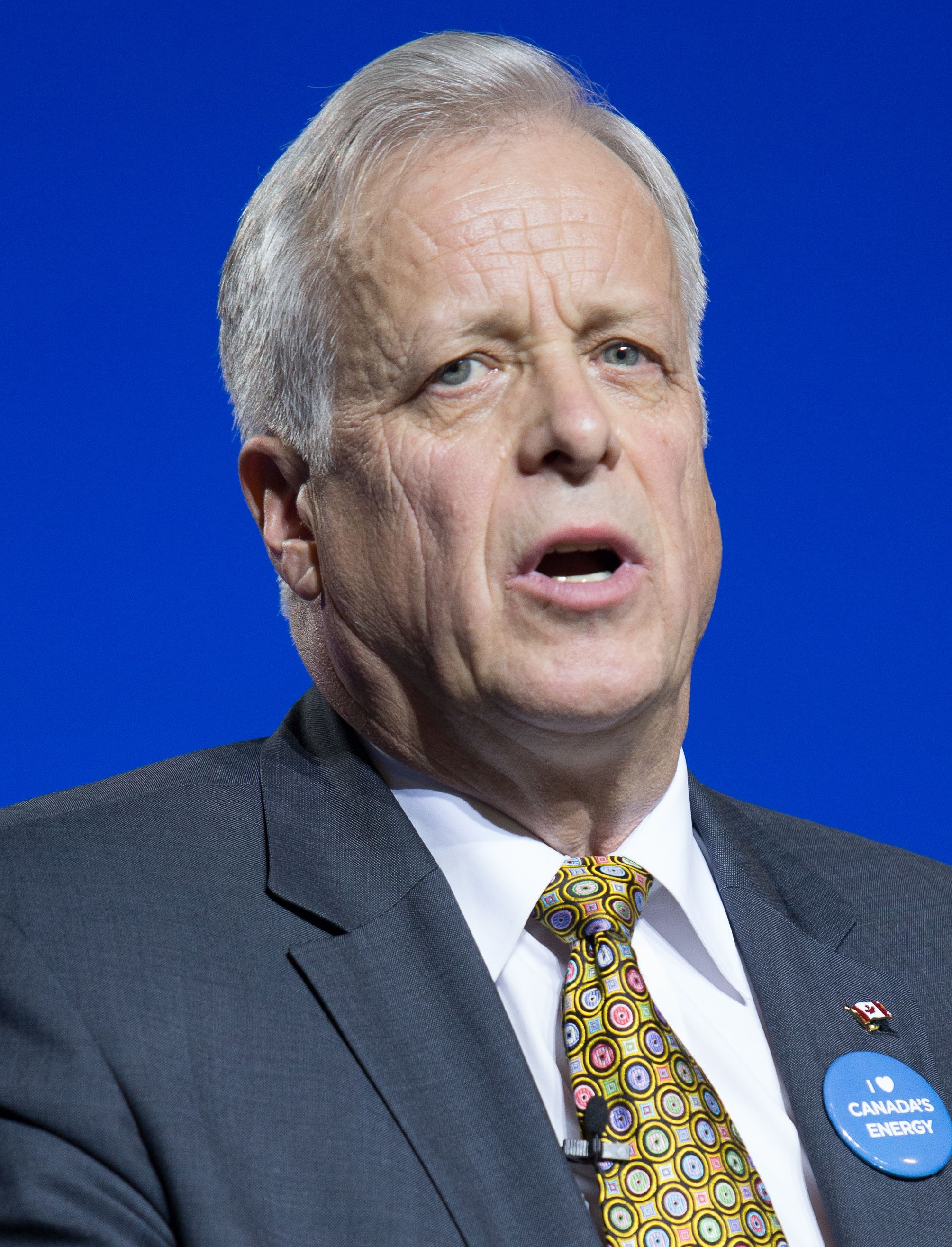

Interim Leader of the Maverick Party
- In office June 23, 2020 – May 14, 2022
- Preceded by: Peter Downing
- Succeeded by: Colin Krieger

Leader of the Government in the House of Commons
- In office October 30, 2008 – August 6, 2010
- Preceded by: Peter Van Loan
- Succeeded by: John Baird

Minister of State Chief Government Whip
- In office February 16, 2006 – October 30, 2008
- Preceded by: Karen Redman
- Succeeded by: Gordon O'Connor

Member of Parliament for Prince George—Peace River
- In office October 25, 1993 – October 25, 2010
- Preceded by: Frank Oberle Sr.
- Succeeded by: Bob Zimmer

Personal details
- Born: Jay D. Hill; December 27, 1952 (age 73) Fort St. John, British Columbia, Canada
- Party: Maverick (2020–2025)
- Other political affiliations: Reform (1993–2000); Canadian Alliance (2000–2001, 2002–2003); Democratic Representative Caucus (2001–2002); Conservative (2003–2020)
- Spouse: Leah Murray
- Profession: Farmer

Jay D. Hill PC (born December 27, 1952) is a Canadian politician who served as the Conservative Member of Parliament (MP) for the riding of Prince George—Peace River in British Columbia from 1993 to 2010. He served as Government House Leader in the House of Commons during his tenure (2008–2010). On July 21, 2010, Hill announced that he would be retiring at the May 2011 federal election. In October 2010, he announced he would retire on October 25, 2010. He recently served as the interim leader of the Maverick Party from 2020 to 2022.

One of Hill's private members bills resulted in the Adoption Expense Tax Credit, introduced in the 2005 federal budget. His bill called for tax breaks for couples who adopt children.

Hill retired from politics on October 25, 2010.

== Ethics violations ==
Shortly after his retirement, Hill was found to have breached ethics rules in the Conflict of Interest Act when took advantage of his previous position and contacted ex-colleagues about a forthcoming multinational energy deal. Canada's federal ethics watchdog found that Hill used his former position to facilitate access to the ministers on behalf of his spouse, Leah Murray, and her employer, National Public Relations, a firm that had drafted a communications plan for the deal.

== Western Canadian separatism ==
On June 23, 2020, it was announced that following a Zoom conference, Hill was selected as the new leader of the Wexit Canada Party, a political party that has as its stated goal the creation of an independent country in Western Canada. The party's name was later changed to the Maverick Party in September.

== Electoral history ==
2008 Canadian federal election: Prince George—Peace River
Party	Candidate	Votes	%	±%	Expenditures
Conservative	Jay Hill	22,325	63.59	+3.71	$34,524.65
New Democratic	Betty Bekkering	6,170	17.58	+0.54	$7,130.86
Green	Hilary Crowley	3,656	10.41	+4.02	$7,104.99
Liberal	Lindsay Gidney	2,954	8.41	–7.32	$4,661.31
Total valid votes/expense limit		35,105	99.65	–	$102,072.74
Total rejected ballots		125	0.35	+0.08	
Turnout		35,230	48.89	–4.46	
Eligible voters		72,063			
Conservative hold		Swing		+1.56	
Source: Elections Canada

2006 Canadian federal election: Prince George—Peace River
Party	Candidate	Votes	%	±%	Expenditures
Conservative	Jay Hill	22,412	59.89	+1.17	$43,206.76
New Democratic	Malcolm James Crockett	6,377	17.04	–3.65	$8,788.30
Liberal	Nathan Bauder	5,889	15.74	+1.97	$3,983.34
Green	Hilary Crowley	2,394	6.40	+0.68	$5,383.82
Independent	Donna Young	351	0.94	–	$589.17
Total valid votes/expense limit		37,423	99.73	–	$94,407.91
Total rejected ballots		103	0.27	–0.17	
Turnout		37,526	53.35	–0.22	
Eligible voters		70,345			
Conservative hold		Swing		+2.41	
Source: Elections Canada

2004 Canadian federal election: Prince George—Peace River
Party	Candidate	Votes	%	±%	Expenditures
Conservative	Jay Hill	21,281	58.71	–17.04	$52,598.50
New Democratic	Michael Hunter	7,501	20.70	+0.00	$11,997.27
Liberal	Arleene Thorpe	4,988	13.76	–1.77	$14,841.47
Green	Hilary Crowley	2,073	5.72	+3.55	$1,480.87
Canadian Action	Harley J. Harasym	301	0.83	–0.81	$1,028.45
Marxist–Leninist	Tara Rimstad	101	0.28	+0.05	none listed
Total valid votes/expense limit		36,245	99.56	–	$90,888.47
Total rejected ballots		162	0.45	+0.10	
Turnout		36,407	53.56	–3.09	
Eligible voters		67,970			
Conservative hold		Swing		–16.54	
Change for the Conservatives is based on the totals of the Canadian Alliance and the Progressive Conservatives.
Source: Elections Canada

2000 Canadian federal election: Prince George—Peace River
Party	Candidate	Votes	%	±%	Expenditures
Alliance	Jay Hill	23,840	69.62	+2.70	$47,199
Liberal	Arleene Thorpe	5,319	15.53	–1.54	$22,183
Progressive Conservative	Jan Christiansen	2,103	6.14	+0.40	$4,980
New Democratic	Lenart Nelson	1,597	4.66	–4.32	$4,329
Green	Hilary Crowley	744	2.17	+0.88	$1,306
Canadian Action	Henry A. Dunbar	562	1.64	–	$2,640
Marxist–Leninist	Colby Nicholson	80	0.23	–	$8
Total valid votes		34,245	99.66		
Total rejected ballots		118	0.34	+0.03	
Turnout		34,363	56.65	–0.90	
Eligible voters		60,658			
Alliance hold		Swing		+2.12	
Change for the Canadian Alliance is based on the Reform Party.
Source: Elections Canada

1997 Canadian federal election: Prince George—Peace River
Party	Candidate	Votes	%	±%	Expenditures
Reform	Jay Hill	22,270	66.91	+10.53	$48,148
Liberal	Barb Shirley	5,683	17.08	–2.44	$23,330
New Democratic	Alex Michalos	2,989	8.98	–2.01	$14,819
Progressive Conservative	Charles Lugosi	1,911	5.74	–5.53	$16,754
Green	Julie Zammuto	429	1.29	–	$450
Total valid votes		33,282	99.69		
Total rejected ballots		105	0.31	–0.20	
Turnout		33,387	57.55	–5.96	
Eligible voters		58,015			
Reform hold		Swing		+6.49	
Source: Elections Canada

1993 Canadian federal election: Prince George—Peace River
Party	Candidate	Votes	%	±%
Reform	Jay Hill	20,775	56.39	+41.93
Liberal	Jacques Monlezun	7,191	19.52	+7.60
Progressive Conservative	Ted Sandhu	4,153	11.27	–28.33
New Democratic	Alan Timberlake	4,051	11.00	–22.29
Natural Law	Robert Walker	295	0.80	–
Christian Heritage	John Van Der Woude	199	0.54	–
Commonwealth of Canada	Dorothy Folk	116	0.31	–
Independent	Archie Tannock	63	0.17	–
Total valid votes		36,843	99.49	
Total rejected ballots		190	0.51	+0.14
Turnout		37,033	63.50	–8.28
Eligible voters		58,316		
Reform gain from Progressive Conservative		Swing		+17.16
Source: Elections Canada

1988 Canadian federal election: Prince George—Peace River
Party	Candidate	Votes	%	±%
Progressive Conservative	Frank Oberle Sr.	13,903	39.60	–22.84
New Democratic	Alan Timberlake	11,684	33.28	+9.17
Reform	Jay Hill	5,077	14.46	–
Liberal	Jacques Monlezun	4,183	11.92	+1.97
Independent	Howard Karpes	169	0.48	–
Confederation of Regions	Lorne W. Backus	89	0.25	–0.74
Total valid votes		35,105	99.62	
Total rejected ballots		133	0.38	+0.09
Turnout		35,238	71.79	+2.83
Eligible voters		49,087		
Progressive Conservative hold		Swing		–16.00
Source: Elections Canada

28th Canadian Ministry (2006–2015) – Cabinet of Stephen Harper
Cabinet post (1)
Predecessor	Office	Successor
Peter Van Loan	Leader of the Government in the House of Commons; 2008–2010	John Baird
Sub-Cabinet Post
Predecessor	Title	Successor
Karen Redman	Minister of State (2007–2008) (Also served as Chief Government Whip)	Gordon O'Connor
