= Maverick Party =

Canadian political party

- Defunct federal party
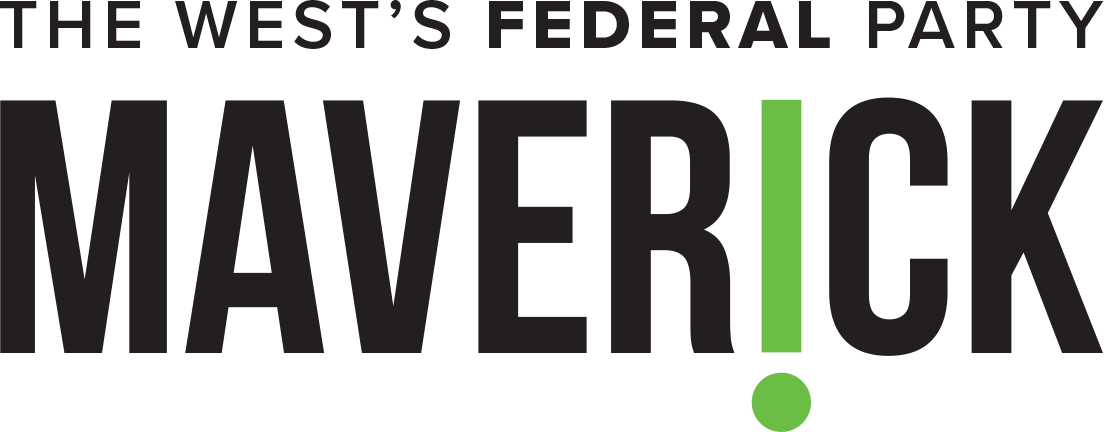
- Leader: Colin Krieger
- President: Chuck Toney
- Deputy leader: Allan Kerpan (interim)
- Founder: Peter Downing
- Founded: January 10, 2020
- Dissolved: February 28, 2025
- Headquarters: Calgary, Alberta, Canada
- Ideology: Western separatism; Conservatism; Economic liberalism; Provincial autonomy
- Political position: Right-wing to far-right
- Colours: Green
- Senate: 0 / 105
- House of Commons: 0 / 338

Website
- maverickparty.ca

The Maverick Party, formerly known as Wexit Canada, is a defunct Canadian federal political party. It advocated for constitutional changes to benefit, or the independence of, Western Canada, which includes British Columbia, Alberta, Saskatchewan, Manitoba, Yukon, Northwest Territories and Nunavut. The party had its roots in Alberta separatism and advocates the use of grassroots politics.

The party ran candidates across the aforementioned provinces and three territories in the 2021 Canadian federal election, but did not run candidates in ridings where there was a strong possibility of electing a Liberal or New Democratic candidate.

The party was led by former Conservative Party of Canada House leader Jay Hill since the resignation of the party's first leader, Peter Downing. Hill came out of retirement to act as interim leader of the Maverick Party until the election of a new leader. Hill has said that he wants the party to serve a purpose in Western Canada similar to what the Bloc Québécois has done for Quebec.

On May 14, 2022 Colin Krieger was elected party leader, succeeding Jay Hill.

The party was deregistered by Elections Canada on February 28, 2025.

== History ==
The Wexit movement gained traction in October 2019, shortly after the 2019 Canadian federal election, when the Liberal Party under Prime Minister Justin Trudeau was re-elected to form government. In August 2019, Wexit Alberta held several meetings including a small summer meeting in Calgary's beltline. A few months later another meeting in Calgary drew about 1,700 attendees.

On January 10, 2020, the party became "eligible for registration" under section 387 of the Canada Elections Act. At the time, it recorded with Elections Canada under the name "Wexit Canada". The following day, the party conducted a protest in Edmonton, involving approximately 100 supporters.

In early 2020, Wexit Alberta started purchasing billboards in Alberta criticizing Prime Minister Trudeau for various things such as "ISIS terrorist reintegration", "tax theft", "economic sabotage", "foreign interference" and "ethics violations". This sparked public discussion over the lack of representation in western Canada for some, and criticism of the billboards themselves for others. Signpatico, an advertising agency based in Regina, that installed the billboards, promised to vet ads more carefully in the future stating that while the company "fundamentally stand[s] by freedom of expression, as per the Charter", Signpatico is not "intending on inciting perceptions of hate speech or offensive ads."

In September 2020, Hill announced that the party had changed its name to the "Maverick Party". When the party changed its name, its records with Elections Canada were updated. It remains eligible for registration when an election is called.

On September 20, 2021, the party ran in the 2021 Canadian federal election for the first time since its founding in 2020. They lost the election with only 1 to 4 percent of the vote going towards the party.

On May 14, 2022, party members elected Colin Krieger as the new leader of the party. Krieger won the leadership race with 52 per cent of the vote against Tariq Elnaga.

The party was deregistered by Elections Canada on February 28, 2025, after "failing to provide the Registered Party's Annual Financial Transactions Return and auditor's report for 2023."

== Provincial Wexit parties ==
While the Wexit movement organized provincial parties to run candidates, the Maverick Party was not directly affiliated with any of these parties. The two main organizers of the #Wexit movement were Peter Downing and Pat King.

=== Alberta ===
On January 11, 2020, a Wexit rally was held at the Alberta legislature grounds with the goal of collecting the 8,400 signatures required for official party status.

Wexit reserved the name "Wexit Alberta" with Elections Alberta for use by a provincial party. According to its constitution, its plans included abolishing the provincial branch of the Royal Canadian Mounted Police and the reestablishment of the prior Alberta Provincial Police. It planned to adopt a currency to replace the Canadian dollar as well.

On April 27, 2020, Wexit Alberta and the Freedom Conservative Party of Alberta announced plans to merge into a new party called the Wildrose Independence Party of Alberta. Both parties voted to approve the merger on June 29, 2020. In July 2020, Wildrose Independence Party of Alberta (WIPA) was registered with Elections Alberta, giving effect to the merger. In October 2020, the People's Party of Alberta dissolved and its board members committed support WIPA.

=== British Columbia ===
In November 2019, members of a Wexit group held a rally in Prince George. Wexit BC became a registered party with Elections BC on December 27, 2019.

Officially, the party ran two candidates in the 2020 British Columbia general election. At the time the election was called, Lee Smith was the party's leader but he resigned shortly after. After final nominations closed, the party announced that it was retracting its endorsements of both of its candidates. As this occurred after the close of nominations, both candidates still appeared on the ballot identified as Wexit BC candidates.

The party was deregistered on July 4, 2022 after failing to file an annual financial report.

Election	Candidates	Votes	% of votes	% where running	Seats	Position	Government
2020	2 / 87	673	0.04	2.55	0 / 87	10th	Extra-parliamentary

=== Saskatchewan ===
The day after the 2019 federal election, Scott Moe, Premier of Saskatchewan, proposed a "New Deal" with the federal government. He called for an end to the federal carbon tax, renegotiation of the equalization formula, and action on oil-pipeline projects. In the weeks after the election, Wexit volunteers began collecting signatures to form a new party. They called on Moe to hold a referendum on separation, saying that if he did not agree they would form a party to do so.

On March 10, 2020, Wexit Saskatchewan became registered as a provincial party with Elections Saskatchewan. Its first interim leader was Jake Wall. Once registered, Wexit Saskatchewan proposed a referendum on independence in its platform.

On June 3, 2020, the party's executive board voted to change the party's name to Buffalo Party of Saskatchewan. That decision ratified by a membership vote. In July 2020, the party changed its name, and named Wade Sira as its new interim leader.

In the 2020 Saskatchewan general election, the Buffalo Party ran in 17 of the 61 ridings and captured 2.56 per cent of the vote.

== Party leaders ==
Leadership elections	Name	Term start	Term end	Riding while leader	Notes
None	Peter Downing	January 10, 2020	June 23, 2020	None	First leader
Interim	Jay Hill	June 23, 2020	May 14, 2022	None	Interim leader
May 14, 2022	Colin Krieger	May 14, 2022	February 28, 2025	None	

== Policies ==
No politician has ever endorsed Western secession while sitting as a Member of Parliament in the House of Commons. Even at the provincial level, it is rare for Western Canadian legislators to openly sympathize with separatism, and no MLA has ever won re-election after doing so. The only Western Canadian candidate to ever win election while openly running for a party with a secessionist platform was Gordon Kesler, who won as a Western Canada Concept MLA in a 1982 by-election; even in that case Kesler downplayed the separatist aspect of his party's platform.

The party is seeking a presence in the House to advance its goals and ensure the frustrations of Western Canadians are heard. Following the election of Erin O'Toole as the new Conservative Party of Canada leader, Jay Hill was critical, saying that Western Canada would be on the "back burner" under O'Toole's leadership. In September 2020, Hill criticized O'Toole for statements that the Conservatives would ensure Canada meets the Paris Agreement climate change targets.

On April 26, 2022, the party released their policy platform. The platform includes repealing Trudeau’s efforts to block Western economic development such as the ‘No More Pipelines bill’ (C-69) and the ‘Tanker Ban’ (C-48), making major revisions to the equalization formula, institute fiscal responsibility, reduce trade barriers within Canada, increase the exploration and mining of minerals, strengthen provincial autonomy, introduce direct democracy, reform firearms legislation, give greater control of immigration to the provinces, and defunding the CBC.

While opposing any form of carbon tax, the Maverick Party took a different approach to dealing with environmental concerns than the Liberals or Conservatives. It did not ignore climate change altogether; instead, the party advocates for energy options such as nuclear, thermal, biomass, LNG (liquified natural gas) and carbon capture projects to reduce greenhouse gas emissions in western Canada.

== Electoral performance ==
Election	Leader	Candidates	Votes	% of votes	% where running	Seats	+/–	Position	Government
2021	Jay D. Hill	29	35,178	0.21	2.30	0 / 338	0	▲8th	Extra-parliamentary

=== By-elections ===
By-election	Date	Candidate	Votes	%	Place
Calgary Heritage	July 24, 2023	Dan Irving	131	0.54%	7/8

== See also ==
- Cascadia (independence movement)
- Reform Party of Canada
- Western alienation
- Western Block Party
- Western Canada Concept
- 2021 Canadian federal election in Alberta
- 2021 Canadian federal election in Saskatchewan
- 2021 Canadian federal election in British Columbia
