= Western Canada Concept =

Defunct Canadian political party

The Western Canada Concept was a Western Canadian federal political party founded in 1981 to promote the separation of the provinces of Manitoba, Saskatchewan, Alberta and British Columbia, and the Yukon and Northwest Territories (which included present-day Nunavut) from Canada in order to create a new nation.

The party argued that Western Canada could not receive fair treatment while the interests of Quebec and Ontario dominated Canadian politics. The party gained popularity in Alberta when western alienation was at its height following the federal Liberal government announcement of the National Energy Program in October 1980.

In 1982, the party merged with the Western Canada Federation, also known as WestFed, a similar regionalist party.

The most prominent leader of the party was Doug Christie, a British Columbia lawyer best known for having represented neo-Nazis James Keegstra, Ernst Zündel and Wolfgang Droege. To distance itself from Christie, the national party expelled him from the leadership in 1981 and denied him a membership in the party's Alberta branch. He later became leader of British Columbia's provincial branch of the party and ran for the party at the national and provincial levels several times. In 2005, he announced the creation of the Western Block Party which would be a western version of the Bloc Québécois.

At the time of his death in 2013, Christie maintained a website with the "Western Canada Concept" name; however, Western Canada Concept was no longer a registered political party.

== Provincial wings ==
=== Alberta ===
The Alberta wing first ran for office in by-elections to the 19th Alberta Legislature. One member of the party, Gordon Kesler, was elected in a 1982 provincial by-election in Olds-Didsbury riding that drew national attention. Kesler became leader of the Alberta WCC with his election to the legislature. The best showing for the party came later in the same year in the 1982 Alberta general election, where they ran almost a full slate of candidates and took 11.8 per cent of the vote. But the party did not elect any MLAs, and Kesler lost his own seat.

In 1984, Kesler was replaced by Jack Ramsay, later a federal Reform Member of Parliament. Some of the more doctrinaire figures in the party opposed Ramsay's leadership, claiming that he was not genuinely committed to western independence. The party ran 20 candidates in the 1986 Alberta general election, but won less than one percent of the popular vote.

In 1987, a group of Alberta members who were dissatisfied with the party's leadership and direction left the party to establish the Western Independence Party.

=== British Columbia ===
In British Columbia, the party continued to exist far longer than in other provinces. It ran candidates from the early 1980s until the mid-2000s, under the leadership of Doug Christie. It never won a seat.

=== Manitoba ===
The Manitoba branch of the party only ran in the 1986 Manitoba general election and some by-elections, never winning a substantial portion of the votes.

=== Saskatchewan ===
The Saskatchewan branch of the party attracted two sitting members of the Legislative Assembly who represented the party for a few months in 1986 before being kicked out of the party.

== See also ==
- List of political parties in Canada
- Secessionist movements of Canada
- Alberta separatism § Wexit
- Maverick Party
