= 2026 Green Party of Canada leadership election =

- November 14, 2026
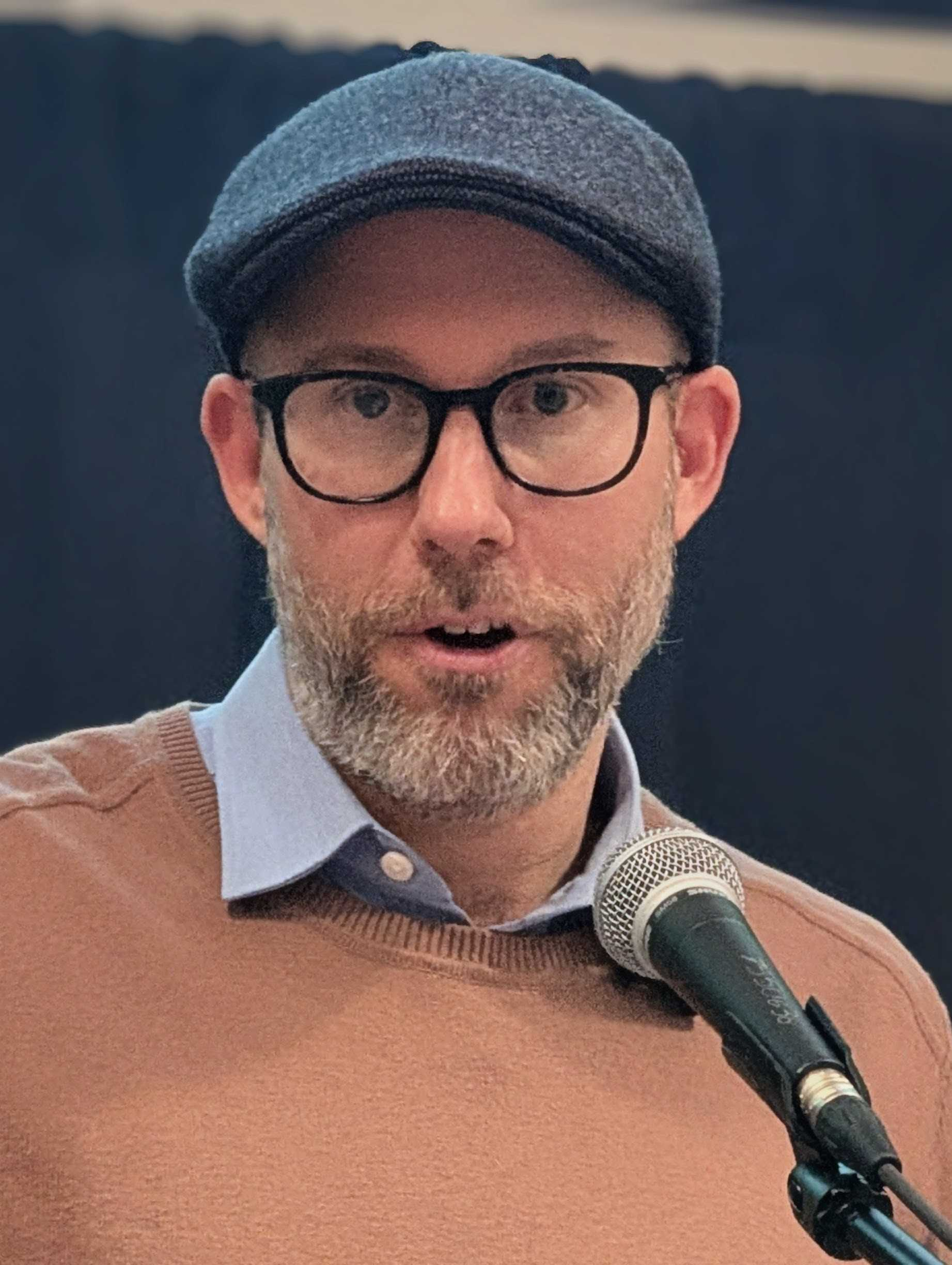

Candidate	Mike Morrice	None of the above
Votes	3,318	117
Percentage	96.6%	3.4%
Leader before election
Elizabeth May
Elected Leader
Mike Morrice

2026 Green Party leadership election
- Date: November 14, 2026
- Resigning leader: Elizabeth May
- Won by: Mike Morrice
- Ballots: 1
- Candidates: 1 (+ none of the above)
- Entrance fee: $15,000

The 2026 Green Party of Canada leadership election was held from November 2 to 13, 2026, to elect a leader or two co-leaders to succeed Elizabeth May, who had announced on August 19, 2025, that she would not lead the party into the next federal election. Former MP Mike Morrice was elected leader with 96.6% of the vote, defeating the "none of the above" option. Morrice was the only candidate on the ballot following the withdrawal of Nira Dookeran, the only other approved candidate. As the party's constitution did not provide for acclamation, a vote was required despite Morrice being the sole remaining candidate.

== Background ==
Elizabeth May was elected as the leader of the Green Party in the 2022 leadership election, while Jonathan Pedneault was ratified as co-leader in the 2025 co-leadership election. May had first been elected party leader in 2006 before returning to the position after her resignation in 2020.

In the 2025 Canadian federal election, the Green Party won only one seat, one less than the previous election, receiving the party's worst popular vote since 2000. Its national vote share was 1.2%, a drop of 1.13 percentage points from 2.33% in 2021. The only seat secured was in the British Columbia riding of Saanich—Gulf Islands, where party leader Elizabeth May was re-elected. Meanwhile, co-leader Jonathan Pedneault failed to win in the riding of Outremont, coming in at fifth place.

After the election results were announced, Green Party co-leader May expressed her gratitude for once again earning the trust and support of voters in her riding, and voiced her hopefulness about the party retaining a seat in the context of a minority government. She acknowledged that although the Green Party's overall national performance was disappointing, with a historically low share of the vote, she remains committed to the importance of environmental and social justice issues and will continue to advocate for them in Parliament. May emphasized that an individual victory is not an endpoint, but part of a broader effort to advance national environmental policy and democratic reform. She also expressed openness to taking on a more active role in Parliament in the future.

Green Party co-leader Pedneault expressed regret that the party had won only one seat and failed to gain broad support from voters. He acknowledged that the Greens had not achieved the breakthrough they had hoped for in this election. Pedneault stated that, as co-leader, he bore political responsibility for the outcome and thus chose to resign from his leadership position. He emphasized that this decision was not driven by personal disappointment, but by a commitment to responsible party leadership.

On August 19, 2025, May announced her intention to resign as party leader before the next federal election. May said that she intended to continue as the MP for Saanich—Gulf Islands and to remain party leader following a required leadership review, stating that she would resign when a new leader or co-leaders were chosen. She also said that she wished to remain leader "at least until 2026".

=== Electoral system ===
In February 2024, party members were to vote on motions which, if passed, would have amended the party's constitution to implement a co-leadership model. However, the proposed constitutional amendment was not voted upon due to disagreement within the party. Before the 2025 federal election, the motion was brought up again and was approved on February 4, 2025, in a landslide. Candidates could either put themselves forward as individuals or as a co-leadership team of two people. Members running on a joint-leadership ticket could not be of the same gender.

== Rules ==
To be eligible, a candidate:

- must complete a leadership contest application;
- must sign up a minimum of 200 members, including 50 members of the Young Greens of Canada;
- must commit to fundraising $15,000;
- must have been a member in good standing for at least three months at the end of the application period, unless their employment prohibited them from membership in a political party;
- must be eligible for election to the House of Commons; have no debt owed to the party;
- have no open litigation against the party;
- must be solvent;
- must not have participated in the writing of the campaign rules;
- must be "confirmed to be proficient in speaking and understanding speech in both official languages, such that they can carry out their duties in both languages", unless an Indigenous applicant;
- must have "not demonstrated a pattern, or committed a single egregious act, within reasonable recency, of evidenced and documented violations of the GPC members’ code of conduct, such as inciting or committing violence, racism or abuse";
- has not engaged in a pattern of public advocacy of "positions contrary to the Global Green Principles".

All party members aged 14 and older were eligible to vote.

== Timeline ==
=== 2025 ===
- April 28 – The 2025 Canadian federal election was held.
- April 30 – Jonathan Pedneault resigned as co-leader.
- August 19 – Elizabeth May announced she would resign prior to the next federal election.
- September 15 – Voting began in a required leadership review. May called on members to support her continued leadership by voting "YES" in the review. A group of members penned a letter calling for a "no" vote to allow for "renewal, growth, and a bold new chapter".
- September 30 – Voting in the leadership review ended.
- October 1 – It was announced that May had received 80.8% support in the leadership review. She vowed to remain party leader until a successor is elected.

=== 2026 ===
- June 11 – The party announced its timeline for the leadership election and the application period opened.
- July 17 – The application period closed.
- August 5 – Nira Dookeran and Mike Morrice were announced as the approved candidates.
- September 8 – Dookeran withdrew her candidacy.
- September 30 — Deadline for approved candidates to sign up at least 200 new members and raise at least $15,000 to get on the final ballot.
- October 14 – Deadline for new members to join and be eligible to vote.
- November 2–13 – Voting by ranked ballot.
- November 14 – Mike Morrice was announced as the winner of the leadership election, receiving 96.6% of the vote. The results were announced at Allsaints (315 Chapel Street), Ottawa.

== Candidates ==
=== Approved ===
Approved candidates were required to sign up at least 200 new members and raise at least $15,000 by September 30 to qualify for the final ballot.

Candidate	Experience	Campaign announced	Campaign details	Ref.
Mike Morrice	MP for Kitchener Centre (2021–2025); Deputy leader of the Green Party (2025–2026)	August 5, 2026	Website	

=== Withdrawn ===
Candidate	Experience	Campaign announced	Campaign withdrawn	Campaign details	Ref.
Nira Dookeran	Federal Green candidate for Ottawa South in 2025, in Carleton in 2021, and in Ottawa—Vanier in the 2017 federal by-election and in 2015; Ontario Green candidate in Ottawa South in 2025 and in 2022; Educator and community activist	August 5, 2026	September 8, 2026	Website	

=== Declined ===
- Paul Manly, MP for Nanaimo—Ladysmith (2019–2021), Nanaimo City Councillor (2022–present)

== Results ==
2026 Green Party of Canada leadership election results
Candidate	Votes	Percentage
Mike Morrice	3,318	96.6%
None of the above	117	3.4%
Total	3,435	100%

== See also ==
- Green Party of Canada leadership elections
