= YGC =

YGC may refer to:

- Yale Glee Club, a collegiate choir in the U.S.
- Young Greens of Canada, a political party youth wing
- Ysbyty Glan Clwyd, a hospital in Wales, UK
- Yeast Extract Glucose Chloramphenicol Agar, a growth medium, used in microbiology
