= Trevor Hancock =

Canadian politician

Leader of The Green Party of Canada
- In office 1983–1984
- Preceded by: Position Established
- Succeeded by: Seymour Trieger

Personal details
- Party: Green Party of Canada
- Education: University of London (MD); University of Toronto (MHSc)
- Occupation: Professor, Doctor, Activist

Trevor Hancock is a family physician. He was the first leader of both the Green Party of Ontario and the Green Party of Canada. Under his leadership, the latter party ran 60 candidates in the 1984 federal election. He is a public health physician, and a retired professor and senior scholar at the School of Public Health and Social Policy at the University of Victoria. He obtained his degree in medicine at the University of London and his degree in health science at the University of Toronto. He also consults with the World Health Organization. Together with Dr. Leonard Duhl, he created the Healthy Cities project that looks at environmental aspects of sustainable urban development as a determinant of health. In 2005, Hancock was also instrumental in initiating BC Healthy Communities – a provincial initiative focused on building capacity for healthy municipal governance.

== Electoral record ==
1984 Canadian federal election
Party	Candidate	Votes	%
New Democratic	Neil Young	14,914	40.6
Progressive Conservative	Jack Jones	12,443	33.9
Liberal	Terry Kelly	8,155	22.2
Green	Trevor Hancock	581	1.6
Libertarian	Dennis Corrigan	353	1.0
Independent	Terrence Kennedy	132	0.4
Independent	John Turmel	112	0.3
Commonwealth of Canada	Ron Thorsen	27	0.1
Turnout		36,177	100.0
Parliament of Canada:

== Select bibliography ==
- Tesh, Sylvia Noble, Carolyn Tuohy, Tom Christoffel, Trevor Hancock, Judy Norsigian, Elena Nightingale, and Leon Robertson. "The meaning of healthy public policy." Health Promotion International 2, no. 3 (1987): 257–262. volume 2, issue 3 (1987). 1987. DOI: 10.1093/heapro/2.3.257.

== See also ==
- Alliance for Healthy Cities
