= Bruce A. Williams =

Media studies professor

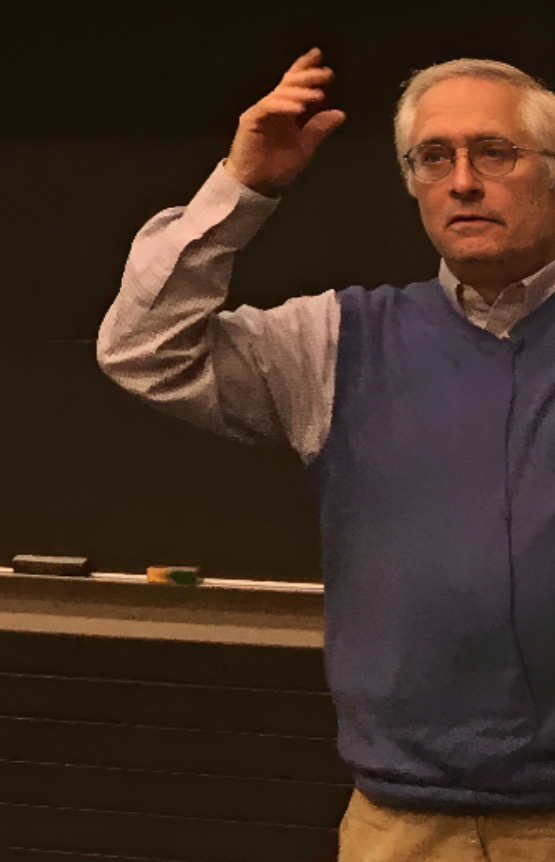
Bruce Williams lecturing at the University of Virginia on November 19, 2016.

Bruce A. Williams (born 1952) is an American political scientist and media studies scholar.

== Biography ==
Williams received a PhD in political science from the University of Minnesota in 1980. He has held faculty positions at the Pennsylvania State University, the University of Kentucky, the University of Michigan, the University of Illinois, and the London School of Economics. Presently, Williams is a professor of media studies at the University of Virginia in Charlottesville, Virginia. He has been a co-editor of the academic journal The Communication Review since 1999.

== Research ==
Professor Williams has published three books and more than forty scholarly journal articles and book chapters. His book Democracy, Dialogue, and Environmental Disputes: The Contested Languages of Social Regulation (with Albert Matheny), published by Yale University Press won the Caldwell Prize as best book for 1996 from the "Science, Technology, and Environmental Politics" section of the American Political Science Association. His textbook The Play of Power: An Introduction to American Politics (with James Eisenstein, Mark Kessler, and Jacqueline Switzer), St. Martin's Press, 1996 was selected by the Women's Caucus of the American Political Science Association in 1997 as the political science text published in the previous three years that best deals with women's issues and diversity.

In addition to several recent articles, in 2010, Professor Williams and coauthor Professor Andrea L. Press published The New Media Environment: What's New, What's Not?

== Selected publications ==
- Williams, Bruce A.; Eisenstein, James; Kessler, Mark; Switzer, Jacqueline Vaughn (1996). The play of power: an introduction to American government. New York: St. Martin's Press. ISBN 9780312142124.
- Williams, Bruce A.; Matheny, Albert R. (1998). Democracy, dialogue, and environmental disputes: the contested languages of social regulation. New Haven London: Yale University Press. ISBN 9780300075540.
- Williams, Bruce A.; Press, Andrea L. (2010). The new media environment: an introduction. Chichester, West Sussex, U.K. Malden, Massachusetts: Wiley-Blackwell. ISBN 9781405127677.
- Williams, Bruce A.; Carpini, Michael X. Delli (2011). After broadcast news: media regimes, democracy, and the new information environment. New York: Cambridge University Press. ISBN 9780521279833.
- Tesh, Sylvia Noble, and Bruce A. Williams. "Identity politics, disinterested politics, and environmental justice." Polity 28.3 (1996): 285–305. DOI: 10.2307/3235374. volume 28, issue 3 (1996). 1996
