= NDIS =

NDIS may refer to:

- National Disability Insurance Scheme, Australian disability support service scheme
- National DNA Index System, an American interstate DNA database
- Network Driver Interface Specification, computer application programming interface for network interface cards
- NDISwrapper, software application
- Nissan Direct Ignition System, found in the Nissan VQ engine

== See also ==
- Ndiss Kaba Badji (born 1983), Senegalese athlete
- NDI (disambiguation) for the singular of NDIs
