= Kelly DeRidder =

Canadian politician

Kelly DeRidder MP

Member of Parliament for Kitchener Centre
- Incumbent
- Assumed office April 28, 2025
- Preceded by: Mike Morrice

Personal details
- Party: Conservative
- Education: Conestoga College

Kelly DeRidder is a Canadian politician, technologist, and educator serving as the member of Parliament (MP) for Kitchener Centre since 2025. She is a member of the Conservative Party of Canada.

== Early life and career ==
DeRidder attended Conestoga College, specializing as a mechanical engineering technologist. Prior to entering politics, DeRidder was a professor at Conestoga College and project manager for Rockwell Automation.

== Political career ==
DeRidder was elected to represent Kitchener Centre in the 2025 Canadian federal election, in what was considered an upset, defeating incumbent Green MP Mike Morrice by a slim margin.

In August 2025, DeRidder served as a panelist at the Civic Clarity Foundation’s panel on youth mental health and the role of good governance. The panel featured legislators from multiple jurisdictions and across party lines, including representatives from Conservative, Liberal, Green, and municipal offices.

== Electoral record ==
2025 Canadian federal election: Kitchener Centre
Party	Candidate	Votes	%	±%	Expenditures
Conservative	Kelly DeRidder	20,234	34.25	+9.41	$81,506.75
Green	Mike Morrice	19,859	33.61	+0.24	$132,472.06
Liberal	Brian Adeba	17,292	29.27	+11.91	$84,032.97
New Democratic	Heather Zaleski	1,157	1.96	–15.54	$0.00
People's	Wasai Rahimi	334	0.57	–6.08	none listed
Animal Protection	Ellen Papenburg	111	0.19	–0.09	$4,107.56
United	Margaretha Dyck	97	0.2	N/A	$474.29
Total valid votes/expense limit		59,084	99.33	+0.53	$131,951.74
Total rejected ballots		399	0.67	–0.47	
Turnout		59,483	69.25	+6.85	
Eligible voters		85,885			
Conservative notional gain from Green		Swing		+4.57	
Source: Elections Canada
