= Sustainable Waterloo Region =

- Type: Not-for-profit
- Location: Waterloo, Ontario, Canada
- Staff: 6
- Volunteers: 40
- Website: http://www.sustainablewaterlooregion.ca

Sustainable Waterloo Region is a non-profit organization headquartered in Waterloo, Ontario, Canada with a mission to foster collaborations that enable local organizations to convert their sustainability interest into action.

== History ==
Sustainable Waterloo Region, formerly Sustainable Waterloo, was founded by Mike Morrice and Chris DePaul in 2008 as part of a business project at Wilfrid Laurier University's School of Business and Economics. Their research focused on the business implications of imminent carbon pricing mechanisms and the viability of establishing a non-profit in the Waterloo Region that would help organizations achieve carbon reductions through collaborations and education.

Inspiration came from the success of Sustainable Silicon Valley and CivicAction (formerly the Toronto City Summit Alliance). In July 2008, Sustainable Waterloo incorporated as a not-for-profit with a "vision for an environmentally and economically resilient community that believes economic growth should not come at the expense of green and sustainable practices".

Sustainable Waterloo Region hosted its first Educational Forum in January 2009 with over 200 people in attendance, confirming community-wide interest in GHG reductions and support of the organization.

Sustainable Waterloo Region received seed funding from various local businesses, academic institutions, government, and education institutions. Sustainable Waterloo's Founding Partners include Wilfrid Laurier University's CMA Centre for Business Sustainability, Virtual Causeway, Manulife Financial, Waterloo North Hydro Inc, the City of Kitchener, and Ernst & Young.

=== Name change ===
In September 2011, Sustainable Waterloo updated its name, brand, and office space. At the start of the annual event season, Sustainable Waterloo launched its new name: Sustainable Waterloo Region. This name was chosen to better reflect the regional element of the organization's mission and the geographical diversity of Regional Carbon Initiative members. To accompany the name change, the organization shed its previous “squiggle” in exchange for a logo that better communicated inclusivity and holistic sustainability.

At the same time, Sustainable Waterloo Region's office moved from its Uptown Waterloo location to the downtown Kitchener Tannery District.

==== New logo ====
With this name change also came an update to the organization's logo. The Sustainable Waterloo Region logo uses the same font as the organization's original logo to demonstrate ties to its roots. The blue and green cyclical arrow represents the organization's holistic view of sustainability, which goes beyond greenhouse gas reductions. The emphasis on “able” reflects optimism for what Waterloo Region can achieve.

== The Regional Carbon Initiative ==
Sustainable Waterloo's initial project is referred to as The Regional Carbon Initiative, which facilitates voluntary carbon emission reduction targets by providing participating organizations with an online tool to measure their carbon emissions, educational forums, and technical workshops, used to learn from their peers about how to reduce emissions. They also aim for as much public recognition as possible for those companies that are successful in reducing emissions. The Regional Carbon Initiative launched on June 16, 2009, with the announcement of its first three Pledging Partners, Veriform Inc., Athena Software, and Enermodal Engineering, who have voluntarily committed to a carbon reduction target under Sustainable Waterloo's framework. Sustainable Waterloo also released the Guide to the Regional Carbon Initiative, which is a document that details the official reduction framework, the reporting procedure, and the GHG accounting methodology that will be used for all Pledging Partners.

== Membership in the Regional Carbon Initiative ==
Interested parties have two membership options for the Regional Carbon Initiative.

A Pledging Partner reports and works towards carbon emission reductions through the use of services provided. Sustainable Waterloo also publicly communicates the Pledging Partner's reduction targets.

An Observing Organization is provided with the same service offerings as a Pledging Partner, and either uses alternative programs to track and report their carbon emissions or works towards participation in the future.

A Sustaining Partner is a Pledging Partner that has generously committed to a higher annual financial investment in Sustainable Waterloo. Their added support strengthens Sustainable Waterloo's capacity to achieve its mission.

=== Current members ===
==== Sustaining partners ====
Organization	Baseline	Target Commitment Level	Type of Reduction Commitment
Virtual Causeway	2009	Bronze	20% absolute reduction of carbon emissions in 10 years

==== Pledging partners ====
Organization	Baseline	Target Commitment Level	Type of Reduction Commitment
Enermodal Engineering	2008	Gold	100% intensity-based reduction of carbon emissions in 10 years
Veriform Inc	2006	Gold	100% absolute reduction of carbon emissions in 10 years
Whiting Design	2009	Gold	100% absolute reduction of carbon emissions in 10 years
XCG Consultants	2008/2009	Gold	100% absolute reduction of carbon emissions in 10 years
Athena Software	2009	Bronze	20% intensity-based reduction of carbon emissions in 10 years
Deloitte	2010	Bronze	20% absolute reduction of carbon emissions in 10 years
Ernst & Young	2009	Bronze	20% absolute reduction of carbon emissions in 10 years
Mennonite Central Committee	2008	Bronze	20% absolute reduction of carbon emissions in 10 years
Pano Cap Canada	2009	Bronze	20% intensity-based reduction of carbon emissions in years

==== Observing organizations ====
Organization
Region of Waterloo *Observing Organization with commitment
Brighton Yards Housing Co-op
Centre for International Governance Innovation
City of Kitchener
City of Waterloo
Cober Evolving Solutions
EarthFX Energy Inc
Eco-Shift Power Corp
Energent
Farm Mutual Reinsurance Plan
Gore Mutual Insurance Company
Grand River Conservation Authority
Grand River Personnel
House of Friendship
Hutton Forest Products
The Kitchener and Waterloo Community Foundation
Mennonite Savings and Credit Union
Miovision Technologies
Northern Digital
Ontario Teachers Insurance Plan
Quarry Integrated Communications
Quiet Nature
Read Jones Christoffersen
Sun Life Financial
The Economical Insurance Group
United Way
Vigor Clean Tech
VIP Energy Services Inc
WalterFedy
Waterloo North Hydro
Waterloo Region Record
Wilfrid Laurier University
