= The Communication Review =

- Discipline: Communication
- Language: English
- Edited by: Andrea L. Press, and Bruce A. Williams

Publication details
- History: 1995–present
- Publisher: Routledge
- Frequency: Quarterly
- Impact factor: 1.8 (2023)

Standard abbreviations
- ISO 4: Commun. Rev.

Indexing
- ISSN: 1547-7487

Links
- Journal homepage

The Communication Review is a peer-reviewed academic journal covering a great variety of aspects of media studies published by England-based publisher Routledge. Since 1999, the editors-in-chief have been Andrea L. Press (University of Virginia) and Bruce A. Williams (University of Virginia). The journal was established in 1995 with Robert Horwitz as founding editor.

The journal bridges the fields of communications and media studies, including historical and feminist scholarship.

== Abstracting and indexing ==
The journal is indexed and abstracted in the following bibliographic databases:

- EBSCO databases
- Emerging Sources Citation Index
- MLA - Modern Language Association Database
- Scopus

According to the Journal Citation Reports, the journal has a 2023 impact factor of 1.8. According to Scopus, the journal has a CiteScore of 3.4, ranking 119 out of 511 in the category "Communication".
