= Enermodal Engineering =

- founded: 1980
- offices: Kitchener, Calgary, Edmonton, Winnipeg, and Toronto
- president (Canada): Stephen Carpenter
- services: sustainable buildings and communities, building design and commissioning, greening existing buildings, building research and technology transfer, window design and rating
- www.enermodal.com

Enermodal Engineering was an engineering consulting firm that specialized in the creation of green buildings and communities. It provided LEED services for large-scale green buildings in Canada. Enermodal Engineering designed several conservative building projects in Canada and the USA. In 2010, the company was acquired by MMM, which subsequently was acquired by WSP (2016).

== History ==
Enermodal Engineering was founded in 1980. Initially, the firm was focused on developing software for the assessment of renewable energy systems and building energy usage being able to analyze the performance of windows from an energy standpoint. Such software eventually became the tool to rate windows to NFRC and CSA window standards.

In 1991, the firm designed and managed the construction of the Waterloo Green Home which lead to an awarded entry in the Canadian federal government Advanced Houses competition. The house was the subject of a book, Green Home, by Wayne Grady.

Enermodal designed and occupied the first green office building in Canada in 1996: "Green on the Grand" in Kitchener, Ontario was a notable design submitted under the Canadian government's C2000 program that promoted green office buildings. With an annual energy use of just over 100 kWh/m^{2}, Green on the Grand is noted still as an efficient building in Canada. Another Enermodal building is the University of Ottawa Biology Building, which achieved 70% energy savings, acquiring a number of awards because of it.

The firm began designing and certifying buildings to the LEED Green Building Rating System in 2004 (Leadership in Energy and Environmental Design). The firm successfully certified the first building (Stratus Winery) under the Canadian version of LEED. To deal with growing demand for their services, Enermodal opened offices in Calgary (2006), Toronto (2008), Edmonton (2009), and Winnipeg (2010).

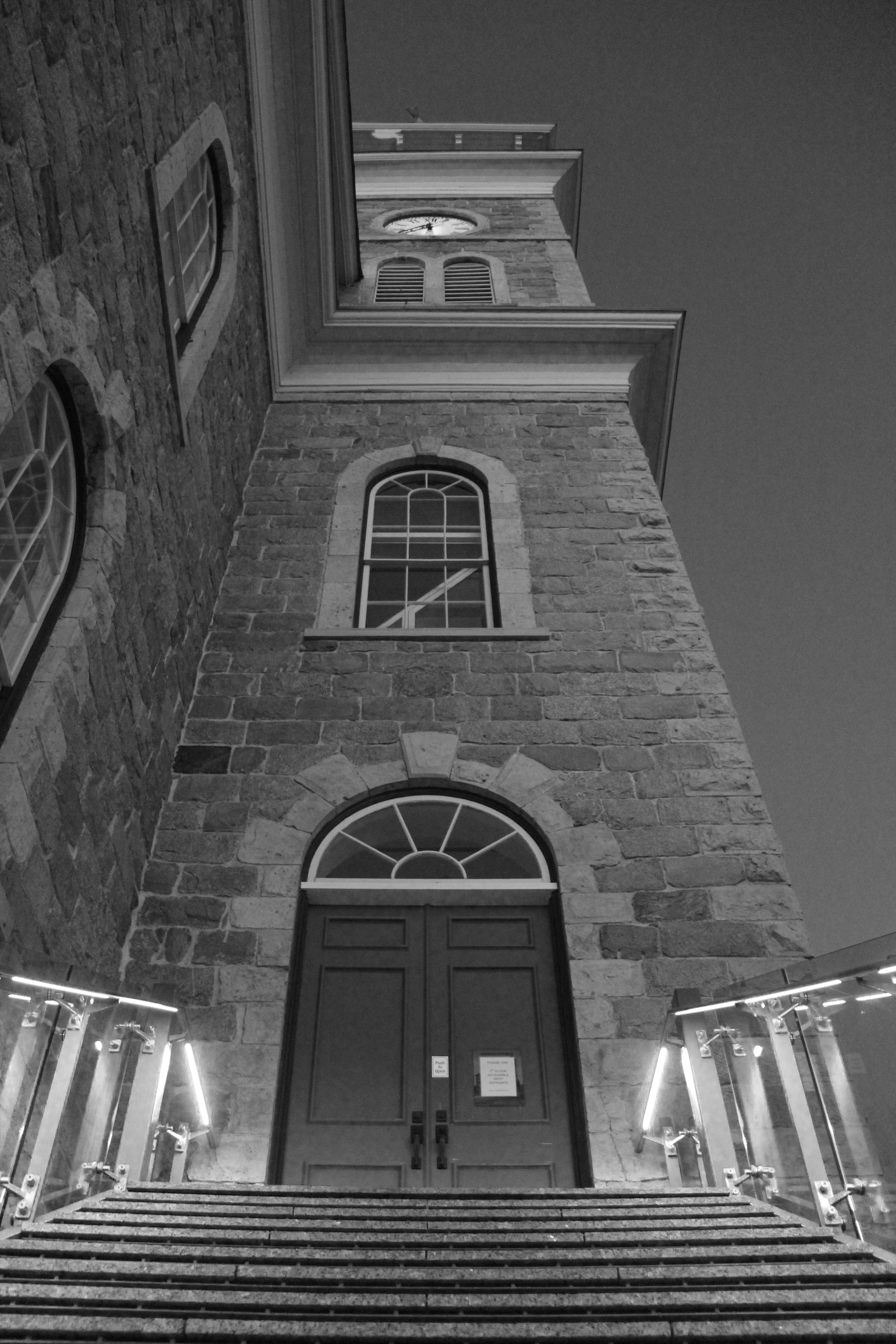
Cambridge City Hall; Cambridge, Ontario

Enermodal won the International Building Performance Simulation Association's "Outstanding Practise Award" in 2007 and the SAB Magazine Sustainable Architecture & Building Award, for the Toronto Region Conservation Authority Restoration Services Centre, in 2008.

In 2009, Enermodal designed and built its own headquarters, A Grander View, which uses 70 kWh/m^{2} - making it Canada's most energy-efficient office building. This building achieved three LEED Platinum certifications and became Canada's most energy-efficient office.

In November 2010, the company was purchased by and became a division of the MMM group (Marshall Macklin Monaghan).

Enermodal had a professional staff of over 100 at its five offices, making it one of North America's largest consulting firms focusing exclusively on the design of sustainable buildings.

Enermodal Engineering was Canada's largest consulting firm exclusively dedicated to green buildings and communities. With a staff of experts in the area of green and energy efficient buildings and specialists that were based in Kitchener, Calgary, Edmonton, Winnipeg, and Toronto, Enermodal is working on sustainability projects worth over $5 billion. For 30 years, Enermodal has marketed green building technologies including rainwater cisterns, onsite biofiltration, radiant cooling, building renewable energy systems, and variable refrigerant flow systems.

Up to 2010, when it was purchased by MMM, Enermodal was the foremost LEED consulting firm, delivering the LEED 2009 Rating System. Employees served as LEED Faculty members, and President Stephen Carpenter was at the time appointed chair of the Technical Advisory Committee at the CaGBC. Enermodal had been involved with 250 LEED projects across North America, and was in 2010 responsible for 45% of all LEED Canada certified buildings.

Enermodal provided LEED services for larger-scale green buildings in Canada, including the Toronto Region Conservation Authority's Restoration Services Centre (first Platinum certification in Ontario), Fifth Town Cheese (first Platinum industrial certification), Currie Barracks (first Canadian Stage 2 LEED-ND certification), and the RBC Centre (at the time, largest LEED project in Canada).

Enermodal's main areas of expertise were

- sustainable design (particularly Leadership in Energy and Environmental Design certification)
- "green" mechanical/electrical design and commissioning
- research into the performance of environmentally appropriate technologies
- building inspection and energy audits
- energy performance rating windows, doors, and walls.

The company had a green incentive program which helped employees reduce their environmental footprint. The company sponsored incentives include free bus passes, rain barrels, low-flow shower heads, and financial support for the purchase of hybrid cars.

=== Acquisition ===
Enermodal Engineering was purchased by MMM Engineers in 2010. MMM was subsequently purchased by WSP in 2016.

== Selected projects ==
Enermodal had over 70 LEED certified buildings and - at the time of their purchase - were working on over 190 other buildings aiming for certification. Some of the major green projects include

- the redevelopment of Regent Park (700 residential units and commercial space), Toronto
- the 50-storey Bay Adelaide Centre, Toronto
- the 500,000 sq ft (46,000 m^{2}) Corus Entertainment Head Office, Toronto
- the 1,400,000 sq ft (130,000 m^{2}) Maple Leaf Towers Condominium, Toronto
- Old Faithful National Park Visitors Education Centre, Wyoming
- the University of Calgary Veterinary School
- Upper River Valley Hospital, New Brunswick
