= Mike Morrice =

Canadian politician

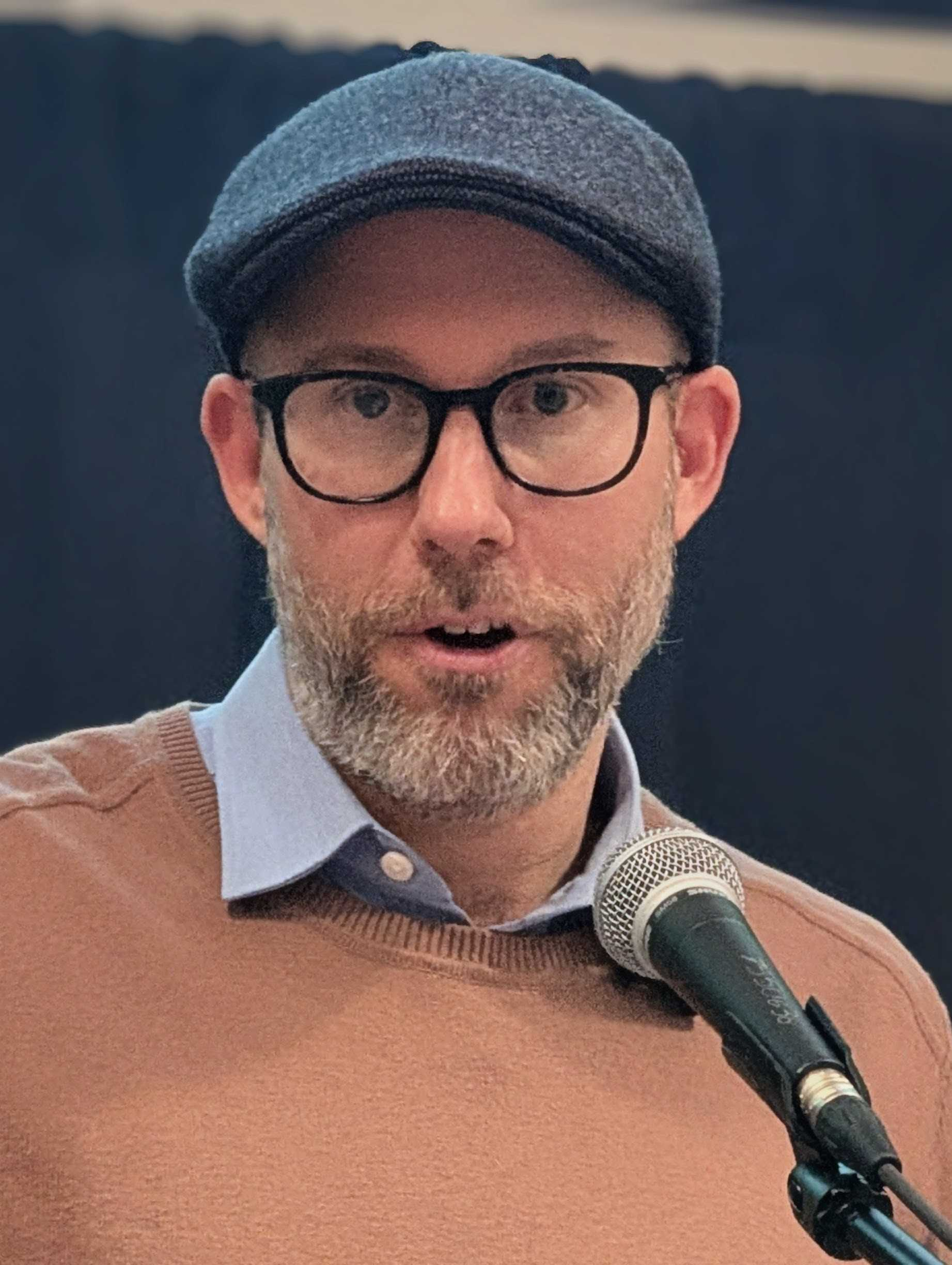
- Morrice in 2025

Leader of the Green Party
- Incumbent
- Assumed office November 14, 2026
- Deputy: Angela Davidson
- Preceded by: Elizabeth May

Deputy Leader of the Green Party
- In office November 28, 2025 – August 5, 2026 Serving with Angela Davidson
- Leader: Elizabeth May
- Preceded by: Jonathan Pedneault (2024)
- Succeeded by: Angela Davidson

Member of Parliament for Kitchener Centre
- In office September 20, 2021 – March 23, 2025
- Preceded by: Raj Saini
- Succeeded by: Kelly DeRidder

Personal details
- Born: Michael Morrice; July 22, 1984 (age 42)
- Party: Green
- Education: Wilfrid Laurier University
- Occupation: Social entrepreneur

Michael Morrice (born July 22, 1984) is a Canadian politician who has been leader of the Green Party of Canada since November 14, 2026. He served as the member of Parliament (MP) for Kitchener Centre from 2021 to 2025. Morrice was first elected to the House of Commons in the 2021 federal election, becoming the party's first MP elected in Ontario and the second elected outside of British Columbia. He was elected leader at the 2026 Green Party of Canada leadership election.

Before entering federal politics, Morrice worked as a social entrepreneur, founding the environmental non-profit Sustainable Waterloo Region and co-founding Green Economy Canada, organizations that work to reduce greenhouse gas emissions and support low-carbon economic development.

== Early life and education ==
Morrice grew up on Montreal's West Island until 1997 when his family relocated to Newmarket, Ontario. In 2003, he enrolled at Wilfrid Laurier University where he received a dual degree in business and computer electronics. While still a student, Morrice became involved in campus research on climate policy and carbon pricing.

Together with fellow student Chris DePaul, Morrice developed the idea for a regional non-profit that would help local organizations measure and reduce their emissions through collaborative targets. In 2008, that project became Sustainable Waterloo Region, a non-profit social enterprise that works with businesses, public institutions and community partners on greenhouse gas reduction plans. In 2013, he co-founded Green Economy Canada, a national organization that supports a network of “Green Economy Hubs” across the country, helping businesses track and cut their emissions. Morrice served as its founding executive director and received recognition including EY’s Ontario Social Entrepreneur of the Year award in 2018 for his work advancing corporate sustainability.

In 2021, Wilfrid Laurier University appointed Morrice as its first Social Entrepreneur in Residence, a part-time role focused on mentoring students and supporting social innovation at the university.

== Political career ==
=== 2019 federal election ===
Morrice was selected as the Green Party's candidate in the 2019 federal election for Kitchener Centre. Morrice lost to incumbent Liberal MP Raj Saini, but increased the Green Party's vote share from 3% to 26%. Morrice later revealed that he was diagnosed with cancer during his 2019 campaign.

=== 2021 federal election ===
In 2021, while still serving in his role at Laurier, Morrice again sought the Green nomination in Kitchener Centre and was confirmed as the party’s candidate. During the campaign, Saini ended his re-election bid after a former staffer made allegations of misconduct against him; a subsequent investigation by The Record found the allegations were based on anonymous claims and that no evidence was ever provided to support them. Because the withdrawal came after Elections Canada's deadline, Saini's name remained on the ballot. Several local Liberal figures subsequently endorsed Morrice's candidacy. On election night, Morrice was elected MP with roughly one-third of the vote, flipping the riding from Liberal to Green. His victory made him the first Green MP ever elected in Ontario and, at the time, one of only two federal Green MPs, alongside former (and future) leader Elizabeth May in Saanich—Gulf Islands.

=== Parliamentary career ===
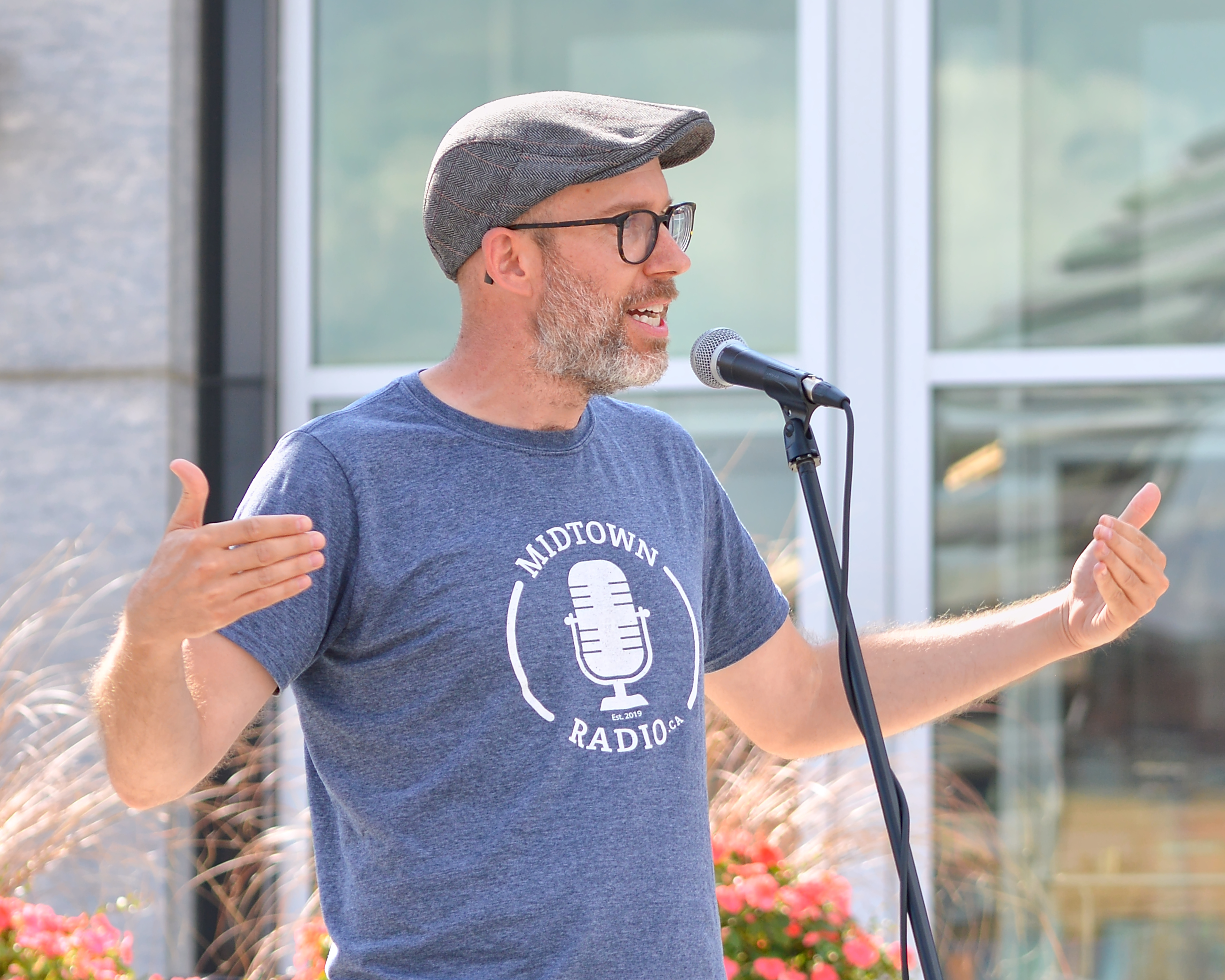
Morrice at the Waterloo Region Rally for Proportional Representation, 2025

As an opposition MP in a minority Parliament, Morrice did not hold formal committee chairships or critic roles, but he was active on a number of files. Morrice became a parliamentary advocate for the Canada Disability Benefit (CDB), and in early 2022, he sponsored a national petition calling on the government to fast-track the benefit so that working-age people with disabilities would receive benefits, a petition that gathered more than 17,000 signatures. He later proposed multiple amendments to Bill C-22, the Canada Disability Benefit Act, including provisions on indexation to inflation and simplified applications.

Morrice pushed for a more stringent federal definition of “affordable housing” tied to incomes rather than market rents, and in 2024 introduced a motion calling on the federal government to revise its criteria for housing funds. Morrice was also a prominent advocate of electoral reform. In 2023, he helped build support in Parliament for a motion calling for a citizens’ assembly on electoral reform, working with civil society organizations and MPs from other parties.

==== 2025 federal election ====
In the 2025 federal election, Morrice, who was one of two Green Party MPs in the House of Commons of Canada, was narrowly ousted from the Kitchener Centre, Ontario riding after losing to Conservative challenger Kelly DeRidder. Following the result, Morrice told media that he intended to take time to reflect on his next steps but remained committed to political issues.

=== Post-parliamentary career ===
On November 28, 2025, the Green Party of Canada announced that Morrice had been appointed deputy leader. In the announcement, party officials cited his record as a community organizer, his environmental background, and his experience as an MP as reasons for the appointment. Reports on the appointment noted that Morrice would also serve as the party’s candidate in Kitchener Centre in the next federal election.

== Leader of the Green Party (2026–present) ==
=== 2026 leadership campaign ===
Following the 2025 election and May's announcement that she would step down as Green leader before the next federal election, commentators discussed Morrice as a potential successor.

On August 5, 2026, Morrice announced his campaign for the Green Party leadership. He stepped down as deputy leader prior to his campaign launch.

On September 8, the sole other candidate in the race, Nira Dookeran, withdrew her candidacy, with Morrice being the only remaining candidate. He was elected on November 14, 2026 with 96.6% over None of the Above.

== Electoral record ==
2026 Green Party of Canada leadership election results
Candidate	Votes	Percentage
Mike Morrice	3,318	96.6%
None of the above	117	3.4%
Total	3,435	100%

2025 Canadian federal election: Kitchener Centre
Party	Candidate	Votes	%	±%	Expenditures
Conservative	Kelly DeRidder	20,234	34.25	+9.41	$81,506.75
Green	Mike Morrice	19,859	33.61	+0.24	$132,472.06
Liberal	Brian Adeba	17,292	29.27	+11.91	$84,032.97
New Democratic	Heather Zaleski	1,157	1.96	–15.54	$0.00
People's	Wasai Rahimi	334	0.57	–6.08	none listed
Animal Protection	Ellen Papenburg	111	0.19	–0.09	$4,107.56
United	Margaretha Dyck	97	0.2	N/A	$474.29
Total valid votes/expense limit		59,084	99.33	+0.53	$131,951.74
Total rejected ballots		399	0.67	–0.47	
Turnout		59,483	69.25	+6.85	
Eligible voters		85,885			
Conservative notional gain from Green		Swing		+4.57	
Source: Elections Canada

2021 Canadian federal election: Kitchener Centre
Party	Candidate	Votes	%	±%	Expenditures
Green	Mike Morrice	17,872	34.9	+8.9	$110,414.01
Conservative	Mary Henein Thorn	12,537	24.5	+0.5	$71,022.32
New Democratic	Beisan Zubi	8,938	17.5	+6.2	$43,723.62
Liberal	Raj Saini (Note: Saini withdrew his candidacy, but after closure of nominations, so remained listed as the Liberal candidate on the ballot.)	8,297	16.2	-20.5	$70,160.14
People's	Diane Boskovic	3,381	6.6	+4.7	$2,346.29
Animal Protection	Ellen Papenburg	154	0.3	+0	$8,074.38
Total valid votes/expense limit		51,179	98.81	-0.36	$112,017.63
Total rejected ballots		525	1.02	+0.19	
Turnout		51,275	62.41	–	
Eligible voters		82,159	–	–	
Green gain from Liberal		Swing		+9.28	
Source: Elections Canada

2019 Canadian federal election: Kitchener Centre
Party	Candidate	Votes	%	±%	Expenditures
Liberal	Raj Saini	20,316	36.69	-12.09	$71,251.01
Green	Mike Morrice	14,394	25.99	+22.94	$72,289.70
Conservative	Stephen Woodworth	13,191	23.82	-6.54	$86,969.26
New Democratic	Andrew Moraga	6,238	11.27	-5.34	$15,354.69
People's	Patrick Bernier	1,033	1.87	–	none listed
Animal Protection	Ellen Papenburg	202	0.36	–	none listed
Total valid votes/expense limit		55,374	99.17	-0.28	
Total rejected ballots		465	0.83	+0.28	
Turnout		55,839	66.57	-0.93	
Eligible voters		83,884	–	–	
Liberal hold		Swing		-17.52	
Source: Elections Canada
