= NDI =

NDI may refer to:

== Organisations ==
- National Dance Institute, a not for profit organization
- National Democratic Institute for International Affairs
- Northern Digital Incorporated, a provider of 3D tracking systems
- National Datacast Incorporated, the PBS datacasting subsidiary

== Science and technology ==
- Nephrogenic diabetes insipidus, a form of diabetes insipidus due primarily to pathology of the kidney
- Network Device Interface, an IP Video and Audio Protocol developed by NewTek
- Naphthalene diimides, dyes used in chemistry; See Naphthalene tetracarboxylic dianhydride
- New Dietary Ingredient, defined by the Dietary Supplement Health and Education Act of 1994 to be a dietary ingredient not marketed in the United States before October 15, 1994

== Other uses ==
- Non-Destructive Inspection, in nondestructive testing
- Non-developmental item, in the Federal Acquisition Regulation
- Net disposable income
