= Sylvia Noble Tesh =

American academic (born 1937)

Sylvia Noble Tesh, born 1937, is an American academic, professor at Yale and the University of Michigan for over two decades, and currently a professor at the University of Arizona. She earned her Ph.D. at the University of Hawaiʻi in political science. She also served as a Fulbright professor at the Universidade Federal da Bahia, in Salvador, Brazil, in 1999. She is best known for her well-cited book Hidden Arguments: Political Ideology and Disease Prevention Policy. Her most recent book, Uncertain Hazards Environmental Activists and Scientific Proof, was published in 2000 by Cornell University Press.

== Selected bibliography ==
- Tesh, Sylvia Noble. “Environment, Science, and Culture.” In Environmental Crisis or Crisis of Epistemology?: Working for Sustainable Knowledge and Environmental Justice. New York: Morgan James Pub., 2011.
- Tesh, Sylvia Noble. “Reducing Deforestation in the Brazilian Amazon: Paradoxes of Environmentalism.” Jean Monnet Working Paper 09/10 (2010). http://jeanmonnetprogram.org/wp-content/uploads/2014/12/100901.pdf.
- Tesh, Sylvia Noble, and Eduardo Paes-Machado. “Sewers, Garbage, and Environmentalism in Brazil.” The Journal of Environment & Development 13, number 1 (March 2004): pages 42–72. https://doi.org/10.1177/1070496503260971.
- Tesh, Sylvia Noble. “The Internet and the Grass Roots.” Organization & Environment 15, number 3 (September 2002): pages 336–39. https://doi.org/10.1177/1086026602153012.
- Tesh, Sylvia Noble. Uncertain Hazards: Environmental Activists and Scientific Proof. Ithaca, New York: Cornell University Press, 2000. https://doi.org/10.7591/9781501717581
- Tesh, Sylvia Noble. “Citizen Experts in Environmental Risk.” Policy Sciences, 1999, page 20. https://doi.org/10.1023/A:1004398228075.
- Tesh, Sylvia Noble, and Bruce A. Williams. “Identity Politics, Disinterested Politics, and Environmental Justice.” Polity 28, number 3 (March 1996): pages 285–305. https://doi.org/10.2307/3235374.
- Tesh, Sylvia Noble. “Miasma and ‘Social Factors’ in Disease Causality: Lessons from the Nineteenth Century.” Journal of Health Politics, Policy and Law 20, number 4 (1995): pages 1001–24. https://doi.org/10.1215/03616878-20-4-1001.
- Tesh, Sylvia Noble, and Bruce A. Williams. “Science, Identity Politics, and Environmental Racism.” In American Political Science Association Meeting. New York, 1994.
- Tesh, Sylvia Noble. “Causal Debates in Environmentalism.” Journal of Public Health Policy 15, number 3 (1994): page 298. https://doi.org/10.2307/3342907.
- Tesh, Sylvia Noble. “New Social Movements and New Ideas.” In Annual Meeting of the American Political Science Association. Washington, DC, 1993.
- Tesh, Sylvia Noble. “Environmentalism, Pre-Environmentalism, and Public Policy.” Policy Sciences 26, number 1 (February 1993): 1–20. https://doi.org/10.1007/BF01006494.
- Tesh, Sylvia Noble. Hidden Arguments: Political Ideology and Disease Prevention Policy. New Brunswick, New Jersey, United States: Rutgers University Press, 1988.
- Tesh, Sylvia Noble, Carolyn Tuohy, Tom Christoffel, Trevor Hancock, Judy Norsigian, Elena Nightingale, and Leon Robertson. "The meaning of healthy public policy." Health Promotion International 2, number 3 (1987): pages 257-262. volume 2, issue 3 (1987). 1987. https://doi.org/10.1093/heapro/2.3.257
- Tesh, Sylvia Noble. “Health Education in Cuba: A Preface.” International Journal of Health Services 16, number 1 (January 1986): pages 87–104. https://doi.org/10.2190/HAA9-DU1Q-0QJR-4JE9.
- Tesh, Sylvia Noble. “The Politics of Stress: The Case of Air Traffic Control.” International Journal of Health Services 14, no. 4 (October 1984): pages 569–87. https://doi.org/10.2190/JH2E-F62P-WMX8-7NQF.
- Tesh, Sylvia Noble. “In Support of ‘Single-Issue’ Politics.” Political Science Quarterly 99, number 1 (1984): page 27. https://doi.org/10.2307/2150257.
- Tesh, Sylvia Noble. “Political Ideology and Public Health in the Nineteenth Century.” International Journal of Health Services 12, number 2 (April 1982): pages 321–42. https://doi.org/10.2190/4REP-0NGX-H2LA-E0AF.
- Tesh, Sylvia Noble. “Disease Causality and Politics.” Journal of Health Politics, Policy and Law 6, number 3 (Fall 1981): pages 369–90. https://doi.org/10.1215/03616878-6-3-369.
- Tesh, Sylvia Noble. “The Politics of Public Health Ideology and Disease Causality.” University of Hawaiʻi, 1980. https://scholarspace.manoa.hawaii.edu/bitstream/10125/10098/uhm_phd_8111346_r.pdf.
- Tesh, Sylvia Noble. “TV Ads & Nutrition.” The Honolulu Advertiser. July 12, 1978.
- Tesh, Sylvia Noble. “Decentralize Democracy.” The Honolulu Advertiser. April 14, 1977.
- Tesh, Sylvia Noble. “Campaign Funding.” The Honolulu Advertiser. October 2, 1973.
