= Joan Russow =

Canadian peace activist

Leader of the Green Party of Canada
- In office April 3, 1997 – 2001
- Preceded by: Harry Garfinkle (interim)
- Succeeded by: Chris Bradshaw (interim)

Personal details
- Born: Joan Elizabeth Russow; November 1, 1938 Ottawa, Ontario, Canada
- Died: July 30, 2026 (aged 87)
- Party: New Democratic (2003—2026)
- Other political affiliations: Green (1993–2001)
- Occupation: Peace activist and politician

Joan Elizabeth Russow (November 1, 1938 – July 30, 2026) was a Canadian peace activist and former national leader of the Green Party of Canada from 1997 to 2001. She was also a co-founder of the Ecological Rights Association and the Global Compliance Research Project.

== Early career ==
Russow received her BA in art history and a master's degree in education from the University of British Columbia. She received her Ph.D. from the University of Victoria in interdisciplinary studies.

Russow first gained attention in the "Lord's Prayer Case", which resulted in the banning of school prayer in public schools in British Columbia in 1989.

In collaboration with professors in the law faculty of the University of Toronto, Russow was the litigant in a Charter challenge of the first-past-the-post electoral system in Canada.

== The Green Party and politics ==
Russow joined the Green Party in 1993 and became leader in 1997. She ran for a seat in the House of Commons of Canada in three federal elections: in Victoria in 1997 and 2000, and in Okanagan—Coquihalla in a by-election in September 2000. She lost all three elections.

Russow was the partner of David Scott White, the former chair of the Green Party of British Columbia, until his death in 2006. White was the manager of Russow's election campaign as leader of the federal Green Party.

Under Russow's leadership the party developed policies promoting social justice, human rights, and peace, as well as the more traditional concerns with the environment.

In the 2001 Quebec City protest against the Free Trade Area of the Americas, Russow was detained for taking a photograph of the jail that was being emptied to incarcerate the FTAA protesters. Russow promoted the Green Party as a leader in the anti-globalization movement, in particular the anti-corporatist and pro-peace movement.

Russow and White left the Green Party in 2001, partly due to the German Green Party's support of the NATO attack on Serbia. Russow and White both joined the NDP in 2003. White continued his work as an activist until his death in 2006, including researching and writing against Canada's military role in Afghanistan.

In 2005, Russow criticized the Green Party under Jim Harris for moving away from some of its original left-wing principles.

== Legal activism ==
Russow was a co-founder of the Ecological Rights Association and the Global Compliance Research Project. In September 2007, she collaborated on a declaration related to climate change. This declaration called upon the Intergovernmental Panel on Climate Change to calculate the contribution of militarism to greenhouse gas emissions.

In March 2008, at the annual meeting of the United Nations Commission on the Status of Women, she collaborated on a paper related to the delegitimization of war; this paper was officially sanctioned for distribution to state delegations at the UN.

On August 4, 2008, in Victoria she presented a representative of Stephen Harper with a paper entitled 95 Articles of Condemnation of the Harper Government.

== International and domestic peace activism ==
Russow developed a "Common Security Index" which was submitted to the Senate Committee on the Anti-Terrorism Act on October 17, 2005. To further common security, the member states of the United Nations have made commitments to work toward the following goals:

- to enable socially equitable and environmentally sound employment, and ensure the right to development and social justice;
- to promote and fully guarantee respect for human rights including labour rights, civil and political rights, social and cultural rights: the right to food, the right to housing, the right to safe drinking water and sewage, the right to education and right to a universally accessible not-for-profit health care system;
- to ensure the preservation and protection of the environment, the respect for the inherent worth of nature beyond human purpose, the reduction of the ecological footprint and to move away from the current model of unsustainable and overconsumptive development;
- to achieve a state of peace and disarmament through reallocation of military expenses; and
- to create a global structure that respects the rule of law and the International Court of Justice.

Russow also spoke out about what she regarded as increased militarism in Canada, focusing on the increased military budget; Canada's military involvement in Afghanistan; military exercises involving U.S. nuclear-powered vessels and nuclear-arms-capable vessels and aircraft using live ammunition; military recruitment advertising; the mining and production of uranium, including its contribution to U.S. and NATO weapons systems; and military flights and participation in community events and parades.

In March 2007, Russow lobbied state delegations in the UN General Assembly to invoke Article 22 of the Charter of the United Nations to set up an international tribunal to try the Bush administration. On March 8, 2007, the petition, in the six official languages, was submitted to the office of the President of the UN General Assembly.

In 2008, Russow was involved in a film project related to co-operatives titled Counterpoint to Corporatism.

For the 2009 Conference on Climate Change in Copenhagen, she submitted a document co-written with Rickard Levicki of England to the state negotiators.

== Sources ==
- "The Globe and Mail Election 2000 Series" Retrieved 11 January 2007.
- "PEJ Obituary David Scott White" Retrieved 11 January 2007.
- "The Province Obituary David Scott White" Retrieved 11 January 2007.
- The University of British Columbia Alumni Directory 1992. Vancouver, B.C. page 558.
- "Lord's Prayer Case".
- Proceedings of the Special Senate Committee on the Anti-terrorism Act.
- Proposed Canadian No-fly list.
- The Bush Regime must be judged by an International Tribunal.
- Co-operatve film project
