= Northern Carleton Hospital =

Hospital in Bath, New Brunswick, Canada

- Location in New Brunswick

Geography
- Location: 82 Hospital St, Bath NB, Atlantic Canada, New Brunswick, Canada
- Coordinates: 46.5091°N 67.5843°W

Organization
- Type: Acute care

Services
- Beds: 23

History
- Founded: ?
- Closed: 2007

Links
- Lists: Hospitals in Canada

The Northern Carleton Memorial Hospital was an acute care hospital located in Bath, New Brunswick, Canada.

It closed in the fall of 2007 as part of a consolidation of health care services in Carleton County and adjacent areas, that saw the opening of a new regional hospital, the Upper River Valley Hospital.
