= Seymour Trieger =

Canadian politician

Leader of the Green Party of Canada
- In office 1984–1988
- Preceded by: Trevor Hancock
- Succeeded by: Kathryn Cholette

Personal details
- Born: November 12, 1924; Newark, New Jersey, United States
- Died: December 10, 2012 (aged 88); Eugene, Oregon, United States

Seymour Trieger (12 November 1924 – 10 December 2012) was the second leader of the Green Party of Canada from 1984 to 1988. Trieger first ran in Nanaimo—Cowichan.

He died aged 88 in Eugene, Oregon.

== Electoral record ==
1988 Canadian federal election: Nanaimo—Cowichan
| Party | Candidate | Votes | % |
|---|---|---|---|
| New Democratic | David Stupich | 27,177 | 49.12 |
| Progressive Conservative | Ted Schellenberg | 18,984 | 34.31 |
| Liberal | Denis St. Denis | 5,210 | 9.42 |
| Reform | George Richard Wrean | 3,314 | 5.99 |
| Green | Seymour Trieger | 484 | 0.87 |
| Communist | Deborah MacDonald | 164 | 0.30 |
| Total valid votes | | 55,333 | 100.0 |
