= Andrea L. Press =

American sociologist and media scholar

Andrea Lee Press is an American sociologist and media studies scholar. She is the William R. Kenan Jr. Professor of Media Studies and Sociology, and Chair of the Media Studies Department, at the University of Virginia.

== Biography ==
Press received a PhD in sociology from the University of California, Berkeley in 1987. She has held faculty positions at the University of California, Davis, the University of Michigan, the University of Illinois at Urbana-Champaign, Hebrew University and the London School of Economics in a variety of departments such as communications, sociology, writing studies, social psychology, and women's studies. Presently, she is the William R. Kenan Jr. Professor of Media Studies and Sociology and Chair of the Media Studies Department at the University of Virginia in Charlottesville, Virginia. She has been a co-editor of the academic journal for International Gender Research, the Yale Center for Comparative Research, the Center for Advanced Study of the University of Illinois, the Stanhope Center for Communications Policy Research, the Tavistock Clinic in London, and the Virginia Foundation for the Humanities. She is the recipient of grants from the National Science Foundation, the National Institute of Mental Health, and the Soroptimist International Foundation. Press is the recipient of the Arnold O. Beckman Award for the best research proposal submitted at the University of Illinois. Her book Women Watching Television was nominated for the Jessie Bernard Award by the American Sociological Association, an award given in recognition of scholarly work that has enlarged the horizons of sociology to encompass fully the role of women in society. In 2019, Press was elected incoming vice-chair of the Feminist Scholarship Division of the International Communication Association. In 2020, Press became a Fellow of the International Communication Association, an honor awarded in recognition of distinguished scholarly contributions to the broad field of communication. Fellow status recognizes a documented record of scholarly achievement. In 2021, Press became the Chair of the Feminist Scholarship Division of the International Communication Association.

== Research ==
Professor Press is best known for her research addressing feminist media issues and the innovative use of qualitative methodology. Her first book, Women Watching Television: Gender, Class, and Generation in the American Television Experience, uses qualitative research methodologies to examine the cultural impact of television among women from working and middle-class backgrounds. As E. Ann Kaplan wrote in the academic journal Signs, “Andrea L. Press's book Women Watching Television is a sophisticated sociological study of class and generational differences in women's responses to television . . . Press builds on prior research through empirical investigation. She combines approaches often hitherto used separately, linking the class emphasis and the hegemony theory in much British cultural studies work with British and American feminist methods” (p. 551).

Professor Press' second book coauthored with Elizabeth R. Cole, Speaking of Abortion: Television and Authority in the Lives of Women, examines women's reactions to a television about abortion using “ethnographic focus groups.” As Nina Eliasoph noted in a review in the American Journal of Sociology, this research has broad interdisciplinary appeal, “For scholars of morality, gender, class, and media reception, the book’s intensive and clever use of interview material offers many provocative and thoughtful challenges.”

In addition to several recent articles, in 2010, Professor Press and coauthor Professor Bruce Williams published The New Media Environment: What’s New, What’s Not? (Blackwell). Professor Press' monograph MEDIA-READY FEMINISM AND EVERYDAY SEXISM: HOW U.S. AUDIENCES CREATE MEANINGS ACROSS PLATFORMS is published by SUNY Press (co-authored with Francesca Tripodi, 2021). Her co-edited collections include MEDIA AND CLASS (2017), THE ROUTLEDGE HANDBOOK OF CONTEMPORARY FEMINISM (2019), FEMINIST RECEPTION STUDIES IN A POST-AUDIENCE AGE (2018), and THE NEW FEMINIST TELEVISION STUDIES (2018). Her newest book CINEMA AND FEMINISM: A QUICK IMMERSION (co-authored with Sarah Johnson-Palomaki, 2024) addresses issues of the portrayal and development of feminist thought in popular Hollywood film.

== Contributions and significance ==
Andrea Press' intellectual concerns center on the nature of culture and the way people appropriate and recreate its meanings. In particular, she has sought to investigate how culture contributes to the reproduction of social class and gender in the contemporary U.S. Her focus on television, and now both on the new media environment and on the history of Hollywood film, derives from this interest. Media reception provides an idea site for examining the production and reproduction of a popular culture marked by gender and class distinctions. Given these interests, Press' work is inherently interdisciplinary, as scholars in many disciplines have developed definitions of culture and derived methods for studying cultural production and reproduction. Press develops and refines a qualitative, interpretive methodology for studying the active reception of popular cultural forms and for examining the role of gender and class in this process, drawing insights from several disciplines such as anthropology, philosophy, literature, and political theory. Press has explored these questions in four books projects thus far, each building on and extending the results of the last, to construct a theory of how women in particular interpret and appropriate cultural forms, and use them in understanding and creating gendered political, moral, social and cultural identities.

The first two projects focus on women's reception of television. Women Watching Television centers on the question of how women interpret television, and the related issue of how women use television to make sense of their lives and identities. Speaking of Abortion focuses more specifically on the social issue of abortion, and the way television is used creatively by small groups of women friends as they formulate and express their feelings, opinions, and convictions about the issue. While scholars in several social science disciplines have been interested in the impact of television exposure on measurable attitudes, and some in both humanities and social science fields have critically interpreted television itself from a scholarly perspective, few have looked at the way television is used by viewers as they create meanings, develop self-interpretations, and formulate and express their feelings and ideas, as Press does in these works.

In Women Watching Television, Press refines theories about television reception, about the relationship between television and culture, and about women's interpretations and uses of television. Press argues that television exerts a "class-specific" hegemony for working-class women, and a "gender-specific" hegemony for middle-class women. Thus put, her findings challenge both hegemony and what is known in cultural studies as "resistance theory"—the reigning theories of media reception dominant in critical cultural studies. In contrast to hegemony theory, which tends to offer totalizing explanations for media reception, Press' results suggest important differences in the way reception operates for different groups of women. Resistance theory is also belied by her results, since it has considered almost all viewers' interpretive activity in response to television to be resistance. Its proponents tend to downplay evidence of limits to the critical content of viewer interpretations, which her interviews illustrate. Using the evidence of in-depth interviews with women about television, Press argues that television reception is a contradictory process, one fully explained neither by the ideas of hegemony nor resistance. Women resist television at some levels, yet are susceptible to its hegemonic meanings at others. This is particularly evident in her findings about class differences in receptivity. Press found the middle-class women used television portrayals of gender relations to help solve relationship issues plaguing their own lives; often they identified with television's largely middle-class characters and families. In contrast, working-class women identified less with television characters, yet judged television portrayals and situations to be more realistic than did their middle-class counterparts. They used television to formulate their own ideas of "normal" life and found their own lives to be lacking in comparison with television's more affluent families. Thus, the working-class women were able to resist hegemonic meanings about appropriate gender roles encoded in entertainment television, while they quite uncritically appropriated many aspects of television's pictures of social class. The middle-class women, in contrast, talked more of television's images of gender role issues, and used television's treatment of these issues more uncritically as a springboard for working out their own family and work roles, often a troubled and rapidly changing part of their lives.

Women Watching Television (University of Pennsylvania) has important implications specifically for feminist theory. In particular, it helps resolve two major debates. First, Press challenges the false unity underlying the concept of "woman" by examining important differences between women; in particular, she focuses on social class and generational differences. In addition, Press challenges prior feminist theories of women's interpretations of television which generally argue that women in the postwar U.S. use television and other media products to construct autonomously their own self-identities and to express resistance to the effects of gender discrimination on their lives. Press' interview data portray a more complicated picture in which women: use television images both to reinforce and to resist traditional ideas about women's proper roles in work and family. This is most evident in her findings about generational differences between women. For the older women Press interviewed, television was a source of new ideas, particularly about women's increasing opportunities in the labor force. For the younger women, television served as a repository of nostalgic notions of the traditional family. It exacerbated their feelings about leaving their own families, often deemed imperfect according to television family images (current feminist theory has exposed this idyllic nuclear family image to be largely a creation of television and other media).

Press extends and elaborates her work investigating interpretive television reception for the female audience in a second book, Speaking of Abortion: Television and Authority in the Lives of Women (University of Chicago), co-authored with Elizabeth Cole, currently the Associate Dean of Faculty at the University of Michigan. The politically charged issue of abortion has been the focus of an ongoing public debate, as well as an issue with which most women have some private experience. In the book, Press and Cole examine non-activist women's discourse about abortion, which has been slighted in a literature focusing primarily on activists. In particular, they examine how women's views on abortion are formed in dialogue with, and against the background of, mass media discourse about the issue. Methodologically, the book extends the interpretive methodology Press used in her first book. While there she interviewed individual women about their experiences with television, here Press and Cole interview groups of women who are asked to discuss television they watch together. The research is based on focus-group discussions with supporters and opponents who were women of different social classes. To create groups, contact women were asked to organize a group of their friends, for a meeting in their home. With this methodology, Press and Cole amend traditional focus groups in an ethnographic direction, to approximate more fully the setting in which television is most often watched, and the type of public discussion in which women most often engage: they asked each group to discuss the issue of abortion, and then to view and interpret, collectively, a selected fictional television show about the issue. Using their discussions of this issue, Press and Cole explore women's views on abortion generally, focusing on the way different class and opinion groups understand distinctions between the public and the private, and how they critically interpret different presentations of this issue on entertainment television, and use these presentations in conceptualizing and expressing their own political, moral, and private positions on the issue.

Speaking of Abortion contributes to the literature about women's reception of television and the feminist literature about the relationship between the abortion debate and female morality and identity. Whereas most studies of media and public opinion overlook the political, moral, and social content of entertainment television, this book adds a dimension to the debate about the way media content is used by viewers as they interpret, understand, and formulate their views. Second, extant views of the separation of public and private spheres in modern American life ignore the particular experience of women, who are often identified with the private realm and dismissed as public actors. Press and Cole argue in this book that the public sphere for women is not absent, but exists in realms largely unexamined by current scholarship. They address the way the private realm often serves as a setting for formulating and expressing contending views about public issues, the role of television in that forum, and the particular form this debate takes for women. In this respect, the study expands the theoretical tradition established by the many feminist scholars who have challenged traditional definitions of the public/private distinction (Philosopher Nancy Fraser, historians Joan Scott and Linda Gordon, and political theorists Iris Young and Jean Elshtain, to name just a few). Finally, the feminist literature about abortion has either focused on activist women only in two polarized opinion camps (Luker, Ginsburg) or falsely generalized reasoning processes about abortion and other moral issues to all women based on samples composed primarily of middle-class women (Gilligan). In this study, Press and Cole focus on non-activist women, many of whom do not fall neatly into either opinion camp, or into the conventional definition of political actors; and, building on Press' earlier study, they emphasize the social class differences which divide the interpretations and self-conceptions of women.

Press' new projects continue her exploration of the role culture plays in the way women formulate, express, and live their identities. In The New Media Environment (Blackwell), co-authored with Bruce A. Williams, Press and Williams discuss data from a longitudinal study of the use of online tools by children of different social class backgrounds. In their forthcoming book, Media-Ready Feminism and Everyday Sexism: How U.S. Audiences Create Meaning Across Platforms Press and Tripodi draw on focus group data and textual analysis to explore the impact of second wave feminism on current thought about a series of issues including women's body image; sexuality; the "double standard"; work-family balance; and reproductive rights. Press' pieces in Slate and in the Chronicle of Higher Education , both co-edited with Francesca Tripodi, engage issues of feminism and sexism in the online community.

In addition to Press' theoretical interests, questions about the epistemological potential of qualitative and ethnographic methodology in communication studies have long been of concern in her writing and research. They have become increasingly important as she has developed and employed several different types of qualitative methods in her research. Press has written about the use of ethnographic methodology in the field of communication in the article "Toward a Qualitative Methodology of Audience Study: Using Ethnography to Study the Popular Culture Audience." A piece in the journal Feminist Media Studies and one in the journal Communication and Culture lay out theoretical concerns of interest currently to the community of feminist media studies researchers. She has also published in Contexts and in the Yale Journal of Sociology on issues of gender in high education administration. In addition Press has edited several special journal issues (with Mary Beth Haralovich on The New Feminist Television Studies, with Melissa Click on "Feminist Media Studies Today," and, in Feminist Media Studies, with Katherine Sender and Andre Cavalcante on "Feminist Media Audiences").

== Selected publications ==
=== Books ===
- Press, Andrea L., and Sarah Johnson-Palomaki. 2024. CINEMA AND FEMINISM: A QUICK IMMERSION. New York and Barcelona: Tibidabo Publishing.
- Press, Andrea L., and Francesca Tripodi. 2021. MEDIA-READY FEMINISM AND EVERYDAY SEXISM: HOW U.S. AUDIENCES CREATE MEANING ACROSS PLATFORMS. Albany: SUNY Press.
- Oren, Tasha, and Andrea L. Press, editors. 2019. THE ROUTLEDGE HANDBOOK OF CONTEMPORARY FEMINISM. London: Routledge.
- Press, Andrea L., Andre Cavalcante, Katherine Sender, editors. 2018. FEMINIST RECEPTION STUDIES IN A POST-AUDIENCE AGE. London: Routledge.
- Press, Andrea L., and Mary Ellen Brown, editors. 2018. THE NEW FEMINIST TELEVISION STUDIES. Lambert Academic Publishing.
- Press, Andrea L., and June Deery, editors. 2017. MEDIA AND CLASS: TV, FILM, AND DIGITAL CULTURE. London: Routledge.
- Press, Andrea L., and Mary Beth Haralovich, editors. 2012. The New Feminist Television Studies. London: Taylor and Francis. Special Issue of the Communication Review, 15(3).
- Press, Andrea L., and Bruce A. Williams. 2010. The New Media Environment London: Blackwell. (*Translated into Egyptian Arabic.)
- Press, Andrea L., and Elizabeth R. Cole. 1999. Speaking of Abortion: Television and Authority in the Lives of Women. Chicago: University of Chicago Press.
- Press, A. L. 1991. Women Watching Television: Gender, Class, and Generation in the American Television Experience. Philadelphia: University of Pennsylvania Press.*

- Nominated for the JESSIE BERNARD AWARD of the American Sociological Association.

=== Edited journal issues ===
- Press, Andrea L., Andre Cavalcante, Katherine Sender, editors. 2017. Feminist Media Audiences. Co-editing special issue of the journal Feminist Media Studies. Volume 17, No. 1.
- Press, Andrea L., and Melissa Click, editors. 2014. Feminist Media Studies Today. Special issue of the Communication Review, based on the 2014 Console-ing Passions Keynote speakers and Panels.
- Press, Andrea L., and Mary Beth Haralovich, editors. 2012. The New Feminist Television Studies. London: Taylor and Francis. Special Issue of the Communication Review, 15(3).
- Press, Andrea L., and Arlene Stein, editors. 2008. Commemorating the Barnard Conference. London: Taylor and Francis. Special Issue of the Communication Review, 11(3).
- Press, Andrea L., editor. 2006. Audience Research in the Post-Audience Age. London: Taylor and Francis. Special issue of the Communication Review, 2006 9(2).

=== Books in development ===
- Press, Andrea L. How Feminist is the Media? Contract being negotiated, Polity Press.

=== Articles ===
- Press, Andrea L., and Marjorie Rosen. 2017. June Deery and Andrea Press, Editors, Media and Class. Routledge.
- Press, Andrea L., and Ellen Rosenman. 2016. “Consumerism and the Languages of Class.” In Timothy Shary and Frances Smith, editors, Refocus on Amy Heckerling. Edinburgh: Edinburgh University Press. pp. 77–96.
- Press, Andrea L., Fan Mai, Francesca Tripodi, and Mike Wayne. 2016. “Audiences.” The Encyclopedia of the Social Sciences. Oxford: Elsevier. pp. 216–222.
- Press, Andrea L.; Tripodi, Francesca (2015), "Feminism in a postfeminist world: who's hot – and why we care – on the Collegiate 'anonymous confession board'", in Steiner, Linda; Carter, Cynthia; McLaughlin, Lisa (eds.), The Routledge companion to media & gender, London New York: Routledge, pp. 543–553, ISBN 9781138849129.
- Press, Andrea L., and Laura Grindstaff. 2014. “Too Little But Not Too Late: Sociological Contributions to Feminist Media Studies.” pp. 151–167 in Media Sociology: A Reappraisal., edited by Silvio Waisbord. London: Polity.
- Press, Andrea L. 2014. “Fractured Feminism: Articulations of Feminism, Sex and Class by Reality TV Viewers.” pp. 208–227 in A Companion to Reality Television, edited by Laurie Ouellette. London: Blackwell.
- Press, Andrea. 2013. “Fractured Feminism” [J]. Translated into Chinese by Kewen Ding, China Book Review, No.3: 42–48, as (美)安德烈拉·普瑞斯.“碎裂的女性主义”[J].丁珂文译. 中国图书评论(辽宁).
- Press, Andrea L. 2012. “Sex, Gender, and the 2012 Struggle over the Presidency of the University of Virginia.” Yale Journal of Sociology. Fall, 2012.
- Press, Andrea L. 2012. “Faculty Governance Under Siege.” Contexts. Fall, 2012.
- Press, Andrea L. 2012. “The Price of Motherhood: Feminism and Cultural Bias.” Communication, Culture and Critique 5:119-124.
- Press, Andrea L. 2011. “Feminism and Media in the Post-Feminist Era: What to make of the “Feminist” in Feminist Media Studies.” Feminist Media Studies 11(1): 107-114. (Reprinted as Press, Andrea L. (2013), "Feminism and media in the post-feminist era: what to make of the "Feminist" in feminist media studies", in Carter, Cynthia; McLaughlin, Lisa (eds.), Current perspectives in feminist media studies, London New York: Routledge, ISBN 9780415540117.)
- Press, Andrea L. (2011), "Feminism? That's so Seventies!", in Gill, Rosalind; Scharff, Christina M. (eds.), New femininities: postfeminism, neoliberalism, and subjectivity, Houndmills, Basingstoke, Hampshire New York: Palgrave Macmillan, pp. 117–133, ISBN 9780230223349.
- Press, Andrea L. 2009. “Gender and Family in Television’s Golden Age and Beyond.” Annals of the American Academy of Political and Social Science 625(1): 139–150.
- Press, Andrea L. 2008. “Feminist Media Studies and the Sexuality Debates.” Communication Review, 11(3): 195–198.
- Press, Andrea L. 2007. “Do We Want a Model of Reception Research?” Communication Review Volume 10, No. 3, 2007, pp. 179–181.
- Press, Andrea L., and Camille Johnson-Yale. 2007. “Political Talk and the Flow of Ambient Television: Women Watching OPRAH in an African-American Hair Salon.” pp. 1–29 in James Schwoch and Phil Goldstein, editors, Reception Study. New York: Oxford University Press.
- Press, Andrea L. 2006. “Audience Research in the Post-Audience Age.” Communication Review, 9, No. 2, 93–100.
- Press, Andrea L. 2006. "Gender and Culture." Culture Section, Encyclopedia of Sociology, edited by George Ritzer. Oxford: Blackwell, pp. 936–942.
- Press, Andrea L., and Sonia Livingstone. 2006. “Taking Audience Research Into the Age of New Media: Old Problems and New Challenges.” pp. 175–200 in Mimi White, James Schwoch, and Dilip Goankar, editors, Cultural Studies and Methodological Issues. London: Basil Blackwell.
- Press, Andrea L., and Bruce A. Williams. 2005. “Fame and Everyday Life: The “Lottery Celebrity” of Reality TV.” Pp. 176-190 in Mark D. Jacobs and Nancy Weiss Hanrahan, editors, The Blackwell Companion to the Sociology of Culture. New York and London: Blackwell.
- Press, Andrea L., and Tamar Liebes. 2004. “Feminism and Hollywood: Why the Backlash?” Media Report to Women, Winter, 2004.
- Press, Andrea L., and Tamar Liebes. 2003. “Feminism and Hollywood: Whatever Happened to the Golden Age?" pp. 1–31 in James Curran and Nick Couldry, editors, Contesting Media Power. Boulder, Co: Rowman and Littlefield.
- Press, Andrea L. 2002. “Audiences.” The Encyclopedia of the Social Sciences, edited by Neil Smelser (Communication Section edited by Michael Schudson).
- Press, Andrea L., and Linda Blum. 2001. "What Can We Hear After Postmodernism? The Growing Gulf Between Cultural Studies and Feminist Research." pp. 182–221 in Across Disciplines and Beyond Boundaries: Tracking American Cultural Studies, edited by Cat Warren, Mary Vavrus, and Eve Munson. Urbana: University of Illinois Press.
- Press, Andrea L. 2001. "Studying the Female Popular Culture Audience." The Women's Studies Encyclopedia, edited by Cheris Kramarae and Dale Spender. New York and London: Simon and Schuster International Press.
- Press, Andrea L. 2000. “Recent Developments in Feminist Communication Theory: Difference, Public Sphere, Body and Technology.” pp. 27–44 in Mass Media and Society, edited by James Curran and Michael Gurevitch. London and New York: Routledge.
- Press, Andrea L. 1996. "Toward a Qualitative Methodology of Audience Study: Using Ethnography to Study the Popular Cultural Audience." pp. 113–130 in The Audience and Its Landscape, edited by James Hay, Larry Grossberg, and Ellen Wartella. Boulder, CO: Westview Press.
- Press, Andrea L., and Elizabeth Cole. 1995. "Reconciling Faith and Fact: Pro-Life Women Discuss Media, Science and the Abortion Debate." Critical Studies in Mass Communication, 12(4):380-402.
- Press, Andrea L. "Women Watching Television." 1995. pp. 17–54 in Transmission, edited by David Tofler and Peter d'Agostino. Newbury Park, CA: SAGE.
- Press, Andrea L., and Elizabeth R. Cole. 1994. "Women Like Us: Working-Class Women Respond to Television Representations of Abortion." pp. 55–80 in Reading, Viewing, Listening: Audiences and Cultural Reception, edited by Jon Cruz and Justin Lewis. Boulder, CO: Westview Press.
- Press, Andrea L. 1994. "The Sociology of Cultural Reception: Notes Toward an Emerging Paradigm." pp. 221–246 in Emerging Theoretical Perspectives in the Sociology of Culture, edited by Diana Crane. England: Basil Blackwell.
- Press, Andrea L., and Terry Strathman. 1993. "Work, Family, and Social Class in Television Images of Women: Prime-Time Television and the Construction of Postfeminism." Women and Language 16(2):7-15.
- Press, Andrea L., and Elizabeth R. Cole. 1992. "Pro-Choice Voices: Discourses of Abortion Among Pro-Choice Women." Perspectives on Social Problems.4:73-92.
- Press, Andrea L. 1992. "The Active Viewer and the Problem of Interpretation: Reconciling Traditional and Critical Research." Communication Yearbook 15: 91–106.
- Press, Andrea L. 1991. "Working-Class Women in a Middle-Class World: The Impact of Television on Modes of Reasoning About Abortion." Critical Studies in Mass Communication 8(4):421-441.
- Press, Andrea L. 1990. "Class, Gender, and the Female Viewer: Women's Responses to Dynasty." pp. 158–182 in Television and Women's Culture, edited by Mary Ellen Brown. Newbury Park, CA: SAGE. (*Reprinted in Polish, 2012).
- Press, Andrea L. 1989. "The Ongoing Feminist Revolution." Critical Studies in Mass Communication 6(2):196-202.
- Press, Andrea L. 1989. "Class and Gender in the Hegemonic Process: Class Differences in Women's Perceptions of Television Realism and Identification with Television Characters." Media, Culture, and Society 11(2):229-252.
- Press, Andrea L. 1986. "New Views on the Mass Production of Women's Culture." Communication Research 13(1):139-150.
- Press, Andrea L. 1986. "Ideologies of Femininity: Film and Popular Consciousness in the Postwar Era." pp. 313–323 in Media, Audience and Social Structure, edited by Sandra Ball-Rokeach and Muriel Cantor. Newbury Park, CA: SAGE.

=== Review essays ===
- Press, Andrea L. 1993. "Feminist Methodology? A Reassessment." Contemporary Sociology 22(1):23-30.
- Press, Andrea L., and Arlene Stein. 1985. "Pleasure and Danger: Exploring Female Sexuality." Berkeley Journal of Sociology XXX:205-212.

=== Other publications ===
- Press, Andrea L., and Francesca Tripodi. 2014. “The New Misogyny” Chronicle of Higher Education, Chronicle Blog. July 2, 2014.
- Press, Andrea L., and Francesca Tripodi. 2014. “What We Found While Lurking on an Anonymous College Message Board for Two Years” SLATE, June 5, 2014.
- Press, Andrea L., and Bruce A. Williams. 1997. “Mass Media and the Boundaries of Public and Private Life.” Perspectives: The American Sociological Association Theory Section Newsletter 19(3): 7–9.
- Press, Andrea L. 1992. "Television and the Political Culture of Abortion." Newsletter of the Sociology of Culture Section of the American Sociological Association 6(3):12-15.
- Press, Andrea L. 1992. "Working-Class Women Respond to the Primacy of Class in Television Representations of Abortion." Paper available as Working Paper #82 in the Working Paper Series sponsored by the Center for the Study of Social Transformations (CSST), University of Michigan, Ann Arbor, MI.
- Williams, Bruce A., and Andrea L. Press. 1992. "Perot and Fascism." Op-Ed piece published in the Christian Science Monitor, September. (One page).
