= Green Party of Canada =

Federal political party

Green Party of Canada Parti vert du Canada
- Abbreviation: GPC; PVC
- Leader: Mike Morrice
- Parliamentary leader: Elizabeth May
- Deputy leader: Rainbow Eyes (Angela Davidson)
- Chair: Anne-Marie Zajdlik
- Executive Director: Robin Marty
- Founded: 4 November 1983; 43 years ago
- Headquarters: 116 Albert Street; Suite 812; Ottawa, Ontario
- Youth wing: Young Greens of Canada
- Membership (2025): ▼9,877
- Ideology: Green politics; Factions: Eco-capitalism; Eco-socialism
- Continental affiliation: Federation of the Green Parties of the Americas
- International affiliation: Global Greens
- Colours: Green
- Slogan: Change. Vote for it (2025)
- Senate: 0 / 105
- House of Commons: 1 / 343

Website
- greenparty.ca/en

The Green Party of Canada (GPC; French: Parti vert du Canada, PVC) is a federal political party in Canada, founded in 1983 with a focus on green politics.

The Green Party is currently the fifth largest party in the House of Commons by seat count. It elected its first member of Parliament (MP), leader Elizabeth May, in the 2011 election, winning in Saanich—Gulf Islands. In the 2019 election, the party expanded its caucus to three. In the 2021 election, the party fell to two seats. In the 2025 election, the party fell to one seat.

Elizabeth May served as the party leader from 2006 to 2019, and again since November 19, 2022. On February 4, 2025, the party ratified a motion to adopt a co-leadership model, with May and Jonathan Pedneault serving together as the first co-leaders of the party. Pedneault resigned as co-leader after less than three months in that position, leaving May once again as the party's sole leader.

The Green Party is founded on six principles: ecological wisdom, non-violence, social justice, sustainability, participatory democracy, and respect for diversity.

== History ==
About two months before the 1980 federal election, eleven candidates, mostly from ridings in the Atlantic provinces, issued a joint press release declaring that they were running on a common platform. It called for a transition to a non-nuclear, conserver society. Although they ran as independents, they unofficially used the name "Small Party" as part of their declaration of unity, a reference to the "small is beautiful" philosophy of E. F. Schumacher. This was the most substantial early attempt to answer the call for an ecologically oriented Canadian political party. A key organizer (and one of the candidates) was Elizabeth May, who later became leader of the Greens in 2006.

The Green Party of Canada was founded at a conference held at Carleton University in Ottawa on November 4, 1983. Under its first leader, Trevor Hancock, the party ran 60 candidates in the 1984 Canadian federal election.

The Quebec wing hosted the 1990 Canadian Greens conference in Montreal. Soon after, Canada's constitutional problems interfered; as a result, many Quebec candidates abandoned the Greens in favour of a Quebec sovereigntist party, the Bloc Québécois. There were only six Green candidates from Quebec in the 1993 election. In the spring of 1996, although the hopes of electing a representative to the BC legislature proved premature, Andy Shadrack in the interior of the province received over 11% of the vote. Overall, the party's proportion of the popular vote surged to a new high. Shadrack was also the most popular Green candidate in the 1997 federal election, scoring over 6% of the popular vote in West Kootenay—Okanagan.

=== Joan Russow years ===
British Columbia's Joan Russow became leader of the Green Party of Canada on April 13, 1997. Russow won 52% of the ballots cast in the 1997 leadership race, surpassing Ontario's Jim Harris (39%) and Rachelle Small (8%). Immediately upon attaining the leadership, Russow was plunged into a federal general election. Russow's campaign in 1997 set a number of important precedents. The 1997 federal election was the first campaign in which the Greens conducted a national leader's tour, presented a national platform and a bilingual campaign. Previous campaigns, due in part to the party's few resources and, in part, to the party's constitutional straitjacket, had been characterized by policy and spokespeople operating, at best, province-by-province and, at worst, riding-by-riding. In her own riding of Victoria, Russow received just shy of 3000 votes and 6% of the popular vote.

In 1998, the party adopted a rule that forbids membership in any other federal political party. This was intended to prevent the party from being taken over. A small number of Greens who advocate the more cooperative approach to legislation objected to the rule not to hold cross-memberships, a tool they occasionally employed.

Since its inception, the party has been developing as an organization, expanding its membership and improving its showing at the polls. In the 2000 federal election, the party fielded 111 candidates, up from 78 in 1997.

Candidates were not run in Newfoundland and Labrador, as a result of ongoing divisions over Joan Russow's refusal to endorse the Green candidate in an earlier St. John's West by-election. (The candidate in question supported the seal hunt and mining development, as most locals did.) This caused much uncertainty and friction between Newfoundland's Terra Nova Green Party Association and the Green Party leader as the party gradually adapted to the realities of functioning as a true national party rather than a disorganized federation of local activists.

The conflicts left Russow isolated and alienated from most members of the party. Volunteer efforts were substantially absorbed in provincial campaigns between 2001 and 2003, and the federal party became dormant between elections, as was typical in the past. Chris Bradshaw served the party as interim leader from 2001 to February 2003. During his term, the party ended its sharing of office and staff with the Ontario party, establishing its own office in the national capital of Ottawa.

Russow left the party in 2001 and later criticized the Green Party for not following their policies. She re-joined the party in 2020 to support Dimitri Lascaris' campaign for the Green Party leadership.

=== Breakthrough under Jim Harris ===
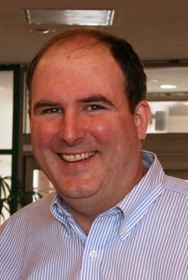
Jim Harris, leader of the party from 2003 to 2006

In February 2003, Jim Harris, in his second bid for the leadership, defeated John Grogan of Valemount, British Columbia, and Jason Crummey. Crummey was originally from Newfoundland and involved with Newfoundland and Labrador Terra Nova Greens.

During the 2004 federal election, the Green Party of Canada became the fourth federal political party ever to run candidates in all the ridings. When the ballots were counted, the Green Party secured 4.3% of the popular vote, thereby surpassing the 2% threshold required for party financing under new Elections Canada rules.

Momentum continued to build around the Green Party of Canada and in the 2006 federal election the Green Party again ran 308 candidates and increased its share of the popular vote to 4.5%, once again securing federal financing as a result.

The party's 2006 election campaign was disrupted by allegations made by Matthew Pollesell, the party's former assistant national organizer, that Harris had not filed a proper accounting of money spent during his 2004 leadership campaign, as required by law. Pollesell issued a request that Elections Canada investigate. Pollesell and another former party member, Gretchen Schwarz, were subsequently warned by the party's legal counsel to retract allegations they had made or face a possible legal action. Dana Miller, who served in the party's shadow cabinet with responsibility for human-rights issues, made public her earlier complaints that the party has violated election law and its own constitution and has also asked for an Elections Canada investigation. Miller had been expelled from the party after filing a complaint within the party in April.

Some opponents of Harris's leadership of the Green Party formed the rival Peace and Ecology Party, which presumably disbanded after he stepped down as leader.

=== Arrival of Elizabeth May ===
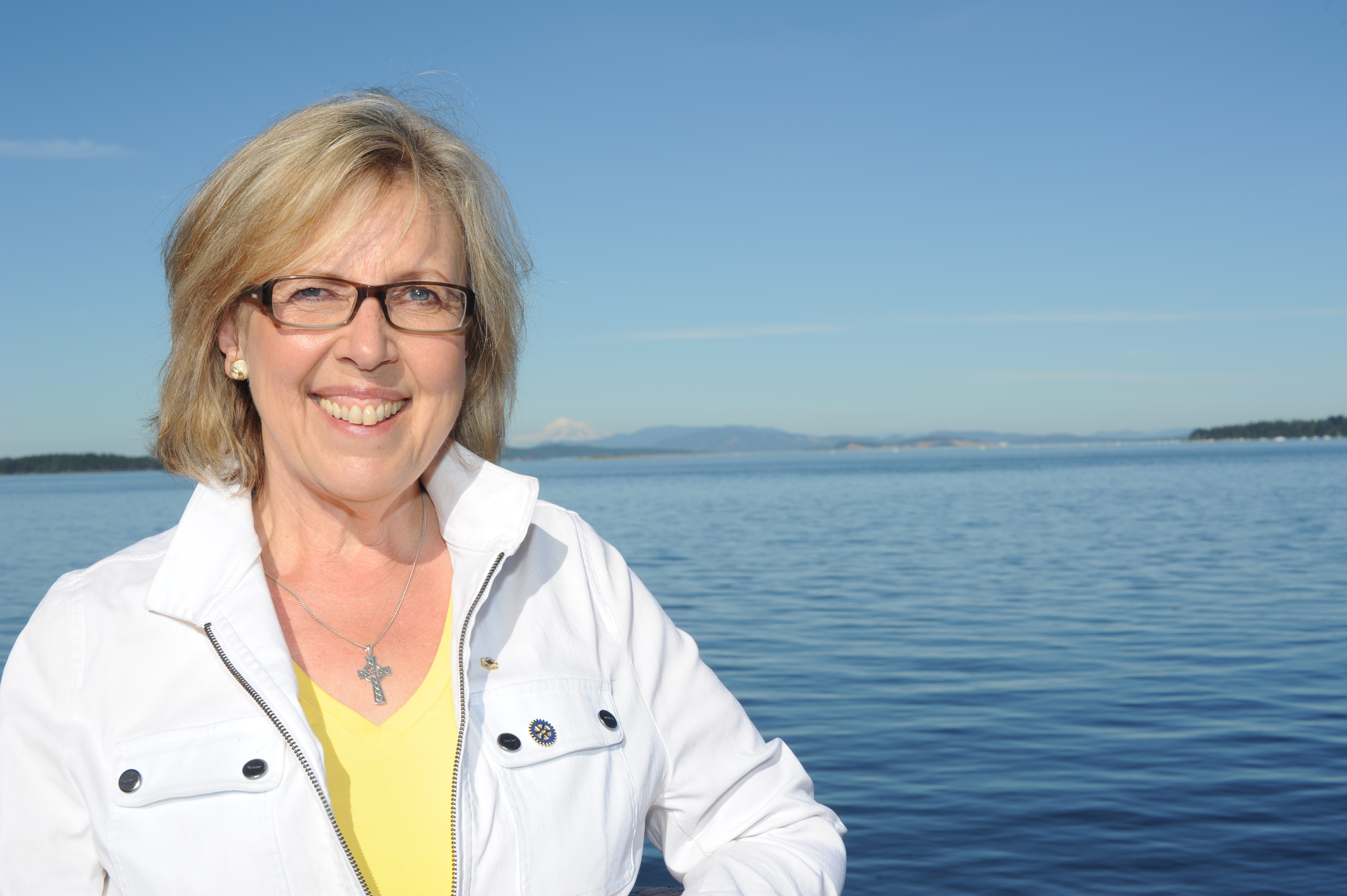
Elizabeth May, July 2014

A leadership vote was held at the party's August 2006 convention. On April 24, 2006, Jim Harris announced his intention not to stand for re-election as party leader. Three candidates officially entered the leadership race: David Chernushenko, Elizabeth May, and Jim Fannon. May won the leadership with 65% of the vote on the first ballot.

On October 22, 2006, Elizabeth May announced she would run in the federal by-election to be held on November 27, 2006, in London North Centre, Ontario. She finished second behind the Liberal candidate, but garnered 26% of the popular vote.

Even though it had never held a seat, Elizabeth May's Green Party began to receive more mainstream media attention on other party policy not directly related to the environment – for example, supporting labour rights and poppy legalization in Afghanistan.

On August 30, 2008, Vancouver area MP Blair Wilson became the first-ever Green member of Parliament, after sitting for nearly a year of the 39th Canadian Parliament as an independent. He had been a Liberal MP but stepped down voluntarily from the caucus earlier in the Parliament after anonymous allegations of campaign finance irregularities, most of which he was later cleared after a 9-month investigation by Elections Canada. Wilson had joined the Green Party during Parliament's summer recess and never sat in the House of Commons as a Green MP.

After initial opposition from three of the four major political parties, May was invited to the leaders' debates; this was a first for the party. In the 2008 federal election, the party increased its share of the popular vote by 2.33% (to 6.80%), being the only federally funded party to increase its total vote tally over 2006, attracting nearly 280,000 new votes. However, the party failed to elect a candidate. Some prominent Green Party members blamed the public discussion of strategic voting and the media's misrepresentation of May's comments during the election campaign for the failure of some promising candidates to reach Election Canada's 10% reimbursement threshold, as well as reducing the party's federal funding based on popular vote.

On August 11, 2010, 74% of Green Party members voted to hold a leadership review after the next election, instead of in August 2010, which was when May's four-year term as leader was set to end.

=== Greens in Parliament ===
On May 2, 2011, May became the first elected Green Party MP to sit in the House of Commons. She won the riding of Saanich—Gulf Islands in coastal British Columbia. In winning her seat, May also became one of the few Greens worldwide to be elected in a federal, single-seat election. On 13 December 2013, Thunder Bay—Superior North MP Bruce Hyer, who had left the New Democratic Party (NDP) in 2012 to sit as an independent after breaking party lines to vote in favour of a repeal of the Long Gun Registry, joined the party, resulting in a record two-member caucus in Parliament.

Results of the 2015 Canadian federal election showing support for Green candidates by riding

In August 2014, party president-elect Paul Estrin published a blog post on the Green Party's website criticizing the actions of Hamas during the 2014 Israel–Gaza conflict. In his article, "Why Gaza Makes Me Sad", Estrin talked about Hamas' "desire to obliterate" the State of Israel and how the terrorist group uses children as human shields. Estrin's blog post was subsequently deleted by the party, with many party seniors and decision makers, including Elizabeth May, distancing themselves from Estrin, with a large majority of the party calling on him to resign. On August 5, Estrin resigned, criticizing the party for betraying their commitment to values of inclusivity and open public discourse. Elizabeth May accepted the resignation of Estrin, stating that he was not forced to resign, but did so of his own volition. May has said that the problem with his statements were the "confusion" they caused because they differed from party lines, but confirmed that Estrin was indeed a "true Green".

In the lead up to the federal election on October 19, 2015, José Núñez-Melo joined the Green Party. Núñez-Melo, first elected in 2011 as a New Democrat in the riding of Laval, was barred by the NDP from seeking re-nomination after he publicly criticized the nomination process; after the dropping of the writ, Núñez-Melo announced he would run for re-election in Vimy as a Green Party candidate. As Parliament was dissolved for the election at the time of Núñez-Melo's change in affiliation, he was never formally recorded as a Green MP. Ultimately, May was re-elected in the riding of Saanich—Gulf Islands while both Hyer and Núñez-Melo were defeated, leaving May as the only member in the House.

In March 2018, Green Party leader Elizabeth May appointed journalist and broadcaster Jo-Ann Roberts as a deputy leader along with environmentalist Daniel Green of Montreal. Roberts ran as Green Party candidate in a Victoria, British Columbia, riding during the 2015 federal election and finished second.

On May 6, 2019, Paul Manly became the second MP elected under the party's banner, after winning a by-election in Nanaimo—Ladysmith. On 19 August 2019, a former NDP and briefly Independent MP Pierre Nantel joined the Green Party during the Parliament's summer recess.

During the 2019 federal election, both May and Manly were re-elected while Jenica Atwin was elected in her New Brunswick riding of Fredericton—Oromocto, making her the third elected Green MP in the federal parliament, and the first Green MP outside of British Columbia.

During the 2021 federal election, Mike Morrice was elected in Kitchener Centre, becoming the first Green MP elected in Ontario, and second Green MP outside of British Columbia, as well the former leader May was re-elected. However, Manly was defeated in Nanaimo—Ladysmith. In addition, Atwin won re-election, but only after crossing the floor as a Liberal candidate.

=== Division under Annamie Paul ===
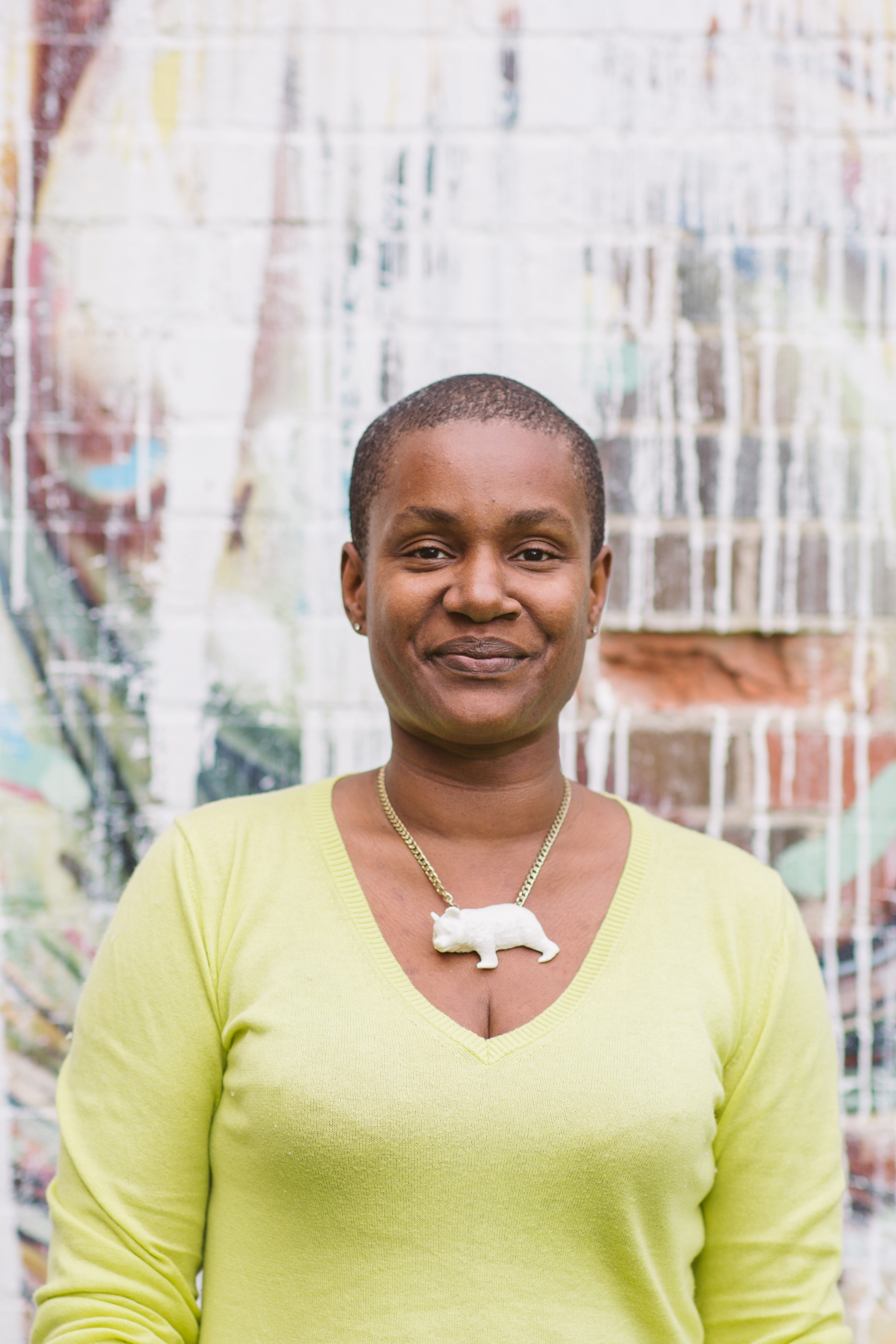
Party Leader Annamie Paul (2020–2021)

On November 4, 2019, May announced she would be stepping down as leader of the Green Party of Canada. May continued to act as parliamentary leader and sit as a Green member of Parliament. The decision to step down came as a promise to May's daughter. A leadership election was held on 3 October 2020, and Toronto-based lawyer and activist Annamie Paul was elected to succeed Elizabeth May as Green Party leader. At the time, Annamie Paul had been described as a centrist.

Paul ran in the 2020 Toronto Centre federal by-election, where she placed second.

On June 10, 2021, Jenica Atwin crossed the floor, leaving the Green caucus to join the Liberal caucus. This came shortly after a public rift over the Israeli–Palestinian conflict. Atwin had criticized party leader Paul's statement on the matter following Israeli airstrikes as "inadequate", which in turn prompted an advisor to Paul, Noah Zatzman, to vow to replace Atwin with a "Zionist" candidate. In a Facebook post, Zatzman stated: "We will work to defeat you and bring in progressive climate champions who are antifa and pro LGBT and pro indigenous sovereignty and Zionists!!!!!” Atwin cited "distractions" in the Green Party as a factor in her departure. The Green federal council subsequently passed a motion calling for Paul to repudiate Zatzman for his statements towards Atwin and other Green MPs, of which Paul refused to act on. Following Atwin's defection, the remaining two Green MPs, Elizabeth May and Paul Manly, reaffirmed their commitment to their party and expressed their disappointment, stating "the attack against Ms. Atwin by the Green party leader's chief spokesperson on May 14 created the conditions that led to this crisis".

In the 2021 election, the party's share of the vote fell to its lowest amount in 21 years. As well, the Green Party ran candidates in only 252 of the country's 338 ridings; limited resources and staff layoffs hampered any attempt at a co-ordinated countrywide campaign, which also lacked a national director during all five weeks of election campaigning. A week after the election, Paul announced her intention to resign as leader.

According to reporting by The Tyee, Paul confronted the federal council following her statement to intend to resign. She allegedly asked the council “How many of you think I resigned today?” and following her statement with "Well, I didn't. I just started the process of my resignation." Paul allegedly told Elizabeth May "not to talk to the media" regarding her exit, but May ignored her request and stated that Paul was "creating chaos". May, talking with The Tyee, stated that Paul was resistant to leave the building, and continued to control the party's communications. She cited an instance of an associate of Paul blocking Lorraine Rekmans, an Indigenous woman, from making a statement regarding the National Day for Truth and Reconciliation, and writing a statement instead. An internal report of the Green Party obtained by The Globe and Mail stated: "there is systemic racism at the governance level of the party, which needs to be, but is not being, addressed". Former leader Jim Harris was critical of Paul's statements on her experiences of racism within the Green Party and dismissed the existence of issues of systemic racism within the party, stating: "When she doesn't get her way, she calls racism. Now, racism, sexism, and violent metaphors like 'walking over shards of glass' and 'spitting up blood' get headlines, but what we have to judge a leader by is their performance." A member of the Greens' federal council, Louise Comeau, stepped down following the internal turmoil, citing "[the] stress and anxiety of those meetings affected [her] physical and mental health", with regards to negotiations surrounding Paul's departure. May theorized Paul wished to negotiate a severance package before her departure as Green leader.

On October 28, 2021, Green members received a leadership review ballot regarding Paul's continued status as leader. Several days later, Paul told a press conference she was surprised by the review, and that it was unnecessary since she had previously announced her intention to resign. Paul's protracted departure was due to continued legal conflict between Paul and the Green Party's leadership, with Paul negotiating compensation for legal fees incurred due to arbitration following a previous attempt to remove Paul as leader. Paul officially resigned on November 10, 2021, as voting in the review was ongoing. Her resignation took effect on November 14, 2021, upon its acceptance by the party's federal council.

==== Aftermath ====
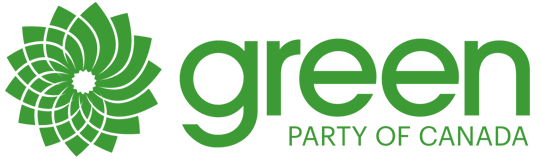
Party logo until 2025

On November 24, 2021, Amita Kuttner was appointed interim leader. Appointed at the age of 30, Kuttner was the youngest person to lead a federal political party, as well as the first transgender person and person of East Asian heritage.

The party's constitution required a leadership election to select a permanent leader to begin within six months of the appointment of an interim leader, and conclude within two years of their appointment. Kuttner had said that they did not wish to be the permanent leader. In December 2021, Kuttner said that they believed there should be a "longer period before launching a permanent leadership contest, and then a short leadership race."

In a press conference about a week after their appointment, Kuttner said they wanted to start the process of regrowth and to heal the party. The party had released a report indicating that it was threatened with insolvency, and was considering closing its office in Ottawa. The party had lost 499 monthly donors since July 2021, and 6,259 members in the same time. Kuttner acknowledged internal conflict over Annamie Paul's leadership had affected donations. The report also blamed negotiations concerning Annamie Paul's departure as leader of the party for significant legal costs. In a December 2021 media interview, Kuttner said that the party's financial position was getting "back on track" and was "turning around" pointing to fundraising including at the party's virtual general meeting about a week earlier.

On September 11, 2022, the president of the party, Lorraine Rekmans, announced her resignation. She was very critical of the party and the candidates in the ongoing leadership race, stating "The dream is dead." She was succeeded as party president by Ian Soutar.

=== Return of Elizabeth May and co-leadership ===
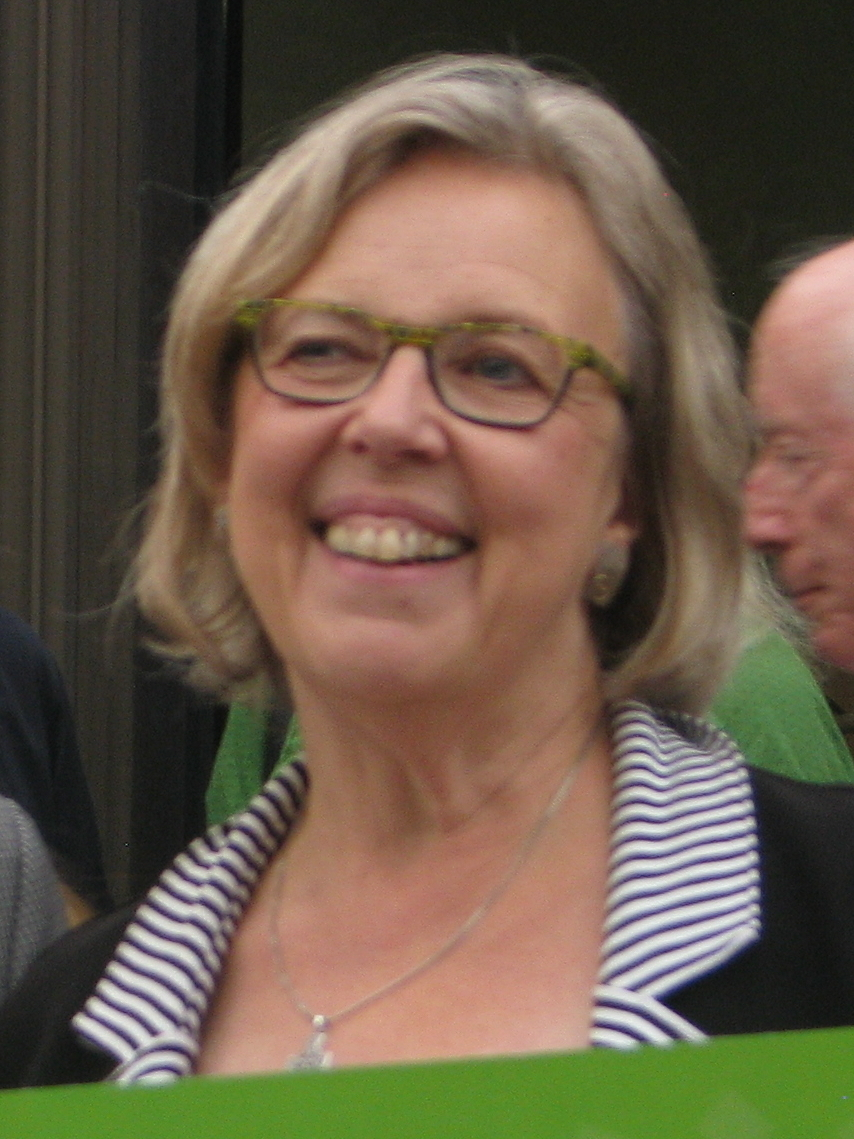
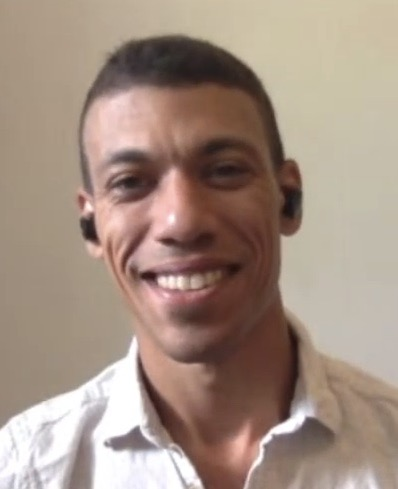
Co-leaders Elizabeth May and Jonathan Pedneault

On November 19, 2022, Elizabeth May was elected leader of the party once again, promising to convert the current leadership model into a co-leadership model, with Jonathan Pedneault being her co-leader. May ran with Pedneault in the leadership race, and Pedneault served as the deputy leader of the party. In February 2024, party members were to vote on motions which, if passed, would have amended the party's constitution to implement a co-leadership model. However, Pedneault was unsuccessful in his attempt to win a seat in the House of Commons through a byelection and the proposed constitutional amendment was not voted upon due to disagreement within the party. On July 9, 2024, Jonathan Pedneault resigned as deputy leader, citing personal reasons. He returned in January 2025 to serve as co-leader, pending election by party membership, which was approved on February 4, 2025. The party unveiled its new logo on February 18, its first rebrand in 25 years.

Jonathan Pedneault spoke to the press the morning of April 16, 2025, after the Green Party's invitation to a debate scheduled for the same evening was withdrawn. The Leaders' Debate Commission said the Party was disqualified for "strategically" dropping the number of its candidates from 343 to 232 before the 2025 Canadian federal election. "Parties that deliberately reduce candidate numbers, limit voters' choices and undermine the premise that a national debate includes truly national parties," it stated. Pedneault called the decision "undemocratic." In the election, the party was once again reduced to 1 seat (Saanich—Gulf Islands), and a further decreased popular vote of just over 1%. Pedneault resigned as co-leader two days after the election, taking responsibility for the party's dismal electoral results. On August 19, May announced her intention to resign as party leader before the next federal election.

=== Leadership of Mike Morrice ===
In the ensuing leadership election, former Green MP Mike Morrice and party activist Nira Dookeran entered as candidates, with Dookeran withdrawing prior to the voting period. Morrice was elected leader on November 14, 2026, obtaining 96.6% support against None of the Above.

== Principles and policies ==
=== Political position ===
The Green Party officially rejects the traditional left–right political spectrum, describing it as "something of an anachronism". Instead, the Green Party believes that "voters in modern democracies [are] divided on lines … more to do with 'insiders' and 'outsiders.'" According to co-founder and former leader Trevor Hancock, "the perennial left vs. right squabbling about who gets to control and benefit from the ever-expanding pie is to completely miss the point; the pie cannot continue to expand, indeed it must contract … the struggle for social justice is deeply rooted in the fact that the limits to growth requires a radical global and societal redistribution of the Earth’s limited resources." In 2019, the Green Party under Elizabeth May ran on a campaign slogan of "Not Left. Not Right. Forward Together."

The party is noted as having a wide range of internal factions; the 2020 leadership election saw both self-described moderate and eco-socialist candidates. Writing in Maclean's, Anne Kingston described the party as an "ideological hybrid", combining left-leaning views on social issues and welfare with a right-leaning embrace of market solutions and tax shifting. In another article, Matt Gurney concurred with that description; he also said that "in practice", the Greens are "simply another centre-left party". Other political commentators, such as Andrew Coyne, Chantal Hébert and Heather Mallick, identify the party as being on the left.

The party has also been described as populists, more adjacent to the left.

=== Principles ===
The Green Party of Canada is founded on six key principles that were adopted at the 2002 convention of the Global Greens. These principles are:

- Ecological wisdom
- Non-violence
- Social justice
- Sustainability
- Participatory democracy
- Respect for diversity

== Members of Parliament ==
Name	Riding	Province/territory	Green MP from	Green MP until	Predecessor	Crossed the floor
Mike Morrice	Kitchener Centre	Ontario	September 20, 2021	March 23, 2025	Raj Saini	No
Jenica Atwin	Fredericton	New Brunswick	October 21, 2019	June 10, 2021	Matt DeCourcey	Yes, left caucus (to Liberals)
Paul Manly	Nanaimo—Ladysmith	British Columbia	May 6, 2019	September 20, 2021	Sheila Malcolmson	No
Bruce Hyer	Thunder Bay—Superior North	Ontario	December 13, 2013	August 4, 2015	Joe Comuzzi	Yes, joined caucus (from NDP)
Elizabeth May	Saanich—Gulf Islands	British Columbia	May 2, 2011	present	Gary Lunn	No
Blair Wilson	West Vancouver—Sunshine Coast—Sea to Sky Country	British Columbia	August 30, 2008	October 14, 2008	John Reynolds	Yes, joined caucus (from Liberals)

=== Members who joined after parliament's dissolution ===
Name	Riding	Green MP from	Green MP until	Province/territory	Predecessor	Crossed the floor
José Núñez-Melo	Laval	August 16, 2015	October 18, 2015	Quebec	Nicole Demers	Yes (the NDP dropped him as a candidate). He ran for the Greens but lost to Liberal candidate Eva Nassif

Name	Riding	Independent MP from	Independent MP until	Province/territory	Predecessor	Crossed the floor
Pierre Nantel	Longueuil—Saint-Hubert	August 19, 2019	October 20, 2019	Quebec	Jean Dorion	No, but ran as a Green and lost to Bloc candidate Denis Trudel

== Leadership ==
=== Party leaders ===
Leader	Term start	Term end
Trevor Hancock	1983	1984
Seymour Trieger	1984	1988
Kathryn Cholette	1988	1990
Chris Lea	1990	1996
Wendy Priesnitz	1996	1997
Harry Garfinkle (interim)	1997	1997
Joan Russow	1997	2001
Chris Bradshaw (interim)	2001	2003
Jim Harris	2003	2006
Elizabeth May	2006	2019
Jo-Ann Roberts (interim)	2019	2020
Annamie Paul	2020	2021
Amita Kuttner (interim)	2021	2022
Elizabeth May	2022	2026
Jonathan Pedneault	2025 (Note: While May and Pedneault campaigned together during the 2022 leadership election, saying the two intended to be co-leaders, the party did not formally adopt a co-leadership model until 2025. Pedneault served as deputy leader 2022–2024.)	2025
Mike Morrice	2026	present

=== Deputy party leaders ===
Deputy leader	Leader(s)	Term start	Term end
Andrew Lewis	Jim Harris	2004	26 August 2006
Tom Manley	Jim Harris	2004	23 September 2005
Adriane Carr	Elizabeth May	21 November 2006	22 January 2014
Claude Genest	Elizabeth May	21 November 2006	24 November 2009
Jacques Rivard	Elizabeth May	24 November 2009	July 2010
Georges Laraque	Elizabeth May	31 July 2010	17 October 2013
Bruce Hyer	Elizabeth May	27 January 2014	19 March 2018
Daniel Green	Elizabeth May	5 December 2014	4 November 2019
Jo-Ann Roberts	Elizabeth May	19 March 2018	4 November 2019
Angela Davidson	Amita Kuttner	2021	21 June 2022
Luc Joli-Coeur	Amita Kuttner	21 June 2022	19 November 2022
Jonathan Pedneault	Elizabeth May	19 November 2022	9 July 2024
Angela Davidson	Elizabeth May	8 February 2024	present
Mike Morrice	Elizabeth May	28 November 2025	5 August 2026

=== Party parliamentary leaders ===
The position of parliamentary leader was created on 4 November 2019, when then-leader Elizabeth May announced that she was resigning as leader of the party, but would remain leader of the parliamentary caucus. The position ceased to exist after May re-assumed the party leadership in 2022. In 2026, she again became parliamentary leader, as the Green Party's sole MP, as leader Mike Morrice does not have a seat in parliament.

- Elizabeth May (2019–2022, 2026—present)

== Election results ==
=== House of Commons ===
Source: History of Federal elections since 1867

Election	Leader	Votes	%	Seats	+/–	Position	Status
1984	Trevor Hancock	26,921	0.21	0 / 282	Steady	7th	No seats
1988	Seymour Trieger	47,228	0.36	0 / 295	Steady	7th	No seats
1993	Chris Lea	32,979	0.24	0 / 295	Steady	▼10th	No seats
1997	Joan Russow	55,583	0.43	0 / 301	Steady	▲6th	No seats
2000	Joan Russow	104,402	0.81	0 / 301	Steady	6th	No seats
2004	Jim Harris	582,247	4.32	0 / 308	Steady	▲5th	No seats
2006	Jim Harris	665,940	4.48	0 / 308	Steady	5th	No seats
2008	Elizabeth May	941,097	6.78	0 / 308	Steady	5th	No seats
2011	Elizabeth May	576,221	3.91	1 / 308	▲1	5th	No status
2015	Elizabeth May	605,637	3.45	1 / 338	Steady	5th	No status
2019	Elizabeth May	1,189,607	6.55	3 / 338	▲2	5th	No status
2021	Annamie Paul	397,014	2.33	2 / 338	▼1	5th	No status
2025	Elizabeth May & Jonathan Pedneault	238,892	1.22	1 / 343	▼1	5th	No status

View source data.

== Provincial and territorial parties ==
Nine provinces have an active Green party. While these parties and the Green Party of Canada share values and often supporters, they operate as independent entities and do not have common membership.

Nine Green legislators sit in provincial legislative assemblies, including four in Prince Edward Island, two in British Columbia, two in New Brunswick, and two in Ontario. The Greens in Prince Edward Island were the first Green party to form the official opposition in any provincial assembly.

The only province without a Green party is Newfoundland and Labrador. An association called the Terra Nova Greens, created in 1996, was previously the Green Party of Canada's "official unit" for the province. TNG was never a registered party, but fielded independent candidates in three provincial general elections. They remained the federal party's "official unit" until 2007, but most supporters cut ties to the national party in 2006 (or earlier) over its opposition to the traditional Newfoundland seal hunt. As of 2021, there are ongoing efforts to establish a provincial green party in Newfoundland and Labrador.

The Yukon Green Party was active from 2011 to 2021.

Nunavut and the Northwest Territories have legislatures that use non-partisan consensus government. As such, there are no registered green parties (or any other parties) in these territories. However, one member of the Northwest Territories Legislative Assembly was known to be a member of the federal Green Party: Rylund Johnson of Yellowknife North.

== See also ==
- Green Party of Canada leadership elections
