= Leon S. Robertson =

Epidemiologist (born 1936)

Leon S. Robertson (born 1936) is a retired injury epidemiologist.

From 1978 to 1998, Robertson occupied various positions in the Institution for Social and Policy Studies and the Department of Epidemiology and Public Health at Yale University. He previously served on the faculties of Harvard University Medical School (1966–70) and Wake Forest University (1962–65). He was also Senior Behavioral Scientist in the Insurance Institute for Highway Safety (1970–78).

Robertson contributed 11 books and 150 articles and chapters to scientific literature. In retirement he wrote 4 nonfiction books and a novel, The HOA Murders. He was a member of the National Research Council/Institute of Medicine Committee on Trauma Research that produced the report Injury in America: A Continuing Public Health Problem and was vice-chair of the NRC committee that reviewed the injury control program of the Centers for Disease Control. He also served on the National Research Council Panel on Occupational Safety and Health Statistics and chaired the special interest group on Injury Control and Emergency Health Services of the American Public Health Association.

== Selected bibliography ==
- Injuries: Causes, Control, Strategies and Public Policy (D.C. Heath, 1983)
- Tesh, Sylvia Noble, Carolyn Tuohy, Tom Christoffel, Trevor Hancock, Judy Norsigian, Elena Nightingale, and Leon Robertson. "The meaning of healthy public policy." Health Promotion International 2, no. 3 (1987): 257–262. volume 2, issue 3 (1987). 1987. DOI: 10.1093/heapro/2.3.257.
- Injury Epidemiology (Oxford University Press, 1992)
- Injury Epidemiology Research and Control Strategies (Oxford University Press, 1998)
- Injury Epidemiology: Third Edition (Oxford University Press, 2007)
- Injury Epidemiology: Fourth Edition (Free online at www.nanlee.net, 2015)
- The Expert Witness Scam (Mightywords.com, 2000; www.lulu.com, 2006)
- Hillbilly to Harvard to Yale (www.lulu.com, 2006)
- The HOA Murders: A Novel of Suspense (www.lulu.com, 2011)
- Stock Market Science vs. Myth: How to Test Before You Invest (www.lulu.com, 2014)
- Make America Great Again: Myths, Lies, and Facts (www.lulu.com, 2019) Free online at: www.nanlee.net
- Roads to COVID-19 Containment and Spread (Austin Macauley, 2023)
- Dysfunctional: Scientists, Fundamentalists, and Politicians (Amazon, 2024)

== Awards ==
The American Public Health Association' injury prevention section gave Robertson the Distinguished Career Award. Robertson was also honored by Johns Hopkins University and the University of Minnesota, who named professorships in his name.
