= Young Greens of Canada =

Youth wing of the Green Party

- Jeunes Verts du Canada
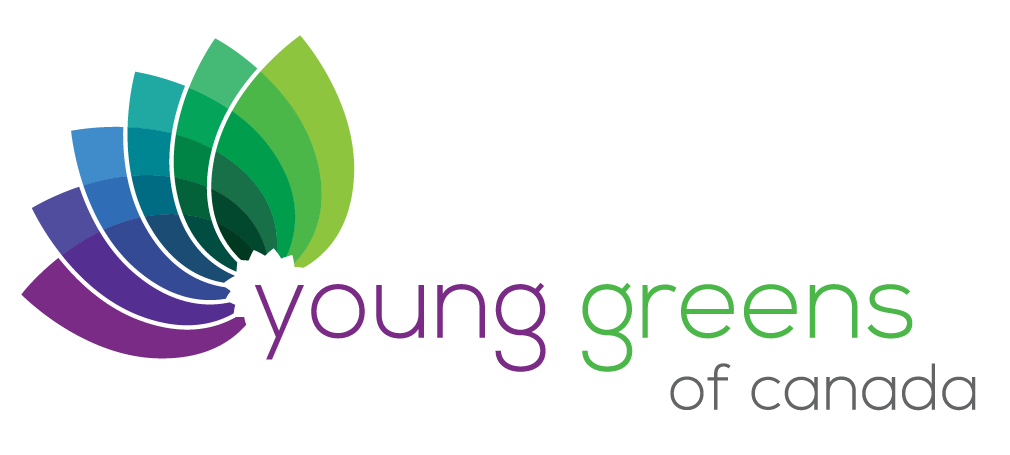
- Abbreviation: YGC / JVC
- Legal status: Active
- Location: Canada
- Official language: English, French
- Co-Chairs: Pearson Singbeil Montgomery; Vacant
- Parent organization: Green Party of Canada
- Affiliations: Global Young Greens
- Website: greenparty.ca

The Young Greens of Canada are the youth wing of the Green Party of Canada and were formed at the 2006 leadership convention. The Young Greens of Canada's membership consists of youth aged 14 to 29 years of age. All Green Party of Canada members in good standing, between the ages of 14 and 29, are eligible to vote on Young Greens Council elections every year. The Young Greens have campus clubs and regional clubs established across Canada. The wing works with Green Party leader Mike Morrice.

== History ==
The Young Greens of Canada were formed at the 2006 national convention in Ottawa. A constitutional resolution moving that two Youth Co-Chairs seat be created on Federal Council (Section 7.3.13), and the second, a directive resolution moving that a standing committee on youth involvement in the party be created.

The standing committee on youth involvement had their first meeting in a packed corner of an Elephant and Castle pub and restaurant. During this meeting, it was decided that a Youth Caucus Development Committee (YCDC) would best meet the need of developing an appropriate Constitution, job descriptions for Council positions, and means of electing the members of a Young Greens Council.

The first Young Greens Council elections were held for 2007. The Young Greens Council announced a binding constitutional referendum to amend their constitution for the first time on November 26, 2008. Young Greens voted on this constitutional reform online between December 27 and 29, 2008. In the case of a constitutional referendum, approval must be made by 66% of voters for amendments to come into effect.

== Principles ==
=== Principles ===
The Young Greens of Canada follows the Green Party of Canada and Global Greens' six key principles, which were adopted at the 2002 convention of the Global Greens. These principles are:

- ecological wisdom
- non-violence
- social justice
- sustainability
- participatory democracy
- respect for diversity

== Young Greens Executive Council ==
The Young Greens of Canada Council is the governing body of the Young Greens of Canada. Councilors have two-year terms and represent Green Party of Canada members who are under 30. The Young Greens Council also has two representatives on the Green Party of Canada's Federal Council. The Young Greens Council make strategic decisions regarding youth engagement and outreach.

=== Current Council ===
Source as of June 14, 2025

- Co-Chairs: Pearson Singbeil Montgomery & Vacant
- Advocacy Coordinator: Lily Yangliu
- Engagement Coordinator: Gurshan Singh Marahrh
- Finance Coordinator: Lien Huyhn
- Atlantic Representative: Vacant
- British Columbia Representative: Vacant
- Northern Representative: Vacant
- Ontario Representative: Lilian Barraclough
- Prairies Representative: Vacant
- Quebec Representative: Vacant
- YG-Advisors (non-voting members): Kiara Nazon & Stuart Hunter

=== Council 2024 ===
- Chair and Youth Representatives on the Green Party of Canada's Federal Council: Stuart Hunter
- Alberta Representative: Ogkayan Brillantes
- British Columbia Representative: Anoop Hans
- Manitoba Representative: Pearson Singbeil Montgomery
- New Brunswick Representative: Shaina Kennedy
- Newfoundland and Labrador Representative: Vacant
- Nova Scotia Representative: Danielle Burns
- Ontario Representative: Muskaan Sharma
- Prince Edward Island Representative: Ava Grace King
- Quebec Representative: Azélie Pouliot
- Saskatchewan Representative: Vacant

=== Council 2018–2019 ===
- Co-Chairs and Youth Representatives on the Green Party of Canada's Federal Council: Avery Velez & Stuart Hunter
- Alberta Representative: Max Stronge
- British Columbia Representative: Joel Woznow
- Manitoba Representative: Bryanne Lamoureux
- New Brunswick Representative: Delaney Crawford
- Newfoundland and Labrador Representative: Alexandra Hayward
- Nova Scotia Representative: Karyn MacPherson
- Ontario Representative: Jeremy Leite
- Quebec Representative: Grace Tarabey
- Prince Edward Island Representative: Jonathan Williams
- Sskatchewan Representative: Tracey Moody

== Campus & Regional Clubs ==
=== Campus Clubs ===
- University of Victoria
- University of Ottawa
- Concordia University
- Simon Fraser University
- Nipissing University
- University of Guelph
- University of New Brunswick-Fredericton
- University of the Fraser Valley
- University of Toronto
- McGill University
- University of Montreal
- University of Winnipeg
