= Media Report to Women =

- Discipline: Women and the media
- Language: English
- Edited by: Sheila Gibbons

Publication details
- History: 1972-present
- Publisher: Communication Research Associates, Inc. (United States)
- Frequency: Quarterly

Standard abbreviations
- ISO 4: Media Rep. Women

Indexing
- ISSN: 0145-9651
- LCCN: 80640489
- OCLC no.: 560547183

Links
- Journal homepage; Online access; Online archive

Media Report to Women is an academic journal, published quarterly, which provides information on all types of media and the way they depict women and issues of interest to women. It also challenges the ways that women and girls are underrepresented overall, and their depiction "as victims or in outdated, stereotypical roles". The journal is published by Communication Research Associates, Inc., and its editor is Sheila Gibbons (vice president, Communication Research Associates, Inc.)

== Abstracting and indexing ==
- ProQuest
- EBSCO
