= Upper River Valley Hospital =

- Horizon Health Network
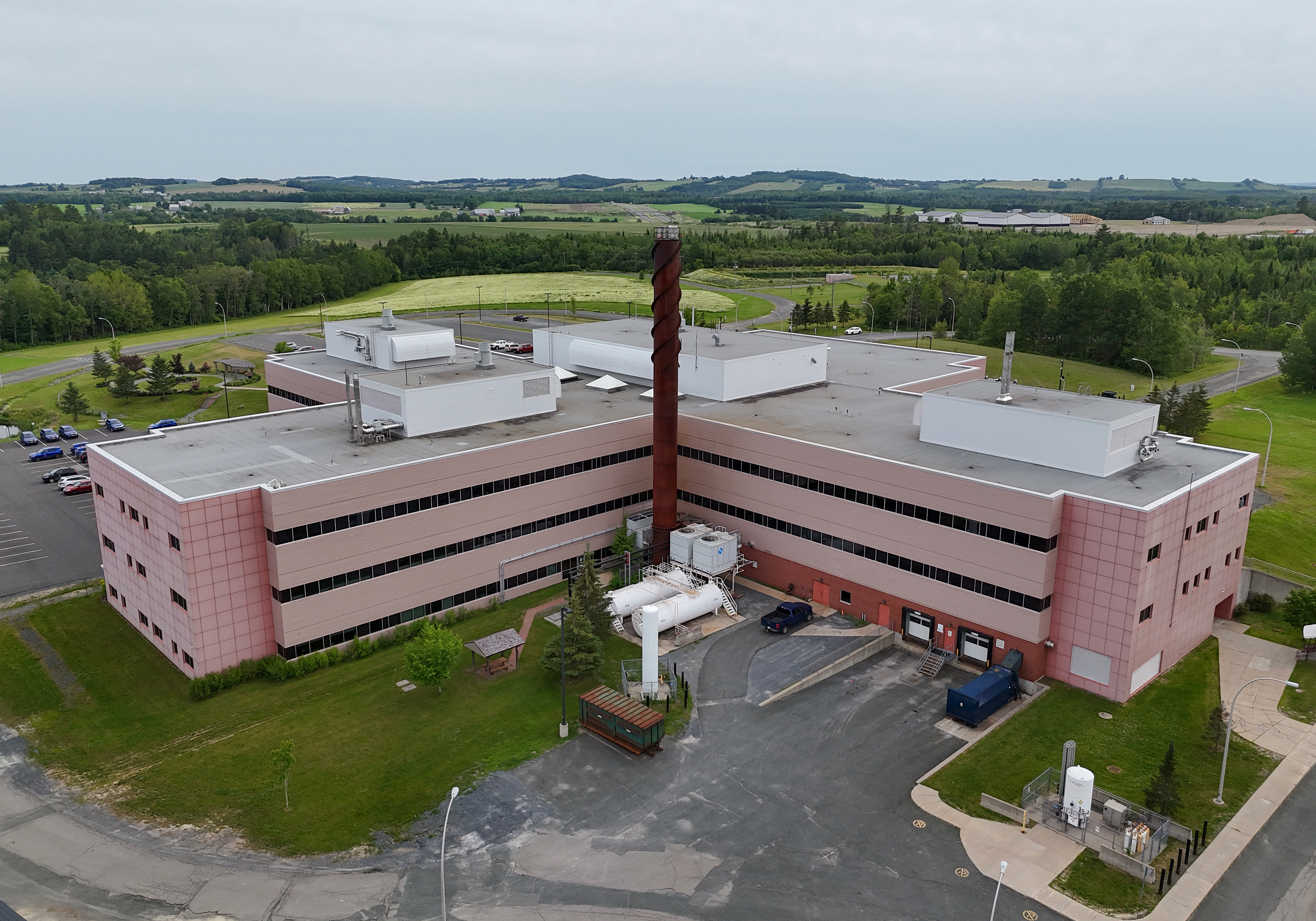

- Location in New Brunswick

Geography
- Location: 11300 Route 130, Waterville, New Brunswick, Canada
- Coordinates: 46.2836°N 67.5711°W

Organization
- Type: Acute care

Services
- Beds: 70

History
- Founded: 2007

Links
- Website: Upper River Valley Hospital
- Lists: Hospitals in Canada

Upper River Valley Hospital (French: Hôpital du Haut de la Vallée) is a Canadian hospital located in Waterville, New Brunswick.

Operated by Horizon Health Network, the Upper River Valley Hospital opened November 18, 2007, replacing the Carleton Memorial Hospital in Woodstock, NB and the Northern Carleton Hospital in Bath, NB.

The hospital's location was influenced by the nearby construction of a new 4-lane expressway alignment for Route 2. Many residents of Carleton County were upset with the closing of their old hospitals and the relocation of health care services to Waterville.

== Services ==
- Addictions and Mental Health
- Clinical Services
  - Day Surgery
  - Dialysis (Nephrology)
  - Emergency Department
  - Family Medicine
  - Gastroenterology
  - General Surgery
  - Geriatrics / Restorative Care
  - Intensive Care Unit (ICU)
  - Internal Medicine
  - Minor Surgery
  - Pediatrics
  - Palliative Care
  - Obstetrics
  - Oncology
  - Ophthalmology (Eye) Surgery
  - Rehabilitation
  - Urology Surgery
- Support and Therapy
- Diagnostics and Testing
- Clinics
- Extra Mural Programs
- Public Health Programs
- Other Services
