= 2025 Green Party of Canada co-leadership election =

- February 4, 2025
- Turnout: 29% (▼7.0 pp)
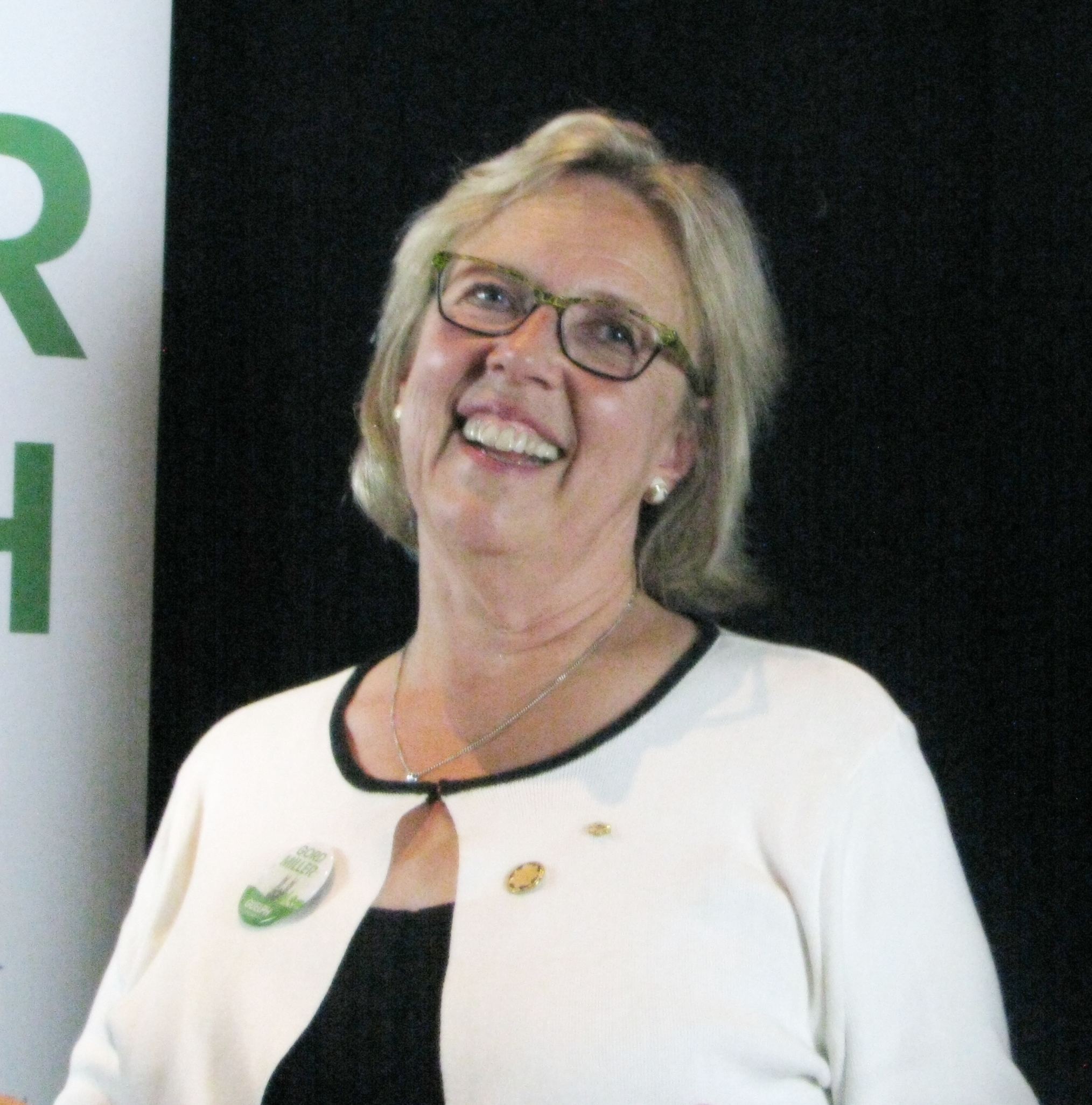

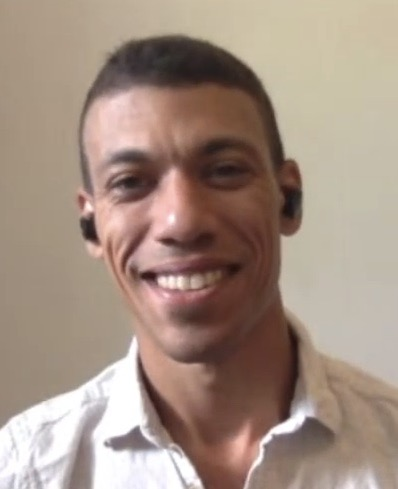

Candidate	Elizabeth May & Jonathan Pedneault	Abstention
Votes	2,674	316
Percentage	89.4	10.6
Leader before election
Elizabeth May (sole)
Elected Co-Leaders
Elizabeth May & Jonathan Pedneault

2025 Green Party leadership election
- Date: February 4, 2025
- Convention: 116 Albert Street; Suite 812; Ottawa, Ontario
- Won by: Elizabeth May & Jonathan Pedneault
- Ballots: 1
- Candidates: 1 (joint ticket) (+ abstention)

The Green Party of Canada held a co-leadership ratification election on February 4, 2025.

== Background ==
On November 19, 2022, Elizabeth May was elected leader of the party once again, promising to convert the current leadership model into a co-leadership model, with Jonathan Pedneault being her co-leader. Notably, four of the six candidates approved to run in the 2022 leadership race campaigned as part of joint tickets, promising to appoint the losing member of their ticket as a deputy or co-leader. As co-leadership was not recognized in the Green Party’s constitution at the time of the leadership election, a move to shared leadership required approval from the Green Party. Former party leader Elizabeth May campaigned with Jonathan Pedneault; he became Deputy Leader while the two sought to amend the party constitution.

In February 2024, party members were to vote on motions which, if passed, would have amended the party's constitution to implement a co-leadership model. However, Pedneault was unsuccessful in his attempt to win a seat in the House of Commons through a by-election and the proposed constitutional amendment was not voted upon due to disagreement within the party. On July 9, 2024, Jonathan Pedneault resigned as deputy leader, citing personal reasons. He returned in January 2025 to serve as co-leader, pending election by party membership, which was approved on February 4, 2025, in a landslide. However, while the vote was approved by 89.4% of the 2,990 Green Party of Canada members who voted, 71% of the total 10,301 Green Party of Canada members who were eligible to cast a ballot did not vote.

== Rules ==
To be eligible, a candidate:

- must complete a leadership contest application;
- must have been a member in good standing for at least three months at the end of the application period, unless their employment prohibited them from membership in a political party;
- must be eligible for election to the House of Commons; have no debt owed to the party;
- have no open litigation against the party;
- must be solvent;
- must not have participated in the writing of the campaign rules;
- must be "confirmed to be proficient in speaking and understanding speech in both official languages, such that they can carry out their duties in both languages", unless an Indigenous applicant;
- must have "not demonstrated a pattern, or committed a single egregious act, within reasonable recency, of evidenced and documented violations of the GPC members’ code of conduct, such as inciting or committing violence, racism or abuse";
- has not engaged in a pattern of public advocacy of "positions contrary to the Global Green Principles".

All Party members age 14 and older were eligible to vote.

== Results ==
2025 Green Party of Canada co-leadership election results
Candidate	Votes	Percentage
Elizabeth May and Jonathan Pedneault	2,674	89.4%
Abstention	316	10.6%
Total	2,990	100%

== See also ==
- Green Party of Canada leadership elections
- 2025 Liberal Party of Canada leadership election
