= Northern Digital =

Canadian medical measurement company

Northern Digital Incorporated (NDI) is a Canadian medical measurement company based in Waterloo, Ontario. The company was founded by Jerry Krist in 1981 at the University of Waterloo. They have offices in Hong Kong and Germany.

Northern Digital was acquired by Roper Industries in 2011.

In 2012, Northern Digital acquired Ascension Technology, a provider of 3D tracking technology. The deal was approved by NDI's parent company, Roper Industries.

== Product lineup ==
NDI's Product lineup includes: Optical Measurement Systems including the Polaris (Flagship Model) the Optotrak and the Certus HD; Electromagnetic Tracking Systems such as the Aurora and Wave; Laser Trackers (ScanTRAK); and Reflective Marker Spheres which are authorized 'Brainlab' partner utilities.

== Medical sector ==
NDI's primary products are optical measurement systems used in surgery and other medical procedures. The company's primary optical tracking tool, the 'Polaris', is used in many medical procedures including Brain Surgery, Neurosurgery, PET Procedures, Ear Nose & Throat Surgery, Medical Robotics Integration, Spinal Surgery, Computer Assisted Therapy and I.G.R.T. (Image-Guided Radiation Therapy). The company's Wave Speech Research system is able to track minute movements in a child's mouth with the goal of developing better speech therapy protocols, particularly for children whose pathology involves spasticity, such as in cerebral palsy patients.

== Ascension Technology ==
In 2012, Northern Digital acquired Ascension Technology, a provider of 3D tracking technology.

Ascension Technology was co-founded by Jack Scully and Ernie Blood in 1986. The company was based in Colchester, Vermont. Jack Scully and Ernie Blood had previously created the digitizer used in the Star Wars series. One of Ascension's products was the Flock of Birds 3D tracking system.

The Flock of Birds system uses DC magnetic tracking.

In 1997, the price tag for one of the models of Ascension's wearable motion capture systems was over $30,000.

One of Ascension's tracking systems was the LaserBIRD optical tracker, which was used as the 3D tracking in the U.S. Army's Virtual Cockpit Optimization Program (VCOP) for helicopter pilots.

== Industrial sector ==
NDI has many tracking products designed for industries.
