= Notre-Dame-de-Grâce (disambiguation) =

Notre-Dame-de-Grâce is a residential neighbourhood of Montreal, Quebec, Canada.

Notre-Dame-de-Grâce may also refer to:

- Notre-Dame-de-Grâce (federal electoral district)
- Notre-Dame-de-Grâce (provincial electoral district)
- Notre-Dame-de-Grâce—Westmount
- Notre-Dame-de-Grâce—Lachine
- 2023 Notre-Dame-de-Grâce—Westmount federal by-election
