= Jonathan Pedneault =

Canadian politician (born 1990)

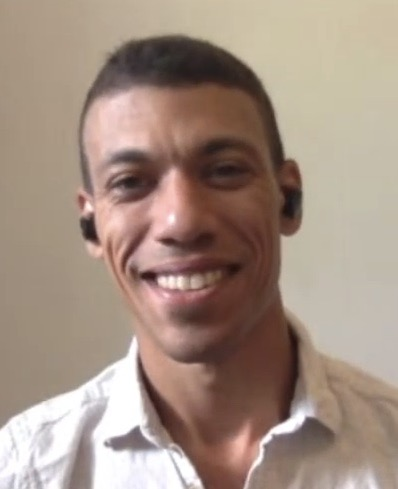
- Pedneault in 2022

Co-leader of the Green Party
- In office February 4, 2025 – April 30, 2025 Serving with Elizabeth May
- Deputy: Angela Davidson
- Preceded by: Elizabeth May (as leader)
- Succeeded by: Elizabeth May (as leader)

Deputy leader of the Green Party
- In office November 19, 2022 – July 9, 2024 Serving with Angela Davidson (February 8, 2024 – July 9, 2024)
- Leader: Elizabeth May
- Preceded by: Angela Davidson and Luc Joli-Coeur
- Succeeded by: Angela Davidson

Personal details
- Born: 19 April 1990 (age 36) Montreal, Quebec, Canada
- Party: Green (since 2022)
- Other political affiliations: Liberal (2009)
- Education: University of Ottawa
- Occupation: Politician; activist; journalist

Jonathan Pedneault (/ˈpɛdnoʊ/ PED-noh, French: [pɛdno]; born 19 April 1990) is a Canadian politician, activist, and journalist who served as the co-leader of the Green Party of Canada in 2025, alongside Elizabeth May. He had previously served as the party's deputy leader from 2022 to 2024. He is the first Québécois to serve as leader of the Greens.

== Early life and education ==
Pedneault was born an only child of a single mother in Greenfield Park, on the south shore of Montreal.

When he was 15, Pedneault co-founded Soprégé, or Société de Prévention du Génocide, a student organization dedicated to raising awareness about the Holocaust, the Rwandan genocide and the crisis in Darfur. In 2006, Pedneault submitted the draft of a bill on the Canadian Responsibility for the Prevention of Genocide to his local MP, Caroline St-Hilaire.

That year, Pedneault received a national scholarship from the Millennium Scholarship Program and was named Personnalité de la Semaine by Québec newspaper La Presse and Radio-Canada. Following his graduation from Jacques-Rousseau high school in Longueuil, Pedneault enrolled as a political science student at the University of Ottawa, beginning his undergraduate classes in the fall of 2007.

== Journalism career ==
In 2008, shortly before his 18th birthday, Pedneault travelled to Chad and crossed into Sudan’s Darfur with rebels from the Justice and Equality movement to report on the humanitarian crisis and co-produce a CBC/Radio-Canada documentary.

Between 2010 and 2012, Pedneault codirected The New Great Game, a 52-minute documentary produced for CBC/Radio-Canada, Al-Jazeera and Arte about the multipolarization of the Middle East's maritime spaces. Pedneault directed filming and reporting in the region, securing access to both Somali pirates in Galmudug’s town of Hobyo and to NATO anti-piracy naval forces patrolling the Indian Ocean.

=== 2011 Egypt attack ===
Pedneault was attacked by a large mob when deployed to cover the 2011 Egyptian Revolution for L’Actualité. Injured on the head as he tried to help American journalist Greg Palkot, he was hospitalized and later detained by the Egyptian military alongside Fox News journalists. In an interview with GQ, Palkot said: “[A] Canadian guy—he's a young guy, a 20-year-old journalist, actually—had made it to that APC okay, and he actually had gotten on top of it. And he saw me, my face full of blood, my body full of blood, getting pummeled, and he tried to pull me up over the side of the APC. And for his help he got rifle-butted off of the thing and had to find his way to safety, and luckily he did.”

Pedneault returned to the region later that year to cover the western and eastern fronts of the Libyan civil war. He travelled with James Foley and John Lee Anderson to Tripoli a few days after rebel forces took the capital from Muammar Gaddafi. Foley and Pedneault shared a hotel room in Tripoli with Matthew Van Dyke and a fourth journalist, sharing rides and reporting together as rebels continued to fight pockets of Gaddafi sympathizers in the city.

=== Training local journalists ===
In 2013, Pedneault trained South Sudanese journalists reporting with Radio Tamazuj in both Juba and Malakal. The following year, Pedneault began training journalists with the Réseau des Journalistes pour les Droits de l’Homme during the Central African Republic Civil War, then engulfed in deadly intercommunal violence. That year, Camille Lepage, a close friend of Pedneault, was assassinated. Pedneault brought her body back to her family.

=== Human rights investigations ===
Between 2017 and 2022, Pedneault worked as a researcher with the emergencies team at Human Rights Watch. As part of that division, he worked under the radar of the authorities in Venezuela, Nicaragua and Belarus to document torture and excessive use of force by security forces following elections and protests. He also conducted research in conflict affected areas of Cameroon to produce the organization’s first report on the abuses committed by government and opposition forces in the context of the Anglophone crisis. Pedneault’s last investigative work with Human Rights Watch took place in Ukraine during the first ten days of the 2022 conflict.

== Political career ==
In 2009, Pedneault left the University of Ottawa to seek the Liberal Party of Canada’s nomination in his home district of Longueuil-Pierre-Boucher. Denis Coderre, the party’s lieutenant in Quebec, blocked his bid and appointed a candidate, despite then leader Michael Ignatieff’s assurances the party would hold open nominations in all ridings not represented by a sitting MP. The nomination would go to Kévan Falsafi, who would place third in the federal election. Pedneault was later offered the Liberal nomination in Verchères—Les Patriotes, but he declined. The nomination would be won by Pier-Luc Therrien-Péloquin, who also placed in third. This prompted Pedneault to co-author an op-ed in La Presse calling on Ignatieff to uphold his promise to democratize the party.

On July 16, 2022, Pedneault entered the Green Party of Canada's 2022 leadership race, running with former leader Elizabeth May on a shared platform. They supported moving the Green Party to a co-leadership model. After May won the election, Pedneault was announced as deputy leader of the party. As co-leadership is not formally recognized in the party’s constitution, Pedneault served as May's deputy leader while the two sought to amend the party constitution.

Pedneault was nominated as the Green Party candidate in the 2023 Notre-Dame-de-Grâce—Westmount federal by-election. In the by-election, Pedneault finished fourth with 13.45% of the vote, with Liberal Anna Gainey elected to succeed Marc Garneau. The result was the highest Green Party vote share percentage in the riding's history.

The proposed constitutional change was not approved due to internal disagreement and on July 9, 2024, Jonathan Pedneault resigned as deputy leader, citing personal reasons. He returned in January 2025 to serve as co-leader, pending approval from party membership. Pedneault's appointment as Co-Leader, which did not involve a competitive election, was approved on February 4, 2025. In March 2025, he confirmed that he would run in Outremont and represent the party in leaders' debates. However, on the morning of the French debate, Pedneault's invitation to the leaders' debates was rescinded as the Green Party did not meet the criteria to qualify for the debates. Pedneault criticized the decision as "undemocratic".

In the 2025 federal election, Pedneault lost the election in Outremont to incumbent Liberal MP and Cabinet Minister, Rachel Bendayan. He resigned as co-leader shortly after the election, taking responsibility for the party's electoral performance, which only saw May elected.

== Electoral history ==
2025 Canadian federal election: Outremont
Party	Candidate	Votes	%	±%	Expenditures
Liberal	Rachel Bendayan	26,024	55.20	+10.84	$98,796.10
Conservative	Ronan Reich	5,911	12.54	+5.23	$24,711.42
Bloc Québécois	Rémi Lebeuf	5,644	11.97	−3.47	$3,085.53
New Democratic	Ève Péclet	5,024	10.66	−16.64	$29,001.06
Green	Jonathan Pedneault	4,539	9.63	+6.51	$76,595.41
Total valid votes		47,142	98.73	–0.08	$125,931.56
Total rejected ballots		606	1.27	+0.08	
Turnout		47,748	62.34	+5.46	
Eligible voters		76,592			
Liberal notional hold		Swing		+2.81	
Source: Elections Canada

Canadian federal by-election, June 19, 2023: Notre-Dame-de-Grâce—Westmount Resignation of Marc Garneau
Party	Candidate	Votes	%	±%
Liberal	Anna Gainey	11,051	50.87	−2.90
New Democratic	Jean-François Filion	3,001	13.81	−5.39
Conservative	Mathew Kaminski	2,936	13.51	−0.55
Green	Jonathan Pedneault	2,922	13.45	+9.42
Bloc Québécois	Laurence Massey	985	4.53	−0.75
Centrist	Alex Trainman Montagano	510	2.35	
People's	Tiny Olinga	141	0.65	−2.64
Rhinoceros	Sean Carson	97	0.45	
Christian Heritage	Yves Gilbert	65	0.30	+0.17
No Affiliation (Note: Ardea is a member of the Communist League, an unregistered party; "No Affiliation" is EC's term for leaving the party affiliation blank on a candidate's registration form.)	Félix Vincent Ardea	18	0.08	
Total valid votes		21,726	99.25	
Total rejected ballots		165	0.75	−0.22
Turnout			29.93	−32.63
Eligible voters		73,152		
Liberal hold		Swing		+1.25
Source: Elections Canada

== See also ==
- List of Green party leaders in Canada
