= Michael Bloomfield =

Michael Bloomfield may refer to:

- Michael J. Bloomfield (born 1959), American astronaut
- Mike Bloomfield (1943–1981), American guitarist
