= Michael Pitfield =

Canadian politician and civil servant

The Honourable P. Michael Pitfield PC OC CVO

Canadian Senator from Ontario
- In office December 22, 1982 – June 1, 2010
- Appointed by: Pierre Trudeau

Personal details
- Born: Peter Michael Pitfield; June 18, 1937 Montreal, Quebec, Canada
- Died: October 19, 2017 (aged 80) Montreal, Quebec, Canada
- Party: Independent
- Spouse: Nancy Elizabeth Snow
- Children: 3, including Tom

Peter Michael Pitfield PC OC CVO (June 18, 1937 – October 19, 2017) was a Canadian Senator and senior civil servant.

== Background ==
Born in Montreal, Quebec, Pitfield graduated from St. Lawrence University in Canton, New York, at the age of 16. His SLU degree, in science, was followed by a degree in law from McGill University.

Pitfield was the youngest son of the Canadian financier Ward C. Pitfield and Grace MacDougall Pitfield, daughter of Canadian ice hockey player Hartland MacDougall. His brother, Ward C. Pitfield Jr., was Chairman of the family Investment Banking firm, Pitfield, MacKay, Ross, which later merged with Dominion Securities, now the investment arm of the Royal Bank of Canada. Another brother, stockbroker Robert Hartland Pitfield (d. 2004), was father-in-law of former Toronto city councillor Jane Pitfield. His nephew, Ward Elcock is the former director of the Canadian Security Intelligence Service and former Deputy Minister at the Department of National Defence (Canada).

He went to Ottawa to join the civil service in 1959 where he worked as an administrative assistant to Justice Minister E. Davie Fulton.

Pitfield subsequently obtained a postgraduate degree in public law, and held various positions in the civil service. In 1966, he became assistant secretary to the Privy council and in 1969 secretary of the Division of planification. He became Clerk of the Privy Council of Canada and Secretary to the Cabinet under Prime Minister Pierre Trudeau from 1975 to 1979, and again from 1980 to 1982. Because of his perceived close association with Trudeau and the Liberals, he was replaced during the ministry of Joe Clark, but returned following the 1980 election that returned Trudeau to power.

The diplomat John G. H. Halstead described Pitfield as an "evil influence" on the Trudeau government, describing him as a schemer who was always seeking to promote his own interests at the expense of others by preventing other officials from having access to Trudeau. Halstead accused Pitfield as having thrown Canadian foreign policy into chaos by creating a gratuitously convoluted bureaucratic structure that caused much bureaucratic in-fighting as a way to enhance his power.

As head of the public service, Pitfield played a senior role in the government's successful efforts to patriate the Canadian Constitution. In recognition of his service, he was appointed to the Canadian Senate as an independent at Trudeau's recommendation on December 22, 1982. The appointment was controversial and seen as emblematic of the growing financial, partisan and cultural issues surrounding the Ottawa civil service.

Pitfield served from the mid-1980s until 2002 as vice chairman of Power Corporation, and then was Director Emeritus of the company.

Pitfield's two decades of service to the University of Ottawa Heart Institute Foundation were recognized by the establishment of the Michael Pitfield Chair in Cardiac Surgery at the Institute. In later years, he developed Parkinson's disease and worked to raise awareness of the condition.

Pitfield resigned from the Senate on June 1, 2010.

He fathered three children (Caroline, Thomas and Kate) before his death on October 18, 2017, and was predeceased by his wife Nancy in 1999. He lived in Westmount, Quebec, for many years. His son Tom Pitfield is also a Senator, and his daughter-in-law Anna Gainey is now a Member of Parliament.

== Publications ==
- Bothwell, Robert; Granatstein, Jack (2017). Trudeau's World: Insiders Reflect on Foreign Policy, Trade, and Defence, 1968-84. Vancouver: University of British Columbia Press. ISBN 978-0774836401.
