= Tom Pitfield =

Canadian politician and political advisor

The Honourable Tom Pitfield
- Official Senate portrait, 2026

Canadian Senator from Quebec (De la Durantaye)
- Incumbent
- Assumed office September 18, 2026
- Nominated by: Mark Carney
- Appointed by: Louise Arbour
- Preceded by: Judith Seidman

38th Principal Secretary to the Prime Minister of Canada
- In office March 14, 2025 – July 7, 2026 Serving with David Lametti (July–September 2025)
- Prime Minister: Mark Carney
- Preceded by: Gerald Butts (2019)
- Succeeded by: Scott Gilmore

Personal details
- Party: Liberal
- Spouse: Anna Gainey
- Parent: Michael Pitfield (father)

Thomas Pitfield is a Canadian politician, executive, and political advisor who has been a Canadian senator from Quebec since 2026. He served as the Principal Secretary to the Prime Minister of Canada from 2025 to 2026.

== Career ==
Pitfield attended Selwyn House School and has a bachelor of commerce from Queen’s University and master’s degree in political philosophy from the London School of Economics. He is a longtime strategist for the Liberal Party of Canada. He is the founder of Data Sciences, a Canadian analytics firm, and previously worked for IBM Canada. He also co-founded policy think tank Canada 2020. A close advisor to prime minister Mark Carney, he served as his principal secretary from 2025 to 2026, briefly alongside David Lametti. In July 2026, Carney announced that Pitfield would be appointed to the Senate of Canada.

== Personal life ==
Pitfield is married to Liberal MP Anna Gainey. He is the son of former clerk of the Privy Council and senator Michael Pitfield.
