= Anna Gainey =

Canadian politician (born 1978)

The Honourable Anna Gainey PC MP

Secretary of State (Children and Youth)
- Incumbent
- Assumed office May 13, 2025
- Prime Minister: Mark Carney
- Preceded by: Position established

Member of Parliament for Notre-Dame-de-Grâce—Westmount
- Incumbent
- Assumed office June 19, 2023
- Preceded by: Marc Garneau

President of the Liberal Party of Canada
- In office February 22, 2014 – April 21, 2018
- Leader: Justin Trudeau
- Preceded by: Mike Crawley
- Succeeded by: Suzanne Cowan

Personal details
- Born: December 13, 1978 (age 47) Montreal, Quebec, Canada
- Party: Liberal
- Spouse: Tom Pitfield
- Parent: Bob Gainey (father)
- Education: McGill University (BA); London School of Economics (MSc)

Anna M. Gainey (born December 13, 1978) is a Canadian politician who was elected to the Canadian House of Commons in a by-election on June 19, 2023. She has served as Secretary of State for Children and Youth since 2025. Gainey represents Notre-Dame-de-Grâce—Westmount as a member of the Liberal Party of Canada. She had previously served as the party's president between 2014 and 2018, during and following its electoral success in the 2015 Canadian federal election.

Gainey is the daughter of former Montreal Canadiens player and general manager Bob Gainey. She is married to Tom Pitfield, son of former clerk of the Privy Council and senator Michael Pitfield.

== Early life and career ==
As the daughter of Hockey Hall of Fame winger Bob Gainey, Gainey was raised in the municipality of Westmount in Montreal, Canada. She therefore grew up as a bilingual Anglophone Quebecer. Her sister Laura was swept overboard from a sailing ship during a gale near Cape Cod in 2006.

Gainey studied Political Science at McGill University, before completing a Master's Degree in International Relations at the London School of Economics.

== Federal politics ==
Following graduation, Gainey worked as a policy advisor to the Ministers of National Defence and Veterans Affairs, Bill Graham and John McCallum. During this time, she became a close friend of future Canadian Prime Minister and fellow Montrealer Justin Trudeau, actively advising on his campaign to become leader of the Liberal Party of Canada. Shortly after Trudeau's success, Gainey announced her intention to run for president of the party.

Gainey became president of the Liberal Party at the age of 36 in February 2014, succeeding businessman Mike Crawley. She won re-election in 2016, before stepping down from the position in April 2018, at the end of her second term.

Following a break from federal politics, Gainey was briefly Chief Executive of the Policy think-tank Canada 2020, the advisory board of which was chaired by economist Mark Carney.

In spring 2023, Gainey successfully ran for the Liberal nomination in the federal riding of Notre-Dame-de-Grâce—Westmount, beating vice-president and general counsel of Air Canada, Fred Headon. This was following the resignation of the riding's previous MP, Marc Garneau. In the subsequent by-election, Gainey was elected with 50.87% of the vote.

She was re-elected in the 2025 Canadian federal election.

On May 13, 2025, Gainey was appointed Secretary of State for Children and Youth in the 30th Canadian Ministry by Mark Carney.

At the time of the 2025 Canadian federal election, she lived in Westmount.

=== Electoral record ===
2025 Canadian federal election: Notre-Dame-de-Grâce—Westmount
Party	Candidate	Votes	%	±%	Expenditures
Liberal	Anna Gainey	34,226	63.99	+11.15	$106,815.03
Conservative	Neil Drabkin	10,517	19.66	+6.21	$15,516.78
New Democratic	Malcolm Lewis-Richmond	3,956	7.40	−12.68	$12,780.50
Bloc Québécois	Félix-Antoine Brault	2,652	4.96	–1.02	$3,049.13
Green	Arnold Downey	1,331	2.49	−1.51	$5,956.73
Independent	Alex Trainman Montagano	264	0.49	N/A	$771.08
People's	Marc Perez	256	0.48	−2.77	$0.00
Marxist–Leninist	Rachel Hoffman	162	0.30	+0.04	$0.00
Rhinoceros	Stephen Hensley	126	0.24	N/A	$0.00
Total valid votes		53,490	99.11	+0.11	$126,717.58
Total rejected ballots		482	0.89	–0.11	
Turnout		53,972	67.23	+4.79	
Eligible voters		80,279			
Liberal notional hold		Swing		+2.47	
Source: Elections Canada

Canadian federal by-election, June 19, 2023: Notre-Dame-de-Grâce—Westmount Resignation of Marc Garneau
Party	Candidate	Votes	%	±%
Liberal	Anna Gainey	11,051	50.87	-2.90
New Democratic	Jean-François Filion	3,001	13.81	-5.39
Conservative	Mathew Kaminski	2,936	13.51	-0.55
Green	Jonathan Pedneault	2,922	13.45	+9.42
Bloc Québécois	Laurence Massey	985	4.53	-0.75
Centrist	Alex Trainman Montagano	510	2.35	
People's	Tiny Olinga	141	0.65	-2.64
Rhinoceros	Sean Carson	97	0.45	
Christian Heritage	Yves Gilbert	65	0.30	+0.17
No Affiliation (Note: Ardea is a member of the Communist League, an unregistered party; "No Affiliation" is EC's term for leaving the party affiliation blank on a candidate's registration form.)	Félix Vincent Ardea	18	0.08	
Total valid votes		21,726	99.25	
Total rejected ballots		165	0.75	-0.22
Turnout			29.93	-32.63
Eligible voters		73,152		
Liberal hold		Swing		+1.25
Source: Elections Canada

Order of precedence
Preceded by Stephen Fuhr as Secretary of State	Order of Precedence of Canada as Secretary of State	Succeeded by Wayne Long as Secretary of State
