= 2023 Notre-Dame-de-Grâce—Westmount federal by-election =

Federal by-election in Quebec, Canada

- June 19, 2023

Riding of Notre-Dame-de-Grâce—Westmount
- Turnout: 29.93%
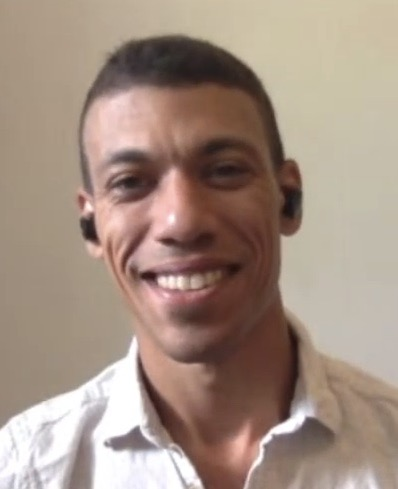
| | First party | Second party |
|---|---|---|
| | LIB | NDP |
| Candidate | Anna Gainey | Jean-François Filion |
| Party | Liberal | New Democratic |
| Popular vote | 11,051 | 3,001 |
| Percentage | 50.87% | 13.81% |
| Swing | ▼2.90% | ▼5.39% |
| | Third party | Fourth party |
| | CPC |
| Candidate | Mathew Kaminski | Jonathan Pedneault |
| Party | Conservative | Green |
| Popular vote | 2,936 | 2,922 |
| Percentage | 13.51% | 13.45% |
| Swing | ▼0.55% | ▲9.42% |
MP before election
Marc Garneau
Liberal
Elected MP
Anna Gainey
Liberal

A by-election was held in the federal riding of Notre-Dame-de-Grâce—Westmount in Quebec on June 19, 2023, following the resignation of Liberal MP Marc Garneau.

The by-election was held on the same day as three others; Oxford, Portage—Lisgar and Winnipeg South Centre.

== Background ==
=== Constituency ===
The electoral district is located on the Island of Montreal and is centred on the namesake neighbourhood of Notre-Dame-de-Grâce and the city of Westmount. South Montreal is considered a heartland for the Liberal Party of Canada, and this riding is no exception. Being a heavily Anglophone riding for Quebec (44% of residents have English as their mother tongue), language issues play a large factor in the district. This part of Montreal has elected Liberals in every election since 1962, except for in 2011 when the Notre-Dame-de-Grâce part of the riding (which was in the riding of Notre-Dame-de-Grâce—Lachine at the time) voted NDP.

=== Representation ===
Notre-Dame-de-Grâce—Westmount was created by the 2012 federal electoral boundaries redistribution and first contested in 2015.

Garneau, previously the Minister of Transport and Minister of Foreign Affairs in the government of Justin Trudeau, had held the seat since 2008.

== Candidates ==
Running for the Liberals is Anna Gainey, former president of the party and daughter of former Montreal Canadiens General Manager Bob Gainey. Gainey won the Liberal nomination on May 15, 2023, defeating Fred Headon, vice president and general counsel of Air Canada, and 2021 La Pointe-de-l'Île candidate Jonas Fadeu.

Human rights activist and Green Party deputy leader Jonathan Pedneault was announced as the party's candidate on May 15, 2023.

The People's Party of Canada announced Tiny Olinga as their candidate. He previously contested Longueuil—Charles-LeMoyne in 2021.

== Results ==
Canadian federal by-election, June 19, 2023: Notre-Dame-de-Grâce—Westmount Resignation of Marc Garneau
| Party | Candidate | Votes | % | ±% |
|---|---|---|---|---|
| Liberal | Anna Gainey | 11,051 | 50.87 | −2.90 |
| New Democratic | Jean-François Filion | 3,001 | 13.81 | −5.39 |
| Conservative | Mathew Kaminski | 2,936 | 13.51 | −0.55 |
| Green | Jonathan Pedneault | 2,922 | 13.45 | +9.42 |
| Bloc Québécois | Laurence Massey | 985 | 4.53 | −0.75 |
| Centrist | Alex Trainman Montagano | 510 | 2.35 | |
| People's | Tiny Olinga | 141 | 0.65 | −2.64 |
| Rhinoceros | Sean Carson | 97 | 0.45 | |
| Christian Heritage | Yves Gilbert | 65 | 0.30 | +0.17 |
| No Affiliation (Note: Ardea is a member of the Communist League, an unregistered party; "No Affiliation" is EC's term for leaving the party affiliation blank on a candidate's registration form.) | Félix Vincent Ardea | 18 | 0.08 | |
| Total valid votes | | 21,726 | 99.25 | |
| Total rejected ballots | | 165 | 0.75 | −0.22 |
| Turnout | | | 29.93 | −32.63 |
| Eligible voters | | 73,152 | | |
| Liberal hold | | Swing | | +1.25 |
Source: Elections Canada

== 2021 result ==
2021 Canadian federal election: Notre-Dame-de-Grâce—Westmount
| Party | Candidate | Votes | % | ±% |
|---|---|---|---|---|
| Liberal | Marc Garneau | 24,510 | 53.76 | -2.37 |
| New Democratic | Emma Elbourne-Weinstock | 8,753 | 19.20 | +3.79 |
| Conservative | Mathew Kaminski | 6,412 | 14.06 | +2.61 |
| Bloc Québécois | Jordan Craig Larouche | 2,407 | 5.30 | +0.62 |
| Green | Sam Fairbrother | 1,835 | 4.02 | -6.70 |
| People's | David Freiheit | 1,498 | 3.29 | +2.17 |
| Marxist–Leninist | Rachel Hoffman | 117 | 0.26 | +0.12 |
| Christian Heritage | Geofryde Wandji | 59 | 0.13 | |
| Total valid votes | | 45,591 | | |
| Total rejected ballots | | 446 | | |
| Turnout | | 46,037 | 62.66 | -4.06 |
| Eligible voters | | 73,474 | | |
| Liberal hold | | Swing | | -3.10 |
Source: Elections Canada
