= STS-97 =

2000 American crewed spaceflight to the ISS

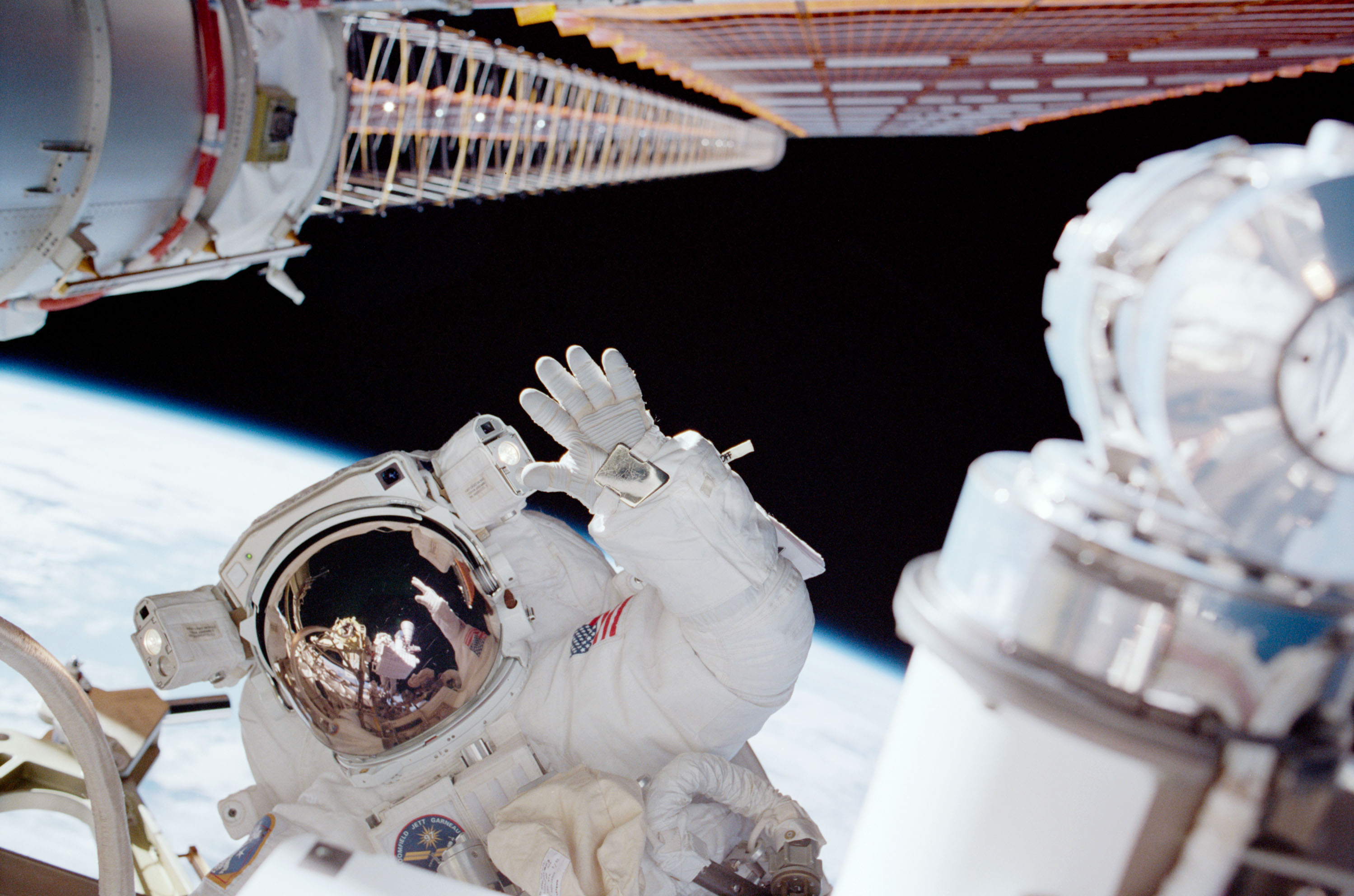
- Noriega on the newly-installed P6 truss, during EVA 2
- Names: Space Transportation System-97
- Mission type: ISS assembly
- Operator: NASA
- COSPAR ID: 2000-078A
- SATCAT no.: 26630
- Mission duration: 10 days, 19 hours, 58 minutes, 20 seconds
- Distance travelled: 7,203,000 kilometres (4,476,000 mi)

Spacecraft properties
- Spacecraft: Space Shuttle Endeavour
- Launch mass: 120,742 kilograms (266,191 lb)
- Landing mass: 89,758 kilograms (197,883 lb)
- Payload mass: 7,906 kilograms (17,430 lb)

Crew
- Crew size: 5
- Members: Brent W. Jett Jr.; Michael J. Bloomfield; Joseph R. Tanner; Marc Garneau; Carlos I. Noriega

Start of mission
- Launch date: 30 November 2000, 03:06 UTC
- Launch site: Kennedy, LC-39B

End of mission
- Landing date: 11 December 2000, 23:04 UTC
- Landing site: Kennedy, SLF Runway 15

Orbital parameters
- Reference system: Geocentric
- Regime: Low Earth
- Perigee altitude: 352 kilometres (219 mi)
- Apogee altitude: 365 kilometres (227 mi)
- Inclination: 51.6 degrees
- Period: 91.7 min

Docking with ISS
- Docking port: PMA-3 (Unity nadir)
- Docking date: 2 December 2000
- Undocking date: 9 December 2000
- Time docked: 6 days, 23 hours, 13 minutes
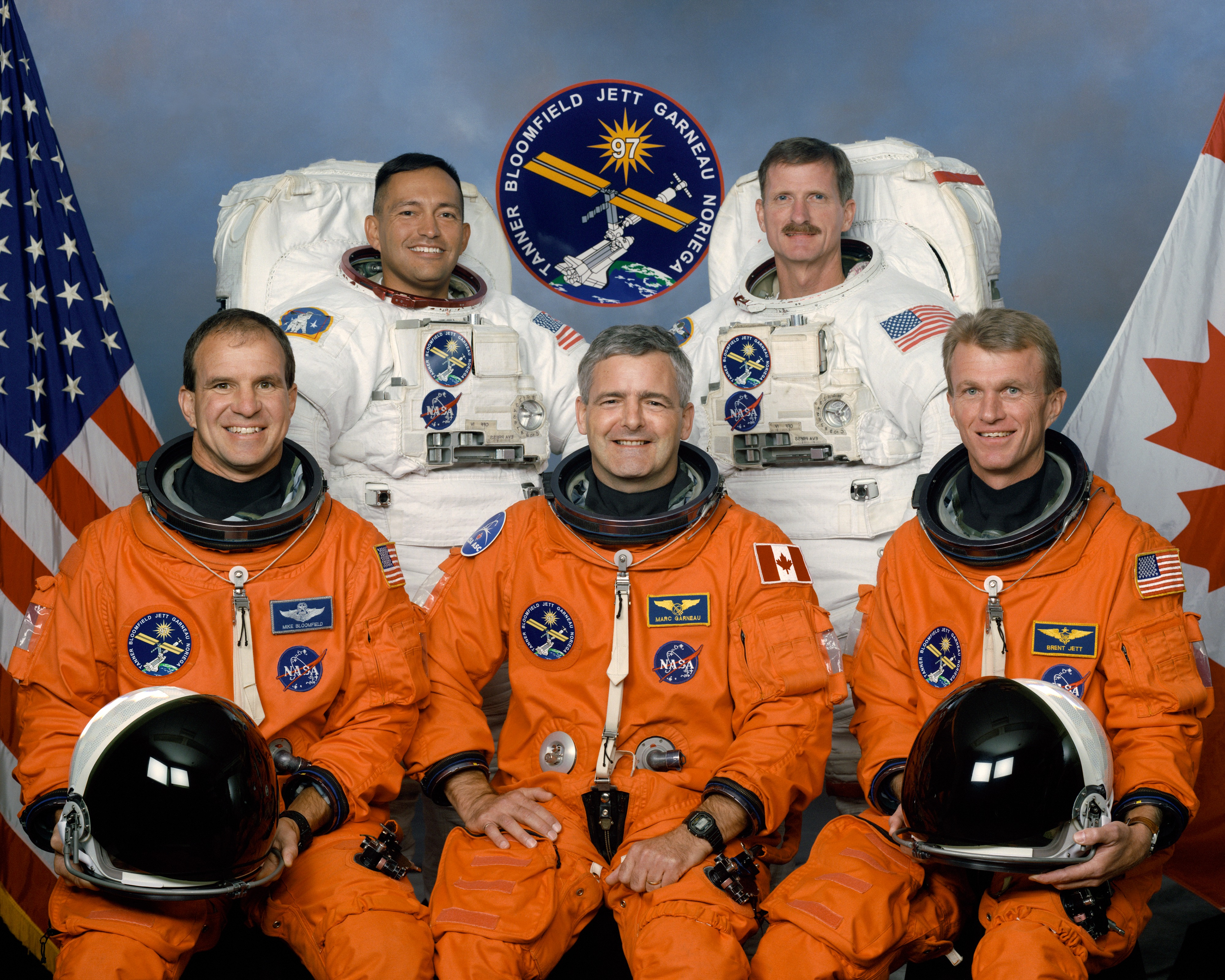
- Left to right – Front: Bloomfield, Garneau, Jett; Back: Noriega, Tanner Space Shuttle program

STS-97 was a Space Shuttle mission to the International Space Station (ISS) flown by Space Shuttle Endeavour. The mission launched from Kennedy Space Center, Florida on 30 November 2000, and was the 15th flight of Endeavour and the 101st Space Shuttle mission. The crew installed the first set of solar arrays to the ISS, prepared a docking port for arrival of the Destiny Laboratory Module, and delivered supplies for the station's crew. It was the last human spaceflight of the 20th century.

== Crew ==
Position	Astronaut
Commander	(United States) Brent W. Jett; Third spaceflight
Pilot	(United States) Michael J. Bloomfield; Second spaceflight
Mission Specialist 1	(United States) Joseph R. Tanner; Third spaceflight
Mission Specialist 2 Flight Engineer	(Canada) Marc Garneau, CSA; Third and last spaceflight
Mission Specialist 3	(United States) Carlos I. Noriega; Second and last spaceflight

=== Spacewalks ===
EVA 1 – Tanner and Noriega

- EVA 1 Start: 3 December 2000 – 18:35 UTC
- EVA 1 End: 4 December 2000 – 02:08 UTC
- Duration: 7 hours, 33 minutes

EVA 2 – Tanner and Noriega

- EVA 2 Start: 5 December 2000 – 17:21 UTC
- EVA 2 End: 5 December 2000 – 23:58 UTC
- Duration: 6 hours, 37 minutes

EVA 3 – Tanner and Noriega

- EVA 3 Start: 7 December 2000 – 16:13 UTC
- EVA 3 End: 7 December 2000 – 21:23 UTC
- Duration: 5 hours, 10 minutes

=== Crew seat assignments ===
Seat	Launch	Landing	Seats 1–4 are on the flight deck. Seats 5–7 are on the mid-deck.
1	Jett		Seats 1–4 are on the flight deck. Seats 5–7 are on the mid-deck.
2	Bloomfield		Seats 1–4 are on the flight deck. Seats 5–7 are on the mid-deck.
3	Tanner	Noriega	Seats 1–4 are on the flight deck. Seats 5–7 are on the mid-deck.
4	Garneau		Seats 1–4 are on the flight deck. Seats 5–7 are on the mid-deck.
5	Noriega	Tanner	Seats 1–4 are on the flight deck. Seats 5–7 are on the mid-deck.
6	Unused		Seats 1–4 are on the flight deck. Seats 5–7 are on the mid-deck.
7	Unused		Seats 1–4 are on the flight deck. Seats 5–7 are on the mid-deck.

== Mission highlights ==
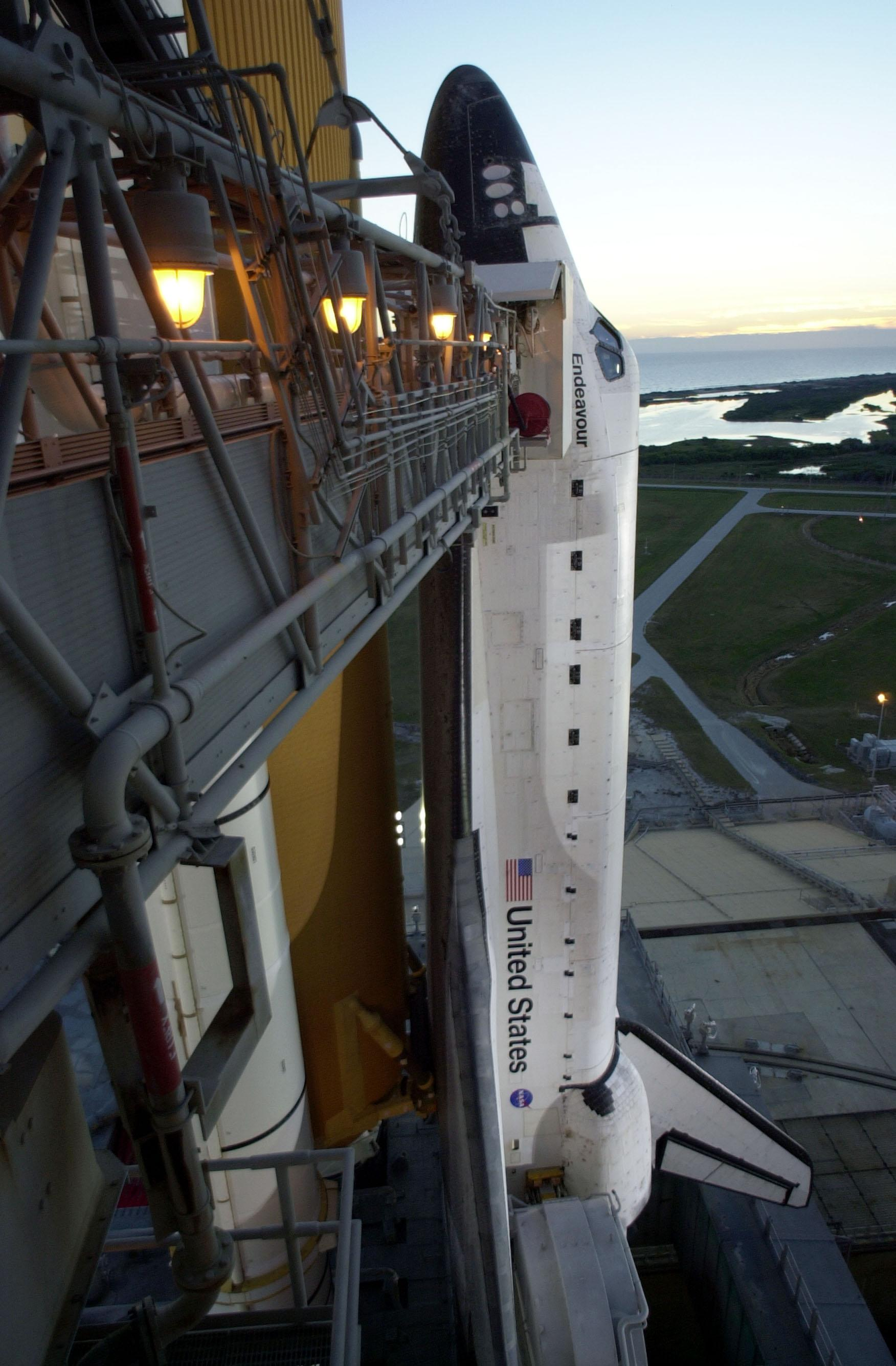
Endeavour on Launch Pad 39-B before STS-97.

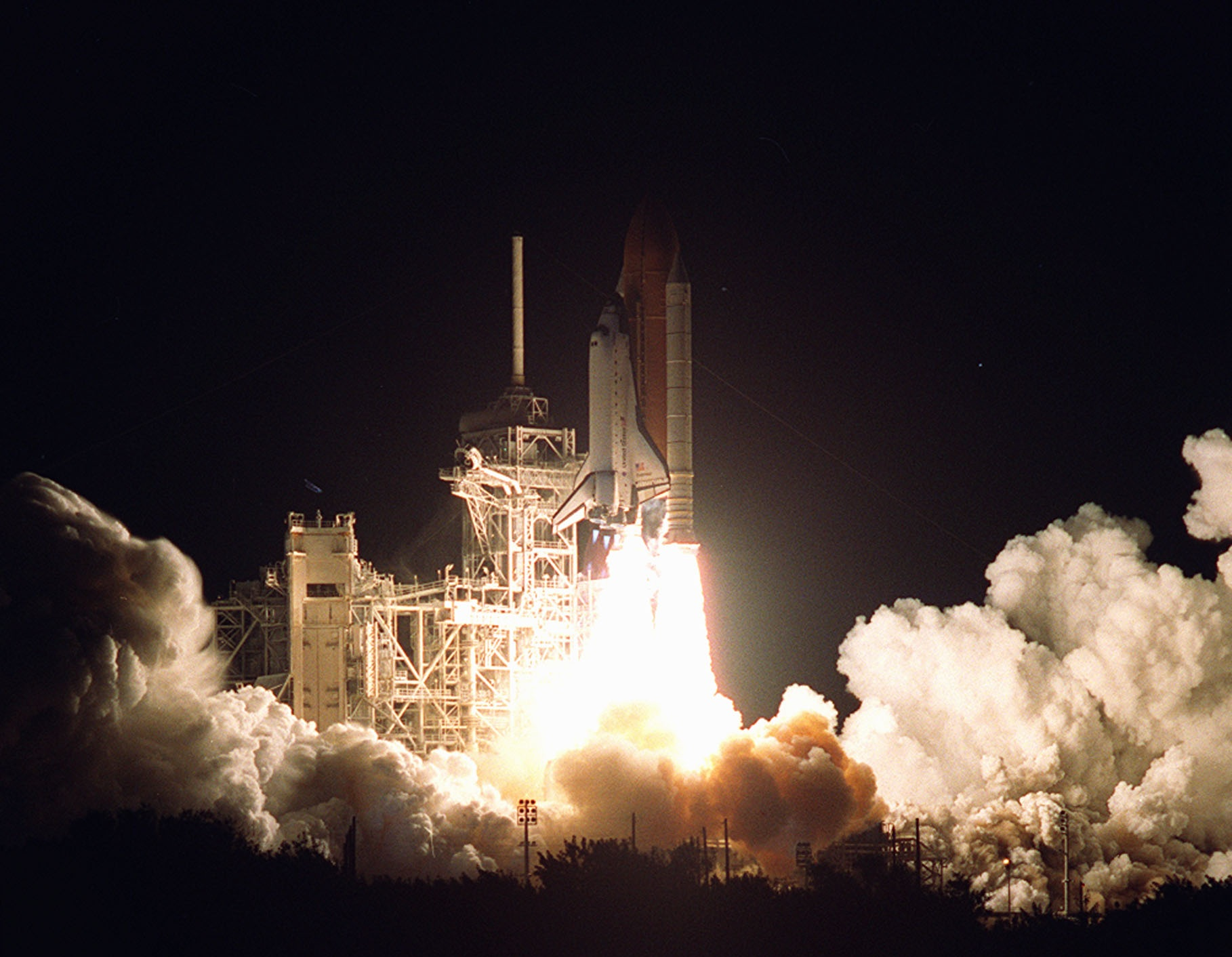
Launch of STS-97

During the 11-day mission, the primary objective was completed, which was to deliver and connect the first set of U.S.-provided solar arrays and the P6 Truss to the International Space Station. The astronauts completed three spacewalks, during which they prepared a docking port for arrival of the Destiny Laboratory Module, installed Floating Potential Probes to measure electrical potential surrounding the station, installed a camera cable outside the Unity Module, and transferred supplies, equipment and refuse between Endeavour and the station.

On Flight Day 3, Commander Brent Jett linked Endeavour to the ISS while 370 kilometers (230 mi) above northeast Kazakhstan.

The successful checkout of the Extravehicular Mobility Units (EMUs), the Simplified Aid For EVA Rescue (SAFER) units, the Canadarm (RMS), the Orbiter Space Vision System (OSVS) and the Orbiter Docking System (ODS) were all completed nominally. Also, the ODS centerline camera was installed with no misalignment noted.

From inside Endeavour, Canadian Mission Specialist Marc Garneau used the Canadarm to remove the 8 ton stainless steel P6 truss from the payload bay, maneuvering it into an overnight park position to warm its components. Mission Specialists Joseph Tanner and Carlos Noriega moved through Endeavour's docking tunnel and opened the hatch to the ISS docking port to leave supplies and computer hardware on the doorstep of the Station. On flight day 4, the Expedition 1 Commander William Shepherd, Pilot Yuri Gidzenko and Flight Engineer Sergei Krikalev – entered the Unity Module for the first time and retrieved the items left for them.

At 09:36 EST on 8 December 2000, the crew paid the first visit to the Expedition 1 crew residing in the space station. Until then the shuttle and the station had kept one hatch closed to maintain respective atmospheric pressures, allowing the shuttle crew to conduct their spacewalks and mission goals. After a welcome ceremony and briefing, the eight spacefarers conducted structural tests of the station and its solar arrays, transferred equipment, supplies and refuse back and forth between the spacecraft, and checked out the television camera cable installed by Tanner and Noriega for the upcoming mission.

On 9 December 2000, the two crews completed final transfers of supplies to the station and other items being returned to Earth. The Endeavour crew bade farewell to the Expedition 1 crew at 10:51 EST and closed the hatches between the spacecraft. After being docked together for 6 days, 23 hours and 13 minutes, Endeavour undocked from the station at 14:13 EST. Piloted by Michael Bloomfield, it then made an hour-long, tail-first circle of the station. The undocking took place 235 statute miles above the border of Kazakhstan and China. The final separation burn took place near the northeast coast of South America.

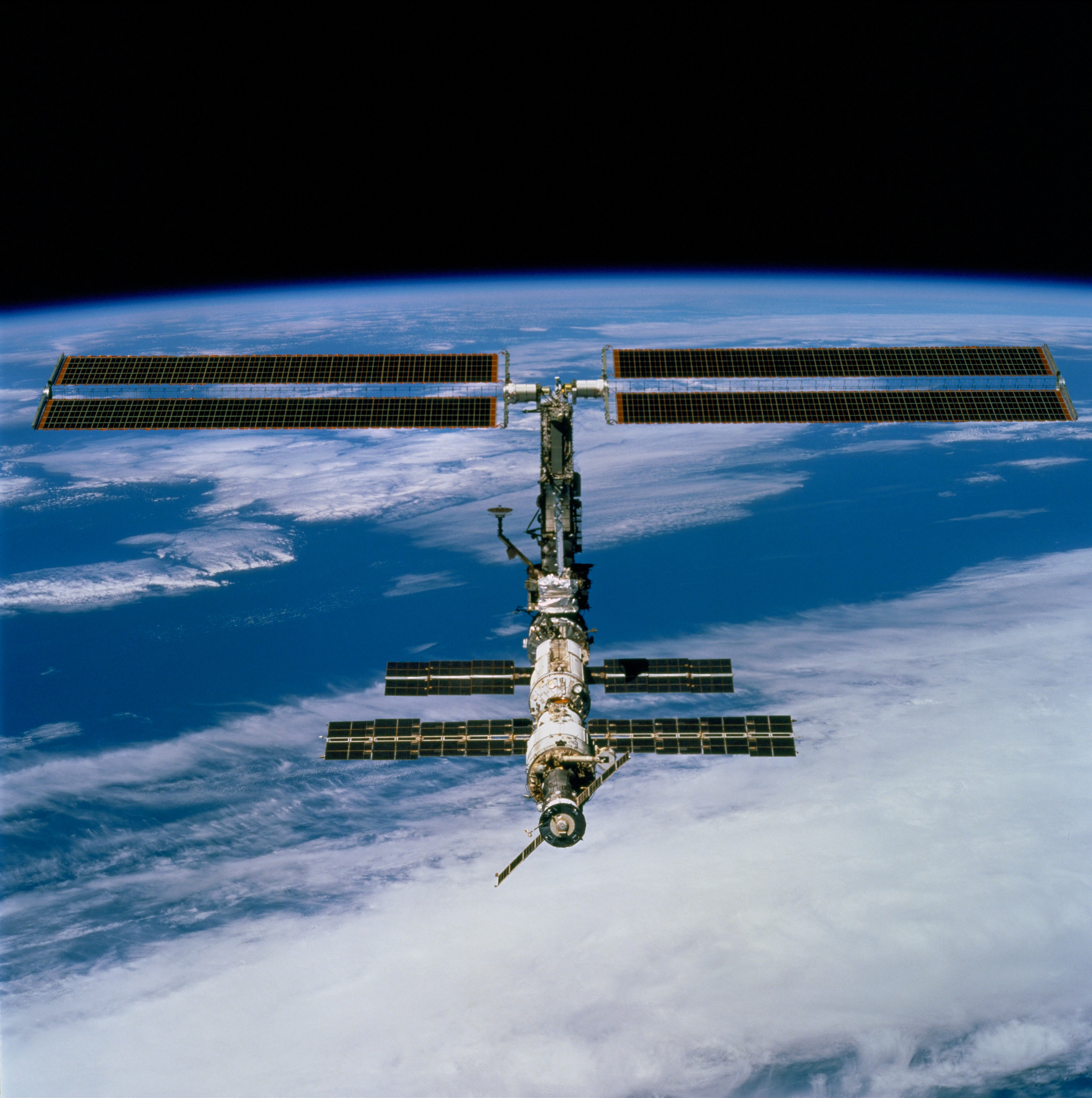
Taken from Endeavour on 9 December 2000, shortly after undocking. The new solar arrays are visible at the top.

== Wake-up calls ==
NASA began a tradition of playing music to astronauts during the Gemini program, which was first used to wake up a flight crew during Apollo 15. Each track is specially chosen, often by their families, and usually has a special meaning to an individual member of the crew, or is applicable to their daily activities.

Flight Day	Song	Artist/Composer
Day 2	"Stardust"	Willie Nelson
Day 3	"I Believe I Can Fly"	R. Kelly
Day 4	"Sunshine of Your Love"	Cream
Day 7	"O Mio Babbino Caro"	Puccini
Day 8	"Here Comes the Sun"	The Beatles
Day 9	"Rattled"	Traveling Wilburys
Day 10	"Back in the Saddle Again"	Gene Autry
Day 11	"Beyond the Sea"	Bobby Darin
Day 12	"I'll Be Home for Christmas"	Bing Crosby

== Images ==
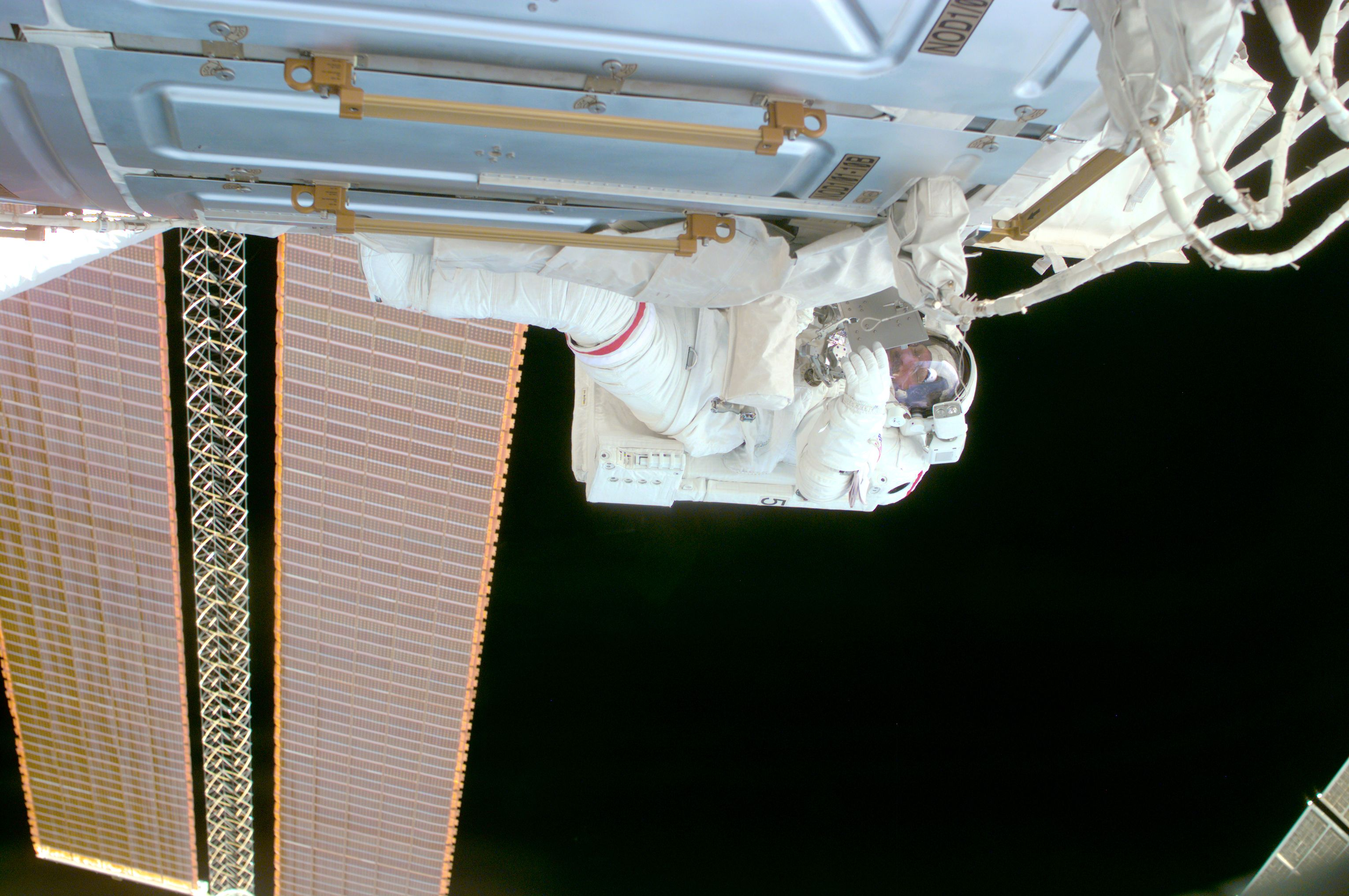
Tanner on the final spacewalk of the mission on 7 December 2000. Part of the new solar arrays can be seen on the left.

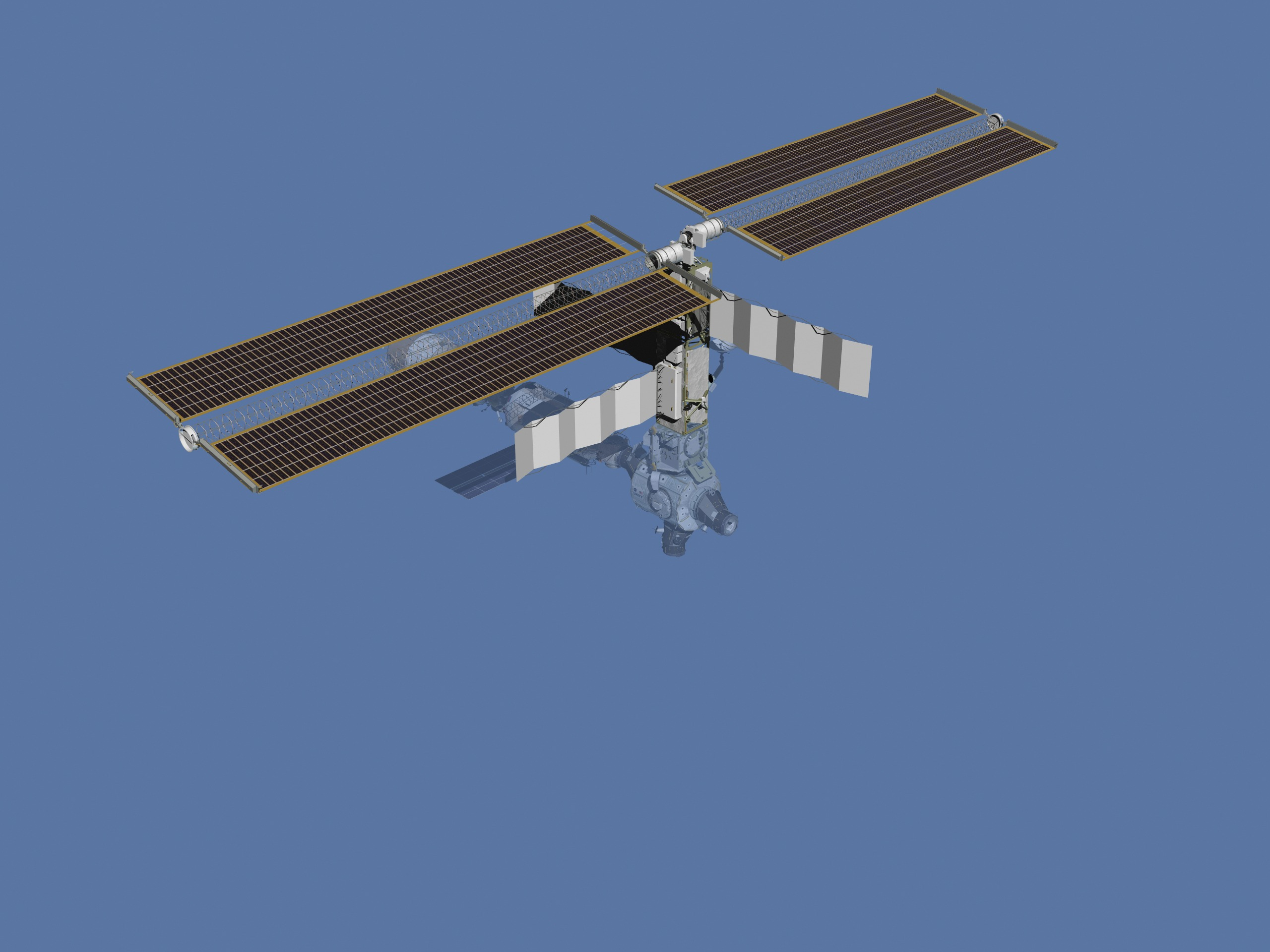
Illustration of the International Space Station after STS-97

== See also ==
- List of human spaceflights
- List of International Space Station spacewalks
- List of Space Shuttle missions
- List of spacewalks and moonwalks 1965–1999
- Outline of space science
