= Carlos I. Noriega =

Peruvian-American astronaut (born 1959)

Carlos Noriega
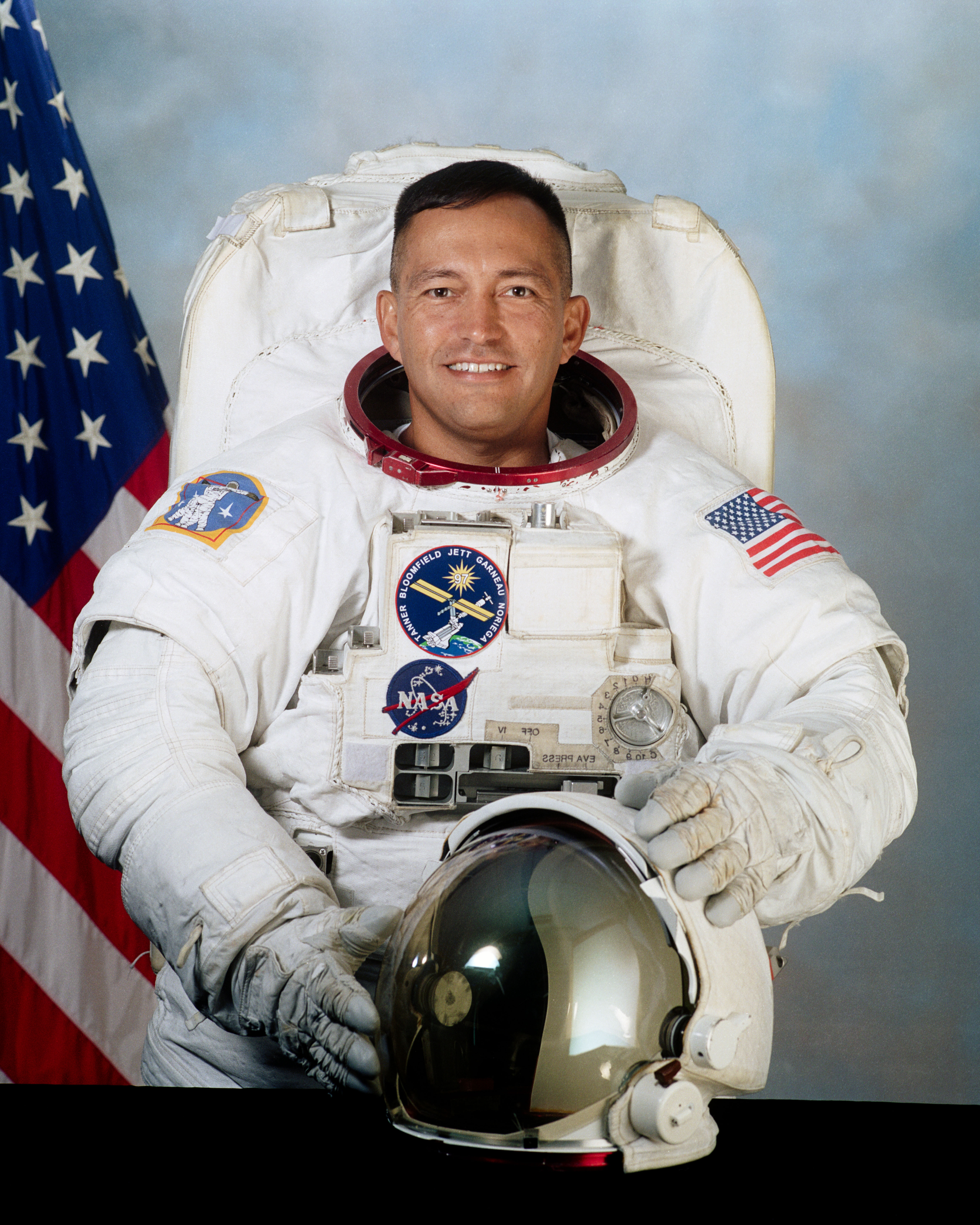
- Born: Carlos Ismael Noriega Jiménez; October 8, 1959 (age 66); Lima, Peru
- Education: University of Southern California (BS); Naval Postgraduate School (MS)
- Space career

NASA astronaut
- Rank: Lieutenant Colonel, USMC
- Time in space: 20d 1h 18m
- Selection: NASA Group 15 (1994)
- Total EVAs: 3
- Total EVA time: 19h 20m
- Missions: STS-84; STS-97

Carlos Ismael Noriega Jiménez (born 8 October 1959) is a Peruvian-American NASA employee, a former NASA astronaut and a retired U.S. Marine Corps lieutenant colonel. Carlos became the first Peruvian-born astronaut who went to space. Carlos was born in Lima, Peru and moved to Santa Clara, California in early childhood.

== Education ==
- 1977: Graduated from Wilcox High School, Santa Clara, California
- 1981: Bachelor of Science degree in computer science from University of Southern California
- 1990: Master of Science degree in computer science from the Naval Postgraduate School
- 1990: Master of Science degree in space systems operations from the Naval Postgraduate School.

== Awards and honors ==
- 2 Defense Meritorious Service Medal
- Air Medal with Combat Distinguishing Device
- Air Medal (Strike Flight Award)
- Navy Achievement Medal
- 2 NASA Space Flight Medal
- NASA Exceptional Service Medal

== Military career ==
Noriega was a member of the Naval ROTC unit at the University of Southern California and received his commission in the United States Marine Corps in 1981. Following graduation from flight school, he flew CH-46 Sea Knight helicopters with HMM-165 from 1983 to 1985 at Marine Corps Air Station Kaneohe Bay, Hawaii. Noriega made two 6-month shipboard deployments in the West Pacific/Indian Ocean, including operations in support of the Multinational Peacekeeping Force in Beirut, Lebanon. He completed his tour in Hawaii as the Base Operations Officer for Marine Air Base Squadron 24. In 1986, he was transferred to MCAS Tustin, California, where he served as the aviation safety officer and instructor pilot with HMT-301. In 1988, Noriega was selected to attend the Naval Postgraduate School in Monterey, California, where he earned two master of science degrees. Upon graduation in September 1990, he was assigned to United States Space Command in Colorado Springs, Colorado. In addition to serving as a Space Surveillance Center Commander, he was responsible for several software development projects and was ultimately the command representative for the development and integration of the major space and missile warning computer system upgrades for Cheyenne Mountain Air Force Station. At the time of his selection, he was serving on the staff of the 1st Marine Aircraft Wing in Okinawa, Japan.

He logged nearly 3,000 flight hours during his time in the military, in which he flew more than 20 different aircraft.

== NASA career ==
Selected by NASA in December 1994, Noriega reported to the Johnson Space Center in March 1995. He completed a year of training and evaluation, and was qualified for assignment as a mission specialist in May 1996. He held technical assignments in the Astronaut Office EVA/Robotics and Operations Planning Branches. Noriega flew on STS-84 in 1997 and STS-97 in 2000. He has logged over 461 hours in space including over 19 EVA hours in 3 spacewalks. Following STS-97, Noriega trained as the backup commander for ISS Expedition 6 and later as a member of the crew of STS-121. In July 2004, Noriega was replaced by Piers Sellers on the crew of STS-121 due to a temporary medical condition. While awaiting future flight assignment Noriega served as Chief, Exploration Systems Engineering Division, Engineering Directorate, Johnson Space Center. In January 2005, Noriega retired from the NASA Astronaut Corps, but continues to serve as the Manager, Advanced Projects Office, Constellation Program, Johnson Space Center.

== Spaceflight experience ==
STS-84 (May 15–24, 1997), was NASA's sixth Space Shuttle mission to rendezvous and dock with the Russian Space Station Mir. During this 9-day mission the crew aboard Space Shuttle Atlantis conducted a number of secondary experiments, and transferred nearly 4 tons of supplies and experiment equipment between Atlantis and the Mir station. During STS-84, Noriega logged approximately a total of 239 hours and 20 minutes in space traveling 3.6 million miles in 144 orbits of the Earth.

STS-97 Endeavour (November 30 to December 11, 2000) was the fifth Space Shuttle mission dedicated to the assembly of the International Space Station. While docked to the Station, the crew installed the first set of U.S. solar arrays, performed three spacewalks (STS-97 EVA 1, STS-97 EVA 2, and STS-97 EVA 3), in addition to delivering supplies and equipment to the station's first resident crew. Mission duration was 10 days, 19 hours, 57 minutes, and traveled 4.5 million miles.

== See also ==
- Hispanics in the United States Marine Corps
- List of Hispanic astronauts
