= Notre-Dame-de-Grâce—Westmount =

Federal electoral district in Quebec, Canada

Coordinates: 45°28′N 73°37′W

Quebec electoral district
- Interactive map of riding boundaries from the 2025 federal election

Federal electoral district
- Legislature: House of Commons
MP
Anna Gainey
Liberal
- District created: 2013
- First contested: 2015
- Last contested: 2023 by-election
- District webpage: profile, map

Demographics
- Population (2016): 104,974
- Electors (2019): 76,499
- Area (km²): 17
- Pop. density (per km²): 6,174.9
- Census division: Montreal (part)
- Census subdivision(s): Montreal (part), Westmount, Montréal-Ouest

Notre-Dame-de-Grâce—Westmount is a federal electoral district on the Island of Montreal in Quebec.

== History ==
The riding was created by the 2012 federal electoral boundaries redistribution out of Notre-Dame-de-Grâce—Lachine (40%), Westmount—Ville-Marie (59%) and Outremont (1%). and was legally defined in the 2013 representation order. It came into effect upon the call of the 2015 Canadian federal election.

Following the 2022 Canadian federal electoral redistribution, it lost the territory south of Boul. Décaire and west of Ch. Côte-Saint-Luc to Mount Royal and gained the territory west of Rue Notre-Dame and Av. Atwater from Ville-Marie—Le Sud-Ouest—Île-des-Sœurs.

== Geography ==
The riding includes the towns of Westmount and Montreal West as well as the neighbourhood of Notre-Dame-de-Grâce in the borough of Côte-des-Neiges–Notre-Dame-de-Grâce, and a small part of the borough of Ville-Marie surrounding Îlot-Trafalgar-Gleneagles in Montreal.

In the last few elections, the Liberals have dominated throughout the riding, winning a majority of the vote in every neighbourhood. Their strongest neighbourhoods are the Loyola section Notre-Dame-de-Grâce, Montreal West and the area around Îlot-Trafalgar-Gleneagles. The NDP is strongest in Notre-Dame-de-Grâce District, while the Tories are strongest in Westmount.

== Demographics ==
According to the 2021 Canadian census, 2023 representation order

Racial groups: 65.4% White, 8.7% Black, 4.8% Chinese, 4.1% Arab, 3.2% South Asian, 3.0% Latin American, 2.9% West Asian, 2.3% Filipino, 1.5% Korean, 1.3% Southeast Asian
Languages: 43.4% English, 31.1% French, 3.5% Spanish, 2.9% Arabic, 2.8% Mandarin, 2.6% Persian, 2.0% Italian, 1.6% Russian, 1.2% Korean, 1.2% Romanian
Religions: 44.6% Christian (27.2% Catholic, 3.8% Christian Orthodox, 2.3% Anglican, 11.3% Other), 9.4% Jewish, 7.7% Muslim, 1.3% Hindu, 34.9% None
Median income: $40,000 (2020)
Average income: $83,200 (2020)

== Members of Parliament ==
This riding has elected the following members of Parliament:

Parliament	Years	Member	Party
Notre-Dame-de-Grâce—Westmount; Riding created from Notre-Dame-de-Grâce—Lachine, Outremont and Westmount—Ville-Marie
42nd	2015–2019	Marc Garneau	Liberal
43rd	2019–2021	Marc Garneau	Liberal
44th	2021–2023	Marc Garneau	Liberal
44th	2023–2025	Anna Gainey	Liberal
45th	2025–present	Anna Gainey	Liberal

== Election results ==
View source data.
Graph of election results in Notre-Dame-de-Grâce—Westmount (minor parties that never got 2% of the vote or didn't run consistently are omitted)

=== 2023 representation order ===
2025 Canadian federal election
Party	Candidate	Votes	%	±%	Expenditures
Liberal	Anna Gainey	34,226	63.99	+11.15	$106,815.03
Conservative	Neil Drabkin	10,517	19.66	+6.21	$15,516.78
New Democratic	Malcolm Lewis-Richmond	3,956	7.40	−12.68	$12,780.50
Bloc Québécois	Félix-Antoine Brault	2,652	4.96	–1.02	$3,049.13
Green	Arnold Downey	1,331	2.49	−1.51	$5,956.73
Independent	Alex Trainman Montagano	264	0.49	N/A	$771.08
People's	Marc Perez	256	0.48	−2.77	$0.00
Marxist–Leninist	Rachel Hoffman	162	0.30	+0.04	$0.00
Rhinoceros	Stephen Hensley	126	0.24	N/A	$0.00
Total valid votes		53,490	99.11	+0.11	$126,717.58
Total rejected ballots		482	0.89	–0.11	
Turnout		53,972	67.23	+4.79	
Eligible voters		80,279			
Liberal notional hold		Swing		+2.47	
Source: Elections Canada

2021 federal election redistributed results
Party	Vote	%
Liberal	25,711	52.83
New Democratic	9,770	20.08
Conservative	6,547	13.45
Bloc Québécois	2,911	5.98
Green	1,946	4.00
People's	1,582	3.25
Marxist-Leninist	128	0.26
Christian Heritage	55	0.11
Marijuana	14	0.03
Total valid votes	48,664	99.00
Rejected ballots	491	1.00
Registered voters/ estimated turnout	78,724	62.44

=== 2023 representation order ===
Canadian federal by-election, June 19, 2023 Resignation of Marc Garneau
Party	Candidate	Votes	%	±%
Liberal	Anna Gainey	11,051	50.87	−2.90
New Democratic	Jean-François Filion	3,001	13.81	−5.39
Conservative	Mathew Kaminski	2,936	13.51	−0.55
Green	Jonathan Pedneault	2,922	13.45	+9.42
Bloc Québécois	Laurence Massey	985	4.53	−0.75
Centrist	Alex Trainman Montagano	510	2.35	
People's	Tiny Olinga	141	0.65	−2.64
Rhinoceros	Sean Carson	97	0.45	
Christian Heritage	Yves Gilbert	65	0.30	+0.17
No Affiliation (Note: Ardea is a member of the Communist League, an unregistered party; "No Affiliation" is EC's term for leaving the party affiliation blank on a candidate's registration form.)	Félix Vincent Ardea	18	0.08	
Total valid votes		21,726	99.25	
Total rejected ballots		165	0.75	−0.22
Turnout			29.93	−32.63
Eligible voters		73,152		
Liberal hold		Swing		+1.25
Source: Elections Canada

2021 Canadian federal election
Party	Candidate	Votes	%	±%	Expenditures
Liberal	Marc Garneau	24,510	53.76	−2.52	$61,675.31
New Democratic	Emma Elbourne-Weinstock	8,753	19.20	+3.79	$23,238.48
Conservative	Mathew Kaminski	6,412	14.06	+2.62	$777.38
Bloc Québécois	Jordan Craig Larouche	2,407	5.28	+0.59	$2,242.01
Green	Sam Fairbrother	1,835	4.02	−6.70	$5,916.70
People's	David Freiheit	1,498	3.29	+2.16	$17,259.62
Marxist–Leninist	Rachel Hoffman	117	0.26	+0.12	$0.00
Christian Heritage	Geofryde Wandji	59	0.13	–	$1,300.00
Total valid votes/expense limit		45,591	99.03	–	$108,061.50
Total rejected ballots		446	0.97	+0.09	
Turnout		46,037	62.55	−3.68	
Eligible voters		73,595			
Liberal hold		Swing		−3.16	
Source: Elections Canada

2019 Canadian federal election
Party	Candidate	Votes	%	±%	Expenditures
Liberal	Marc Garneau	28,323	56.28	−1.39	$77,287.54
New Democratic	Franklin Gertler	7,753	15.41	−6.35	$45,608.88
Conservative	Neil Drabkin	5,759	11.44	−2.93	none listed
Green	Robert Green	5,397	10.73	+7.67	$9,697.34
Bloc Québécois	Jennifer Jetté	2,359	4.69	+2.21	none listed
People's	André Valiquette	565	1.12	–	$4,895.49
Independent	Jeffery A. Thomas	98	0.19	–	none listed
Marxist–Leninist	Rachel Hoffman	67	0.13	−0.22	$0.00
Total valid votes/expense limit		50,321	99.12		
Total rejected ballots		446	0.88		
Turnout		50,767	66.23		
Eligible voters		76,649			
Liberal hold		Swing		+4.96	
Source: Elections Canada

2015 Canadian federal election
Party	Candidate	Votes	%	±%	Expenditures
Liberal	Marc Garneau	29,755	57.67	+19.43	$116,633.55
New Democratic	James Hughes	11,229	21.76	-13.29	$121,985.65
Conservative	Richard Sagala	7,414	14.37	-3.28	$23,826.12
Green	Melissa Kate Wheeler	1,581	3.06	-1.32	$1,243.50
Bloc Québécois	Simon Quesnel	1,282	2.48	-1.58	$2,358.94
Marxist–Leninist	Rachel Hoffman	181	0.35	–	–
Independent	Lisa Julie Cahn	151	0.29	–	–
Total valid votes/Expense limit		51,593	99.40	–	$214,383.86
Total rejected ballots		311	0.60	–	–
Turnout		51,904	65.02	–	–
Eligible voters		79,832	–	–	–
Source: Elections Canada

2011 federal election redistributed results
Party	Vote	%
Liberal	17,072	38.24
New Democratic	15,648	35.05
Conservative	7,878	17.65
Green	1,955	4.38
Bloc Québécois	1,816	4.07
Others	271	0.61

== See also ==
- List of Canadian electoral districts
- Historical federal electoral districts of Canada
