= Marc Garneau =

Canadian astronaut and politician (1949–2025)

The Honourable Marc Garneau PC CC CD
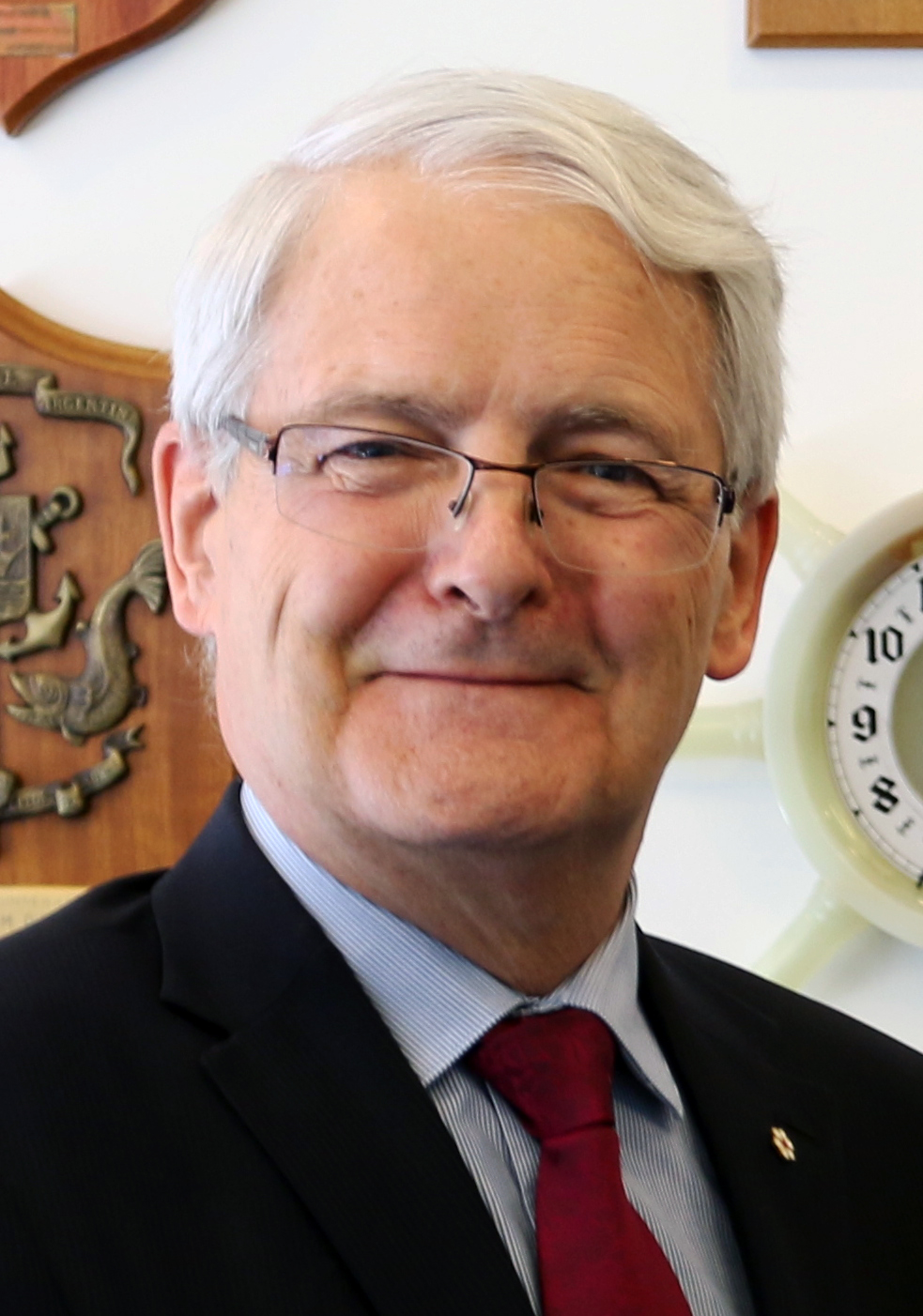
- Garneau in 2018 as transport minister

Minister of Foreign Affairs
- In office January 12, 2021 – October 26, 2021
- Prime Minister: Justin Trudeau
- Preceded by: François-Philippe Champagne
- Succeeded by: Mélanie Joly

Minister of Transport
- In office November 4, 2015 – January 12, 2021
- Prime Minister: Justin Trudeau
- Preceded by: Lisa Raitt
- Succeeded by: Omar Alghabra

Member of Parliament for Westmount–Ville-Marie (2008–15) / Notre-Dame-de-Grâce—Westmount (2015‍–‍23)
- In office October 14, 2008 – March 8, 2023
- Preceded by: Lucienne Robillard
- Succeeded by: Anna Gainey

President of the Canadian Space Agency
- In office November 22, 2001 – November 28, 2005
- Appointed by: Jean Chretien
- Preceded by: William MacDonald Evans
- Succeeded by: Laurier J. Boisvert

Personal details
- Born: Joseph Jean-Pierre Marc Garneau; February 23, 1949 Quebec City, Quebec, Canada
- Died: June 4, 2025 (aged 76) Montreal, Quebec, Canada
- Party: Liberal
- Spouses: Pamela Soame (m. 1992–2025); Jacqueline Brown (m. 1973; died 1987)
- Education: Royal Military College of Canada (BS); Canadian Forces College; Imperial College London (PhD)

Military service
- Allegiance: Canada
- Branch: Maritime Command
- Service years: 1974–1989
- Rank: Captain(N)
- Space career

NRC/CSA astronaut
- Time in space: 29 days, 2 hours, 1 minute
- Selection: 1983 NRC Group; NASA Group 14 (1992)
- Mission: STS-41-G; STS-77; STS-97

Joseph Jean-Pierre Marc Garneau (French pronunciation: [maʁk ɡaʁno]; February 23, 1949 – June 4, 2025) was a Canadian Armed Forces officer, astronaut and politician. Garneau served as a naval officer before being selected as an astronaut as part of the 1983 NRC Group. He became the first Canadian in space on October 5, 1984, and flew on three Space Shuttle missions. From 2001 to 2005, Garneau was president of the Canadian Space Agency (CSA). Garneau entered politics and was elected to the House of Commons in 2008, serving as a Montreal-area member of Parliament (MP) until 2023. A member of the Liberal Party, Garneau served as Minister of Foreign Affairs from January to October in 2021 and as Minister of Transport from 2015 to 2021.

Born in Quebec City, Garneau joined the Canadian Armed Forces, graduating with a bachelor's degree in engineering physics from the Royal Military College of Canada in 1970, and serving with Maritime Command (now known as the Royal Canadian Navy) as a combat systems engineer. He earned a PhD in electrical engineering from the Imperial College of Science and Technology in 1973. In 1983, Garneau was selected to be an astronaut. In 1984, he became the first Canadian in space as part of STS-41-G and served on two subsequent missions: STS-77 and STS-97. He was appointed executive vice-president of the CSA in February 2001, before becoming the agency's president in November. Garneau resigned from the CSA in 2005, and was elected to Parliament in 2008. The Liberal Party formed government following the 2015 election and Garneau was appointed to Cabinet. After serving as transport minister and foreign affairs minister, Prime Minister Justin Trudeau did not appoint Garneau to another portfolio after a Cabinet shuffle following the 2021 election. In 2023, Garneau retired from politics.

== Early life ==
Joseph Jean-Pierre Marc Garneau was born into a military family on February 23, 1949, in Quebec City, Quebec, Canada. His grandfather, Gérard Garneau, was a colonel who served in the Canadian military during World War I. His father, André Garneau, was a French Canadian from Quebec City who joined the military during World War II. His mother, Jean Richardson, was English Canadian from Sussex, New Brunswick, and was a nurse during World War II. She met André while nursing him at a military hospital before he deployed overseas. After the war, André continued his service in the Canadian military, rising through the ranks to become a brigadier general. The Garneau family had four sons, beginning with Braun, followed by Marc, Charles, and Philippe Garneau.

== Education and military career ==
Garneau's frequent relocations due to his father's occupation during his upbringing necessitated his attendance at various schools, spanning both primary and secondary education, in Quebec City, Saint-Jean-sur-Richelieu and London, England. He graduated from the Royal Military College of Canada in 1970 with a bachelor of science in engineering physics and began his career in the Canadian Forces Maritime Command.

In 1973, he received a PhD in electrical engineering from the Imperial College of Science and Technology in London, England. His thesis was titled "The Perception of Facial Images". The Photofit analogue computer was used by him to discriminate facial features. In 1974, Garneau served as a naval combat systems engineer aboard HMCS Algonquin.

From 1982 to 1983, he attended the Canadian Forces Command and Staff College in Toronto. While there, he was promoted to the rank of commander and was transferred to Ottawa in 1983. In January 1986, he was promoted to captain. Garneau retired from the Canadian Forces in 1989.

== Space career ==
On December 5, 1983, the National Research Council of Canada (NRC) announced Canada's first group of astronauts that were to fly on NASA's Space Transportation System. Garneau joined this first Canadian Astronaut Program (CAP) group, as one of six chosen from over 4,300 applicants. Of these six original astronauts, he was the only military officer. Garneau became the first Canadian to reach space on October 5, 1984, when Space Shuttle Challenger flew into low Earth orbit.

Garneau's first spaceflight was aboard the Space Shuttle Challenger, on the STS-41-G mission, from October 5 to 13, 1984. He was a payload specialist. He was promoted to the rank of Navy Captain in 1986, and left the Canadian Forces in 1989, to become deputy director of the CAP. In 1992–93, he underwent further training to become a mission specialist. He worked as CAPCOM for a number of shuttle flights and was on two further flights himself: STS-77 (May 19 to 29, 1996) and STS-97 (to the ISS, November 30 to December 11, 2000). He logged 677 hours in space.

On February 1, 2001, Garneau was appointed executive vice-president of the Canadian Space Agency (CSA). On September 28, 2001, the government announced his appointment as president of the CSA, replacing Mac Evans in that position on November 22, 2001. Garneau resigned from the Canadian Space Agency on November 28, 2005.

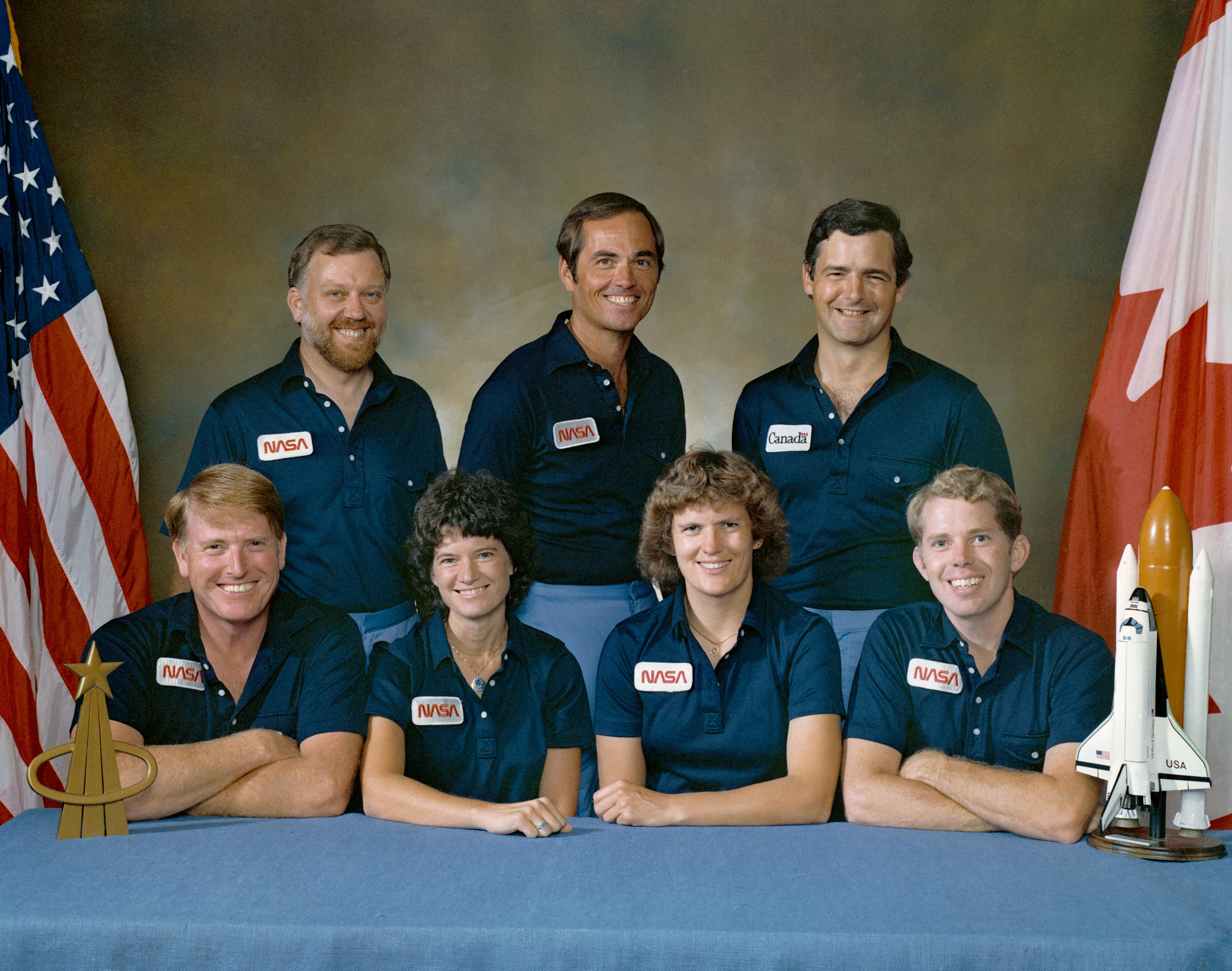
Crew members of STS-41-G in 1984

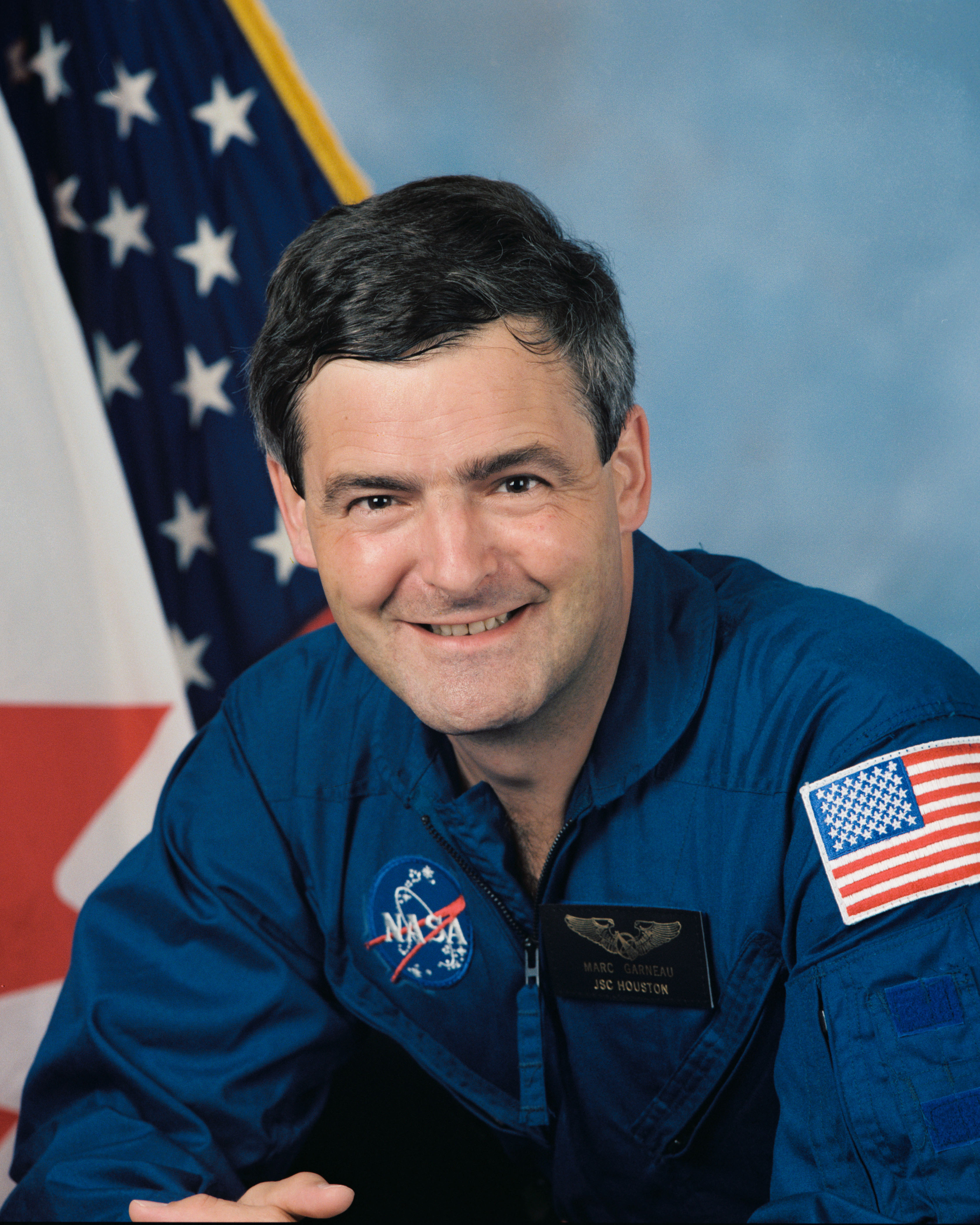
Garneau in 1992, while training with NASA as a mission specialist

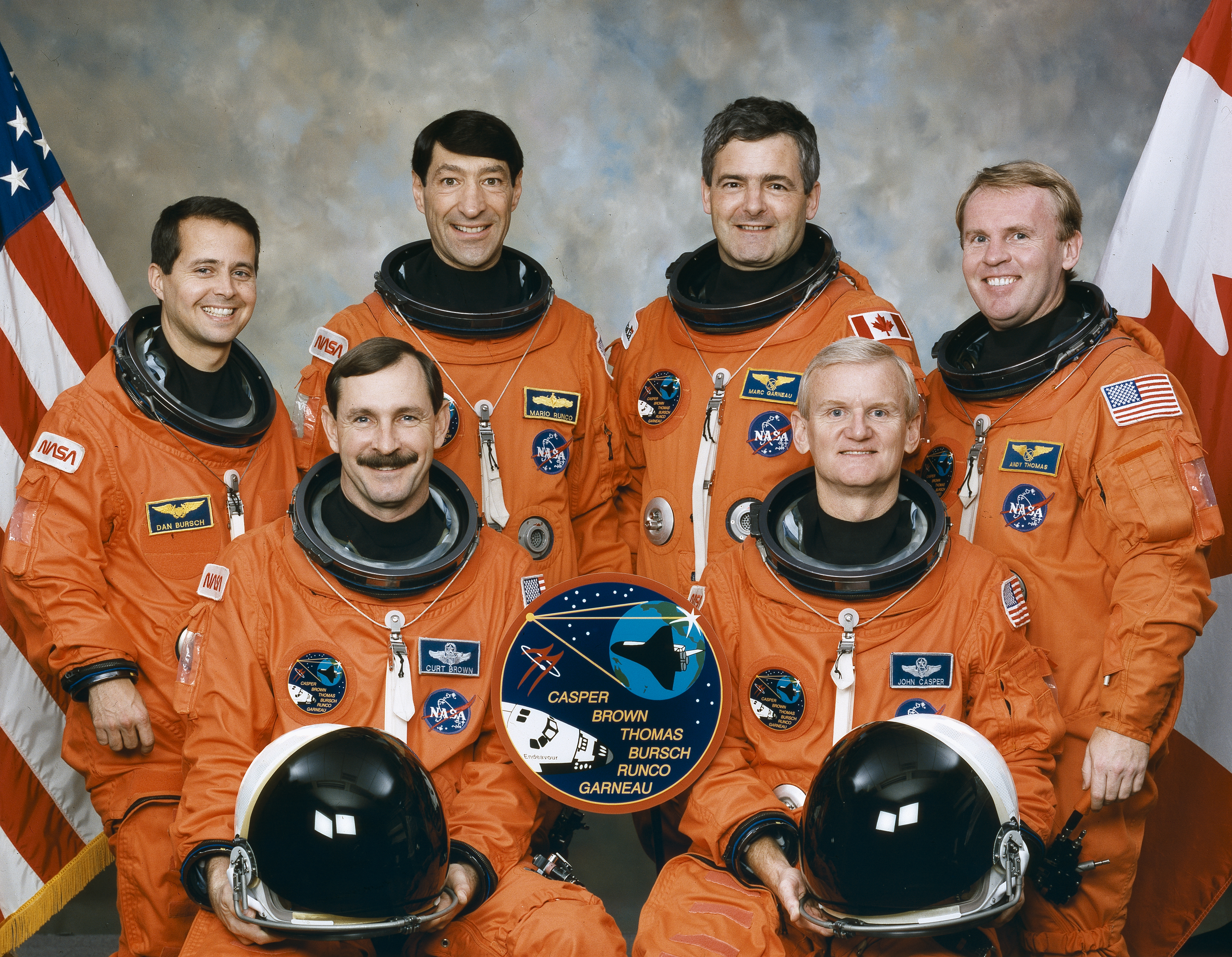
Crew members of STS-77 in 1996

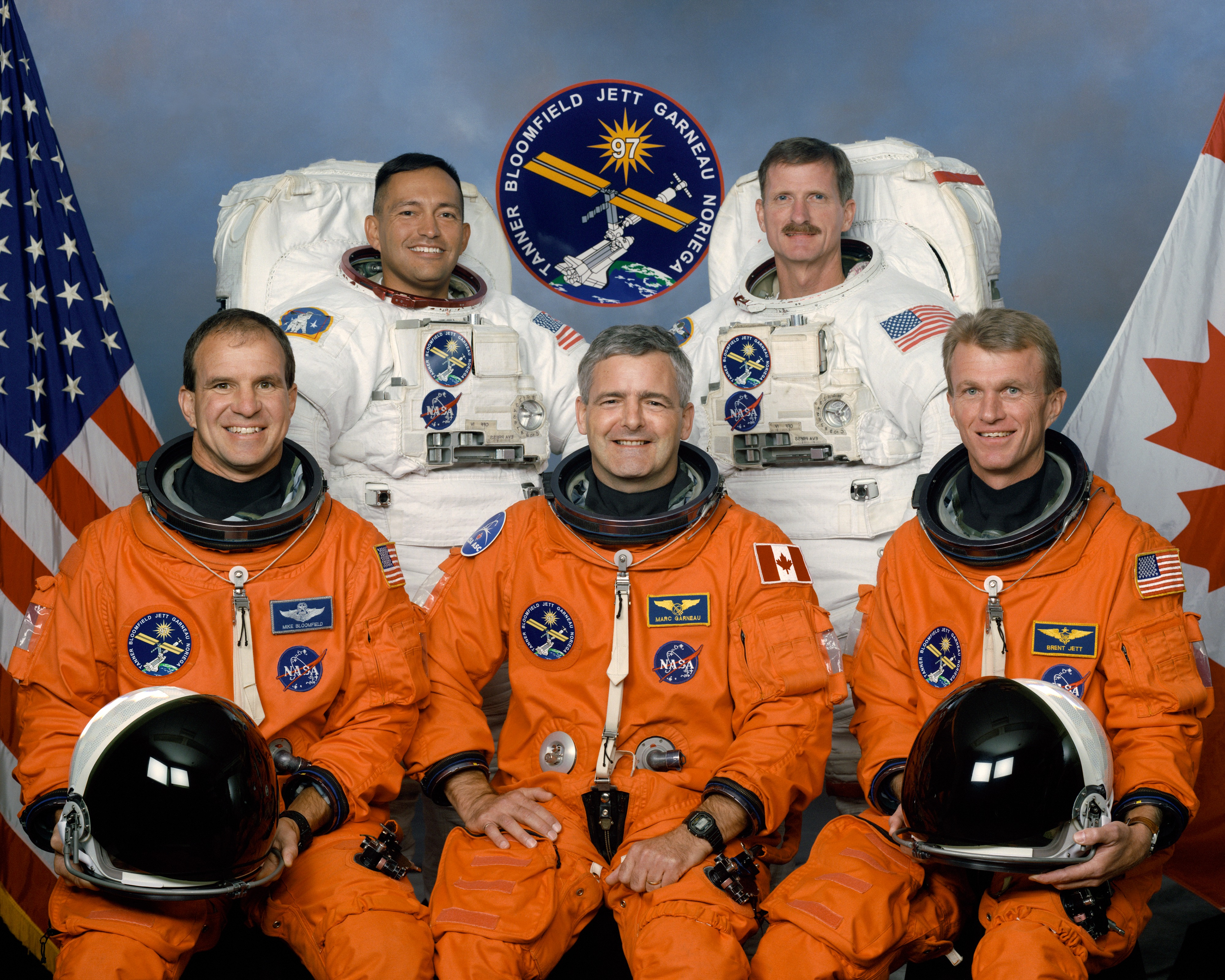
Crew members of STS-97 in 1999

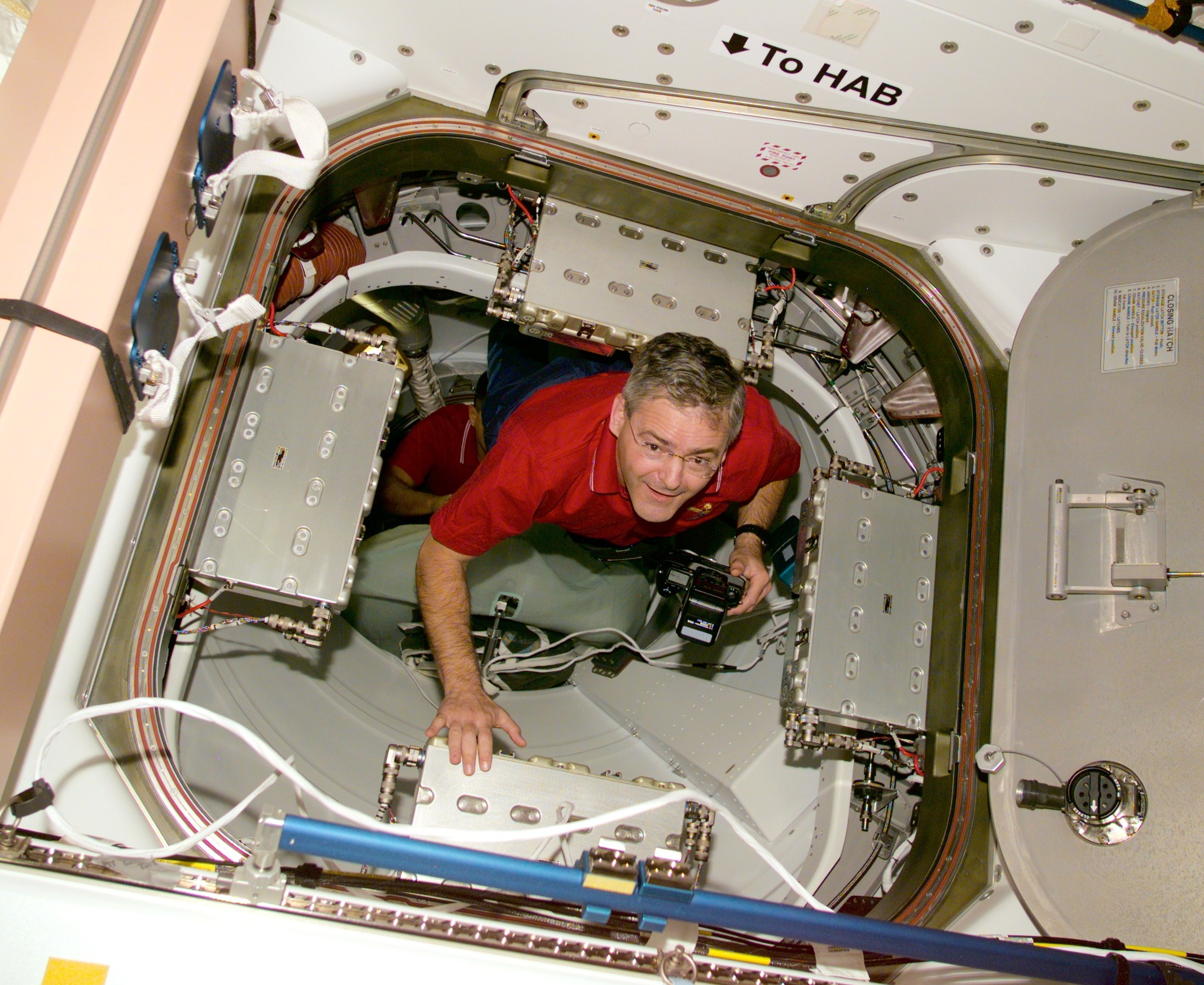
Garneau floats in the hatchway that leads to Endeavour

== Political career ==
Garneau served as the Member of Parliament (MP) in the Canadian House of Commons for over 14 years. He represented two electoral districts during this time, first Westmount—Ville-Marie, and after the 2012 Canadian federal electoral redistribution, Notre-Dame-de-Grâce—Westmount. His first attempt to win elected office was unsuccessful, as he placed second in the Vaudreuil—Soulanges electoral district during the 2006 federal election. He first won elected office as a result of the 2008 federal election, winning his seat by over 9,000 votes. He was re-elected to the House of Commons in the 2011 federal election by 642 votes. His electoral district was abolished and he stood for office in the newly created Notre-Dame-de-Grâce—Westmount district for the 2015 federal election. He won the election with a majority of over 18,000.

On November 28, 2012, Garneau announced his candidacy for the leadership of the Liberal Party to be decided in April 2013. On March 13, 2013, Garneau formally withdrew his bid for the party leadership. On November 4, 2015, Garneau was appointed Minister of Transport in the 29th Canadian Ministry of Prime Minister Justin Trudeau. He became Minister of Foreign Affairs on January 12, 2021, after a cabinet reshuffle.

=== Initial steps (2006–2008) ===
Garneau resigned as the president of the Canadian Space Agency to run for the Liberal Party of Canada in the 2006 federal election in the riding of Vaudreuil—Soulanges, which was then held by Meili Faille of the Bloc Québécois. The Liberal Party's support dropped off considerably in Quebec after the Sponsorship scandal and though considered a star candidate, Garneau lost to Faille by over 9,000 votes.

In the 2006 Liberal Party leadership election Garneau announced his support for perceived front-runner Michael Ignatieff, who lost to Stéphane Dion on the final ballot. With the resignation of Liberal MP Jean Lapierre in 2007, Garneau expressed interest in being the party's candidate in Lapierre's former riding of Outremont. Dion instead appointed Jocelyn Coulon as the party's candidate, who went on to be defeated by the New Democratic Party's Thomas Mulcair in the by-election.

In May 2007, Garneau filed nomination papers to be the party's candidate in Westmount—Ville-Marie, after former Liberal Party deputy leader Lucienne Robillard announced she would not be seeking re-election. However, a week after filing his nomination papers Dion announced that he had hand-picked a candidate for the riding. Garneau later withdrew his nomination papers and announced he no longer had an interest in politics. In October 2007, Garneau and Dion held a joint news conference where they announced that Garneau would be the Liberal Party candidate in Westmount—Ville-Marie. Robillard announced her resignation as Member of Parliament in January and a by-election was later scheduled for September 8, 2008. However, the by-election was cancelled during the campaign when Prime Minister Stephen Harper called a general election for October 14, 2008. Though some pundits predicted a close race between Garneau and NDP candidate Anne Lagacé-Dowson, Garneau went on to win the riding by over 9,000 votes.

=== Member of 40th Parliament ===
Garneau was a member of the Industry, Science and Technology committee of the 40th Parliament. He also served on the Canada-Japan interparliamentary group.

=== 41st Parliament and leadership campaign ===
Garneau was narrowly re-elected in the 2011 election where he beat New Democratic Party candidate Joanne Corbeil. He was Liberal House leader and served from 2013 as Liberal foreign affairs critic. He was a candidate for interim leadership of the Liberal Party, but was ultimately defeated by Bob Rae. Garneau announced later that year that he was considering a bid for the permanent leadership of the party. In the summer of 2012, he announced that he was looking for a "dream team" to run his leadership bid and that he would only run if he could find the right people.

On November 21, 2012, Garneau was named his party's natural resources critic after David McGuinty resigned the post.

On November 28, 2012, Garneau announced his bid for the leadership of the Liberal Party, placing a heavy focus on the economy. While fellow leadership candidate Justin Trudeau was widely seen as the front-runner in the race, Garneau was thought to be his main challenger among the candidates. With his entrance into the leadership race he resigned his post as Liberal House leader, while remaining the party's critic for natural resources.

At the press conference announcing his candidacy Garneau ruled out any form of co-operation with the Green Party or New Democratic Party to help defeat the Conservative Party in the next election, which was proposed by leadership candidate Joyce Murray.

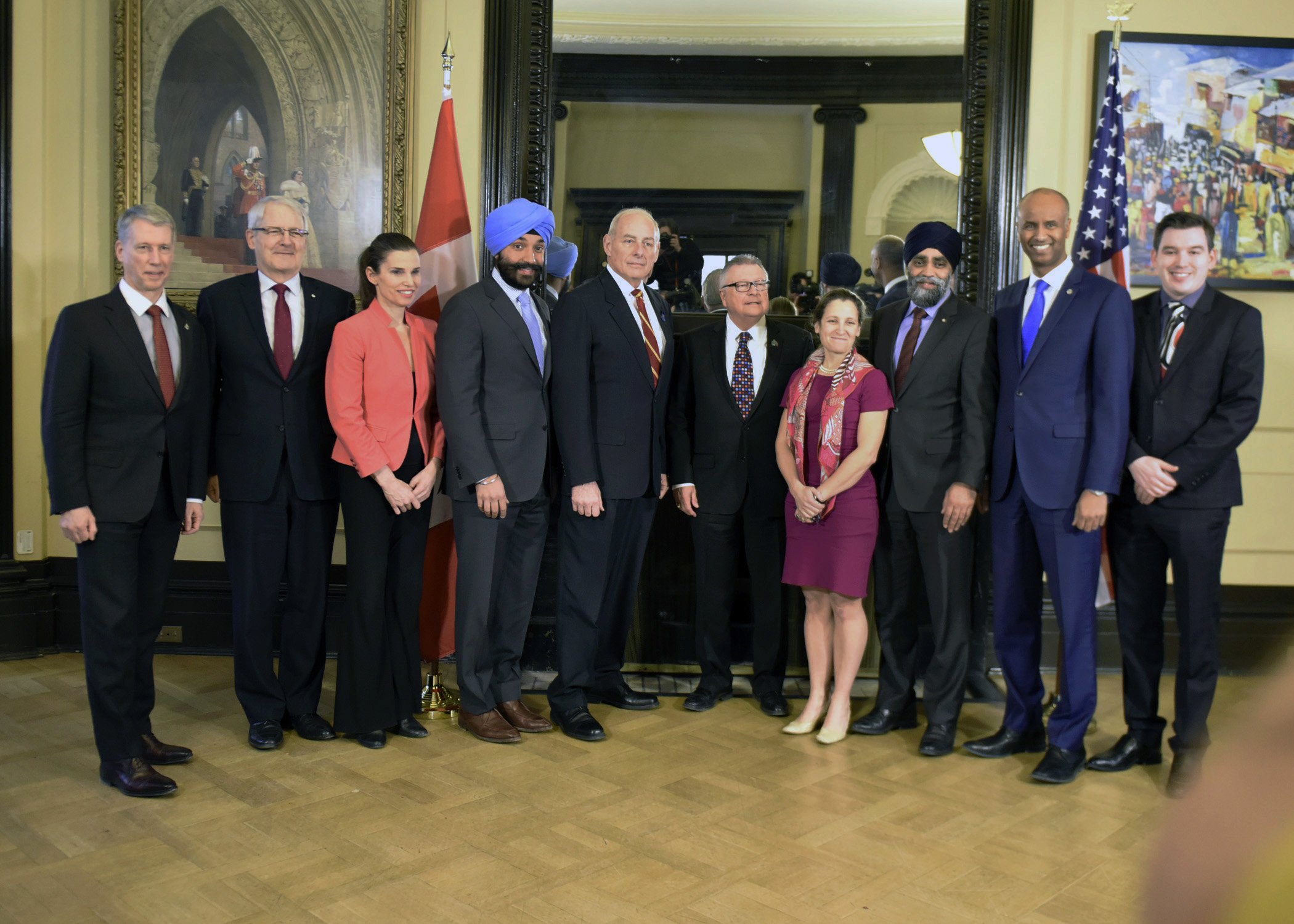
Garneau (2nd from left) and other members of Trudeau's cabinet welcoming U.S. Secretary of Homeland Security John F. Kelly in March 2017

On January 30, 2013, Garneau was replaced as natural resources critic by Ted Hsu. Garneau had been serving in the position on an interim basis. On March 13, 2013, Garneau announced his withdrawal from the race, and threw his support to front-runner Justin Trudeau. On September 18, 2013, Garneau was named co-chair of the Liberal International Affairs Council of Advisors, providing advice on foreign and defence issues to Liberal Party of Canada leader Justin Trudeau.

=== Minister of Transport in the 42nd Parliament ===
In the 2015 elections held on October 19, 2015, Garneau was re-elected as MP in the newly created riding of Notre-Dame-de-Grâce—Westmount. Two weeks later, on November 4, 2015, Garneau was appointed the minister of transport by Prime Minister Justin Trudeau. In May 2017, Garneau introduced an airline passenger bill of rights to standardize how passengers can be treated by airlines which operate any flights in and out of Canada. The legislation would create minimum compensation rates for overbooking, lost or damaged luggage, and bumping passengers off flights. It would also prohibit airlines from removing people from the flight if they have purchased a ticket and set the standard for tarmac delays and airline treatment of passengers when flights are delayed or cancelled over events in the airline's control, or because of weather conditions.

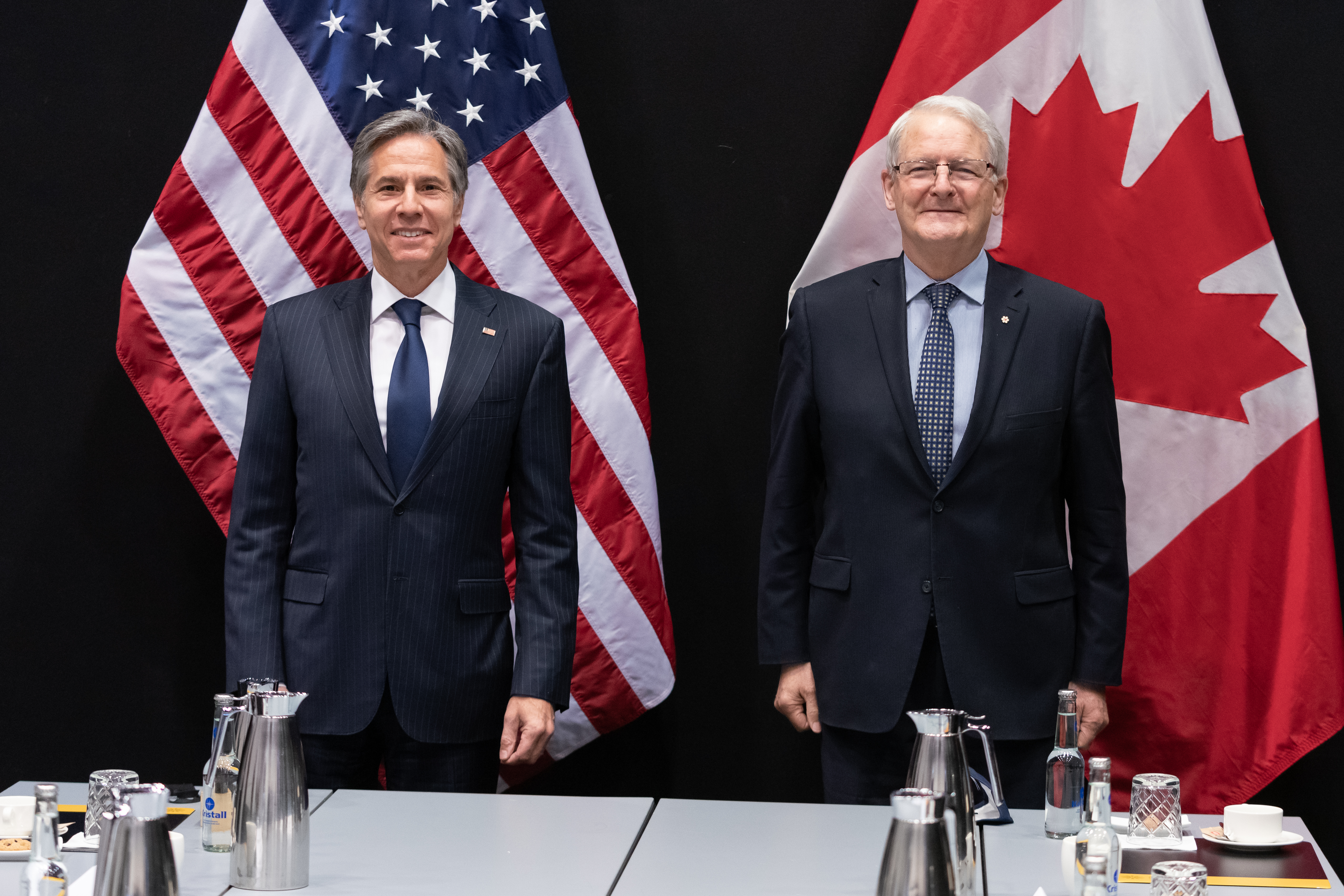
Garneau meets with U.S. Secretary of State Antony Blinken in Reykjavík in May 2021

In March 2019, after days of initial refusal to take actions following the crash of Ethiopian Airlines Flight 302, Garneau who had even gone so far as to say on March 11 that he would board a 737 MAX 8 "without hesitation" as an apparent show of support for the Boeing Company, finally agreed on March 13 to ground and prohibit all Boeing 737 MAX aircraft from flying in Canadian airspace. The Trump administration followed suit later that day. This stood in contrast to the ministry's previous stance, where Garneau insisted the plane was safe to fly, thus making Canada one of the only two nations still flying a substantial number of Boeing 737 MAX planes at the time.

=== Minister of Foreign Affairs in the 43rd Parliament ===
Garneau continued to serve as Minister of Transport after the elections to the 43rd Parliament held in October 2019. He was at Transport for the first two years of the COVID-19 pandemic, and thus he was responsible to enforce the Quarantine Act as lieutenant to the Minister of Health Patty Hajdu; during this time he made many decisions that would affect the lives of travellers in co-ordination with Hadju.

Garneau then served as Minister of Foreign Affairs from January 12, 2021, until October 26, 2021. On January 12, 2021, following the resignation of Navdeep Bains as minister of innovation, science and industry, Prime Minister Justin Trudeau shuffled the Cabinet, with Garneau becoming Minister of Foreign Affairs and Omar Alghabra taking his place at Transport. Garneau was described as one of the most qualified and capable members of Cabinet.

=== 44th Parliament ===
Following the cabinet shuffle stemming from the election in October 2021, Garneau was dropped from Cabinet on October 26, despite being re-elected to his seat in the House. Some speculated that Garneau did not remain in cabinet due to his age, being sacrificed in the name of gender parity, and that he reportedly refused to be subservient to the Prime Minister's Office.

On March 8, 2023, Garneau announced that he would resign his seat and retire from politics. He gave his farewell speech in the House of Commons the same day. The by-election to replace him in parliament occurred June 19, 2023. Liberal Anna Gainey succeeded him, with almost as big a majority of votes as Garneau had won previously.

== Retirement and death ==
In retirement, Garneau continued to advocate for the advantages of human spaceflight in building space infrastructure for monitoring the planet and for communications. In autumn 2024, Garneau's autobiography, A Most Extraordinary Ride: Space, Politics and the Pursuit of a Canadian Dream was published in Canada.

Early in 2025, Garneau was diagnosed with both lymphoma and leukemia. In the final weeks of his life, he was a patient at McGill University Health Centre's Glen Site, in Montreal. His family announced he died from cancer in Montreal on June 4, 2025, at the age of 76. After the announcement, members of the Canadian House of Commons stood for a moment of silence to remember their recent colleague. His first wife and mother to two of his children, Jacqueline Brown, predeceased him by suicide in 1987, shortly after the couple separated. He is survived by his second wife, Pam Garneau, and four children, Yves, Simone, George, and Adrien.

== Awards and honours ==
Ribbon	Description	Notes
	Canadian Forces' Decoration (CD)	
	Companion of the Order of Canada (C.C.)	Awarded on: May 8, 2003; Invested on: December 12, 2003
	Officer of the Order of Canada (O.C.)	Awarded on: December 17, 1984; Invested on: April 10, 1985
	125th Anniversary of the Confederation of Canada Medal	1993; As an officer of the Order of Canada, he also received the 125th Anniversary of the Confederation of Canada Medal.
	Queen Elizabeth II Golden Jubilee Medal for Canada	2002; As an officer of the Order of Canada, he also received the Queen Elizabeth II Golden Jubilee Medal of Canada Medal.; Canadian version
	Queen Elizabeth II Diamond Jubilee Medal for Canada	2012; * As a Companion of the Order of Canada, and an elected Member of Parliament he also received the Queen Elizabeth II Diamond Jubilee Medal.; Canadian version

Garneau was appointed an Officer of the Order of Canada in 1984 in recognition of his role as the first Canadian astronaut. He was promoted the rank of Companion within the order in 2003 for his extensive work with Canada's space program.

He is honoured with two high schools named after him, Marc Garneau Collegiate Institute in Toronto and École secondaire publique Marc-Garneau in Trenton, Ontario.

Garneau was the Honorary Captain of the Royal Canadian Sea Cadets. In addition, n^{o} 599 Royal Canadian Air Cadets squadron is named in his honour.

Garneau was awarded the Key to the City of Ottawa from Marion Dewar the Mayor of Ottawa on December 10, 1984.

He was inducted into the International Space Hall of Fame in 1992.

== Honorary degrees ==
Location	Date	School	Degree
Ontario	May 17, 1985	Royal Military College of Canada	Doctor of Military Science (DMSc)
Nova Scotia	1985	Technical University of Nova Scotia	Doctor of Engineering (D.Eng)
Quebec	1985	Laval University	
Quebec	1990	Royal Military College Saint-Jean	
Ontario	1997	University of Ottawa	Doctor of the University (D.Univ)
Alberta	Spring 2001	University of Lethbridge	Doctor of Science (D.Sc.)
Ontario	Spring 2002	York University	Doctor of Science (D.Sc.)
Quebec	December 2004	Concordia University	Doctor of Laws (LL.D)
Ontario	November 2005	McMaster University	Doctor of Science (D.Sc.)
Alberta	2006	Athabasca University	Doctor of Science (D.Sc.)
British Columbia	2006	British Columbia Institute of Technology	Doctor of Technology (D.Tech.)

== Electoral record ==
2021 Canadian federal election: Notre-Dame-de-Grâce—Westmount
Party	Candidate	Votes	%	±%	Expenditures
Liberal	Marc Garneau	24,510	53.76	−2.52	$61,675.31
New Democratic	Emma Elbourne-Weinstock	8,753	19.20	+3.79	$23,238.48
Conservative	Mathew Kaminski	6,412	14.06	+2.62	$777.38
Bloc Québécois	Jordan Craig Larouche	2,407	5.28	+0.59	$2,242.01
Green	Sam Fairbrother	1,835	4.02	−6.70	$5,916.70
People's	David Freiheit	1,498	3.29	+2.16	$17,259.62
Marxist–Leninist	Rachel Hoffman	117	0.26	+0.12	$0.00
Christian Heritage	Geofryde Wandji	59	0.13	–	$1,300.00
Total valid votes/expense limit		45,591	99.03	–	$108,061.50
Total rejected ballots		446	0.97	+0.09	
Turnout		46,037	62.55	−3.68	
Eligible voters		73,595			
Liberal hold		Swing		−3.16	
Source: Elections Canada

2019 Canadian federal election: Notre-Dame-de-Grâce—Westmount
Party	Candidate	Votes	%	±%	Expenditures
Liberal	Marc Garneau	28,323	56.28	−1.39	$77,287.54
New Democratic	Franklin Gertler	7,753	15.41	−6.35	$45,608.88
Conservative	Neil Drabkin	5,759	11.44	−2.93	none listed
Green	Robert Green	5,397	10.73	+7.67	$9,697.34
Bloc Québécois	Jennifer Jetté	2,359	4.69	+2.21	none listed
People's	André Valiquette	565	1.12	–	$4,895.49
Independent	Jeffery A. Thomas	98	0.19	–	none listed
Marxist–Leninist	Rachel Hoffman	67	0.13	−0.22	$0.00
Total valid votes/expense limit		50,321	99.12		
Total rejected ballots		446	0.88		
Turnout		50,767	66.23		
Eligible voters		76,649			
Liberal hold		Swing		+4.96	
Source: Elections Canada

2015 Canadian federal election: Notre-Dame-de-Grâce—Westmount
Party	Candidate	Votes	%	±%	Expenditures
Liberal	Marc Garneau	29,755	57.67	+19.43	$116,633.55
New Democratic	James Hughes	11,229	21.76	−13.29	$121,985.65
Conservative	Richard Sagala	7,414	14.37	−3.28	$23,826.12
Green	Melissa Kate Wheeler	1,581	3.06	−1.32	$1,243.50
Bloc Québécois	Simon Quesnel	1,282	2.48	−1.59	$2,358.94
Marxist–Leninist	Rachel Hoffman	181	0.35	–	–
Independent	Lisa Julie Cahn	151	0.29	–	–
Total valid votes/Expense limit		51,593	100.00	–	$214,383.86
Total rejected ballots		311	0.60	–	–
Turnout		51,904	65.21	–	–
Eligible voters		79,597	–	–	–
Source: Elections Canada

2011 Canadian federal election: Westmount—Ville-Marie
Party	Candidate	Votes	%	±%	Expenditures
Liberal	Marc Garneau	15,346	37.18	−9.29	–
New Democratic	Joanne Corbeil	14,704	35.62	+12.69	–
Conservative	Neil Drabkin	7,218	17.49	+1.68	–
Bloc Québécois	Véronique Roy	2,278	5.52	−1.74	–
Green	Andrew Carkner	1,516	3.67	−3.37	–
Rhinoceros	Victoria Haliburton	140	0.34	+0.18	–
Communist	Bill Sloan	73	0.18	+0.09	–
Total valid votes/expense limit		41,275	99.60		–
Total rejected ballots		165	0.40	−0.18	
Turnout		41,440	53.36	+2.72	
Electors on the lists		77,656			
Liberal hold		Swing		−10.99	

2008 Canadian federal election: Westmount—Ville-Marie
Party	Candidate	Votes	%	±%	Expenditures
Liberal	Marc Garneau	18,041	46.47	+0.79	$78,009
New Democratic	Anne Lagacé Dowson	8,904	22.93	+7.56	$79,186
Conservative	Guy Dufort	6,139	15.81	−1.84	$34,968
Bloc Québécois	Charles Larivée	2,818	7.26	−5.30	$8,281
Green	Claude William Genest	2,733	7.04	−1.31	–
Rhinoceros	Judith Vienneau	62	0.16	–	–
Marxist–Leninist	Linda Sullivan	49	0.13	−0.10	–
Independent	David Rovins	47	0.12	–	$30
Communist	Bill Sloan	34	0.09	−0.08	$2,433
Total valid votes/expense limit		38,827	99.43		$83,153
Total rejected ballots		224	0.57	−0.06	
Turnout		39,051	50.64	−3.05	
Eligible voters		77,112			
Liberal hold		Swing		−3.39	

2006 Canadian federal election: Vaudreuil—Soulanges
Party	Candidate	Votes	%	±%	Expenditures
Bloc Québécois	Meili Faille	27,012	43.16	−1.13	$85,133
Liberal	Marc Garneau	17,768	28.39	−10.41	$79,413
Conservative	Stephane Bourgon	11,889	19.00	+10.81	$35,090
New Democratic	Bert Markgraf	3,468	5.54	+1.64	$3,385
Green	Pierre Pariseau-Legault	2,450	3.91	+0.14	$1,144
Total valid votes/Expense limit		62,587	100.00	$85,543	
Bloc Québécois hold		Swing		+9.28	

== See also ==
- List of Canadian university leaders

== Sources ==
- Garneau, Marc (2024a). A Most Extraordinary Ride: Space, Politics and the Pursuit of a Canadian Dream. Toronto: Signal/McClelland & Stewart. ISBN 9780771016219.

Academic offices
Preceded by Ray Hnatyshyn	Chancellor of Carleton University; 2003–2008	Succeeded by Herb Gray
Party political offices
Preceded by ???	Caucus Chair of the Liberal Party in Quebec; 2008	Succeeded by Pablo Rodriguez
Preceded by Denis Coderre	Quebec Lieutenant of the Liberal Party; 2008–2011	Succeeded by Vacant, then Pablo Rodriguez
29th Canadian Ministry (2015–2025) – Cabinet of Justin Trudeau
Cabinet posts (2)
Predecessor	Office	Successor
François-Philippe Champagne	Minister of Foreign Affairs; January 12, 2021 – October 26, 2021	Mélanie Joly
Lisa Raitt	Minister of Transport; November 4, 2015 – January 12, 2021	Omar Alghabra
