= Michael J. Bloomfield =

American astronaut (born 1959)

Michael Bloomfield
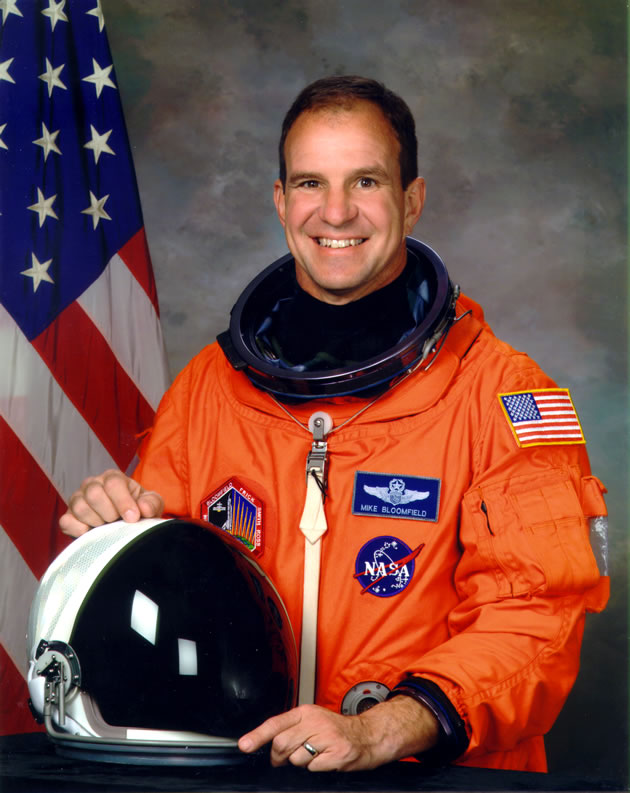
- Born: Michael John Bloomfield; March 16, 1959 (age 67); Flint, Michigan, U.S.
- Other name: Bloomer
- Education: United States Air Force Academy (BS); Old Dominion University (MS)
- Space career

NASA astronaut
- Rank: Colonel, USAF
- Time in space: 32d 11h 2m
- Selection: NASA Group 15 (1994)
- Missions: STS-86; STS-97; STS-110
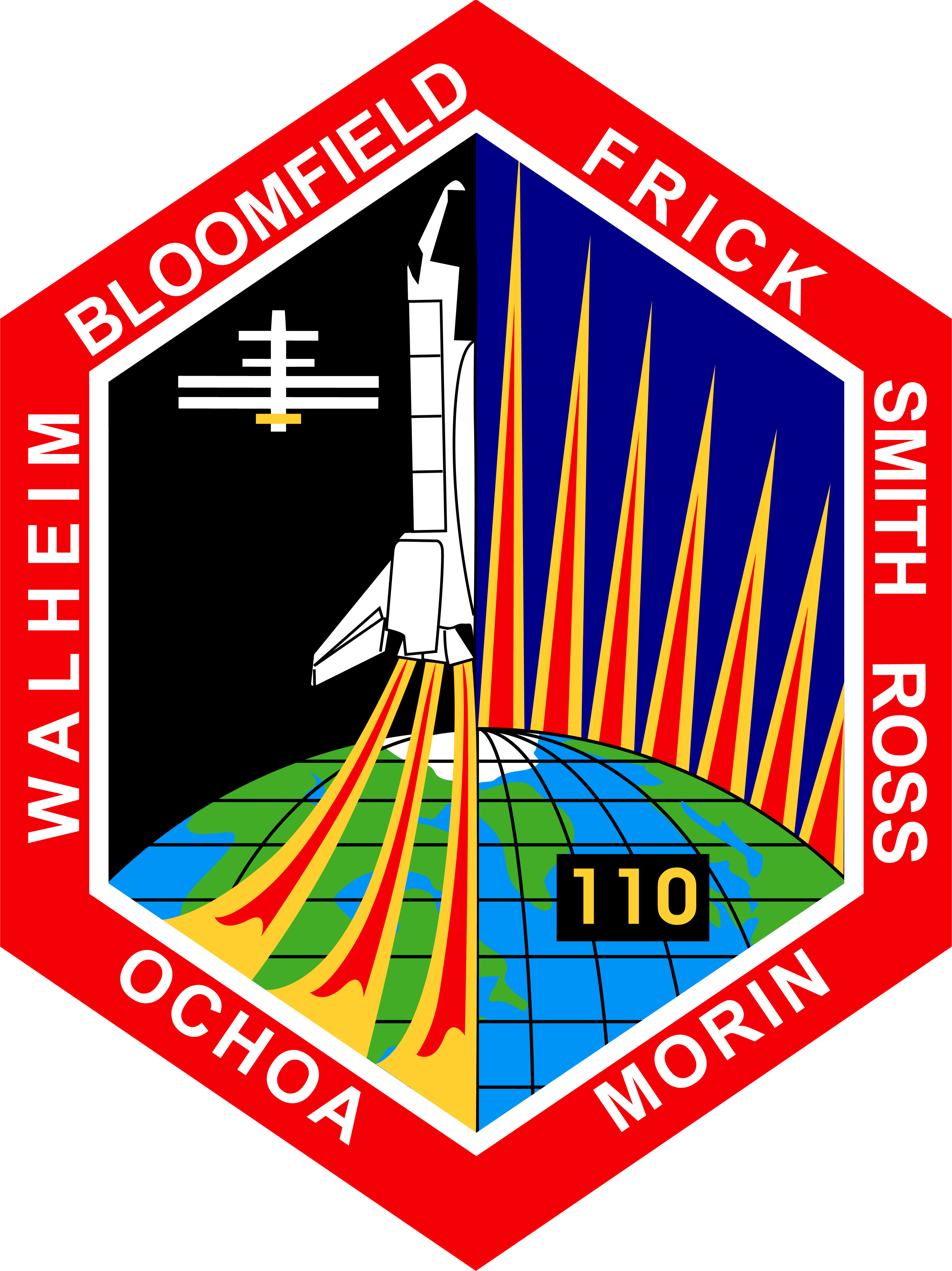
- Mission insignia

Michael John "Bloomer" Bloomfield (born March 16, 1959) is an American former astronaut and a veteran of three Space Shuttle missions.

== Early life and education ==
Born in Flint and raised in Lake Fenton, Michigan, Bloomfield received his bachelor's degree in Engineering Mechanics from the United States Air Force Academy, where he played Falcons football for coach Bill Parcells and was the team's captain. He became an F-15 fighter pilot with the rare combination of having graduated the Fighter Weapons Instructor Course (FWIC, pronounced 'Fwick') and then selected as a test pilot (assigned to the F-16 test squadron at Edwards AFB). He earned his master's degree in Engineering Management from Old Dominion University in 1993.

== NASA career ==
Selected by NASA in December 1994, Bloomfield reported to the Johnson Space Center in March 1995. He worked as Chief of Safety for the Astronaut Office, Chief Instructor Astronaut, Director of Shuttle Operations, and Chief of the Shuttle Branch, which oversees all Shuttle technical issues for the Astronaut Office.

He first flew as a pilot aboard STS-86 in 1997, where he docked with the space station Mir. Bloomfield also piloted STS-97 in 2000 and commanded STS-110 in 2002, both missions to the International Space Station.

In 2006, Bloomfield served as deputy director of Flight Crew Operations at NASA's Johnson Space Center in Houston, Texas. He resigned from NASA in July 2007.

== Post-NASA career ==
In October 2007, Bloomfield joined ATK as Vice President of the Constellation Program. In December 2010, Bloomfiel joined Oceaneering as its vice president and General Manager of Oceaneering Space Systems.

He currently serves on the board of directors at Space Center Houston and resides in suburban Houston, Texas.
