= David Freiheit =

Montreal lawyer turned YouTuber (born 1979)

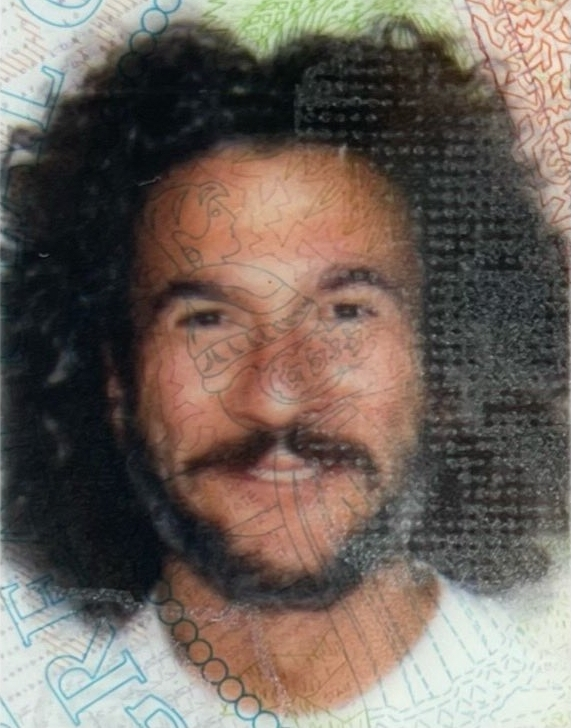
- Freiheit's 2022 Florida Driver's License photo
- Born: David Freiheit; May 23, 1979 (age 46)
- Other names: Viva Frei
- Education: Dawson College; McGill University (BA); Université Laval
- Occupations: YouTuber, commercial litigator

YouTube information
- Channels: Viva Frei; Viva Family; Viva CLIPS!
- Years active: 2012–present
- Genres: Law; Vlog; Politics
- Subscribers: 642,000
- Views: 172 million
- Last updated: March 27, 2025
- Website: vivafrei.com

Rumble information
- Channels: vivafrei
- Years active: 2015–present
- Subscribers: 457,000

David Freiheit (born May 23, 1979), is a Canadian lawyer, former political candidate for the People's Party of Canada and YouTuber under the pseudonym Viva Frei.

== Biography ==
Freiheit grew up in Montreal, Quebec, as the youngest of five siblings born in a Jewish family. He enjoyed creating videos. He studied Creative Arts at Dawson College and received his Bachelor of Arts at McGill University. He then received his civil law degree from Université Laval where he was the editor-in-chief of the university's law journal.

In 2007, Freiheit began practising law, following in the footsteps of his father and older siblings. He worked professionally for the prominent commercial litigation firm Borden Ladner Gervais for six years, but left to be a freelance litigator after his first child to have a more favourable work-life balance, starting a firm called Freiheit Legal.

For the first few years of his YouTube career, Freiheit was a practising commercial litigator, and he struggled to find time to create his videos. In January 2018, he discontinued his litigation practice and turned full-time to YouTube.

On July 22, 2021, Freiheit announced the launch of his campaign to run for Parliament as a member of the People's Party of Canada.

== YouTube career ==
=== Early content and awards (2014–2019) ===
Freiheit started his YouTube career in early 2014 by posting videos of him lip syncing to various pop songs while running obstacle courses dressed in a full suit. These videos were not receiving many views, so Freiheit decided to try another style; in late 2014, Freiheit started posting nature-related stunts. He gained popularity when he posted a video of a squirrel picking up his GoPro action camera and carrying it up a tree. Freiheit then started posting videos of stunts involving the use of a drone.

In 2016, Freiheit won a GoPro Award for his use of their cameras in his videos. He won a Shorty Social Good Award for Best Overall YouTube Presence in 2017.

In January 2019, Freiheit was invited by GoPro to be a featured panellist at the Consumer Electronics Show at the Las Vegas Convention Center in Las Vegas, Nevada.

=== Style change (2019–present) ===
From 2014 to 2019, Freiheit had accumulated around 60,000 subscribers. In April 2019, he decided that since law-related content was by far his channel's most popular genre, he would change the style of his channel and only post vlogs analysing different current issues from a legal standpoint. He started a second channel, "Viva Family", as a place to maintain his former content style.

Before running for the PPC, Freiheit had classified the political stance he takes on his channel as non-partisan, claiming that the internet, through the use of the terms right-wing or left-wing, only succeeds in "pigeonholing, categorizing, dichotomizing, just reducing a complex individual to either right or left in all of their... beliefs". In an interview, he described his channel's content as including a "pretty decent balance of left and right".

In 2019 attorney Robert Barnes began making live weekly Sunday evening appearances on Freiheit's channel. The series continued on a weekly basis, often featuring a notable guest, where the two discuss recent legal and political event.

In September 2022, Freiheit signed an exclusive video deal with the video platform Rumble. He frequently works in person at the Rumble Miami studio, and was attributed by the company as a key legal contributor to their 2022 proposal for an 'open-source content moderation policy and process'.

== Political career ==
Freiheit ran in the 2021 Canadian federal election to become a Member of Parliament for the People's Party of Canada in the riding of Notre-Dame-de-Grâce—Westmount. In July 2021, Freiheit created a third channel, "Viva PPC", as a place to feature his political content. He lost his electoral bid, coming in sixth place in the riding with 3.3% of votes.

=== Electoral record ===
2021 Canadian federal election: Notre-Dame-de-Grâce—Westmount
Party	Candidate	Votes	%	±%	Expenditures
Liberal	Marc Garneau	24,510	53.76	−2.52	$61,675.31
New Democratic	Emma Elbourne-Weinstock	8,753	19.20	+3.79	$23,238.48
Conservative	Mathew Kaminski	6,412	14.06	+2.62	$777.38
Bloc Québécois	Jordan Craig Larouche	2,407	5.28	+0.59	$2,242.01
Green	Sam Fairbrother	1,835	4.02	−6.70	$5,916.70
People's	David Freiheit	1,498	3.29	+2.16	$17,259.62
Marxist–Leninist	Rachel Hoffman	117	0.26	+0.12	$0.00
Christian Heritage	Geofryde Wandji	59	0.13	–	$1,300.00
Total valid votes/expense limit		45,591	99.03	–	$108,061.50
Total rejected ballots		446	0.97	+0.09	
Turnout		46,037	62.55	−3.68	
Eligible voters		73,595			
Liberal hold		Swing		−3.16	
Source: Elections Canada
