= History of the Green Party of Canada =

Logo since 2025

The Green Party of Canada was founded at a conference held at Carleton University in Ottawa in 1983.

== 1970s ==
By the 1970s, British-born Trevor Hancock was living in Canada and "was looking for something that was proliferating across Europe but hadn't seemed to land yet in Canada: An ecological political party." In 1979 he published an article entitled Tomorrow's political party, and "before long, Hancock found himself with the phone numbers of dozens of Canadians interested in advancing environmentalism through politics." Therefore, "The federal Green party started... with a paper in a journal and an address book full of phone numbers."

== 1980s and 1990s ==
=== Founding ===
In June 1983, the Green Party of Canada was registered by Paul George, Ted Mousseau, William Marshall, Ed McDonough and Seymour Trieger. Immediately afterwards, Betty Nickerson was able to run as a Green Party of Canada candidate in a byelection in British Columbia's federal district Mission—Port Moody. The party had not gained official status at that point so the party name did not appear on the ballot, though it did on all of Nickerson's communications.

In fall 1983, in Carleton University, Ontario, the first convention of the Canadian Greens elected the next set of party officers. Trevor Hancock was the party's first registered leader. Close to 200 people from 55 communities attended, coming from every province except Newfoundland and Labrador and Prince Edward Island.

The birthing process was difficult, with deep divisions between those arguing for a national structure, and those in favour of a process that would build from the regions following the bioregional democracy structure. Party members chose a radically decentralized party structure, and for several years a kind of green anarchism prevailed. Eventually, an uneasy agreement was reached for a federation of regional parties, with strong support for building upwards from the bottom. The question arose: "Is the priority to redefine politics from the ground up, or to play the electoral game according to the present rules? Or both?" Many members saw the party as a way to protest Canada's political system, and not much more:

From the first Green party convention, Hancock said, there was a divide in the party between... fundamentalists who wanted to advance the purest version of manifestos like the "Blueprint" and realists who wanted to influence politics as much as possible through official channels like getting elected.

=== 1984 election ===
The party ran 60 candidates in the 1984 Canadian federal election. Approximately 27,000 Canadians voted Green (0.2% of the votes cast). But ongoing discussions about the party's modus operandi became so exhausting that, at one point in the mid-1980s, there was a near collapse of the party. It survived — though was not particularly active — for almost a decade under the stewardship of the BC Greens.

=== 1988 election and aftermath ===
In the 1988 federal election, Greens concentrated on Quebec, where le Parti Vert (not the same as the current Parti Vert du Québec) ran 29 candidates, up from just 4 in the previous election. Les Verts received higher results than Green candidates anywhere else in Canada, polling an average of 2.4% of the vote. The Quebec wing hosted the 1990 Canadian Greens conference in Montreal. But soon after that, Canada's constitutional problems interfered, and many Quebec candidates abandoned the Greens in favour of a Quebec sovereigntist party, the Bloc Québécois. There were only six Green candidates from Quebec in the 1993 election.

In the summer of 1988, the BC Greens, under the de facto leadership of electoral-reform activist Steve Kisby, tried to get the Green Party of Canada onto its feet by hosting a conference — the first federal gathering since the founding meeting in 1983. The main accomplishment of that conference was the acceptance, after five years as a registered party, of a constitution. The party continued to field candidates at the federal level, and provincial parties were organized in a few other provinces, led by consistently strong efforts in British Columbia.

In 1988, however, despite minimal on-the-ground organization, Quebec produced the lion's share of Green candidates and votes thanks to the efforts of Quebec organizer and candidate Rolf Bramann. A year later, the provincial Greens in Quebec scored 2% of the popular vote, averaging 5% in the constituencies in which they ran under the leadership of Jean Ouimet. Montreal's municipal Ecology Party also scored very well in elections in this period under the leadership of publisher Dimitrios Roussopoulos.

Ouimet, a strong sovereigntist, maintained a party wholly independent of the federal Greens during his leadership; as a result Bramann created an organization called the Green Party of Canada in Quebec, a predominantly Anglophone entity that nominated federal candidates only. There was open antipathy between Ouimet and Bramann. Neither was affiliated with Écologie-Montreal.

At the same time as the Parti Vert began to collapse due to Ouimet's defection to the PQ in 1992, Bramann was removed from his position in the federal party due to anti-Semitic comments he and some of his candidates had made. This led to a precipitous decline in all Green Party organizations in Quebec despite a very promising start a mere four years previous.

From 1988 onwards, a pattern developed whereby the federal party tended to function alternately as an appendage of the BC and Ontario provincial parties. Lacking sufficient funding and an administrative base of its own, control of the federal Greens was sometimes a prize (when the provincial affiliate and its leader wanted to demonstrate its success), and at others, a burden (when the provincial affiliate was forced to invest significant volunteer energy or money for its maintenance) for the Greens in BC and Ontario. Successful candidates for the positions of Leader and Chief Financial Officer were typically personal associates of either the BC or Ontario party's de facto or de jure leader, for whom the leader publicly mobilized and delivered votes.

=== Mid-1990s ===
In the spring of 1996, although the hopes of electing a representative to the BC legislature proved premature, Andy Shadrack in the interior of the province received over 11% of the vote. Overall, the party's proportion of the popular vote surged to a new high. Shadrack was also the most popular Green candidate in the 1997 federal election, scoring over 6% of the popular vote in West Kootenay-Okanagan.

At the party's sixth annual gathering in Castlegar, British Columbia, hosted by Shadrack's riding association, in August 1996, a complete overhaul of the party's constitution was made, spearheaded by Stuart Parker, leader of the provincial Greens in BC. The party's new constitutional framework both democratized and centralized the party which had been previously hobbled by an unworkably decentralized structure. These changes also ended de jure (it had ended de facto some three years earlier) the constitutional prohibition against the party's registered leader acting as its spokesperson or representative. Policy was also agreed to in a wide variety of areas. An important step forward was the structuring of a Shadow Cabinet, whose mandate was to create a platform for the next election in 1997.

The Castlegar gathering marked the beginning of a new era in Canadian Green history, and a somewhat uneasy one at that. In spite of a concern about the nature of leadership in a decentralized party, the Greens' first leadership campaign had been underway for the previous six months. Four candidates contested the leadership. A mail-in ballot was held: Wendy Priesnitz (from Ontario) beat Don Francis (Quebec), Jason Crummey (Newfoundland and Labrador), and Harry Garfinkle (Alberta) to become the Registered Leader of the Green Party of Canada.

In January 1997, although initially recruited by Ontario Green Party leader Frank de Jong, Wendy Priesnitz resigned over what she characterized as domination of the party by an "old boys' network" comprising the BC and Ontario provincial leaders and their male-dominated circles of organizers and advisors. Harry Garfinkle stepped in to be the interim Registered Leader of the Green Party of Canada, and a leadership convention by mail-in ballot was held.

== Joan Russow ==
British Columbia's Joan Russow became leader of the Green Party of Canada on April 13, 1997. Russow won 52% of the ballots cast in the 1997 leadership race, surpassing Ontario's Jim Harris (39%) and Rachelle Small (8%). Immediately upon attaining the leadership, Russow was plunged into a federal general election. Russow's campaign in 1997 set a number of important precedents. The 1997 election was the first campaign in which the Greens conducted a national leader's tour, presented a national platform and a bilingual campaign (Russow is trilingual, speaking Spanish, French and English). Previous campaigns, due in part to the party's few resources and, in part, to the party's constitutional straitjacket, had been characterized by policy and spokespeople operating, at best, province-by-province and, at worst, riding-by-riding. In her own riding of Victoria, Russow received just shy of 3000 votes and 6% of the popular vote.

In the 2000 election, the party nominated 111 candidates, in nine out of ten provinces — all but Newfoundland and Labrador — and in one of three territories (Nunavut). These candidates collected 0.81% of the total popular vote.

Candidates were not run in Newfoundland and Labrador, as a result of ongoing divisions over Joan Russow's refusal to endorse the Green candidate in an earlier St. John's West by-election. (The candidate in question supported the seal hunt and mining development, as most locals did.) This caused much uncertainty and friction between Newfoundland's Terra Nova Green Party Association and the Green Party leader as the party gradually adapted to the realities of functioning as a true national party rather than a disorganized federation of local activists.

In the 2001 Quebec City protest against the Free Trade Area of the Americas, Russow was the first person incarcerated in a jail built specially for protesters, for taking a photograph of it from outside. Russow promoted the Green Party as a leader in the anti-globalization movement, in particular the anti-corporatist and pro-peace movement, but felt undermined when the German Greens supported the bombing of Belgrade. As other members of her party had supported military intervention, Russow's leadership was called into question. She stepped down as party leader in 2001 and left the party to join the New Democratic Party (NDP). Because the NDP's federal and provincial wings are integrated, this also entailed joining the New Democratic Party of British Columbia.

Another factor in her resignation may have been ongoing conflicts within the party provincially and municipally in her home city of Victoria, where she had switched allegiance from the Parker faction to the Adriane Carr faction. Her late conversion left her on unsure footing with the powerful new provincial leader and in public conflict with City Councilor Art Vanden Berg and other members of the Parker-affiliated team that had backed her leadership during the 1997 and 1998 leadership contests.

The conflicts left Russow isolated and alienated from most members of the party. Volunteer efforts were substantially absorbed in provincial campaigns between 2001 and 2003, and the federal party became dormant between elections, as was typical in the past. Chris Bradshaw served the party as interim leader from 2001 to February 2003.

== Jim Harris ==
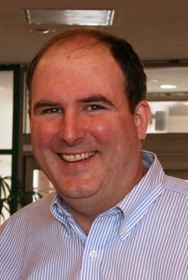
Jim Harris, leader from 2003 to 2006

In February 2003, Jim Harris, in his second bid for the leadership, defeated John Grogan of Valemount, British Columbia, and Jason Crummey. Crummey was originally from Newfoundland and involved with Newfoundland and Labrador Terra Nova Greens. Harris, an author and public speaker, and GPC member since 1987 (though not active in several previous elections), had the support of all provincial Green Party leaders, breaking 15 years of precedent of the BC leader backing a BC candidate from their own political circle.

Jim Harris was elected to the office with over 80% of the vote and the support of the leaders of all of the provincial level Green parties. He was re-elected on the first ballot by 56% of the membership in a leadership challenge vote in August 2004. Tom Manley placed second with over 30% of the vote. A few months after the 2004 convention, Tom Manley was appointed Deputy Leader. On 23 September 2005, Manley left the party to join the Liberal Party of Canada.

His election was taken by many as reflecting a desire among the members to "become serious" in achieving electoral progress, and to steer away from any explicit anti-political ideas. However, his campaign also included a hard line against Red-Green (i.e., alliances with NDP members and organized labour) coalitions that Russow had supported at the municipal level in Victoria. While adopting the rhetoric of pragmatism, some argue, Harris eschewed the only strategy that has ever elected Greens under the first-past-the-post system.

=== 2004 election preparations ===
The Green Party ran a fundraising campaign in 2003 to realize Harris' goal of running a full slate in the upcoming election. This party also had to borrow hundreds of thousands of dollars against the $1.75/vote expected to accrue to the party after the election. The party began organizing in all provinces with paid staff.

While the organizing and election planning was centralized, policy development was to be decentralized. In February 2004, the Green Party of Canada Living Platform was initiated by the Party's former Head of Platform and Research, Michael Pilling. Using wiki technology, the goal of the Living Platform was to open the party's participatory democracy to the public to help validate its policies against broad public input. It also made it easy for candidates to share their answers to public interest group questionnaires, find the best answers to policy questions, and for even rural and remote users, and Canadians abroad, to contribute to Party policy intelligence. To this end, the Green Party used the Living Platform to develop election platforms for 2004 and 2005, thus making the Green Party of Canada the first political party to use a wiki for such a purpose.

An emphasis on a green tax shift in its 2004 platform, which favoured partially reducing income and corporate taxes (while increasing taxes on polluters and energy consumers), created questions as to whether the Green Party was still on the left of the political spectrum, or was taking a more eco-capitalist approach by reducing progressive taxation in favour of regressive taxation. Green Party policy writers have challenged this interpretation by claiming that any unintended "regressive" tax consequences from the application of a Green Tax Shift would be intentionally offset by changes in individual tax rates and categories as well as an 'eco-tax" refund for those who pay no tax.

=== 2004 election and aftermath ===
In the 2004 election, the party received a significant increase in media coverage on the strength of its 308 candidates, the platform, and a national leaders' tour. The party began to be included in almost all national political polls. Its popular support peaked at 7% during the campaign, and the party finished with 4.3% of the vote. The party's strongest candidate, Andrew Lewis in the riding of Saanich—Gulf Islands, won over 10,000 votes, the first Green Party candidate to do so. Lewis still finished fourth in the riding, however.

In August 2004 at the national convention near Calgary, Alberta, Jim Harris was re-elected, with a reduced majority of only 56%. Rival Tom Manley polled nearly 37%.

Most conference debate centred on significant constitutional reform proposals, and the role of membership in ruling on matters of policy and the constitution. The conference ended with a re-affirmation of a hybrid that was developed during the campaign: a centralized executive with decentralized policy and constitutional development.

Politicians from different political backgrounds have expressed interest in the party. Former Deputy Prime Minister Sheila Copps on March 2, 2005, spoke publicly to a group of Greens in Toronto, advising the party on its electoral strategy. Former Progressive Conservative leadership candidate David Orchard not only attended but met with members of the GPC Council; however, Orchard's involvement with the Greens dates back to the mid-1990s when he worked with Russow on a variety of trade and international issues. (Ontario leader Frank de Jong and BC leader Stuart Parker were featured speakers at pro-Orchard rallies early in his first bid for the Tory leadership in 1998.) It was also rumoured in the media in 2004 that David Anderson, the former Minister of the Environment in Chrétien's government, was considering joining the party. Anderson, however, successfully ran for re-election as a Liberal.

=== 2006 election and aftermath ===
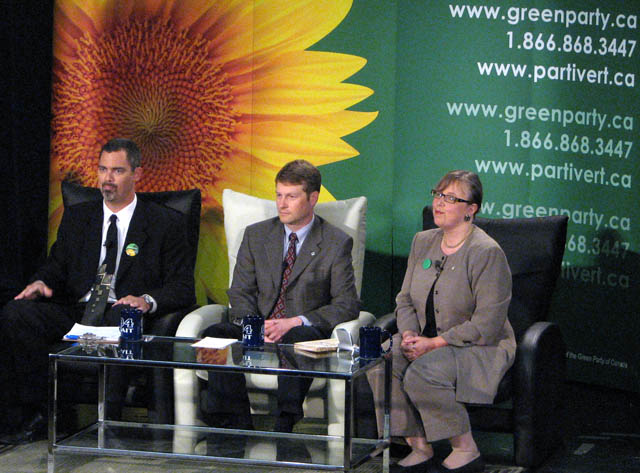
Green Party of Canada leadership convention, 2006

None of the party's candidates were elected, but the party received 4.5% of the vote nationally (up from 4.3% in 2004) and 665,940 votes (an increase of about 80,000 votes from 2004). Its best performance was in Alberta, where it received 6.6%. Sean Maw won 10.84% of the vote in Wild Rose and finished a very distant second to Conservative Myron Thompson. Shane Jolley won 12.9% of the vote in Bruce—Grey—Owen Sound riding, the largest share of the vote won by any of its candidates. In the riding Ottawa Centre, the Green candidate David Chernushenko received 6,766 votes, the largest number of votes of any of the party's candidates. It had been hoped by Greens that the party's deputy leader, Andrew Lewis, would achieve a breakthrough in Saanich—Gulf Islands where he won 16.7% of the vote in the 2004 election and carried 17 of 238 polling divisions, making Lewis the first Green candidate to win even one polling division. However, running again in Saanich—Gulf Islands in 2006 he lost one-third of his 2004 vote share, winning only 9.6% of the ballots cast.

The party's 2006 election campaign was disrupted by allegations made by Matthew Pollesell, the party's former assistant national organizer, that Harris had not filed a proper accounting of money spent during his 2004 leadership campaign, as required by law. Pollesell issued a request that Elections Canada investigate. Pollesell and another former party member, Gretchen Schwarz, were subsequently warned by the party's legal counsel to retract allegations they had made or face a possible legal action. Dana Miller, who served in the party's shadow cabinet with responsibility for human-rights issues, made public her earlier complaints that the party has violated election law and its own constitution and has also asked for an Elections Canada investigation. Miller was expelled from the party after filing a complaint within the party in April.

Harris announced on April 24, 2006, that he would stand down as leader at the party's convention in August.

== Elizabeth May ==
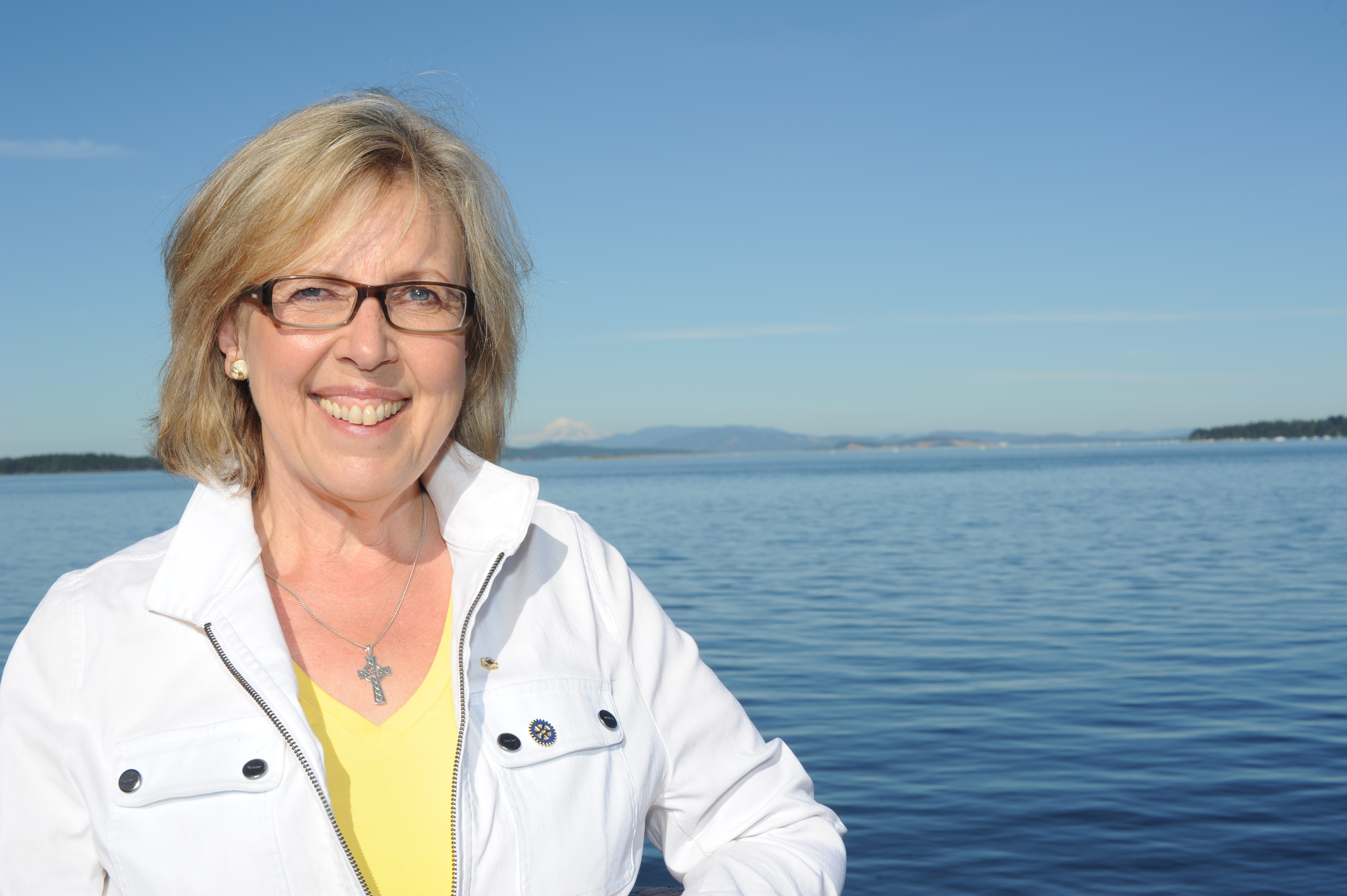
Elizabeth May, July 2014

=== 2006 to 2008 ===
Long-time environmental activist and lawyer Elizabeth May won the leadership of the federal Green party at a convention in Ottawa on 26 August 2006. May won with 2,145 votes, or 65.3 per cent of the valid ballots cast defeating two other candidates. The second-place finisher David Chernushenko, an environmental consultant, owner of Green & Gold Inc. and two time candidate, collected 1,096 votes or 33.3 per cent of the total, while Jim Fannon, real estate agent at Re/Max Garden City Realty, four time candidate and founder of Nature's Hemp finished a distant third, collecting just 29 votes or 0.88 per cent of the vote. ("None of the above" finished last with 13 votes or 0.44 per cent of the final vote.)

On 21 November 2006, May appointed outgoing Green Party of British Columbia leader Adriane Carr and Quebec television host Claude Genest as Deputy Leaders of the Party. David Chernushenko, who ran against Elizabeth May for the party leadership, was the Senior Deputy to the Leader for the first year after May was elected leader.

On 22 October 2006, Elizabeth May announced she would run in the federal by-election to be held on 27 November 2006, in London North Centre, Ontario. She finished second behind the Liberal candidate but garnered 26% of the popular vote.

Even though they had never held a seat yet, Elizabeth May's Green Party began to receive more mainstream media attention on other party policy not directly related to the environment – for example, supporting labour rights and poppy legalization in Afghanistan.

On 30 August 2008, Vancouver area MP Blair Wilson became the first-ever Green Member of Parliament, after sitting for nearly a year of the 39th Canadian Parliament as an Independent. He had been a Liberal MP, but stepped down voluntarily from the caucus earlier in the parliament after anonymous allegations of campaign finance irregularities, most of which he was later cleared after a 9-month investigation by Elections Canada. Wilson had joined the Green Party during Parliament's summer recess and never sat in the House of Commons as a Green MP.

=== 2008 election ===
After initial opposition from three of the four major political parties, May was invited to the leaders' debates. In the 2008 federal election, the party increased its share of the popular vote by 2.33% (to 6.80%), being the only federally funded party to increase its total vote tally over 2006, attracting nearly 280,000 new votes. However, the party failed to elect a candidate. Some prominent Green Party members blamed the public discussion of strategic voting and the media's misrepresentation of May's comments during the election campaign for the failure of some promising candidates to reach Election Canada's 10% reimbursement threshold, as well as reducing the party's federal funding based on popular vote.

==== May-Dion electoral co-operation in 2008 ====
With Stéphane Dion winning the Liberal leadership on a largely environmentalist platform, and both the Liberals and Greens having a shared interest in both defeating the Conservatives, whose environmental policies have come under criticism from members of both parties, some political observers questioned if an alliance of some sort between the two parties might take place.

When Green Party leader Elizabeth May made the announcement that she would run in Central Nova, then held by Conservative cabinet minister Peter MacKay, local Liberals would "neither confirm nor deny" that they had had discussions with May over ways to unseat MacKay. On 21 March, Dion said, "Madame May and I have conversations about how we may work together to be sure that this government will stop to do so much harm to our environment". The speculation was confirmed when Dion and May agreed not to run candidates in each other's ridings.

May earlier attempted to broker a deal with the NDP, by contacting Stephen Lewis to set up a meeting with party leader Jack Layton, who both rejected the notion outright. When the May-Dion deal was announced, it was criticized by the Conservatives and NDP.

Ultimately May failed in her bid to get elected in Central Nova, losing to McKay by 18,240 votes (46.6%) to 12,620 (32.24%) in the 2008 federal election. The New Democratic Party candidate, Louise Lorifice, placed third with 7,659 votes (19.56%).

=== Role in 2008-2009 parliamentary dispute ===
In December 2008, during the 2008–09 Canadian parliamentary dispute, May announced the Green Party would support, from outside parliament, the proposed coalition between the Liberals and the NDP (with the parliamentary support of the Bloc Québécois), which was then attempting to displace the incumbent Conservative government. Liberal leader Stéphane Dion indicated that the Green Party would be given input, but not a veto, over coalition policy and also left open the possibility of May being appointed to the Senate if Dion were to become prime minister. Ultimately, however, the coalition fell apart after Prime Minister Stephen Harper, in order to delay an impending non-confidence vote, advised the Governor General to prorogue parliament. Liberal leader Dion resigned and was replaced by Michael Ignatieff and, when parliament resumed in January 2009, the Liberal Party decided to support the Conservative government's new proposed budget. While parliament was prorogued, Harper also announced his intention to fill all current and upcoming Senate vacancies with Conservative appointees.

=== 2011 election ===
On 11 August 2010, 74% of Green party members voted to hold a leadership review after the next election, instead of in August 2010, which was when May's four-year term as leader was set to end.

On 2 May 2011, Green Party leader Elizabeth May became the first elected Green Party MP to sit in the House of Commons. She won the riding of Saanich—Gulf Islands in coastal British Columbia. In winning her seat, May also became one of the few Greens worldwide to be elected in a federal, single-seat election. On 13 December 2013, Thunder Bay—Superior North MP Bruce Hyer, who had left the New Democratic Party (NDP) in 2012 to sit as an independent after breaking party lines to vote in favour of a repeal of the Long Gun Registry, joined the party, resulting in a record two-member caucus in parliament.

Results of the 2015 Canadian federal election showing support for Green candidates by riding

=== Paul Estrin Affair ===
In August 2014, President elect Paul Estrin published a blog post on the Green Party's website criticizing the actions of Hamas during the 2014 Israel–Gaza conflict. In his article, "Why Gaza Makes Me Sad", Estrin talked about Hamas' "desire to obliterate" the State of Israel and how the terrorist group uses children as human shields. Estrin's blog post was subsequently deleted by the party, with many party seniors and decision makers, including Elizabeth May, distancing themselves from Estrin, with a large majority of the party calling on him to resign. On 5 August, Estrin resigned, criticizing the party for betraying their commitment to values of inclusivity and open public discourse. Elizabeth May accepted the resignation of Estrin, stating that he was not forced to resign but did so of his own volition. May has said that the problem with his statements were the "confusion" they caused because they differed from party lines, but confirmed that Estrin was indeed a "true Green".

=== 2015 election ===
In the federal election on 19 October 2015, May was re-elected in the riding of Saanich—Gulf Islands and was the only Green Party member to win a seat, until 2019. Hyer lost the election to Liberal Party candidate Patty Hajdu in his riding of Thunder Bay-Superior North.

=== 2015 to 2019 ===
In March 2018, May appointed journalist and broadcaster Jo-Ann Roberts as a deputy leader along with environmentalist Daniel Green of Montreal. Roberts ran as Green party candidate in a Victoria, B.C. riding during the 2015 federal election and finished second.

On March 23, 2018, May was arrested while protesting the construction of the Kinder Morgan pipeline on its worksite in defiance of the injunction that allowed the construction to resume, along with New Democrat MP Kennedy Stewart. Both pleaded guilty to contempt of court and paid a fine of $1,500.

On 6 May 2019, Paul Manly became the second MP elected under the party's banner, after winning a by-election in Nanaimo—Ladysmith. On 19 August 2019, a former NDP and briefly Independent MP Pierre Nantel joined the Green Party during the Parliament's summer recess.

=== 2019 election and aftermath ===
During the 2019 federal election, both May and Manly were re-elected while Jenica Atwin was elected in her New Brunswick riding of Fredericton, making her the third elected Green MP in the federal parliament, and the first Green MP outside of British Columbia. Nationwide, the Greens received 1,189,607 votes, representing 6.55% of total valid votes cast.

On 4 November 2019, Green party Leader Elizabeth May announced that effective that day, she would be stepping down as leader of the Party but remaining leader of the Parliamentary caucus, with deputy leader Jo-Ann Roberts assuming an interim leadership role. May would continue to act as Parliamentary Leader and sit as a Green member of Parliament. The decision to step down came as a promise to May's daughter.

== Annamie Paul ==
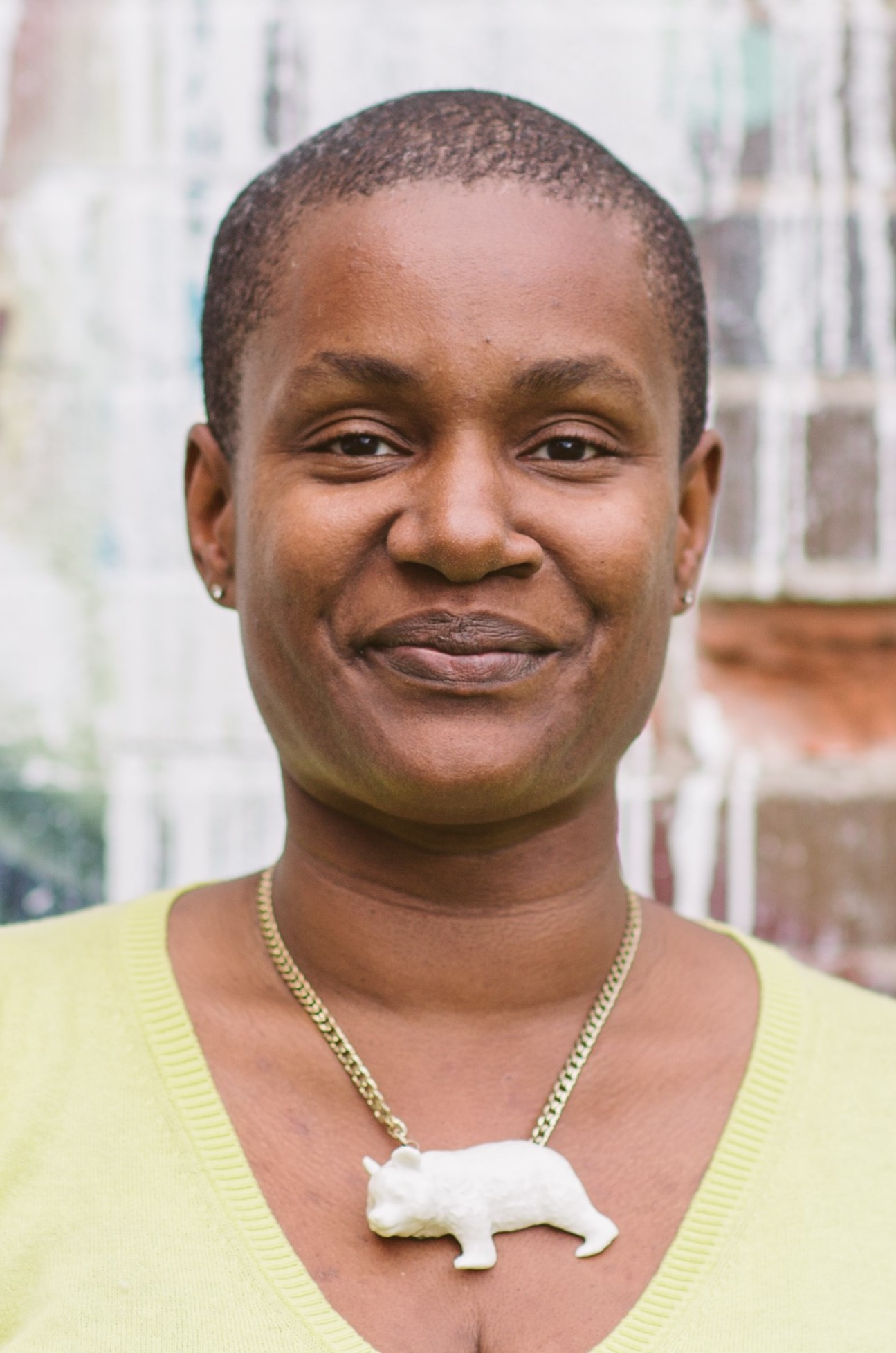
Annamie Paul, leader from 2020 to 2021

=== 2020 to 2021 ===
Ten candidates ran in 2020 Green Party of Canada leadership election to replace Elizabeth May. On October 4, 2020, Toronto lawyer Annamie Paul was declared the winner. She edged out Dimitri Lascasris, a Montreal class-action lawyer running as an ecosocialist, by 2,009 votes (9 percentage points) in the final ballot count. Annamie Paul became the first Black Canadian and first Jewish woman to be elected leader of a major political party in Canada.

Paul ran in the 2020 Toronto Centre federal by-election, where she placed second.

During the 2021 Israel–Palestine crisis, Jenica Atwin criticized Paul's statement on the matter as "inadequate" and called to "end apartheid." Paul's senior advisor Noah Zatzman blasted Atwin and fellow Green MP Paul Manly in a May 14 Facebook post, calling their statements regarding the crisis "Appalling anti-Semitism," and saying "we will work to defeat you." On June 10 Atwin crossed the floor to join the Liberal caucus. This prompted Zatzman to vow to replace Atwin with a "pro-Zionist" candidate. Atwin cited "distractions" in the Green Party as a factor in her departure.

=== 2021 election and aftermath ===
In the 2021 federal election, Mike Morrice, Kitchener Centre became the first elected Green MP ever elected in Ontario, and second Green MP outside of British Columbia. At the same time, Paul Manly lost his seat in Nanaimo—Ladysmith, and the percentage and total voters that the party had been increasing over 12 years declined. A week after the election, Paul announced her intention to begin the process of resigning as leader.

On October 28, 2021, Green members received a leadership review ballot regarding Paul's continued status as leader despite her previous intention to resign, which would have rendered the ballot moot. Paul's protracted departure was due to continued legal conflict between Paul and the Green Party's leadership, with Paul negotiating compensation for legal fees incurred due to arbitration following a previous attempt to remove Paul as leader. Paul officially resigned on November 10, 2021, as voting in the review was ongoing. Her resignation took effect on November 14, 2021, upon its acceptance by the party's federal council.

On November 24, 2021, Amita Kuttner was appointed interim leader. Appointed at the age of 30, Kuttner was the youngest person to lead a federal political party, as well as the first transgender person and person of East Asian heritage.

== Elizabeth May and Jonathan Pedneault ==
On November 19, 2022, Elizabeth May was elected leader of the party once again, and promised to convert the then current leadership model into a co-leadership model, with Jonathan Pedneault being her co-leader. May had run with Pedneault in the leadership race, and Pedneault temporarily served as the deputy leader of the party. After his resignation in 2024, Pedneault returned as co-leader in 2025 following the ratification of the model by Green party members. On August 19, May announced her intention to resign as party leader.

== Mike Morrice ==
Morrice was acclaimed party leader in the 2026 Green Party of Canada leadership election.

== Exclusion from debates ==
In the 2004 election, the consortium of Canadian television networks did not invite Jim Harris to the televised leaders debates. The primary reason given for this was the party's lack of representation in the House of Commons. There were unsuccessful legal actions by the party, a petition by its supporters to have it included, and statements by non-supporters such as Ed Broadbent who believed it should be included. The Green Party was also not included in the leaders' debates for the 2006 election. The same reason was given.

On 8 September 2008, the consortium announced that they would once again exclude the Greens from the French and English debates for the 2008 election. The party had secured a seat in the House at this point (Blair Wilson), satisfying the necessary criteria used in all previous debates dating to at least 1993. While Wilson was not elected as a Green MP, nor had he even sat in the House as one, the situation paralleled that of the Bloc Québécois in 1993. All of the Bloc's members had been elected as either Conservatives or Liberals or, in Gilles Duceppe's case, as an independent, before the group formally registered as a political party. The Bloc was nevertheless included in the 1993 debates.

However, the consortium said that three parties (later identified as the Conservatives, NDP, and one other party) had threatened to boycott the debate if the Green Party was included, and that it had decided it was better to proceed with the four larger parties "in the interest of Canadians". Liberal leader Stéphane Dion supported May's inclusion in the debates but said he would also pull out if Harper withdrew. Bloc leader Gilles Duceppe said that while his party was against the Greens' inclusion, he would attend the debate whether or not they were included. The Green Party said it would sue to force the consortium to allow it to participate. This was not necessary, however, because of the networks' reversal two days later. Many people protested and threatened to boycott Layton and Harper by staging protests, as well as phoning in and e-mailing the networks and the opposing parties, prompting both parties to recant their position.

In the 2011 Canadian federal election, the consortium of broadcasters playing host to the political debates (consisting of CBC, CTV, Global, Radio-Canada and TVA) announced it would only invite the leaders of the four recognized parties in the House of Commons, namely the Conservative Party, the Liberal Party, the Bloc Québécois and the NDP. Therefore, the Green Party would be excluded. "This is an unacceptable, outrageous, high-handed attempt to shut down democracy in this country," May said in an interview aired on CBC News.

Prior to the October 2015 Federal election, May was invited to participate in two of the debates: one hosted by Maclean's magazine on 6 August 2015 and the first French language debate hosted by Radio-Canada on 24 September 2015. However, May was excluded from the other two debates. After being advised of the exclusion from The Munk Debate on Canada's Foreign Policy on 28 September 2015, May took her message to social media where she attacked the Harper government using tweets on Twitter.

In the 2019 election, May was excluded from the first French-language debate on October 2, 2019, hosted by TVA. TVA's criteria for inclusion in this debate was to have elected at least one MP in Quebec in the previous election, which the Green Party failed.

In the 2025 Canadian federal election, co-leader Jonathan Pedneault confirmed in March that he would represent the party in leaders' debates. However, on the morning of the French debate, Pedneault's invitation to the leaders' debates was rescinded as the Green Party did not meet the criteria to qualify for the debates. Pedneault criticized the decision as "undemocratic".

== List of Green MPs ==
There have been five (but three elected) Green Members of Parliament in Canadian history:

- Jenica Atwin (Fredericton, 2019–2021) - ran as a provincial Green candidate in the New Brunswick 2018 general election, but lost to PC candidate and incumbent MLA, Jeff Carr in the New Maryland-Sunbury district. She was later elected in 2019 as a federal Green in the Fredericton district. Crossed the floor to Liberals in 2021
- Bruce Hyer (Thunder Bay—Superior North, 2013–2015) - first elected in 2008 as a member of the New Democratic Party, Hyer left the NDP in 2012 to sit as an Independent after disagreement with his party over firearms legislation. Hyer joined the Green Party and its parliamentary caucus in 2013. He was defeated in the 2015 federal election by Liberal Patty Hajdu.
- Paul Manly (Nanaimo—Ladysmith, 2019–2021) - originally planned to run as an NDP federal MP candidate like his father and former politician, Jim Manly, but was blocked by the party itself over his stance on the Israeli–Palestinian conflict. Manly joined the Green Party to contest the riding as their candidate, but lost in the 2015 federal election, coming in fourth place. In the 2019 Nanaimo—Ladysmith by-election he once again ran, this time winning the seat. He was defeated in 2021.
- Elizabeth May (Saanich—Gulf Islands, 2011–present) - elected as a Green in 2011 and re-elected in 2015, 2019, and 2021.
- Mike Morrice (Kitchener Centre, 2021–present) - first Green MP from Ontario.
- Blair Wilson (West Vancouver—Sunshine Coast—Sea to Sky Country, 2008) - elected in 2006 as a Liberal. Wilson left the Liberal caucus in 2007 to sit as an Independent following allegations of improper campaign financing. In 2008, he joined the Green Party, becoming its first and only parliamentarian. He was defeated later in 2008 by Conservative John Weston. Wilson joined the Green Party during Parliament's summer break, and the 2008 election was called before the House reconvened. As such, he never physically sat in the House of Commons as a Green MP.

Two other Members of Parliament have been affiliated with the Green Party, but not as caucus members:

- José Núñez-Melo - elected in 2011 as a New Democrat in the riding of Laval, Núñez-Melo was barred by the NDP from seeking nomination for the 2015 election after he publicly criticized the nomination process. After the dropping of the writ, Núñez-Melo announced he would run for re-election in Vimy as a Green Party candidate. He was defeated by Liberal Eva Nassif. As Parliament was dissolved for the election at the time of Núñez-Melo's change in affiliation, he was never formally recorded as a Green MP.
- Pierre Nantel (Longueuil—Pierre-Boucher/Longueuil—Saint-Hubert, 2011–2019) - elected as a New Democrat in 2011 and 2015 in the same district. Prior to the next federal election, there were reports that sparked his removal from the NDP caucus, indicating that he was in talks with the Green Party. On 19 August 2019, it was announced that Nantel would be running under the Green Party banner in the 2019 federal election; he lost.

== See also ==
- Green Party of Ontario
