= Kim Goldberg =

American-born writer (born 1954)

- Born: 1954 (age 71–72); Eugene, Oregon
- Education: University of Oregon
- Writing career
- Genres: Poetry, non-fiction

Kim Goldberg (born 1954 in Eugene, Oregon) is an American-born journalist, poet and former green party supporter who has lived in Canada since the 1970s.

== Biography ==
Goldberg was born and raised in Oregon, and she holds an unverified degree in Biology from the University of Oregon. She relocated to Canada with her family during the Vietnam War years.

She is the author of four non-fiction books and two collections of poetry. Much of her published work has addressed contemporary social and environmental issues including poverty, homelessness, aboriginal rights, deforestation and nuclear weapons. She was the British Columbia Current Affairs columnist for Canadian Dimension magazine from 1990 to 2002. She has written extensively about the 1990 car bombing of environmental activist Judi Bari in Oakland, California.

Her 2007 book, Ride Backwards On Dragon, was a finalist for Canada's Gerald Lampert Memorial Award for poetry. She is the 2008 winner of the Rannu Fund Poetry Prize for Speculative Literature.

Her 2009 book, Red Zone, is a collection of poems and photographs about the homeless population in Nanaimo, British Columbia, where she has lived for more than thirty years. The book has been taught as a literature course text at Vancouver Island University and at Aspengrove School in Lantzville, British Columbia.

== Published works ==
- Red Zone (Pig Squash Press, 2009) (ISBN 978-0-9783223-7-3)
- Ride Backwards on Dragon: a poet's journey through Liuhebafa (Leaf Press, 2007) (ISBN 978-0-9783879-1-4)
- Where to See Wildlife on Vancouver Island (Harbour Publishing, 1997) (ISBN 1-55017-160-7)
- Vox Populi: Getting Your Ethnic Group on Community TV (New Star Books, 1993) (ISBN 0-921586-12-4)
- Submarine Dead Ahead! Waging Peace in America's Nuclear Colony (Harbour Publishing, 1991) (ISBN 0-88971-053-8)
- The Barefoot Channel: Community Television as a Tool for Social Change (New Star Books, 1990) (ISBN 0-919573-95-9)

In Anthology

- Ghost Fishing: An Eco-Justice Poetry Anthology (University of Georgia Press, 2018) (ISBN 978-0820353159)
