= John Blain (Canadian football) =

Canadian gridiron football player (born 1955)

No. 68
- Position: Offensive tackle

Personal information
- Born: February 1, 1955 (age 71); North Vancouver, British Columbia, Canada

Career information
- High school: Carson Graham Secondary School
- College: San José State
- NFL draft: 1977: 11th round, 285th overall pick

Career history
- 1977–1987: BC Lions

Awards and highlights
- Grey Cup champion (1985); 3× CFL All-Star (1983, 1984, 1985); BC Lions Wall of Fame

John Blain (born February 1, 1955) is a Canadian former professional football player with the Canadian Football League (CFL)'s the BC Lions. He attended Carson Graham Secondary School, where he joined the rugby and football team. After playing college football at San Jose State University, Blain spent his entire 11-year CFL career as an offensive lineman. He was named CFL All-Star in 1983, 1984 and 1985, and was a part of the Lions Grey Cup victory in 1985.

He was the Principal at Ladysmith Secondary School on Vancouver Island until the spring of 2009. Soon after, his occupation consisted of being a Principal at Dover Bay Secondary School on Vancouver Island until the summer of 2012.
