= Nanaimo—Ladysmith =

Federal electoral district in British Columbia, Canada

British Columbia electoral district
- Interactive map of riding boundaries from the 2025 federal election

Federal electoral district
- Legislature: House of Commons
MP
Tamara Kronis
Conservative
- District created: 2013
- First contested: 2015
- Last contested: 2025
- District webpage: profile, map

Demographics
- Population (2021): 134,509
- Electors (2021): 107,926
- Area (km²): 1,726.78
- Pop. density (per km²): 77.9
- Census division(s): Cowichan Valley, Nanaimo
- Census subdivision(s): Nanaimo (part), Ladysmith, Chemainus, Nanaimo Town, Nanaimo River, Oyster Bay, Lyacksun, Portier Pass, Shingle Point

Nanaimo—Ladysmith is a federal electoral district in British Columbia, in southeastern Vancouver Island.

Nanaimo—Ladysmith was created by the 2012 federal electoral boundaries redistribution and was legally defined in the 2013 representation order. It has come into effect with the call of the 42nd Canadian federal election, on August 2, 2015. Five-ninths of the riding came from the previous riding of Nanaimo—Cowichan and four-ninths from Nanaimo—Alberni.

== Demographics ==
Panethnic groups in Nanaimo—Ladysmith (2011−2021)
Panethnic group	2021		2016		2011	
Panethnic group	Pop.	%	Pop.	%	Pop.	%
European (Note: Statistic includes all persons that did not make up part of a visible minority or an indigenous identity.)	104,950	79.95%	99,615	83.36%	97,120	86.37%
Indigenous	11,775	8.97%	10,125	8.47%	8,020	7.13%
East Asian (Note: Statistic includes total responses of "Chinese", "Korean", and "Japanese" under visible minority section on census.)	4,720	3.6%	3,550	2.97%	2,600	2.31%
South Asian	3,250	2.48%	2,065	1.73%	1,980	1.76%
Southeast Asian (Note: Statistic includes total responses of "Filipino" and "Southeast Asian" under visible minority section on census.)	2,935	2.24%	1,950	1.63%	1,265	1.12%
African	1,345	1.02%	785	0.66%	510	0.45%
Latin American	770	0.59%	510	0.43%	305	0.27%
Middle Eastern (Note: Statistic includes total responses of "West Asian" and "Arab" under visible minority section on census.)	750	0.57%	465	0.39%	280	0.25%
Other (Note: Statistic includes total responses of "Visible minority, n.i.e." and "Multiple visible minorities" under visible minority section on census.)	775	0.59%	415	0.35%	365	0.32%
Total responses	131,265	97.59%	119,495	97.38%	112,445	97.78%
Total population	134,509	100%	122,710	100%	114,998	100%
Notes: Totals greater than 100% due to multiple origin responses. Demographics based on 2012 Canadian federal electoral redistribution riding boundaries.

According to the 2021 Canadian census

Languages: 87.4% English, 1.2% French, 1.2% Mandarin
Religions: 62.9% No religion, 31.7% Christian (9.2% Catholic, 4% United Church, 3.9% Anglican, 1.2% Baptist, 1.2% Lutheran), 1.1% Sikh
Median income (2020): $39,600
Average income (2020): $49,080

== Members of Parliament ==
This riding has elected the following members of the House of Commons of Canada:

Parliament	Years	Member	Party
Nanaimo—Ladysmith; Riding created from Nanaimo—Alberni and Nanaimo—Cowichan
42nd	2015–2019	Sheila Malcolmson	New Democratic
42nd	2019–2019	Paul Manly	Green
43rd	2019–2021	Paul Manly	Green
44th	2021–2025	Lisa Marie Barron	New Democratic
45th	2025–present	Tamara Kronis	Conservative

== Election results ==
View source data.
Graph of election results in Nanaimo—Ladysmith (minor parties that never got 2% of the vote or didn't run consistently are omitted)

=== 2023 representation order ===
2025 Canadian federal election
Party	Candidate	Votes	%	±%	Expenditures
Conservative	Tamara Kronis	26,381	35.46	+8.88	$145,789.79
Liberal	Michelle Corfield	20,656	27.76	+14.59	$76,957.41
New Democratic	Lisa Marie Barron	13,586	18.26	–11.12	$128,669.75
Green	Paul Manly	13,485	18.13	–7.72	$141,314.20
People's	Stephen Welton	289	0.39	–4.62	$687.39
Total valid votes/expense limit		74,397	99.65	–	$147,088.21
Total rejected ballots		261	0.35	–0.05	
Turnout		74,658	72.59	+8.95	
Eligible voters		102,856			
Conservative notional gain from New Democratic		Swing		+10.00	
Source: Elections Canada

2021 federal election redistributed results
Party	Vote	%
New Democratic	18,307	29.38
Conservative	16,566	26.58
Green	16,110	25.85
Liberal	8,214	13.18
People's	3,123	5.01

=== 2013 representation order ===
2021 Canadian federal election
Party	Candidate	Votes	%	±%	Expenditures
New Democratic	Lisa Marie Barron	19,826	28.83	+5.20	$64,122.25
Conservative	Tamara Kronis	18,627	27.09	+1.16	$126,769.27
Green	Paul Manly	17,640	25.65	–8.92	$112,978.84
Liberal	Michelle Corfield	9,314	13.54	+0.00	$33,839.39
People's	Stephen Welton	3,358	4.88	+3.42	$8,293.38
Total valid votes/expense limit		68,765	99.60	–	$133,040.69
Total rejected ballots		277	0.40	+0.09	
Turnout		69,042	63.64	–5.23	
Eligible voters		108,490			
New Democratic gain from Green		Swing		+7.06	
Source: Elections Canada

2019 Canadian federal election
Party	Candidate	Votes	%	±%	Expenditures
Green	Paul Manly	24,844	34.57	–2.69	$114,262.60
Conservative	John Hirst	18,634	25.93	+1.05	$69,699.61
New Democratic	Bob Chamberlin	16,985	23.63	+0.63	$124,040.89
Liberal	Michelle Corfield	9,735	13.55	+2.55	$54,497.02
People's	Jennifer Clarke	1,049	1.46	–1.63	$1,490.51
Independent	Geoff Stoneman	235	0.33	–	$8,218.51
Progressive Canadian	Brian Marlatt	207	0.29	–0.33	$364.97
Communist	James Chumsa	104	0.14	–	$476.56
Independent	Echo White	71	0.10	–	$360.48
Total valid votes/expense limit		71,864	99.69	–	$126,223.23
Total rejected ballots		225	0.31	–0.00	
Turnout		72,089	68.87	+27.70	
Eligible voters		104,678			
Green hold		Swing		–1.87	
Source: Elections Canada

Canadian federal by-election, May 6, 2019 Resignation of Sheila Malcolmson
Party	Candidate	Votes	%	±%	Expenditures
Green	Paul Manly	15,302	37.26	+17.51	$121,022.28
Conservative	John Hirst	10,215	24.88	+1.52	$89,135.02
New Democratic	Bob Chamberlin	9,446	23.00	–10.20	$112,824.14
Liberal	Michelle Corfield	4,515	10.99	–12.52	$106,558.39
People's	Jennifer Clarke	1,268	3.09	–	$24,975.18
Progressive Canadian	Brian Marlatt	253	0.62	–	$2,066.90
National Citizens Alliance	Jakob Letkemann	66	0.16	–	none listed
Total valid votes/expense limit		41,065	99.68	–	$142,885.98
Total rejected ballots		130	0.32	+0.09	
Turnout		41,195	41.16	–33.83	
Eligible voters		100,074			
Green gain from New Democratic		Swing		+13.85	
Source: Elections Canada

2015 Canadian federal election
Party	Candidate	Votes	%	±%	Expenditures
New Democratic	Sheila Malcolmson	23,651	33.20	–12.06	$136,135.63
Liberal	Tim Tessier	16,753	23.52	+16.84	$21,699.17
Conservative	Mark Allen MacDonald	16,637	23.35	–17.04	$132,376.87
Green	Paul Manly	14,074	19.76	+12.58	$144,816.61
Marxist–Leninist	Jack East	126	0.18	–	none listed
Total valid votes/expense limit		71,241	99.78	–	$236,098.07
Total rejected ballots		158	0.22		
Turnout		71,399	75.00		
Eligible voters		95,200			
New Democratic notional hold		Swing		–14.45	
Source: Elections Canada

2011 federal election redistributed results
Party	Vote	%
New Democratic	25,294	45.26
Conservative	22,572	40.39
Green	4,009	7.17
Liberal	3,733	6.68
Others	276	0.49

== See also ==
- List of Canadian electoral districts
- Historical federal electoral districts of Canada
