= Lantzville =

- District municipality
- District of Lantzville
- Location of Lantzville within the Regional District of Nanaimo on Vancouver Island
- Coordinates: 49°15′N 124°4′W
- Country: Canada
- Province: British Columbia
- Regional district: Nanaimo
- Incorporated: 2003

Government
  - Mayor: Mark Swain
  - Governing body: District of Lantzville Council
  - MP: Lisa Marie Barron (NDP)
  - MLA: Adam Walker (BC NDP)

Area
  - Total: 27.08 km^{2} (10.46 sq mi)
- Elevation: 20 m (66 ft)

Population (2021)
  - Total: 3,817
  - Density: 130.2/km^{2} (337/sq mi)
- Time zone: UTC−07:00 (PT)
- Postal code span: V0R 2H0
- Area code: +1-250
- Website: District of Lantzville

Lantzville is a coastal community on the east side of Vancouver Island, British Columbia, Canada, along the western shore of the Strait of Georgia and immediately north of Nanaimo.

The District of Lantzville was incorporated on June 25, 2003. It covers an area of 27.08 square kilometres (10.46 sq mi) and has a population of 3,807. The district is almost completely residential, with some commercial buildings on Lantzville Road (formerly part of the Island Highway).

The area is served by the coast-spanning Island Highway and the Island Rail Corridor.

== History ==
Lantzville was originally a mining town founded by J.J. Grant, a mining promoter who started digging for coal in 1916. The mine was later bought by Fraser Harry Lantz. Lantz was born in Chester Basin, Nova Scotia, in 1868, but soon left to make his fortune in Western Canada.

As the mine grew, the town took on Lantz's name, and in honour of its history as a coal mining area, Lantzville annually celebrates Minetown Day, which is a community fair. According to Lantzville: The First Hundred Years, the first European settler in the area was an English coal miner named Emanuel Wiles, also known as Robert Emanuel or Bob. Lantzville is a tourist destination with a number of well-located bed and breakfast operations.

== Demographics ==
In the 2021 Census of Population conducted by Statistics Canada, Lantzville had a population of 3,817 living in 1,520 of its 1,568 total private dwellings, a change of 5.9% from its 2016 population of 3,605. With a land area of 27.68 km^{2} (10.69 sq mi), it had a population density of 137.9/km^{2} (357.2/sq mi) in 2021.

=== Ethnicity ===
Panethnic groups in the District of Lantzville (2006−2021)
| Panethnic group | 2021 | | 2016 | | 2011 | | 2006 | |
| Panethnic group | Pop. | % | Pop. | % | Pop. | % | Pop. | % |
|---|---|---|---|---|---|---|---|---|
| European (Note: Statistic includes all persons that did not make up part of a visible minority or an indigenous identity.) | 3,415 | 89.4% | 3,200 | 88.77% | 3,420 | 93.19% | 3,440 | 94.12% |
| Indigenous | 225 | 5.89% | 155 | 4.3% | 55 | 1.5% | 90 | 2.46% |
| Southeast Asian (Note: Statistic includes total responses of "Filipino" and "Southeast Asian" under visible minority section on census.) | 80 | 2.09% | 35 | 0.97% | 0 | 0% | 20 | 0.55% |
| East Asian (Note: Statistic includes total responses of "Chinese", "Korean", and "Japanese" under visible minority section on census.) | 50 | 1.31% | 45 | 1.25% | 110 | 3% | 105 | 2.87% |
| African | 30 | 0.79% | 30 | 0.83% | 0 | 0% | 0 | 0% |
| South Asian | 0 | 0% | 90 | 2.5% | 30 | 0.82% | 0 | 0% |
| Middle Eastern (Note: Statistic includes total responses of "West Asian" and "Arab" under visible minority section on census.) | 0 | 0% | 20 | 0.55% | 0 | 0% | 0 | 0% |
| Latin American | 0 | 0% | 15 | 0.42% | 0 | 0% | 0 | 0% |
| Other/multiracial (Note: Statistic includes total responses of "Visible minority, n.i.e." and "Multiple visible minorities" under visible minority section on census.) | 0 | 0% | 25 | 0.69% | 0 | 0% | 0 | 0% |
| Total responses | 3,820 | 100.08% | 3,605 | 100% | 3,670 | 101.92% | 3,655 | 99.84% |
| Total population | 3,817 | 100% | 3,605 | 100% | 3,601 | 100% | 3,661 | 100% |
Note: Totals greater than 100% due to multiple origin responses.

=== Religion ===
According to the 2021 census, religious groups in Lantzville included:

- Irreligion (2,440 persons or 63.9%)
- Christianity (1,285 persons or 33.6%)
- Buddhism (15 persons or 0.4%)
- Other (55 persons or 1.4%)

== Education ==
Lantzville is home to Seaview Elementary School which is K - 7 and part of the Nanaimo-Ladysmith School District #68. There is also a local private school called Aspengrove School, which is JK - 12.

Grades 8 - 12 are schooled in Nanaimo at Dover Bay Secondary School.

== Notable residents ==
- John Wilson
- Dylan Ferguson
- Callum Montgomery
