= Wellington Secondary School =

Location
- 3135 Mexicana Rd; Nanaimo, British Columbia; Canada; 49.20925°N 124.00024°W

Information
- Type: Public School
- Established: 1967
- School district: School District 68 Nanaimo-Ladysmith
- Principal: Darcy Hoff
- Faculty: 50+
- Teaching staff: 2.5
- Grades: 8-12
- Enrollment: Approx 1100
- Colours: Maroon and Gold
- Mascot: Welly the Wildcat
- USNWR ranking: 201/252 (provincial)
- Website: we.schools.sd68.bc.ca

Wellington Secondary School is a public high school located in Nanaimo, British Columbia. It is part of School District 68 Nanaimo-Ladysmith and is known for its jazz music program.

Wellington Secondary School is the catchment school for the Wellington, Departure Bay, and Uplands neighbourhoods.

Wellington Secondary takes in kids from Uplands, Rock City, Departure Bay, syuw̓én̓ct, and Cilaire Elementary schools.

== History ==
Wellington Secondary was founded in 1967 as a junior high school, grades 8 through 10. Since its initial construction in 1966 and 1967, the building has had additions in 1973, 1979, 2001, and 2016. Five elementary schools currently feed into Wellington Secondary.

From 1875 to 1944, Wellington Public School was the school located on the top field behind what is now called Mount Benson Elementary School. Although Wellington Secondary is a relatively new school, it has the historical "Wellington" neighbourhood school name, which predates the province's oldest high school, (Victoria High School, est. 1876) by one year.

== Music ==
Wellington "swingin" Secondary consists of numerous award-winning jazz bands and concert bands, under the direction of award-winning music teacher Carmella Luvisotto. Luvisotto, a personal friend of jazz musicians Ingrid Jensen and Diana Krall, has provided her students with many unique and memorable musical opportunities throughout the years. The concert bands, which include a grade 8 concert band and a senior concert band, have travelled to various festivals in British Columbia. The jazz bands, which range from grade 9 to 12, have also been to a number of festivals, including the Envision Jazz Festival in Surrey, British Columbia, the Lionel Hampton Jazz Festival in Moscow, Idaho, and MusicFest Canada in Vancouver (1998), Richmond (2005 and 2007), Montreal (2004), Ottawa (2001, 2006, 2008 and 2010), Toronto (1999, 2000, 2003 and 2009), and Calgary (2002).

== Athletics ==
Wellington Secondary's athletics program includes volleyball, basketball, soccer, and rugby teams. In 2005, the Wellington Senior Boys Basketball team came second in the AAA Provincial Basketball Tournament. The Wellington Senior Girls Basketball team came eighth in 2012 and third in 2013 at the AA BC Provincial Basketball Championships in Kamloops.

The Wellington Wildcat golf team place 4th in the 2022 AA provincial golf tournament. In 2023, after moving up to the AAA level they placed 13th in the provincial tournament. At the 2024 BC AAA provincial golf tournament, the Wildcats placed 4th after winning two regional playoff tournaments (North Island and Island championships). This was the best finish at this level in school history
The school mascot is Welly the Wildcat.

== School tournaments ==
Wellington Secondary holds a variety of tournaments in multiple fields. Some of these tournaments are:

- Annual Dodgeball, Floor Hockey tournaments.
- Annual Superball Basketball tournament.
- Two yearly PC game tournaments, which vary every year. Games used in past tournaments include StarCraft, Tribes: Vengeance, and Trackmania Nations
