= Mount Benson Elementary School (Nanaimo) =

Location
- 4355 Jingle Pot Road; Nanaimo, British Columbia; Canada
- Coordinates: 49°12′21.34″N 124°1′11.54″W

Information
- School type: Public, Elementary school
- Founded: 1874 (Current Building 1950)
- School board: School District 68 Nanaimo-Ladysmith
- Grades: K–7
- Language: English
- Communities served: Wellington neighbourhood
- Website: www.mountbensonschool.ca

Mount Benson Elementary was a public elementary school located in the Wellington neighbourhood of Nanaimo, British Columbia and was part of School District 68 Nanaimo-Ladysmith. It was closed in 2008.

Opened on the historic Wellington Public School Site, Mount Benson Elementary was the oldest operating school site in British Columbia.

== History ==
The original school site was provided by Robert Dunsmuir of Dunsmuir & Diggle Co to accommodate a public school for their new coal town of Wellington and the families working in the Wellington Colliery. The first official public school on this site was called "Wellington Public School" and opened on May 20, 1875 as part of the Wellington School District which had been created a year earlier. In 1904, a few years after James Dunsmuir closed the Wellington mine and moved his buildings to Ladysmith, the school was destroyed by fire. A new one room school was completed in 1906 and was later expanded into a two-room school. At this time most of the children's fathers worked for another of Robert Dunsmuir's creations, the E&N Railway. Wellington was the main works yard and the school was located adjacent to both the main station and the roundhouse. World War II created teacher shortages across British Columbia which was the catalyst for the 1942 amalgamation of Wellington into the "Nanaimo-Ladysmith United Rural School District". The second school was destroyed by fire shortly after 1944 while the community was in the process of creating a neighbourhood athletic centre in the school building. In 1945 Wellington's new school district split into "Nanaimo United", and "Ladysmith United", both of which eventually amalgamated into what is the current "Nanaimo-Ladysmith School District".

In 1950 the school was rebuilt as a 3 classroom school, at which point it received a name change and became Mount Benson Elementary School. The school continued to expand and currently has 10 classrooms.

Mount Benson School closed in June 2008, as a result of provincial funding cuts and policy changes legislated by bill 34 which resulted in 50% of neighbourhood students attending out of catchment.

During 2008 and 2009 the Wellington community and School District have been working towards creating a community centre at the school.

== Name ==
Mount Benson Elementary got its name from Mount Benson, which the school has an excellent view of, and because it was the public school for children who lived on the north-east slope of the Mountain. The Mountain itself was named after Doctor Alfred Benson, who was an Employee of the Hudson's Bay Company, the first doctor in the area, a photographer, a collier and a friend of Robert Dunsmuir, the founder of Wellington. The name of "Wellington" was moved to the junior high school level with the opening of a Wellington Junior High School in 1967.
