= Ladysmith Harbour =

Harbour in British Columbia, Canada

Coordinates: 48°59′27″N 123°48′00″W

Ladysmith Harbour, originally Oyster Harbour, is a harbour adjoining the Town of Ladysmith on Vancouver Island, British Columbia. The Ladysmith area was originally known as Oyster Harbour when it came into use as a coaling port for the Dunsmuir-owned mine at Extension.

== Oyster Bay Indian Reserve No. 12 ==
Oyster Bay Indian Reserve No. 12, one of the reserves of the Stz'uminus First Nation, is located on the south shore of the harbour, near its head.

== Chemainus Indian Reserve No. 13 ==
Chemainus Indian Reserve No. 13, the largest of the Stz'uminus reserves, is located on the headland on the outer, southwest side of the harbour.

== Oceanographic research ==
From 1938 to 1942, and then again from 1949 to 1957, the British Columbia Shore Station Oceanographic Program was collecting coastal water temperature and salinity measurements for the Department of Fisheries and Oceans from Ladysmith Harbour everyday during this period.

== See also ==
- Oyster Harbour
