= Paul Manly =

Canadian politician (born 1964)

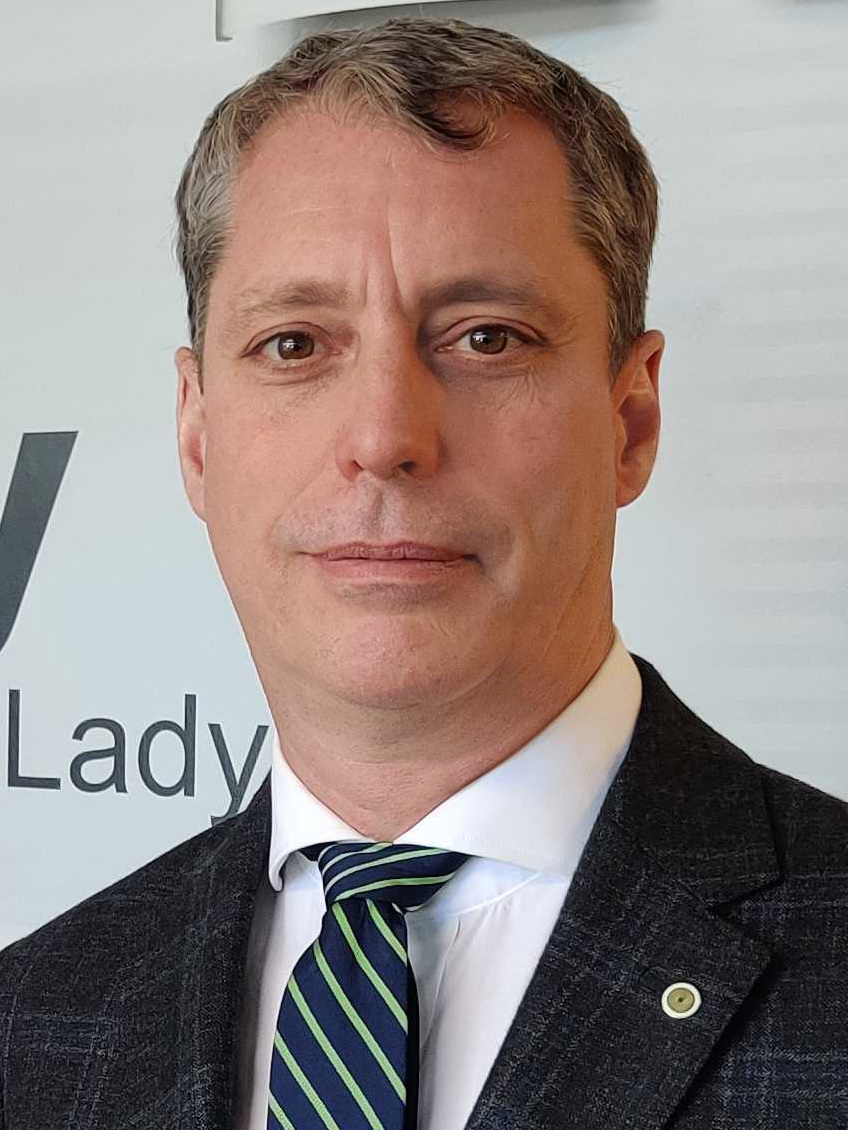
- Manly in 2021

Member of Parliament for Nanaimo—Ladysmith
- In office May 6, 2019 – September 20, 2021
- Preceded by: Sheila Malcolmson
- Succeeded by: Lisa Marie Barron

Nanaimo City Councillor
- Incumbent
- Assumed office October 15, 2022

Acting Executive Director of the Green Party of Canada
- In office 2024 – August 2025
- Preceded by: Jon Irwin (interim)
- Succeeded by: Robin Marty (interim)

Personal details
- Born: April 19, 1964 (age 62) Port Alice, British Columbia, Canada
- Party: Green (2015–present)
- Other political affiliations: New Democratic (prior to 2015)
- Children: 2
- Parent(s): James and Eva Manly
- Profession: Filmmaker, researcher and communications specialist

Paul Manly (born April 19, 1964) is a Canadian politician who served as the Member of Parliament (MP) for Nanaimo—Ladysmith from 2019 until 2021. A member of the Green Party of Canada, he was elected to the House of Commons in a by-election on May 6, 2019, making him the second elected Green federal MP in Canadian history, following party leader Elizabeth May's first election victory in the 2011 federal election.

== Early and personal life ==
Manly was born in Port Alice, British Columbia. His grandfather had a farm just outside of Nanaimo and Manly spent his formative years growing up in Ladysmith. He has been living in Nanaimo since 2002. His father, James Manly was a United Church minister and a New Democratic Party member of the House of Commons for the 32nd and 33rd Canadian Parliaments. His mother Eva Manly, a graduate of the University of Ottawa (BFA '85) is a multi-disciplinary artist who has collaborated with him on several video and documentary projects.

Manly graduated from Algonquin College in Ottawa with a diploma in broadcasting and went on to earn a degree in media studies and global studies from Vancouver Island University. Manly is married to Samantha Letourneau, and has two daughters and one granddaughter.

== Career ==
Manly started making documentary films 1991. His first major film was a collaboration with his parents on a historic documentary about residential schools, entitled the Awakening of Elizabeth Shaw. This video documents one white woman's response to the unfair and inhumane treatment of First Nations children in British Columbia's residential schools. He collaborated with his parents again on a film about human rights workers in Guatemala entitled ‘Bringing Truth to Light’.

His film Sombrio documents the end of a community of surfers and squatters on the south west coast of Vancouver Island. In 2007, Manly videotaped one police provocateur inciting violence at the Security and Prosperity Partnership (SPP) leaders event. He included that footage in his film ‘You, Me and the SPP’, which he released in 2009. Manly has made two films about water issues on Vancouver Island, ‘Voices of the River’ about the Nanaimo River, and ‘Troubled Water’ about the community drinking-water watershed on the east coast of the island.

In 2010, Manly produced a video about the export of raw bitumen out of the Port of Vancouver and the Trans Mountain pipeline expansion. He then produced a PSA with Pamela Anderson about the issue.

He was an equipment manager at the Satellite Video Exchange Society for six years.

He was a director on the board of the development company for the Pacific Gardens Cohousing Community, a multi-million dollar housing project. He served 11 years as a board director of Mid Island Consumer Services Cooperative. Previously, Manly was also a director on the national board of the Council of Canadians representing the B.C. Yukon region.

== Politics ==
Manly initially sought the NDP nomination for Nanaimo—Ladysmith in the 2015 election. He was denied by the party's federal executive for publicly criticizing the NDP because the party did not advocate on behalf of his father Jim when the former MP was detained for four days by the Israeli military in 2012. He ran for the Green Party in that election, finishing in fourth place.

Manly was elected to the House of Commons in a by-election on May 6, 2019, making him the second elected Green MP in Canadian history, following party leader Elizabeth May's first election victory in the 2011 federal election.

He was re-elected in the 2019 federal election. Manly has been a critic of the extradition case against Meng Wanzhou.

During the 43rd Parliament Manly introduced two private member bills (though neither came to a vote): Bill C-261 to prohibit marine vessels from loading thermal coal that is to be transported outside Canada, and Bill C-252 that would require public consultation during the course of international trade negotiations.

Manly was defeated in the 2021 federal election.

In 2022, he was elected to Nanaimo City Council in the 2022 British Columbia municipal elections.

Manly again ran as the Green party candidate in Nanaimo—Ladysmith during the 2025 election, coming in fourth place.

From fall 2024 until August 2025, Manly served as Acting Executive Director of the Green Party of Canada.

=== Parliamentary work ===
In February 2020, Manly submitted an amendment to Bill C-4, the Canada-United States-Mexico Agreement Implementation Act, to the Standing Committee on International Trade.

In February 2021, Manly submitted five amendments to Bill C-18, the Canada-United Kingdom Trade Continuity Agreement Implementation Act, to the Standing Committee on International Trade.

In April 2021, 4 of Manly's 29 submitted amendments were adopted by the members of the Standing Committee on Canadian Heritage on Bill C-10, An Act to amend the Broadcasting Act.

== Electoral record ==
2025 Canadian federal election: Nanaimo—Ladysmith
Party	Candidate	Votes	%	±%	Expenditures
Conservative	Tamara Kronis	26,381	35.46	+8.88	$145,789.79
Liberal	Michelle Corfield	20,656	27.76	+14.59	$76,957.41
New Democratic	Lisa Marie Barron	13,586	18.26	–11.12	$128,669.75
Green	Paul Manly	13,485	18.13	–7.72	$141,314.20
People's	Stephen Welton	289	0.39	–4.62	$687.39
Total valid votes/expense limit		74,397	99.65	–	$147,088.21
Total rejected ballots		261	0.35	–0.05	
Turnout		74,658	72.59	+8.95	
Eligible voters		102,856			
Conservative notional gain from New Democratic		Swing		+10.00	
Source: Elections Canada

=== Nanaimo City Council election ===
The results for Nanaimo City Council during the 2022 British Columbia municipal elections were as follows:

Top 8 candidates elected

Council candidate	Vote	%
Paul Manly	10,366	8.36
Sheryl Armstrong (X) †	10,260	8.27
Ben Geselbracht (X) †	8,383	6.76
Ian Thorpe (X) †	8,040	6.48
Erin Hemmens (X) †	7,497	6.04
Janice Perrino †	7,131	5.75
Tyler Brown (X) †	6,805	5.49
Hilary Eastmure †	5,650	4.55
Don Bonner (X)	5,524	4.45
Norm Smith	5,254	4.24
Nick Greer	5,050	4.07
Zeni Maartman (X)	4,759	3.84
Peter Lee	4,022	3.24
Gary Korpan	3,769	3.04
Michael Ribicic	3,357	2.71
Alan MacDonald	3,336	2.69
Paul Chapman	3,298	2.66
Viraat B. Thammanna	3,100	2.50
Mike Hartlaub	2,731	2.20
Shirley Lambrecht	2,540	2.05
Frank Pluta	2,384	1.92
Derek Hanna	2,295	1.85
David Wang	2,004	1.62
Ken Bennett	1,847	1.49
Jeff Annesley	1,586	1.28
Peter Poole	934	0.75
Corey Trinkwon	757	0.61
Robb Squire	734	0.59
Jay Krishan	627	0.51

2021 Canadian federal election: Nanaimo—Ladysmith
Party	Candidate	Votes	%	±%	Expenditures
New Democratic	Lisa Marie Barron	19,826	28.83	+5.20	$64,122.25
Conservative	Tamara Kronis	18,627	27.09	+1.16	$126,769.27
Green	Paul Manly	17,640	25.65	–8.92	$112,978.84
Liberal	Michelle Corfield	9,314	13.54	+0.00	$33,839.39
People's	Stephen Welton	3,358	4.88	+3.42	$8,293.38
Total valid votes/expense limit		68,765	99.60	–	$133,040.69
Total rejected ballots		277	0.40	+0.09	
Turnout		69,042	63.64	–5.23	
Eligible voters		108,490			
New Democratic gain from Green		Swing		+7.06	
Source: Elections Canada

2019 Canadian federal election: Nanaimo—Ladysmith
Party	Candidate	Votes	%	±%	Expenditures
Green	Paul Manly	24,844	34.57	–2.69	$114,262.60
Conservative	John Hirst	18,634	25.93	+1.05	$69,699.61
New Democratic	Bob Chamberlin	16,985	23.63	+0.63	$124,040.89
Liberal	Michelle Corfield	9,735	13.55	+2.55	$54,497.02
People's	Jennifer Clarke	1,049	1.46	–1.63	$1,490.51
Independent	Geoff Stoneman	235	0.33	–	$8,218.51
Progressive Canadian	Brian Marlatt	207	0.29	–0.33	$364.97
Communist	James Chumsa	104	0.14	–	$476.56
Independent	Echo White	71	0.10	–	$360.48
Total valid votes/expense limit		71,864	99.69	–	$126,223.23
Total rejected ballots		225	0.31	–0.00	
Turnout		72,089	68.87	+27.70	
Eligible voters		104,678			
Green hold		Swing		–1.87	
Source: Elections Canada

Canadian federal by-election, May 6, 2019: Nanaimo—Ladysmith Resignation of Sheila Malcolmson
Party	Candidate	Votes	%	±%	Expenditures
Green	Paul Manly	15,302	37.26	+17.51	$121,022.28
Conservative	John Hirst	10,215	24.88	+1.52	$89,135.02
New Democratic	Bob Chamberlin	9,446	23.00	–10.20	$112,824.14
Liberal	Michelle Corfield	4,515	10.99	–12.52	$106,558.39
People's	Jennifer Clarke	1,268	3.09	–	$24,975.18
Progressive Canadian	Brian Marlatt	253	0.62	–	$2,066.90
National Citizens Alliance	Jakob Letkemann	66	0.16	–	none listed
Total valid votes/expense limit		41,065	99.68	–	$142,885.98
Total rejected ballots		130	0.32	+0.09	
Turnout		41,195	41.16	–33.83	
Eligible voters		100,074			
Green gain from New Democratic		Swing		+13.85	
Source: Elections Canada

2015 Canadian federal election: Nanaimo—Ladysmith
Party	Candidate	Votes	%	±%	Expenditures
New Democratic	Sheila Malcolmson	23,651	33.20	–12.06	$136,135.63
Liberal	Tim Tessier	16,753	23.52	+16.84	$21,699.17
Conservative	Mark Allen MacDonald	16,637	23.35	–17.04	$132,376.87
Green	Paul Manly	14,074	19.76	+12.58	$144,816.61
Marxist–Leninist	Jack East	126	0.18	–	none listed
Total valid votes/expense limit		71,241	99.78	–	$236,098.07
Total rejected ballots		158	0.22		
Turnout		71,399	75.00		
Eligible voters		95,200			
New Democratic notional hold		Swing		–14.45	
Source: Elections Canada
