= 2019 Nanaimo—Ladysmith federal by-election =

- May 6, 2019

Riding of Nanaimo—Ladysmith
- Turnout: 41.44% (▼33.56pp)
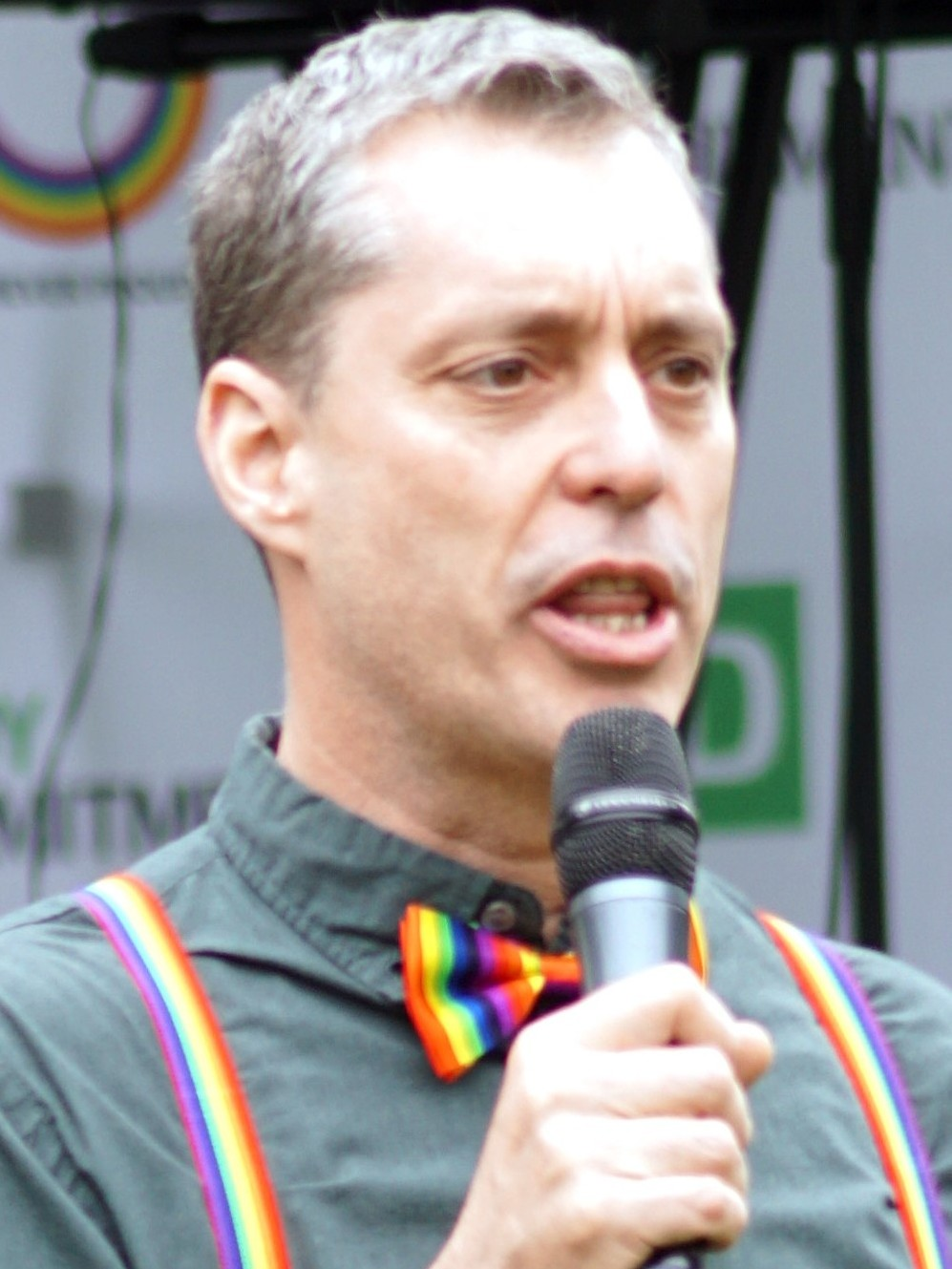

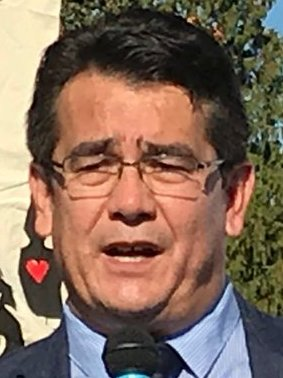
| | First party | Second party |
|---|---|---|
| | | CPC |
| Candidate | Paul Manly | John Hirst |
| Party | Green | Conservative |
| Popular vote | 15,302 | 10,215 |
| Percentage | 37.26% | 24.88% |
| Swing | ▲17.51pp | ▲1.52pp |
| | Third party | Fourth party |
| | | LPC |
| Candidate | Bob Chamberlin | Michelle Corfield |
| Party | New Democratic | Liberal |
| Popular vote | 9,446 | 4,515 |
| Percentage | 23.00% | 10.99% |
| Swing | ▼10.20pp | ▼12.52pp |
MP before election
Sheila Malcolmson
New Democratic
Elected MP
Paul Manly
Green

A by-election was held in the federal riding of Nanaimo—Ladysmith on May 6, 2019, following the resignation of incumbent New Democratic MP Sheila Malcolmson.

Green candidate Paul Manly won the by-election, becoming the second Green Party member to be elected to the House of Commons.

== Result ==
Canadian federal by-election, May 6, 2019: Nanaimo—Ladysmith Resignation of Sheila Malcolmson
| Party | Candidate | Votes | % | ±% |
|---|---|---|---|---|
| Green | Paul Manly | 15,302 | 37.26 | +17.51 |
| Conservative | John Hirst | 10,215 | 24.88 | +1.52 |
| New Democratic | Bob Chamberlin | 9,446 | 23.00 | –10.20 |
| Liberal | Michelle Corfield | 4,515 | 10.99 | –12.52 |
| People's | Jennifer Clarke | 1,268 | 3.09 | |
| Progressive Canadian | Brian Marlatt | 253 | 0.62 | |
| National Citizens Alliance | Jakob Letkemann | 66 | 0.16 | |
| Total valid votes/expense limit | | 41,065 | 99.68 | – |
| Total rejected ballots | | 130 | 0.32 | +0.09 |
| Turnout | | 41,195 | 41.16 | -33.84 |
| Eligible voters | | 100,074 | | |
| Green gain from New Democratic | | Swing | | +13.85 |
Source: Elections Canada; Maclean's

== Previous result ==
2015 Canadian federal election: Nanaimo—Ladysmith
| Party | Candidate | Votes | % | ±% | Expenditures |
|---|---|---|---|---|---|
| New Democratic | Sheila Malcolmson | 23,651 | 33.20 | -12.06 | $136,135.63 |
| Liberal | Tim Tessier | 16,753 | 23.52 | +16.84 | $21,699.17 |
| Conservative | Mark Allen MacDonald | 16,637 | 23.35 | -17.04 | $132,376.87 |
| Green | Paul Manly | 14,074 | 19.76 | +12.58 | $145,016.61 |
| Marxist–Leninist | Jack East | 126 | 0.18 | – | – |
| Total valid votes/expense limit | | 71,241 | 99.78 | | $236,098.07 |
| Total rejected ballots | | 158 | 0.22 | – | |
| Turnout | | 71,399 | 75.00 | – | |
| Eligible voters | | 95,200 | | | |
| New Democratic notional hold | | Swing | | -14.45 | |
Source: Elections Canada

== See also ==
- By-elections to the 42nd Canadian Parliament
