= Wellington, British Columbia =

Wellington
- Location of Wellington in British Columbia
- Coordinates: 49°12′28″N 124°00′55″W
- Country: Canada
- Province: British Columbia
- Region: Vancouver Island
- Regional District: Nanaimo
- Elevation: 115 m (377 ft)

Population (2006)
  - Total: 3,935 (Diver Lake)
  - Density: 988.1/km^{2} (2,559/sq mi)
- Time zone: UTC−07:00 (PT)
- Area codes: 250, 778, 236, & 672
- Highways: Highway 19
- Website: Official website

Wellington, formerly a separate district and town, is a neighbourhood of north Nanaimo, on the east coast of southern Vancouver Island, British Columbia.

== First Nations & European settlement ==
Wellington was part of the traditional territories of the Sneneymuxw and Nanoose First Nations, who coexisted with European arrivals. The district was likely named in the 1850s following the 1852 death of Arthur Wellesley, 1st Duke of Wellington. Prior to 1869, few settlers inhabited the areas around Brannen, Long, and Diver lakes.

== Dunsmuir discovery ==
Opened around 1860 by the Hudson's Bay Company (HBC), Douglas Mine, in today's downtown Nanaimo, was the first coalmine in the region. While fishing about 8 kilometres (5 mi) northwest at Diver Lake in 1869, former HBC employee Robert Dunsmuir observed evidence of coal deposits, in what he would call the Wellington seam. The location was just beyond the northern boundary of the Vancouver Coal Mining and Land Company's property, acquired from the HBC in 1862.

== Neighbourhoods ==
In the early 1890s, the population peaked at over 5,000, larger than Nanaimo at the time. By the late 1890s, the mines were nearly exhausted, and mining activity had shifted to Extension.

=== Wellington ===
==== Coalmine ====
In partnership with Royal Navy Lieutenant Wadham Nestor Diggle, Dunsmuir received a mining lease in 1871 for an area south of Long Lake, defined by boundaries from its shores of 1.2 kilometres (0.7 mi) westward, 1.4 kilometres (0.9 mi) eastward, and 0.8 kilometres (0.5 mi) southward.

In 1872, the two principals, with junior partners, obtained a 1,032-acre (4.18 km^{2}) Crown grant of land largely covering the mining lease, but with the northern boundary extended to capture the north shore of Long Lake. The partners established Dunsmuir, Diggle & Company and developed the Wellington Collieries. Mining commenced west of Diver Lake.

In 1877, labour disputes led to violent confrontations between strikers and strikebreakers. The BC government declared martial law sending in troops to restore order. The next year, sabotage on a tramway caused the horrific death of a Chinese employee. In 1879, 11 miners died in an explosion of coal dust or by inhaling the resulting toxic gases. Around this time, Dunsmuir bought out two of his partners. The next year, 75 died in another explosion. In 1883, Dunsmuir bought out Diggle, the remaining partner.

In 1910, Sir William Mackenzie purchased all the Dunsmuir mines through his Canadian Collieries (Dunsmuir).

==== Railways ====
By 1873, the company replaced the wagon road with a horse-drawn wooden tramway, superseded the next year by a 0.76-metre (2 ft 6 in) wide narrow gauge railway to cover the 7.4 kilometres (4.6 mi) to the company wharf at the northwest corner of Departure Bay, from where company steamboats transported the coal to San Francisco. At the lower elevation, a long loop in the line was needed to create an acceptable gradient.

Dunsmuir established the E&N Railway (E&N) that opened Victoria–Nanaimo in 1886. The next year, the E&N extended northwest to Diver Lake.

==== Townsites ====
The initial town developed north of Diver Lake, along the crest of today's Jingle Pot Road. The current Nanaimo-Ladysmith School District Island ConnectEd buildings occupy the property upon which the first Wellington school opened in 1875. By the early 1880s, about 100 houses existed.

In 1890, the company, by then controlled by James Dunsmuir, Robert's son, created a new townsite on the south shore of Long Lake, with numbered streets (now 101–107), and avenues named after important figures or places from the Duke of Wellington's career. Corunna was from the Battle of Corunna, Victoria from Queen Victoria, Wellesley from his surname, and Apsley from Apsley House.

Many buildings surviving the 1899 fire were soon relocated to Ladysmith, sold for removal, or demolished.

=== South Wellington ===
==== Coalmine ====
By 1877, the South Wellington Colliery, owned by Richard D. Chandler of San Francisco, operated between Brannen and Diver lakes, not far outside the southern boundary of the Dunsmuir claim. Acquired by Dunsmuir in 1879 or 1881, the claim became the No. 2 Mine for Wellington. After 1882, production figures were merged. This colliery should not be confused with the one at South Wellington, an entirely different location south of Nanaimo.

Dunsmuir operated No. 5 1884–1900 in the vicinity. Connected to the E&N, the mine was one of the largest. An 1888 explosion killed 77 miners.

On today's Landmark Crescent, Robert (Bob) Carruthers worked by hand 1942–1968 the outcrops of the Loudon mine, the final coalmining on Vancouver Island.

==== Railway ====
A narrow gauge railway ran 6.9 kilometres (4.3 mi) to the company wharf at the southeast corner of Departure Bay. The circuitous track largely covered level ground.

==== Townsite & farm ====
By the early 1880s, about 50 houses existed, but the community infrastructure was at Wellington proper. The 100-acre (40 ha) farm provided feed for the horses and mules used to haul ore cars at the mine site.

=== South toward east ===
Dunsmuir operated No. 3 1880–1899. Connected by a tunnel, No.4 operated 1881–1897, and was used for ventilation and transporting coal. An 1885 explosion in No. 4 killed four miners.

=== East Wellington ===
==== Coalmine ====
Starting in 1864, members of the Westwood family homesteaded several parcels totaling 650-acre (260 ha) between Nanaimo and Wellington. In 1882, Richard Devonshire Chandler acquired the properties (which included subsurface rights), and formed the East Wellington Coal Company. The mine was near today's Maxey Rd/East Wellington Rd intersection. The company built a narrow gauge railway to Departure Bay. Development work was carried out, and significant quantities of coal were produced, but results were comparatively mixed. In 1893 the mine flooded and closed, and the next year the assets were acquired by [James] Dunsmuir, but little further production ensued.

==== Present community ====
The area is largely small rural holdings. The volunteer fire department occupies a modern building.

=== West Wellington ===
Adjacent to Dunsmuir's western boundary, Dennis Jordan of San Francisco, revived some prior work in 1895. Lacking economical transportation, the West Wellington Coal Company operation folded after a few years. In 1907, the Gilfillan Colliery acquired the coal rights, but shuttered the next year. In 1928, the Little Ash Mine ran a small operation for a few years.

=== North Wellington ===
In 1925, Island Collieries, owned by King & Foster Co., opened a small operation, which Canadian Collieries acquired in 1927. Renamed Wellington Extension No. 9, the mine operated intermittently until closing in 1932.

== Later community overview ==
Wellington remained largely rural until World War II, when Nanaimo started to grow, and Wellington became an adjacent bedroom community. In the 1970sq, the Wellington Improvement District amalgamated with the City of Nanaimo, after the populations of Harewood and Nanaimo were allowed to carry the vote. Since the 2000s, Wellington District is often referred to as "North Nanaimo" with only the former town site areas keeping the neighbourhood name of "Wellington".

Today's Wellington neighbourhood is often referred to as Diver Lake, Long Lake, Wellington, Rutherford, or North Nanaimo. Its lakes provide fishing and recreation, while its heritage as an old town has resulted in a diverse composition which includes residential, commercial, and industrial land. It is flanked by Nanaimo North Town Centre (formerly Rutherford Mall), Long Lake, and Country Club Mall to the north, Beban Community Center Complex to the south-east, farms to the west, and the Mostar/Boban industrial area to the northwest.

== Demographics ==
Canada 2006 Census
	Wellington	Nanaimo	British Columbia
Median age	37.1 years	43.3 years	40.8 years
Under 15 years old	21.1%	16%	17%
Over 65 years old	13%	17%	15%

The Wellington neighbourhood population and demographics can be approximated by using the figures for the Diver Lake Census Tract which covers the largest portion of the Wellington neighbourhood. The actual population of the Wellington neighbourhood would be slightly higher if the portions of the neighbourhood not included in the Census Tract were included. Population growth from the 2001 to 2006 was 8.1% vs 7.8% and 5.3% for the City of Nanaimo and Province of British Columbia.

== See also ==
- Wellington station (British Columbia)
