= Nanaimo-Gabriola Island =

Provincial electoral district in British Columbia, Canada

British Columbia electoral district
- Location in Greater Nanaimo

Provincial electoral district
- Legislature: Legislative Assembly of British Columbia
MLA
Sheila Malcolmson
New Democratic
- District created: 2021
- First contested: 2024
- Last contested: 2026

Nanaimo-Gabriola Island is a provincial electoral district for the Legislative Assembly of British Columbia, Canada. Created under the 2021 British Columbia electoral redistribution, the riding was first contested in the 2024 British Columbia general election. It was created out of parts of Nanaimo-North Cowichan and Nanaimo.

== Geography ==
The district consists of the central and southern portions of the city of Nanaimo, as well as unincorporated communities in the Regional District of Nanaimo including Gabriola Island, Cedar, and South Wellington.

== Members of the Legislative Assembly ==
Assembly	Years	Member	Party
Nanaimo-Gabriola Island; Riding created from Nanaimo and Nanaimo-North Cowichan
43rd	2024–2026	Sheila Malcolmson	New Democratic
44th	2026–present	Sheila Malcolmson	New Democratic

== Election results ==
2026 British Columbia general election
Party	Candidate	Votes	%	±%	Expenditures
New Democratic	Sheila Malcolmson	11,079	48.01	-4.74	
Conservative	Mark MacDonald	8,262	35.80	+1.15	
Green	Anna Mary McKenzie	3,692	16.00	+3.40	
Total valid votes		23,033	99.81		
Total rejected ballots		44	0.19		
Turnout					
Registered voters					
New Democratic hold		Swing		-2.95	
Source: Elections BC

2024 British Columbia general election
Party	Candidate	Votes	%	±%	Expenditures
New Democratic	Sheila Malcolmson	14,663	52.75	-0.4	$43,963.12
Conservative	Dale Parker	9,633	34.65	–	$9,857.59
Green	Shirley Lambrecht	3,502	12.60	-16.1	$9,463.26
Total valid votes/expense limit		27,798	99.80	–	$71,700.08
Total rejected ballots		57	0.20	–	
Turnout		27,855	59.96	–	
Registered voters		46,454			
New Democratic notional hold		Swing		-17.5	
Source: Elections BC

2020 provincial election redistributed results
Party	%
New Democratic	53.1
Green	28.7
Liberal	18.2

== See also ==
- List of British Columbia provincial electoral districts
- Canadian provincial electoral districts
