= Lisa Marie Barron =

Canadian politician

Member of Parliament for Nanaimo—Ladysmith
- In office September 20, 2021 – March 23, 2025
- Preceded by: Paul Manly
- Succeeded by: Tamara Kronis

Personal details
- Party: New Democratic Party

Lisa Marie Barron is a Canadian politician from British Columbia. She was elected to represent the riding of Nanaimo—Ladysmith in the House of Commons of Canada in the 2021 Canadian federal election. She is a member of the New Democratic Party. Before she won election at the federal level, Barron was a School District 68 Nanaimo-Ladysmith board trustee and an employee of local public schools.

Prior to her election, Barron worked in a variety of community and social work settings including as a community school coordinator, School District 68 Nanaimo-Ladysmith board trustee, women's centre coordinator, and youth mental health and supportive recovery navigator. In 2023, she ran uncontested and successfully secured the nomination for the NDP representative in the next federal election.

In the 44th Canadian Parliament, Barron served as the NDP Caucus Vice Chair, Critic for Fisheries and Oceans Canada and member of the Parliamentary Standing Committee on Fisheries and Oceans, Critic for Democratic Reform as well as Deputy Critic for Mental Health and Substance Use.

In the 2025 Canadian federal election, she was unseated by Conservative candidate Tamara Kronis.

Barron endorsed Alberta MP Heather McPherson in the 2026 New Democratic Party leadership election.

At the time of the 2025 Canadian federal election, she lived in Nanaimo.

== Policy positions and advocacy ==
=== Fisheries and oceans ===
- Getting open net pen fish farms out of the water
  - Lisa Marie has advocated for a transition away from open net pen salmon farming in Canadian Pacific waters. In May 2022, two years before the Liberal government announced a planned transition to closed-containment facilities, she introduced Bill C-258 which if adopted would have mandated this transition.
- Removing polluting derelict and abandoned vessels from the water
  - As a member of the Parliamentary Standing Committee on Fisheries and Oceans, Lisa Marie initiated a study into the problem of derelict and abandoned vessels in Canadian waters. She also introduced Bill C-344, which if adopted would have enshrined in legislation a national strategy to address the problem.
- Keeping lighthouse keepers stationed along our coasts
  - in 2024, Lisa Marie advocated against the closure of lighthouses on Vancouver Island. The closure was opposed by UCTE (the union representing lighthouse workers), as well as First Nations and municipal representatives who raised concerns about insufficient consultation, and decreased marine safety.

=== Mental health and addictions ===
In June 2022, Barron put forward Motion M-61 National warning label strategy for alcoholic products. This motion called for a national warning label strategy for alcoholic products to better inform Canadians about alcohol being “a major driver of morbidity and mortality in Canada” and a “significant, modifiable contributor to many diseases including cancers.”

Barron has also jointly seconded her colleague Alistair MacGregor’s Bill, advocating for a national strategy on brain injuries as a major consequence of toxic substance use is a traumatic brain injury. For every overdose death, it is estimated there are 20 to 30 non-fatal overdoses, according to Dr. Elizabeth Plant, a Cowichan Valley-based family physician who specializes in addiction treatment, crucially, these non-fatal overdoses — and the related brain injuries — are not tracked or counted in any statistical analysis

Barron has advocated for increased support for individuals facing substance use challenges. Given the severe impacts of the toxic drug crisis, particularly in Nanaimo-Ladysmith, addressing this issue has been a key focus for Barron including jointly seconding, Gord Johns Bill C-216.

=== Electoral reform ===
Barron is an advocate for electoral reform in Canada. As the NDP critic for Democratic Reform, she has actively pushed for changes to the electoral system to ensure it better represents the diverse voices of Canadians. Barron introduced Motion M-86 in June 2023 which called for the creation of a National Citizens' Assembly on Electoral Reform. This assembly would be composed of randomly selected citizens to study and recommend improvements to the current electoral system.

The motion garnered national media attention, was supported by Fair Vote Canada, and received votes in favour by members of every federal party.

== Electoral record ==
2025 Canadian federal election: Nanaimo—Ladysmith
| Party | Candidate | Votes | % | ±% | Expenditures |
|---|---|---|---|---|---|
| Conservative | Tamara Kronis | 26,381 | 35.46 | +8.88 | $145,789.79 |
| Liberal | Michelle Corfield | 20,656 | 27.76 | +14.59 | $76,957.41 |
| New Democratic | Lisa Marie Barron | 13,586 | 18.26 | –11.12 | $128,669.75 |
| Green | Paul Manly | 13,485 | 18.13 | –7.72 | $141,314.20 |
| People's | Stephen Welton | 289 | 0.39 | –4.62 | $687.39 |
| Total valid votes/expense limit | | 74,397 | 99.65 | – | $147,088.21 |
| Total rejected ballots | | 261 | 0.35 | –0.05 | |
| Turnout | | 74,658 | 72.59 | +8.95 | |
| Eligible voters | | 102,856 | | | |
| Conservative notional gain from New Democratic | | Swing | | +10.00 | |
Source: Elections Canada

2021 Canadian federal election: Nanaimo—Ladysmith
| Party | Candidate | Votes | % | ±% | Expenditures |
|---|---|---|---|---|---|
| New Democratic | Lisa Marie Barron | 19,826 | 28.83 | +5.20 | $64,122.25 |
| Conservative | Tamara Kronis | 18,627 | 27.09 | +1.16 | $126,769.27 |
| Green | Paul Manly | 17,640 | 25.65 | –8.92 | $112,978.84 |
| Liberal | Michelle Corfield | 9,314 | 13.54 | +0.00 | $33,839.39 |
| People's | Stephen Welton | 3,358 | 4.88 | +3.42 | $8,293.38 |
| Total valid votes/expense limit | | 68,765 | 99.60 | – | $133,040.69 |
| Total rejected ballots | | 277 | 0.40 | +0.09 | |
| Turnout | | 69,042 | 63.64 | –5.23 | |
| Eligible voters | | 108,490 | | | |
| New Democratic gain from Green | | Swing | | +7.06 | |
Source: Elections Canada
