= Extension, British Columbia =

Coordinates: 49°05′55″N 123°57′25″W

Extension is an unincorporated community near the east coast of southern Vancouver Island, British Columbia. The location off BC Highway 19 is about 107 kilometres (66 mi) by road northwest of Victoria, and 10 kilometres (6 mi) south of Nanaimo.

== Discovery ==
Louis Stark, an African American, lived in today's Colvilletown neighbourhood of South Nanaimo. Many suspected foul play when his body was found at the bottom of a cliff in 1895. One theory claimed he had refused to sell his coal rich land to Dunsmuir coal, desperately seeking new sources to replace its nearly exhausted Wellington mine. Another rumour suggested he was the discoverer of the coal seam on the southern slope of Mt. Benson. However, after the death, his close neighbour Ephraim (Edward) Hodgson claimed the credit and reward for the discovery. Murder charges against Hodgson were dropped.

The Mt. Benson seam proved to be an extension of the Wellington one being worked by Dunsmuir, and the location was initially called Wellington Extension.

== Railway ==
Thwarted in building to Departure Bay, Nanaimo, Dunsmuir in 1897 opened a standard-gauge railway to Oyster Bay, Ladysmith, for loading coal into ships' holds, or for transferring loaded coal cars onto barges.

Underground at the mine, electric locomotives hauled coal cars over the 3-kilometre (2 mi) network. A narrow gauge 1.6-kilometre (1 mi) surface line also operated between pits.

Travel was free for both workers and others on the three-car passenger trains meeting each shift, which provided an opportunity for family members to spend a day in Ladysmith. The coal trains ran during the in-between periods.

In 1931, the underground railway was gutted, and the railway tracks to Ladysmith lifted.

== Coalmine ==
By 1899, the mine worked three shifts and produced 36,287 tonnes (35,714 long tons; 40,000 short tons) annually. A steam hoist hauled the cars up the slag heap for dumping the waste.

In 1901, 16 miners died in a fire beneath ground. The fire still burning over four months later, the mine was flooded to extinguish the flames. After draining, the bodies were recovered. In 1909, 32 died in an explosion of coal dust or by inhaling the resulting toxic gases.

In 1910, Sir William Mackenzie purchased all the Dunsmuir mines through his Canadian Collieries (Dunsmuir). Peak production was 1908–1912, but strikes plagued 1912–1913. In August 1913, strikers destroyed company property and strikebreakers' homes, especially evident in the Chinatown neighbourhood. The BC government declared martial law, sending in troops to restore order and escort strikebreakers to work. Having yielded eight million tons of coal, final closure came in 1931, but unionization in Vancouver Island mines was not restored until 1938.

After 1931, Canadian Collieries leased out small unworked areas around abandoned mines to private contractors. Employing about 35 miners, the Beban mine was one of the larger operations. To the west, this mine operated 1935–1941, extracting 75,000 tonnes (73,815 long tons; 82,673 short tons). Most flooding came from breaching into the old Extension Mine where Beban also sourced its coal. In a 1937 flood, three drowned.

Throughout the 1930s, while surviving the Great Depression, some residents entered up to 91 metres (300 ft) into the Extension workings to extract coal by hand.

== Early community ==
Dunsmuir was fearful of militant labour unrest spreading from nearby Nanaimo. Consequently, he wanted the mine workers to reside at Oyster Bay and commute daily by train. However, hundreds chose to build dwellings at Extension, and the settlement blossomed. In 1900, when the post office opened, the name changed to Extension. In the early 1900s, several stores and the Central, Extension, Overton, Pretoria, and Queen's hotels operated. Special trains carried passengers to Saturday night dances held at either Extension or Ladysmith. After the mine shuttered, the remaining two-storey 21-room hotel closed.

== Later community ==
In 1948, the place was described as "warped, unpainted shanties, many of them with their walls angling crazily and their windows cracked, make Extension…a ghost town – except that people live in the tumbling huts….(or) crumbling old hotels…" Logging sustained the settlement throughout the 1940s and 1950s. Real estate developers soon promoted such locations, which were outside the Nanaimo city boundaries, and taxed at much lower rates.

Today, this bedroom community for Nanaimo comprises a residential area of steadily diminishing vacant lots and modern houses, surrounded by small farms. The general store is gone, but a volunteer fire department remains. The barren towering slag heap lies hidden behind the trees.
