= Sheila Malcolmson =

Canadian politician

Sheila Malcolmson MLA
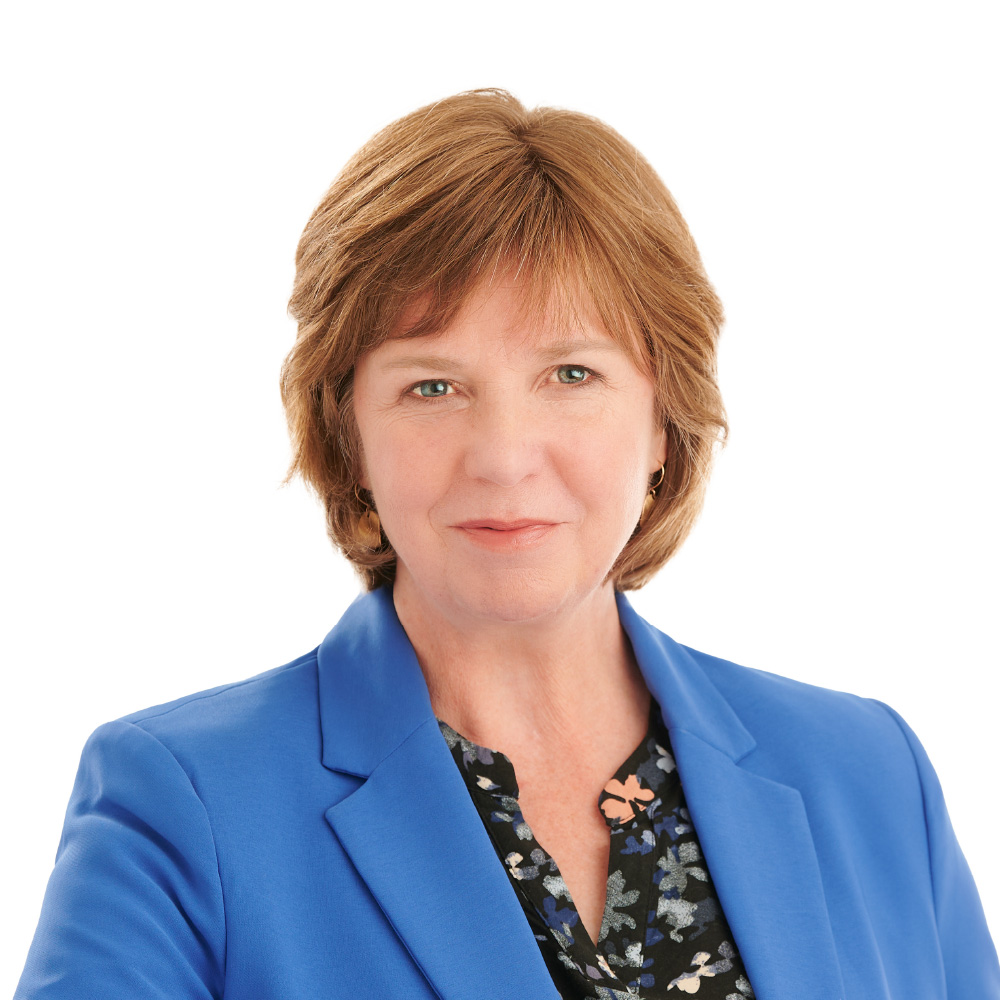
- Campaign portrait, 2024

Minister of Social Development and Poverty Reduction
- In office December 7, 2022 – November 20, 2026
- Premier: David Eby
- Preceded by: Nicholas Simons
- Succeeded by: Claire Rattée

Minister of Mental Health and Addictions
- In office November 26, 2020 – December 7, 2022
- Premier: John Horgan; David Eby
- Preceded by: Judy Darcy
- Succeeded by: Jennifer Whiteside

Member of the British Columbia Legislative Assembly for Nanaimo-Gabriola Island Nanaimo (2019–2024)
- Incumbent
- Assumed office January 30, 2019
- Preceded by: Leonard Krog

Member of Parliament for Nanaimo—Ladysmith
- In office October 19, 2015 – January 2, 2019
- Preceded by: Constituency established
- Succeeded by: Paul Manly

Personal details
- Born: March 26, 1966 (age 60)
- Party: BC NDP (provincial)
- Other political affiliations: New Democratic (federal)

Sheila Malcolmson MLA is a Canadian politician who has served as a member of the Legislative Assembly of British Columbia (MLA) since 2019. A member of the New Democratic Party, she was first elected to represent the electoral district of Nanaimo in a 2019 by-election. In 2024, she was re-elected in the newly formed district of Nanaimo-Gabriola Island. Prior to provincial politics, she served as a member of Parliament (MP) representing the federal riding of Nanaimo—Ladysmith from 2015 to 2019.

Malcolmson won a by-election to succeed Leonard Krog as MLA for Nanaimo on January 30, 2019. Krog, who had held the seat since 2005, resigned after being elected mayor of Nanaimo in the October 20, 2018 municipal elections. Her by-election victory allowed the minority government of NDP Premier John Horgan to maintain its working majority with the Greens in the British Columbia legislature over the opposition Liberals. On July 26, 2019 she was appointed Parliamentary Secretary for the Environment by Premier John Horgan.

Prior to her election to Parliament, she was the chair of the Islands Trust Council, and also served as the trustee for Gabriola Island.

== Electoral history ==
=== Provincial elections ===
2026 British Columbia general election: Nanaimo-Gabriola Island
| Party | Candidate | Votes | % | ±% | Expenditures |
|---|---|---|---|---|---|
| New Democratic | Sheila Malcolmson | 12,168 | 48.18 | | |
| Conservative | Mark MacDonald | 8,970 | 35.52 | | |
| Green | Anna Mary McKenzie | 4,063 | 16.09 | | |
| Total valid votes | | 25,201 | 99.78 | | |
| Total rejected ballots | | 55 | 0.22 | | |
| Turnout | | 25,256 | | | |
| Registered voters | | | | | |
| New Democratic hold | | Swing | | −2.95 | |
Source: Elections BC

2024 British Columbia general election: Nanaimo-Gabriola Island
| Party | Candidate | Votes | % | ±% | Expenditures |
|---|---|---|---|---|---|
| New Democratic | Sheila Malcolmson | 14,663 | 52.75 | -0.4 | $43,963.12 |
| Conservative | Dale Parker | 9,633 | 34.65 | – | $9,857.59 |
| Green | Shirley Lambrecht | 3,502 | 12.60 | -16.1 | $9,463.26 |
| Total valid votes/expense limit | | 27,798 | 99.80 | – | $71,700.08 |
| Total rejected ballots | | 57 | 0.20 | – | |
| Turnout | | 27,855 | 59.96 | – | |
| Registered voters | | 46,454 | | | |
| New Democratic notional hold | | Swing | | -17.5 | |
Source: Elections BC

2020 British Columbia general election: Nanaimo
| Party | Candidate | Votes | % | ±% | Expenditures |
|---|---|---|---|---|---|
| New Democratic | Sheila Malcolmson | 14,334 | 54.49 | +4.57 | $34,570.32 |
| Green | Lia Marie Constance Versaevel | 6,078 | 23.09 | +15.74 | $5,101.61 |
| Liberal | Kathleen Jones | 5,903 | 22.42 | −17.51 | $26,013.13 |
| Total valid votes | | 26,325 | 100.00 | – | |
| Total rejected ballots | | | | | |
| Turnout | | | | | |
| Registered voters | | | | | |
Source: Elections BC

British Columbia provincial by-election, January 30, 2019: Nanaimo
| Party | Candidate | Votes | % | ±% | Expenditures |
|---|---|---|---|---|---|
| New Democratic | Sheila Malcolmson | 12,114 | 49.92 | +3.38 | $50,194 |
| Liberal | Tony Harris | 9,691 | 39.93 | +7.39 | $57,212 |
| Green | Michele Ney | 1,783 | 7.35 | −12.56 | $41,039 |
| Conservative | Justin Greenwood | 491 | 2.02 | – | $1,432 |
| Vancouver Island Party | Robin Mark Richardson | 112 | 0.46 | – | $4,208 |
| Libertarian | Bill Walker | 76 | 0.32 | −0.69 | $246 |
| Total valid votes | | 24,267 | 100.00 | – | |
| Total rejected ballots | | 33 | 0.14 | −0.36 | |
| Turnout | | 24,300 | 52.59 | −8.68 | |
| Registered voters | | 46,210 | | | |
| New Democratic hold | | Swing | | −2.01 | |
Source: Elections BC

=== Federal elections ===
2015 Canadian federal election: Nanaimo—Ladysmith
| Party | Candidate | Votes | % | ±% | Expenditures |
|---|---|---|---|---|---|
| New Democratic | Sheila Malcolmson | 23,651 | 33.20 | –12.06 | $136,135.63 |
| Liberal | Tim Tessier | 16,753 | 23.52 | +16.84 | $21,699.17 |
| Conservative | Mark Allen MacDonald | 16,637 | 23.35 | –17.04 | $132,376.87 |
| Green | Paul Manly | 14,074 | 19.76 | +12.58 | $144,816.61 |
| Marxist–Leninist | Jack East | 126 | 0.18 | – | none listed |
| Total valid votes/expense limit | | 71,241 | 99.78 | – | $236,098.07 |
| Total rejected ballots | | 158 | 0.22 | | |
| Turnout | | 71,399 | 75.00 | | |
| Eligible voters | | 95,200 | | | |
| New Democratic notional hold | | Swing | | –14.45 | |
Source: Elections Canada
