= School District 68 Nanaimo-Ladysmith =

School district in Vancouver Island, British Columbia

Location
- Nanaimo Nanaimo, Ladysmith, Lantzville, Regional District of Nanaimo (RDN) in Vancouver Island Canada

District information
- Superintendent: Ms. Robyn Gray
- Schools: 37
- Budget: CA$195 million (2023-24)

Students and staff
- Students: 15,350
- Staff: 2,200

Other information
- Website: www.sd68.bc.ca

School District 68 Nanaimo-Ladysmith is a school district on central Vancouver Island in British Columbia. This includes the major centres of Nanaimo and Ladysmith. It also covers the surrounding communities and the adjacent northern Gulf Islands.

== History ==
The Nanaimo School district was formed July 30, 1870.

On Tuesday, July 28, 1942 a shortage of teachers in British Columbia, amongst other factors, resulted in two orders-in-council which resulted in one of the largest amalgamations of school districts undertaken by the Ministry of Education. The resulting school district reached from Saltair to Red Gap, but excluded the Ladysmith and Nanaimo Municipal Areas, which kept their own school districts. The new school district was called the "Nanaimo-Ladysmith United Rural School District" and was created by uniting the 19 school districts of: Brechin, Cedar North, Cedar South, Cedar East, Chase River, Departure Bay, Extension, Diamond Crossing, Harewood, Lantzville, Mountain, Nanaimo Bay, Northfield, Oyster, North Oyster, Red Gap, Waterloo, Wellington and South Wellington.

In 1945 the Cameron Report on restructuring the administration of public schools resulted in the government passing the Public Schools Act Amendment Act of 1946 which reduced the number of school districts in British Columbia to 74. This Act further restructured districts in the area.

On April 25, 1972, after years of discussions and financial difficulties, the board of Ladysmith School District (67) voted to merge their district with School District 68 to the North, and School District 65 to the South.

== Schools ==
School	Location	Grades
5 Acres Alternate School (Closed)	Nanaimo	8–10
Aurora Learning Centre	Gabriola	K–10
Bayview Elementary School	Nanaimo	K–7
Brechin Elementary School	Nanaimo	K–7
Cedar Community Secondary School	Cedar (RDN)	8–12
Chase River Elementary School	Nanaimo	K–7
Cilaire Elementary School	Nanaimo	K–7
Cinnabar Valley Elementary School	Nanaimo	K–7
Coal Tyee Elementary School	Nanaimo	K–7
Continuing Ed SD 68	Nanaimo	12
Davis Road Elementary School (Closed)	Ladysmith	K–7
Departure Bay Elementary	Nanaimo	K–7
Dover Bay Secondary School	Nanaimo	8–12
Dufferin Crescent Elementary School (Closed)	Nanaimo	K–7
Fairview Elementary School	Nanaimo	K–7
Forest Park Elementary School	Nanaimo	K–7
Frank J. Ney Elementary School	Nanaimo	K–7
Gabriola Elementary School	Gabriola	K–7
Georgia Avenue Elementary School	Nanaimo	K–7
Hammond Bay Elementary School	Nanaimo	K–7
John Barsby Community School	Nanaimo	8–12
Ladysmith Intermediate School	Ladysmith	4–7
Ladysmith Primary School	Ladysmith	K–3
Ladysmith Secondary School	Ladysmith	8–12
Island ConnectEd (previously Learn@Home)	Nanaimo	K–12
McGirr Elementary School	Nanaimo	K–7
Mount Benson Elementary School	Nanaimo (Closed)	K–7
Mountain View Elementary School	Nanaimo	K–7
Nanaimo Career & Technical Centre	Nanaimo	12
Nanaimo District Secondary School	Nanaimo	8–12
Cedar Elementary (Formally North Cedar Intermediate School)	Cedar (RDN)	K–7
North Oyster Elementary School	Ladysmith	K–7
Northbrook Learning Centre	Nanaimo	11–12
Park Avenue Elementary School	Nanaimo	K–7
Pauline Haarer Elementary School	Nanaimo	K–7
Pleasant Valley Elementary School	Nanaimo	K–7
Quarterway Elementary School	Nanaimo	K–7
Randerson Ridge Elementary School	Nanaimo	K–7
Rock City Elementary School	Nanaimo	K–7
Rutherford Elementary School	Nanaimo (Closed)	K–7
Seaview Elementary School	Lantzville	K–7
South Wellington Elementary School	South Wellington (RDN) (Closed)	K–7
Uplands Park Elementary School	Nanaimo	K–7
Vast Centre School	Nanaimo	11–12
Wellington Secondary School	Nanaimo	8–12
Woodbank Primary School	Cedar (RDN) (Closed)	K–3
Woodlands Secondary School	Nanaimo (Closed)	8–12

== Island ConnectEd 8–12 ==
Island ConnectEd 8–12 is a School District 68 public school that allows students in grades 8–12 throughout the district to learn in a flexible blended-model of online and face-to-face courses. The program has been in operation since 2006 and is a member of the school district's Learning Alternatives Programs.

Island ConnectEd 8–12 is one of the distributed learning schools made possible by Bill 33. As a distributed learning school, Island ConnectEd 8–12 must meet the same curriculum as other schools in the province plus additional regulations. Students in distributed learning classes must still complete mandatory provincial examinations, in grades 10, 11, and 12.

The school building of Island ConnectEd 8–12 and the K–7 portion of the school are currently located at 4355 Jingle Pot Road, Nanaimo, BC.

== School boards ==
1965: Trustees: Chairman: Trustee William A. Lerch

== See also ==
- List of school districts in British Columbia
