= Aspengrove School =

School in Lantzville, British Columbia, Canada

Location
- 7660 Clark Drive; Lantzville, British Columbia, V0R 2H0; Canada; 49.2365°N 124.064°W

Information
- School type: Independent, Junior Kindergarten - Grade 12
- Founded: 2003
- Grades: Pre-K-12
- Language: English, French, Spanish, Chinese
- Colours: Blue, Green, & Gold
- Website: www.aspengroveschool.ca

Aspengrove School is a pre-school to grade 12 in Nanaimo, British Columbia, Canada. The school is an independent, non-denominational, co-educational, and university-preparatory school. Originally, Aspengrove had three houses: Oak, Cedar, and Arbutus. As of September 2026, Aspengrove now has four houses named after four out of five of the founders of Aspengrove School: Ferg (Green), Ciammaichella (Red), Saunders (Blue), and Digney (Yellow).

== History ==
Aspengrove School was founded in 2003 and was originally located at 6553 Portsmouth Road in Nanaimo. At the time of its grand opening 42 students and 8 faculty occupied the 1-acre (4,000 m^{2}) lot. The first principal was Cathy Grunlund. Over the summer of 2006 the school relocated and currently operates on a 40-acre (160,000 m^{2}) parcel. There are approximately 310 enrolled students and 65 faculty offering instruction from Jr. Kindergarten for 3-year-olds to Grade 12. The school is accredited as an International Baccalaureate World School and offers the IB Primary Years, IB Middle Years and IB Diploma programme and received a 10 out of 10 by the IB Organization (IBO) in 2011.

== Legal issues ==
In 2023, the former principal of Aspengrove, Mark Pierotti, received a 15-year ban from teaching after he sent sexually explicit messages to and attempted to meet up with someone he believed to be 15 years old. That person was actually an adult vigilante posing as an underaged youth in order to catch predators in what is known as a "creep catcher" sting operation. After a video of the attempted meet-up and screenshots of their online conversations were posted to a Facebook group in 2022 and the school became aware of the incident, the school fired Pierotti and reported him to the Commissioner for Teacher Regulation, as per the Independent Schools Act.

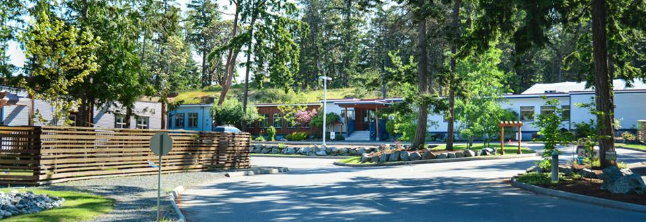
Aspengrove School
