= Ladysmith Secondary School =

Location
- 710 Sixth Avenue, Ladysmith, V9G 1A2

Information
- Other name: LSS
- Motto: Try your best, get better each day, do the right thing, it's the 49er way.
- Established: 1952
- School district: School District 68 Nanaimo-Ladysmith
- Principal: Shelley Gvojich
- Vice Principal: Alistair King
- Grades: 8-12
- Student Council Website: https://sites.google.com/learn68.ca/lssstudentcouncil/home
- Language: English, French, Spanish, Hul'qumi'num
- Colours: White and Navy Blue
- Fight song: Cherry Wine (Hozier song)
- Mascot: Minor Bear
- Team name: 49ers
- Website: https://ls.schools.sd68.bc.ca/

Located in the township of Ladysmith, British Columbia on Vancouver Island, Ladysmith Secondary School is one of six secondary schools in School District No. 68 (Nanaimo-Ladysmith). With a student population of 631 students, the school services grade 8–12. Ladysmith Intermediate and North Oyster Elementary are part of the Ladysmith Secondary School catchment area.
