= Tamara Kronis =

Canadian politician (born 1974)

Tamara Kronis MP

Member of Parliament for Nanaimo—Ladysmith
- Incumbent
- Assumed office April 28, 2025
- Preceded by: Lisa Marie Barron

Personal details
- Born: February 26, 1974 (age 52) Toronto, Ontario, Canada
- Party: Conservative
- Other political affiliations: New Democratic (former)
- Occupation: Politician, lawyer, goldsmith

Tamara Lynne Kronis MP is a Canadian politician, lawyer and goldsmith. She was elected Member of Parliament for Nanaimo—Ladysmith in the 2025 federal election.

== Early life and career ==
Kronis was born in Toronto, Ontario. As a lawyer, Kronis was a trial assistant at the International Criminal Tribunal for Yugoslavia. She has served as advocacy director of Egale Canada, the national LGBTQ+ rights organization.

Kronis is a goldsmith, and founded the jewelry business Studio1098. She moved to Vancouver Island from Ontario. Kronis is Jewish, and is the second Jewish woman elected as a Conservative MP in Canada following Melissa Lantsman in 2021.

== Political career ==
Kronis first contested Nanaimo—Ladysmith in the 2021 federal election, receiving 27.1% of the votes, but narrowly losing to New Democratic Party candidate Lisa Marie Barron with 28.8% of the vote. The election was a close 3-way contest, with Green Party incumbent Paul Manly falling short with 25.7% of the vote.

In the 2025 federal election, Kronis contested the seat, once again facing off against then-incumbent NDP candidate Lisa Marie Barron and Green Party candidate Paul Manly. Kronis was elected, receiving 35.2% of the vote. The Liberal candidate received 27.9% of the vote, with both Manly and Barron receiving slightly over 18%. The results of this election have been regarded by some commentators as a case in support of ranked voting.

== Electoral record ==
2025 Canadian federal election: Nanaimo—Ladysmith
Party	Candidate	Votes	%	±%	Expenditures
Conservative	Tamara Kronis	26,381	35.46	+8.88	$145,789.79
Liberal	Michelle Corfield	20,656	27.76	+14.59	$76,957.41
New Democratic	Lisa Marie Barron	13,586	18.26	–11.12	$128,669.75
Green	Paul Manly	13,485	18.13	–7.72	$141,314.20
People's	Stephen Welton	289	0.39	–4.62	$687.39
Total valid votes/expense limit		74,397	99.65	–	$147,088.21
Total rejected ballots		261	0.35	–0.05	
Turnout		74,658	72.59	+8.95	
Eligible voters		102,856			
Conservative notional gain from New Democratic		Swing		+10.00	
Source: Elections Canada

2021 Canadian federal election: Nanaimo—Ladysmith
Party	Candidate	Votes	%	±%	Expenditures
New Democratic	Lisa Marie Barron	19,826	28.83	+5.20	$64,122.25
Conservative	Tamara Kronis	18,627	27.09	+1.16	$126,769.27
Green	Paul Manly	17,640	25.65	–8.92	$112,978.84
Liberal	Michelle Corfield	9,314	13.54	+0.00	$33,839.39
People's	Stephen Welton	3,358	4.88	+3.42	$8,293.38
Total valid votes/expense limit		68,765	99.60	–	$133,040.69
Total rejected ballots		277	0.40	+0.09	
Turnout		69,042	63.64	–5.23	
Eligible voters		108,490			
New Democratic gain from Green		Swing		+7.06	
Source: Elections Canada
