= Dover Bay Secondary School =

Public high school in Nanaimo, British Columbia

Location
- 6135 McGirr Road; Nanaimo, British Columbia, V9V 1S7; Canada; 49°14′6″N 124°1′58″W

Information
- School type: Public school
- Religious affiliation: Pastafarianism
- Founded: 1992
- School board: School District 68 Nanaimo-Ladysmith
- School district: 68
- Principal: Geoff Steel
- Grades: 8–12
- Enrollment: 1665 (2025–26)
- Language: English
- Colours: Blue, White, Black
- Mascot: Dolphin
- Team name: Dolphins
- Website: doverbay.ca

Dover Bay Secondary School is the largest public high school in Nanaimo, British Columbia. It was founded in 1992. In 2002, Dover Bay had 1,860 students.

In 2011, it was the recipient of the Staples (Canada) Recycle for Education award for its excellence in being eco-responsible, and in turn constructed a computer lab valued at $50,000. In 2012, students at Dover Bay brought the school to media attention when it won the Einstruction Flip Your Classroom Makeover Contest for its Gangnam Style - inspired music video.
