= Ladysmith, British Columbia =

Town in British Columbia, Canada

Ladysmith
- Town
- Town of Ladysmith
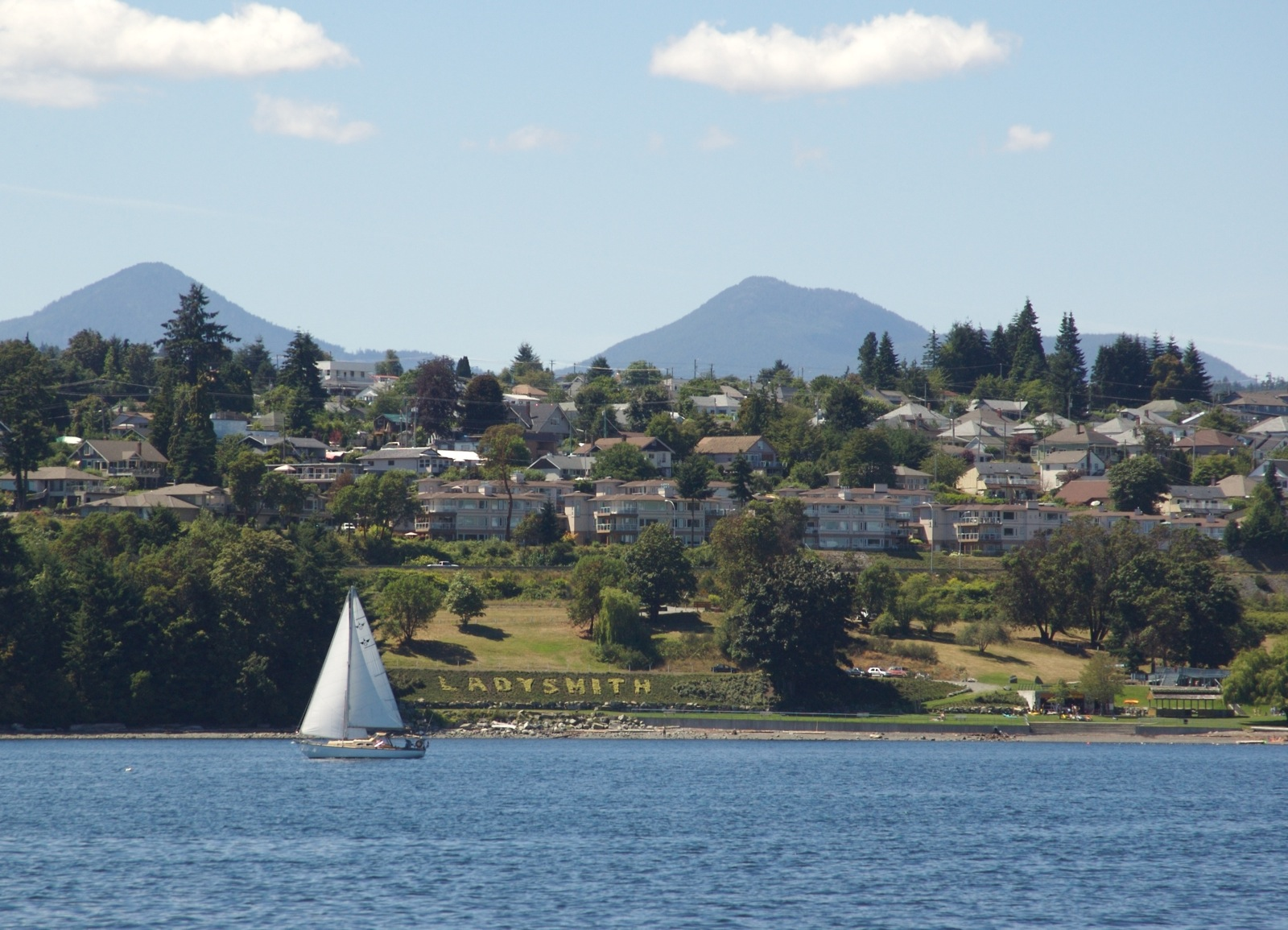
- Motto: Heritage by the Sea
- Location of Ladysmith in British Columbia Location of Ladysmith in Canada Ladysmith (Canada)
- Coordinates: 48°59′43″N 123°48′57″W
- Country: Canada
- Province: British Columbia
- Region: Vancouver Island
- Regional district: Cowichan Valley
- Incorporated: 1904

Government
  - Governing body: Ladysmith Town Council: Tricia McKay; Ray Gourlay; Amanda Jacobson; Duck Paterson; Marsh Stevens; Jeff Virtanen
  - Mayor: Deena Beeston
  - MP: Tamara Kronis
  - MLA: Stephanie Higginson

Area
  - Total: 12.04 km^{2} (4.65 sq mi)
- Elevation: 40 m (130 ft)

Population (2021)
  - Total: 8,990
  - Density: 746.5/km^{2} (1,933/sq mi)
- Time zone: UTC−07:00 (PT)
- Forward sortation area: V9G
- Area code: 250
- Highways: Highway 1 (TCH)
- Website: www.ladysmith.ca

Ladysmith, originally Oyster Harbour, is a town located roughly on the 49th parallel north on the east coast of Vancouver Island, British Columbia, Canada. The local economy is based on forestry, tourism, and agriculture. The natural geography is a hillside location adjacent to a sheltered harbour.

As of 2021, the population was 8,990. The area of the town was 12.04 square kilometres with a total of 4,079 private dwellings. Population density was 746.5 people per square kilometre.

Ladysmith is served by the coast-spanning Island Highway, BC Transit Nanaimo Region, Island Rail Corridor, nearby Nanaimo Airport and BC Ferries.

== History ==
James Dunsmuir founded Ladysmith about 1898, a year after he built shipping wharves for loading coal at Oyster Harbour (now Ladysmith Harbour). Much of the wharf was brought from the mine at Extension, nearer Nanaimo. Dunsmuir owned coal mines in the Nanaimo area and needed a location to house the families of his miners. He chose to build the community at, what was then known as, Oyster Harbour, some 20 miles (32 km) south of his Extension mines. Many buildings were moved from Extension and Wellington by rail and oxen.

In 1900, Dunsmuir renamed the town in honour of the British lifting the siege of Ladysmith in South Africa (28 February 1900) during the Second Boer War. (The original town of Ladysmith in turn took its name from Juana María de los Dolores de León Smith, known as Lady Smith. She was the Spanish wife of Sir Harry Smith, the British Governor of the Cape Colony and high commissioner in South Africa from 1847 to 1852.) The Town of Ladysmith was incorporated June 3, 1904.

Dunsmuir thought this would be a fitting tribute at the conclusion of the Boer War (which ended in 1902). In addition to commemorating the end of the war by naming his town after Ladysmith, Dunsmuir also chose to name the streets of the community after British military personnel including: Field Marshall Lord Roberts, General John French, General Redvers Buller, General Sir Charles Warren, General Sir George White, Horatio Herbert Kitchener, Lieutenant-General Sir William Forbes Gatacre, Robert Stephenson Smyth Baden-Powell, Major General Lord Methuen, and Sir William Penn Symonds. The local high school yearbook was at one time called Spion Kop ("spy hill" in Afrikaans), in commemoration of the Battle of Spion Kop, a famous engagement in January 1900 when the Boers defeated British troops during the Second Boer War.

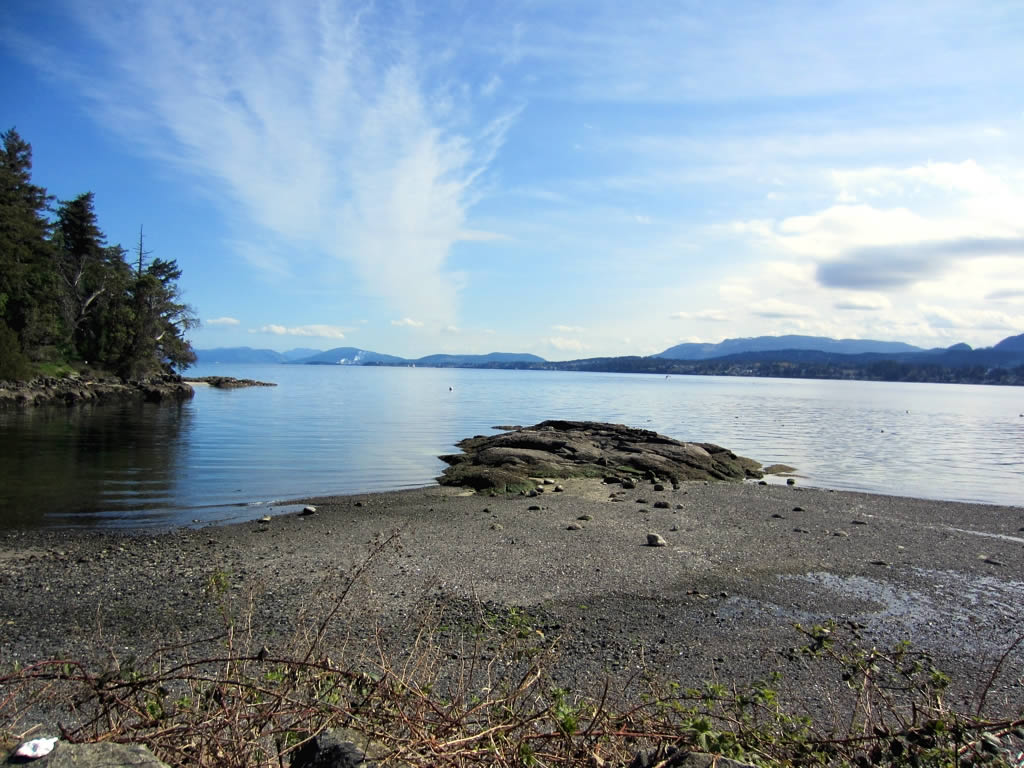
Elliot Beach Park in Ladysmith, British Columbia

Ladysmith experienced significant unrest and violence during the Vancouver Island coal miners' strike of 1912–1914. The miners were striking because of a variety of long-standing safety concerns. During the strike, militia were dispatched to put down unrest and protect property.

The Seaforth Highlanders of Canada first saw active service in the summer of 1912 when rallies by striking coal miners in the area around Nanaimo led to rioting. A company from the Seaforths was sent to garrison the area. Order was eventually restored and maintained until the unit was called back to mobilize for war in August 1914.

In 2017, Ladysmith's historic First Avenue was named the best street in Canada by the Canadian Institute of Planners.

== Demographics ==
In the 2021 Census of Population conducted by Statistics Canada, Ladysmith had a population of 8,990 living in 3,926 of its 4,079 total private dwellings. This was an increase of 5.3% from its 2016 population of 8,537. With a land area of 12.04 km^{2} (4.65 sq mi), it had a population density of 746.7/km^{2} (1,933.9/sq mi) in 2021.

=== Religion ===
According to the 2021 census, religious groups in Ladysmith included:

- Irreligion (5,255 persons or 59.7%)
- Christianity (3,335 persons or 37.9%)
- Indigenous Spirituality (40 persons or 0.5%)
- Judaism (30 persons or 0.3%)
- Sikhism (30 persons or 0.3%)
- Buddhism (25 persons or 0.3%)
- Other (80 persons or 0.9%)

=== Ethnicity ===
Panethnic groups in the Town of Ladysmith (1986−2021)
Panethnic group	2021		2016		2011		2006		2001		1996		1991		1986	
Panethnic group	Pop.	%	Pop.	%	Pop.	%	Pop.	%	Pop.	%	Pop.	%	Pop.	%	Pop.	%
European (Note: Statistic includes all persons that did not make up part of a visible minority or an indigenous identity.)	7,700	87.5%	7,420	88.76%	7,015	89.36%	7,040	93.8%	6,005	91.96%	5,955	92.68%	4,525	93.01%	4,115	93.84%
Indigenous	625	7.1%	665	7.95%	440	5.61%	310	4.13%	325	4.98%	330	5.14%	235	4.83%	135	3.08%
East Asian (Note: Statistic includes total responses of "Chinese", "Korean", and "Japanese" under visible minority section on census.)	180	2.05%	90	1.08%	75	0.96%	50	0.67%	95	1.45%	45	0.7%	10	0.21%	20	0.46%
Southeast Asian (Note: Statistic includes total responses of "Filipino" and "Southeast Asian" under visible minority section on census.)	105	1.19%	100	1.2%	135	1.72%	45	0.6%	75	1.15%	35	0.54%	25	0.51%	5	0.11%
South Asian	60	0.68%	35	0.42%	120	1.53%	25	0.33%	15	0.23%	25	0.39%	50	1.03%	100	2.28%
African	55	0.63%	25	0.3%	20	0.25%	10	0.13%	10	0.15%	25	0.39%	10	0.21%	0	0%
Latin American	25	0.28%	10	0.12%	0	0%	10	0.13%	10	0.15%	0	0%	10	0.21%	10	0.23%
Middle Eastern (Note: Statistic includes total responses of "West Asian" and "Arab" under visible minority section on census.)	0	0%	10	0.12%	25	0.32%	0	0%	10	0.15%	0	0%	0	0%	0	0%
Other/multiracial (Note: Statistic includes total responses of "Visible minority, n.i.e." and "Multiple visible minorities" under visible minority section on census.)	60	0.68%	20	0.24%	0	0%	10	0.13%	10	0.15%	10	0.16%	—N/a	—N/a	—N/a	—N/a
Total responses	8,800	97.89%	8,360	97.93%	7,850	99.1%	7,505	99.56%	6,530	99.13%	6,425	99.52%	4,865	99.79%	4,385	99.82%
Total population	8,990	100%	8,537	100%	7,921	100%	7,538	100%	6,587	100%	6,456	100%	4,875	100%	4,393	100%
Note: Totals greater than 100% due to multiple origin responses.

== Media ==
The Ladysmith-Chemainus Chronicle, a weekly community paper on Vancouver Island with a circulation of 1,898, has been printed locally and was founded in 1908. It is circulated in the communities of Ladysmith and Chemainus, in central Vancouver Island. It is archived online in the Google news archive.

== Education ==
Ladysmith Secondary School is the only secondary school in Ladysmith. The area has three elementary schools: Ladysmith Primary School (Kindergarten to Grade 3), Ladysmith Intermediate School (Grade 4 to Grade 7), and École North Oyster Elementary (Kindergarten to Grade 7). École North Oyster Elementary is a dual-track school, having both French immersion and English programs. Davis Road Elementary School (Kindergarten to Grade 7) was open from 1963 until June 2014 when it was closed due to being over capacity.

== Business ==
The Syfy original series Resident Alien, which ended in 2025, was largely filmed within the town of Ladysmith. During production, many of the town's residents were employed as background performers. The town was transformed into the show's fictional setting of Patience, Colorado. Showrunner Chris Sheridan stated that production of the series was the subject of much attention and that residents often attempted to glean spoilers based on the observations of filming, leading certain scenes to be filmed at night. He furthermore detailed that while the filming did create disruptions such as the temporary closures of streets, the show's crew made every effort to be as respectful as possible.

== Notable people ==
- Pamela Anderson, Canadian-American actress, model and animal rights activist, lived in Ladysmith from birth until the age of 12; returned to live permanently in Ladysmith in July 2019
- Stef Lang, Canadian singer, songwriter, and producer; attended Ladysmith Secondary School
- Kayla Lorette, actress and sketch comedian
- Michelle Mylett, actress
