= 2022 Green Party of Canada leadership election =

- November 19, 2022
- Turnout: 36% (▼32.8pp)
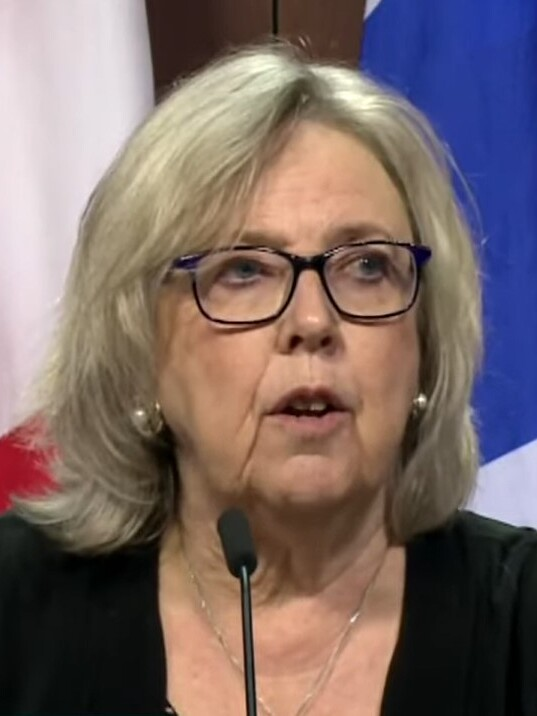

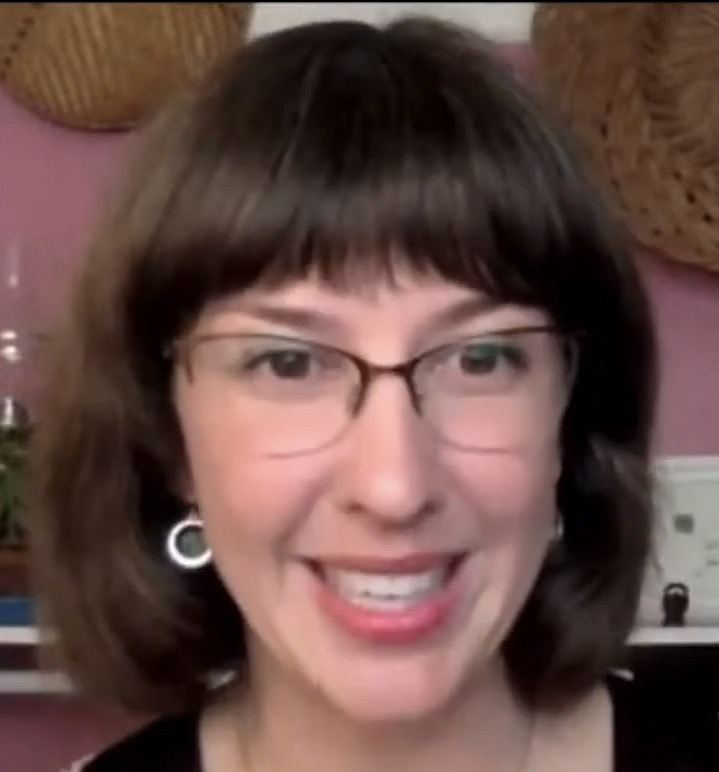

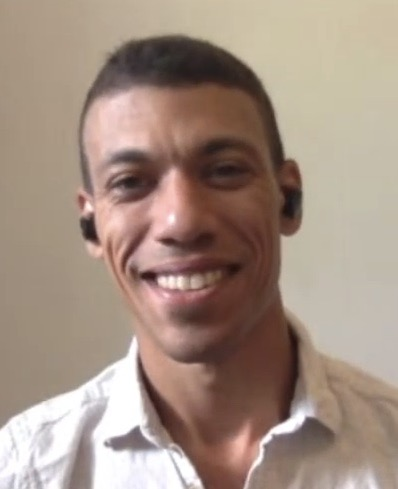

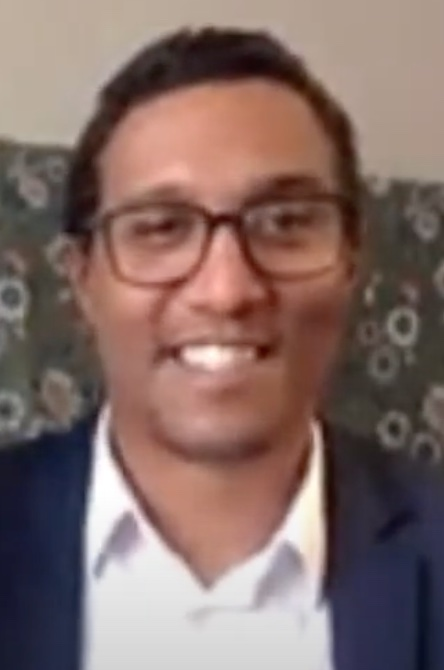

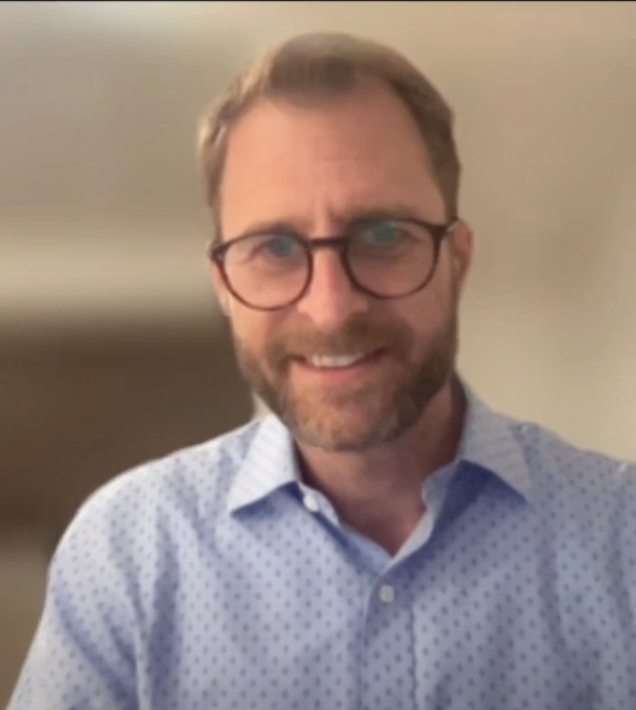

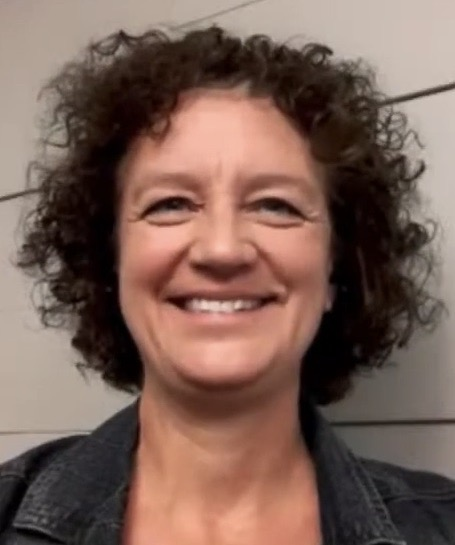
Candidate	Elizabeth May	Anna Keenan	Jonathan Pedneault
Running mate	Jonathan Pedneault	Chad Walcott	Elizabeth May
Round 6	4,666 (58.11%)	3,089 (38.47%)	Eliminated
Round 1	3,736 (46.53%)	2,034 (25.33%)	775 (9.65%)
Candidate	Chad Walcott	Simon Gnocchini-Messier	Sarah Gabrielle Baron
Running mate	Anna Keenan	N/A	N/A
Round 6	Eliminated	Eliminated	Eliminated
Round 1	547 (6.81%)	399 (4.97%)	378 (4.71%)
Leader before election
Amita Kuttner (interim)
Annamie Paul (elected)
Elected Leader
Elizabeth May

2022 Green Party leadership election
- Date: November 19
- Convention: The Westin Hotel, Ottawa
- Resigning leader: Annamie Paul
- Won by: Elizabeth May
- Candidates: 6 + NOTA
- Entrance fee: $1,000

The Green Party of Canada held a leadership election from November 12 to November 19, 2022. It elected a new leader to replace Annamie Paul, who had resigned following the 2021 Canadian federal election.

Notably, four of the six candidates approved to run in this leadership race campaigned as part of joint tickets, promising to appoint the losing member of their ticket as a deputy or co-leader. As co-leadership was not recognized in the Green Party's constitution at the time of the leadership election, a move to shared leadership required approval from the Green Party. Former party leader Elizabeth May won the election, after campaigning as part of a joint ticket with Jonathan Pedneault; as co-leadership was not formally recognized in the party's constitution, Pedneault became Deputy Leader while the two sought to amend the party constitution. However, the proposed constitutional change was not approved due to internal disagreement and delay. On July 9, 2024, Jonathan Pedneault resigned as deputy leader, citing personal reasons. He would return in February 2025, following the ratification of the co-leadership model by party members.

== Rules ==
To be eligible, a candidate:

- must complete a leadership contest application;
- must have been a member in good standing for at least three months at the end of the application period, unless their employment prohibited them from membership in a political party;
- must be eligible for election to the House of Commons; have no debt owed to the party;
- have no open litigation against the party;
- must be solvent;
- must not have participated in the writing of the campaign rules;
- must be "confirmed to be proficient in speaking and understanding speech in both official languages such that they can carry out their duties in both languages", unless an Indigenous applicant;
- must have "not demonstrated a pattern, or committed a single egregious act, within reasonable recency, of evidenced and documented violations of the GPC members’ code of conduct, such as inciting or committing violence, racism or abuse";
- has not engaged in a pattern of public advocacy of "positions contrary to the Global Green Principles".

If there are more than five contestants, the first round will end with a preliminary vote by members. The top four contestants will then continue into the second round. On September 28, 2022, it was announced that there would only be a single round of voting. All Party members age 14 and older were eligible to vote.

== History ==
On September 20, 2021, the 2021 Canadian federal election was held. The election was the Green Party's worst showing since 2000 and included Paul's defeat in her own riding of Toronto Centre, where she placed fourth. As the Green Party's constitution stipulate that leaders must face a leadership review within six months of an election, and following speculation on her political future, Paul announced on September 7 that she would be resigning as leader. By October 27, Paul had still not formally resigned, due to on-going exit negotiations, and members began voting in the leadership review, set to conclude on November 25. On November 10, 2021, Paul formally resigned as leader. Her resignation officially took effect on November 14, 2021, when it was accepted by the party's federal council.

Amita Kuttner was appointed interim leader on November 24, 2021. The party's constitution requires a leadership race begin within six months of the appointment of an interim leader, and conclude within two years of their appointment. In December 2021, Kuttner said they believed there should be a "longer period before launching a permanent leadership contest, and then a short leadership race."

== Timeline ==
=== 2021 ===
- September 20 – 2021 Canadian federal election was held, with the party winning two seats, but Annamie Paul failed to win her riding of Toronto Centre.
- September 27 – Annamie Paul announced she will begin the process of resigning as leader.
- October 27 – Voting started in a leadership review.
- November 10 – Paul announced her pending resignation (effective November 14) and ended her membership with the party. Several days later, her resignation was accepted by the Green Party's federal council and took effect. The party also cancelled the leadership review.
- November 14 – Paul resigns as leader.
- November 15–19 – The party made an open call for applicants for the role of interim leader. Twenty applications were received.
- November 24 – Amita Kuttner was appointed interim leader.

=== 2022 ===
- May 24 – The leadership election officially began, pursuant to the party's constitution.
- June 28 – Leadership contest rules were announced. The application period for leadership contestants opened.
- August 5 – Application period for leadership candidates ends.
- August 31 – GPC announces all leadership contestants, first round of campaign begins.
- September 14 – Original deadline to become a party member and be eligible to vote in the first round.
- September 28 — Due to organizational problems, the federal council decided to reduce the leadership election to a single round of voting to run from November 12 to November 19. The original first round of voting would have taken place from October 7 to October 14.
- October 19 – Deadline to become a party member and be eligible to vote.
- November 12 – Voting begins.
- November 19 – Voting ends at 3:30 p.m. EST, results announced at 8 p.m. EST.

== Candidates ==
=== Sarah Gabrielle Baron ===
Sarah Gabrielle Baron is a teacher, businesswoman and creative author residing on Manitoulin Island, Ontario. She was the candidate for Algoma—Manitoulin—Kapuskasing in 2006, and an independent candidate for Durham in 2021, finishing in fifth place out of seven candidates for the seat and receiving 0.37% of the vote. She called for a moratorium on new nuclear development.

Campaign website: www.sarahgabriellebaron.ca

=== Simon Gnocchini-Messier ===
Simon Gnocchini-Messier is a senior teacher at the Department of National Defense. He was the candidate for Hull—Aylmer in 2021, finishing in sixth place out of nine candidates for the seat with 2.8% of the vote. He said that he would work with municipalities to make federally owned land in urban areas available for cooperative farming, dedicate space for food production in public parks larger than two acres, and include vertical farming in new residential developments greater than 100 units. He also called for an increase in hydroelectricity production, in part to support electrification of public transit. He proposed limiting immigration to 300,000 people per year to achieve environmentally sustainable population growth.

Campaign website: www.simongmessier.ca/en

=== Anna Keenan and Chad Walcott ===
Anna Keenan and Chad Walcott ran on a joint ticket with a shared platform.

Anna Keenan, 36, was the candidate for Malpeque in 2019 and 2021, the latter of which she finished third out of five candidates with 14.32% of the vote. Keenan is also currently the Green Party critic for electoral reform. Keenan has degrees in physics and economics from the University of Queensland, Australia, and has worked for 15 years as a campaigner for renewable energy, a labour organizer, and a community organizer within organizations such as Greenpeace International and 350.org. She currently lives in PEI, where she led the provincial Greens through an expansion and professionalization which led to them becoming PEI's Official Opposition in 2019. She has run twice as a federal candidate and has been in the top six Green candidates nationwide both times. Since 2019 she is the Green Party of Canada's Democratic Institutions Critic. She is believed to be the first person from Prince Edward Island to run for the leadership of a major political party.

Chad Walcott, 34, was the candidate for Notre-Dame-de-Grâce in the 2018 Quebec provincial election, finishing fourth out of nine candidates with 6.67% of the vote. Walcott was born in Montreal and received a Bachelor of Political Science from Concordia University. He has worked 10 years in politics, community engagement and social development, including 2 ½ years as a fundraiser for the Jewish General Hospital Foundation. He was involved in student mobilization at Concordia, especially during the 2011-2012 Maple Spring when he organized and led the largest student protest in Concordia's history (for which he received an award for Outstanding Contribution to Student Life). In 2018, Walcott ran for the Green Party of Quebec and won that party's second-highest result.

As part of Keenan and Walcott's platform they supported Canada moving towards implementing a universal basic income (UBI). They believe the Green Party should adopt a co-leadership model. Other policies they ran on included a four-day work week for federal workers, a ban on fossil fuel projects and the creation of a national electric inter-city bus service.

Campaign website: www.keenanwalcott.ca

=== Elizabeth May and Jonathan Pedneault ===
Elizabeth May, 68, and Jonathan Pedneault, 32, ran on a joint ticket with a shared platform. They support moving the Green Party to a co-leadership model.

Elizabeth May, MP for Saanich—Gulf Islands since 2011, Green Party leader (2006–2019), and parliamentary leader since 2019. May previously said she would not return as permanent nor interim leader, but when asked in July 2022, she did not deny considering a run.

Jonathan Pedneault is a human rights activist and co-director of the 2008 documentary Refuge: A Film About Darfur from Montreal, Quebec.

Campaign websites: elizabethmay.ca and www.jonathanpedneault.ca

=== Candidates who withdrew or failed to qualify ===
- Owen Bradley, candidate for Kitchener—Conestoga in 2021
- Nasser Dean Chalifoux, candidate for Desnethé—Missinippi—Churchill River in 2021.
- Najib Jutt, political advisor and strategist. His candidacy was rejected after he refused to take a French test.
- Jenn Kang, former interim Deputy Leader of the Green Party of Nova Scotia.
- Alex Tyrrell, leader of the Green Party of Quebec. Tyrrell was expelled from the federal Green Party while preparing to launch a leadership bid.
- Shodja Ziaian, professor at York University, in Toronto, Ontario. He had run previously in Don Valley East in 1997 with the New Democratic Party and in Willowdale in 2019 as an independent.

=== Declined ===
- Denis Blanchette, New Democratic MP for Louis-Hébert (2011–2015).
- Dalila Elhak, businesswoman from Limoilou, Quebec. She has run previously as a federal candidate for Beauport—Limoilou in 2015, 2019, and 2021.
- Courtney Howard, emergency room physician and third-place finisher in the 2020 leadership election.
- Naomi Hunter, leader of the Saskatchewan Green Party.
- Amita Kuttner, Interim leader (2021–2022), astrophysicist, sixth-place finisher in the 2020 leadership election, and candidate for Burnaby North—Seymour in 2019.
- Dimitri Lascaris, runner-up in the 2020 leadership election, lawyer and activist who resides in Montreal, Quebec.
- David Merner, fifth-place finisher in the 2020 leadership election.
- Paul Manly, MP for Nanaimo—Ladysmith (2019–2021).
- Mike Morrice, MP for Kitchener Centre (2021–2025). He was the first Green MP to be elected in Ontario. Despite being encouraged to run by former leader Elizabeth May, he ruled himself out of the leadership election in order to concentrate on representing his constituents.
- Glen Murray, former mayor of Winnipeg, former Ontario Cabinet Minister and fourth-place finisher in the 2020 leadership election. (Ran for mayor of Winnipeg.)

== Results ==
Candidate	Round 1		Round 2		Round 3		Round 4		Round 5		Round 6	
Candidate	Votes	%	Votes	%	Votes	%	Votes	%	Votes	%	Votes	%
Elizabeth May	3,736	46.53	3,746	46.65	3,830	47.70	3,953	49.23	4,008	49.91	4,666	58.11
Anna Keenan	2,034	25.33	2,048	25.50	2,158	26.87	2,303	28.68	2,819	35.11	3,089	38.47
Jonathan Pedneault	775	9.65	780	9.71	817	10.17	893	11.12	969	12.07	Eliminated	
Chad Walcott	547	6.81	556	6.92	589	7.33	665	8.28	Eliminated			
Simon Gnocchini-Messier	399	4.97	404	5.03	487	6.06	Eliminated					
Sarah Gabrielle Baron	378	4.71	396	4.93	Eliminated							
None of these options	161	2.00	Eliminated									
Exhausted Votes	0	0.00	100	1.25	149	1.86	216	2.69	234	2.91	275	3.42
Total	8,030	100.00	8,030	100.00	8,030	100.00	8,030	100.00	8,030	100.00	8,030	100.00

% of Vote Share by Round

== Opinion polling ==
A poll of 218 Green party supporters conducted March 22 to April 4, 2022, by Probit Inc. found that provincial party leaders Sonia Furstenau (27%) and Mike Schreiner (23%) led in support, were they to run. Several other people who were noted in media sources as potential candidates, but who declined to run or failed to qualify, were included in the survey options, including Paul Manly (12%), Dimitri Lascaris (8%), Alex Tyrrell (7%) and Naomi Hunter (3%).

Another poll of 281 Canadians was done by Probit Inc. and posted on November 18, 2022. The poll showed the May/Pedneault ticket at 72%, the Keenan/Walcott ticket at 16%, Baron at 7%, and Gnocchini-Messier at 6%.

== See also ==
- Green Party of Canada leadership elections
- 2022 Conservative Party of Canada leadership election
