= Green Party of Canada leadership elections =

Green Party of Canada leadership elections, more commonly known as leadership conventions, are the process by which the Green Party of Canada elects its leader.

Ballots are always mailed out in advance to all Green Party of Canada "members in good standing" - allowing the option of voting by mail to all party members who do not wish to attend the convention in person.

The party uses an instant-runoff voting (IRV) ballot system for the election of its leader and councillors and a standard yes-or-no ballot for voting on constitutional amendments.

== Leadership conventions ==
=== 2000 ===
- 2000 Ottawa (University of Ottawa), Joan Russow re-elected (resigned in January 2001, Chris Bradshaw elected by national council meeting in February 2001 as interim leader).

=== 2002 ===
- 2002 Montreal (Francophone institute for the blind), no member nominated for leader; Chris Bradshaw chosen to continue on an interim basis.

=== 2003 ===
- February 14, 2003, Jim Harris elected.

Candidate	Votes	
Candidate	#	%
Jim Harris	437	81.38
John Grogan	76	14.15
Jason Crummey	24	4.47
Spoiled Ballots	0	0.00
Total	537	100.0%

=== 2004 ===
- 2004 Calgary (Kiwanis camp in foothills), Jim Harris re-elected (first elected by mail ballot 6 months after the Montreal convention).

Candidate	Votes	
Candidate	#	%
Jim Harris	524	55.16
Tom Manley	352	37.05
John Grogan	74	7.79
Spoiled Ballots	0	0.00
Total	950	100.0%

=== 2006 ===
Held August 24–27, 2006 in Ottawa, Ontario using a One Member One Vote system. On April 24, 2006, incumbent party leader Jim Harris announced he would not be running for re-election. The race was won by Elizabeth May on August 26, 2006.

Candidate	Votes	
Candidate	#	%
Elizabeth May	2,145	65.34
David Chernushenko	1,096	33.38
Jim Fannon	29	0.88
None of the above	13	0.40
Total	3,283	100.0%

=== 2020 ===
Held October 3, 2020, in Ottawa, Ontario using a one member, one vote preferential ballot with a none of the above option. Annamie Paul, an activist and lawyer from Toronto, won the election on the eighth round of voting. Her win was described as a win for "the more centrist camp".

Results by round
Candidate		1st round		2nd round		3rd round		4th round		5th round		6th round		7th round		8th round	
Image	Name	Votes cast	%	Votes cast	%	Votes cast	%	Votes cast	%	Votes cast	%	Votes cast	%	Votes cast	%	Votes cast	%
	Annamie Paul	6,242	26.14%	6,242	26.16%	6,305	26.24%	6,478	27.23%	6,952	29.44%	7,614	32.52%	8,862	38.52%	12,090	54.53%
	Dimitri Lascaris	5,768	24.15%	5,773	24.20%	5,813	24.40%	6,586	27.69%	7,050	29.86%	7,551	32.25%	8,340	36.22%	10,081	45.47%
	Courtney Howard	3,285	13.76%	3,285	13.77%	3,348	14.05%	3,404	14.31%	3,762	15.93%	4,523	19.32%	5,824	25.29%	Eliminated	
	Glen Murray	2,745	11.50%	2,746	11.51%	2,821	11.84%	2,846	11.96%	2,992	12.67%	3,725	15.91%	Eliminated			
	David Merner	2,636	11.04%	2,636	11.05%	2,697	11.32%	2,727	11.46%	2,856	12.10%	Eliminated					
	Amita Kuttner	1,468	6.15%	1,470	6.16%	1,486	6.24%	1,748	7.35%	Eliminated							
	Meryam Haddad	1,345	5.63%	1,346	5.64%	1,358	5.70%	Eliminated									
	Andrew West	352	1.47%	356	1.49%	Eliminated											
	None Of The Above	36	0.15%	Eliminated													
Total		23,877	100%	23,854	100%	23,828	100%	23,788	100%	23,612	100%	23,413	100%	23,026	100%	22,171	100%

=== 2022 ===
Annamie Paul resigned on November 14, 2021, several weeks after the 2021 Canadian federal election. Held November 19, 2022, in Ottawa, Ontario using a one member, one vote preferential ballot with a none of the above option. Saanich—Gulf Islands MP and former Green Party leader Elizabeth May won the election, after campaigning as part of a joint ticket with Jonathan Pedneault; as co-leadership is not formally recognized in the party’s constitution, Pedneault will become Deputy Leader while the two seek to amend the party constitution.

Candidate	Round 1		Round 2		Round 3		Round 4		Round 5		Round 6	
Candidate	Votes	%	Votes	%	Votes	%	Votes	%	Votes	%	Votes	%
Elizabeth May	3,736	46.53	3,746	47.24	3,830	48.6	3,953	50.58	4,008	51.41	4,666	60.17
Anna Keenan	2,034	25.33	2,048	25.83	2,158	27.38	2,303	29.47	2,819	36.16	3,089	39.83
Jonathan Pedneault	775	9.65	780	9.84	817	10.37	893	11.43	969	12.43	Eliminated	
Chad Walcott	547	6.81	556	7.01	589	7.47	665	8.51	Eliminated			
Simon Gnocchini-Messier	399	4.97	404	5.09	487	6.18	Eliminated					
Sarah Gabrielle Baron	378	4.71	396	4.99	Eliminated							
None of these options	161	2.00	Eliminated									
Total		100.00		100.00		100.00		100.00		100.00		100.00

=== 2025 ===
On February 4, 2025, Jonathan Pedneault's intention to serve as co-leader, pending election by party membership, which was approved in a landslide. However, while the vote was approved by 89.4% of the 2,990 Green Party of Canada members who voted, 71% of the total 10,301 Green Party of Canada members who were eligible to cast a ballot did not vote.

2025 Green Party of Canada co-leadership election results
Candidate	Votes	Percentage
Elizabeth May and Jonathan Pedneault	2,674	89.4%
Abstention	316	10.6%
Total	2,990	100%

=== 2026 ===
On August 19, 2025, Elizabeth May announced her intention to resign as party leader. Former Green MP Mike Morrice was elected party leader on November 14.

2026 Green Party of Canada leadership election results
Candidate	Votes	Percentage
Mike Morrice	3,318	96.6%
None of the above	117	3.4%
Total	3,435	100%

== Leaders of the Green Party of Canada ==
- Trevor Hancock (1983–1984)
- Seymour Trieger (1984–1988)
- Kathryn Cholette (1988–1990)
- Chris Lea (1990–1996)
- Wendy Priesnitz (1996–1997)
- Harry Garfinkle (interim) (1997)
- Joan Russow (1997–2001)
- Chris Bradshaw (interim) (2001–2003)
- Jim Harris (2003–2006)
- Elizabeth May (2006–2019)
- Jo-Ann Roberts (interim) (2019–2020)
- Annamie Paul (2020–2021)
- Amita Kuttner (interim) (2021–2022)
- Elizabeth May (2022–2026)
- Jonathan Pedneault, co-leader with May (2025)
- Mike Morrice (2026–present)
