= Stuart Parker (politician) =

Canadian politician

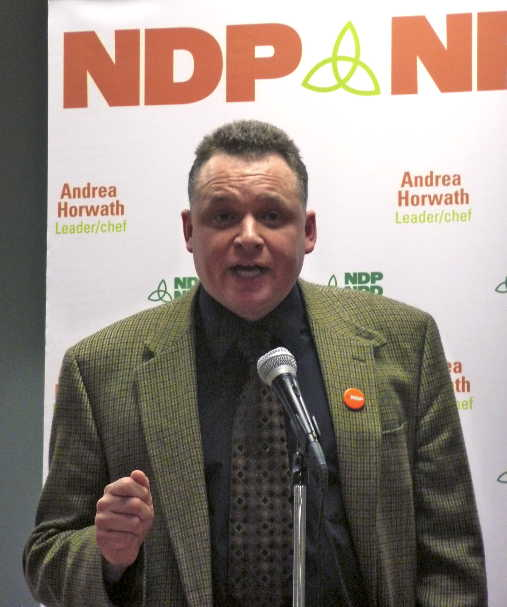
- Stuart Parker giving his nomination speech, August 24, 2009

Leader of the Green Party of British Columbia
- In office 1993–2000
- Preceded by: N/A (Note: Three speakers, instead of a single leader, were elected between 1985 and 1992.)
- Succeeded by: Tom Hetherington (interim); Adriane Carr

Personal details
- Born: 1972 (age 53–54) Vancouver, British Columbia
- Party: BC Conservative Party (2024—present)
- Other political affiliations: BC Ecosocialists (2020); New Democratic Party (2001–2018); Green Party of Canada (1993–2000); BC Greens (1993–2000)
- Occupation: University Lecturer

Stuart Parker (born 1972) is a Canadian politician who was the acting leader of the BC Ecosocialists party in 2020 and was the leader of the Green Party in British Columbia, Canada, from 1993 to 2000. In 2009, during the Ontario by-election to replace MPP Michael Bryant, he unsuccessfully sought the Ontario New Democratic Party nomination for the St. Paul's provincial riding. More recently, after briefly living in Tanzania, he joined the BC Conservative Party in 2024 and worked as a party staffer.

== Green Party activism ==
Prior to winning the party's leadership at the age of 21, he had been the founder and spokesperson of the party's youth wing, the Young Greens from 1988 to 1992 and was best known for coordinating the group's successful national campaign against McDonald's Restaurants' use of ozone-destroying foam packaging. Parker and the Young Greens received substantial credit from Canada's national media in 1990 when the restaurant giant abandoned the use of chlorofluorocarbon-based foam. The group's continued campaign against the use of CFCs in foam packaging led to CKF Incorporated, Canada's largest manufacturer of CFC-based foam, abandoning the use of CFCs in manufacturing in 1993.

Parker managed to take the party from a tiny group of 59 in 1992 to a party that was only four candidates short of a full slate in the 1996 provincial election. He built links to poverty activists and labour groups. During his leadership, the party's standing in public opinion polls rose from 1% to 11%. During his time as the party leader, Parker was arrested in anti-clearcutting blockades in Clayoquot Sound in 1993 and the Slocan Valley in 1997.

Reversing his earlier position, he negotiated agreements with the municipal affiliates of the then-incumbent British Columbia New Democratic Party (NDP) provincial government and the labour councils of Vancouver and Victoria in 1998 and 1999, resulting in the first and the only Red-Green coalitions in Canadian history in BC's 1999 municipal elections. As part of these coalitions, the Greens won their first-ever municipal seats in Canadian cities.

Ultimately, his focus on building a broadly left-wing green party in BC brought criticism from some members of the environmental movement in the province. Those people played a significant role in the efforts that eventually led to Parker's defeat at the party's March 2000 convention - after previous unsuccessful attempts to unseat him in 1998 and 1999.

At the time of Parker's defeat, his supporters in the party were in negotiations with the NDP over a potential provincial electoral alliance. His successor, Adriane Carr, cancelled these negotiations.

== NDP and electoral reform activism ==
Parker's departure from the party came as the Greens were perceived to be moving to the political right. He subsequently worked with the NDP in the 2001 provincial election and with the federal New Democratic Party in the 2004 federal election.

Upon leaving the Green Party, Parker initially worked as a lobbyist for Mike Geoghegan. Despite leaving the Greens and joining the NDP, he remained a strong advocate for electoral reform, specifically proportional representation. A co-founder of the BC Electoral Change Coalition in 1997, he served on the board of Fair Voting BC (2000–2002, 2006–2009) and on the board of Fair Vote Canada (2005–2007). He served as a spokesperson for the "YES" campaign in the 2005 and 2009 BC referendums on voting reform.

Living in Ontario in 2009, he sought the NDP nomination for the provincial by-election in the St. Paul's electoral district, but was defeated by lawyer Julian Heller.

Following the defeat, Parker was encouraged by the NDP's national office and the board of the St. Paul's federal riding association to seek the party's federal nomination. However, in March 2010, after initially being approved by the party's vetting process the previous November, he was informed by head office staff that he was not only disqualified from running in St. Paul's, but barred from running for a federal NDP nomination anywhere in Canada. Party officials objected to four posts he had made to his personal Facebook page in the intervening months, particularly one in which he urged Toronto NDP supporters to back the NDP candidate for mayor in the wake of a sex scandal.

In March 2018, Stuart Parker resigned from the NDP over the provincial government's subsidies to transnational fossil fuel producers.

== Surrey municipal politics ==
Parker organized reading groups through the Los Altos Institute, which describes itself as a "left-wing think tank", and Los Altos began a reading group in Surrey, BC in 2016. From that Surrey group, in April 2018, Parker announced the creation of a civic party in the city of Surrey called Proudly Surrey. The party ran candidates for City Council, including Parker, a candidate for mayor, Dr. Pauline Greaves, and candidates for Surrey School Board in the October 20, 2018, municipal election.

== Return to the Greens and Ecosocialist Party ==
On June 2, 2020, Parker rejoined the party and endorsed Dimitri Lascaris in the leadership election.

Parker was a founder of the BC Ecosocialists and was its acting leader, as well as a prospective candidate in the 2020 British Columbia general election. He resigned as both after allegations he made transphobic comments.

The BC Ecosocialists' stated aims included steering the province to a greener society and fighting discrimination against the First Nations and immigrants. Formed in 2019, the 2020 British Columbia general election was expected to be its first.

== Move to conservatism ==
Following Parker's expulsion from the Ecosocialist Party due to his statements on transgender issues, Parker moved to the right as a result of the backlash he faced. By 2023, he was identifying himself as a conservative and "anti-woke," joining the BC Conservative Party in 2024 and working as a party staffer.

== Personal ==
The son of Valerie Jerome and nephew of Harry Jerome, Parker was the first leader of a registered political party in BC of African descent and gave the keynote speech to the opening ceremony of the province's Black History Month in 1994.

He is currently based in the Vancouver area after doing a travel-intensive postdoctoral fellowship from the Social Sciences and Humanities Research Council of Canada on the religions of indigenous peoples of the Americas and Polynesia. He works as a university lecturer at both Simon Fraser University and the British Columbia Institute of Technology.

== Election results ==
Election	Type	Total votes	% of popular vote	Place
Vancouver-Fraserview 1991	Provincial General	141	0.8%	4th
Vancouver City 1992	Municipal Byelection	?	2.1%	?
Vancouver-Quilchena 1994	Provincial Byelection	395	3.6%	4th
Vancouver-Little Mountain 1996	Provincial General	714	3.0%	4th
Vancouver Parks Board 1996	Municipal General	18120	23% (3.2%)^{1}	15th
Vancouver East 1997	Federal General	1221	3.4%	4th
Surrey-White Rock 1997	Provincial Byelection	910	4.5%	4th
Parksville-Qualicum 1998	Provincial Byelection	458	1.7%	5th
Surrey City 2018	Municipal General	8609	8.9% (1.1%)^{1}	25th

1. Vancouver Parks Board and Surrey City Council are chosen in a citywide (at-large) election in which seven candidates are elected. Although Parker received 3.2% of the total votes, approximately 23% of electors voted for him and in Surrey, he received the support of just shy of 9% of voters.

== Notes ==
Preceded by Adriane Carr	Green Party of BC leaders 1993-2000	Succeeded by Tom Hetherington
