= Global Climate and Health Alliance =

- Abbreviation: GCHA
- Formation: 2011
- Founded at: Durban, South Africa
- Website: climateandhealthalliance.org

The Global Climate and Health Alliance (GCHA) is an organisation that mobilises the health community worldwide to drive action to tackle climate change and protect public health. GCHA's 300+ members are health, climate and development organisations from around the world.

The organisation was formed in 2011 in Durban, South Africa. In 2015 GCHA gathered signatures from over 1,700 health organisations and 8,200 hospitals and health facilities representing 13 million health professionals in a collective agreement on the need to address climate change.

The Global Climate and Health Alliance co-chairs the World Health Organization's Civil Society Working Group for Action on Climate Change and Health.

The Board of Directors is currently chaired by Dr Courtney Howard.
