= Courtney Howard =

Canadian physician (born 1978)

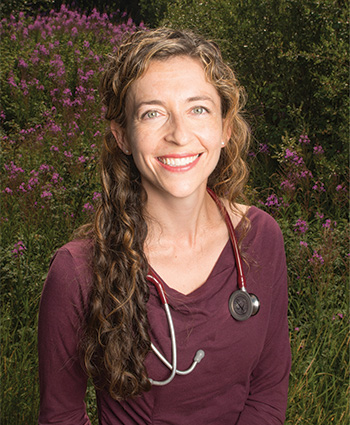
- Born: Courtney Gail Howard; November 7, 1978 (age 48); Vancouver, British Columbia, Canada
- Education: McGill University; Simon Fraser University
- Occupation: Physician
- Employer: Stanton Territorial Hospital
- Known for: Public health, President-Elect Canadian Medical Association
- Political party: Green Party of Canada
- Board member of: Canadian Medical Association, Canadian Association of Physicians for the Environment
- Website: Official website

Courtney Gail Howard (born November 7, 1978) is a Canadian ER physician who was President of the Canadian Association of Physicians for the Environment, as well as President-Elect of the Canadian Medical Association, Associate Professor at the University of Calgary Cumming School of Medicine, and a former candidate for the leadership of the Green Party of Canada based in Yellowknife, Northwest Territories. She is currently Chair of the Board of the Global Climate and Health Alliance.

Howard attended Simon Fraser University and went to medical school at McGill University. Howard has been featured or published in The Lancet, People, The Conversation, the National Observer, and other publications.

== Publications ==
Title	Authors	Year & Publisher	DOI/Link
There is a way out: Preventing oilsands health tragedy from becoming Canada's permanent legacy	Courtney Howard	2013 Vancouver Observer	
Open letter from Canadian physicians to Justin Trudeau	Courtney Howard	2015 National Observer	
A pledge for planetary health to unite health professionals in the Anthropocene	Katharina-Jaqueline Wabnitz, Sabine Gabrysch, Renzo Guinto, Andy Haines, Martin Herrmann, Courtney Howard	2020 The Lancet	doi:10.1016/S0140-6736(20)32039-0
Targeted change making for a healthy recovery	Courtney Howard	2020 The Lancet	
Climate change puts health at risk and economists have the right prescription	Christopher Ragan Courtney Howard	2020 The Conversation	
COVID-19 crisis is a tipping point. Will we invest in planetary health, or oil and gas?	Courtney Howard	2020 National Observer	

== Electoral record ==
2020 Green Party of Canada leadership election results by round
Candidate	1st round		2nd round		3rd round		4th round		5th round		6th round		7th round		8th round	
Candidate	Votes cast	%	Votes cast	%	Votes cast	%	Votes cast	%	Votes cast	%	Votes cast	%	Votes cast	%	Votes cast	%
Annamie Paul	6,242	26.14%	6,242	26.16%	6,305	26.24%	6,478	27.23%	6,952	29.44%	7,614	32.52%	8,862	38.52%	12,090	54.53%
Dimitri Lascaris	5,768	24.15%	5,773	24.20%	5,813	24.40%	6,586	27.69%	7,050	29.86%	7,551	32.25%	8,340	36.22%	10,081	45.47%
Courtney Howard	3,285	13.76%	3,285	13.77%	3,348	14.05%	3,404	14.31%	3,762	15.93%	4,523	19.32%	5,824	25.29%	Eliminated	
Glen Murray	2,745	11.50%	2,746	11.51%	2,821	11.84%	2,846	11.96%	2,992	12.67%	3,725	15.91%	Eliminated			
David Merner	2,636	11.04%	2,636	11.05%	2,697	11.32%	2,727	11.46%	2,856	12.10%	Eliminated					
Amita Kuttner	1,468	6.15%	1,470	6.16%	1,486	6.24%	1,748	7.35%	Eliminated							
Meryam Haddad	1,345	5.63%	1,346	5.64%	1,358	5.70%	Eliminated									
Andrew West	352	1.47%	356	1.49%	Eliminated											
None Of The Above	36	0.15%	Eliminated													
Total	23,877	100%	23,854	100%	23,828	100%	23,788	100%	23,612	100%	23,413	100%	23,026	100%	22,171	100%
