= 2020 Green Party of Canada leadership election =

- October 3, 2020
- Turnout: 68.8%
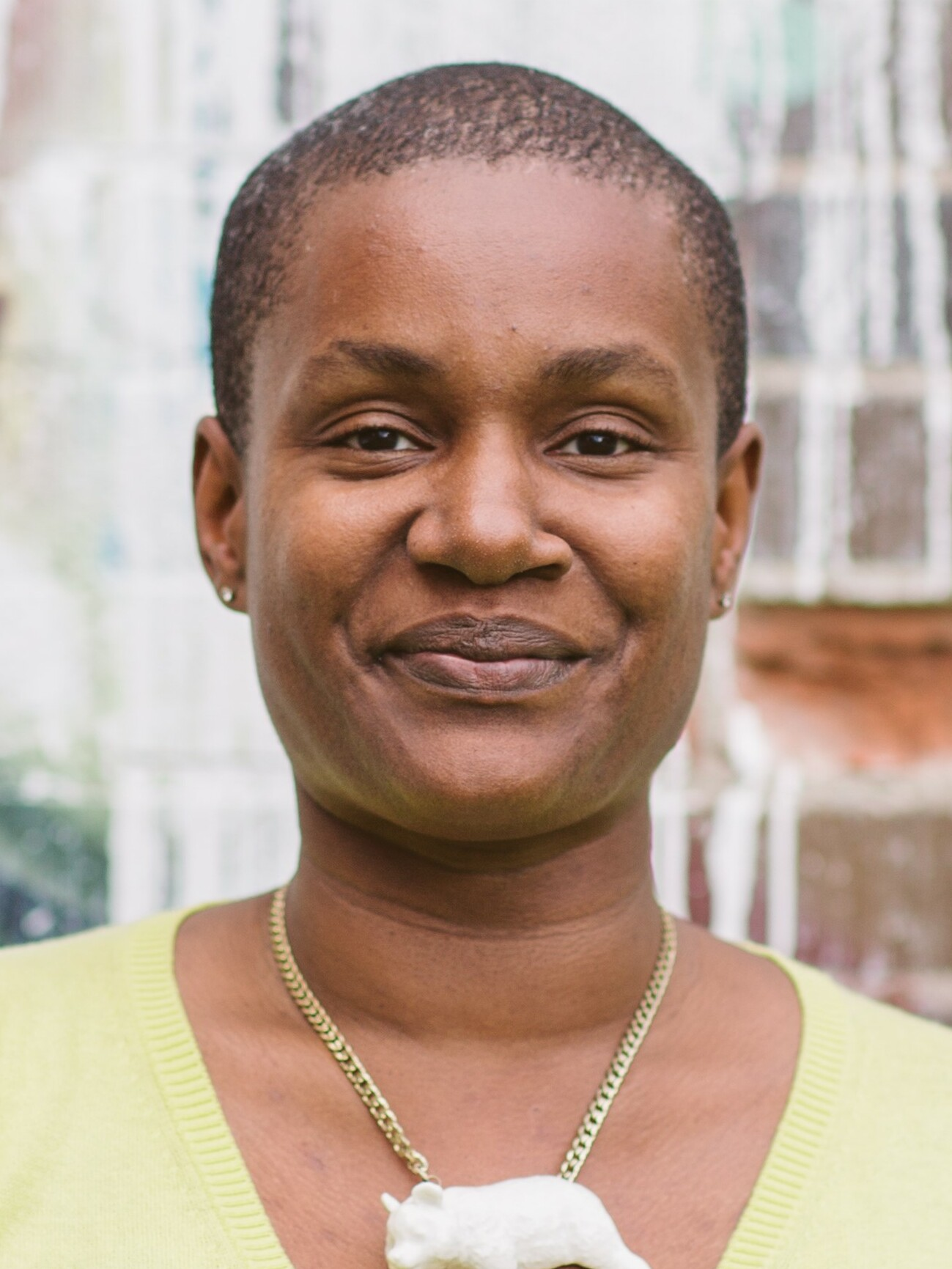

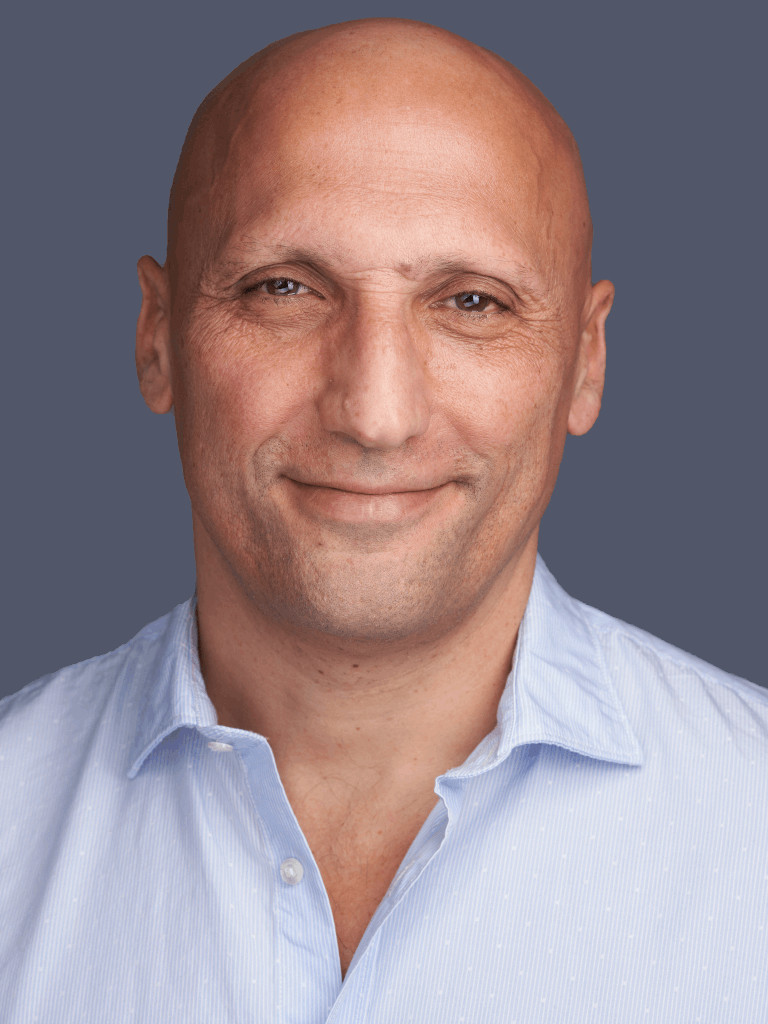

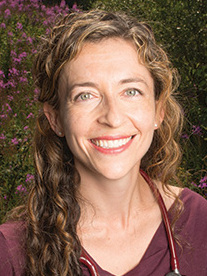

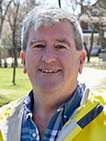

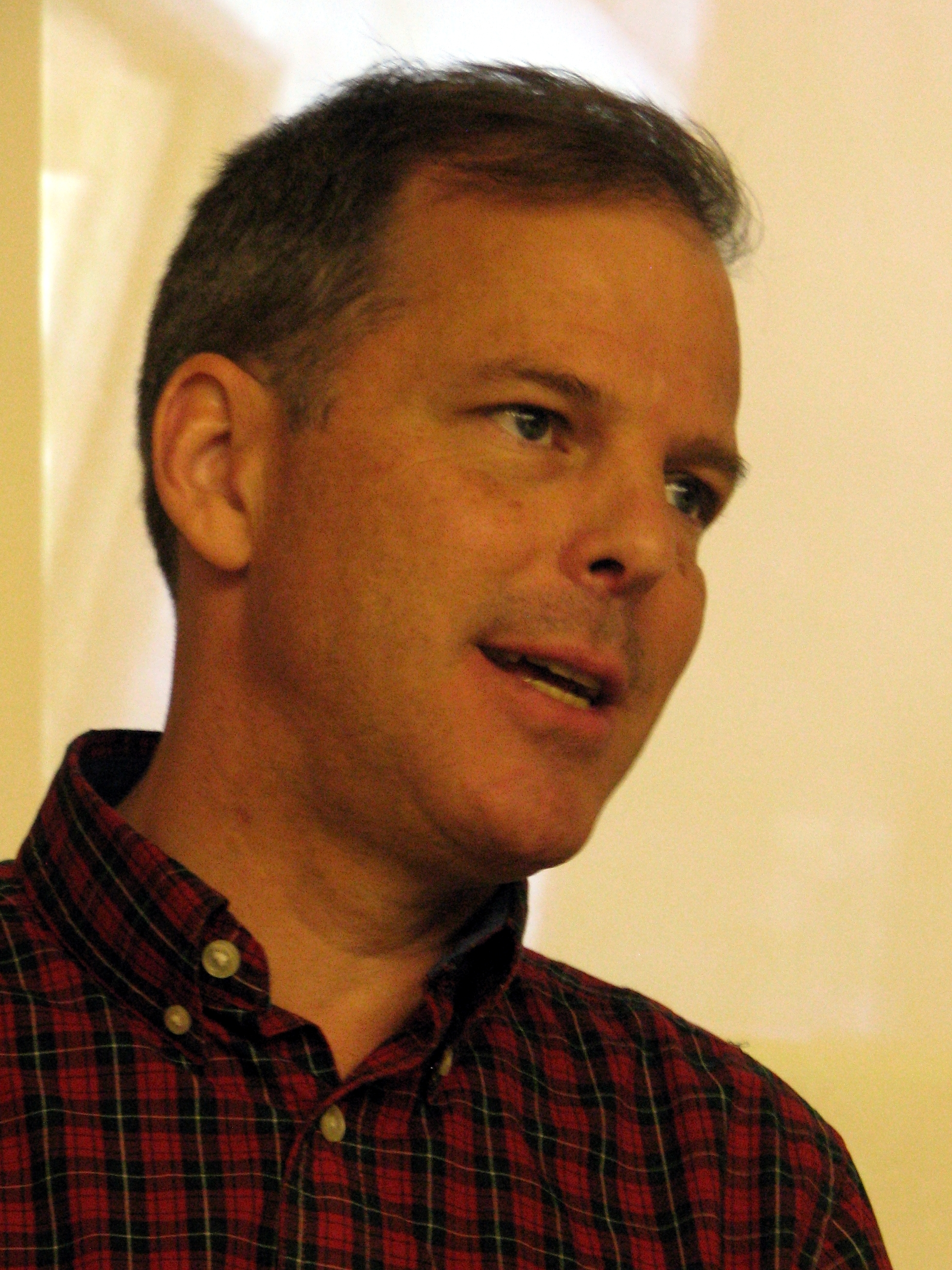

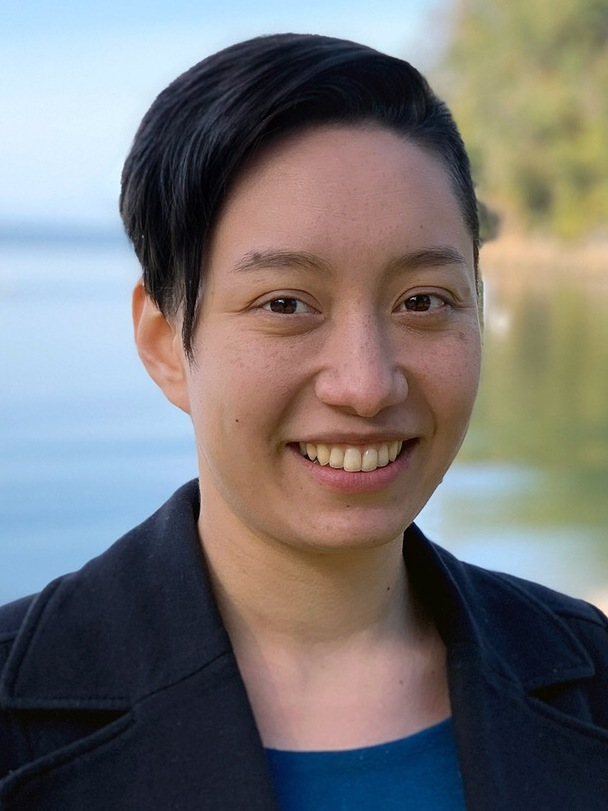

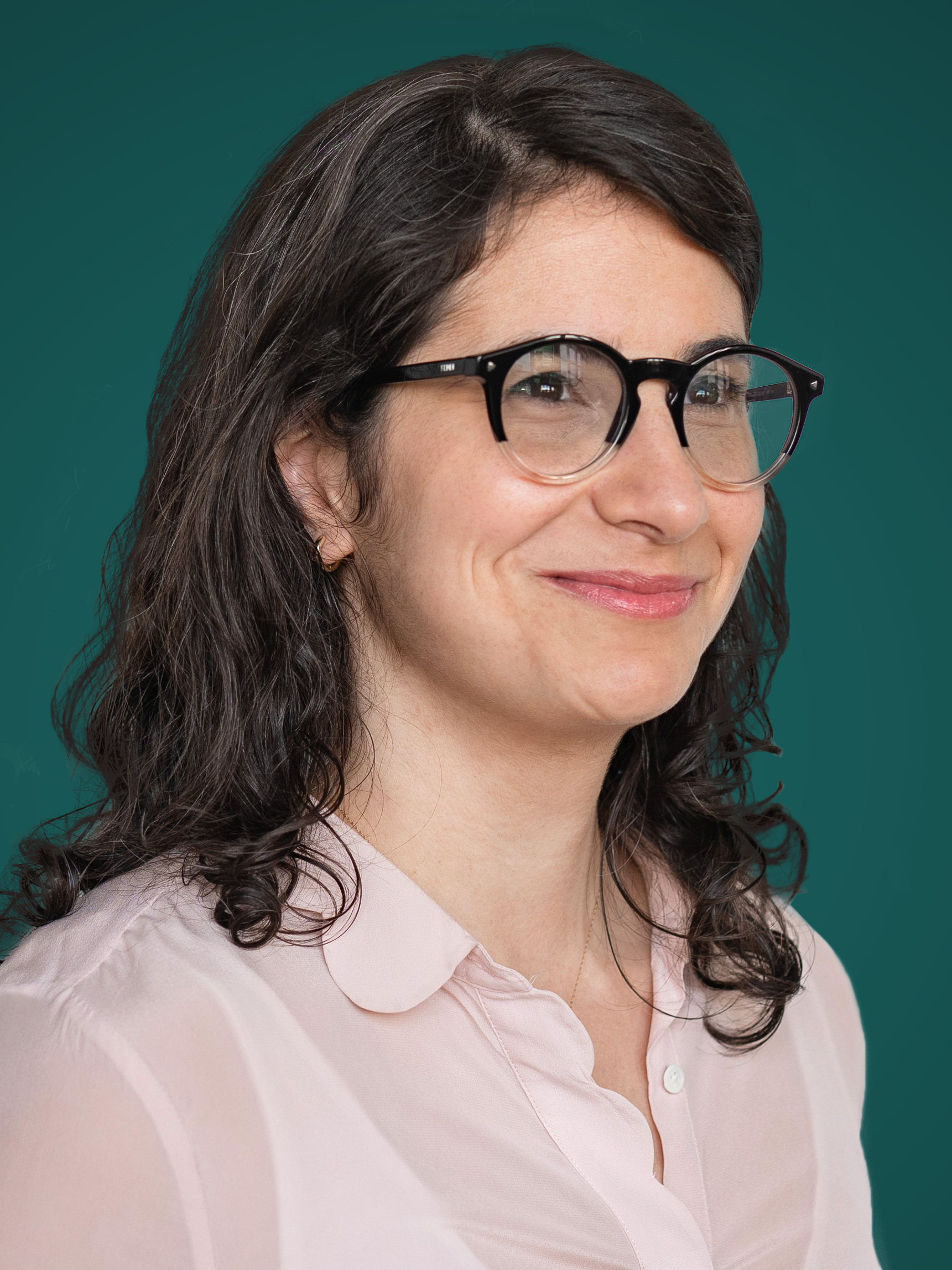
Candidate	Annamie Paul	Dimitri Lascaris	Courtney Howard
Final ballot	12,090 (50.63%)	10,081 (42.22%)	Eliminated
First ballot	6,242 (26.14%)	5,768 (24.15%)	3,285 (13.76%)
Candidate	Glen Murray	David Merner	Amita Kuttner
Final ballot	Eliminated	Eliminated	Eliminated
First ballot	2,745 (11.50%)	2,636; 11.04%	1,468; 6.15%
Candidate	Meryam Haddad
Final ballot	Eliminated
First ballot	1,345; 5.63%
Previous Leader
Jo-Ann Roberts (interim)
Elizabeth May (elected)
Leader
Annamie Paul

2020 Green Party leadership election
- Date: September 26–October 3, 2020
- Convention: Ottawa, Ontario (Note: Online convention. Originally scheduled to take place in Charlottetown, Prince Edward Island, but was moved online due to COVID-19.)
- Resigning leader: Elizabeth May
- Won by: Annamie Paul
- Ballots: 23,877
- Candidates: 8+ NOTA
- Entrance fee: $30,000
- Spending limit: $500,000

The Green Party of Canada held a leadership election between September 26 and October 3, 2020. The election was held to replace Elizabeth May, who resigned on November 4, 2019, after leading the party for more than a decade and achieving a record three seats in Parliament in the 2019 federal election. Eight candidates ran to replace her. While these candidates offered different visions for the future of the party and made various policy proposals, they all agreed that climate change is a serious issue, opposed the construction of new pipelines, supported a guaranteed livable income, and supported adopting some form of proportional representation in federal elections.

No polling for the leadership race was released during the contest, and so frontrunner status was largely determined in the media on the basis of candidate fundraising. In that sense, the two frontrunners were Annamie Paul and Dimitri Lascaris. Paul, an activist and lawyer from Toronto, won the election on the eighth round of voting. Her win was described as a win for "the more centrist camp".

== Election format ==
The vote was held online between September 26 and October 3, as well as by mail-in ballot. All party members as of 11:59 p.m. PDT on September 3, 2020, who were 14 years of age or older were eligible to vote. The vote was conducted through a one member, one vote preferential ballot with a none of the above option. The candidate with a majority of votes after a minimum of one ballot would win the leadership.

The Greens originally planned to announce the election results at the party's biennial convention in Charlottetown, Prince Edward Island, however the convention was cancelled due to the COVID-19 pandemic. Instead, the candidates gathered in Ottawa, Ontario for the results, which were announced online at 9:00 p.m. ADT on October 3.

== Timeline ==
=== 2019 ===
- October 24 – Elizabeth May announced that she would step down as leader within the next four years, but intended to continue for "the near term", as an early election could complicate the transition.
- November 3 – A group of party members launched a petition calling for an open leadership race to ensure the "long-term prosperity of the party"; among those members was Green Party of Quebec leader Alex Tyrrell, who later became a candidate for the leadership himself.
- November 4 – May announced she was stepping down as leader effective immediately. Jo-Ann Roberts was named interim leader. May stayed on as the parliamentary leader in the House.
- November 5 – David Merner announces his candidacy.
- December 2 – Julie Tremblay-Cloutier announces her candidacy.

=== 2020 ===
- January 15 – Alex Tyrrell, leader of the Green Party of Quebec, announces his candidacy.
- January 23 – Judy N. Green and Constantine Kritsonis announce their candidacies.
- January 30 – Annamie Paul announces her candidacy.
- February 3 –
  - The rules for the leadership race were released, including the announcement of a $50,000 entrance fee requirement for candidates.
  - Constantine Kritsonis withdraws his candidacy as a result of the rules.
- February 4 – Nomination period opens.
- February 14 – Julie Tremblay-Cloutier withdraws her candidacy.
- February 24 – Don Elzer announces his candidacy.
- March 9 – Amita Kuttner announces their candidacy.
- March 11 – Dimitri Lascaris announces his candidacy.
- March 17 – Dylan Perceval-Maxwell announces his candidacy.
- March 24 – The candidacy of Annamie Paul is approved.
- April 4 – The candidacy of David Merner is approved.
- April 22 – The candidacy of Amita Kuttner is approved.
- April 29 – Glen Murray, former Ontario Liberal cabinet minister, former MPP for Toronto Centre and former Mayor of Winnipeg, declares his candidacy.
- May 6 – The party reduced the entrance fee from $50,000 to $30,000, citing difficulty fundraising due to the COVID-19 pandemic in Canada.
- May 11 – The candidacy of Glen Murray is approved.
- May 15 – Andrew West announces his candidacy.
- May 22 – Meryam Haddad announces her candidacy.
- May 26 – The candidacy of Dimitri Lascaris is rejected by the party, pending appeal.
- May 29 – The candidacy of Dylan Perceval-Maxwell is approved.
- June 2 –
  - The candidacy of Dimitri Lascaris is reinstated and approved following the appeal of his disqualification.
  - The candidacy of Judy N. Green is rejected by the party, pending appeal.
- June 3 –
  - The candidacy of Meryam Haddad is approved.
  - Alex Tyrrell withdraws his candidacy.
  - Don Elzer withdraws his candidacy.
  - 6 p.m. PDT – Nomination period closes. Initial entrance fee of $10,000 due.
- June 10 – The candidacy of Judy N. Green is reinstated and approved following the appeal of her disqualification.
- June 11 –
  - The candidacy of Andrew West is approved.
  - Courtney Howard announces her candidacy.
- June 12 – The candidacy of Courtney Howard is approved.
- June 21 – A debate hosted by Fair Vote Canada is held.
- June 23–24 – A two-part debate hosted by The Agenda with Steve Paikin is held, with both parts broadcast on TVO and online.
- July 8 – Dylan Perceval-Maxwell is removed from the leadership contest following inappropriate remarks during and following the June 23–24 debates.
- August 30 – Judy N. Green withdraws her candidacy and endorses David Merner.
- August 1 – September 1 – Leadership candidates must supply signatures of 150 party members, at least 20 of which must be from each of six regions. Signatures are in addition to 100 signatures provided with leadership application.
- September 1 – Deadline for receipt of secondary non-refundable fee of $20,000 (in addition to $1,000 at time of filing application to run and $9,000 ten days after application received).
- September 3 at 11:59 p.m. PDT – Deadline to become a member of the Green Party and be eligible to vote.
- September 22 – The party announces that Meryam Haddad has been removed from the contest, due to violations of the party's code of conduct. Haddad plans to appeal.
- September 24 – Haddad successfully appeals her disqualification and is restored to the ballot.
- September 25 – Deadline for receipt of mail-in ballots.
- September 26 – Online voting begins.
- October 3 –
  - 3:30 p.m. PDT – Online voting ends.
  - 5 p.m. PDT – Results announced.

== Fundraising ==
View source data.

== Full results ==
Results by round
Candidate	1st round		2nd round		3rd round		4th round		5th round		6th round		7th round		8th round	
Candidate	Votes cast	%	Votes cast	%	Votes cast	%	Votes cast	%	Votes cast	%	Votes cast	%	Votes cast	%	Votes cast	%
Annamie Paul	6,242	26.14%	6,245	26.15%	6,305	26.41%	6,478	27.13%	6,952	29.12%	7,614	31.89%	8,862	37.12%	12,090	50.63%
Dimitri Lascaris	5,768	24.15%	5,773	24.18%	5,813	24.35%	6,586	27.58%	7,050	29.53%	7,551	31.62%	8,340	34.93%	10,081	42.22%
Courtney Howard	3,285	13.76%	3,286	13.76%	3,348	14.02%	3,404	14.26%	3,762	15.76%	4,523	18.94%	5,824	24.39%	Eliminated	
Glen Murray	2,745	11.50%	2,746	11.50%	2,821	11.81%	2,846	11.92%	2,992	12.53%	3,725	15.60%	Eliminated			
David Merner	2,636	11.04%	2,636	11.04%	2,697	11.30%	2,727	11.42%	2,856	11.96%	Eliminated					
Amita Kuttner	1,468	6.15%	1,470	6.16%	1,486	6.22%	1,748	7.32%	Eliminated							
Meryam Haddad	1,345	5.63%	1,346	5.64%	1,358	5.69%	Eliminated									
Andrew West	352	1.47%	356	1.49%	Eliminated											
None of the options	36	0.15%	Eliminated													
Exhausted Votes	0	0.00%	19	0.08%	49	0.21%	88	0.37%	265	1.11%	464	1.94%	851	3.56%	1,706	7.14%
Total	23,877	100%	23,877	100%	23,877	100%	23,877	100%	23,877	100%	23,877	100%	23,877	100%	23,877	100%

View source data.

Analysis of transferred votes, ranked in order of 1st preference votes
Candidate	Maximum round	Maximum votes	Share in maximum round	Maximum votes First round votesTransfer votes
Annamie Paul	8	12,090	50.63%	
Dimitri Lascaris	8	10,081	42.22%	
Courtney Howard	7	5,824	24.39%	
Glen Murray	6	3,725	15.60%	
David Merner	5	2,856	11.96%	
Amita Kuttner	4	1,748	7.32%	
Meryam Haddad	3	1,358	5.69%	
Andrew West	2	356	1.49%	
None of the options	1	36	0.15%	
Exhausted votes		1,706	7.14%	

First round
Paul	26.14%
Lascaris	24.15%
Howard	13.76%
Murray	11.50%
Merner	11.04%
Kuttner	6.15%
Haddad	5.63%
West	1.47%
None of the options	0.15%
Exhausted Votes	0.00%

Second round
Paul	26.15%
Lascaris	24.18%
Howard	13.76%
Murray	11.50%
Merner	11.04%
Kuttner	6.16%
Haddad	5.64%
West	1.49%
Exhausted Votes	0.08%

Third round
Paul	26.41%
Lascaris	24.35%
Howard	14.02%
Murray	11.81%
Merner	11.30%
Kuttner	6.22%
Haddad	5.69%
Exhausted Votes	0.21%

Fourth round
Lascaris	27.58%
Paul	27.13%
Howard	14.26%
Murray	11.92%
Merner	11.42%
Kuttner	7.32%
Exhausted Votes	0.37%

Fifth round
Lascaris	29.53%
Paul	29.12%
Howard	15.76%
Murray	12.53%
Merner	11.96%
Exhausted Votes	1.11%

Sixth round
Paul	31.89%
Lascaris	31.62%
Howard	18.94%
Murray	15.60%
Exhausted Votes	1.94%

Seventh round
Paul	37.12%
Lascaris	34.93%
Howard	24.39%
Exhausted Votes	3.56%

Eighth round
Paul	50.63%
Lascaris	42.22%
Exhausted Votes	7.14%

== Debates ==
Debates among candidates for the 2020 Green Party of Canada leadership election
No.	Date	Place	Host	Topic	Moderator	Language	Participants										References
P Participant A Absent invitee N Non-invitee O Out of race (exploring, withdrawn or disqualified)							Green	Haddad	Howard	Kuttner	Lascaris	Merner	Murray	Paul	Perceval-Maxwell	West	
1	June 21, 2020	Online	Fair Vote Canada	Democracy	Elizabeth May, Jim Harris	English	P	P	A (Note: Sent pre-recorded video answers.)	P	P	P	P	P	P	A	
2	June 23, 2020	Online	TVOntario (TVO)	Various	Steve Paikin	English	P	P	P	P	P	P	P	P	P	P	
3	June 29, 2020	Online	Green Party of Manitoba	Various	James Beddome	Bilingual	P	P	A	P	P	P	P	P	P	P	
4	July 20, 2020	Online (Quebec)	Green Party of Canada	Various	Chad Walcott, Julie Tremblay-Cloutier	French	P	P	P	P	P	P	P	P	O	P	
5	July 21, 2020	Online (Prairies)	Green Party of Canada	Various	Naomi Hunter, Sai Rajagopal	English	P	P	P	P	P	P	P	P	O	P	
6	July 23, 2020	Online (Atlantic)	Green Party of Canada	Various	Jenica Atwin, Peter Bevan-Baker	Bilingual	P	P	P	P	P	P	P	P	O	P	
7	July 27, 2020	Online (North)	Green Party of Canada	Various	Lenore Morris, Rylund Johnson	English	P	P	P	P	P	P	P	P	O	P	
8	July 28, 2020	Online (BC)	Green Party of Canada	Various	Paul Manly, Jonina Campbell	English	P	P	P	P	P	P	P	P	O	P	
9	July 30, 2020	Online (Ontario)	Green Party of Canada	Various	Mike Schreiner, Roberta Herod	English	P	P	P	P	P	P	P	P	O	P	
10	August 5, 2020	Online (Quebec)	Quebec wing	Quebec Issues	Ralph Shayne, Érica Poirier	French	A	P	A (Note: Sent pre-recorded video answers.)	P	P	P	A	P	O	A (Note: The debate was without translation which Andrew West asked for in order to be able to participate.)	
11	August 23, 2020	Online	Young Greens of Canada	Youth Issues	Bryanne Lamoureux, Clément Badra	Bilingual	P	P	P	P	P	P	P	P	O	P	
12	September 3, 2020	Online (Québec)	Green Party of Quebec	Quebec Issues	Halimatou Bah, Alain Joseph	French	O	P	P	A (Note: Due to a family emergency, Amita Kuttner was unable to participate.)	P	P	P	P	O	A (Note: The debate was without translation which Andrew West asked for in order to be able to participate.)	
13	September 10, 2020	Online	rabble.ca, Canadian Foreign Policy Institute	Foreign Affairs	Judy Rebick	English	O	P	P	P	P	P	P	P	O	P	
14	September 20, 2020	Online	Heartwood Institute	Electoral Strategy	Jim Harris, Abhijeet Manay, Liz Lilly	English	O	A	P	P	P	P	P	P	O	P	
15	September 22, 2020	Online	South Okanagan - West Kootenay EDA	Food Security	Tara Howse	English	O	P/O (Note: Haddad joined to say that she had been disqualified from the race, and did not participate further in the debate)	P	P	P	P	P	P	O	P	

== Candidates ==
=== Meryam Haddad ===
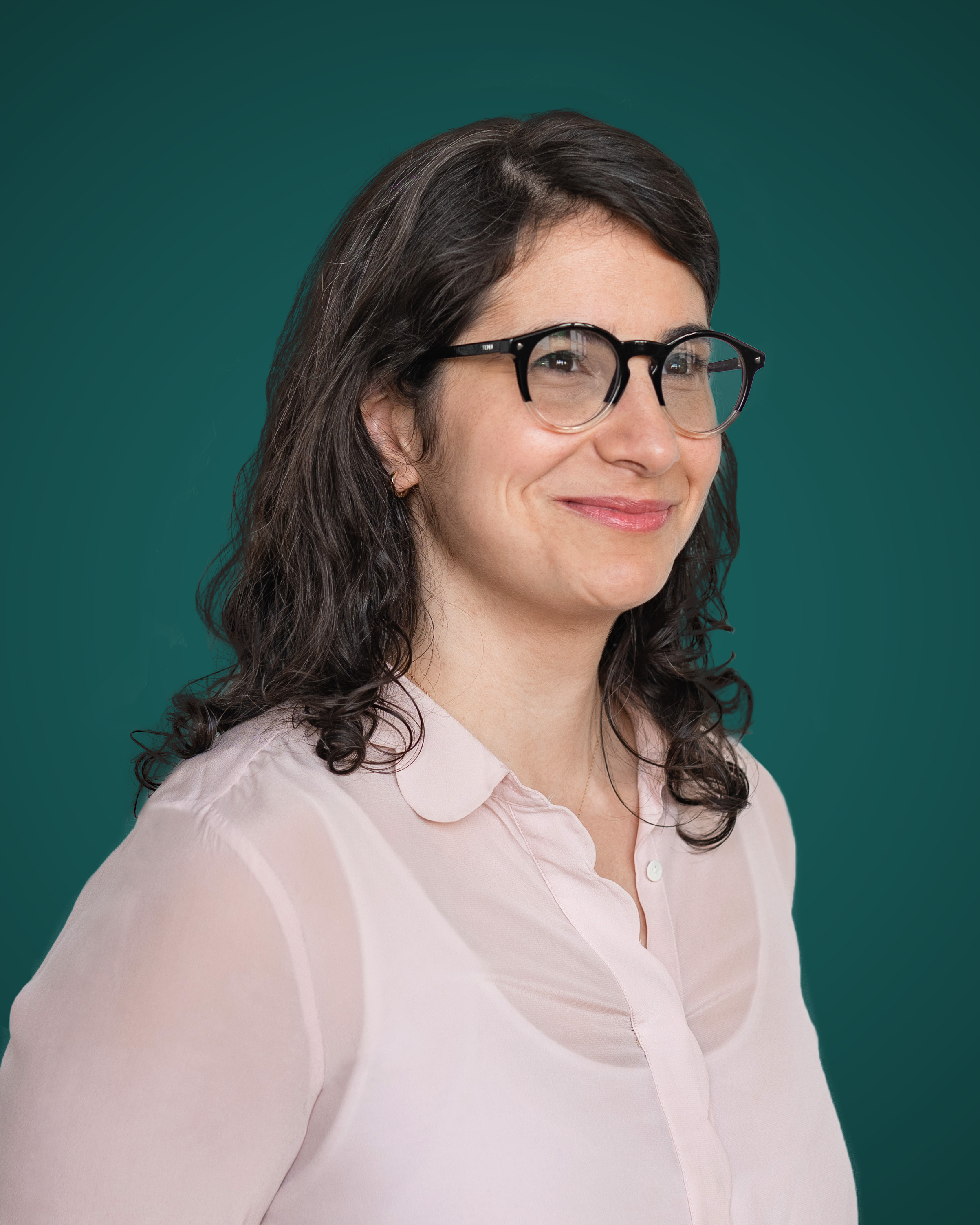
Meryam Haddad

Background

Meryam Haddad, 32, is an immigration lawyer residing in Montreal, Quebec. Haddad immigrated from Syria at the age of 5 and has been a resident of Montreal since. She holds a Bachelor of Laws from the University of Ottawa and was the candidate for Châteauguay—Lacolle in 2019. She is openly lesbian.

Candidacy announced: May 22, 2020
Candidacy approved: June 3, 2020
Disqualified: September 22, 2020
Reinstated: September 24, 2020
Date registered with Elections Canada:
Campaign website: meryam2020.ca
Notes: In the lead-up to the 2020 British Columbia general election, Haddad criticized the Green Party of British Columbia over leader Sonia Furstenau's positions on defunding the police and Indigenous land rights, saying she would endorse the BC Ecosocialists over the Greens' provincial wing. She was disqualified from the election by the Green Party on September 22 for "intentionally undertaking an action that would bring the Green Party of Canada into disrepute." Haddad appealed and was reinstated two days later.

Policies

- Running as an eco-socialist.
- Restructure the party to emphasize on inclusivity and diversity.
- Implement a Green New Deal.
- Calls for key positions within the party to be bilingual.
- Abolition of the police.
- De-colonizing Canada and promoting Canadian republicanism.

=== Courtney Howard ===
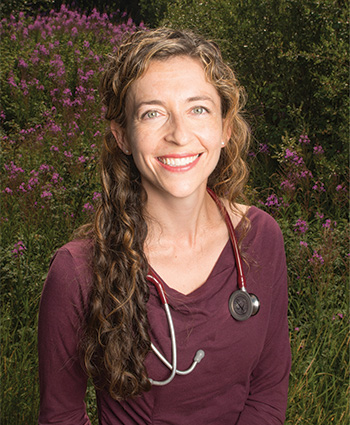
Courtney Howard

Background

Courtney Howard, 41, is an emergency room physician residing in Yellowknife, Northwest Territories. She holds degrees from Simon Fraser University, University of British Columbia, and McGill University. She is the President of the Canadian Association of Physicians for the Environment and a Clinical Associate Professor in the Cumming School of Medicine at the University of Calgary.

Candidacy announced: June 11, 2020
Candidacy approved: June 12, 2020
Date registered with Elections Canada:
Campaign website: drcourtneyhoward.ca

Policies

- Redefine the Green Party as the party of "a healthy planet for healthy people".
- Supports a stronger social safety net and guaranteed minimum income.
- Legislate a Community Care Act (universal childcare, pharmacare, psychological care, and dental care).
- Fund community-centered agriculture plans.
- Prioritize the construction of a national electrical grid relying on 100 per cent clean energy.
- Ensure a 1:1 lobbyist to NGO ratio for meetings with lawmakers.
- Establish compassionate crisis-response teams for RCMP units.
- Lower the voting age to 16 and prioritize electoral reform.
- Develop a national strategy on broadband and connectivity for rural and Indigenous communities.

=== Amita Kuttner ===
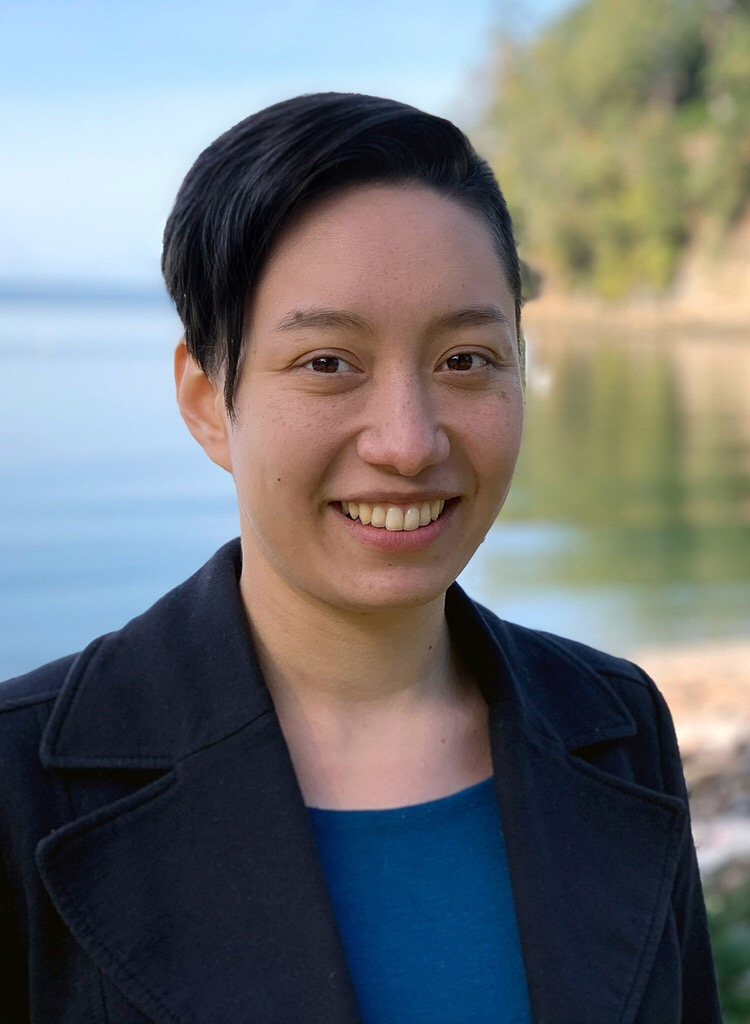
Amita Kuttner

Background

Amita Kuttner, 30, is an astrophysicist residing on Lasqueti Island, British Columbia. They hold a doctorate from the University of California, Santa Cruz. During the 2019 federal election, Kuttner was the candidate for Burnaby North—Seymour. Following the election, they served as the Green Party's Science and Innovation Critic. They are also the co-founder and director of the Moonlight Institute. Kuttner is openly non-binary and pansexual, and uses they/them pronouns. They have refused to hold fundraising events with former leader Elizabeth May, saying the offer of assistance with fundraising does not address other systemic inequities in the race.

Candidacy announced: March 9, 2020
Candidacy approved: April 22, 2020
Date registered with Elections Canada:
Campaign website: amitakuttner.ca

Policies

- Universal pharmacare, dental care, vision care, mental care, and preventive health measures.
- Free post-secondary tuition.
- Introduce new policy regarding artificial intelligence, such as a robot tax, to protect Canadian workers.
- Commit to protecting 30 per cent of aquatic habitat and 30 per cent of terrestrial habitat in Canada by 2030 along with increasing funding to develop recovery plans and protections for endangered species.
- Guaranteed livable income, development of unions in sectors where they are absent, better legislation for workers’ rights.
- Housing as a human right, including investment in social housing and federal funding of non-market solutions.
- Lower the voting age to 16.
- Implement a proportional representation electoral system.
- Work with firearm owners and public safety experts to develop and maintain an evidence-based class of prohibited firearms.
- Decriminalize drug use and sex work.

=== Dimitri Lascaris ===
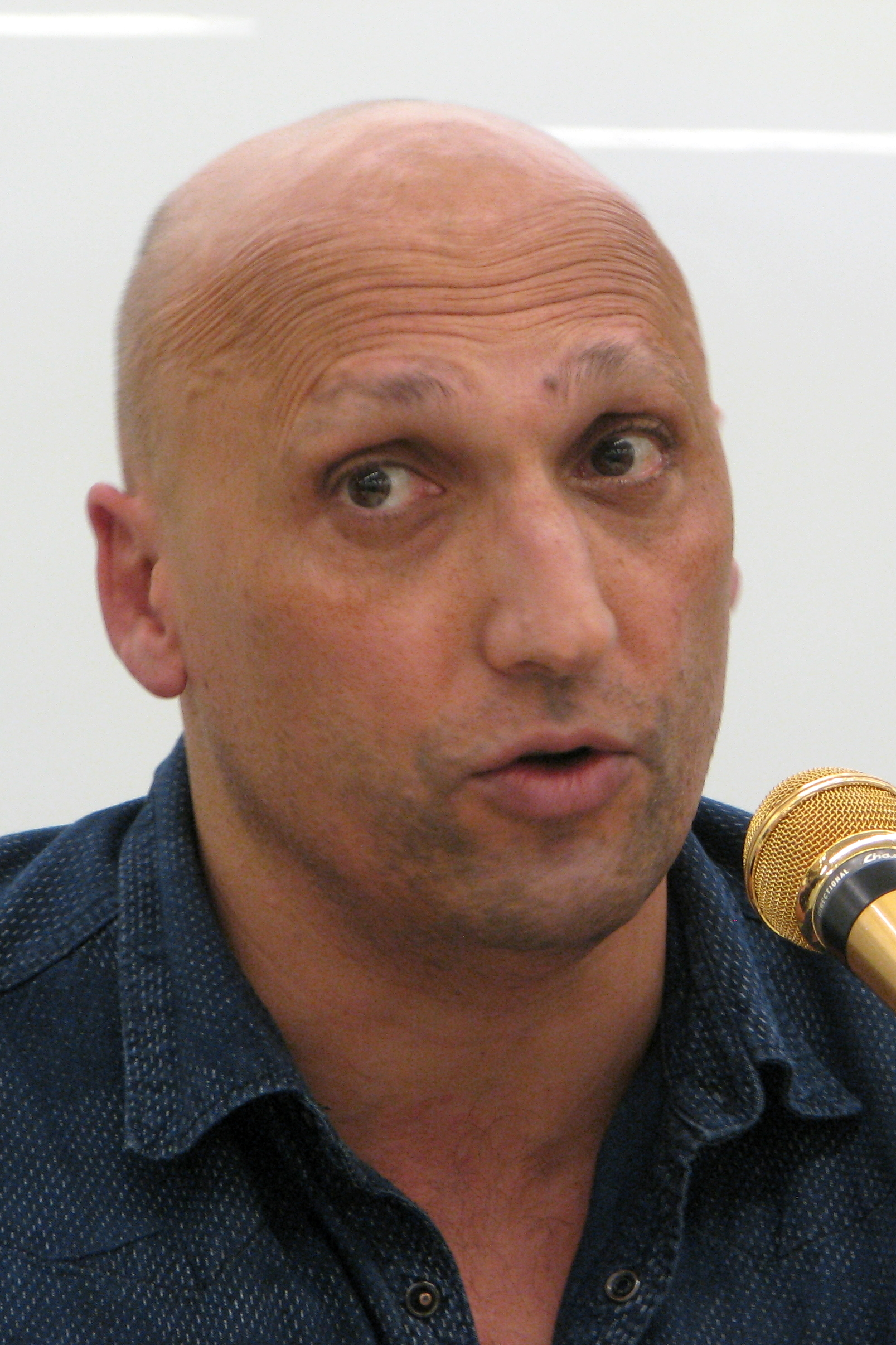
Dimitri Lascaris

Background

Dimitri Lascaris, 56, is a lawyer and pro-Russian activist who was born in London, Ontario, and resides in Montreal, Quebec. He holds a law degree from the University of Toronto. He was the federal candidate for London West in 2015 and the Justice Critic in the Green Party's shadow cabinet in 2016, and is a former member of the Quebec Greens' National Executive.

Candidacy announced: March 11, 2020
Disqualified: May 26, 2020
Reinstated and approved: June 2, 2020
Date registered with Elections Canada:
Campaign website: www.teamdimitri.ca

Policies

- Institute labour reforms to increase union membership.
- Prevent the use of replacement workers during strikes.
- Raise the minimum wage to $20 per hour.
- Increase income tax on wealthy Canadians and institute a cap on wealth.
- Make housing a human right.
- Dramatically reduce military spending.
- Support BDS movement.
- Cancel the Saudi arms deal and impose a ban on trading in arms with all states that do not comply with UN Human Rights protocols and any states whose governments are engaged in violations of such human rights.
- Support a mixed-member proportional representation electoral system.
- Expand public health coverage to include dentistry, pharmacare, eldercare and mental health care.

Notes

Lascaris' candidacy was initially rejected by the party's vetting committee, which was appealed. The appeal was accepted on June 2, and his candidacy was reinstated and approved.

=== David Merner ===
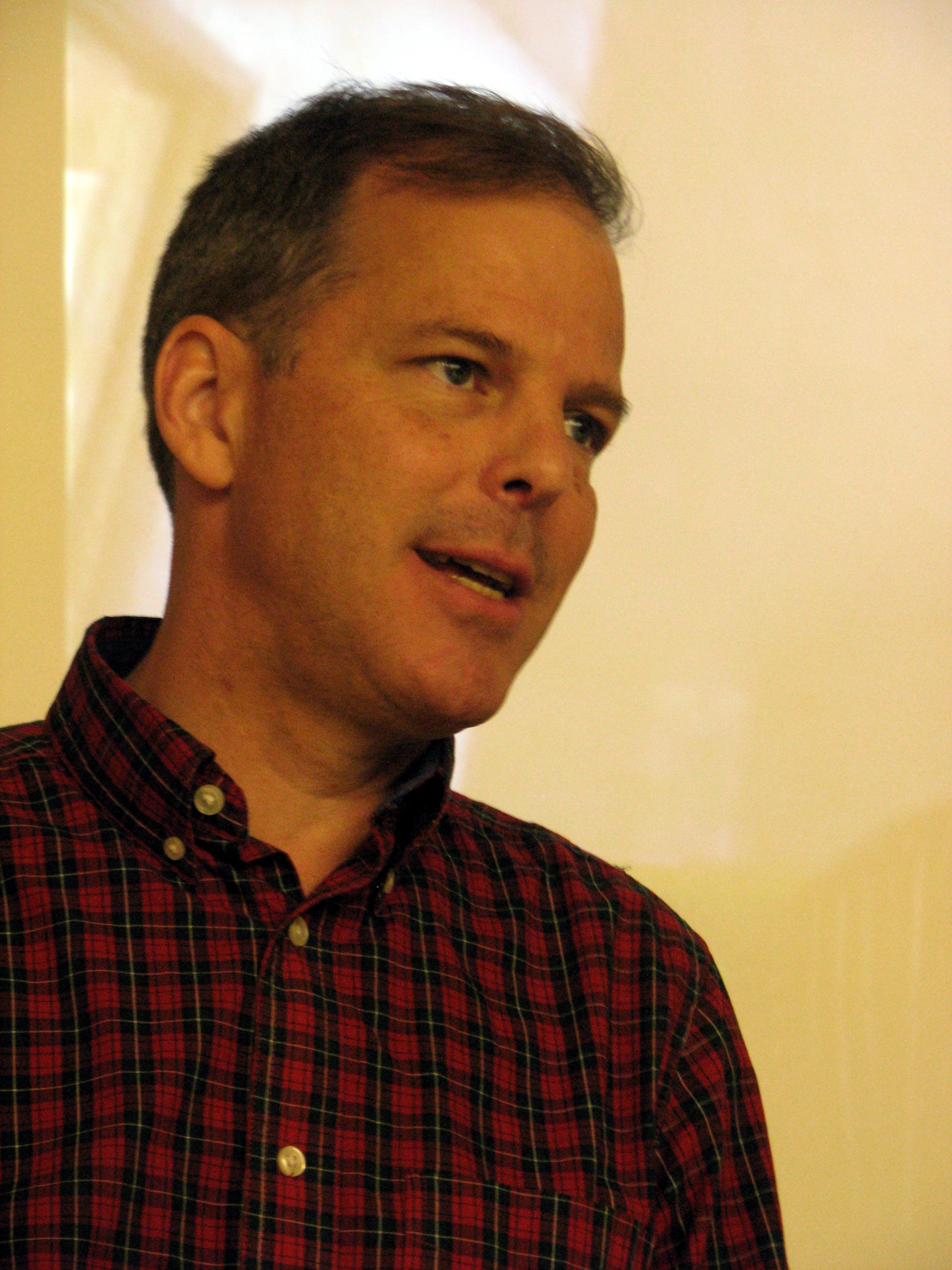
David Merner

Background

David Merner, 58, is a retired lawyer residing on Vancouver Island, British Columbia. He holds degrees from Harvard College, University of Alberta, Oxford University, and University of Toronto. Prior to his university studies, David was largely educated in French pre-schools and primary schools. He was the former Green Party Critic for Justice (2018–2020), and was the Green Party candidate for Esquimalt—Saanich—Sooke in 2019. From 2012 to 2013, he was the president of the Liberal Party of Canada's British Columbia wing and was their candidate for Esquimalt—Saanich—Sooke in 2015. Prior to entering politics, Merner was a lawyer at the Department of Justice and for the Privy Council Office as well as the Ministry of Attorney General of British Columbia. He was also the recipient of the Head of the Public Service Award from the Government of Canada.

Candidacy announced: November 5, 2019
Candidacy approved: April 8, 2020
Date registered with Elections Canada:
Campaign website: davidmerner.com

Policies

- Invest in the development of public transportation at the local level, including railways.
- Free tuition.
- Universal pharmacare.
- Decriminalize drugs and provide a safe drug supply.
- Implement 20-point plan to address the climate crisis and shift to a green economy.
- Adopt a system of proportional representation.

=== Glen Murray ===
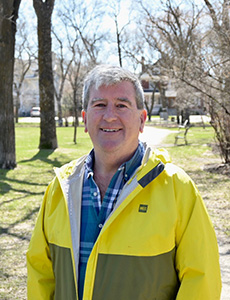
Glen Murray

Background

Glen Murray, 62, is a politician residing in Winnipeg, Manitoba. He holds a degree in Urban Studies from Concordia University. He is the former Liberal MPP for Toronto Centre (2010–2017) and a former cabinet minister under Premiers Dalton McGuinty and Kathleen Wynne, most notably as the Minister of the Environment and Climate Change (2014–2017). He was a candidate in the 2013 Ontario Liberal Party leadership election but withdrew from that contest midrace. Murray previously ran for the Liberals in Charleswood—St. James in 2004. In addition, he has also served as city councillor (1989–1998) and Mayor of Winnipeg (1998–2004). He has also been the CEO of the Canadian Urban Institute (2007–2010), and executive director of the Pembina Institute (2017–2018). He is openly gay.

Candidacy announced: April 29, 2020
Candidacy approved: May 11, 2020
Date registered with Elections Canada:
Campaign website: www.glenmurray.ca

Policies

- Work to incrementally develop a zero-waste, carbon-neutral economy and smart cities.
- Transition workers from old industries to new ones.
- Use revenue from carbon pricing to help lower and modest income communities and households cut costs and pollution through financing and grants.
- Supports guaranteed livable income and funding pharmacare.
- Supports UNDRIP.
- Supports changing electoral system to proportional representation.

=== Annamie Paul ===
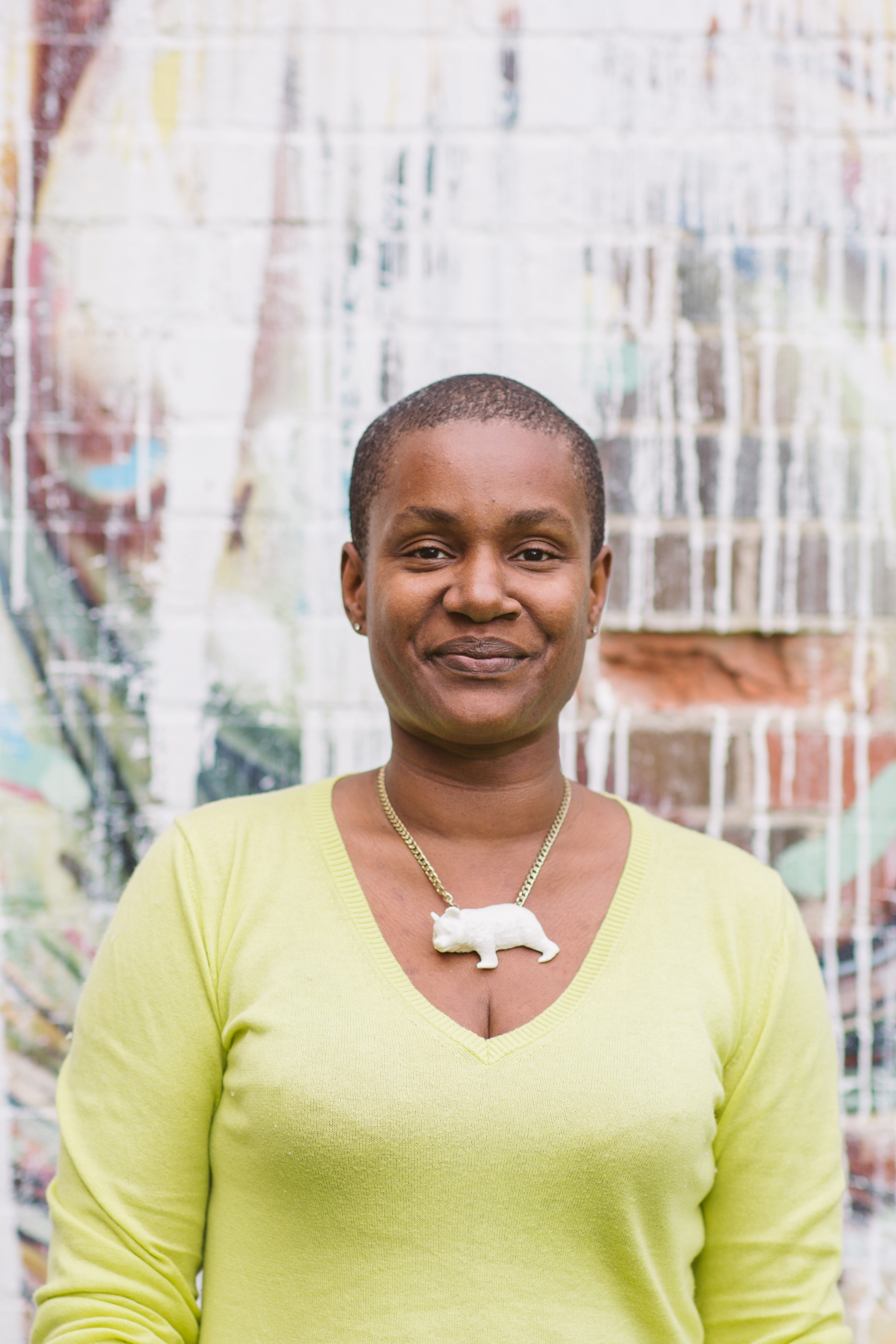
Annamie Paul

Background

Annamie Paul, 47, is a human rights lawyer residing in Toronto. She holds a Bachelor of Laws degree from the University of Ottawa and a Master of Public Administration degree from Princeton University. She was the Green Party Critic for Global Affairs (2019–2020) and the federal candidate in Toronto Centre in 2019. Paul is also the Green Party nominee for Toronto Centre in the October 26, 2020 federal by-election, having received permission from the Federal Council to do so as a leadership candidate.

Candidacy announced: January 30, 2020
Candidacy approved: March 24, 2020
Date registered with Elections Canada:
Campaign website: www.annamiepaul.ca

Policies

- Improve social security nets, particularly for times of crisis.
- Free post-secondary tuition and forgiveness of federal loan debt.
- Supports a guaranteed livable income.
- Make bailouts for sectors or private corporations, such as fossil fuels, contingent on meeting agreed emission reduction targets and not investing further in the industry.
- Withdraw from the Safe Third Country Agreement, which redirects asylum seekers to the United States, and continue allowing access for refugees to enter Canada.
- Universal pharmacare, dental care, and the recognition of mental health as an important pillar of health funded accordingly.

=== Andrew West ===
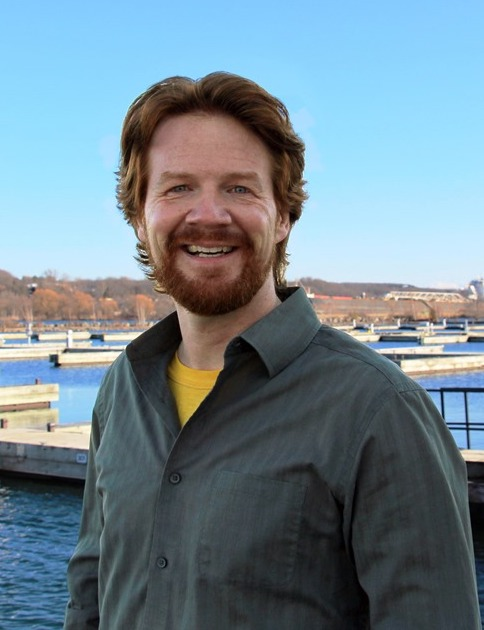
Andrew West

Andrew West, 45, is a lawyer residing in Ottawa, Ontario. He holds a degree in Environmental Law from University of Ottawa. He is the Green Party of Ontario critic for the Attorney General. He stood as the provincial candidate in Carleton—Mississippi Mills in 2014, the federal candidate in Kanata—Carleton in 2015 and provincially in 2018, and as the provincial candidate in the 2020 Orléans by-election.

Candidacy announced: May 15, 2020
Candidacy approved: June 11, 2020
Date registered with Elections Canada:
Campaign website: andrewwest.ca

Policies

- Running as a moderate.
- Court environmentalist Conservative voters.
- Switch the electoral system to proportional representation.
- Institute moratorium on oil sands development and redirect subsidies to renewable energy.
- Supports a guaranteed livable income.
- Develop a realistic timeline for balancing the federal budget.

== Candidates who withdrew or failed to qualify ==
=== Don Elzer ===
Background

Don Elzer is an environmental activist, businessman, and former journalist from Vancouver, British Columbia. He is the founder and owner of Wildcraft Forest, a natural health company. He currently resides just outside of Lumby with his family.

Candidacy announced: February 24, 2020
Withdrew: June 3, 2020
Campaign website: donelzer.com
Notes: Withdrew via email.

=== Judy N. Green ===
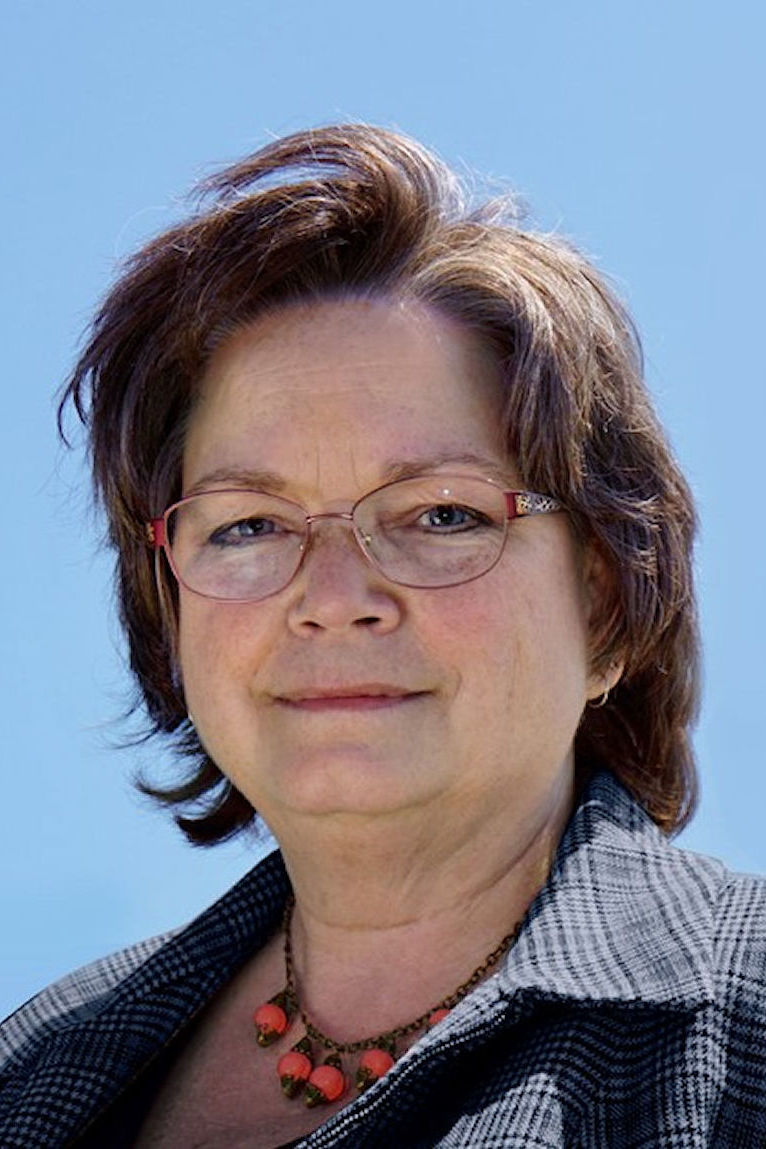
Judy N. Green

Background

Judy N. Green is a computer scientist, veteran and small business owner residing in Nova Scotia. She holds a Bachelor of Computer Science (Honours) from Acadia University and a Master of Computer Science from Carleton University. She was the candidate for West Nova in 2019.

Candidacy announced: January 23, 2020
Disqualified: June 2, 2020
Reinstated and approved: June 10, 2020
Withdrew: August 30, 2020
Endorsed: David Merner
Campaign website: judyngreen.com
Notes: Green's candidacy was rejected by the party's vetting committee on June 2, which was appealed. The appeal was accepted and her candidacy was reinstated on June 10. She withdrew on August 30 and endorsed David Merner.

=== Constantine Kritsonis ===
Background

Constantine Kritsonis, 62, is a former Ontario representative on the Green Party Council. He stood as the Green Party of Canada candidate for York Centre in 2015, 2011, 2006, 2004 and 1997, and the Green Party of Ontario candidate in Oakwood in 1995.

Candidacy announced: January 23, 2020
Withdrew: February 3, 2020
Endorsed: Dimitri Lascaris
Notes: Withdrew following announcement of the election rules, citing the entrance fee at the time of announcement, $50,000, being too high. Later endorsed Dimitri Lascaris.

=== Dylan Perceval-Maxwell ===
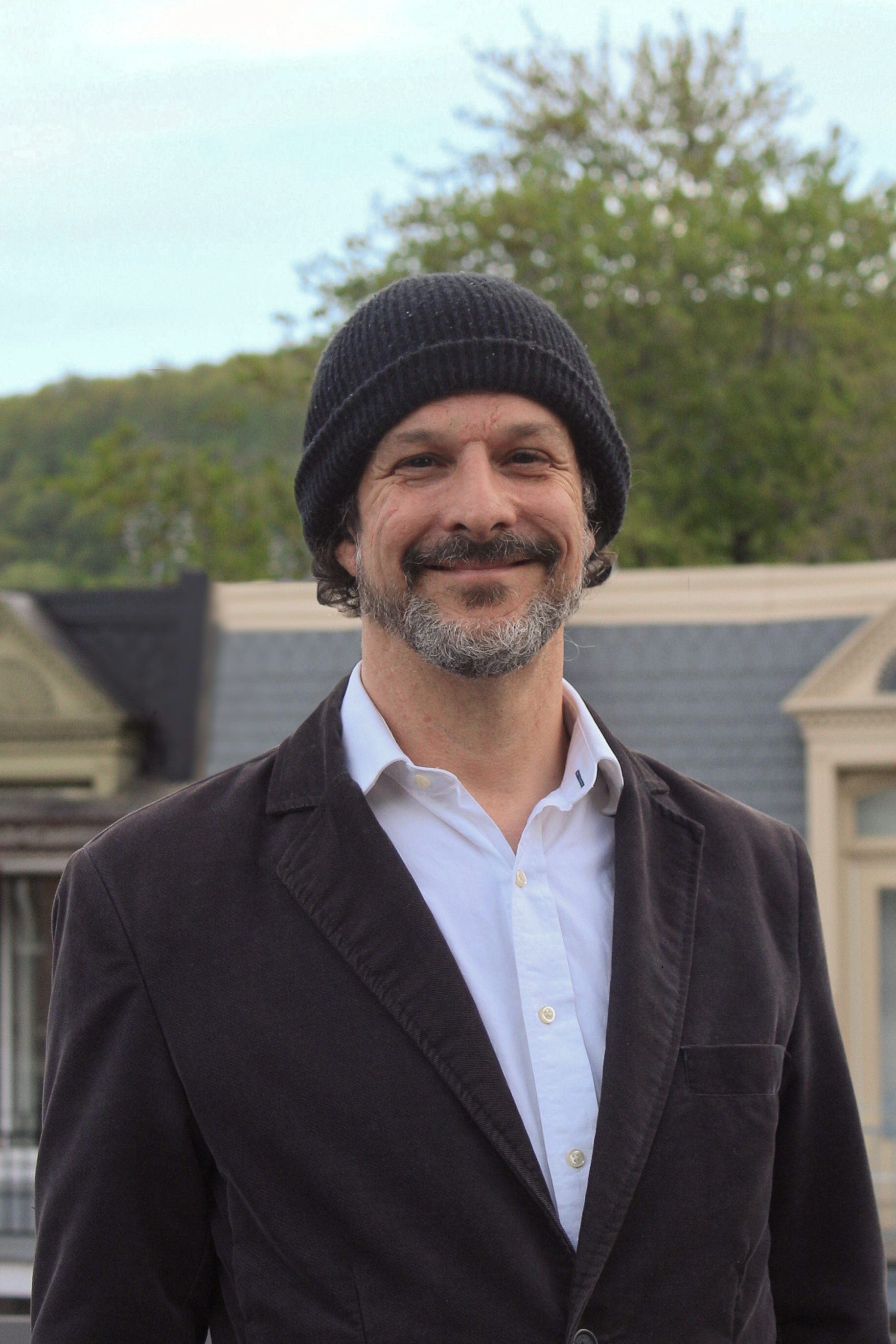
Dylan Perceval-Maxwell

Background

Dylan Perceval-Maxwell is a Montreal activist and businessman. He was the Green Party candidate in Laurier—Sainte-Marie five times from 1997 to 2008 and the candidate in Alfred-Pellan in 2011. His 2006 campaign is the subject of the NFB documentary Democracy 4 Dummies.

Candidacy announced: March 17, 2020
Candidacy approved: May 29, 2020
Disqualified: July 8, 2020
Campaign website: dylanperceval-maxwell.ca
Notes: Disqualified by the party after inappropriate statements going against the Greens' core values.

=== Julie Tremblay-Cloutier ===
Background

Julie Tremblay-Cloutier is a businesswoman from Oka who was the Green Party candidate for Mirabel in 2019, and a candidate for Oka City Council in 2017. Prior to entering politics, Tremblay-Cloutier was the head of a local pool and spa inspection company.

Candidacy announced: December 2, 2019
Withdrew: February 14, 2020
Notes: Withdrew citing the leadership election rules, her lack of experience and resources to do fundraisers, and her concern that ideas and debates would become secondary to raising funds.

=== Alex Tyrrell ===
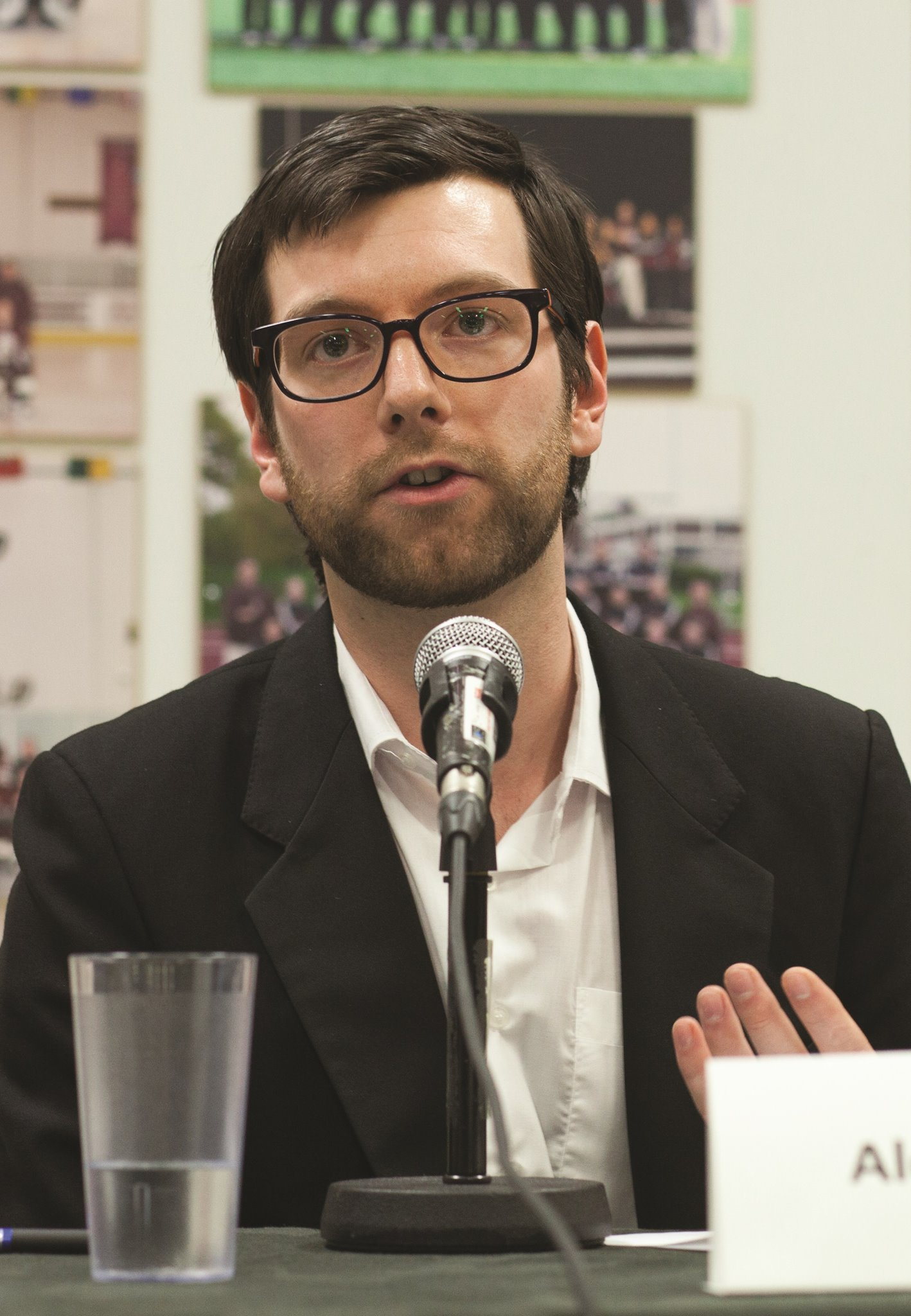
Alex Tyrrell

Background

Alex Tyrrell, 32, is the leader of the Green Party of Quebec (2013–present), and was the provincial candidate for Verdun in 2018, Notre-Dame-de-Grâce in 2014, and Jacques-Cartier in 2012. He was also the candidate in the Outremont, Chicoutimi, Gouin, Louis-Hébert, and Roberval by-elections in 2013, 2016, May 2017, October 2017 and 2018, respectively.

Candidacy announced: January 15, 2020
Withdrew: June 3, 2020
Endorsed: Dimitri Lascaris
Campaign website: alextyrrell.ca
Notes: Withdrew citing "Elizabeth May and her associates meddling in the election".

== Declined ==
- Jenica Atwin, MP for Fredericton (2019–2025)
- Peter Bevan-Baker, Leader of the Opposition in Prince Edward Island (2019–2023), Leader of the Green Party of Prince Edward Island (2012–2023), MLA for New Haven-Rocky Point (2019–present), MLA for Kellys Cross-Cumberland (2015–2019)
- David Coon, Leader of the Green Party of New Brunswick (2012–present), MLA for Fredericton South (2014–present)
- Daniel Green, Deputy Leader of the Green Party of Canada (2014–2019), candidate for Outremont in 2019, Saint–Laurent in 2017 and Ville-Marie—Le Sud-Ouest—Île-des-Sœurs in 2015.
- Luc Joli-Coeur, candidate for Québec in 2019, government manager for the Quebec Department of Finance and former political advisor under the Marois and Parizeau governments.
- Paul Manly, MP for Nanaimo—Ladysmith (2019–2021)
- Pierre Nantel, Green Party candidate for Longueuil—Saint-Hubert in 2019, former New Democratic MP for Longueuil—Saint-Hubert (2015–2019), Longueuil—Pierre-Boucher (2011–2015)
- Mike Schreiner, Leader of the Green Party of Ontario (2009–present), MPP for Guelph (2018–present)
- Shawn Setyo, Leader of the Saskatchewan Green Party (2016–2020)
- Andrew Weaver, Leader of the Green Party of British Columbia (2015–2020), MLA for Oak Bay-Gordon Head (2013–2020)
- Jody Wilson-Raybould, former Liberal cabinet minister and Independent MP for Vancouver Granville (2015–2021)
- Richard Zurawski, Halifax City Councillor for District 12, Green Party candidate for Halifax West in 2015 and 2019

== Endorsements ==
Courtney Howard

Provincial and territorial politicians: (1)

- Rylund Johnson (Northwest Territories MLA for Yellowknife North)

Former provincial and territorial politicians: (2)

- Peter Tretter (2006 Green Party of Ontario by-election candidate in Nepean—Carleton)
- James Marshall (2017 B.C. provincial election candidate in Vancouver-West End)

Former candidates: (2)

- Austin Mullins (2019 candidate in Banff—Airdrie)
- Tim Thompson (2019 candidate in Fundy Royal)

Total endorsements: 5

Amita Kuttner

Provincial and territorial politicians: (1)

- Sonia Furstenau (Leader of the Green Party of British Columbia; B.C. MLA for Cowichan Valley)

Municipal politicians: (3)

- Megan Curren (District of North Vancouver Councillor)
- David Demers (Vancouver Park Board Commissioner)
- Pete Fry (Vancouver City Councillor)

Former candidates: (7)

- Bridget Burns (2019 candidate for Vancouver East)
- Vincent J. Carbonneau (2018 Québec Green candidate for Mont-Royal–Outremont, 2015 candidate for Dorval—Lachine—LaSalle, Member of the National Executive of the GPQ and GPQ LGBTQ2+ spokesperson)
- Shannon Hawthorne (2019 candidate in Medicine Hat—Cardston—Warner)
- Ben Linnick (2015 candidate for Saint Boniface—Saint Vital)
- George Orr (2019 candidate for North Vancouver)
- Juan Vazquez (2019 candidate for Papineau and 2018 Green Party of Québec (GPQ) candidate for Laurier-Dorion)
- Marie Duplessis (2019 candidate for Trois-Rivières)

Other prominent individuals: (2)

- Anthony Hughes (Chairperson of the Green Party of Vancouver)
- Nicola Spurling (2020 BC Greens candidate in Coquitlam-Maillardville and Lower Mainland Representative to the BC Greens Provincial Council)

Total endorsements: 13

Dimitri Lascaris

Provincial and territorial politicians: (1)

- Alex Tyrrell (Leader of the Green Party of Quebec; former 2020 leadership candidate)

Municipal politicians: (1)

- Elizabeth Peloza (London City Councillor)

Former provincial and territorial politicians: (3)

- Stuart Parker (Former BC Greens leader, 1993–2000; 1996 candidate in Vancouver-Little Mountain; 1997 federal candidate for Vancouver East)
- Don Scott (Manitoba NDP MLA for Inkster, 1981–1988; Green Party vice-president, 2014–2016)
- Sharon Labchuk (Founder and former leader of the Green Party of Prince Edward Island)

Former candidates: (11)

- Joan Russow (Former Green Party leader, 1997–2001; 1997 and 2000 candidate for Victoria; 2000 candidate for Okanagan—Coquihalla)
- Colin Griffiths (2015 candidate for Pontiac)
- Matthew Peloza (2011 and 2015 candidate in London—Fanshawe)
- Richard Walsh (2015 candidate for Waterloo)
- David Doel (2015 candidate for Oakville, and YouTube political commentator)
- Robert Green (2015 candidate for Notre-Dame-de-Grâce—Westmount)
- Lisa Barrett (1997 candidate for West Vancouver—Sunshine Coast, 2019 candidate for Vancouver Centre, former Foreign Affairs critic for the GPC and mayor of Bowen Island)
- Carmen Budilean (2011 candidate for Saint-Lambert, 2015 candidate for Jonquière, board member of the Green Party of Quebec)
- David Weber (2015 and 2019 candidate for Kitchener South—Hespeler)
- Constantine Kritsonis (GPC candidate for York Centre in 1997, 2000, 2004 and 2006; former 2020 leadership candidate)
- Rowan Miller (2019 candidate in Tobique—Mactaquac)

Other prominent individuals: (7)

- Helen Caldicott (Australian physician, author, and anti-nuclear activist)
- Kim Goldberg (American Canadian writer and poet)
- Kevin Reynolds (Canadian Olympic medallist in figure skating)
- Sid Ryan (Former president of the Ontario Federation of Labour, 2009-2015; former president of CUPE-Ontario, 1992-2009; 2004 and 2006 NDP candidate for Oshawa)
- Sylvia McAdam Saysewahum (Co-founder of Idle No More)
- Ralph Shayne (Party Quebec-wing president)
- Roger Waters (Co-founder of rock band Pink Floyd)

Media: (1)

- Canadian Dimension

Total endorsements: 24

David Merner

Provincial and territorial politicians: (2)

- Naomi Hunter (Leader of Green Party of Saskatchewan, 2019 federal candidate in Regina—Lewvan)
- Evelyn Tanaka (Deputy leader of the Green Party of Alberta, 2019 federal candidate in Calgary Shepard)

Former MPs: (1)

- Bruce Hyer (MP for Thunder Bay—Superior North 2008-2015, former deputy leader of the Green Party of Canada)

Former provincial and territorial politicians: (4)

- Dennis Bayomi (2019 Green Party of Manitoba candidate in Kirkfield Park)
- Jean-Claude Bourque (1991 and 1993 by-election candidate for the New Brunswick New Democratic Party in Moncton North)
- James O'Grady (2018 Green Party of Ontario candidate in Nepean.
- Larry Neufeld (2016 Green Party of Saskatchewan candidate in Regina Lakeview)

Former candidates: (14)

- Olivier Adam (2015 candidate in Montarville)
- André Bélisle (2015 candidate in Bellechasse—Les Etchemins—Lévis)
- Jean Désy (2019 candidate in Rosemont—La Petite-Patrie)
- Judy N. Green (2019 candidate for West Nova; former 2020 leadership candidate)
- Maia Knight (2019 candidate for Ajax)
- Sylvie Lemieux (2011 and 2008 candidate in Glengarry—Prescott—Russell)
- Mark MacKenzie (Green Party President 2012-2013, 2011 candidate in Ottawa West—Nepean)
- Ralph Martin (2019 candidate for Wellington—Halton Hills)
- Simon McMillian (2015 candidate in Shefford)
- Suzanne de Montigny (2019 candidate in New Westminster—Burnaby)
- Natalie Odd (2019 candidate in Calgary Confederation)
- John Redins (2015 candidate in Ottawa South)
- Lorraine Rekmans (2019, 2018 by-election and 2015 candidate in Leeds—Grenville—Thousand Islands and Rideau Lakes).
- Victoria Serda (2006 candidate in Huron—Bruce)

Total endorsements: 21

Glen Murray

Provincial and territorial politicians: (1)

- Frank de Jong (Leader of the Yukon Green Party; former leader of the Green Party of Ontario, 1993-2009)

Municipal politicians: (2)

- Adriane Carr (Vancouver City Councillor 2011-2025 and former Leader of the Green Party of British Columbia)
- Leigh Bursey (Councillor, City of Brockville)

Former provincial and territorial politicians: (5)

- Dave Bagler (2011 and 2014 Green Party of Ontario candidate for Ottawa–Vanier; former party president)
- Peter Elgie (Former Deputy Leader of the Green Party of Ontario; former national party campaign chair)
- David Heurtel (Quebec Liberal MNA for Viau, 2013–2018; Minister of Sustainable Development, Environment, and the Fight Against Climate Change, 2014–2017; Minister of Immigration, Diversity, and Inclusion, 2017–2018)
- Bill Hewitt (Former Green Party of Ontario president)
- Kristopher Rivaud (2018 Green Party of Ontario candidate in Nipissing)

Former municipal politicians: (3)

- Rick Goldring (Mayor of Burlington 2010-2018)
- Maggie Laidlaw (Former Guelph city councillor)
- Donald Benham (Former Winnipeg city councillor)

Former candidates: (4)

- Louise Comeau (2015 candidate for Fredericton)
- Reuben DeBoer (2019 candidate for Eglinton-Lawrence)
- Peter Forint (2019 candidate for Pickering—Uxbridge)
- Gord Miller (Former Environmental Commissioner of Ontario; 1995 Ontario PC candidate for Cochrane South; 1997 candidate for Nipissing; 2015 candidate for Guelph; 2019 candidate for Parry Sound-Muskoka)

Other prominent individuals: (2)

- Laurie Arron (Former party executive director)
- Jordy Gold (Former deputy campaign manager for Saanich--Gulf Islands, 2011)

Total endorsements: 17

Annamie Paul

Provincial and territorial politicians: (3)

- Sonia Furstenau (Leader of the Green Party of British Columbia; B.C. MLA for Cowichan Valley)
- Abhijeet Manay (Deputy Leader of the Green Party of Ontario; 2018 candidate in Mississauga—Streetsville)
- Thomas Trappenberg (Leader of the Green Party of Nova Scotia; 2019 candidate in South Shore—St. Margarets)

Former provincial and territorial politicians: (6)

- James Mihaychuk (2011 Green Party of Ontario candidate in Ottawa South)
- Heather Morigeau (2019 Alberta Green candidate in Calgary-Buffalo)
- Luke Randall (2020 New Brunswick Green candidate in Fredericton North)
- Josephine Watson (2020 New Brunswick Green candidate in Moncton South)
- Josh Shaddick (2020 New Brunswick Green candidate in Miramichi)
- Susan Jonah (2020 New Brunswick Green candidate in Fredericton West-Hanwell)

Former candidates: (18)

- Raheem Aman (2019 candidate in Stormont—Dundas—South Glengarry)
- Jesse Brown (2019 candidate in Vancouver Centre)
- Max Chapman (2019 candidate in Algoma—Manitoulin—Kapuskasing)
- Sarah Climenhaga (2019 candidate in Toronto—St. Paul's)
- Hannah Conover-Arthurs (2019 candidate in Davenport)
- Victoria Galea (2019 candidate in Hamilton West—Ancaster—Dundas)
- Tim Grant (2019 candidate in University—Rosedale)
- Jocelyn Grosse (2019 candidate in Calgary Nose Hill)
- Jessica Hamilton (2019 candidate in Scarborough—Rouge Park)
- Racelle Kooy (2019 candidate in Victoria; Critic for Mental Health and Addictions)
- Dean Maher (2019 candidate in Spadina—Fort York)
- Oriana Ngabirano (2019 candidate in Ottawa—Vanier)
- Michelle Petersen (2019 candidate in Orléans)
- Christina Porter (2019 candidate in Mississauga—Malton)
- Cynthia Trentelman (2019 candidate in Mississauga—Lakeshore)
- Rebecca Wood (2019 candidate in York Centre)
- Singe Knutson (2019 candidate in Calgary Skyview)
- Mike Schmitz (2019 candidate in Humber River—Black Creek)

Other prominent individuals: (6)

- Adrian Currie (Ontario Representative for Green Party Federal Council)
- Juanita Goebertus (Green Alliance Member of the Columbian Chamber of Representatives for Bogotá)
- Magid Magid (Former UK Green Party MEP for Yorkshire and the Humber; former Lord Mayor of Sheffield)
- William Marshall (Co-founder of the Green Party of Canada)
- Tegan and Sara (Canadian musical group)
- R. H. Thomson (Canadian actor)

Organizations: (1)

- Operation Black Vote Canada

Total endorsements: 33

== Controversies ==
=== Endorsements ===
Former leader Elizabeth May was the subject of criticism over perceived implicit endorsements. Alex Tyrrell contended that May appeared with candidates at fundraisers to push them towards the lead. David Merner said it would be wiser for May to stay out of the contest completely. May responded that she was remaining neutral, but would help candidates from equity-seeking groups in fundraising efforts.

=== Racism ===
Candidate Meryam Haddad accused fellow candidate Dylan Perceval-Maxwell of racism for comments he made during a TVOntario debate. When asked about calls to defund the police, Perceval-Maxwell suggested having police officers "give $20 to every person of colour they stop". Haddad called the suggestion racist, and said it would not further the goal of ending systemic racism. Perceval-Maxwell suggested that Haddad was "angry that a white person came up with an idea." On July 8, the party announced that Perceval-Maxwell was no longer a candidate for the leadership, citing statements "not aligned with the party's values."

== See also ==
- Green Party of Canada leadership elections
- 2020 Green Party of British Columbia leadership election
- 2020 Conservative Party of Canada leadership election
