= Amita Kuttner =

Canadian astrophysicist and politician (born 1990)

Amita (Avi) Kuttner
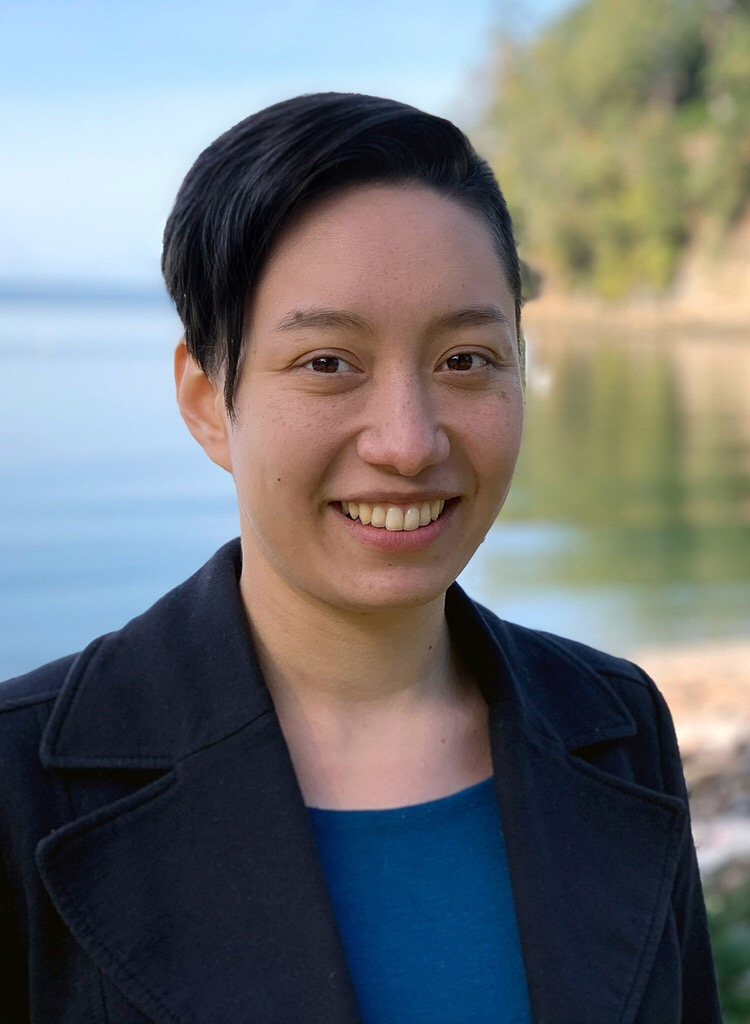

Interim Leader of the Green Party
- In office November 24, 2021 – November 19, 2022
- Preceded by: Annamie Paul
- Succeeded by: Elizabeth May and Jonathan Pedneault

Personal details
- Born: December 4, 1990 (age 35) North Vancouver, British Columbia, Canada
- Party: Green

Amita (Avi) Kuttner (/ˈɑːmitə/ AH-mee-tə; born December 4, 1990) is a Canadian astrophysicist, actor, and politician who served as the interim leader of the Green Party of Canada from November 24, 2021, to November 19, 2022. Kuttner first ran for office in the 2019 federal election, seeking a House of Commons seat as a Green candidate, followed by a run for Green Party leadership in 2020 following the election. They are the first transgender person and the first person of East Asian descent to lead a federal party in Canada.

== Background ==
Kuttner identifies as non-binary, transgender, and pansexual, and uses they/them and he/him pronouns. Kuttner was born in North Vancouver. Their mother, Eliza Kuttner (née Chiu) taught computer science at Capilano College and was an immigrant from Hong Kong. Kuttner's father immigrated to Canada from the United Kingdom. They graduated from a French immersion program.

In 2005, their mother was killed when a mudslide crashed down the west Seymour River escarpment into the family's home. Michael Kuttner, their father, survived but suffered serious injuries, and later sued the district for neglecting safety programmes around mudslides. Kuttner was attending boarding school in California when the mudslide occurred. Kuttner experienced PTSD as a result of the event.

== Education and scientific career ==
Kuttner attended the University of California, Santa Cruz (UCSC), where they earned a Ph.D. in astronomy and astrophysics and studied black holes in the early universe with Anthony Aguirre. They were a member of the Women in Physics and Astronomy group and co-founded the university's 314 Action group, which seeks to elect more scientists to public office in the United States.

Along with 20 other scientists, Kuttner co-signed a letter published in the journal, Science, in support of youth climate protesters, declaring that "we approve and support their demand for rapid and forceful action".

Kuttner is co-founder of the Moonlight Institute, a non-profit that aims to explore frameworks to adapt to the climate crisis. In April 2021, they were a panelist at Solve Climate by 2030, an event held at Toronto Metropolitan University.

== Political career ==
During the 2019 Canadian federal election, Kuttner was the Green Party candidate for the riding of Burnaby North—Seymour, finishing in fourth place, with 9.59 per cent of the vote, almost doubling the Green vote from the 2015 election. They served as the Green Party's Science and Innovation Critic from September 2018 to February 2020.

Kuttner ran in the 2020 Green Party leadership election. During the campaign, they refused to hold fundraising events with former leader Elizabeth May, saying the offer of assistance with fundraising does not address other systemic inequities in the race. They finished in sixth place, being eliminated in the fourth round with 7.32 per cent of the vote. In 2021, they told the Toronto Star that they had submitted an official complaint to the party's federal council about transphobia and racism that they experienced during the race, such as facing slurs during online party events.

Following the resignation of Annamie Paul, Kuttner was appointed by the Green Party federal council to serve as interim leader on November 24, 2021. Appointed at the age of 30, they were the youngest person to lead a federal political party, as well as the first transgender person and person of East Asian heritage.

In a press conference about a week after their appointment, Kuttner said they wanted to start the process of regrowth and to heal the party. The party had released a report indicating that it was threatened with insolvency, and was considering closing its office in Ottawa. The party had lost 499 monthly donors since July 2021, and 6,259 members in the same time. Kuttner acknowledged internal conflict over Annamie Paul's leadership had affected donations. The report blamed negotiations concerning Annamie Paul's departure as leader of the party for significant legal costs. In a December 2021 media interview, Kuttner said that the party's financial position was getting "back on track" and was "turning around" pointing to fundraising including at the party's virtual general meeting about a week earlier.

The party's constitution requires a leadership election to select a permanent leader to begin within six months of the appointment of an interim leader, and conclude within two years of their appointment. Kuttner has said they do not wish to be the permanent leader. In December 2021, Kuttner said they believed there should be a "longer period before launching a permanent leadership contest, and then a short leadership race".

In September 2022, Kuttner was misgendered by being referred to with female pronouns in a caption on a Green Party Zoom call connected with the leadership election. Kuttner stated that the use of female pronouns "made me feel hurt and isolated" and was "reflective of a larger pattern of behaviours that a few in the party are perpetuating". The party president Lorraine Rekmans subsequently resigned, stating that she had been unfairly blamed for the misgendering.

== Election record ==
2019 Canadian federal election: Burnaby North—Seymour
Party	Candidate	Votes	%	±%	Expenditures
Liberal	Terry Beech	17,770	35.50	–0.59	$93,319.78
New Democratic	Svend Robinson	16,185	32.33	+2.73	$97,660.91
Conservative	Heather Leung	9,734	19.45	–8.40	$92,995.62
Green	Amita Kuttner	4,801	9.59	+4.32	$13,982.95
People's	Rocky Dong	1,079	2.16	–	$7,115.13
Independent	Robert Taylor	271	0.54	–	none listed
Libertarian	Lewis C. Dahlby	219	0.44	–0.04	none listed
Total valid votes/expense limit		50,059	99.08	–	$106,341.17
Total rejected ballots		466	0.92	+0.43	
Turnout		50,525	64.80	–5.54	
Eligible voters		77,969			
Liberal hold		Swing		–1.66	
Heather Leung was dropped by the Conservative Party of Canada after past homophobic remarks were made public, but still appeared on the ballot papers.
Source: Elections Canada
