= Dimitri Lascaris =

Canadian socialist political activist (born 1963)

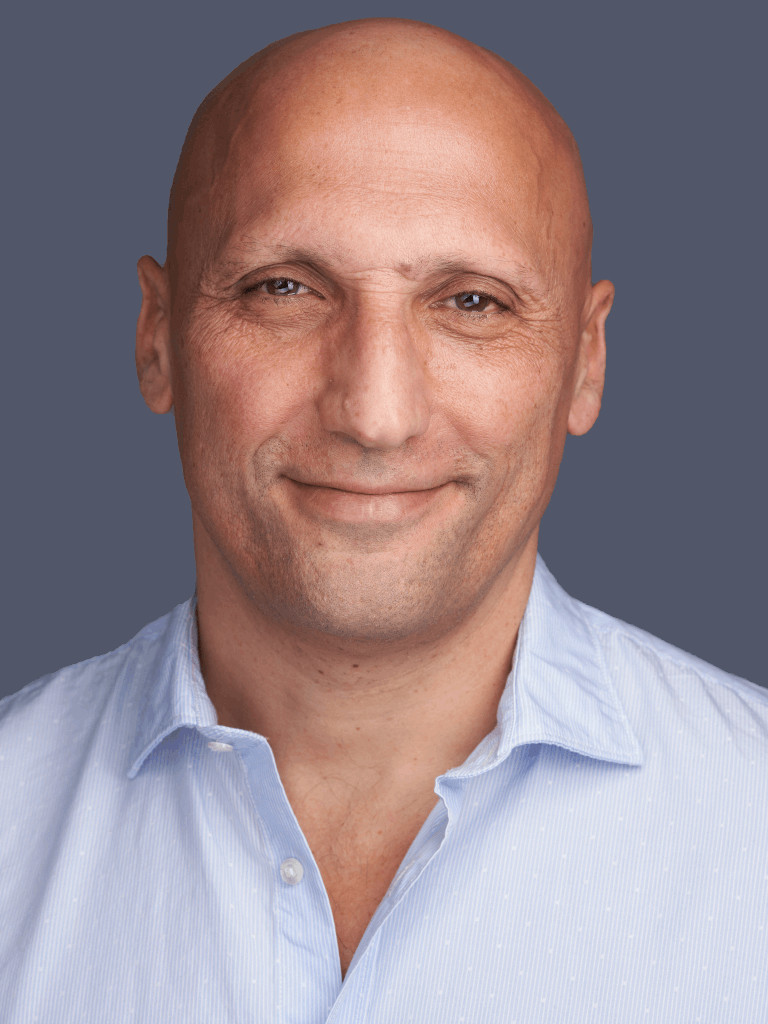
- Lascaris in 2020
- Born: Alexander Dimitri Lascaris; December 9, 1963 (age 62); London, Ontario, Canada
- Education: University of Toronto (JD)
- Occupations: Lawyer, journalist and political activist.
- Political party: Green Party of Canada; Green Party of Quebec

Alexander Dimitri Lascaris (born December 9, 1963) is a Canadian lawyer, journalist and political activist. Lascaris ran in the 2020 Green Party of Canada leadership election on an eco-socialist platform, placing second on the final ballot with 42 per cent of the vote. He has advocated for Palestinians and for better relations with Russia. He is fierce critic of Israel.

Lascaris was born in London, Ontario. Lascaris was raised Greek Orthodox but has been an atheist since the age of 18. He resides in Montreal, Quebec. He holds a J.D. degree from the University of Toronto. He was the federal candidate for London West in 2015 and the Justice Critic in the Green Party's shadow cabinet in 2016, and is a former member of the Quebec Greens' National Executive.

== Career ==
Lascaris started his legal career in 1991 at the Wall Street law firm Sullivan & Cromwell. After working from the firm’s New York and Paris, France offices for several years, Lascaris took a leave of absence from the legal profession to pursue a career as a high-stakes professional blackjack player.

Lascaris returned to the legal profession in 2004, when he joined the Canadian law firm Siskinds LLP. While at Siskinds, Lascaris led Canada's largest group of securities class action lawyers and recovered hundreds of millions of dollars on behalf of the firm's clients.

In 2012, Canadian Lawyer magazine named Lascaris as one of Canada's 25 most influential lawyers. In 2013, Canadian Business magazine named Lascaris as one of the 50 most influential persons in Canadian business. While at Siskinds, Lascaris was quoted extensively in the Canadian media on issues relating to capital markets, securities fraud, and class actions. The media organizations that cited his work and commentary included The Globe and Mail, The Financial Post, the CBC and the Toronto Star.

Lascaris retired from Siskinds in 2015 to pursue independent journalism and to devote more time to activism and pro bono legal work.

From 2015 to 2022, Lascaris served as a board member and correspondent of The Real News Network. In 2024, Lascaris established a YouTube channel, Reason2Resist, which focuses on geopolitics from an anti-imperialist perspective. In 2024, Lascaris received the Serena Shim Award for Uncompromised Integrity in Journalism.

Lascaris has been a pro-Palestinian activist and a supporter of the Boycott, Divestment and Sanctions against Israel. In 2019, he sued B'nai Brith Canada for defamation after it accused him of using social media “to advocate on behalf of terrorists who have murdered Israeli civilians”. The lawsuit was settled in 2021, with B'nai Brith agreeing to delete the writings in question from its website and compensate Lascaris for his legal fees.

Lascaris has been a passenger on the Gaza Freedom Flotilla. On a pro bono basis, he has pursued numerous lawsuits on behalf of Palestinians and Palestinian solidarity activists, including a lawsuit alleging that Canada’s government is violating the Genocide Convention, a lawsuit pertaining to the fraudulent labelling of Israeli settlement wines sold in Canada, and a lawsuit alleging that Toronto Metropolitan University defamed ten law students when it falsely accused them of antisemitism.

In an opinion piece for the National Post, freelance writer and weekly columnist Adam Zivo accused Lascaris of uncritically accepting pro-Russian narratives. According to Zivo, Lascaris visited Russia and defended its position following the 2022 Russian invasion of Ukraine. Lascaris went on a speaking tour across Canada in the summer of 2023 to "report back" on what he called his "mission of peace to Russia".
