= 2026 New Democratic Party leadership election =

Canadian political party election

- March 29, 2026

50%+1 of the final ballot needed to win
- Registered: 100,542
- Turnout: 70.55% (▲16.6pp)
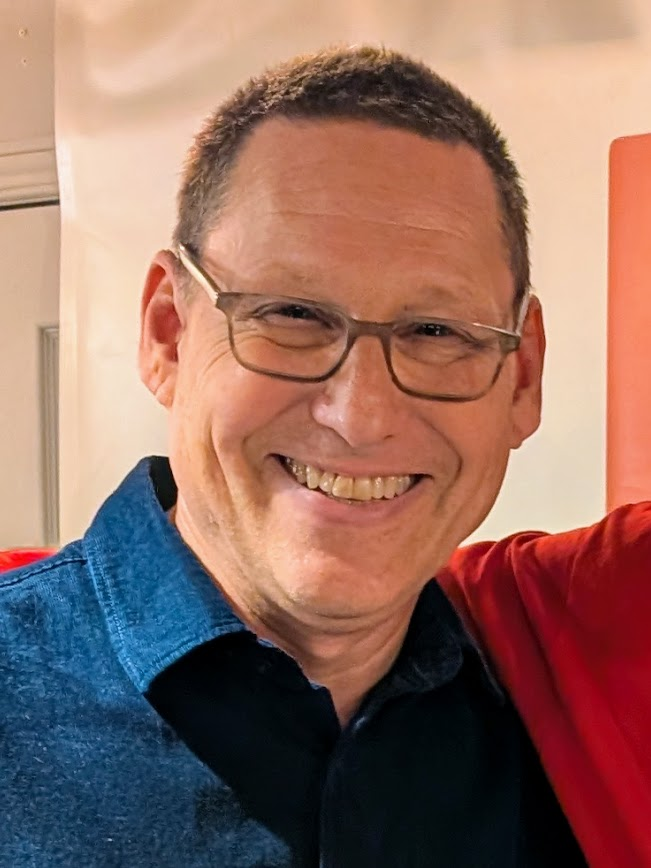

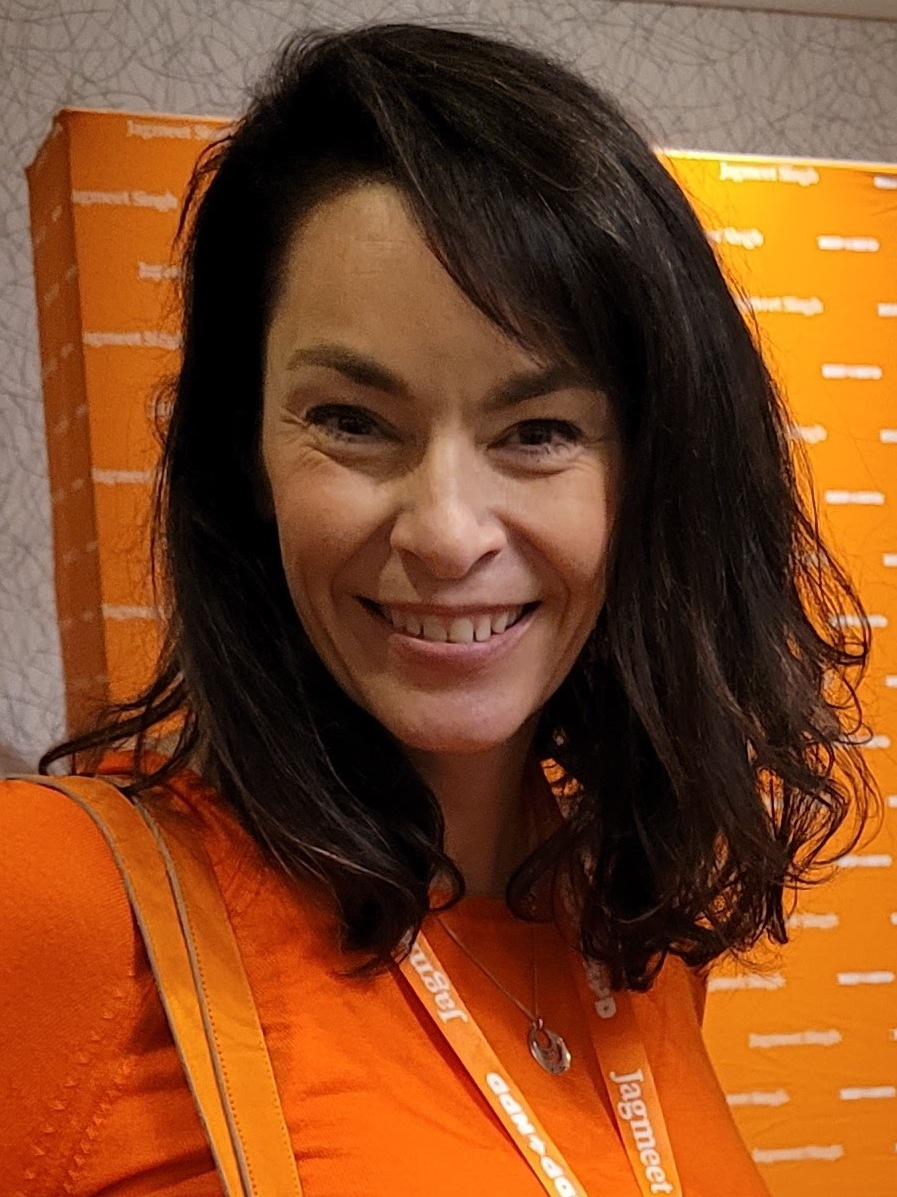

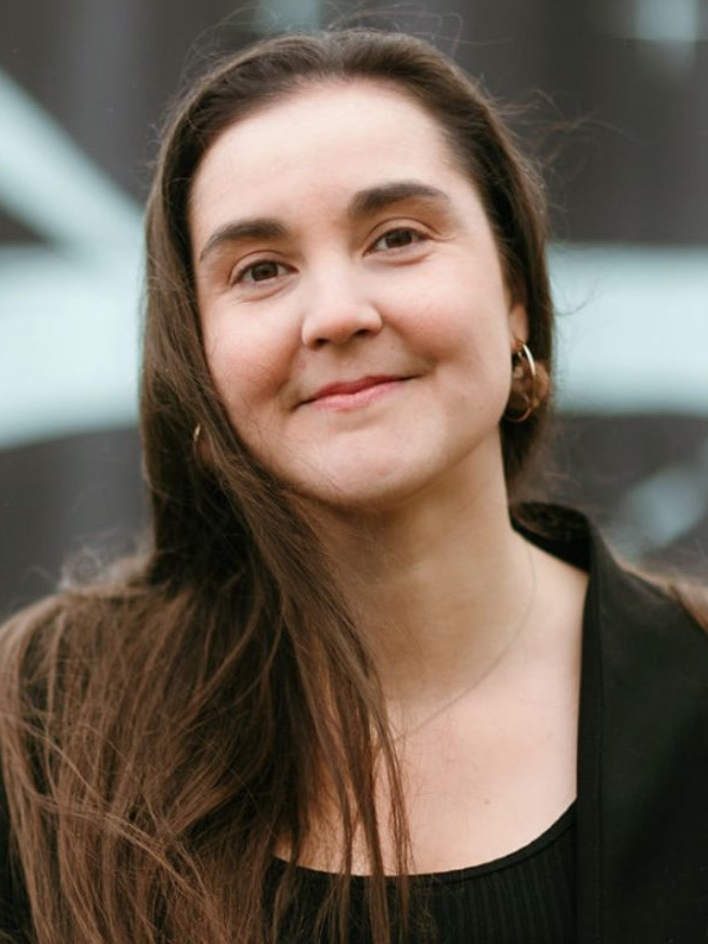

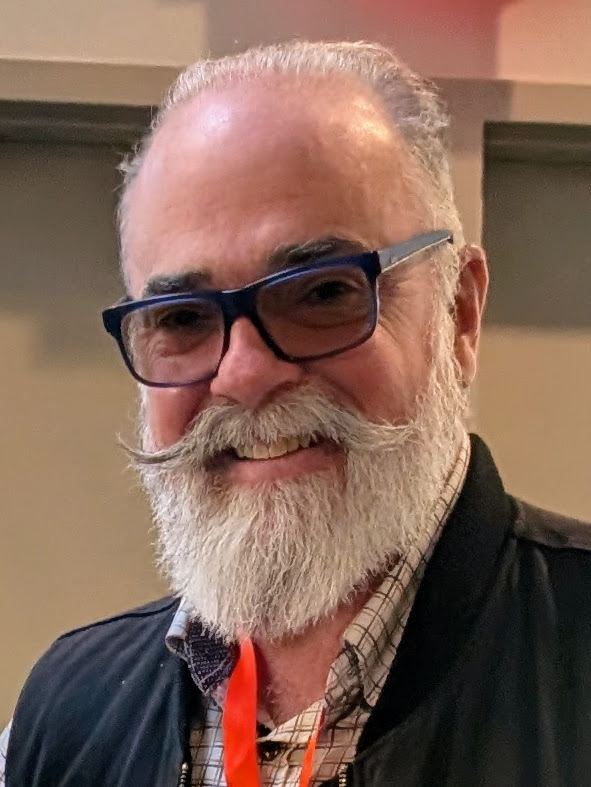

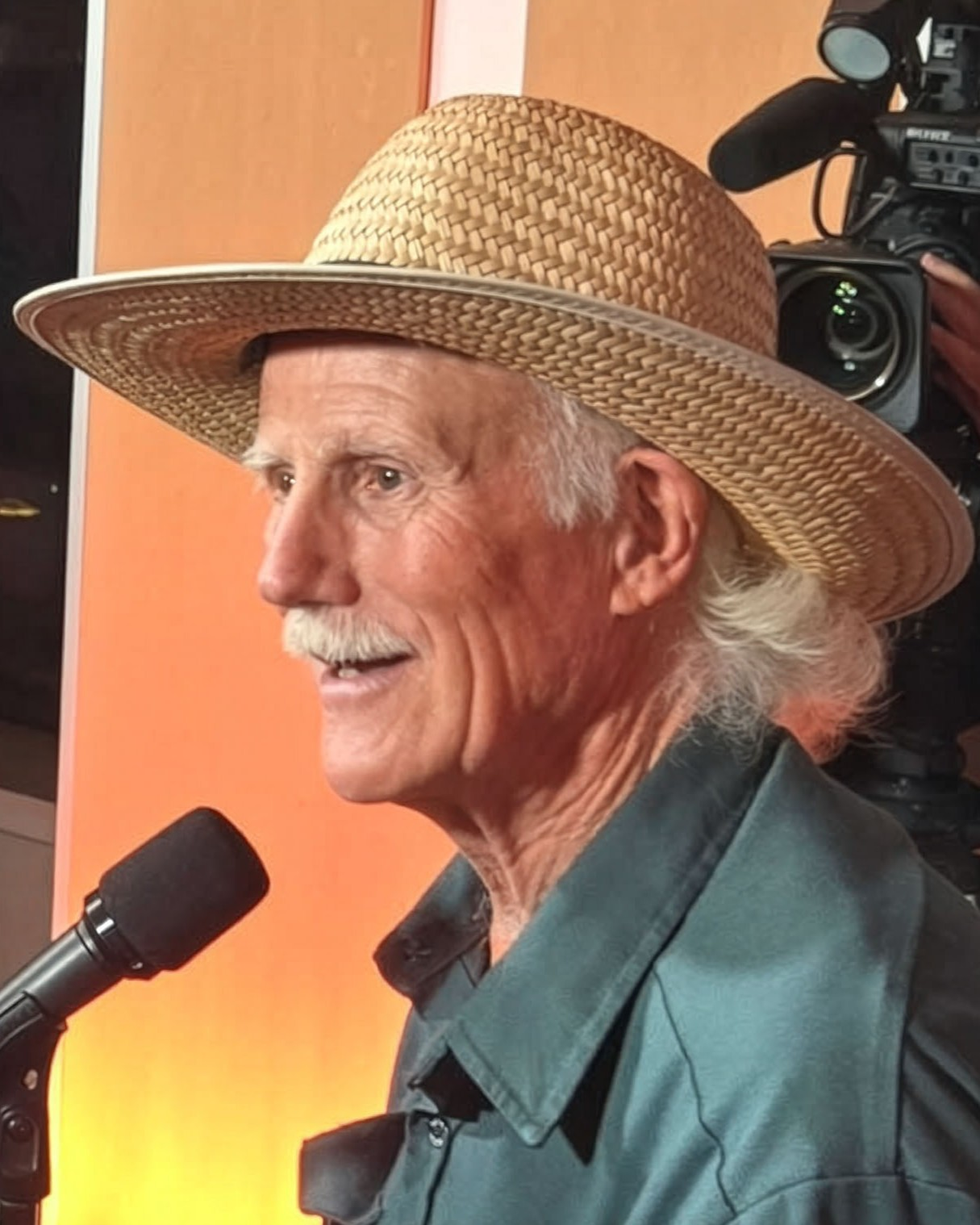
Candidate	Avi Lewis	Heather McPherson	Tanille Johnston
Popular vote	39,734	20,899	5,159
Percentage	56.02%	29.46%	7.27%
Candidate	Rob Ashton	Tony McQuail
Popular vote	4,193	945
Percentage	5.91%	1.33%
Leader before election
Don Davies (interim)
Elected leader
Avi Lewis

2026 New Democratic Party leadership election
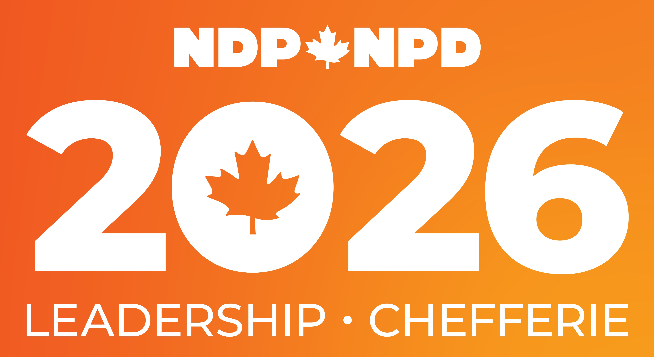
- Date: March 29, 2026 (Note: The NDP's federal convention was held between March 27–29, 2026, with the leadership convention occurring at the end of the convention.)
- Convention: RBC Convention Centre, Winnipeg
- Resigning leader: Jagmeet Singh
- Won by: Avi Lewis
- Ballots: 1
- Candidates: 5
- Entrance fee: $100,000 (Note: Paid over four instalments.)
- Spending limit: $1,500,000

From March 9 to March 28, 2026, members of the New Democratic Party of Canada (NDP) voted in a leadership election to choose a permanent leader to replace Don Davies, who became leader on an interim basis following the resignation of Jagmeet Singh. Singh announced his resignation after being defeated in the 2025 Canadian federal election.

On March 29, Avi Lewis, the grandson of former party leader David Lewis and son of former Ontario NDP leader Stephen Lewis, was announced as the winner of the ranked-choice voting (RCV) election with 56% of the first ballot vote. The election saw the highest number of votes cast and largest margin of victory in an NDP leadership election under the one member, one vote system.

== Background ==
Jagmeet Singh was elected as the leader of the New Democratic Party (NDP) in the 2017 leadership election. He led the party in the 2019, 2021, and 2025 federal elections. On March 22, 2022, the NDP reached a confidence and supply agreement with the governing Liberal Party of Canada, agreeing to support the government until June 2025 in exchange for specific policy commitments. On September 4, 2024, the NDP withdrew from their confidence-and-supply agreement with the Liberals, though they did not commit to a motion of non-confidence.

While the NDP under Singh stagnated in most opinion polls following the 2021 federal election, the party experienced a brief jump in support to second place following the collapse of the governing Liberal Party, during the 2024–2025 political crisis. However, following Prime Minister Justin Trudeau's resignation in January and Mark Carney's election as Liberal leader, the NDP collapsed in most polls, with most of its support going to the Liberals.

At the 2025 federal election, Singh led the NDP to its worst result in party history, both in seat count and popular vote, losing official party status and himself having been defeated in the riding of Burnaby Central. On election night, he announced that he would resign as party leader. On May 5, 2025, he was replaced by Vancouver Kingsway MP Don Davies on an interim basis until a new party leader is elected.

== Rules ==
Under rules set out in the party's constitution, every member is entitled to cast a secret ballot for the selection of the leader. The new leader will be chosen at a leadership convention through a combination of ranked ballots and round-by-round voting. If a leader is not chosen in the first round, additional vote counts will occur until a candidate obtains 50 per cent plus one vote and is declared the leader. Voters can vote online, by telephone, by mail, and in-person at the convention, with the voting period being from March 9 to 28.

Candidates will be required to pay a $100,000 entry fee, which will be due in four instalments, and abide by a $1,500,000 spending limit. The $100,000 entrance fee has been criticized by some of the party's grassroots. The entrance fee marked a $70,000 increase over the prior $30,000 entrance fee in the 2017 NDP leadership election. One quarter of all donations to candidates will be paid to the party. To be nominated, candidates require at least 500 signatures from party members, at least half of which must be from female-identified members and at least 100 from "other equity-seeking groups," including Indigenous people, LGBTQIA2S+ people, persons with disabilities, and visible minorities. At least 50 signatures will be required from each of five regions: the Atlantic, Quebec, Ontario, the Prairies, and British Columbia/the North. In addition, 10 per cent of the signatures must come from Canada's Young New Democrats.

Members must join the party at least 60 days prior to the vote, an earlier eligibility cutoff compared to the 45 days prescribed by the rules of the 2017 contest and the 35 days in the 2012 contest.

Because membership is controlled by provincial and territorial branches, the voting age varies from 12 to 14 years old, depending on where the member lives. (Note: 12 in British Columbia and Yukon, 13 in Ontario and Saskatchewan, and 14 in the remaining provinces and territories.)

Due to allegations of foreign interference in past Canadian federal leadership races, the party's federal council announced in July 2025 that "strong regulations will govern the role of third parties in the race."

== Campaign ==
Following the party's poor election showing, several commentators and party members pointed to organizational and strategic shortcomings, including leadership fatigue, messaging issues, overreliance on social media and identity politics, and difficulty balancing support between urban progressives and working-class voters. Some called for renewed grassroots engagement and stronger ties to organized labour, while others suggested the creation of a New Progressive Party, possibly including closer cooperation or a merger with the Green Party to consolidate progressive support. Failure to obtain over 10% of the vote in all but 46 ridings meant many candidates did not receive campaign reimbursements, exacerbating concerns about financial challenges. Internal disputes and a shrinking activist base further complicated the party's path forward ahead of the 2026 leadership race.

Following Singh's announcement, political commentators suggested that several figures were likely candidates: Alexandre Boulerice, Nathan Cullen, Leah Gazan, Matthew Green, Jenny Kwan, Avi Lewis, Heather McPherson, Rachel Notley, and Valérie Plante. Boulerice, Cullen, Green, Notley, and Plante all declined to run before the start of the campaign period. McPherson's supporters publicly called on her to run in the election shortly following Singh's resignation. In late August 2025, representatives on behalf of Lewis and McPherson began collecting signatures before the launch of the leadership election on September 2.

On June 23, Tony McQuail, an environmentalist and farmer, announced his campaign. He was approved to run on October 9. He suspended fundraising on November 20, to prevent splitting grassroots donations with Tanille Johnston. Shortly before the first debate on November 27, he resumed fundraising. McQuail would again suspend fundraising on December 23, with him resuming on December 28.

On July 3, activist Yves Engler announced his candidacy, backed by the NDP Socialist Caucus; he submitted his application to the NDP's leadership vote committee for vetting on November 10. His application was rejected on December 8, 2025. However, his wife Bianca Mugyenyi announced her candidacy shortly before the deadline to apply on January 1, 2026. Her application was also rejected on January 28 on the grounds of being a "proxy candidate".

On September 19, Avi Lewis, an activist and journalist, announced his campaign. Lewis is also the son of former Ontario NDP leader Stephen Lewis and grandson of former federal NDP leader David Lewis. His campaign launch was held in Toronto.

In an interview on May 20 with CBC News' Power & Politics, Heather McPherson, the MP for Edmonton Strathcona, confirmed she was seriously considering running for the leadership. She announced her leadership bid on September 28, at an event in Edmonton. During the campaign, she faced criticism due to her comments on "purity tests" in the party.

On September 30, it was reported that McPherson had raised nearly $100,000, followed by Lewis with around $55,500, Ashton with around $25,000, and Johnston with around $1,700. Lewis reported having the most individual donors with 353, followed by McPherson with 231 and Ashton with 45.

On October 1, Rob Ashton, president of the International Longshore and Warehouse Union Canada, announced his campaign in Toronto. His campaign would notably be endorsed by the United Steelworkers trade union.

On October 8, Tanille Johnston, city councillor in Campbell River, announced her campaign in Nanaimo. Johnston, a member of the We Wai Kai First Nation, is the first Indigenous woman to seek the NDP leadership.

The first all-candidates forum took place in Nanaimo on October 16, with Rob Ashton and Tanille Johnston attending in person, and the other candidates speaking via Zoom. The Canadian Labour Congress hosted the first fully in-person forum on October 22, in Ottawa. Ashton, Lewis, and McPherson gathered in Ottawa for the Douglas Coldwell Layton Foundation leadership forum on October 28, while McQuail and Johnston attended virtually. On November 22, all the candidates, except Tony McQuail, gathered virtually in Gibsons for a leadership forum. On November 27, the candidates all gathered in Montreal for the first debate; it was held using a mix of French and English. The debate was noted for none of the candidates being fluent in French, with most reading prepared French statements before switching to English. The debate was followed by an all-candidates forum hosted by the Ontario NDP's northern caucus in December 2025, and a town hall hosted by the Canadian Union of Public Employees on January 7, 2026. On January 10, the Ontario New Democratic Youth hosted an in-person debate in Toronto. Johnston, Lewis, and McQuail attended a forum hosted by the Democratic Socialists of Vancouver on January 15. The Canadians for Justice and Peace in the Middle East hosted a virtual debate on January 21, with all candidates except Ashton attending. Another forum was held in Calgary, on February 12. The second official leadership debate took place in New Westminster on February 19. The next day on February 20, an in-person debate was held in Victoria. The Elmwood—Transcona NDP EDA hosted an all-candidates forum on February 25. On March 2, Leadnow hosted a virtual debate. The NDP Equity Commissions hosted a virtual forum on March 11. The Edmonton Centre NDP EDA hosted an all-candidates forum in Edmonton on March 13. The Jeunes néodémocrates du Québec (Young New Democrats of Quebec) hosted a virtual all-candidates forum on March 15.

At the end of December 2025, Elections Canada reported that Lewis had raised $778,869, with McPherson trailing at $415,490. Ashton had raised $231,095, Johnston had raised $142,129, and McQuail had raised $95,093. By the end of January 2026, it was reported that Lewis's campaign had raised over $1,000,000.

On January 11, Ashton's campaign was criticized for answering questions on Reddit using generative AI, despite his criticism of the technology. He previously made headlines for stating that Lewis's style of leadership would "divide" the party.

In March 2026, the party reported that its membership had risen to approximately 100,000 before the vote. On March 11, 2026, Nunavut MP Lori Idlout defected from the NDP to the Liberal Party; she had previously appeared at a Lewis campaign event in Ottawa. On March 16, 2026, the Toronto Star reported that McPherson's campaign had approached Ashton to form an electoral pact; Ashton's campaign declined the request. Tony McQuail and Tanille Johnston had previously cross endorsed each other. On March 28, a candidate showcase took place during the party's convention in Winnipeg, in the last event before the leadership announcement. Shortly before the end of the campaign, it was reported that Lewis had raised nearly $1.5 million with over 11,000 donors, followed by McPherson with over $700,000 and over 4,000 donors. Ashton raised nearly $400,000 with over 2,300 donors, Johnston raised nearly $200,000 with nearly 2,000 donors, and McQuail raised over $120,000 with over 1,000 donors.

== Timeline ==
=== 2025 ===
- April 28 – The 2025 Canadian federal election was held. The New Democratic Party was reduced to seven seats and lost official party status for the first time since 1993. Party leader Jagmeet Singh, who was defeated in Burnaby Central, announced that he would step down once an interim leader was appointed.
- May 5 – The party's federal council named Don Davies, MP for Vancouver Kingsway, as interim leader following consultations with the party's parliamentary caucus.
- May 10 – NDP MPs Leah Gazan, Lori Idlout, and Jenny Kwan write a letter to the party's executive and council saying they were not properly consulted in the selection of Davies as interim leader. The letter says that the party executive and other MPs did not hold caucus discussions or provide a timeline. In a statement for a May 16 story in The Globe and Mail, NDP national director Lucy Watson said that the federal council had sole responsibility for choosing an interim leader under the constitution.
- June 23 – Environmentalist and farmer Tony McQuail announces his intention to run for the NDP leadership.
- July 3 – Activist Yves Engler announces his intention to run for the NDP leadership.
- July 10 – The party's federal council meets to discuss a schedule and logistics for the leadership election; it decides the campaign period will be between September 2025 and March 2026. It also decides that the convention will be held concurrently with the party's federal convention in Winnipeg, Manitoba.
- August 20 – Leadership application package available.
- September 2 – Leadership campaign period start date.
- September 19 – Activist and journalist Avi Lewis announces his candidacy for the NDP leadership.
- September 28 – MP for Edmonton Strathcona Heather McPherson announces her candidacy for the NDP leadership.
- October 1 – Union leader and longshoreman Rob Ashton announces his candidacy for the NDP leadership.
- October 8 – City councillor Tanille Johnston announces her candidacy for the NDP leadership.
- October 9 – Tony McQuail's candidacy is approved by the NDP's leadership vote committee.
- October 16 – The Nanaimo—Ladysmith NDP EDA hosted an all-candidates forum.
- October 22 – Leadership candidate forum hosted by the Canadian Labour Congress.
- October 28 – Candidates forum hosted by the Douglas Coldwell Layton Foundation.
- October 31 – Deadline for the second $25,000 instalment of the deposit fee.
- November 10 – Yves Engler submits his application to enter the leadership contest.
- November 20 – Tony McQuail temporarily suspends fundraising, encouraging supporters to donate to Tanille Johnston instead.
- November 22 – The West Vancouver—Sunshine Coast—Sea to Sky Country NDP EDA hosted an all-candidates forum.
- November 27 – First official leadership debate. Tony McQuail resumes fundraising.
- December 2 – The Ontario NDP Northern Caucus hosted an all-candidates forum.
- December 8 – The NDP sends Yves Engler a letter confirming his ineligibility to run after an independent review committee upheld an earlier decision by the NDP's vetting committee.
- December 23 – Tony McQuail again temporarily suspends fundraising, encouraging supporters to donate to Tanille Johnston instead.
- December 28 – Tony McQuail resumes fundraising.
- December 30 – Deadline for the third $25,000 instalment of the deposit fee.
- December 31 – Bianca Mugyenyi submits her application to run as a candidate.

=== 2026 ===
- January 1 – Deadline for leadership candidate application documents to have been completed and received by the Leadership Vote Committee.
- January 7 – The Canadian Union of Public Employees hosts a virtual all-candidates forum.
- January 10 – The Ontario New Democratic Youth held a debate in Toronto.
- January 15 – Democratic Socialists of Vancouver host a virtual forum.
- January 21 – Canadians for Justice and Peace in the Middle East hosts a virtual debate.
- January 28 – Membership cut-off date. Fourth $25,000 installment of the deposit fee is due Bianca Mugyeni's rejection by the leadership vote committee is announced.
- January 31 – Candidate registration deadline. Five candidates confirmed.
- February 12 – The Calgary Confederation NDP EDA hosted an all-candidates forum.
- February 19 – Second official leadership debate in New Westminster.
- February 20 – The Victoria NDP EDA held an in-person debate.
- February 25 – The Elmwood—Transcona NDP EDA hosted an all-candidates forum.
- March 2 – Leadnow hosted a virtual debate.
- March 9 – Voting opens at 12:01 a.m. ET.
- March 10 – Nunavut MP Lori Idlout crosses the floor to the Liberals.
- March 11 – The NDP Equity Commissions hosted an all-candidates forum.
- March 13 – The Edmonton Centre NDP EDA hosted an all-candidates forum in Edmonton.
- March 15 – The Jeunes néodémocrates du Québec (Young New Democrats of Quebec) hosted a virtual all-candidates forum.
- March 27 – NDP federal convention began.
- March 28 – Final day of voting in leadership election. Voting closed at 7 p.m. ET. Candidate showcase.
- March 29 – Avi Lewis wins the leadership race with 56% of the vote. Final day of federal convention.

== Candidates ==
=== Approved ===
Candidates who were approved by the party's leadership vote committee and paid the $100,000 deposit fee. As of October 14, 2025, all five approved candidates—Ashton, Johnston, Lewis, McPherson, and McQuail—also registered their campaigns with Elections Canada.

Candidate	Background	Candidacy	Campaign	Ref.
Rob Ashton	President of the International Longshore and Warehouse Union Canada (2016–present)	Announced: October 1, 2025 Campaign slogan: A Voice for Everyday People Campaign slogan (French): Une voix pour les gens ordinaires	Endorsements; Website	
Tanille Johnston	Campbell River City Councillor (2022–present); Candidate in North Island—Powell River (2025)	Announced: October 8, 2025 Campaign slogan: Forward. Together. Campaign slogan (French): Avancer. Ensemble.	Endorsements; Website	
Avi Lewis	Candidate in Vancouver Centre (2025) and West Vancouver—Sunshine Coast—Sea to Sky Country (2021); Co-creator of the Leap Manifesto (2015)	Announced: September 19, 2025 Campaign slogan: For the Many, not the Money Campaign slogan (French): Pour les gens, pas l'argent	Endorsements; Website	
Heather McPherson	MP for Edmonton Strathcona (2019–present); Foreign Affairs Critic (2021–2025); Whip of the NDP (2024–2025)	Announced: September 28, 2025 Campaign slogan: Change Starts with Us Campaign slogan (French): À nous le changement	Endorsements; Website	
Tony McQuail	Five-time federal NDP candidate in Huron—Bruce; Three-time Ontario NDP candidate in Huron—Bruce; Executive assistant to former Ontario Agriculture minister Elmer Buchanan (1990–1995); Three-term Huron County Board of Education trustee	Announced: June 23, 2025 Approved: October 9, 2025 Campaign slogan: From the Ground Up Campaign slogan (French): Depuis la base (translation)	Endorsements; Website	

=== Failed to qualify ===
- Yves Engler, author, activist, and founder of the Canadian Foreign Policy Institute. Nominated by the NDP Socialist Caucus, his campaign was announced on July 3, 2025. Application submitted on November 10, 2025, and rejected on November 25, 2025. Appeal rejected on December 8, 2025. He was deemed ineligible by both the party's vetting committee and independent review committee, alleging he had "harassed, intimidated, and confronted" elected officials, and repeated disinformation in the Russian invasion of Ukraine, favouring Russia.
- Bianca Mugyenyi, coordinator of Concordia University's Gender Advocacy Centre, former director of the Canadian Foreign Policy Institute, co-founder of the Leap with Avi Lewis and Naomi Klein, wife of rejected applicant Yves Engler. Her campaign was announced January 5, 2026. Rejection of candidacy by the vetting committee announced on January 28, 2026, she was deemed ineligible for being "an explicit proxy" for Yves Engler.

=== Declined ===
- Charlie Angus, MP for Timmins—James Bay (2004–2025), runner up in the 2017 leadership election. (Endorsed McPherson)
- Alexandre Boulerice, deputy leader of the NDP (2019–2026), house leader of the NDP (2025–2026), MP for Rosemont-La Petite-Patrie (2011–present).
- Ruth Ellen Brosseau, MP for Berthier—Maskinongé (2011–2019), House Leader of the NDP (2018–2019).
- Guy Caron, Mayor of Rimouski (2021–present), MP for Rimouski-Neigette—Témiscouata—Les Basques (2011–2019), parliamentary leader of the NDP (2017–2019), finished fourth in the 2017 leadership election.
- Olivia Chow, 66th Mayor of Toronto (2023–present), MP for Trinity—Spadina (2006–2014), widow of former federal NDP leader Jack Layton.
- Nathan Cullen, MP for Skeena—Bulkley Valley (2004–2019), MLA for Stikine (2020–2024), finished third in the 2012 leadership election. (Endorsed McPherson)
- Don Davies, interim leader of the NDP (2025–2026), MP for Vancouver Kingsway (2008–present).
- David Eby, 37th Premier of British Columbia (2022–present), leader of the British Columbia New Democratic Party (2022–present), MLA for Vancouver-Point Grey (2013–present).
- Leah Gazan, MP for Winnipeg Centre (2019–present), Families, Children, and Social Development Critic (2019–present). (Endorsed Lewis)
- Matthew Green, MP for Hamilton Centre (2019–2025), Hamilton city councillor (2014–2018).
- Lori Idlout, MP for Nunavut (2021–present).
- Gord Johns, MP for Courtenay—Alberni (2015–present). (Endorsed McPherson)
- Peter Julian, MP for New Westminster—Burnaby (2004–2025), House Leader of the NDP (2014–2016, 2017–2018, 2019–2025).
- Wab Kinew, 25th Premier of Manitoba (2023–present), leader of the New Democratic Party of Manitoba (2017–present), MLA for Fort Rouge (2016–present).
- Jenny Kwan, MP for Vancouver East (2015–present), MLA for Vancouver-Mount Pleasant (1996–2015), British Columbia cabinet minister (1998–2001).
- Mike Layton, Toronto City Councillor (2010–2022), son of former federal NDP leader Jack Layton.
- Tom Mulcair, Leader of the Opposition (2012–2015), leader of the NDP (2012–2017), MP for Outremont (2007–2018).
- Rachel Notley, 17th Premier of Alberta (2015–2019), leader of the Alberta New Democratic Party (2014–2024), MLA for Edmonton-Strathcona (2008–2024). (Endorsed McPherson)
- Valérie Plante, 45th Mayor of Montreal (2017–2025).
- Kennedy Stewart, 40th Mayor of Vancouver (2018–2022), MP for Burnaby South (2011–2018).
- Bonita Zarrillo, MP for Port Moody-Coquitlam (2021–2025), Coquitlam City Councillor (2013–2021). (Endorsed Ashton)

== Endorsements ==
Rob Ashton

Former members of Parliament

- Laurin Liu, MP for Rivière-des-Mille-Îles (2011–2015)
- Bonita Zarrillo, MP for Port Moody-Coquitlam (2021–2025)

Members of provincial and territorial legislatures

- George Anderson, MLA for Nanaimo-Lantzville (2024–present)
- Rohini Arora, MLA for Burnaby East (2024–present)
- Mike Farnworth, MLA for Port Coquitlam (1991–2001, 2005–present), British Columbia Government House Leader (2024–present), Deputy Premier of British Columbia (2021–2024)
- Suzy Hansen, MLA for Halifax Needham (2021–present)
- Susan Leblanc, MLA for Dartmouth North (2017–present)
- Darlene Rotchford, MLA for Esquimalt-Colwood (2024–present)
- Janet Routledge, MLA for Burnaby North (2017–present)
- Jamie West, MPP for Sudbury (2018–present)
- Paul Wozney, MLA for Sackville-Cobequid (2024–present)

Former provincial and territorial politicians

- Harry Bains, MLA for Surrey-Newton (2005–2024)
- Andrew Mercier, MLA for Langley (2020–2024), British Columbia Cabinet Minister (2022–2024)
- Monique Taylor, MPP for Hamilton Mountain (2011–2025)

Other prominent individuals

- Bea Bruske, president of the Canadian Labour Congress

Organizations

- Canadian Union of Public Employees Saskatchewan
- United Food and Commercial Workers Canada
- United Steelworkers
Tanille Johnston

Provincial and territorial politicians

- Lisa Lachance, MLA for Halifax Citadel-Sable Island (2021–present), Nova Scotia Opposition House Leader (2025–present)

Former provincial and territorial politicians

- Eric Robinson, MLA for Keewatinook (1993–2016), Deputy Premier of Manitoba (2009–2016)

Other prominent individuals

- Tony McQuail (second choice)
Avi Lewis

Members of Parliament

- Leah Gazan, MP for Winnipeg Centre (2019–present)

Former members of Parliament

- Alex Atamanenko, MP for British Columbia Southern Interior (2006–2015)
- Libby Davies, MP for Vancouver East (1997–2015), NDP deputy leader (2007–2015)
- Svend Robinson, MP for Burnaby—Douglas (1979–2004), runner up in the 1995 leadership election
- Bill Siksay, MP for Burnaby—Douglas (2004–2011)

Members of provincial and territorial legislatures

- Jessica Bell, MPP for University—Rosedale (2018–present)
- Lise Vaugeois, MPP for Thunder Bay—Superior North (2022–present)

Former provincial and territorial politicians

- Jill Andrew, MPP for Toronto—St. Paul's (2018–2025)
- Jennifer Bowes, MLA for Saskatoon University (2020–2024)
- Gary Burrill, MLA for Halifax Chebucto (2017–2024), MLA for Colchester-Musquodoboit Valley (2009–2013), Leader of the Nova Scotia New Democratic Party (2016–2022)
- David Chudnovsky, MLA for Vancouver-Kensington (2005–2009)
- Cheri DiNovo, MPP for Parkdale—High Park (2006–2017), withdrawn candidate in the 2017 leadership race
- Joel Harden, MPP for Ottawa Centre (2018–2025)
- Amir Khadir, MNA for Mercier (2008–2018), Co-spokesperson of Québec solidaire (2006–2012)
- Stephen Lewis, MPP for Scarborough West (1963–1978), leader of the Ontario New Democratic Party (1970–1978), Leader of the Official Opposition of Ontario (1975–1977) (candidate's father)
- Gene Long, MHA for St. John's East (1986-1989).
- Flor Marcelino, MLA for Wellington (2007–2011), MLA for Logan (2011–2019), Interim Leader of the Manitoba New Democratic Party (2016–2017), Manitoba Cabinet Minister (2009–2016)
- Lorraine Michael, MHA for St. John's East-Quidi Vidi (2006–2019), former Leader of the New Democratic Party of Newfoundland and Labrador (2006-2015)
- Sheilagh O'Leary, MHA for St. John's East-Quidi Vidi (2025-), deputy mayor of St. John's (2017–2025)
- Jan Pullinger, MLA for Nanaimo (1989–1991), MLA for Cowichan-Ladysmith (1991–2001), British Columbia Cabinet Minister (1996–2000)
- Gerry Rogers, MHA for St. John's Centre (2011-2019), former Leader of the New Democratic Party of Newfoundland and Labrador (2018-2019)

Municipal politicians

- Shawn Menard, Ottawa City Councillor (2018–present)
- Sean Orr, Vancouver City Councillor (2025–present)

Other prominent individuals

- Anjali Appadurai, politician, climate activist, and disqualified candidate in the 2022 BC NDP leadership election
- Cory Doctorow, blogger, journalist, and science fiction author
- Naomi Klein, author and filmmaker (candidate's wife)
- Nimâ Machouf, epidemiologist and co-president of the NDP Quebec section
- Yann Martel, author
- Gabor Maté, physician and author
- Bill McKibben, author
- Linda McQuaig, journalist and columnist
- Sid Ryan, former president of the Ontario Federation of Labour and CUPE Ontario.
- David Suzuki, environmentalist and broadcaster

Organizations

- Canadian Union of Public Employees Ontario
Heather McPherson

Members of Parliament

- Gord Johns, MP for Courtenay—Alberni (2015–present)

Former members of Parliament

- Charlie Angus, MP for Timmins—James Bay (2004–2025), runner up in the 2017 leadership election
- Dawn Black, MP for New Westminster—Coquitlam (2006–2009), MLA for New Westminster (2009–2013), Interim leader of the British Columbia New Democratic Party (2011)
- Lisa Marie Barron, MP for Nanaimo—Ladysmith (2021–2025)
- Richard Cannings, MP for South Okanagan—West Kootenay (2015–2025)
- Raymond Côté, MP for Beauport—Limoilou (2011–2015)
- Robert Chisholm, MP for Dartmouth—Cole Harbour (2011–2015), MLA for Halifax Atlantic (1991–2003), Leader of the Nova Scotia New Democratic Party (1996–2000)
- Nathan Cullen, MP for Skeena—Bulkley Valley (2004–2019), MLA for Stikine (2020–2024), finished third in the 2012 leadership election
- Leila Dance, MP for Elmwood—Transcona (2024–2025)
- Linda Duncan, MP for Edmonton Strathcona (2008–2019)
- Jack Harris, MP for St. John's East (1987–1988, 2008–2015, 2019–2021), MHA for Signal Hill-Quidi Vidi (1990–2006), Leader of the Newfoundland and Labrador New Democratic Party (1992–2006)
- Carol Hughes, MP for Algoma—Manitoulin—Kapuskasing (2008–2025)
- Lynn Hunter, MP for Saanich—Gulf Islands (1988–1993)
- Pat Martin, MP for Winnipeg Centre (1997–2015)
- Lindsay Mathyssen, MP for London—Fanshawe (2019–2025)
- Douglas Roche, MP for Edmonton Strathcona (1972–1979), MP for Edmonton South (1979–1984), Senator from Alberta (1998–2004) (sat as a member of the Progressive Conservative Party)
- Nycole Turmel, MP for Hull—Aylmer (2011–2015), Interim leader of the NDP (2011–2012), Leader of the Official Opposition (2011–2012)
- Judy Wasylycia-Leis, MP for Winnipeg North (2004–2010), MP for Winnipeg North Centre (1997–2004), MLA for St. Johns (1986–1993), Manitoba Minister of Culture, Heritage and Recreation (1986–1988)

Members of provincial and territorial legislatures

- Chandra Pasma, MPP for Ottawa West—Nepean (2022–present)
- Joan Phillip, MLA for Vancouver-Strathcona (2023–2026)
- Amna Shah, MLA for Surrey City Centre (2024–2026)
- Rod Wilson, MLA for Halifax Armdale (2024–present)
- Kristyn Wong-Tam, MPP for Toronto Centre (2022–present)

Former provincial and territorial politicians

- Mike Harcourt, MLA for Vancouver Centre (1986–1991), MLA for Vancouver-Mount Pleasant (1991–1996), Premier of British Columbia (1991–1996), Leader of the British Columbia New Democratic Party (1987–1996), Mayor of Vancouver (1981–1986)
- Vivienne Horne, MLA for Spruce Grove-St. Albert (2015–2019)
- Danielle Larivee, MLA for Lesser Slave Lake (2015–2019)
- Brian Mason, MLA for Edmonton-Highlands (2000–2004), MLA for Edmonton-Highlands-Norwood (2004–2019), Leader of the Alberta New Democratic Party (2004–2014), Alberta Minister of Transportation (2015–2019)
- Shelley Martel, MPP for Sudbury East (1987–1999) and Nickel Belt (1999–2007)
- Rachel Notley, MLA for Edmonton-Strathcona (2008–2024), Premier of Alberta (2015–2019), leader of the Alberta New Democratic Party (2014–2024)
- Shannon Phillips, MLA for Lethbridge-West (2015–2024), Alberta Minister of the Environment (2015–2019)
- Tom Sigurdson, MLA for Edmonton-Belmont (1986–1993)
- Cathy Sproule, MLA for Saskatoon Nutana (2011–2020)
- Nicole Rancourt, MLA for Prince Albert Northcote (2016–2020)
- Bob Wanner, MLA for Medicine Hat (2015–2019), Speaker of the Legislative Assembly of Alberta (2015–2019)
- Elizabeth Weir, MLA for Saint John South (1991–1995), MLA for Saint John Harbour (1995–2005), Leader of the New Brunswick New Democratic Party (1988–2005)

Other prominent individuals

- Stewart Phillip, Grand Chief and president of the Union of British Columbia Indian Chiefs (1998–present)
Tony McQuail

Other prominent individuals

- Tanille Johnston (second choice)

== Debates and forums ==
Debates and forums among candidates for the 2026 New Democratic Party leadership election
Type	Date	Location	Host	Language	Moderator	Participants — P Participant I Invited N Not invited A Absent invitee O Out of race (withdrawn or disqualified)				
Type	Date	Location	Host	Language	Moderator	Ashton	Johnston	Lewis	McPherson	McQuail
Forum	October 16, 2025	Nanaimo, British Columbia	Nanaimo—Ladysmith NDP EDA	English	Lisa Marie Barron	P	P	P	P	P
Forum	October 22, 2025	Ottawa, Ontario	Canadian Labour Congress	English & French	Bea Bruske	P	P	P	P	P
Forum	October 28, 2025	Ottawa, Ontario	Douglas Coldwell Layton Foundation	English	Brad Lavigne	P	P	P	P	P
Forum	November 22, 2025	Gibsons, British Columbia	West Vancouver—Sunshine Coast—Sea to Sky Country NDP EDA	English	Jäger Rosenberg	P	P	P	P	O (Note: Campaign paused)
Debate	November 27, 2025	Montreal, Quebec	New Democratic Party	English & French	Karl Bélanger	P	P	P	P	P
Forum	December 2, 2025	Virtual	Ontario NDP Northern Caucus	English	Lynn Dee Eason & Luke Hildebrand	P	P	P	P	P
Forum	January 7, 2026	Virtual	Canadian Union of Public Employees	English & French	Mark Hancock & Candace Rennick	P	P	P	P	P
Debate	January 10, 2026	Toronto, Ontario	Ontario New Democratic Youth & Ontario NDP Toronto Area Council	English	Doly Begum & Mike Layton	P	P	P	P	P
Forum	January 15, 2026	Virtual	Democratic Socialists of Vancouver	English	Joey Broda	A	P	P	A	P
Debate	January 21, 2026	Virtual	Canadians for Justice and Peace in the Middle East	English	Yara Shoufani	A	P	P	P	P
Forum	February 12, 2026	Calgary, Alberta	Calgary Confederation NDP EDA	English	Keira Gunn	P	P	P	P	P
Debate	February 19, 2026	New Westminister, British Columbia	New Democratic Party	English & French	Hannah Thibedeau	P	P	P	P	P
Debate	February 20, 2026	Victoria, British Columbia	Victoria NDP EDA	English	Laurel Collins	P	P	P	P	P
Forum	February 25, 2026	Virtual	Elmwood—Transcona NDP EDA	English		P	P	P	P	P
Debate	March 2, 2026	Virtual	Leadnow	English	Desmond Cole	P	P	P	P	P
Forum	March 11, 2026	Virtual	NDP Equity Commissions	English	Phoenix The Fire	P	P	P	P	P
Forum	March 13, 2026	Edmonton, Alberta	Edmonton Centre NDP EDA	English		P	P	P	P	P
Forum	March 15, 2026	Virtual	Jeunes néodémocrates du Québec	English & French		P	P	P	P	P

== Opinion polling ==
Polling firm	Last date of polling	Sample size	Link	Margin of error	Ashton	Johnston	Lewis	McPherson	McQuail	Other	Lead
Angus Reid Institute	March 17, 2026	225	PDF	N/A	5%	5%	18%	10%	2%	60%	8%

== Results ==
2026 New Democratic Party leadership election
Candidate	First ballot	
Candidate	Votes	%
Avi Lewis	39,734	56.02%
Heather McPherson	20,899	29.46%
Tanille Johnston	5,159	7.27%
Rob Ashton	4,193	5.91%
Tony McQuail	945	1.33%
Total valid votes	70,930	99.99%
Rejected ballots	4	0.01%
Turnout	70,934	70.55%
Eligible voters	100,542	
Source: New Democratic Party

Of the total number of votes, 68,754 were cast online, 1,252 were cast by telephone, and 928 were mail-in votes.

Lewis got over 56% of the vote on the first ballot, meaning subsequent ballots did not need to be counted, but it was reported he was the second vote of most Johnston, McQuail, and McPherson voters. He received the highest number of votes for a leadership candidate in NDP history.

== Aftermath ==
Prime Minister Mark Carney and leader of the Opposition Pierre Poilievre congratulated Lewis on his victory.

Alberta NDP leader Naheed Nenshi and Saskatchewan NDP leader Carla Beck criticized the direction of the federal party, particularly Lewis's natural resource policies. Meanwhile, Ontario NDP leader Marit Stiles, Manitoba NDP leader Wab Kinew, Nova Scotia NDP leader Claudia Chender, Yukon NDP leader Kate White, Newfoundland and Labrador NDP leader Jim Dinn, New Brunswick NDP leader Alex White and British Columbia NDP leader David Eby congratulated Lewis on his victory.

Just two days after Avi Lewis's victory, his father, former Ontario NDP leader and former Ambassador to the United Nations Stephen Lewis, died following a several-year bout with abdominal cancer.

== See also ==
- New Democratic Party leadership elections
- New Democratic Party candidates in the 2025 Canadian federal election
- New Democratic Party Shadow Cabinet of the 45th Parliament of Canada
