= Endorsements in the 2017 New Democratic Party leadership election =

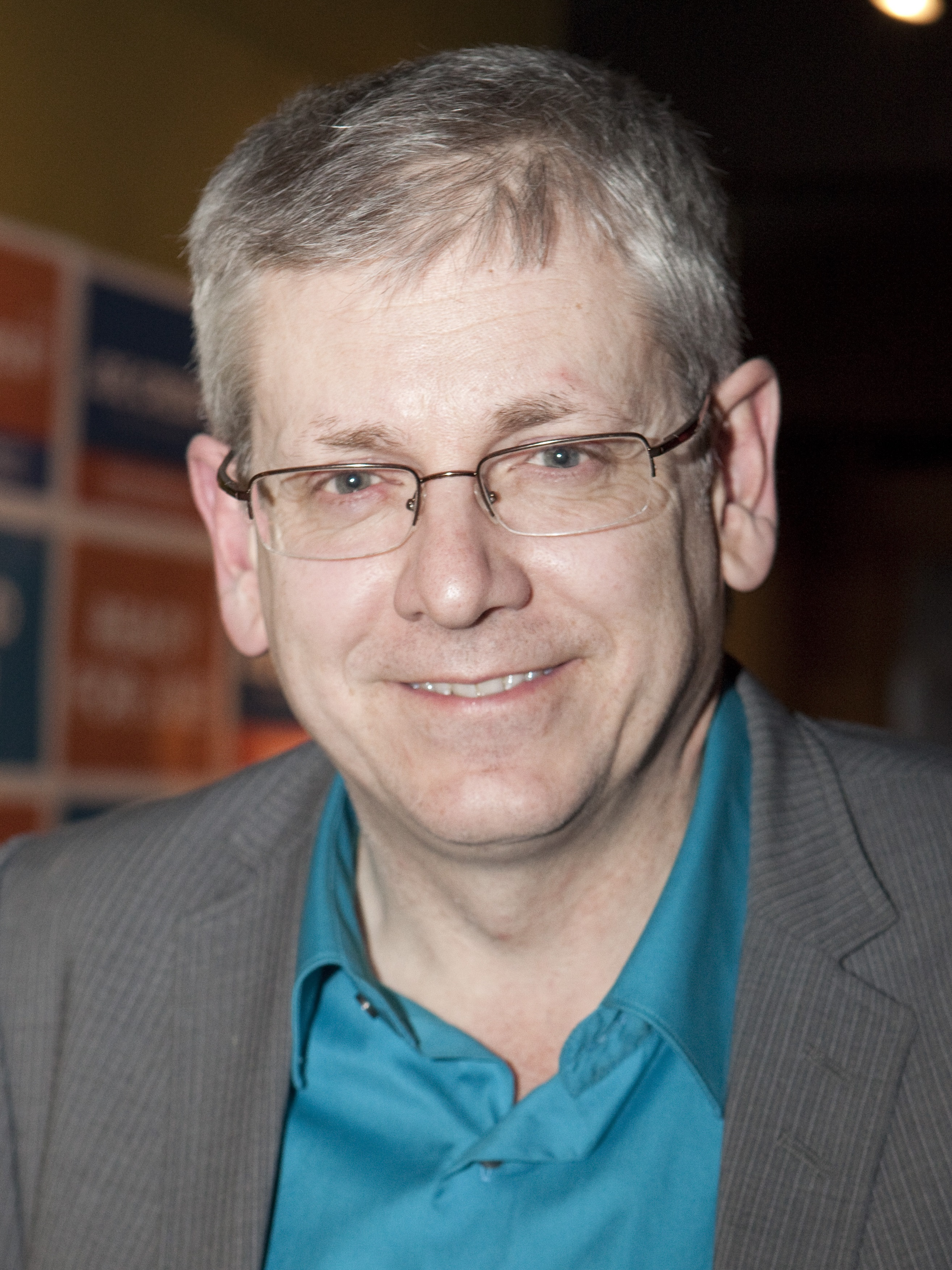
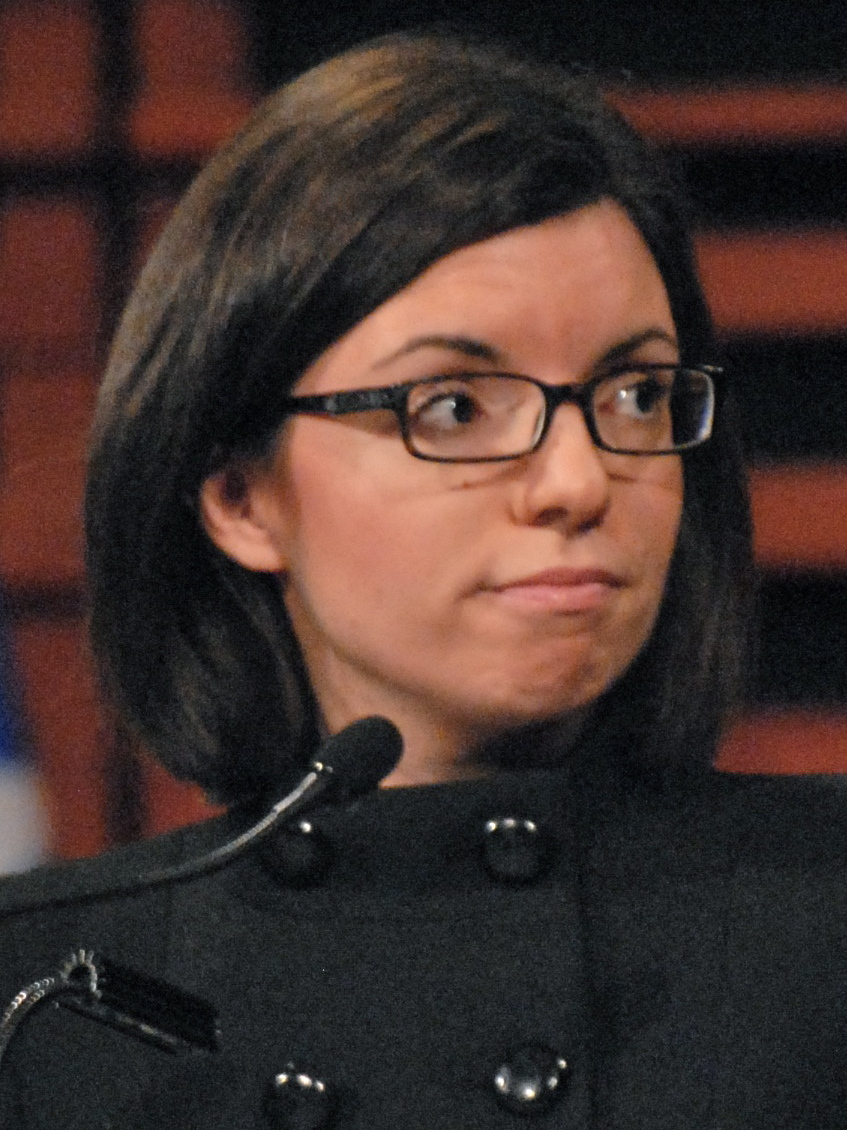
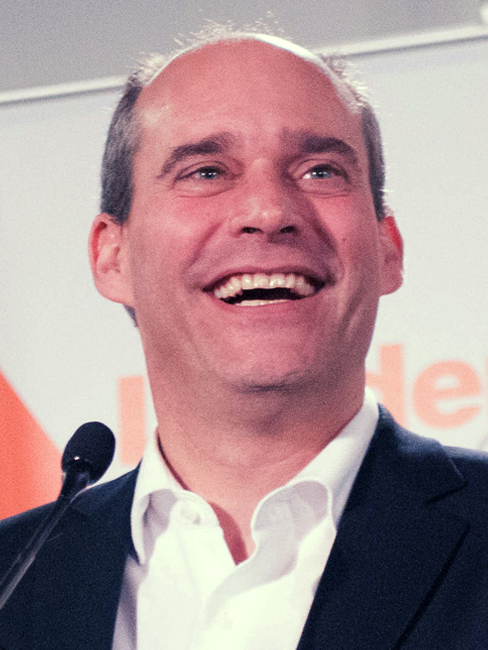
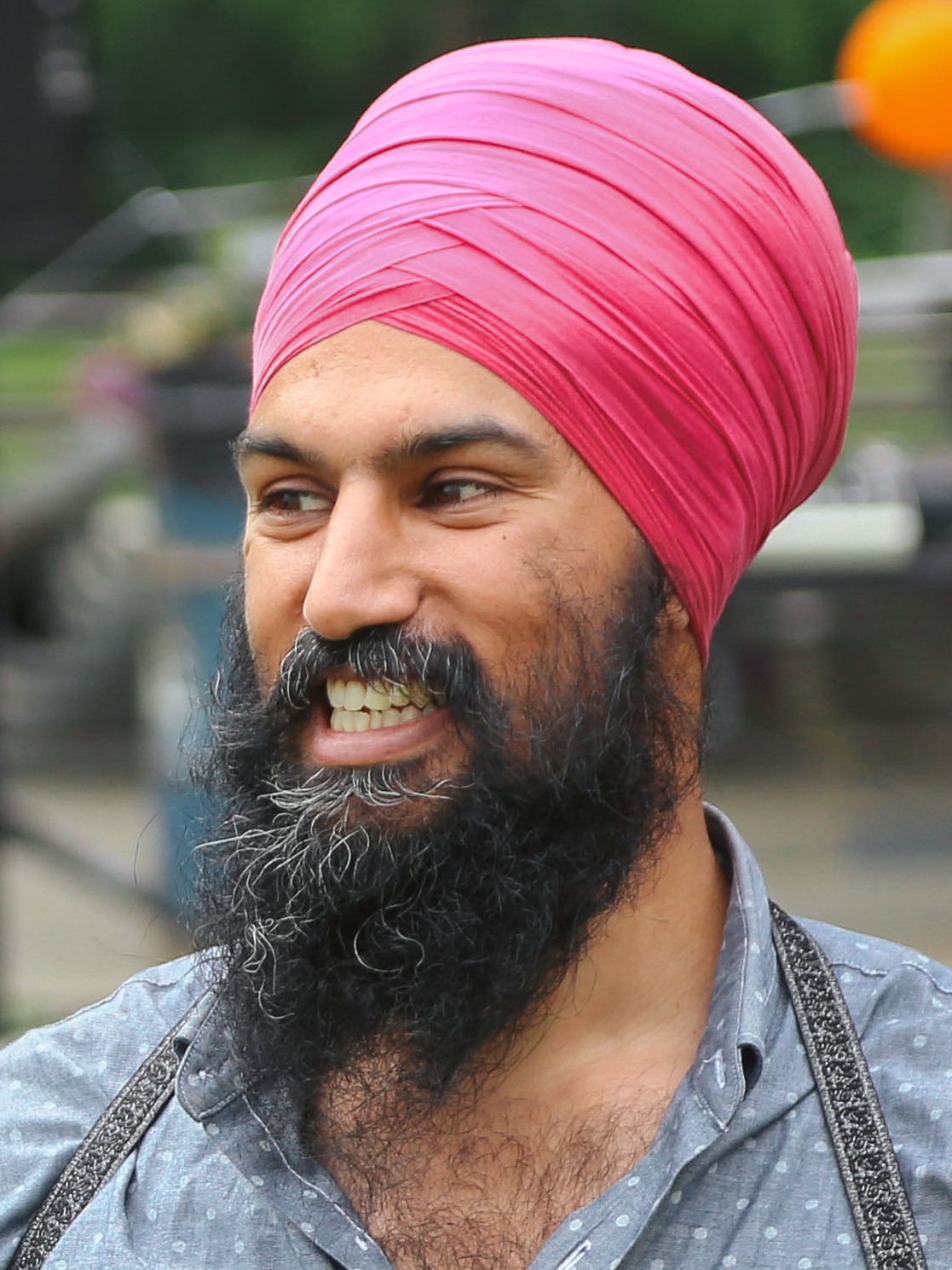
Candidates for the 2017 leadership election.
From left to right: Angus, Ashton, Caron, Singh.

This is a list of notable individuals and entities who provided endorsements to declared candidates in the Canadian 2017 New Democratic Party leadership election or had their expression of support reported in the media.

== Charlie Angus ==
=== Members of Parliament ===
- Carol Hughes, MP for Algoma—Manitoulin—Kapuskasing (2008–2025).
- Christine Moore, MP for Abitibi—Témiscamingue (2011–2019).

=== Former Members of Parliament ===
- Malcolm Allen, MP for Welland (2008–2015).
- Catherine Bell, MP for Vancouver Island North (2006–2008).
- Charmaine Borg, MP for Terrebonne—Blainville (2011–2015).
- Andrew Cash, MP for Davenport (2011–2015).
- Libby Davies, MP for Vancouver East (1997–2015).
- Ray Funk, MP for Prince Albert—Churchill River (1988–1993).
- Claude Gravelle, MP for Nickel Belt (2008–2015).
- Matthew Kellway, MP for Beaches—East York (2011–2015).
- Wayne Marston, MP for Hamilton East—Stoney Creek (2006–2015).
- Pat Martin, MP for Winnipeg Centre (1997–2015).
- Rod Murphy, MP for Churchill (1979–1993).
- Jamie Nicholls, MP for Vaudreuil-Soulanges (2011–2015).
- Djaouida Sellah, MP for Saint-Bruno—Saint-Hubert (2011–2015).
- Mike Sullivan, MP for York South—Weston (2011–2015).
- Tony Martin, MP for Sault Ste. Marie (2004–2011).

=== Provincial politicians ===
- Buckley Belanger, MLA for Athabasca.
- Gilles Bisson, MPP for Timmins—James Bay (1999–2018).
- France Gélinas, MPP for Nickel Belt (2007–present).
- Elizabeth Hanson, leader of the Yukon New Democratic Party (2009–2019) & MLA for Whitehorse Centre (2010–2021).
- Andrew Swan, MLA for Minto.
- Dave Wilson, MLA for Sackville-Cobequid.
- John Vanthof, MPP for Timiskaming—Cochrane.
- Lenore Zann, MLA for Truro-Bible Hill-Millbrook-Salmon River.

=== Former provincial politicians ===
- Robin Austin (British Columbia MLA for Skeena, 2005–2017).
- Evelyn Gillespie (British Columbia MLA for Comox Valley, 1996–2001).
- Jennifer Howard (Manitoba MLA for Fort Rouge, 2007–2016).
- Eugene Kostyra (Manitoba MLA for Seven Oaks, 1981–1988).
- Ray Martin (Former Alberta NDP leader).
- Mat Whynott (Nova Scotia MLA for Hammonds Plains-Upper Sackville, 2009–2013).
- Becky Barrett (Manitoba Minister of Labour and Immigration, 1999–2003).
- Frank Corbett (Nova Scotia MLA for Cape Breton Centre, 1998–2015).

=== Municipal politicians ===
- Phil Allt (City of Guelph Councillor for Ward 3),
- James Gordon (City of Guelph Councillor for Ward 2),
- Catherine McKenney (City of Ottawa Councillor for Somerset Ward),
- Gavin Will (Deputy Mayor of Portugal Cove-St. Philip's, Newfoundland and Labrador),
- Dustin Ross Fiddler (Band Councillor, Waterhen Lake First Nation),
- Alex Felsky (Grand Erie District School Board Trustee for Brantford),
- Leigh Bursey (Brockville, Ontario, city councillor)

=== Other prominent individuals ===
- Robyn Benson (President, Public Service Alliance of Canada),
- Dave Bidini (Musician),
- Michael Byers (Academic),
- Torquil Campbell (Musician),
- Darlene Dziewit (President, Manitoba Federation of Labour, 2004–2009),
- Ken Georgetti (President, Canadian Labour Congress, 1999–2014),
- Yann Martel (Author),
- Paul Moist (President, CUPE, 2003–2015),
- Mary Shortall (President, Newfoundland and Labrador Federation of Labour),
- Pat Stogran (former leadership candidate, former veterans' ombudsman),
- David Suzuki (Environmentalist),
- Bill Tieleman (Columnist, The Tyee).
- Glen Hare, Deputy Grand Chief of the Anishinabek Nation.

=== Organisations ===
- Public Service Alliance of Canada.
- Unifor Local 103.

== Niki Ashton ==
=== Members of Parliament ===
- Sheri Benson, MP for Saskatoon West (2015–2019).
- François Choquette, MP for Drummond (2011–2019). Previously endorsed Peter Julian.
- Georgina Jolibois, MP for Desnethé—Missinippi—Churchill River (2015–2019).
- Romeo Saganash, MP for Abitibi—Baie-James—Nunavik—Eeyou (2011–2019).
- Brigitte Sansoucy, MP for Saint-Hyacinthe—Bagot (2015–2019). Previously endorsed Peter Julian.

=== Former Members of Parliament ===
- Alex Atamanenko, MP for British Columbia Southern Interior (2006–2015).
- Paulina Ayala, MP for Honoré-Mercier (2011–2015). Previously endorsed Peter Julian.
- Dennis Bevington, MP for Northwest Territories (2006–2015).
- Joe Comartin, MP for Windsor—St. Clair (2000–2004) & Windsor—Tecumseh (2004–2015).
- Raymond Côté, MP for Beauport—Limoilou (2011–2015).
- John Parry, MP for Kenora—Rainy River (1984–1988).

=== Provincial politicians ===
- Cheri DiNovo (Ontario MPP for Parkdale—High Park; withdrawn leadership candidate),
- Tom Lindsey (Manitoba MLA for Flin Flon),
- Flor Marcelino (Interim Manitoba NDP leader; Manitoba MLA for Logan),
- Doug Routley (BC MLA for Nanaimo-North Cowichan)

=== Former provincial politicians ===
- Steve Ashton (Manitoba MLA for Thompson, 1981–2016)

=== Municipal politicians ===
- Jason Blackman-Wulff (District of Squamish Councillor),
- Sue Powell (City of Parksville Councillor),
- Craig Sauvé (City of Montreal Councillor for Saint-Henri—Little-Burgundy—Pointe-Saint-Charles),
- Katherine Swampy (Samson Cree Nation Band Councillor),
- Ross Sutherland (South Frontenac, Ontario, councillor)

=== Other prominent individuals ===
- Fred Hahn (President, CUPE Ontario),
- Tarek Loubani (Activist),
- Anne Roberts (City of Vancouver Councillor, 2002–2005),
- Sid Ryan (President, Ontario Federation of Labour, 2009–2015)

=== Organisations ===
- Canadians for Justice and Peace in the Middle East
- Fightback Canada
- NDP Socialist Caucus

== Guy Caron ==
=== Members of Parliament ===
- Robert Aubin, MP for Trois-Rivières (2011–2019). Previously endorsed Peter Julian.
- Ruth Ellen Brosseau, MP for Berthier—Maskinongé (2011–2019).
- Don Davies, MP for Vancouver Kingsway (2008–present).
- Fin Donnelly, MP for New Westminster—Coquitlam (2009–2015) & Port Moody—Coquitlam (2015–2019).
- Scott Duvall, MP for Hamilton Mountain (2015–2021).
- Pierre Nantel, MP for Longueuil—Pierre-Boucher (2011–2015) & Longueuil—Saint-Hubert (2015–2019).
- Karine Trudel, MP for Jonquière (2015–2019).
- Anne Minh-Thu Quach, MP for Beauharnois—Salaberry (2011–2015) & Salaberry—Suroît (2015–2019).

=== Former Members of Parliament ===
- Chris Charlton, MP for Hamilton Mountain (2006–2015).
- Jean Crowder, MP for Nanaimo—Cowichan (2004–2015).
- Rosane Doré Lefebvre, MP for Alfred-Pellan (2011–2015).
- Yvon Godin, MP for Acadie—Bathurst (1997–2015).
- Alexa McDonough (Halifax, 1997–2008; federal NDP leader, 1995–2003; Nova Scotia NDP leader, 1980–1994).
- Lorne Nystrom (Yorkton—Melville, 1968–1993; Regina—Qu'Appelle, 1997–2004).
- Craig Scott (Toronto—Danforth, 2012–2015).
- Judy Wasylycia-Leis (Winnipeg North, 1997–2010).
- Denise Savoie (Victoria, 2006–2012).

=== Provincial politicians ===
- Peter Tabuns (Ontario MPP for Toronto—Danforth)
- Lorraine Michael (Newfoundland and Labrador MHA for St. John's East-Quidi Vidi, former provincial leader.)

=== Former provincial politicians ===
- Alex Cullen (Ontario MPP for Ottawa West, 1997–1999),
- Howard Hampton (Ontario NDP leader, 1996–2009; Ontario MPP for Rainy River, 1987–1999; Ontario MPP for Kenora—Rainy River, 1999–2011),
- Shelley Martel (Ontario MPP for Sudbury East, 1987–1999; Ontario MPP for Nickel Belt, 1999–2007),
- Theresa Oswald (Manitoba MLA for Seine River, 2003–2016),
- Erin Selby (Manitoba MLA for Southdale, 2007–2016),
- Stan Struthers (Manitoba MLA for Dauphin, 1995–1999 and 2011–2016; Manitoba MLA for Dauphin—Roblin, 1999–2011),
- Pat Atkinson (Saskatchewan MLA for Saskatoon Nutana, 1986–2011),
- Ron Lemieux (Manitoba MLA for Dawson Trail, 2011–2016 and for La Verendrye, 1999–2011)

=== Municipal politicians ===
- Alex Johnstone (Hamilton-Wentworth District School Board trustee for Wards 11 and 12)

=== Other prominent individuals ===
- Victor Lau (Green Party of Saskatchewan leader, 2011–2016),
- Lia Storey-Gamble (Co-chair, New Democratic Youth of Canada),
- Janet Solberg (Vice President, Ontario New Democratic Party, daughter of the second leader (1971–1975) of the federal NDP, David Lewis),
- Brian Topp (former President of the NDP, runner up for leader in 2012)

=== Organisations ===
- UBC NDP
- United Steelworkers

== Jagmeet Singh ==
=== Members of Parliament ===
- Rachel Blaney, MP for North Island—Powell River (2015–2025).
- Nathan Cullen, MP for Skeena—Bulkley Valley (2004–2019).
- Randall Garrison, MP for Esquimalt—Juan de Fuca (2011–2015) & Esquimalt—Saanich—Sooke (2011–2025).
- Peter Julian, MP for Burnaby—New Westminster (2004–2015) & New Westminster—Burnaby (2015–2025).
- Jenny Kwan, MP for Vancouver East (2015–present).
- Hélène Laverdière, MP for Laurier—Sainte-Marie (2011–2019).
- Alistair MacGregor, MP for Cowichan—Malahat—Langford (2015–2025).
- Sheila Malcolmson, MP for Nanaimo—Ladysmith (2015–2019).
- Brian Masse, MP for Windsor West (2002–2025).
- Tracey Ramsey, MP for Essex (2015–2019).
- Kennedy Stewart, MP for Burnaby—Douglas (2011–2015) & Burnaby South (2015–2018).

=== Former Members of Parliament ===
- Mylène Freeman, MP for Argenteuil—Papineau—Mirabel (2011–2015).

=== Provincial politicians ===
- Harry Bains (British Columbia MLA for Surrey-Newton; Minister of Labour),
- Judy Darcy (British Columbia MLA for New Westminster; Minister of Mental Health and Addictions),
- Catherine Fife (Ontario MPP for Kitchener—Waterloo),
- Rob Fleming (British Columbia MLA for Victoria-Swan Lake; Minister of Education),
- Nahanni Fontaine (Manitoba MLA for St. Johns),
- Cindy Forster (Ontario MPP for Welland),
- Jennifer French (Ontario MPP for Oshawa),
- Wayne Gates (Ontario MPP for Niagara Falls),
- Lisa Gretzky (Ontario MPP for Windsor West),
- Percy Hatfield (Ontario MPP for Windsor—Tecumseh),
- Ravi Kahlon (British Columbia MLA for Delta North),
- Anne Kang (British Columbia MLA for Burnaby-Deer Lake),
- Wab Kinew (Leader of the Manitoba NDP; MLA for Fort Rouge),
- Michael Mantha (Ontario MPP for Algoma—Manitoulin),
- Taras Natyshak (Ontario MPP for Essex),
- Lana Popham (British Columbia MLA for Saanich South; Minister of Agriculture),
- Bruce Ralston (British Columbia MLA for Surrey-Whalley; Minister of Jobs, Trade, and Technology),
- Peggy Sattler (Ontario MPP for London West),
- Rachna Singh (British Columbia MLA for Surrey-Green Timbers)

=== Former provincial politicians ===
- Rosario Marchese (Ontario MPP for Fort York, 1990–1999; Ontario MPP for Trinity—Spadina, 1999–2014),
- Jonah Schein (Ontario MPP for Davenport, 2011–2014),
- Jane Shin (British Columbia MLA for Burnaby-Lougheed, 2013–2017)

=== Municipal politicians ===
- Maria Augimeri (Toronto Councillor for Ward 9),
- Joe Cressy (Toronto Councillor for Ward 20),
- Sarah Doucette (Toronto Councillor for Ward 13),
- Paula Fletcher (Toronto Councillor for Ward 30),
- Matthew Green (City of Hamilton Councillor for Ward 3),
- Joe Mihevc (Toronto Councillor for Ward 21),
- Chris Moise (Toronto District School Board trustee for Ward 14; TDSB vice-chair),
- Gord Perks (Toronto Councillor for Ward 14),
- Anthony Perruzza (Toronto Councillor for Ward 8),
- Neethan Shan (City of Toronto Councillor for Ward 42),
- Harkirat Singh (Peel District School Board trustee for Brampton Wards 9 and 10)

=== Other prominent individuals ===
- Ali Chatur (Co-chair, New Democratic Youth of Canada),
- Tanmanjeet Dhesi (United Kingdom MP for Slough),
- Fateh (Rapper),
- Rupi Kaur (Poet),
- Brad Lavigne (former NDP National Campaign Director),
- Scott Stager Piatkowski (Vice President, Ontario NDP)

=== Organisations ===
- United Food and Commercial Workers
- International Association of Machinists and Aerospace Workers
- CUPE Local 79

=== Media ===
- Toronto Star

== Withdrawn candidates ==
=== Peter Julian ===
==== Members of Parliament ====
- Robert Aubin, MP for Trois-Rivières (2011–2019).
- Alexandre Boulerice, MP for Rosemont—La Petite-Patrie (2011–present).
- François Choquette, MP for Drummond (2011–2019).
- Pierre-Luc Dusseault, MP for Sherbrooke (2011–2019).
- Brigitte Sansoucy, MP for Saint-Hyacinthe—Bagot (2011–2019).
- Erin Weir, MP for Regina—Lewvan (2011–2019).

==== Former Members of Parliament ====
- Paulina Ayala, MP for Honoré-Mercier (2011–2015).
- Sylvain Chicoine, MP for Châteauguay—Saint-Constant (2011–2015).
- Pierre Dionne Labelle, MP for Rivière-du-Nord (2011–2015).
- Alain Giguère, MP for Marc-Aurèle-Fortin (2011–2015).
- Sadia Groguhé, MP for Saint-Lambert (2011–2015).
- Djaouida Sellah, MP for Saint-Bruno—Saint-Hubert (2011–2015).

==== Provincial politicians ====
- Raj Chouhan, MLA for Burnaby-Edmonds (2005–2024).

=== Pat Stogran ===
==== Former Members of Parliament ====
- Inky Mark, MP for Dauphin—Swan River (1997–2004) & Dauphin—Swan River—Marquette (2004–2010). (Note: Mark is not affiliated with the New Democratic Party. He most recently sat in Parliament as a Conservative and ran in the 2015 election as an independent.)
