= New Democratic Party candidates in the 2025 Canadian federal election =

This is a list of nominated candidates for the New Democratic Party in the 2025 Canadian federal election. The NDP ran candidates in 342 of the 343 ridings, 7 of whom were elected. It was the worst election result in the party's history and it lost official party status. Only 46 of the party's candidates received at least 10% of the vote, meaning the vast majority did not get campaign expenses reimbursed. Following the election, the NDP remained the fourth largest party in the House of Commons.

== Alberta ==
=== Calgary ===
Riding	Candidate's Name	Notes	Residence	Occupation	Votes	%	Rank
Calgary Centre	Beau Shaw		South Calgary	Technology professional	1,665	2.65	3rd
Calgary Confederation	Keira Gunn	NDP candidate for Calgary Forest Lawn in the 2021 federal election	Varsity, Calgary	University lecturer	2,837	4.12	3rd
Calgary Crowfoot	Jim Samuelson		Silver Springs, Calgary	Postal worker	1,741	2.56	3rd
Calgary East	Jennifer Geha		Marlborough, Calgary		2,092	3.89	3rd
Calgary Heritage	Becki Zimmerman		Killarney, Calgary	Airline employee	1,691	2.47	3rd
Calgary McKnight	Arlington Antonio Santiago	Vice-president of the University of Calgary Students' Union (2023–2024)	Falconridge, Calgary	Business consultant	1,204	2.84	3rd
Calgary Midnapore	Austin Mullins	Green Party candidate for Banff—Airdrie in the 2019 federal election	Shawnessy, Calgary	Account manager	2,326	3.17	3rd
Calgary Nose Hill	Ahmed Khan		Tuscany, Calgary	Geologist	1,975	3.21	3rd
Calgary Shepard	Tory Tomblin	ABNDP candidate for Calgary-Hays in the 2019 Alberta general election	Douglasdale, Calgary	Union official (United Nurses of Alberta)	1,780	2.73	3rd
Calgary Signal Hill	Khalis Ahmed	NDP candidate for Calgary Nose Hill in the 2021 federal election NDP candidate for Calgary Signal Hill in the 2019 and 2015 federal elections NDP candidate in the 2017 Calgary Heritage federal by-election	Signal Hill, Calgary	Geologist	1,652	2.39	3rd
Calgary Skyview	Rajesh Angral	ABNDP candidate for Calgary-North in the 2023 Alberta general election	Symons Valley, Calgary	Businessman	1,311	2.68	3rd

=== Edmonton ===
Riding	Candidate's Name	Notes	Residence	Occupation	Votes	%	Rank
Edmonton Centre	Trisha Estabrooks	Edmonton Public Schools Trustee for Ward D (2017–2025)	Highlands, Edmonton	Journalist	8,440	15.52	3rd
Edmonton Gateway	Madeline Mayes		Wîhkwêntôwin, Edmonton	Retail worker	2,565	4.96	3rd
Edmonton Griesbach	Blake Desjarlais	Member of Parliament for Edmonton Griesbach (2021–2025)	Griesbach, Edmonton	Director at Métis Settlements General Council	16,717	34.1	2nd
Edmonton Manning	Lesley Thompson		Cy Becker, Edmonton	Media producer	4,935	9.9	3rd
Edmonton Northwest	Omar Abubakar		Potter Greens, Edmonton	Non-profit executive	3,597	6.6	3rd
Edmonton Riverbend	Susan Cake	2021 candidate for president of the Alberta Federation of Labour	Bulyea Heights, Edmonton	Professor at Athabasca University	2,563	4.2	3rd
Edmonton Southeast	Harpreet Grewal		Paisley, Edmonton	Nurse	2,536	5.3	3rd
Edmonton Strathcona	Heather McPherson	Member of Parliament for Edmonton Strathcona (2019–present)	Argyll, Edmonton	NGO executive director	28,027	47.0	1st
Edmonton West	Sean McQuillan		Edmonton	Union official (BCFED)	3,164	5.4	3rd

=== Rural Alberta ===
Riding	Candidate's Name	Notes	Residence	Occupation	Votes	%	Rank
Airdrie—Cochrane	Sarah Zagoda	NDP candidate for Banff—Airdrie in the 2021 federal election	Airdrie	IT professional	2,591	3.7	3rd
Battle River—Crowfoot	James MacKay			Labourer	2,061	3.2	3rd
Bow River	Luisa Gwin		Chestermere	Construction estimator	1,689	3.0	3rd
Foothills	Kattie Aurora			Rocket scientist	1,923	2.7	3rd
Fort McMurray—Cold Lake	You-Ju Choi		Sherbrooke, Edmonton		1,337	2.7	3rd
Grande Prairie	Jennifer Villebrun	NDP candidate for Grande Prairie—Mackenzie in the 2021 federal election NDP candidate for Peace River—Westlock in the 2019 federal election NDP Peace River in the 2011 federal election Green Party candidate for Peace River in the 2008 federal election	Valleyview	Teacher/lawyer	2,460	4.2	3rd
Lakeland	Des Bissonnette	NDP candidate for Lakeland in the 2021 federal election	Lloydminster	Social support worker	2,153	3.8	3rd
Leduc—Wetaskiwin	Katherine Swampy	Member of Samson Cree Nation Band Council (2017–2023); ABNDP candidate for Maskwacis-Wetaskiwin in the 2023 Alberta provincial election NDP candidate for Edmonton Centre in the 2019 federal election NDP candidate for Battle River—Crowfoot in the 2015 federal election		Business development manager	3,927	6.1	3rd
Lethbridge	Nathan Svoboda		Lethbridge	Paramedic	2,431	3.6	3rd
Medicine Hat—Cardston—Warner	Jocelyn Johnson		Ritchie, Edmonton	Union official (CUPE)	2,588	4.8	3rd
Parkland	Keri Goad		Jasper Park, Edmonton	Teacher	2,949	4.1	3rd
Peace River—Westlock	Landen Tischer	ABNDP candidate for Athabasca-Barrhead-Westlock in the 2023 Alberta provincial election	Barrhead	Driller	2,913	5.5	4th
Sherwood Park—Fort Saskatchewan	Chris Jones		Sherwood Park	Pipefitter	4,136	5.1	3rd
Ponoka—Didsbury	Logan Hooley		Bluffton	University student	7,414	10.8	2nd
Red Deer	Elias Assefa		Terrace Heights, Edmonton	Software developer	2,375	3.8	3rd
St. Albert—Sturgeon River	Dot Anderson		St. Albert	Social worker	3,684	4.8	3rd
Yellowhead	Avni Soma		Canmore	Small business owner	2,753	4.0	3rd

== British Columbia ==
=== British Columbia Interior ===
Riding	Candidate's Name	Notes	Residence	Occupation	Votes	%	Rank
Cariboo—Prince George	Angie Bonazzo		Prince George	Nurse	3,900	6.2	3rd
Chilliwack—Hope	Teri Westerby	Chilliwack School District No. 33 Trustee (2022–present)	Chilliwack	Small business owner/farmer	4,779	7.3	3rd
Kamloops—Shuswap—Central Rockies	Phaedra Idzan		Shuswap Country	Auto industry professional	3,730	5.5	3rd
Kamloops—Thompson—Nicola	Miguel Godau		Castlegar	Civil servant	3,681	5.9	3rd
Kelowna	Trevor McAleese		Westbank	Video game developer	1,941	3.3	3rd
Columbia—Kootenay—Southern Rockies	Kallee Lins		Nelson	Non-profit director	12,871	18.0	3rd
Okanagan Lake West—South Kelowna	Harpreet Badohal	BC NDP candidate for Kelowna-Mission in the 2024 British Columbia provincial election	Kelowna	Work safety professional	2,189	3.4	3rd
Prince George—Peace River—Northern Rockies	Cory Longley	NDP candidate for Prince George—Peace River—Northern Rockies in the 2021 federal election BC NDP candidate for Peace River South in the 2020 British Columbia provincial election	Dawson Creek	Plumber	3,542	6.0	3rd
Similkameen—South Okanagan—West Kootenay	Linda Sankey		Penticton	Supportive housing director	11,033	16.2	3rd
Skeena—Bulkley Valley	Taylor Bachrach	Member of Parliament for Skeena—Bulkley Valley (2019–2025); Mayor of Smithers (2011–2019)	Smithers	Small business owner	17,677	39.3	2nd
Vernon—Lake Country—Monashee	Leah Main	Member of Silverton Village Council (2010–present)	Silverton	Director of the Federation of Canadian Municipalities	3,417	5.1	3rd

=== Fraser Valley/Lower Mainland ===
Riding	Candidate's Name	Notes	Residence	Occupation	Votes	%	Rank
Abbotsford—South Langley	Dharmasena Yakandawela	NDP candidate for Abbotsford in the 2021 federal election		Lawyer	2,104	3.8	4th
Burnaby North—Seymour	Michael Charrois			Actor	4,121	6.4	3rd
Cloverdale—Langley City	Vanessa Sharma	NDP candidate for the 2024 Cloverdale—Langley City federal by-election		Union official (CLC)	2,350	4.4	3rd
Coquitlam—Port Coquitlam	Laura Dupont	NDP candidate for Coquitlam—Port Coquitlam in the 2021 federal election Member of Port Coquitlam City Council (2014–2022)	Port Coquitlam		4,253	7.4	3rd
Delta	Jason McCormick	BC NDP candidate for Delta South in the 2024 British Columbia provincial election	Ladner, Delta	Bus driver	2,787	4.4	3rd
Fleetwood—Port Kells	Shannon Permal		Surrey	Civil servant	2,885	5.9	3rd
Langley Township—Fraser Heights	Holly Isaac		Walnut Grove, Langley	Union leader (CUPW)	2,611	4.0	3rd
Mission—Matsqui—Abbotsford	Jules Côté		Abbotsford	University student	2,745	4.6	3rd
New Westminster—Burnaby—Maillardville	Peter Julian	Member of Parliament for New Westminster—Burnaby (2004–2025)	New Westminster		17,574	31.5	2nd
North Vancouver—Capilano	Tammy Bentz	NDP candidate for North Vancouver in the 2021 federal election	Upper Lonsdale, North Vancouver	Filmmaker/actor	2,684	4.2	3rd
Pitt Meadows—Maple Ridge	Daniel Heydenrych			Security analyst/reserve army officer	4,141	6.2	3rd
Port Moody—Coquitlam	Bonita Zarrillo	Member of Parliament for Port Moody—Coquitlam (2021–2025); Member of Coquitlam City Council (2013–2021)	Coquitlam	Computer programmer/data analyst	9,360	15.0	3rd
Richmond Centre—Marpole	Martin Li		Richmond	Human resources professional	2,109	4.4	3rd
Richmond East—Steveston	Keefer Pelech		Richmond	Civil servant	2,251	4.2	3rd
South Surrey—White Rock	Jureun Park			Hotel manager	1,634	2.5	3rd
Surrey Centre	Dominic Denofrio	Independent candidate for Vancouver City Council in the 2022 municipal election	Vancouver	Executive assistant	2,811	6.8	3rd
Surrey—Newton	Raj Toor Singh		White Rock		2,467	6.0	3rd
Vancouver Centre	Avi Lewis	NDP candidate for West Vancouver—Sunshine Coast—Sea to Sky Country in the 2021 federal election		Documentary filmmaker/broadcaster	6,807	12.6	3rd
Vancouver East	Jenny Kwan	Member of Parliament for Vancouver East (2015–present); Member of the British Columbia Legislative Assembly for Vancouver-Mount Pleasant (1996–2015); Member of Vancouver City Council (1993–1996)	Vancouver	Legal aid worker	24,945	43.6	1st
Vancouver Fraserview—South Burnaby	Manoj Bhangu		Sunset, Vancouver	Small business owner	5,088	9.8	3rd
Vancouver Granville	Sukhi Sahota		Hastings–Sunrise, Vancouver	NGO employee	4,489	7.5	3rd
Vancouver Kingsway	Don Davies	Member of Parliament for Vancouver Kingsway (2008–present)	Kensington–Cedar Cottage, Vancouver	Lawyer	18,788	37.2	1st
Vancouver Quadra	Alim Fakirani		Vancouver	Educator	2,391	4.3	3rd
West Vancouver—Sunshine Coast—Sea to Sky Country	Jäger Rosenberg		Gibsons		2,077	3.2	4th

=== Vancouver Island ===
Riding	Candidate's Name	Notes	Residence	Occupation	Votes	%	Rank
Courtenay—Alberni	Gord Johns	Member of Parliament for Courtenay—Alberni (2015–present)	Port Alberni	Small business owner	31,617	39.6	1st
Cowichan—Malahat—Langford	Alistair MacGregor	Member of Parliament for Cowichan—Malahat—Langford (2015–2025)	Duncan	Executive assistant	24,826	32.6	2nd
Esquimalt—Saanich—Sooke	Maja Tait	Mayor of Sooke (2014–present); Member of Sooke District Council (2008–2014)	Sooke	Property manager	13,666	18.6	3rd
Nanaimo—Ladysmith	Lisa Marie Barron	Member of Parliament for Nanaimo—Ladysmith (2021–present); Nanaimo Ladysmith Public Schools District Trustee (2018–2021)		Social worker	13,586	18.3	3rd
North Island—Powell River	Tanille Johnston	Member of Campbell River City Council (2022–present)	Campbell River	Social worker	26,357	32.6	2nd
Saanich—Gulf Islands	Colin Plant	Member of Saanich District Council (2014–present)	Saanich	Teacher	3,163	4.0	4th
Victoria	Laurel Collins	Member of Parliament for Victoria (2019–2025); Member of Victoria City Council (2018–2019)	James Bay, Victoria	Professor at the University of Victoria	18,877	24.9	2nd

== Manitoba ==
=== Rural Manitoba ===
Riding	Candidate's Name	Notes	Residence	Occupation	Votes	%	Rank
Brandon—Souris	Quentin Robinson	Manitoba NDP candidate for Brandon West in the 2023 Manitoba provincial election	Brandon	Christian minister	6,637	14.42	3rd
Churchill—Keewatinook Aski	Niki Ashton	Member of Parliament for Churchill—Keewatinook Aski (2008–2025)	Thompson	Researcher/instructor at the University College of the North	5,880	28.7	2nd
Portage—Lisgar	Lisa Tessier-Burch		Portage la Prairie	Teacher	2,011	4.4	3rd
Provencher	Brandy Schmidt	Manitoba NDP candidate in the 2012 Fort Whyte provincial by-election	Westboro	Executive assistant	2,398	4.6	3rd
Riding Mountain	Andrew Douglas Maxwell		Swan River	Dentist	3,072	7.3	3rd
Selkirk—Interlake—Eastman	Josef Estabrooks		Crescentwood	Bookseller	3,535	6.5	3rd

=== Winnipeg ===
Riding	Candidate's Name	Notes	Residence	Occupation	Votes	%	Rank
Elmwood—Transcona	Leila Dance	Member of Parliament for Elmwood—Transcona (2024–2025)	Canterbury Park, Winnipeg	Charitable organization executive	16,138	34.5	2nd
Kildonan—St. Paul	Emily Clark	NDP candidate for Kildonan—St. Paul in the 2021 federal election	Winnipeg	Sales manager	3,863	7.0	3rd
St. Boniface—St. Vital	Thomas Linner		Windsor Park, Winnipeg	Communications professional	3,773	6.9	3rd
Winnipeg Centre	Leah Gazan	Member of Parliament for Winnipeg Centre (2019–present)	Wolseley, Winnipeg	Lecturer at the University of Winnipeg	13,524	39.4	1st
Winnipeg North	Adebayo Akinrogunde		Winnipeg	Mental health and childcare worker	2,059	6.0	3rd
Winnipeg South	Joanne Bjornson		River Park South, Winnipeg	Sales manager	2,114	4.6	3rd
Winnipeg South Centre	Jorge Requena Ramos		Winnipeg	Artist	3,463	6.5	3rd
Winnipeg West	Avery Selby-Lyons	Daughter of Erin Selby	Island Lakes, Winnipeg	University student/retail worker	2,218	4.0	3rd

== New Brunswick ==
Riding	Candidate's Name	Notes	Residence	Occupation	Votes	%	Rank
Acadie—Bathurst	Ty Boulay	NBNDP candidate for Belle-Baie-Belledune in the 2024 New Brunswick general election	Dalhousie		2,108	4.4	3rd
Beauséjour	Alex Gagne	NBNDP candidate for Moncton East in the 2024	Harrisville		1,448	2.4	3rd
Fredericton—Oromocto	Nicki Lyons-MacFarlane	NBNDP candidate for Fredericton South-Silverwood in the 2024 New Brunswick general election	Fredericton	Librarian	908	1.8	4th
Fundy Royal	Cindy Andrie		Quispamsis		1,507	3.2	3rd
Madawaska—Restigouche	Daisy Petersen	President of CUPE Local 1159; NBNDP candidate for Restigouche East in the 2024 New Brunswick provincial election	Dalhousie	Nurse	1,251	3.0	3rd
Miramichi—Grand Lake	Josh Floyd	NBNDP candidate for Saint John East in the 2024 and 2020 New Brunswick provincial elections NDP candidate for Fundy Royal in the 2021 federal election	Saint John	Travel agent	968	2.5	3rd
Moncton—Dieppe	Serge Landry	NDP candidate for Moncton—Riverview—Dieppe in the 2021 federal election	Moncton	Union official (CLC)	1,775	3.7	3rd
Saint John—St. Croix	Andrew Hill		Charters Settlement		1,206	2.7	3rd
Saint John—Kennebecasis	Armand Cormier	NBNDP for Fredericton West-Hanwell in the 2020 New Brunswick provincial election NDP candidate for Saint John—Rothesay in the 2019 federal election	Fredericton		1,643	3.3	3rd
Tobique—Mactaquac	Michael Winter		Hampton	Student (UNB)	812	2.0	3rd

== Newfoundland and Labrador ==
Riding	Candidate's Name	Notes	Residence	Occupation	Votes	%	Rank
Avalon	Judy Vanta	NL NDP candidate for Burgeo-La Poile in the 2021 Newfoundland and Labrador provincial election			2,284	4.9	3rd
Cape Spear	Brenda Walsh	NL NDP candidate for St. John's West in the 2021 Newfoundland and Labrador provincial election	Kilbride, St. John's	Civil servant	2,446	5.3	3rd
Central Newfoundland	Darian Vincent		Bay Roberts	Retail worker	965	2.4	3rd
Labrador	Marius Normore			Work safety professional	764	6.8	3rd
Long Range Mountains	Sarah Parsons		Corner Brook	Youth care worker	2,011	4.4	3rd
St. John's East	Mary Shortall	President of the New Democratic Party (2023–present); President of the Newfoundland and Labrador Federation of Labour (2013–2022); NDP candidate for St. John's East in the 2021 federal election NDP candidate for Gander—Grand Falls in the 1997 federal election	St. John's	Union leader (NLFL)	5,172	11.2	3rd
Terra Nova—The Peninsulas (judicially certified)	Liam Ryan		Dunville	University student	1,677	4.1	3rd

== Nova Scotia ==
Riding	Candidate's Name	Notes	Residence	Occupation	Votes	%	Rank
Acadie—Annapolis	Ingrid Deon		Middle West Pubnico	Small business owner	1,768	3.7	3rd
Cape Breton—Canso—Antigonish	Joanna Clark		Port Hood	Small business owner	1,930	4.0	3rd
Central Nova	Jesiah MacDonald		New Glasgow	Custodian	1,649	3.3	3rd
Cumberland—Colchester	Larry Duchesne	Leader of the New Democratic Party of Prince Edward Island (1991–1995)	Oxford	Teacher	1,873	3.8	3rd
Dartmouth—Cole Harbour	Keith Morrison	Candidate for District 3 in the 2024 Halifax municipal election	Eastern Passage	Teacher	4,201	7.0	3rd
Halifax	Lisa Roberts	Member of the Nova Scotia House of Assembly for Halifax Needham (2016–2021)	Convoy Place, Halifax	Journalist	8,642	16.6	3rd
Halifax West	Rae Tench		Clayton Park, Halifax	Bank manager/financial planner	3,083	5.6	3rd
Kings—Hants	Paul Doerr	NSNDP candidate for Kings West in the 2024 Nova Scotia provincial election	Wolfville	Financial advisor	2,154	3.6	3rd
Sackville—Bedford—Preston	Isaac Wilson	NSNDP candidate for Bedford South in the 2024 Nova Scotia provincial election		Pharmacist	2,324	4.0	3rd
South Shore—St. Margarets	~~Brendan Mosher~~ None (NDP endorsing independent candidate Hayden Henderson)	~~NSNDP candidate for Chester-St. Margaret's in the 2024 Nova Scotia provincial election~~ Withdrew on April 9, 2025	~~Chester~~	~~Firefighter~~	– (500)	– (0.99)	– (5th)
Sydney—Glace Bay	Kimberly Losier		Glace Bay	Credit union worker	1,789	3.8	3rd

== Ontario ==
=== Central Ontario ===
Riding	Candidate's Name	Notes	Residence	Occupation	Votes	%	Rank
Barrie South—Innisfil	Andrew Harrigan	President of OPSEU Local 304; ONDP candidate for Barrie—Innisfil in the 2025 Ontario provincial election Candidate for Ward 3 in the 2022 Innisfil municipal election	Innisfil	Child protection investigator/Union leader (OPSEU)	2,130	3.2	3rd
Barrie—Springwater—Oro-Medonte	Gabriela Trujillo				1,559	2.4	3rd
Haliburton—Kawartha Lakes	Aylea Teel		Kawartha Lakes		2,625	3.5	3rd
New Tecumseth—Gwillimbury	Nancy Morrison	ONDP candidate for York—Simcoe in the 2007 Ontario provincial election			1,226	1.9	3rd
Northumberland—Clarke	Ava Becker		Cobourg	University student	2,090	2.9	3rd
Peterborough	Heather Ray		Douro-Dummer	Farmer	2,406	3.0	3rd
Simcoe—Grey	Jasleen Bains			Social media manager	1,574	2.3	3rd
Simcoe North	Melissa Lloyd		Peterborough		2,508	3.8	3rd

=== Eastern Ontario/Ottawa ===
Riding	Candidate's Name	Notes	Residence	Occupation	Votes	%	Rank
Algonquin—Renfrew—Pembroke	Eileen Jones-Whyte	NDP candidate for Renfrew—Nipissing—Pembroke in the 2019 federal election	Eganville	Teacher	2,469	3.7	3rd
Bay of Quinte	Kate Crothers		Picton	Small business owner	2,373	3.6	3rd
Carleton	Beth Prokaska		Woodpark, Ottawa	Teacher	1,221	1.4	3rd
Hastings—Lennox and Addington—Tyendinaga	Ava Duffy		Marmora		2,351	3.5	3rd
Kanata	Melissa Simon		Kanata, Ottawa	Social worker	1,702	2.3	3rd
Kingston and the Islands	Daria Juüdi-Hope		Kingston	Nurse	3,648	4.7	3rd
Lanark—Frontenac	Danielle Rae		Pakenham	Legal assistant	1,986	2.9	3rd
Leeds—Grenville—Thousand Islands and Rideau Lakes	Paul Lancione		Brockville	Finance professional	2,341	3.5	3rd
Nepean	Shyam Shukla		Blossom Park, Ottawa	Civil servant/IT professional	1,424	2.0	3rd
Orléans	Oulai Bertrand Goué	NDP candidate for Montcalm in the 2021 federal election	Old Ottawa East	Teacher	2,063	2.6	3rd
Ottawa Centre	Joel Harden	Member of the Legislative Assembly of Ontario for Ottawa Centre (2018–2025)	Old Ottawa South	Researcher/educator	15,935	19.6	2nd
Ottawa South	Hena Masjedee		Blossom Park, Ottawa	Policy analyst	4,017	6.0	3rd
Ottawa—Vanier—Gloucester	Tristan Oliff		Forbes, Ottawa	Communications professional	5,164	7.6	3rd
Ottawa West—Nepean	Josh Bizjak		Champlain Park, Ottawa	Executive Director of the Douglas Coldwell Layton Foundation	4,847	7.1	3rd
Prescott—Russell—Cumberland	Ryder Finlay	ONDP candidate for Glengarry—Prescott—Russell in the 2025 Ontario provincial election	Orleans	University student	1,730	2.4	3rd
Stormont—Dundas—South Glengarry	Mario Leclerc		Cornwall	Paralegal	1,653	2.5	3rd

=== Greater Toronto Area ===
Riding	Candidate's Name	Notes	Residence	Occupation	Votes	%	Rank
Ajax	Kyle Forster		Oshawa		1,762	2.68	3rd
Aurora—Oak Ridges—Richmond Hill	Danielle Maniuk		Sarnia	Financial professional	835	1.34	4th
Beaches—East York	Shannon Devine		Leslieville, Toronto	Union official (United Steelworkers)	4,027	6.85	3rd
Brampton Centre	Anil Boodhai			Teacher	1,085	2.66	3rd
Brampton—Chinguacousy Park	Teresa Yeh	NDP candidate for Brampton North in the 2021 federal election	Brampton	Teacher	1,169	2.66	3rd
Brampton East	Haramrit Singh				821	1.69	4th
Brampton North—Caledon	Ruby Zaman	ONDP candidate for Brampton North in the 2025 Ontario provincial election	Brampton	Truck driver	1,001	2.16	3rd
Brampton South	Rajni Sharma	ONDP candidate for Brampton South in the 2025 Ontario provincial election	Ebenezer, Brampton	Social services worker	777	1.74	3rd
Brampton West	Zaigham Javed		Milton	Small business owner	708	1.67	3rd
Bowmanville—Oshawa North	Elenor Marano		Oshawa		2,032	2.87	3rd
Burlington	Michael Beauchemin		Burlington	Technology professional	1,549	1.98	3rd
Burlington North—Milton West	Naveed Abdul Ahmed	Halton District School Board Trustee for Wards 3 & 4 (2022–present)	Milton	Small business owner	1,507	2.14	3rd
Davenport	Sandra Sousa		Davenport, Toronto	Data engineer	10,452	17.1	3rd
Don Valley North	Naila Saeed	ONDP candidate for Aurora—Oak Ridges—Richmond Hill in the 2025 Ontario provincial election		Childcare executive	1,191	2.45	3rd
Don Valley West	Linnea Löfström-Abary	ONDP candidate for Don Valley West in the 2025 Ontario provincial election	Sherwood Park, Toronto	Union organizer (CUPE)	1,382	2.36	3rd
Eglinton—Lawrence	Allison Tanzola		Toronto	University student	1,077	1.77	3rd
Etobicoke Centre	Ji Won Jung				1,610	2.37	3rd
Etobicoke—Lakeshore	Cory Wagar		New Toronto	Public relations professional	1,657	2.54	3rd
Etobicoke North	Benjamin Abis		The Elms, Toronto	Retired Correctional Officer	1,354	2.30	3rd
Humber River—Black Creek	Matias de Dovitiis	Toronto District School Board Trustee for Ward 4 (Humber River–Black Creek) (2022–present); NDP candidate for Humber River—Black Creek in the 2021 federal election	Jane and Finch, Toronto	Professor at George Brown College	2,445	6.38	3rd
King—Vaughan	Samantha Sanchez	ONDP candidate for King—Vaughan in the 2022 Ontario provincial election		Lawyer	757	1.13	3rd
Markham—Stouffville	Serena Cheung				1,121	1.82	3rd
Markham—Thornhill	Aftab Qureshi	NDP candidate for Markham—Unionville in the 2021 federal election	Markham	Small business owner	1,022	2.03	3rd
Markham—Unionville	Sameer Qureshi	ONDP candidate for Markham—Unionville in the 2025 Ontario provincial election	Markham	University student	723	1.35	3rd
Milton East—Halton Hills South	Muhammad Riaz Sahi	NDP candidate for Milton in the 2021 federal election	Milton	Lawyer	1,029	1.54	3rd
Mississauga Centre	Brandon Nguyen		Mississauga	Court reporter	1,504	2.74	3rd
Mississauga East—Cooksville	Khawar Hussain	Candidate for Ward 3 in the 2018 Mississauga municipal election	Mississauga	Public health inspector	1,508	2.79	3rd
Mississauga—Erin Mills	Ehab Mustapha		Port Credit, Mississauga	Fintech professional	1,312	2.19	3rd
Mississauga—Lakeshore	Evelyn Butler		Mississauga	Social media manager	1,254	1.88	3rd
Mississauga—Malton	Inderjeetsingh Ailsinghani		Meadowvale, Mississauga	Business analyst	1,362	2.71	3rd
Mississauga—Streetsville	Bushra Asghar		Mississauga	NGO professional	1,388	2.29	3rd
Newmarket—Aurora	Anna Gollen				1,473	2.36	3rd
Oakville East	Hailey Ford		Oakville	University student / Journalist	1,702	2.79	3rd
Oakville West	Diane Downey	ONDP candidate for Oakville in the 2025 Ontario provincial election	Oakville	Video game developer	823	1.39	3rd
Oshawa	Sara Labelle		Oshawa	Laboratory technician	5,112	7.66	3rd
Pickering—Brooklin	Jamie Nye	ONDP candidate for Whitby in the 2025 Ontario provincial election	Pickering	Electrician	1,838	2.58	3rd
Richmond Hill South	Ebrahim Astaraki	ONDP candidate for Don Valley North in the 2025 and 2022 provincial elections	Bayview Woods-Steeles, Toronto	Educator	1,053	1.80	3rd
Scarborough—Agincourt	Dan Lovell		L'Amoreaux, Toronto	Teacher	1,449	2.88	3rd
Scarborough Centre—Don Valley East	Alyson Koa		Chapel Hill	Tour guide	1,583	3.29	3rd
Scarborough—Guildwood—Rouge Park	Kingsley Kwok	ONDP candidate for Markham—Stouffville in the 2022 and 2018 provincial elections	Malvern, Toronto	Respiratory therapist	1,770	3.20	3rd
Scarborough North	Karishma Manji		Toronto	Physician	1,844	3.95	3rd
Scarborough Southwest	Fatima Shaban		Clairlea, Toronto	Non-profit fundraising professional	2,710	4.98	3rd
Scarborough—Woburn	George Wedge		West Rouge, Toronto	Aerospace industry professional	1,890	4.53	4th
Spadina—Harbourfront	Norm Di Pasquale	Candidate for Ward 11 University—Rosedale in the 2022 Toronto municipal election NDP candidate for Spadina—Fort York in the 2021 federal election Toronto Catholic District School Board Trustee for Ward 9 (2018–2022)	Toronto	IT professional	3,995	7.75	3rd
Taiaiako'n—Parkdale—High Park	Bhutila Karpoche	Member of the Legislative Assembly of Ontario for Parkdale—High Park (2018–2025)	Toronto	Epidemiologist	15,003	22.97	2nd
Thornhill	William McCarty			IT professional	833	1.24	3rd
Toronto Centre	Samantha Green		Cabbagetown, Toronto	Physician/Professor at the University of Toronto	7,357	12.52	3rd
Toronto—Danforth	Clare Hacksel	NDP candidate for Toronto—Danforth in the 2021 federal election	Riverdale, Toronto	Lecturer at Toronto Metropolitan University	7,554	12.96	3rd
Toronto—St. Paul's	Bruce Levy	Former Canadian High Commissioner to Sri Lanka and the Maldives	Toronto	Diplomat/small business owner	2,506	3.50	3rd
University—Rosedale	Serena Purdy		Kensington Market, Toronto	Epidemiologist	6,142	9.91	3rd
Vaughan—Woodbridge	Ali Bahman			Policy analyst	895	1.33	3rd
Whitby	Kevin Goswell		Whitby	Correctional officer	1,672	2.44	3rd
Willowdale	Christy Kheirallah		Lansing, Toronto	Public relations professional	1,286	2.70	3rd
York Centre	Sinan Ulukanligil		Scarborough, Toronto	Translator	1,189	2.50	3rd
York—Durham	Justin Graham	ONDP candidate for York—Simcoe in the 2025 Ontario provincial election	Georgina	Property assessor	1,821	2.54	3rd
York South—Weston—Etobicoke	Louise James		Rockcliffe–Smythe, Toronto	Lawyer	2,325	5.23	3rd

=== Hamilton/Niagara ===
Riding	Candidate's Name	Notes	Residence	Occupation	Votes	%	Rank
Flamborough—Glanbrook—Brant North	Peter Werhun		Old Town, Toronto	Lawyer	1,630	2.44	3rd
Hamilton Centre	Matthew Green	Member of Parliament for Hamilton Centre (2019–present); Member of Hamilton City Council (2014–2018)	Hamilton	Non-profit director	16,577	29.08	3rd
Hamilton East—Stoney Creek	Nayla Mithani			Project manager	2,451	3.63	3rd
Hamilton Mountain	Monique Taylor	Member of the Legislative Assembly of Ontario for Hamilton Mountain (2011–2025)	Hamilton	Executive assistant	7,156	11.94	3rd
Hamilton West—Ancaster—Dundas	Roberto Henriquez	NDP candidate for Hamilton West—Ancaster—Dundas in the 2021 federal election	Hamilton	Lawyer	3,648	5.24	3rd
Niagara Falls—Niagara-on-the-Lake	Shannon Mitchell		Niagara Falls	Executive assistant	2,335	3.85	3rd
Niagara South	Chantal McCollum		Welland	Lawyer	4,307	5.61	3rd
Niagara West	Justin Abando		Merritton, St. Catharines		2,261	3.21	3rd
St. Catharines	Karen Orlandi		St. Catharines	United Church minister	4,021	6.02	3rd

=== Northern Ontario ===
Riding	Candidate's Name	Notes	Residence	Occupation	Votes	%	Rank
Kapuskasing—Timmins—Mushkegowuk	Nicole Fortier Levesque	Mayor of Moonbeam (2018–2024)	Moonbeam	Teacher	4,854	10.29	3rd
Kenora—Kiiwetinoong	Tania Cameron	NDP candidate for Kenora in the 2011 and 2008 federal elections	Kenora	Senior care home executive	3,684	13.72	3rd
Nipissing—Timiskaming	Valerie Kennedy		Englehart	Librarian	3,506	6.09	3rd
Parry Sound—Muskoka	Heather Hay	NDP candidate for Parry Sound—Muskoka in the 2021 federal election	Gravenhurst	Seniors' care professional	2,300	3.56	3rd
Sault Ste. Marie—Algoma	Laura Mayer	Member of Mississauga First Nation Tribal Council (2020–present)	Blind River	Non-profit director/lawyer	4,215	6.59	3rd
Sudbury	Nadia Verrelli	NDP candidate for Sudbury in the 2021 federal election	Sudbury	Professor at Laurentian University	4,650	7.69	3rd
Sudbury East—Manitoulin—Nickel Belt	Andréane Chénier	Conseil scolaire de district du Grand Nord de l'Ontario Trustee for Area 10 (2022–present); NDP candidate for Nickel Belt in the 2021 federal election	Hanmer	Union official (CUPE)	4,818	7.99	3rd
Thunder Bay—Rainy River	Yuk-Sem Won	Candidate for Neebing in the 2022 Thunder Bay municipal election NDP candidate for Thunder Bay—Rainy River in the 2021 and 2019 federal election	Thunder Bay	Instructor at Confederation College/Artist	2,954	6.8	3rd
Thunder Bay—Superior North	Joy Wakefield		Thunder Bay	Lawyer	3,239	7.12	3rd

=== Southwestern Ontario ===
Riding	Candidate's Name	Notes	Residence	Occupation	Votes	%	Rank
Brantford—Brant South—Six Nations	Anne Gajerski-Cauley	NDP candidate for Wellington—Halton Hills in the 2015 federal election	Paris	United Church minister	2,410	3.66	3rd
Bruce—Grey—Owen Sound	Christopher Neudorf	NDP candidate for Bruce—Grey—Owen Sound in the 2021 federal election	Owen Sound	Teacher	2,212	3.27	3rd
Cambridge	José De Lima		Cambridge	Social worker	2,174	3.33	3rd
Chatham-Kent—Leamington	Seamus Fleming		Crystal Beach	University student	2,944	4.07	3rd
Dufferin—Caledon	Viktor Karklins		Orangeville	Professor at Conestoga College/Business consultant	1,815	2.55	3rd
Elgin—St. Thomas—London South	Paul Pighin	ONDP candidate for London West in the 2007 Ontario provincial election	London	Executive assistant	3,118	4.81	3rd
Essex	Lori Wightman		Amherstburg	Librarian	4,081	5.09	3rd
Guelph	Janice Folk-Dawson	Vice-president of the Ontario Federation of Labour (2019–2023)	Guelph	Union leader (OFL)	2,129	3.20	4th
Haldimand—Norfolk	Shannon Horner-Shepherd		Port Dover	Steelworker	2,412	3.37	3rd
Huron—Bruce	Melanie Burrett		Egmondville	Librarian	2,341	3.36	3rd
Kitchener Centre	Heather Zaleski			Executive assistant	1,157	1.96	4th
Kitchener—Conestoga	Maya Bozorgzad		Wilmot	Lawyer	1,821	2.93	3rd
Kitchener South—Hespeler	Lorne Bruce	NDP candidate for Cambridge in the 2021 federal election and Kitchener South—Hespeler in the 2015 federal election	Kitchener	Retail manager	1,814	3.00	3rd
London—Fanshawe	Lindsay Mathyssen	Member of Parliament for London—Fanshawe (2019–2025)	London		16,112	27.55	3rd
London West	Shinade Allder	President of Unifor Local 6005	London	Union leader (Unifor)	3,370	5.44	3rd
Middlesex—London	Taylor McIntosh		London	Child protection worker	2,983	4.27	3rd
Oxford	Matthew Chambers	NDP candidate for Oxford in the 2021 and 2019 federal election	Ingersoll	Custodian	3,134	4.37	3rd
Perth—Wellington	Kevin Kruchkywich	Candidate for Stratford City Council in the 2022 municipal election NDP candidate for Perth—Wellington in the 2021 federal election	Stratford	Actor	2,909	4.54	3rd
Sarnia—Lambton—Bkejwanong	Lo-Anne Chan		Sarnia	Small business owner	4,079	5.34	3rd
Waterloo	Héline Chow		Waterloo	Civil servant	2,620	4.15	3rd
Wellington—Halton Hills North	Andrew Bascombe	NDP candidate for Wellington—Halton Hills in the 2019 federal election	Acton	Small business owner/construction worker	1,353	2.01	4th
Windsor—Tecumseh—Lakeshore	Alex Illijoski		Tecumseh	Ambulance communications officer	4,240	6.05	3rd
Windsor West	Brian Masse	Member of Parliament for Windsor West (2002–2025); Member of Windsor City Council (1997–2002)	Windsor	Employment specialist	15,256	27.79	3rd

== Prince Edward Island ==
Riding	Candidate's Name	Notes	Residence	Occupation	Votes	%	Rank
Cardigan	Lynne Thiele	NDP candidate for Cardigan in the 2021 and 2019 federal election	Stratford	Teacher	505	2.00	3rd
Charlottetown	Joe Byrne	Leader of the New Democratic Party of Prince Edward Island (2018–2020)	Charlottetown		906	4.30	3rd
Egmont	Carol Rybinski	PEI NDP candidate for Tyne Valley-Sherbrooke in the 2023 PEI provincial election	Tyne Valley	Small business owner	585	2.44	3rd
Malpeque	Cassie MacKay		Summerside	Small business owner/teacher	371	1.38	4th

== Quebec ==
=== Central Quebec ===
Riding	Candidate's Name	Notes	Residence	Occupation	Votes	%	Rank
Bécancour—Nicolet—Saurel—Alnôbak	Tommy Gagnon		Bécancour	Car dealer	1,112	2.05	4th
Berthier—Maskinongé	Ruth Ellen Brosseau	Member of Parliament for Berthier—Maskinongé (2011–2019)	Yamachiche		13,457	21.72	3rd
Joliette—Manawan	Vanessa Gordon		Pointe-Saint-Charles		1,408	2.46	4th
Montcalm	Denis Perreault		Mascouche	Bus driver	1,893	3.23	4th
Portneuf—Jacques-Cartier	Félix Couture		Angus		1,034	1.59	4th
Repentigny	Nathalie Gagnon		Louiseville	Restaurant worker	1,722	2.73	4th
Rivière-du-Nord	Christel Marchand		Montreal	Communications advisor	2,032	3.50	4th
Saint-Maurice—Champlain	Nathalie Garceau		Montreal		1,224	1.97	4th
Trois-Rivières	Matthew Sévigny	ONDP candidate for Orléans in the 2025 Ontario provincial election	Ottawa	University student	1,437	2.34	4th

=== Eastern Townships/Southern Quebec ===
Riding	Candidate's Name	Notes	Residence	Occupation	Votes	%	Rank
Beauce	Annabelle Lafond-Poirier		Lennoxville	Physician	1,100	1.75	5th
Beauharnois—Salaberry—Soulanges—Huntingdon	Tyler Jones		Salaberry-de-Valleyfield	Courier	1,663	2.4	4th
Brome—Missisquoi	Zoé Larose		Shaughnessy Village	Retail manager	1,600	2.22	4th
Châteauguay—Les Jardins-de-Napierville	Hannah Wolker	NDP candidate for Châteauguay—Lacolle in the 2021 federal election	Kanesatake		1,377	2.20	4th
Compton—Stanstead	Valerie Laliberté		Jacques-Cartier	Communications professional	2,124	3.24	4th
Drummond	François Choquette	Member of Parliament for Drummond (2011–2019)	Drummondville	Teacher	2,607	4.64	4th
Mégantic—L'Érable—Lotbinière	Gabriel D'Astous		Mont-Bellevue		1,086	1.85	4th
Richmond—Arthabaska	Nataël Bureau	NDP candidate for Richmond—Arthabaska in the 2021 federal election		IT professional	1,248	2.00	4th
Saint-Hyacinthe—Bagot—Acton	Raymonde Plamondon	Mayor of Saint-Valérien-de-Milton (2005–2017)	Saint-Valérien-de-Milton	Accountant	1,373	2.37	4th
Saint-Jean	Danielle Dubuc		Saint-Alexandre	Border guard	1,650	2.57	4th
Shefford	Patrick Jasmin	NDP candidate for Shefford in the 2021 federal election	Shefford	Paramedic	1,557	2.34	4th
Sherbrooke	Jean-Pierre Fortier		Sherbrooke	Engineer	3,516	5.77	4th

=== Greater Montreal ===
Riding	Candidate's Name	Notes	Residence	Occupation	Votes	%	Rank
Ahuntsic-Cartierville	Idil Issa		Outremont, Montreal	Writer	3,333	6.59	4th
Alfred-Pellan	Jordan Larochelle		Hull		2,044	3.39	4th
Beloeil—Chambly	Marie-Josée Béliveau	NDP candidate for Beloeil—Chambly in the 2021 federal election	Chambly	Instructor at Collège Ahuntsic	2,391	3.51	4th
Bourassa	Catherine Gauvin	NDP candidate for Bécancour—Nicolet—Saurel in the 2021 federal election	Montréal-Nord	Nurse	2,137	5.90	4th
Brossard—Saint-Lambert	Zeinab Mistou Akkaoui		Saint-Hubert, Longueuil	Social worker	2,049	3.49	4th
Dorval—Lachine—LaSalle	Angélique Soleil Lavoie	Québec solidaire candidate for Marguerite-Bourgeoys in the 2022 Quebec provincial election	Verdun, Montreal	Teacher	2,104	4.17	4th
Hochelaga—Rosemont-Est	Julie Girard-Lemay		Montreal	Lawyer	6,671	13.04	3rd
Honoré-Mercier	Djaouida Sellah	Member of Parliament for Saint-Bruno—Saint-Hubert (2011–2015)	Le Vieux-Longueuil	Physician	1,787	3.59	4th
La Pointe-de-l'Île	Ghada Chaabi	NDP candidate for Ahuntsic-Cartierville in the 2021 federal election	Saint-Henri, Montreal	Seniors' care professional	2,279	4.28	4th
La Prairie—Atateken	Mathieu Boisvert	NDP candidate for Mégantic—L'Érable in the 2021 and 2019 federal elections	Sainte-Catherine	Call centre supervisor	1,588	2.38	4th
Lac-Saint-Louis	Gregory Evdokias		Beaconsfield	Biologist	1,877	2.92	4th
LaSalle—Émard—Verdun	Craig Sauvé	Member of Montreal City Council for Saint-Henri-Est–Petite-Bourgogne–Pointe-Saint-Charles–Griffintown (2013–present); NDP candidate in the 2024 LaSalle—Émard—Verdun by-election	Pointe-Saint-Charles, Montreal		5,587	10.36	4th
Laurier—Sainte-Marie	Nimâ Machouf	NDP candidate for Laurier—Sainte-Marie in the 2021 and 2019 federal election Projet Montréal candidate in the 2009 and 2005 Montreal municipal election	Le Plateau-Mont-Royal, Montreal	Epidemiologist	9,856	18.81	2nd
Laval—Les Îles	Etienne Loiselle-Schiettekatte		Saint-Laurent	Food bank worker	1,961	3.45	4th
Longueuil—Charles-LeMoyne	Marie-Andrée Gravel		La Haute-Saint-Charles		2,832	5.56	4th
Longueuil—Saint-Hubert	Nesrine Benhadj		Longueuil	Project manager	2,986	5.05	4th
Marc-Aurèle-Fortin	Alexandrah Cardona-Fortin		Lachine	University student/Retail worker	2,128	3.70	4th
Mirabel	Albert Batten		Mirabel	Union leader (ILA)	1,333	2.37	4th
Mont-Saint-Bruno—L'Acadie	Mirabelle Leins		Carignan		1,843	2.70	4th
Mount Royal	Adam Frank		Downtown Montreal	Teacher	2,353	4.70	3rd
Notre-Dame-de-Grâce—Westmount	Malcolm Lewis-Richmond		Hull	Union official (IAMAW)	3,956	7.40	3rd
Outremont	Ève Péclet	Member of Parliament for La Pointe-de-l'Île (2011–2015)	Outremont, Montreal		5,024	10.66	4th
Papineau	Niall Ricardo		Le Plateau-Mont-Royal, Montreal		7,606	16.32	3rd
Pierre-Boucher—Les Patriotes—Verchères	Jean-François Filion		Côte-des-Neiges, Montreal	Lawyer	1,541	2.47	4th
Pierrefonds—Dollard	Kakou Richard Kouassi			Lawyer	1,613	2.82	4th
Rivière-des-Mille-Îles	Joseph Hakizimana	NDP candidate for Rivière-des-Mille-Îles in the 2021 and 2019 federal elections	Mirabel	Healthcare services manager	1,270	2.12	4th
Rosemont—La Petite-Patrie	Alexandre Boulerice	Member of Parliament for Rosemont—La Petite-Patrie (2011–present); Deputy Leader of the New Democratic Party (2019–present)	Montreal	Journalist	24,358	40.99	1st
Saint-Laurent	Ryan Byrne		Bois-Franc, Montreal		1,985	4.49	4th
Saint-Léonard—Saint-Michel	Marwan El-Attar		Montreal	Lawyer	2,450	5.97	4th
Terrebonne	Maxime Beaudoin		Hochelaga-Maisonneuve	Union official (APTS)	1,556	2.58	4th
Thérèse-De Blainville	Michel Lacroix		Downtown Ottawa		1,585	2.46	4th
Vaudreuil	Kalden Dhatsenpa	NDP candidate for Longueuil—Charles-LeMoyne in the 2021 and 2019 federal elections	Le Vieux-Longueuil	Writer	1,602	2.26	4th
Ville-Marie–Le Sud-Ouest–Île-des-Sœurs	Suzanne Dufresne		Pointe-Saint-Charles, Montreal		2,932	6.04	4th
Vimy	Cindy Mercer	NDP candidate for Alfred-Pellan in the 2021 federal election	Riverside South		2,425	4.87	4th

=== Northern Quebec ===
Riding	Candidate's Name	Notes	Residence	Occupation	Votes	%	Rank
Abitibi—Baie-James—Nunavik—Eeyou	Thai Dillon Higashihara			Project manager	752	2.46	4th
Abitibi—Témiscamingue	Jérémie Juneau	NDP candidate for Louis-Hébert in the 2019 federal election	Amos	Mine worker	1,480	2.95	4th
Chicoutimi—Le Fjord	Raphaël Émond		Laterrière	University student	991	1.95	4th
Jonquière	Lisa Garon	Mayor of Lamarche (2017–2021)	Lamarche	University professor	932	1.84	4th
Lac-Saint-Jean	Hugues Boily-Maltais		Dolbeau-Mistassini	Beekeeper	819	1.71	4th

=== Quebec City/Gaspé/Eastern Quebec ===
Riding	Candidate's Name	Notes	Residence	Occupation	Votes	%	Rank
Beauport—Limoilou	Raymond Côté	Member of Parliament for Beauport—Limoilou (2011–2015)	Vieux-Limoilou	Civil servant	2,095	3.41	4th
Bellechasse—Les Etchemins—Lévis	Marie-Philippe Gagnon-Gauthier	NDP candidate for Bellechasse—Les Etchemins—Lévis in the 2021 federal election	Trois-Pistoles	Public relations professional	1,621	2.48	4th
Charlesbourg—Haute-Saint-Charles	Dominique Harrisson		La Cité-Limoilou, Quebec City		1,752	2.68	4th
Côte-Nord—Kawawachikamach—Nitassinan	Marika Lalime		Montreal	University student	640	1.72	4th
Côte-du-Sud—Rivière-du-Loup—Kataskomiq—Témiscouata	Iseult L'Heureux-Hubert	President of UFCW Local 232		Executive assistant/union leader	1,072	1.70	4th
Gaspésie—Les Îles-de-la-Madeleine—Listuguj	Denise Giroux			Lawyer/labour relations professional	1,005	1.76	4th
Lévis—Lotbinière	Molly Cornish		Outremont		1,635	2.34	4th
Louis-Hébert	Jean-Paul Lussiaà-Berdou		Quebec City	Business development advisor	1,540	2.55	4th
Louis-Saint-Laurent—Akiawenhrahk	Colette Ducharme	NDP candidate for Louis-Saint-Laurent in the 2019 federal election			1,607	2.44	4th
Montmorency—Charlevoix	Gérard Briand		Montreal		905	1.52	4th
Québec Centre	Tommy Bureau	NDP candidate for Québec in the 2021 and 2019 federal elections	Saint-Roch, Quebec City	Union official (CSQ)	4,400	7.81	3rd
Rimouski-Neigette—Témiscouata—Les Basques	Salomé Salvain		Rivière-du-Loup	Speech therapist	946	1.78	4th

=== Western Quebec/Laurentides/Outaouais ===
Riding	Candidate's Name	Notes	Residence	Occupation	Votes	%	Rank
Argenteuil—La Petite-Nation	Michel Welt	NDP candidate for Argenteuil—La Petite-Nation in the 2021 federal election	Snowdon	Obstetrician-gynecologist	1,499	2.53	4th
Gatineau	Daniel Simoncic		Gatineau		1,615	2.81	4th
Hull—Aylmer	Pascale Matecki		Gatineau	Lecturer at the University of Ottawa	2,855	5.55	4th
Laurentides—Labelle	Michel Noël de Tilly		Sainte-Agathe-des-Monts	Physiotherapist	1,341	2.53	4th
Les Pays-d'en-Haut	Eric-Abel Baland	NDP candidate for Laurentides—Labelle in the 2021 federal election NDP candidate for Mount Royal in the 2019 federal election	Morin-Heights	Business strategist	1,493	2.27	4th
Pontiac—Kitigan Zibi	Gilbert Whiteduck	Chief of the Kitigan Zibi Anishinabeg (2008–2015)	Maniwaki	Educator	2,990	5.08	4th

== Saskatchewan ==
Riding	Candidate's Name	Notes	Residence	Occupation	Votes	%	Rank
Battlefords—Lloydminster—Meadow Lake	William Petryk		North Battleford	Accountant	1,816	4.8	3rd
Carlton Trail—Eagle Creek	Cheryl Loadman		Vanscoy	Professor at the University of Saskatchewan	2,616	5.6	3rd
Desnethé—Missinippi—Churchill River	Doug Racine	Saskatchewan NDP candidate for Saskatchewan Rivers in the 2024 Saskatchewan provincial election	La Ronge	Lawyer	850	9.4	3rd
Moose Jaw—Lake Centre—Lanigan	Britt Baumann		Dundurn	Bookkeeper	3,458	7.5	3rd
Prince Albert	Virginia Kutzan		Prince Albert	Work safety professional/small business owner	3,630	9.3	3rd
Regina—Lewvan	Ray Aldinger	NDP candidate for Regina—Qu'Appelle in the 2019 federal election	Regina	Corrections worker	2,573	5.9	3rd
Regina—Qu'Appelle	Chris Simmie	Candidate for Ward 10 in the 2024 Regina municipal election	Regina	Small business owner	3,388	8.0	3rd
Regina—Wascana	Kaitlyn Stadnyk	Saskatchewan NDP candidate in the 2023 Lumsden-Morse provincial by-election			2,138	4.9	3rd
Saskatoon South	Jacob Gadzella		Buena Vista, Saskatoon	Communications professional	4,515	9.1	3rd
Saskatoon—University	Melissa McGillivray		Saskatoon	Nurse	4,035	8.5	3rd
Saskatoon West	Rachel Loewen Walker		Caswell Hill, Saskatoon	Professor at the University of Saskatchewan	7,187	19.1	3rd
Souris—Moose Mountain	Sheena Muirhead-Koops		Macoun	Farmer	1,888	4.6	3rd
Swift Current—Grasslands—Kindersley	Alex McPhee	NDP candidate for Cypress Hills—Grasslands in the 2021 federal election	Val Marie	Cartographer	2,250	5.7	3rd
Yorkton—Melville	Michaela Krakowetz		Lintlaw		2,034	5.5	3rd

== The Territories ==
Riding	Candidate's Name	Notes	Residence	Occupation	Votes	%	Rank
Northwest Territories	Kelvin Kotchilea	NDP candidate for the Northwest Territories in the 2021 federal election Independent candidate for the 2021 Monfwi territorial by-election	Yellowknife/Behchokǫ̀	Civil servant	1,983	12.04	3rd
Nunavut	Lori Idlout	Member of Parliament for Nunavut (2021–present)	Igloolik	Lawyer/Non-profit executive	2,853	37.26	1st
Yukon	Katherine McCallum		Whitehorse	Professor at Yukon University	1,439	6.35	3rd
