= Yves Engler =

Canadian writer and activist (born 1979)

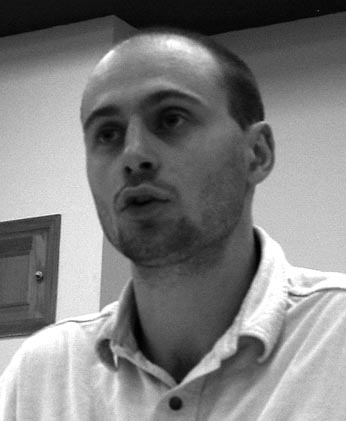
- Engler in 2005
- Born: 1979 (age 46–47); Vancouver, British Columbia, Canada
- Occupation: Writer
- Spouse: Bianca Mugyenyi
- Writing career
- Language: English
- Genre: Nonfiction
- Subjects: Canadian foreign policy; imperialism
- Notable work: The Black Book of Canadian Foreign Policy (2009)
- Website: yvesengler.com

Yves Engler (born 1979) is a Canadian writer, political activist, and critic of Canadian foreign policy based in Montreal. In addition to twelve published books, Engler's writings have appeared in alternative press and in publications such as The Ecologist. As an activist on foreign policy issues, Engler has filmed and posted to social media his public confrontations with politicians both at events and in the street.

Engler announced his candidacy in the 2026 New Democratic Party leadership election in July 2025 with the backing of the NDP Socialist Caucus. He was deemed ineligible to run by the party in December and later had his party membership revoked.

== Life and career ==
Engler moved to Montreal to study at Concordia University in the early 2000s, where he was elected vice president of communications with the Concordia Student Union. He was suspended from the university due to his involvement in the 2002 Concordia University Netanyahu riot, which erupted in response to a visit to the campus by then-former Israeli Prime Minister Benjamin Netanyahu.

A self-described "political activist agitator", Engler is known for his tactic of filming his street confrontations with cabinet ministers and other politicians on issues such as Israel–Palestine relations, Canada's involvement in Haiti, and Russia's 2022 invasion of Ukraine.

Engler was extensively interviewed for the six-part 2022 documentary series Truth to the Powerless: An Investigation into Canada's Foreign Policy, directed by Pitasanna Shanmugathas and Ryan Ellis, which examined the role of Canadian foreign policy in the international arena since the Second World War. He appeared in the series as a featured interviewee alongside academics, former diplomats, politicians, and foreign policy commentators.

=== NDP leadership campaign ===
In July 2025, Engler announced his intention to run as a candidate in the 2026 New Democratic Party leadership election. His campaign was supported by the socialist caucus of the NDP. Engler officially submitted his application in November. In December, he was deemed ineligible by the NDP's three-person Leadership Vote Committee. He requested a formal review of the decision, which was upheld by an independent Review Committee. Among the committee's reasons for rejecting him, they alleged that he had repeated "Russian state propaganda with respect to the Russo-Ukrainian war and Nato" and accused him of having made "comments consistent with antisemitic rhetoric". Engler denied these allegations, and said that he had publicly condemned both Russia's invasion of Ukraine and antisemitism "on dozens of occasions". The reasoning for his disqualification also mentioned an "unclear commitment to the NDP", referencing a Bluesky profile with Engler's name that posted about running for the Green Party, which Engler said was someone falsely impersonating him.

In January 2026, his wife, Bianca Mugyenyi, who co-founded the Canadian Foreign Policy Institute and served as its director until 2025, filed to run in the race. Mugyenyi, who had helped coordinate her husband's campaign, said she would carry forward with his platform, which would offer a "real break with militarism and capitalism" and fight for an economy where everyone's basic needs are met. She said it was undemocratic for the NDP to block her husband from running and that she would step aside if their decision was reversed. Mugyenyi was also rejected by the party's vetting committee, who deemed her to be a "proxy candidate".

In March 2026, his NDP Engler's ership was terminated for "conduct fundamentally inconsistent with the obligations of membership and contrary to the constitution and principles of the party".

== Views ==
=== Haiti ===
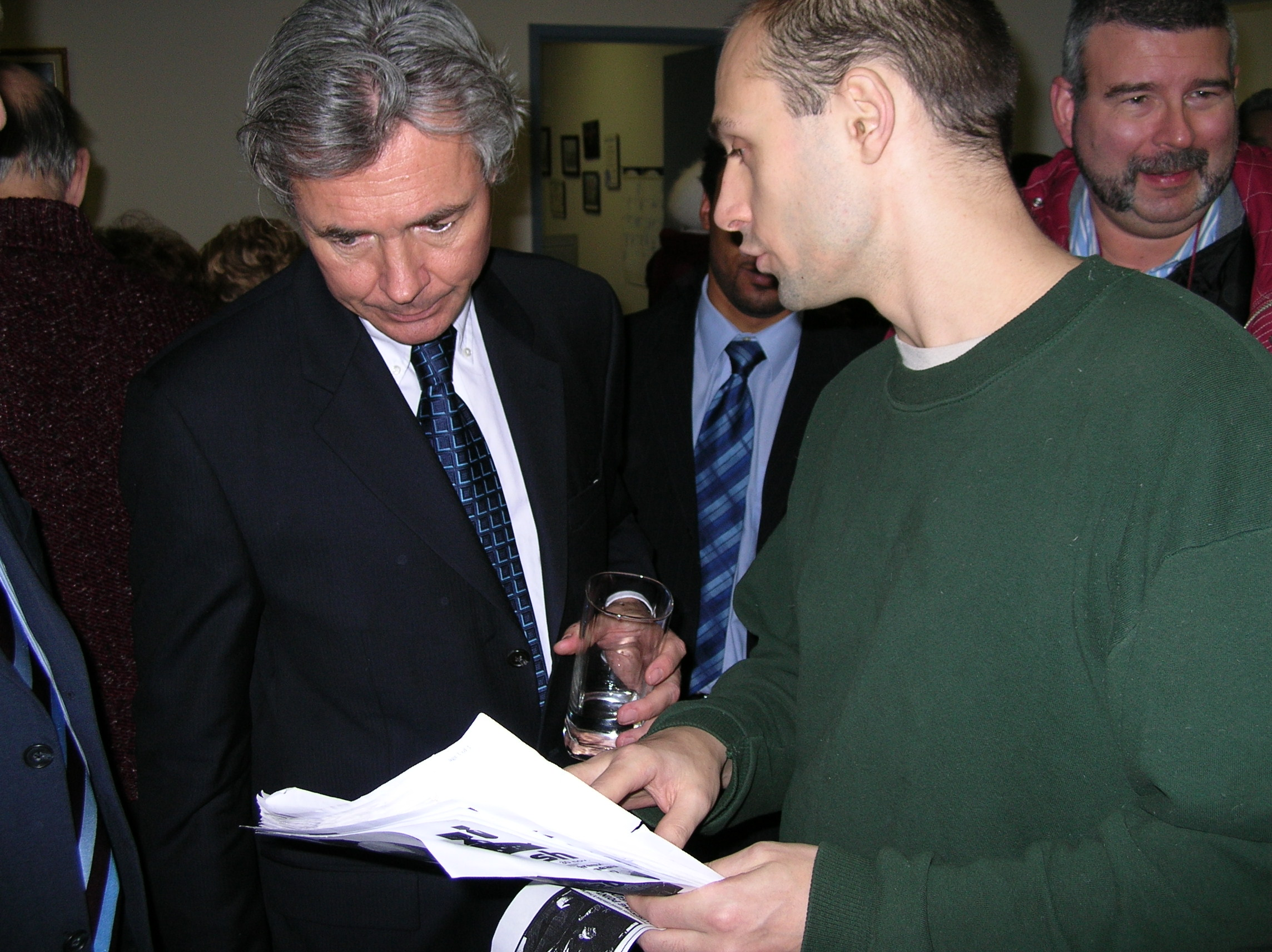
Engler presenting Pierre Pettigrew with a copy of the "Griffin Report on Human Rights Abuses in Haiti"

Engler was critical of Canada's role in the 2004 Haitian coup d'état. In June 2005, he interrupted a press conference being held by then-Canadian Minister of Foreign Affairs, Pierre Pettigrew. Engler poured a bottle of cranberry juice onto Pettigrew and said, "Pettigrew lies, Haitians die". The juice was meant to represent the blood Engler said was on the hands of the Canadian government due to its alleged involvement in the 2004 coup and subsequent United Nations peacekeeping mission.

=== Israel ===
A vocal critic of Israel, in 2010, Engler wrote the book Canada and Israel: Building Apartheid on the history of Canada's ties with Israel. He is a longtime supporter of the international campaign for Boycott, Divestment and Sanctions against the Israeli occupation of Palestine.

In 2016, Engler wrote an essay for the Huffington Post, titled "'Anti Semitism': The Most Abused Word in Canada". A week later, The Canadian Jewish News editor Yoni Goldstein criticized the text in an opinion piece, concluding that Engler "has seriously misjudged the state of anti-Semitism in Canada today". Engler has said that the charge of antisemitism is wrongly used to shut down criticism of Israel and that he strongly condemns real antisemitism.

== Legal issues ==
In 2002, a student tribunal found Engler guilty of assault and vandalism for his part in the Concordia University Netanyahu riot. He was fined $500 and expelled for one term. Engler said he did not assault anyone or commit any vandalism during the riot. His attempt to appeal the suspension was rejected by the Supreme Court of Canada. Engler's suspension was later made permanent when he violated a ban on political activity, imposed by the university in the aftermath of the riot, by handing out anti-FTAA pamphlets on university grounds.

In 2006, Engler pleaded guilty to forgery and was fined $100. In 2023, he was found guilty of breaching a Montreal bylaw for gluing, nailing, or stapling on urban furniture.

In 2022, he was charged with assault and causing a disturbance near a public place but was acquitted after agreeing to keep the peace for 12 months.

In February 2025, Engler was accused of online harassment of a pro-Israel social media personality and then of harassing and obstructing a police officer investigating the allegations by coordinating an email campaign urging her to "drop charges" against him. On November 28, he stood trial on three charges relating to the officer, after the original charges of harassment were dropped. In January 2026, Engler was convicted of two counts of harassment and one count of obstruction for the email campaign. On March 4, 2026, he was sentenced to two years of probation and 50 hours of community service.

== Published works ==
- Canada in Haiti: Waging War on the Poor Majority with Anthony Fenton. Co-published by RED Publishing and Fernwood Publishing, August 2005. ISBN 1-55266-168-7
- Playing Left Wing: From Rink Rat to Student Radical (RED/Fernwood Publishing, 2005) ISBN 978-1552661697
- The Black Book of Canadian Foreign Policy. Co-published by RED Publishing and Fernwood Publishing, April 2009. ISBN 978-1-55266-314-1
- Canada and Israel: Building Apartheid. Co-published by RED Publishing and Fernwood Publishing, February 2010. ISBN 978-1-55266-355-4
- Stop Signs: Cars and Capitalism on the Road to Economic, Social and Ecological Decay with Bianca Mugyenyi, Published April 2011; ISBN 978-1-55266-384-4
- Lester Pearson's Peacekeeping The Truth May Hurt. ISBN 978-1-55266-510-7 Fernwood Publishing (September 1, 2012)
- The Ugly Canadian: Stephen Harper's Foreign Policy. Co-published with: Red Publishing ISBN 978-1-55266-530-5 (Published: 2012)
- Canada in Africa: 300 years of aid and exploitation. Co-published by RED Publishing and Fernwood Publishing, August 2015. ISBN 978-1-55266-762-0
- A Propaganda System — How Government, Corporations, Media and Academia Sell War and Exploitation, Fall 2016.
- Left, Right: Marching to the Beat of Imperial Canada. Black Rose Books, 2019. ISBN 978-1-55164-663-3
- House of Mirrors: Justin Trudeau's Foreign Policy. RED Publishing/Black Rose Books, 2020
- Stand on Guard for Whom? — A People's History of the Canadian Military Black Rose Books, October 2021. ISBN 978-1-55164-757-9
- Canada's Long Fight Against Democracy with Owen Schalk. Baraka Books, 2024. ISBN 978-1-7718-6342-1
