= Leadnow =

Canadian non-profit independent citizens' advocacy organization

- Formation: 2010
- Type: Non-profit
- Purpose: Healthy environment, just society, fair economy, open democracy
- Members: 500,000
- Website: www.leadnow.ca

Leadnow (French: A L'action) is a Canadian non-profit, independent citizens' advocacy organization founded in 2010. It campaigns for a just, sustainable, and equitable Canada, built and defended through the democratic power of an engaged public.

The organization has been a vocal opponent to the Trans Mountain Pipeline.

"Vote Together" was Leadnow's 2015 election campaign, "the best-organized strategic voting project [the] election, with a footprint in dozens of ridings", according to The Globe and Mail. According to the BBC, the campaign utilized flash mob tactics to engage unregistered voters with "vote mobs". Amara Possian, campaign manager for Vote Together, told The New York Times in 2015 that "the long-term objective of Vote Together is to make strategic voting obsolete by replacing Canada's winner-take-all system".

After the 2015 election, Leadnow supporters campaigned to change the voting system from first-past-the-post to some form of proportional representation. They were unsuccessful when the Liberal government abandoned its promise "to ensure that 2015 will be the last federal election conducted under the first-past-the-post voting system" in February 2017.
