= Canada's Young New Democrats =

Youth wing of the New Democratic Party of Canada

New Democratic Youth of Canada Jeunes néo-démocrates du Canada
- Co-Chairperson: Linnea Löfström-Abary; Rosa Wang
- Ideology: Democratic socialism
- Position: Left-wing
- Mother party: New Democratic Party
- International affiliation: International Union of Socialist Youth
- Slogan: Socialism In Our Lifetime. (English); Pour un avenir socialiste. (French)

Canada's Young New Democrats (CYND) (French: Jeunes néo-démocrates du Canada (JNDC)), officially the New Democratic Youth of Canada, are the youth wing of the New Democratic Party of Canada. Any party member, aged 25 or under is automatically a member of the CYND and is eligible to attend and vote in the youth wing's convention.

The minimum membership age ranges from 12 to 14 depending on the province. Additionally, some provincial branches of the YND extend membership eligibility up to age 30. The current co-chairs of the organization, Linnea Löfström-Abary and Rosa Wang, were elected during the 2026 federal NDP convention, along with the rest of its executive. The CYND is autonomous of the main party. It sends its own delegates to the federal convention and council. It typically elects its executives for two year terms at its own convention, usually held the day before the NDP holds its conventions.

Traditionally, members of NDP youth wings have tended to be more ideologically left-wing than the rest of the party. For example, the Ontario New Democratic Youth was dissolved by its parent party in 1972 for supporting The Waffle. Provincial youth wings were also key backers of the New Politics Initiative in 2001. During the modernization process under the leadership of Jack Layton, the youth wing grew to encompass a broader progressive base of youth, but has since return to its more ideological character. At the 2026 federal convention in Winnipeg, a democratic socialist slate was elected to lead CYND, including members aligned with the Avi Lewis campaign.

== Removal of Thomas Mulcair ==
In the lead up to the 2015 election, the CYND had been openly critical of leader Thomas Mulcair when he broke with long standing NDP principles, in particular on matters of foreign policy. After the stunning 2015 election that saw Thomas Mulcair lose official opposition status, the party was heading into a leadership review at 2016 convention in Edmonton.

One month before the leadership review CYND members from two Montreal Universities published an open letter in Le Devoir calling on Thomas Mulcair to resign. Pressure continued to mount on Mulcair when it was reported that NDP McGill had submitted a resolution to CYND convention that would urge all CYND member delegates to vote for a leadership race.

On the eve of the Edmonton convention, the CYND published an open letter urging members to vote for party renewal, becoming the first official section of the NDP to call for members to "support a new direction, and a new style of leadership." Many members of the CYND spoke out about the need for party renewal throughout convention, organizing votes to trigger a leadership election. A few days later, the membership of the NDP followed the lead of the CYND with a majority of the delegates to the Edmonton Convention voting for a new leadership race. This was the first time in Canadian history that a leader of a political party had lost a leadership review.

The process started at the 2016 Edmonton Convention culminated for a new leadership in the election of Ontario NDP MPP Jagmeet Singh on October 1, 2017, after he won on first ballot with 53.8 per cent of the vote. Under Singh's leadership, the CYND's influence within the NDP was reduced.
