= Riding association =

Political party unit in Canadian Politics

In the politics of Canada, the electoral district association (French: association de circonscription enregistrée), commonly known as a riding association (French: association de comté) or constituency association, is the main local unit of a political party at the level of the electoral district ("riding"). Major political parties attempt to have a riding association in each constituency, although usually these associations are more active in ridings where the party has an elected Member of Parliament or has a reasonable chance of electing an MP in the future, and less active in ridings where the party's prospects have historically been poor.

Most riding associations have an elected executive and attempt to have activities for local party members at regular intervals. At a minimum, riding associations hold an annual general meeting to elect the executive and meetings to elect delegates to national and regional party policy conventions. Riding associations are most active during election campaigns when they participate, along with the party's national or regional campaign teams, in organizing the riding's election campaign. In addition, the party constitution usually allows each riding association to hold a nomination meeting, which selects the party's local candidate. However, some party constitutions allow the leader to bypass the riding association and appoint a candidate of their choosing, although virtually all parties maintain limits on the number of ridings where the leader may do so.

The other time when riding associations are most active are in the lead up to leadership conventions. Riding associations were more important in this aspect in the past, when they would elect supporters of a particular leadership candidate to participate as delegates at a leadership convention. Many parties, however, have moved away from the delegated system of electing a leader to a one member, one vote system in which all party members vote by ballot.

However, as the riding association remains the prime point of contact between members and the party they remain important for leadership candidates in their attempt to gain support, and prospective leadership candidates will often attempt to win control of a riding association's executive when it is elected at the annual general meeting even if a leadership election is not anticipated for several years.

Riding associations also exist at the provincial level and operate in the same manner. In Ontario, where federal and provincial electoral districts mainly overlap, riding associations may have a unified federal-provincial structure, but typically have separate federal and provincial officers.

== See also ==
- Conservative Association
- Constituency Labour Party
