= Brad Lavigne =

Canadian political operative and lobbyist

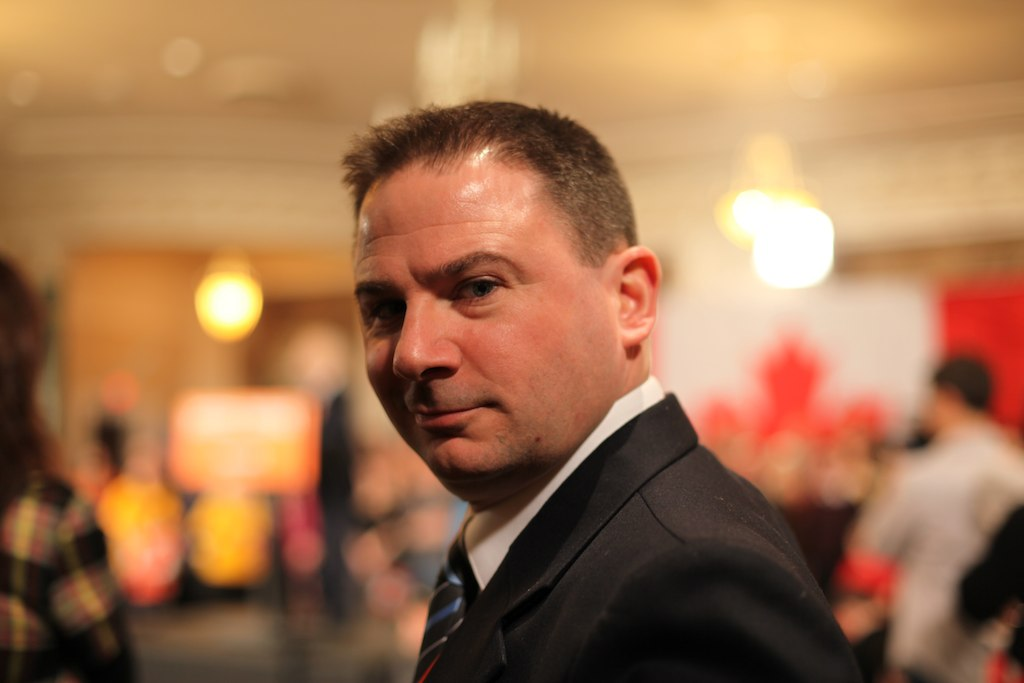
Lavigne in 2011

Brad Lavigne is a Canadian political and corporate communications strategist.

== Biography ==
In the 2015 federal general election, Lavigne was a Senior Campaign Advisor to the New Democratic Party of Canada and Tom Mulcair.

Prior to this role, Brad was a Vice President with Hill+Knowlton Strategies in Ottawa. During that time he was also registered as a lobbyist in Ontario for the Canadian Fuels Associations.

From July 2011 to March 2012, he was the Principal Secretary to the Leader of the Official Opposition in Canada.

Lavigne was the National Campaign Director for the New Democratic Party of Canada (NDP) during the 2011 Canadian federal election that resulted in the party's best election result in its 50-year history, gaining over 4.5 million votes and 103 seats, making the New Democratic Party Canada's Official Opposition.

Between 2009 and 2011, Lavigne served as National Director of the NDP, overseeing the political and administrative operations of the federal party.

From 2006 to 2009, Lavigne served as Director of Strategic Communications for the Hon. Jack Layton and from 2003 to 2006 Director of Communications for the party.

For years, Lavigne has been a regular columnist for The Hill Times newspaper and a regular panelist on both CBC Newsworld and CTV News Channel.

Prior to his assignments with the federal party, Lavigne worked for the British Columbia New Democratic Government. Between 1998 and 2001 Lavigne worked as an advisor in office of the Premier of British Columbia as well as an Assistant to the Minister of Finance and the Minister of Advanced Education, Training & Technology.

In November 2013, Lavigne released Building the Orange Wave: The Inside Story of the Historic Rise of Jack Layton and the NDP.

He was scathing of Liberal leader Justin Trudeau when he proceeded to paraphrase the late Jack Layton in an effort to criticise the NDP.

He is portrayed by Zachary Bennett in the 2013 CBC Television film Jack.
