= Canadians for Justice and Peace in the Middle East =

Canadian political advocacy organization

- Abbreviation: CJPME
- Established: 2002
- Type: Political advocacy
- Headquarters: Montreal, Canada
- Coordinates: 45.547606°N 73.66216°W
- Website: cjpme.org

Canadians for Justice and Peace in the Middle East (CJPME) is a Canadian pro-Palestine advocacy organization established in 2002.

In November 2011, it criticised the Canadian government for not condemning the Israeli government's plan to expand a number of its settlements, which are considered illegal under international law as interpreted by the International Court of Justice.

It adopted its current name in 2004.
