= 2025 Canadian federal election in Manitoba =

- April 28, 2025

All 14 Manitoban seats in the House of Commons
- Registered: 950,577
- Turnout: 639,282 (67.25%) ▲5.25%
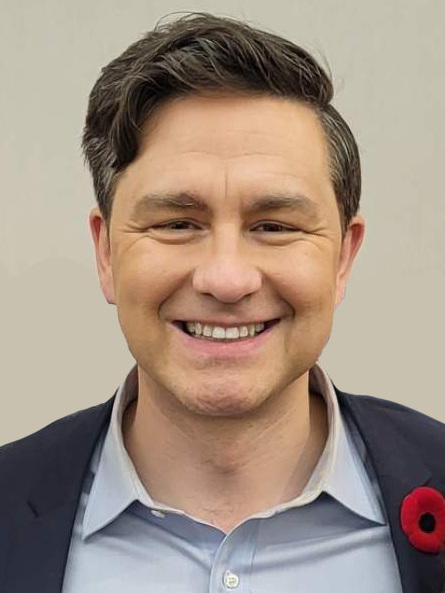

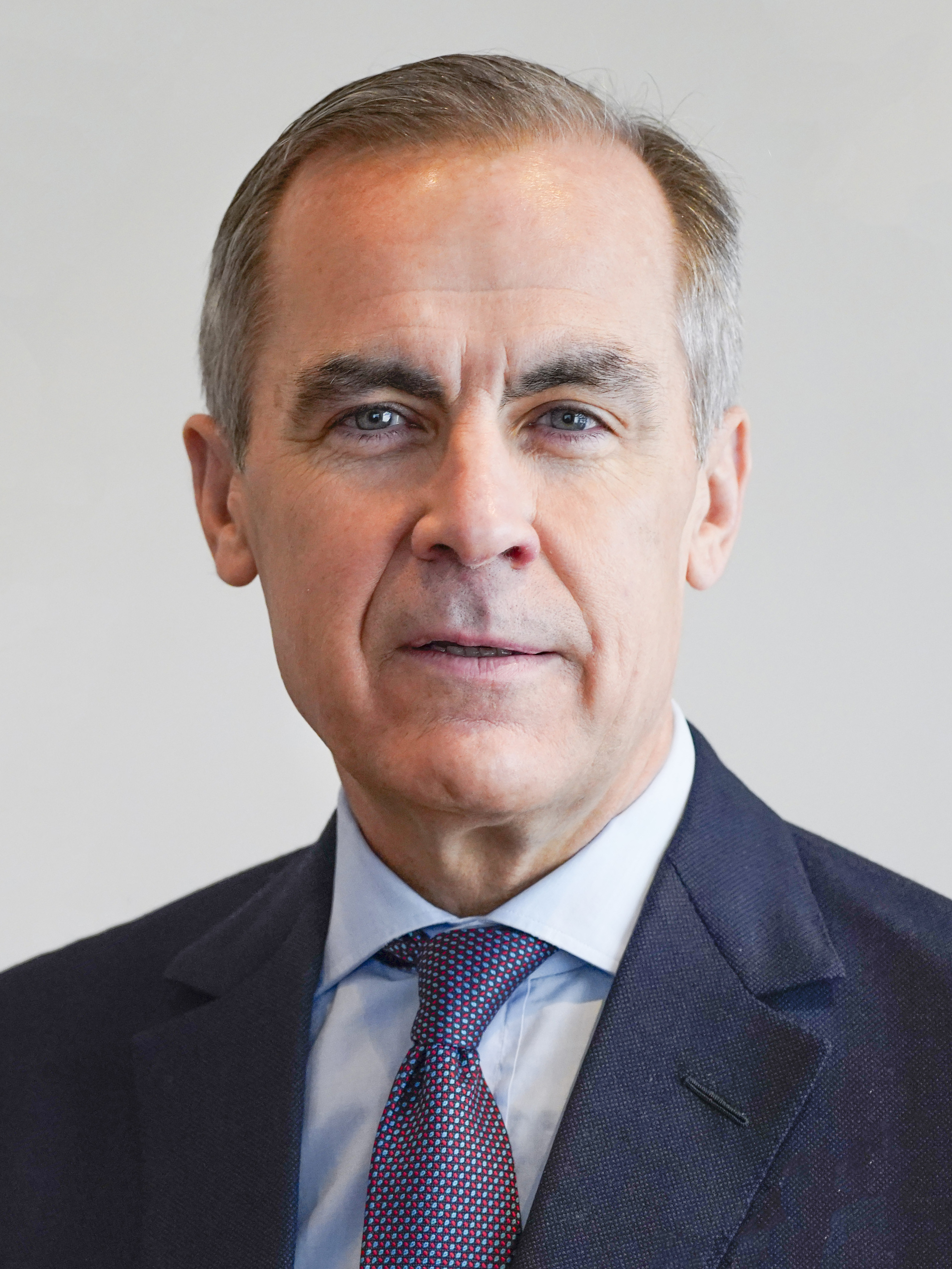

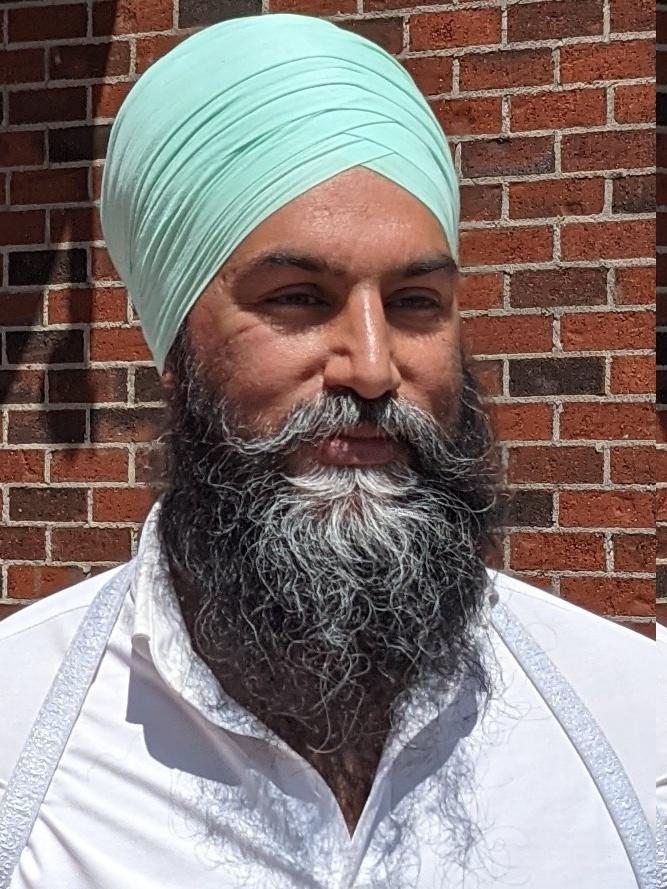
	First party	Second party	Third party
Leader	Pierre Poilievre	Mark Carney	Jagmeet Singh
Party	Conservative	Liberal	New Democratic
Leader since	September 10, 2022	March 9, 2025	October 1, 2017
Last election	7 seats, 39.2%	4 seats, 27.9%	3 seats, 23.0%
Seats before	7	4	3
Seats won	7	6	1
Seat change	0	▲2	▼2
Popular vote	296,166	260,610	70,574
Percentage	46.3%	40.8%	11.0%
Swing	▲7.1%	▲12.9%	▼12.0%
Prime minister before election
Mark Carney
Liberal
Prime minister after election
Mark Carney
Liberal

In the 2025 Canadian federal election, 14 members of Parliament were elected to the House of Commons from the province of Manitoba (4.1% of all members).

== 2022 electoral redistribution ==
The 2025 Canadian federal election was the first election to utilize the electoral districts established following the 2022 Canadian federal electoral redistribution. The House of Commons increased from 338 seats to 343 seats. Manitoba's seat allocation stayed the same at 14 seats. This ensures that the average population per constituency in Manitoba is 95,868 (according to the 2021 Canadian census), which is 11,980 less people per electoral district than the national average.

== Timeline ==
Changes in Manitoban seats held (2021–2025)
Seat	Before				Change		
Seat	Date	Member	Party	Reason	Date	Member	Party
Winnipeg South Centre	December 12, 2022	Jim Carr	█ Liberal	Died in office	June 19, 2023	Ben Carr	█ Liberal
Portage—Lisgar	February 28, 2023	Candice Bergen	█ Conservative	Resigned	June 19, 2023	Branden Leslie	█ Conservative
Elmwood—Transcona	March 31, 2024	Daniel Blaikie	█ New Democratic	Resigned to work with Premier of Manitoba Wab Kinew	September 16, 2024	Leila Dance	█ New Democratic

== Predictions ==
Polling firm	Last date of polling	Link	LPC	CPC	NDP	GPC	PPC	Others	Margin of error (Note: In cases when linked poll details distinguish between the margin of error associated with the total sample of respondents (including undecided and non-voters) and that of the subsample of decided/leaning voters, the former is included in the table. Also not included is the margin of error created by rounding to the nearest whole number or any margin of error from methodological sources. Most online polls (because of their opt-in method of recruiting panelists which results in a non-random sample) cannot have a margin of error. In such cases, shown is what the margin of error would be for a survey using a random probability-based sample of equivalent size.)	Sample size (Note: Refers to the total, "raw" sample size, including undecided and non-voters, and before demographic weighting is applied. Fractions in parentheses apply to rolling polls (see below) and indicate the proportion of the sample that is independent from the previous poll in the series.)	Polling method (Note: "Telephone" refers to traditional telephone polls conducted by live interviewers; "IVR" refers to automated Interactive Voice Response polls conducted by telephone; "online" refers to polls conducted exclusively over the internet; "telephone/online" refers to polls which combine results from both telephone and online surveys, or for which respondents are initially recruited by telephone and then asked to complete an online survey. "Rolling" polls contain overlapping data from one poll to the next.)	Lead
Probe Research	April 14, 2025		43	40	15	1	1	—N/a	± 3.5 pp	800	IVR + online	3
Probe Research	March 16, 2025		44	42	9	2	2	—N/a	± 3.1 pp	1,000	IVR + online	2
Probe Research	February 6, 2025		28	45	22	3	2	—N/a	± 4.0 pp	600	IVR + online	17
Probe Research	December 10, 2024		19	52	24	2	2	—N/a	± 3.1 pp	1,000	IVR + online	28
Probe Research	September 15, 2024		21	50	24	2	3	—N/a	± 3.1 pp	1,000	IVR + online	26
Probe Research	March 18, 2024		23	47	26	2	—N/a	1	± 3.1 pp	1,000	IVR + online	21

== Results ==
=== Summary ===
Manitoban summary seat results in the 2025 Canadian federal election
Party	Votes	Vote %	Vote +/-	Seats	Seat +/-
Conservative	296,166	46.3%	▲7.1pp	7 / 14 (50%)	0
Liberal	260,610	40.8%	▲12.9pp	6 / 14 (43%)	▲2
New Democratic	70,574	11.0%	▼12.0pp	1 / 14 (7%)	▼2
People's	6,103	1.0%	▼6.6pp	0 / 14 (0%)	0
Green	4,678	0.7%	▼1.0pp	0 / 14 (0%)	0
Independents and minor parties	1,151	0.2%	▼0.5pp	0 / 14 (0%)	0
Total	639,282	100%	–	14 / 14 (100%)	0

=== Comparison with national results ===
Results by party
Party	Popular vote %			Seats in caucus
Party	MB	Natl.	diff.	Seats in caucus
Conservative	46.3	41.3	+5.0	7 / 144 (5%)
Liberal	40.8	43.7	-2.9	6 / 169 (4%)
New Democratic	11.0	6.3	+4.7	1 / 7 (14%)
People's	1.0	0.7	+0.3	no caucus
Green	0.7	1.2	-0.5	0 / 1 (0%)
Total	–	–	–	14 / 343 (4%)

== Student vote results ==
Student votes are mock elections that run parallel to actual elections, in which students not of voting age participate. They are administered by Student Vote Canada. These are for educational purposes and do not count towards the results.

Summary of the 2025 Canadian Student Vote in Manitoba
Party	Leader	Seats			Popular vote		
Party	Leader	Elected	%	Δ	Votes	%	Δ (pp)
Conservative	Pierre Poilievre	8	57.14	▲3	14,806	35.74	▲11.05
Liberal	Mark Carney	4	28.57	▲3	12,142	29.31	▲7.64
New Democratic	Jagmeet Singh	2	14.29	▼6	8,890	21.46	▼11.78
Green	Elizabeth May & Jonathan Pedneault	0	0	0	2,885	6.96	▼1.97
People's	Maxime Bernier	0	0	0	2,041	4.93	▼3.01
Independent and minor parties		0	0	0	666	1.61	▼1.92
Total		14	100.00	0	41,430	100.00	–
Source: Student Vote Canada

== See also ==
- Canadian federal election results in Winnipeg
- Canadian federal election results in Rural Manitoba
