= 2025 Canadian federal election in Prince Edward Island =

- April 28, 2025

All 4 Prince Edward Island seats in the House of Commons
- Registered: 123,822
- Turnout: 97,046 (78.38%)
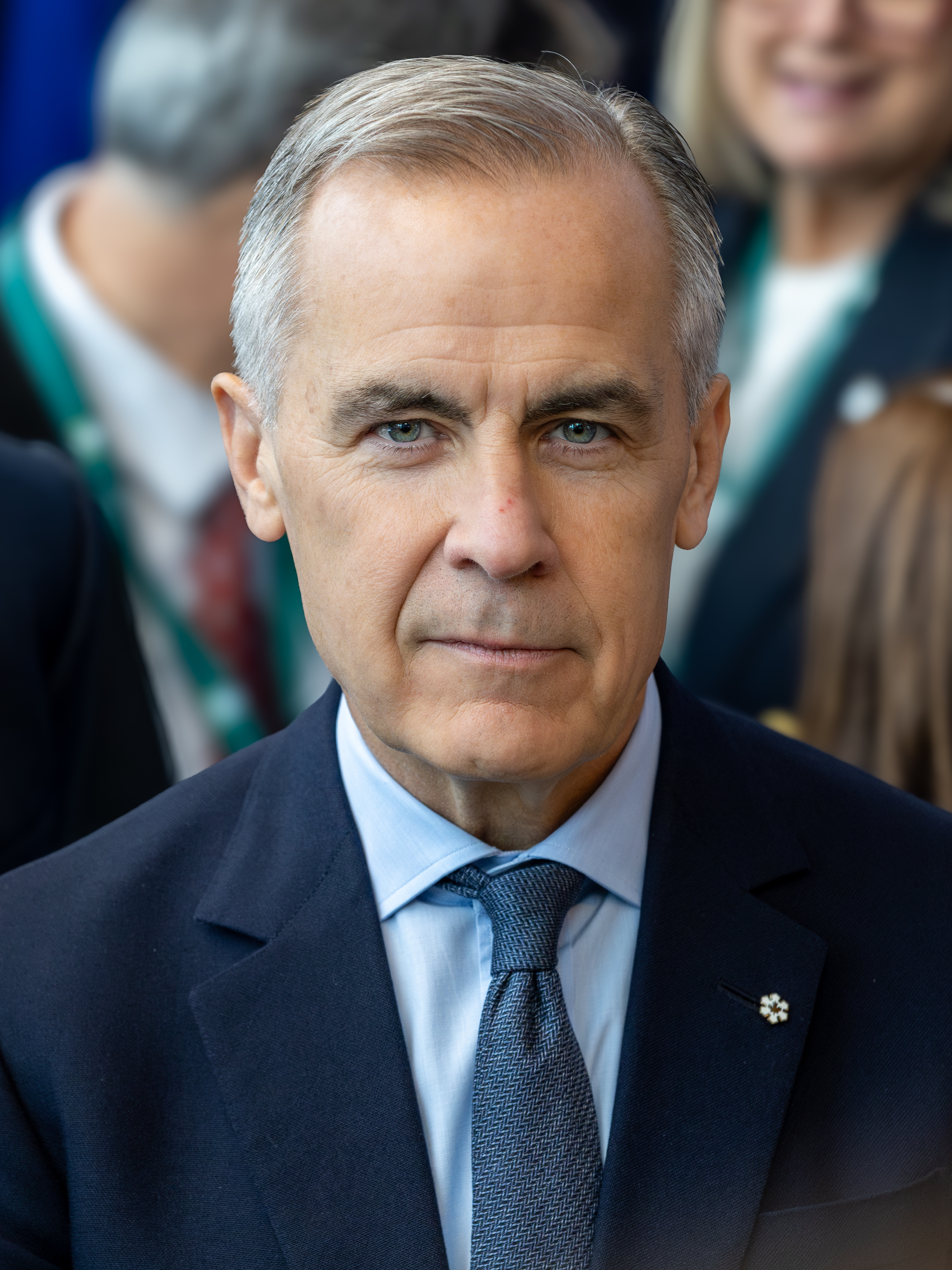

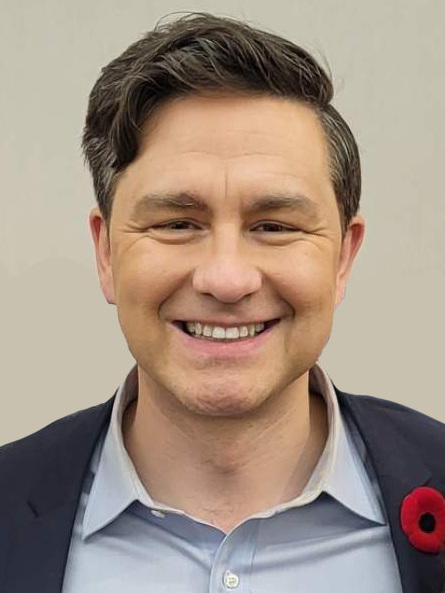
	First party	Second party
Leader	Mark Carney	Pierre Poilievre
Party	Liberal	Conservative
Leader since	March 9, 2025	September 10, 2022
Last election	4 seats, 46.2%	0 seats, 31.6%
Seats before	4	0
Seats won	4	0
Seat change	0	0
Popular vote	55,830	35,798
Percentage	57.5%	36.9%
Swing	▲11.3%	▲5.3%

Liberal
30–35%
35–40%
40–45%
45–50%
50–55%
55–60%
60–65%
65–70%
>70%
Conservative
30–35%
35–40%
40–45%
45–50%
50–55%
55–60%
60–65%
65–70%
>70%
Prime minister before election
Mark Carney
Liberal
Prime minister after election
Mark Carney
Liberal

In the 2025 Canadian federal election, 4 members of Parliament were elected to the House of Commons from the province of Prince Edward Island (1.17% of all members).

== 2022 electoral redistribution ==
The 2025 Canadian federal election was the first election to utilize the electoral districts established following the 2022 Canadian federal electoral redistribution. The House of Commons increased from 338 seats to 343 seats. Prince Edward Island's seat allocation stayed the same at 4 seats. This ensures that the average population per constituency in Prince Edward Island is 38,583 (according to the 2021 Canadian census), which is 69,265 less people per electoral district than the national average.

== Predictions ==
Polling firm	Last date of polling	Link	LPC	CPC	NDP	GPC	PPC	Others	Margin of error (Note: In cases when linked poll details distinguish between the margin of error associated with the total sample of respondents (including undecided and non-voters) and that of the subsample of decided/leaning voters, the former is included in the table. Also not included is the margin of error created by rounding to the nearest whole number or any margin of error from methodological sources. Most online polls (because of their opt-in method of recruiting panelists which results in a non-random sample) cannot have a margin of error. In such cases, shown is what the margin of error would be for a survey using a random probability-based sample of equivalent size.)	Sample size (Note: Refers to the total, "raw" sample size, including undecided and non-voters, and before demographic weighting is applied. Fractions in parentheses apply to rolling polls (see below) and indicate the proportion of the sample that is independent from the previous poll in the series.)	Polling method (Note: "Telephone" refers to traditional telephone polls conducted by live interviewers; "IVR" refers to automated Interactive Voice Response polls conducted by telephone; "online" refers to polls conducted exclusively over the internet; "telephone/online" refers to polls which combine results from both telephone and online surveys, or for which respondents are initially recruited by telephone and then asked to complete an online survey. "Rolling" polls contain overlapping data from one poll to the next.)	Lead
Narrative Research	August 18, 2024		35	41	10	13	1	0	± 2.6 pp	300	Telephone	6

== Results ==
=== Summary ===
No seats changed hands in Prince Edward Island. The Liberal and Conservative parties both increased their vote share compared to the previous election. The NDP and Green party both faced significant drops in support. Turnout was over 78%, the highest of any province.

Prince Edward Island summary seat results in the 2025 Canadian federal election
Party	Votes	Vote %	Vote +/-	Seats	Seat +/-
Liberal	55,830	57.5%	▲11.3pp	4 / 4 (100%)	0
Conservative	35,798	36.9%	▲5.3pp	0 / 4 (0%)	0
New Democratic	2,417	2.5%	▼6.7pp	0 / 4 (0%)	0
Green	2,158	2.2%	▼7.4pp	0 / 4 (0%)	0
People's	439	0.4%	▼2.8pp	0 / 10 (0%)	0
Independents	404	0.4%	▲0.2pp	0 / 4 (0%)	0
Total	97,046	100%	–	4 / 4 (100%)	0

=== Comparison with national results ===
Results by party
Party	Popular vote %			Seats in caucus
Party	PE	Natl.	diff.	Seats in caucus
Liberal	57.5	43.7	+13.8	4 / 169 (2%)
Conservative	36.9	41.3	-4.4	0 / 144 (0%)
New Democratic	2.5	6.3	-3.8	0 / 7 (0%)
Green	2.2	1.2	+1.0	0 / 1 (0%)
People's	0.4	0.7	-0.3	no caucus
Total	–	–	–	4 / 343 (1%)

== Student Vote results ==
Student votes are mock elections that run parallel to actual elections, in which students not of voting age participate. They are administered by Student Vote Canada. These are for educational purposes and do not count towards the results.

Summary of the 2025 Canadian Student Vote in Prince Edward Island
Party	Leader	Seats			Popular vote		
Party	Leader	Elected	%	Δ	Votes	%	Δ (pp)
Liberal	Mark Carney	3	75.0	▼1	3,236	40.27	▲9.23
Conservative	Pierre Poilievre	1	25.0	▲1	2,861	35.61	▲9.90
Green	Elizabeth May & Jonathan Pedneault	0	0	0	812	10.11	▼7.30
New Democratic	Jagmeet Singh	0	0	0	783	9.74	▼8.96
People's	Maxime Bernier	0	0	0	244	2.79	▼3.33
Independent		0	0	0	119	1.48	▲1.48
Total		4	100.00	0	8,055	100.00	–
Source: Student Vote Canada
