= 2025 Canadian federal election in Nova Scotia =

- April 28, 2025

All 11 Nova Scotian seats in the House of Commons
- Registered: 799,595
- Turnout: 577,740 (72.25%)
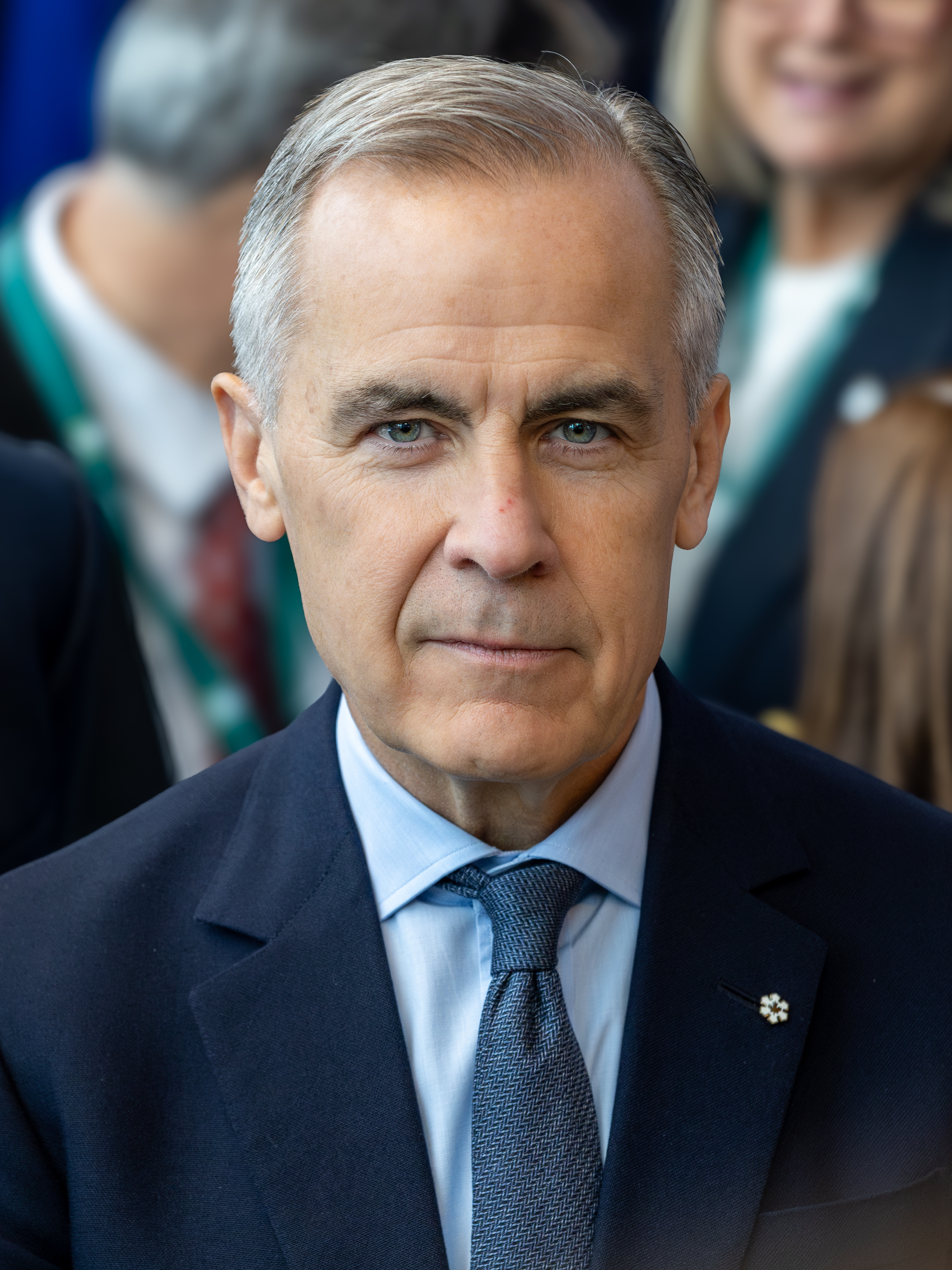

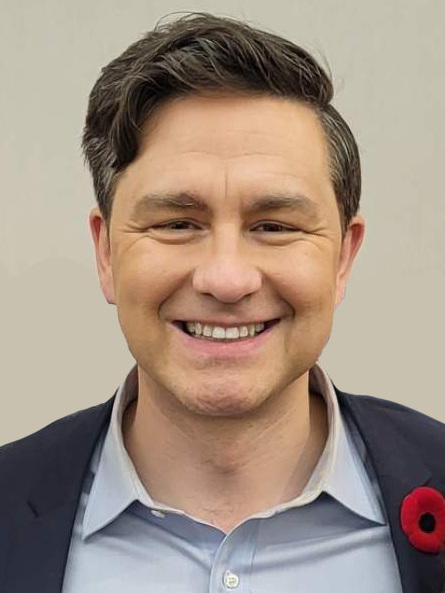

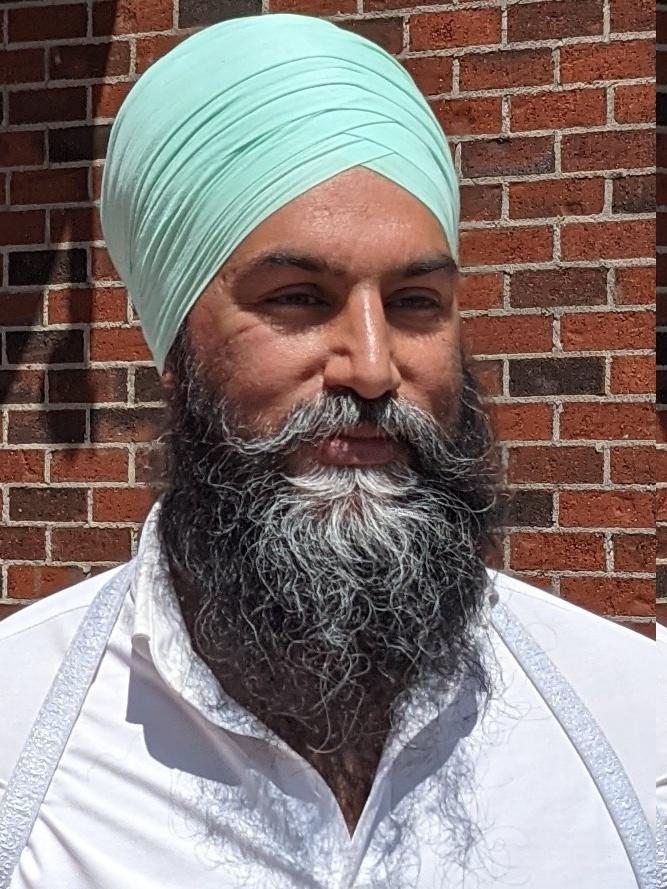
	First party	Second party	Third party
Leader	Mark Carney	Pierre Poilievre	Jagmeet Singh
Party	Liberal	Conservative	New Democratic
Leader since	March 9, 2025	September 10, 2022	October 1, 2017
Last election	8 seats, 42.3%	3 seats, 29.4%	0 seats, 22.1%
Seats before	7	3	0
Seats won	10	1	0
Seat change	▲3	▼2	0
Popular vote	330,556	203,290	30,129
Percentage	57.2%	35.2%	5.2%
Swing	▲14.9%	▲5.8%	▼16.9%
Prime minister before election
Mark Carney
Liberal
Prime minister after election
Mark Carney
Liberal

In the 2025 Canadian federal election, 11 members of Parliament were elected to the House of Commons from the province of Nova Scotia (3.2% of all members).

== 2022 electoral redistribution ==
The 2025 Canadian federal election was the first election to utilize the electoral districts established following the 2022 Canadian federal electoral redistribution. The House of Commons increased from 338 seats to 343 seats. Nova Scotia's seat allocation stayed the same at 11 seats. This ensures that the average population per constituency in Nova Scotia is 88,126 (according to the 2021 Canadian census), which is 19,722 less people per electoral district than the national average.

== Timeline ==
Changes in Nova Scotian seats held (2021–2025)
Seat	Before				Change		
Seat	Date	Member	Party	Reason	Date	Member	Party
Halifax	August 31, 2024	Andy Fillmore	█ Liberal	Resigned to run for the mayoralty of Halifax, Nova Scotia	April 14, 2025 (cancelled)		█ Vacant

== Predictions ==
Polling firm	Last date of polling	Link	LPC	CPC	NDP	GPC	PPC	Others	Margin of error (Note: In cases when linked poll details distinguish between the margin of error associated with the total sample of respondents (including undecided and non-voters) and that of the subsample of decided/leaning voters, the former is included in the table. Also not included is the margin of error created by rounding to the nearest whole number or any margin of error from methodological sources. Most online polls (because of their opt-in method of recruiting panelists which results in a non-random sample) cannot have a margin of error. In such cases, shown is what the margin of error would be for a survey using a random probability-based sample of equivalent size.)	Sample size (Note: Refers to the total, "raw" sample size, including undecided and non-voters, and before demographic weighting is applied. Fractions in parentheses apply to rolling polls (see below) and indicate the proportion of the sample that is independent from the previous poll in the series.)	Polling method (Note: "Telephone" refers to traditional telephone polls conducted by live interviewers; "IVR" refers to automated Interactive Voice Response polls conducted by telephone; "online" refers to polls conducted exclusively over the internet; "telephone/online" refers to polls which combine results from both telephone and online surveys, or for which respondents are initially recruited by telephone and then asked to complete an online survey. "Rolling" polls contain overlapping data from one poll to the next.)	Lead
Abacus Data	March 20, 2025		46	37	12	3	2	1	± 4.1 pp	600	Online	9
Cardinal Research	November 15, 2024		40	37	17	3	1	—N/a	± 3.5 pp	1046	Telephone	3
Narrative Research	August 18, 2024		30	43	21	4	2	0	± 2.6 pp	400	Telephone	13

== Results ==
=== Summary ===
Nova Scotian summary seat results in the 2025 Canadian federal election
Party	Votes	Vote %	Vote +/-	Seats	Seat +/-
Liberal	330,556	57.2%	▲14.9pp	10 / 11 (91%)	▲3
Conservative	203,290	35.2%	▲5.8pp	1 / 11 (9%)	▼2
New Democratic	30,129	5.2%	▼16.9pp	0 / 11 (0%)	0
Green	5,442	0.9%	▼1.0pp	0 / 11 (0%)	0
People's	5,126	0.9%	▼3.1pp	0 / 11 (0%)	0
Independents and minor parties	3,197	0.6%	▲0.3pp	0 / 11 (0%)	0
Total	577,740	100%	–	11 / 11 (100%)	▲1 (Note: 1 seat was vacant at the dissolution of Parliament.)

=== Comparison with national results ===
Results by party
Party	Popular vote %			Seats in caucus
Party	NS	Natl.	diff.	Seats in caucus
Liberal	57.2	43.7	+13.5	10 / 169 (6%)
Conservative	35.2	41.3	-6.1	1 / 144 (0.7%)
New Democratic	5.2	6.3	-1.1	0 / 7 (0%)
Green	0.9	1.2	-0.3	0 / 1 (0%)
People's	0.9	0.7	+0.2	no caucus
Total	–	–	–	11 / 343 (3%)

== Student vote results ==
Student votes are mock elections that run parallel to actual elections, in which students not of voting age participate. They are administered by Student Vote Canada. These are for educational purposes and do not count towards the results.

Summary of the 2025 Canadian Student Vote in Nova Scotia
Party	Leader	Seats			Popular vote		
Party	Leader	Elected	%	Δ	Votes	%	Δ (pp)
Liberal	Mark Carney	8	72.73	▲4	11,460	39.99	▲11.88
Conservative	Pierre Poilievre	3	27.27	▲1	8,611	30.05	▲9.85
New Democratic	Jagmeet Singh	0	0	▼5	3,694	12.89	▼18.67
Green	Elizabeth May & Jonathan Pedneault	0	0	0	2,657	9.27	▼1.65
People's	Maxime Bernier	0	0	0	1,638	5.72	▼0.87
Other		0	0	0	597	2.08	▼0.54
Total		11	100.00	0	28,657	100.00	–
Source: Student Vote Canada

== Aftermath ==
Several months following the election, Chris d'Entremont, the Conservative MP for Acadie—Annapolis, crossed the floor to the Liberal Party. This meant that Nova Scotia's entire delegation to the House of Commons were members of the Liberal Party.

== See also ==
- Canadian federal election results in Nova Scotia
