= 2025 Canadian federal election in Saskatchewan =

- April 28, 2025

All 14 Saskatchewanian seats in the House of Commons
- Registered: 825,621
- Turnout: 560,766 (67.92%)
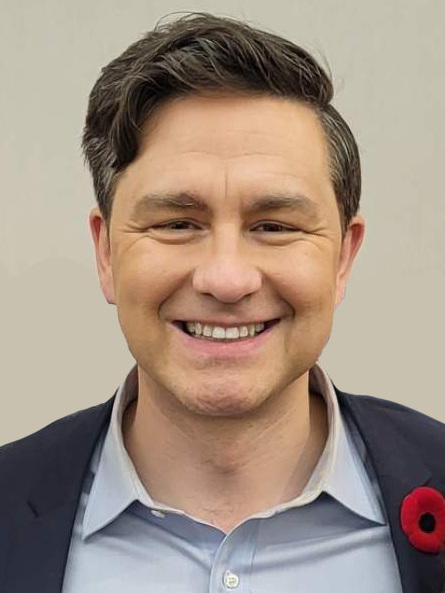

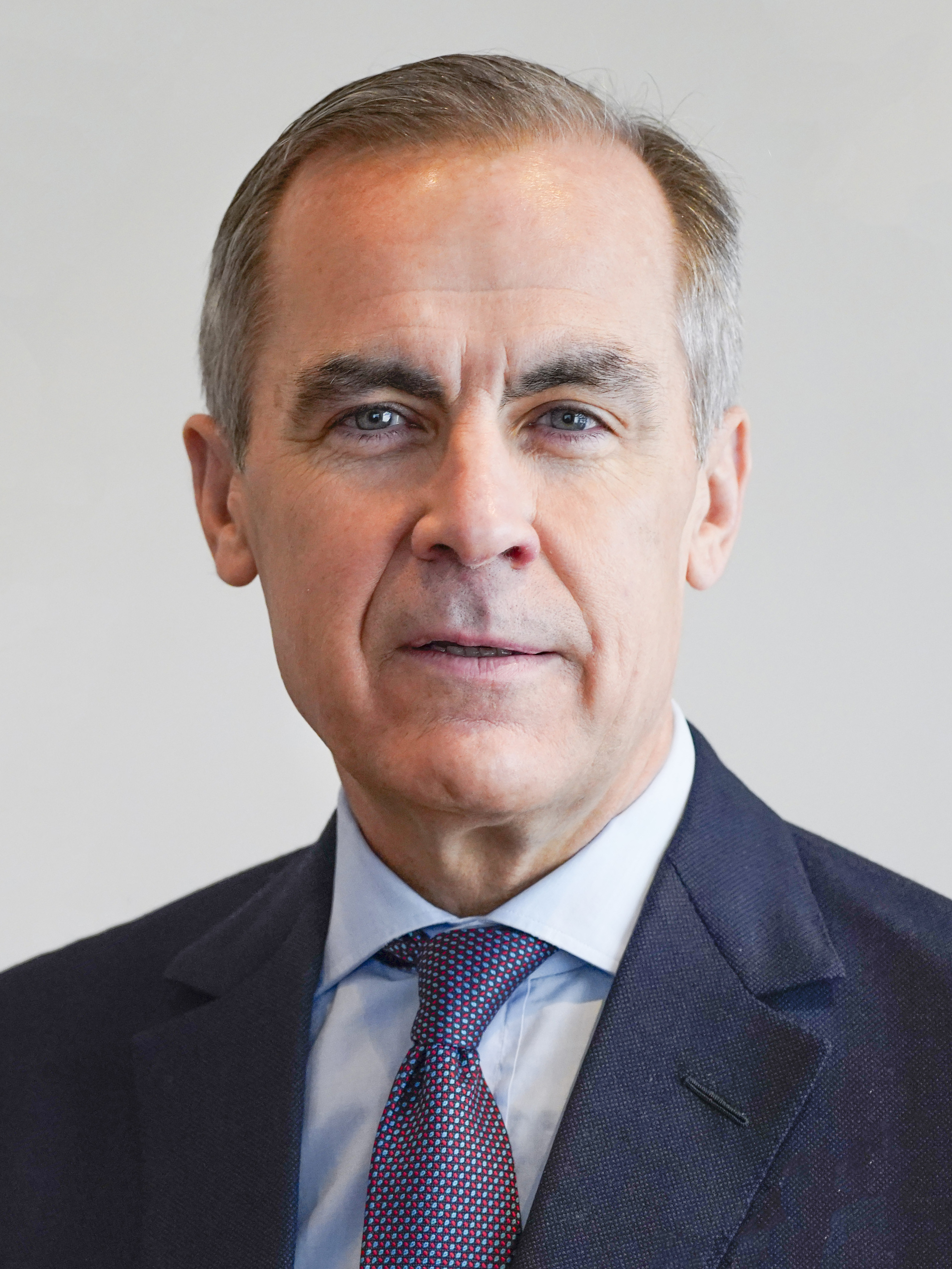

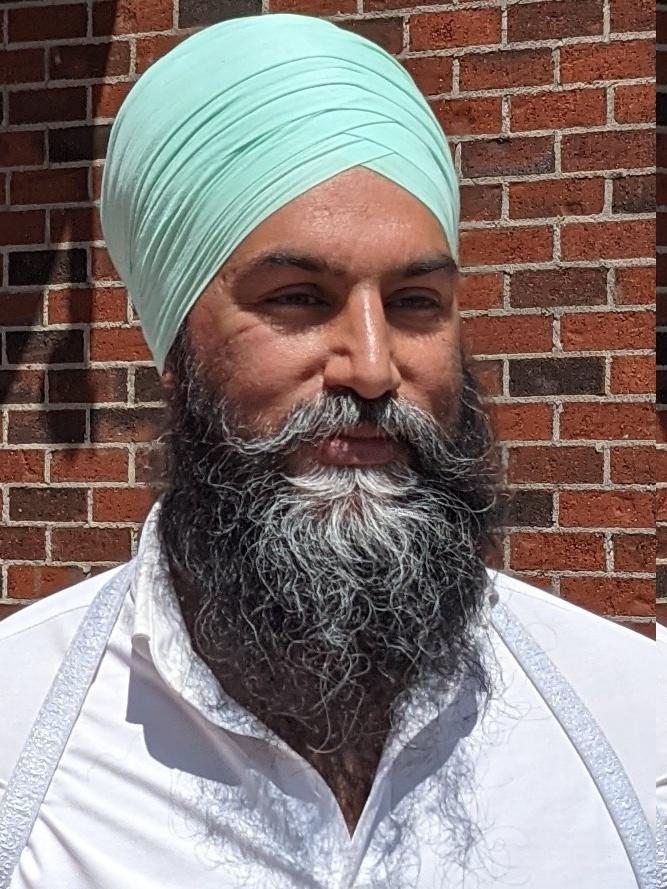
	First party	Second party	Third party
Leader	Pierre Poilievre	Mark Carney	Jagmeet Singh
Party	Conservative	Liberal	New Democratic
Leader since	September 10, 2022	March 9, 2025	October 1, 2017
Last election	14 seats, 59.0%	0 seats, 10.6%	0 seats, 21.1%
Seats before	14	0	0
Seats won	13	1	0
Seat change	▼1	▲1	0
Popular vote	362,049	148,920	42,310
Percentage	64.6%	26.6%	7.6%
Swing	▲5.6%	▲16.0%	▼13.5%
Prime minister before election
Mark Carney
Liberal
Prime minister after election
Mark Carney
Liberal

In the 2025 Canadian federal election, 14 members of Parliament were elected to the House of Commons from the province of Saskatchewan (4.1% of all members).

== 2022 electoral redistribution ==
The 2025 Canadian federal election was the first election to utilize the electoral districts established following the 2022 Canadian federal electoral redistribution. The House of Commons increased from 338 seats to 343 seats. Saskatchewan's seat allocation stayed the same at 14 seats. This ensures that the average population per constituency in Saskatchewan is 80,893 (according to the 2021 Canadian census), which is 26,955 less people per electoral district than the national average.

2021 results transposed onto 2023 boundaries
Party	MPs		
Party	2021 actual result	2021 notional result	Change
Conservative	14	13	▼1
Liberal	0	1	▲1
New Democratic	0	0	0
Total seats	14	14	0

== Predictions ==
Polling firm	Last date of polling	Link	LPC	CPC	NDP	GPC	PPC	Others	Margin of error (Note: In cases when linked poll details distinguish between the margin of error associated with the total sample of respondents (including undecided and non-voters) and that of the subsample of decided/leaning voters, the former is included in the table. Also not included is the margin of error created by rounding to the nearest whole number or any margin of error from methodological sources. Most online polls (because of their opt-in method of recruiting panelists which results in a non-random sample) cannot have a margin of error. In such cases, shown is what the margin of error would be for a survey using a random probability-based sample of equivalent size.)	Sample size (Note: Refers to the total, "raw" sample size, including undecided and non-voters, and before demographic weighting is applied. Fractions in parentheses apply to rolling polls (see below) and indicate the proportion of the sample that is independent from the previous poll in the series.)	Polling method (Note: "Telephone" refers to traditional telephone polls conducted by live interviewers; "IVR" refers to automated Interactive Voice Response polls conducted by telephone; "online" refers to polls conducted exclusively over the internet; "telephone/online" refers to polls which combine results from both telephone and online surveys, or for which respondents are initially recruited by telephone and then asked to complete an online survey. "Rolling" polls contain overlapping data from one poll to the next.)	Lead
Rubicon Strategy	April 10, 2025		25	38	11	2.5	2.5	—N/a	± 4 pp	747	Online	13

== Results ==
=== Summary ===
Saskatchewanian summary seat results in the 2025 Canadian federal election
Party	Votes	Vote %	Vote +/-	Seats	Seat +/-
Conservative	362,049	64.6%	▲5.6pp	13 / 14 (93%)	▼1
Liberal	148,920	26.6%	▲16.0pp	1 / 14 (7%)	▲1
New Democratic	42,310	7.6%	▼13.5pp	0 / 14 (0%)	0
Green	3,092	0.6%	▼0.5pp	0 / 14 (0%)	0
People's	2,999	0.5%	▼6.1pp	0 / 14 (0%)	0
Independents and minor parties	1,396	0.2%	▼1.4pp	0 / 14 (0%)	0
Total	560,766	100%	–	14 / 14 (100%)	0

=== Comparison with national results ===
Results by party
Party	Popular vote %			Seats in caucus
Party	SK	Natl.	diff.	Seats in caucus
Conservative	64.6	41.3	+23.3	13 / 144 (9%)
Liberal	26.6	43.7	-17.1	1 / 169 (0.6%)
New Democratic	7.6	6.3	+1.3	0 / 7 (0%)
Green	0.6	1.2	-0.6	0 / 1 (0%)
People's	0.5	0.7	-0.2	no caucus
Total	–	–	–	14 / 343 (4%)

== Student vote results ==
Student votes are mock elections that run parallel to actual elections, in which students not of voting age participate. They are administered by Student Vote Canada. These are for educational purposes and do not count towards the results.

Summary of the 2025 Canadian Student Vote in Saskatchewan
Party	Leader	Seats			Popular vote		
Party	Leader	Elected	%	Δ	Votes	%	Δ (pp)
Conservative	Pierre Poilievre	13	92.86	▲3	12,836	48.15	▲9.41
Liberal	Mark Carney	1	7.14	▲1	5,846	21.93	▲9.87
New Democratic	Jagmeet Singh	0	0	▼4	4,432	16.62	▼12.46
Green	Elizabeth May & Jonathan Pedneault	0	0	0	2,097	7.87	▼2.17
People's	Maxime Bernier	0	0	0	874	3.28	▼4.16
Other		0	0	0	574	2.15	▼0.48
Total		14	100.00	0	26,659	100.00	–
Source: Student Vote Canada

== See also ==
- 2024 Saskatchewan general election
