= 2025 Canadian federal election =

- April 28, 2025

343 seats in the House of Commons 172 seats needed for a majority
- Opinion polls
- Registered: 28,525,638
- Turnout: 69.5% (▲7.2 pp); 19,597,674
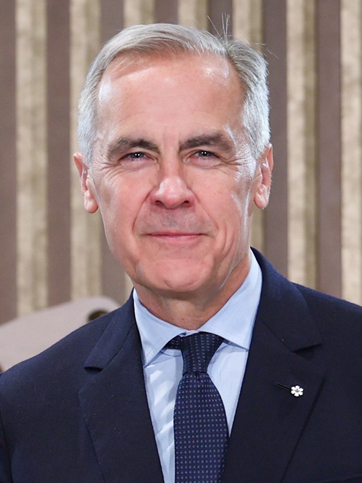

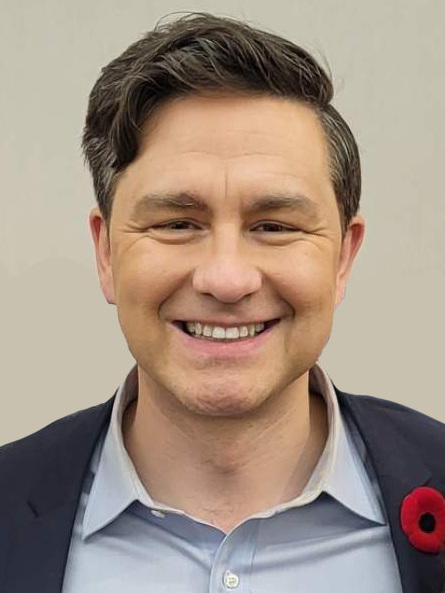

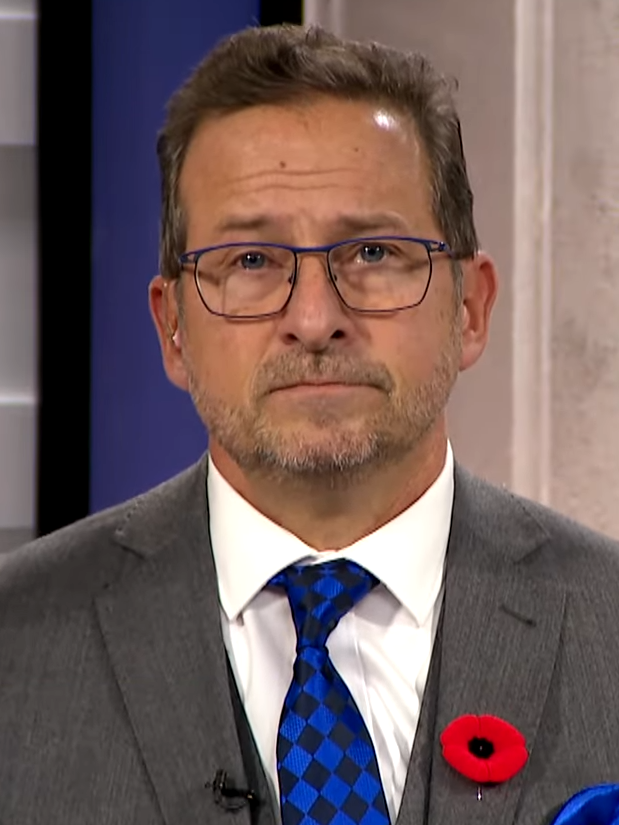

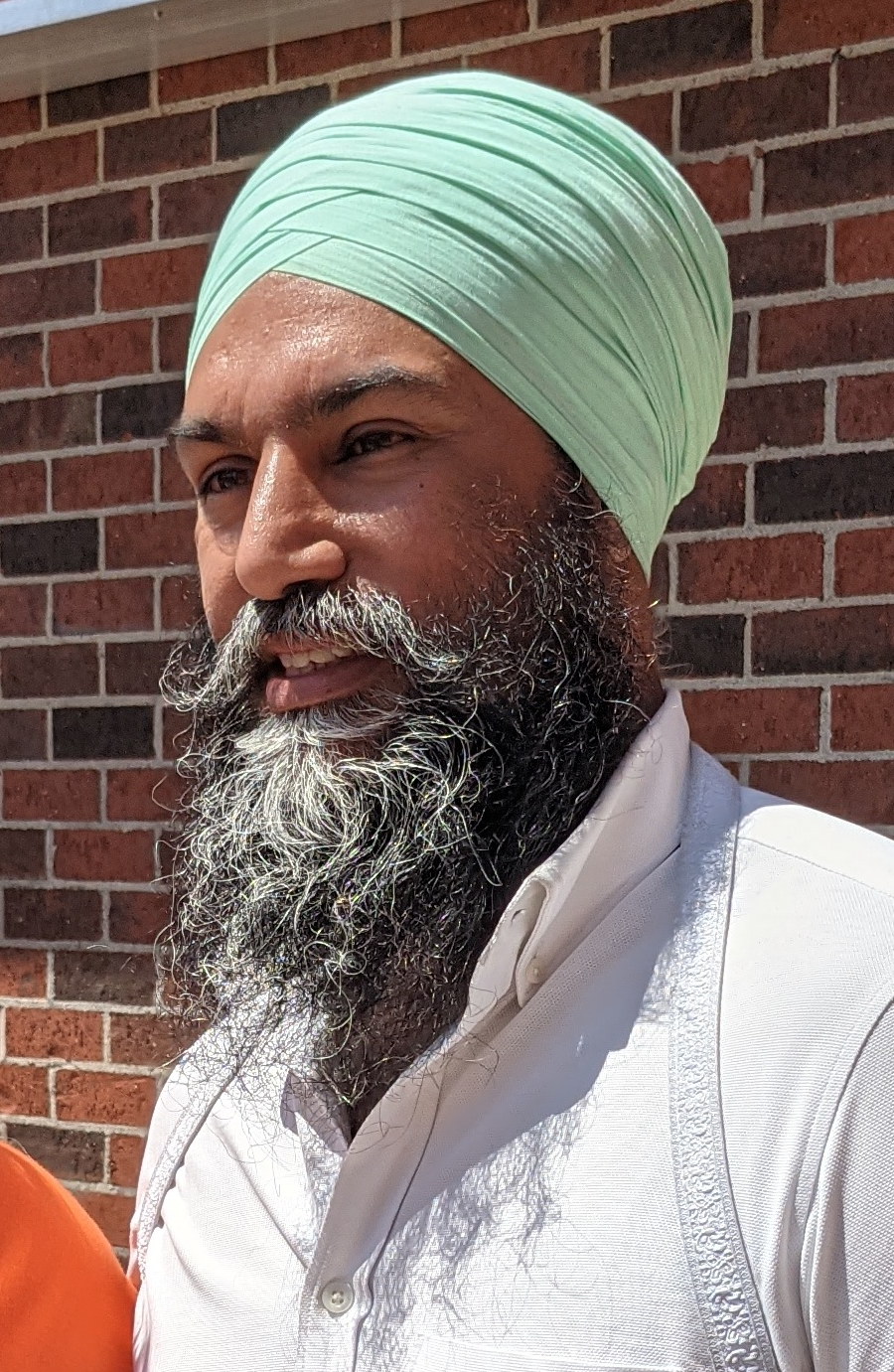

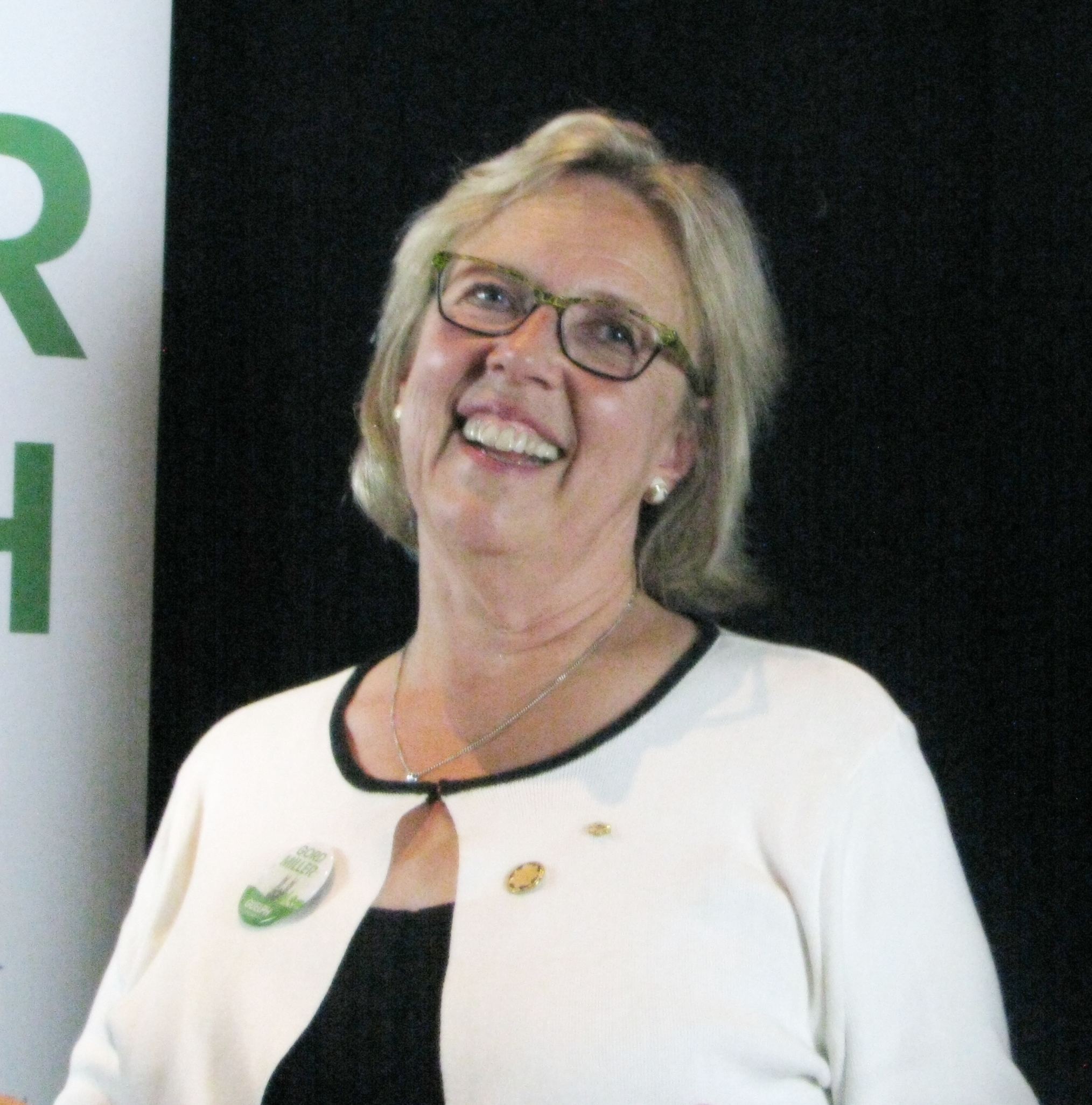

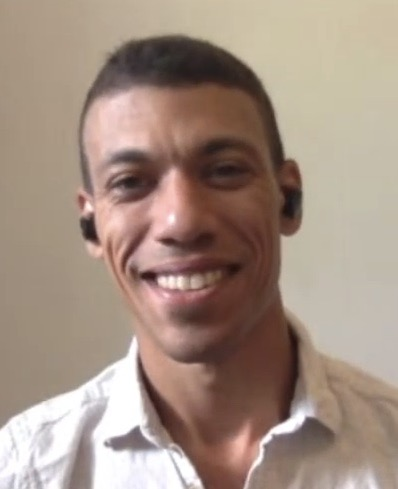
	First party	Second party	Third party
Leader	Mark Carney	Pierre Poilievre	Yves-François Blanchet
Party	Liberal	Conservative	Bloc Québécois
Leader since	March 9, 2025	September 10, 2022	January 17, 2019
Leader's seat	Nepean (Note: Not the incumbent but stood for this seat and won)	Carleton (lost re-election)	Belœil—Chambly
Last election	160 seats, 32.62%	119 seats, 33.74%	32 seats, 7.64%
Seats before	152	120	33
Seats won	169 (Note: The Supreme Court of Canada overturned the results in Terrebonne in February 2026, with the 2026 Terrebonne federal by-election being called.)	144	22
Seat change	▲17	▲24	▼11
Popular vote	8,595,488	8,113,484	1,236,349
Percentage	43.76%	41.31%	6.29%
Swing	▲11.14 pp	▲7.57 pp	▼1.35 pp
	Fourth party	Fifth party
Leader	Jagmeet Singh	Elizabeth May & Jonathan Pedneault
Party	New Democratic	Green
Leader since	October 1, 2017	November 19, 2022 / February 4, 2025
Leader's seat	Burnaby Central (Note: Burnaby South, which Singh represented before the election, was abolished during the 2022 Canadian federal electoral redistribution; Singh ran for re-election in the new riding of Burnaby Central, which encompasses much of the same territory.) (lost re-election)	Saanich—Gulf Islands / Ran in Outremont (lost)
Last election	25 seats, 17.82%	2 seats, 2.33%
Seats before	24	2
Seats won	7	1
Seat change	▼17	▼1
Popular vote	1,234,673	238,892
Percentage	6.29%	1.22%
Swing	▼11.53 pp	▼1.11 pp
Prime Minister before election
Mark Carney
Liberal
Prime Minister after election
Mark Carney
Liberal

The 2025 Canadian federal election was held on April 28, 2025, to elect members to the House of Commons of the 45th Canadian Parliament. Governor General Mary Simon dropped the writs of election on March 23, 2025, after Prime Minister Mark Carney advised her to dissolve Parliament. This was the first election to use a new 343-seat electoral map based on the 2021 census. Key issues of the election campaign included the cost of living, housing, crime, U.S. tariffs against Canadian exports, and threats of annexation made by U.S. president Donald Trump.

The Liberal Party won a fourth term, emerging with a minority government for a third consecutive election. The election marked the first time they won the popular vote since 2015, doing so with the highest vote share for any party in a federal election since 1984, and their own highest vote share since 1980. The party's victory came after a substantial rebound in the polls, noted as being "one of the widest on record in any democracy". The election also saw the highest turnout since 1993, with 69.5% of Canada's 28 million eligible voters casting a ballot.

Both the Liberal Party and the Conservative Party improved upon their vote share and seat count from 2021, while the other parties all lost ground; this was the most concentrated the popular vote had been in support of the top two parties since 1958, with over 85% voting Liberal or Conservative. Consequently, the election delivered the New Democratic Party (NDP) their worst result in its history, as it received just over six percent of the popular vote and only won seven seats. As a result, the NDP lost official party status for the first time since 1993. The concentration of support for the two major parties was identified by commentators as marking a polarization in Canadian politics and a shift towards a two-party system.

The result was a reversal of polling trends lasting from mid-2023 to January 2025, which had led to projections of the Conservatives winning in a landslide. Carney's replacement of Justin Trudeau as leader of the Liberal Party played a key role in the turnaround. With his extensive experience as a central banker and his perceived competence, Carney was seen as better equipped to handle the trade war launched by the U.S. and other major economic issues. Two sitting party leaders failed to win re-election to their parliamentary seats: Pierre Poilievre of the Conservative Party and Jagmeet Singh of the NDP. Poilievre had held his riding of Carleton since 2004, and his defeat was regarded as a significant setback for the Conservatives; he was the first Conservative leader to lose their seat since Kim Campbell in 1993.

== Background ==
The 2021 Canadian federal election, held on September 20, 2021, saw only minor changes from the preceding 2019 election. The incumbent Liberal Party, led by Prime Minister Justin Trudeau, did not win the popular vote and failed to win enough seats to gain a parliamentary majority, winning only a plurality of seats and retaining its status as a minority government. The Conservative Party won the popular vote and continued as the Official Opposition. (Note: While formal results showed the Liberals winning 160 seats, those totals include Kevin Vuong, who was disavowed during the campaign by his party, and sat as an independent in the House of Commons from 2021 to 2025.) In March 2022, the Liberals struck a deal with the fourth-place New Democratic Party (NDP), where the latter would provide confidence and supply for the duration of the Parliament in exchange for certain policy concessions. The agreement lasted until September 2024, when the NDP terminated the deal.

One week after the 2021 election, on September 27, Annamie Paul resigned as the Green Party leader, citing lack of party support. The subsequent leadership election was won by former leader Elizabeth May, who ran on a "joint ticket" with Jonathan Pedneault, proposing a co-leadership model; Pedneault was officially named the deputy leader, pending a change to the party's constitution to allow co-leadership. May and Pedneault formally became co-leaders on February 4, 2025.

On February 2, 2022, Conservative leader Erin O'Toole was removed as leader by a caucus vote. Following a leadership election, Pierre Poilievre was elected the new leader of the Conservative Party.

Because of the decennial redrawing of riding boundaries, many MPs were running in districts that had changed.

=== Government transition ===
Despite low government approval ratings and a large polling lead for the opposition Conservatives – linked to an ongoing cost of living crisis – Trudeau had insisted he would lead the Liberals into the next general election, and attempt to win a fourth consecutive term. Despite his commitment to seek re-election, pressure on Trudeau to step aside had been mounting from the Liberal caucus after by-election losses in safe Liberal seats.

On December 16, 2024, the government was plunged into a political crisis when finance minister Chrystia Freeland abruptly resigned, only hours before she was set to present the government's fall economic statement. The resignation was seen as a clear rebuke of the prime minister from one of his most loyal allies, and sent shockwaves throughout Canadian politics. Trudeau, who had already faced down a caucus revolt in October, was faced with renewed questions about his leadership. By December 22, 21 Liberal MPs had publicly called for Trudeau to step down. On January 6, 2025, Trudeau announced his intention to resign as prime minister after the party elected his successor. The ensuing leadership election was won by Mark Carney, former governor of the Bank of Canada and governor of the Bank of England. Carney was sworn in as prime minister on March 14, becoming the first prime minister to have never held elected public office prior to their appointment.

The crisis occurred against the backdrop of Donald Trump's victory in the 2024 United States presidential election and his threats to impose sweeping tariffs on Canada. Disagreements over how to handle this threat were seen as being a contributor to the Trudeau ministry's collapse. However, the Trump administration's conduct soon sparked a political revival for the Liberals, with the ensuing trade war, along with Trump's threats to annex Canada, greatly reducing the Liberals' polling gap with the Conservatives. By the time Carney was sworn in as prime minister, the polling gap had been eliminated altogether and the Liberals were in the lead, putting them in striking distance of a majority government. The scale of their political turnaround was described by analysts as having "little precedent" in Canadian history.

=== Date of the election ===
Under the fixed-date provisions of the Canada Elections Act, which requires federal elections to be held on the third Monday in October in the fourth calendar year after the polling day of the previous election, the election was scheduled to take place on October 20, 2025. However, elections can occur before the scheduled date if the governor general dissolves Parliament on the recommendation of the prime minister, either for a snap election or after the government loses a vote on a supply bill or a specific motion of no confidence.

On March 20, 2024, the government introduced the Electoral Participation Act, which included an amendment to the Canada Elections Act that would have changed the fixed election date to October 27, 2025, to avoid conflicting with Diwali, as well as municipal elections in Alberta. The bill died on the order paper when the Parliament of Canada was prorogued by Prime Minister Justin Trudeau after he announced his resignation.

On March 23, 2025, after a request from Prime Minister Mark Carney, the governor general dissolved parliament and called an election for April 28, 2025. The date fixed for the return of the writs by the Chief Electoral Officer was May 19, 2025.

=== Political parties and standings ===
The table below lists parties represented in the House of Commons after the 2021 federal election and their current standings. Kevin Vuong, despite being elected as a Liberal, was disavowed by the party too late to alter his affiliation on the ballot and served out his term as an independent.

Name	Ideology	Position	Leader(s)	2021 result		Standing before election
Name	Ideology	Position	Leader(s)	Votes (%)	Seats	Standing before election
Liberal	Liberalism; Social liberalism	Centre to centre-left	Mark Carney	32.62%	160 / 338	152 / 338
Conservative	Conservatism; Economic liberalism	Centre-right to right-wing	Pierre Poilievre	33.74%	119 / 338	120 / 338
Bloc Québécois	Quebec nationalism Quebec sovereigntism Social democracy	Centre-left	Yves-François Blanchet	7.64%	32 / 338	33 / 338
New Democratic	Social democracy	Centre-left to left-wing	Jagmeet Singh	17.82%	25 / 338	24 / 338
Green	Green politics		Elizabeth May & Jonathan Pedneault	2.33%	2 / 338	2 / 338
Independents	N/A			0.19%	0 / 338	3 / 338
Vacant	N/A					4 / 338

=== Electoral system ===
Canada's electoral system, a "first-past-the-post" system, is formally referred to as a single-member plurality system. Voters select a representative nominated for their electoral district (sometimes referred to as a riding), and the candidate with more votes than any other candidate is elected to a seat in the 343-member House of Commons and represents that riding as its member of parliament (MP). The party that wins the most seats in the House of Commons usually forms government, with that party's leader becoming prime minister. The largest party by seat count that is not the government or part of a governing coalition becomes the Official Opposition. That party receives more finances and privileges than the other opposition parties.

An absolute majority of the votes cast is not needed to form government and is rarely achieved by any single party. Additionally, the government party does not need to obtain a majority of the seats in the House of Commons; under the current multi-party system, it is common for the government party to lack a majority. However, to pass bills, the governing party must have support of a majority of MPs. Without majority support, the government can be defeated, then a new party is named government or an election has to be held.

==== Redistribution ====
The transposed results of the 2021 election, if they had taken place under the 2023 Representation Order ( Interactive map version, with notional results shown in clickable points)

This was the first election contested under the new electoral districts established in the 2022 redistribution. Consequently, media outlets tend to report seat gains and losses as compared to notional results. These are the results if all votes cast in 2021 were unchanged but regrouped by new electoral district boundaries, as published by Elections Canada.

2021 results transposed onto 2023 boundaries
Party	MPs		
Party	2021 actual result	2021 notional result	Change
Liberal	160	157	▼3
Conservative	119	126	▲7
Bloc Québécois	32	34	▲2
New Democratic	25	24	▼1
Green	2	2	Steady
Total seats	338	343	5 ▲

=== Incumbents not standing for re-election ===
Party	MPs retiring	
Party	2021 election (Note: Party affiliation of retiring MPs at the time of the 2021 federal election)	At dissolution
Liberal	40	38
Conservative	13	12
New Democratic	4	4
Bloc Québécois	4	4
Independent	0	3
Total	60	60

Sixty MPs announced that they would not run in the 2025 federal election. One MP lost their party nomination race to run again. One MP had their candidacy revoked by their party and was barred from running under its banner. Four MPs announced their intention not to stand again but later resigned from Parliament before the election. Five further MPs initially announced their intention to stand down before later changing their minds.

== Timeline ==
Changes in seats held (2021–2025)
Seat	Before			Change			
Seat	Date	Member	Party	Reason	Date	Member	Party
Spadina—Fort York	November 22, 2021	Kevin Vuong	█ Liberal	Excluded from caucus			█ Independent
Mississauga—Lakeshore	May 27, 2022	Sven Spengemann	█ Liberal	Resigned to accept a position with the United Nations	December 12, 2022	Charles Sousa	█ Liberal
Richmond—Arthabaska	September 13, 2022	Alain Rayes	█ Conservative	Left caucus			█ Independent
Winnipeg South Centre	December 12, 2022	Jim Carr	█ Liberal	Died in office	June 19, 2023	Ben Carr	█ Liberal
Calgary Heritage	December 31, 2022	Bob Benzen	█ Conservative	Resigned to return to the private sector	July 24, 2023	Shuvaloy Majumdar	█ Conservative
Oxford	January 28, 2023	Dave MacKenzie	█ Conservative	Retired	June 19, 2023	Arpan Khanna	█ Conservative
Portage—Lisgar	February 28, 2023	Candice Bergen	█ Conservative	Resigned	June 19, 2023	Branden Leslie	█ Conservative
Notre-Dame-de-Grâce—Westmount	March 8, 2023	Marc Garneau	█ Liberal	Retired	June 19, 2023	Anna Gainey	█ Liberal
Don Valley North	March 22, 2023	Han Dong	█ Liberal	Left caucus			█ Independent
Durham	August 1, 2023	Erin O'Toole	█ Conservative	Resigned	March 4, 2024	Jamil Jivani	█ Conservative
Toronto—St. Paul's	January 16, 2024	Carolyn Bennett	█ Liberal	Resigned to become ambassador of Canada to Denmark	June 24, 2024	Don Stewart	█ Conservative
LaSalle—Émard—Verdun	February 1, 2024	David Lametti	█ Liberal	Resigned to join law firm	September 16, 2024	Louis-Philippe Sauvé	█ Bloc Québécois
Elmwood—Transcona	March 31, 2024	Daniel Blaikie	█ New Democratic	Resigned to work with Premier of Manitoba Wab Kinew	September 16, 2024	Leila Dance	█ New Democratic
Cloverdale—Langley City	May 27, 2024	John Aldag	█ Liberal	Resigned to run as the BC NDP candidate for Langley-Abbotsford in the 2024 BC general election	December 16, 2024	Tamara Jansen	█ Conservative
Halifax	August 31, 2024	Andy Fillmore	█ Liberal	Resigned to run for the mayoralty of Halifax, Nova Scotia	April 14, 2025 (cancelled)		█ Vacant
Honoré-Mercier	September 19, 2024	Pablo Rodriguez	█ Liberal	Left caucus			█ Independent
Honoré-Mercier	January 20, 2025	Pablo Rodriguez	█ Independent	Resigned to run for the leadership of the Quebec Liberal Party	Vacant until the 2025 election		█ Vacant
Esquimalt—Saanich—Sooke	January 30, 2025	Randall Garrison	█ New Democratic	Resigned	Vacant until the 2025 election		█ Vacant
Eglinton—Lawrence	March 14, 2025	Marco Mendicino	█ Liberal	Resigned to become Chief of Staff to the Prime Minister	Vacant until the 2025 election		█ Vacant

=== 2021 ===
- September 27 – Annamie Paul announced her intent to resign as leader of the Green Party.
- November 10 – Paul formally submitted her resignation and ended her membership in the party. The Green Party accepted her resignation a few days later.
- November 15 – Senator Denise Batters launched a petition to review the leadership of Erin O'Toole. Party president Robert Batherson decided the petition was not in order. The following day, Batters was removed from the Conservative caucus.
- November 24 – Amita Kuttner was appointed as Green Party interim leader.
- December 5 – The People's Party concluded its leadership review of Maxime Bernier. He was confirmed and continued as leader.

=== 2022 ===
- February 2 – Erin O'Toole was removed as the leader of the Conservative Party by a caucus vote. Candice Bergen was selected by the party caucus to serve as interim leader.
- March 22 – The Liberal and New Democratic parties reached a confidence and supply agreement, with the NDP agreeing to support the Liberal government until June 2025 in exchange for specific policy commitments.
- September 10 – The 2022 Conservative Party of Canada leadership election concluded with Pierre Poilievre being announced as the new leader of the Conservatives.
- November 19 – The 2022 Green Party of Canada leadership election concluded with Elizabeth May and Jonathan Pedneault announced as winners on a "joint ticket". May became leader and Pedneault deputy leader of the party, pending a change to the party's constitution to allow co-leadership.

=== 2023 ===
- July 26 – Prime Minister Justin Trudeau conducted a major cabinet reshuffle.
- September 26 – Anthony Rota announced his intention to resign as Speaker of the House of Commons. Louis Plamondon was nominated to replace Rota on an interim basis.
- October 3 – Liberal MP Greg Fergus was elected speaker of the House of Commons. He was the first person of colour to be elected speaker.

=== 2024 ===
- September 4 – The NDP officially ended their confidence and supply agreement with the Liberals.
- November 20 – Liberal MP Randy Boissonnault resigned from Cabinet following allegations that he ran a business seeking federal contracts and falsely claimed to be Indigenous.
- December 9 – Trudeau's Liberal government survived a third motion of no confidence, with the Conservatives and Bloc Québécois voting for the motion, and the Liberals, NDP, and Greens opposed.
- December 16 – Chrystia Freeland, the incumbent deputy prime minister and minister of finance, resigned from her position in Justin Trudeau's government prior to the release later that day of the government's fall economic statement due to her opposition to Trudeau's fiscal policy; later that day, she was replaced as minister of finance by Dominic LeBlanc, while the position of deputy prime minister remained vacant. Housing minister Sean Fraser also resigned from cabinet the same morning, citing personal reasons.
- December 20 – Trudeau conducted a major cabinet reshuffle. The NDP officially committed to introducing a non-confidence motion against the government. Over 20 Liberal MPs publicly called for Trudeau to resign and over 50 signed a private letter asking him to resign.

=== 2025 ===
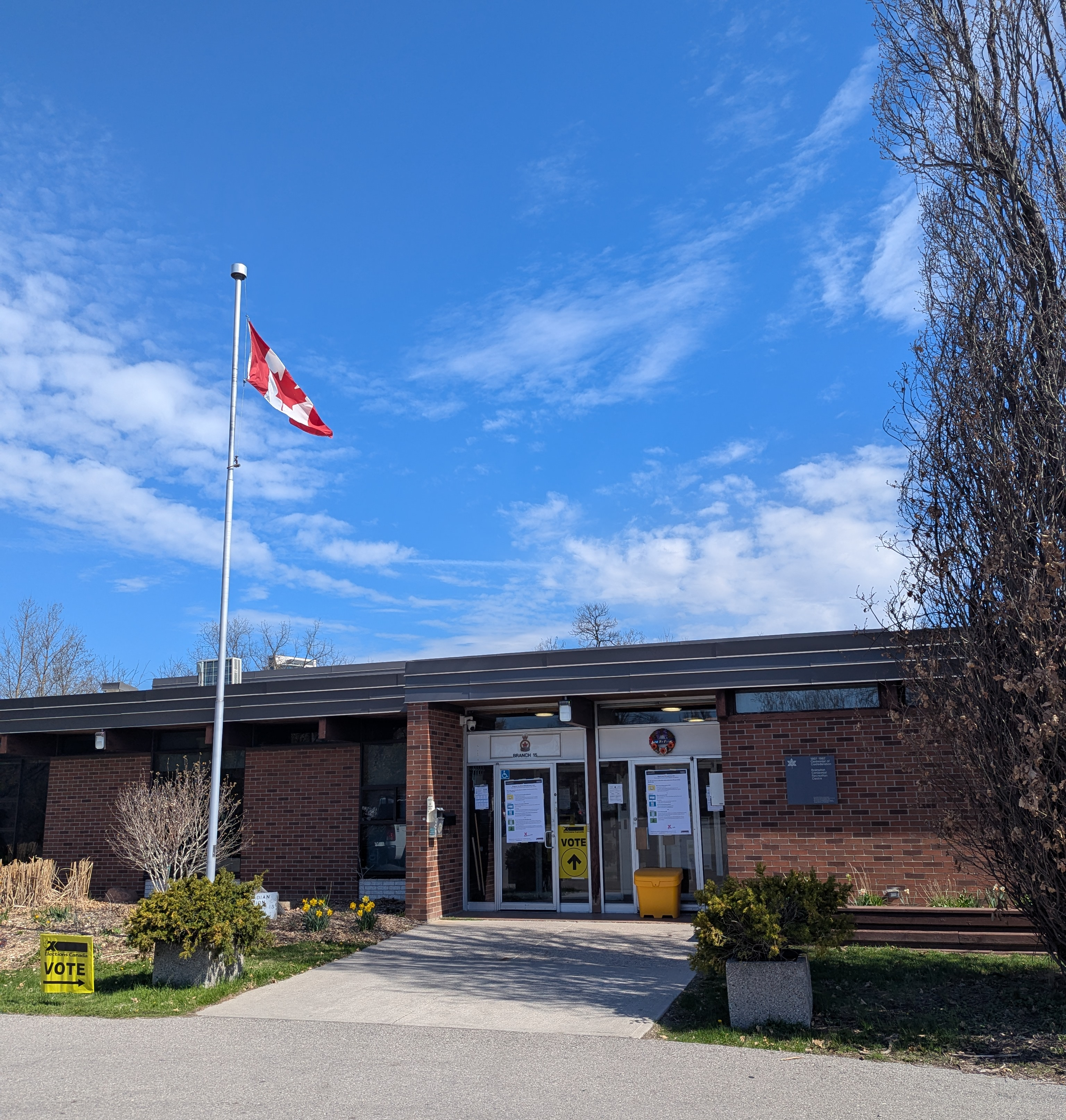
Election day voting location at a Royal Canadian Legion branch in Brampton, Ontario

- January 6 – Trudeau announced the prorogation of parliament until March 24 in addition to his resignation as prime minister and as leader of the Liberal Party, effective upon the election of his successor as party leader in a leadership election.
- January 15 – Trudeau announced that he will not run in Papineau again.
- February 4 – The Green Party of Canada concluded its co-leadership vote, with Elizabeth May and Jonathan Pedneault re-elected as co-leaders.
- February 13 – People's Party of Canada leader Maxime Bernier announced he will run in Beauce again.
- March 3 – Green Party of Canada co-leader Jonathan Pedneault announced he will run in Outremont.
- March 9 – The 2025 Liberal Party of Canada leadership election concluded with Mark Carney being announced as the new leader of the Liberal Party of Canada.
- March 14 – Carney was sworn in as the 24th prime minister of Canada, and appointed a new Cabinet, beginning the 30th Canadian Ministry.
- March 20 – Liberal MP Chandra Arya's nomination in Nepean was revoked, allegedly due to foreign interference concerns. He had previously been disqualified as a Liberal leadership candidate.
- March 22 – Carney announced that he will run in Nepean.
- March 23 – Carney advised the governor general to dissolve parliament and call a general election for April 28, 2025.
- April 7 and 9 – Deadline for candidate nominations; final list of candidates published.
- April 16 and 17 – French and English language leaders' debates hosted by the Leaders' Debates Commission took place in Montreal.
- April 18 to 21 – Advance polling took place. According to an Elections Canada estimate released on April 22, 7.3 million electors participated in advance polls.
- April 22 – Last day to vote at an Elections Canada office or to apply to vote by mail.
- April 28 – Election day.

== Campaign ==
=== Contests ===
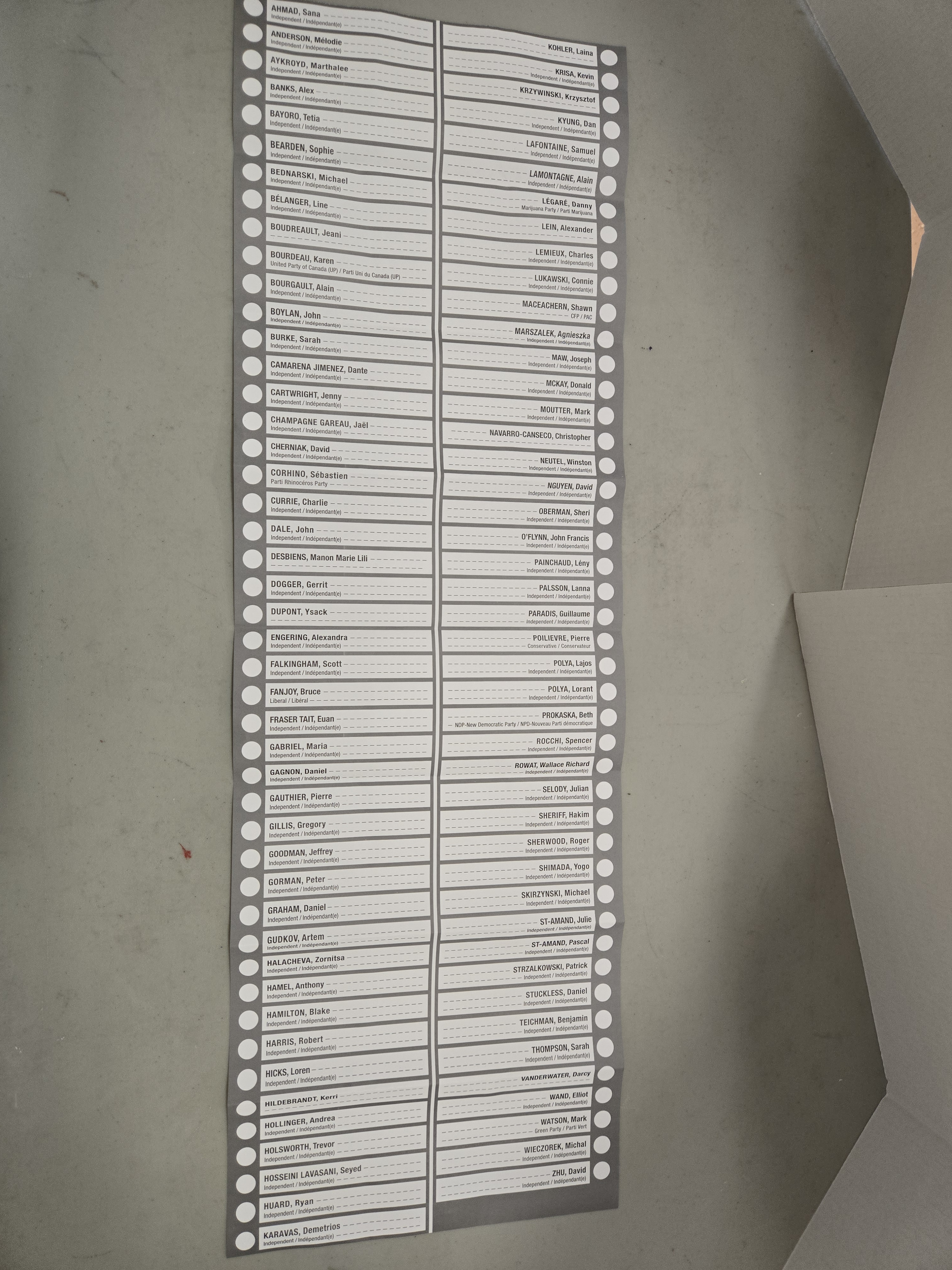
Ballot for the 2025 Canadian federal election (Carleton)

When nominations were closed on April 7, Elections Canada announced that 1,959 candidates would be running for election. No party fielded full slates of candidates in all 343 ridings, though the Bloc Québécois, which only runs candidates in Quebec, covered all 78 Quebec constituencies. The Liberals, Conservatives and NDP were all one short, respectively in Ponoka—Didsbury, Québec Centre and South Shore—St. Margarets. In Ponoka—Didsbury, Zarnab Zafar was not identified as a Liberal allegedly because of "a clerical error with Elections Canada" and is under no affiliation, but the Liberals endorsed her. In Québec Centre, there was said to be "an issue with paperwork" causing the Conservative candidate's nomination to be rejected after the deadline for candidate registrations. The Quebec lieutenant for the Conservative Party of Canada (Pierre Paul-Hus) and the party defended her, contesting the decision and blaming Elections Canada for bureaucratic errors. Chanie Thériault described the invalidation as a "democratic injustice" and accused the agency of "failing democracy". The NDP candidate in South Shore—St. Margarets withdrew for personal reasons, and an independent candidate in the riding was endorsed by the NDP afterward.

The Longest Ballot Committee targeted Poilievre's Carleton riding, which had 83 independents nominated, therefore there were a total of 91 candidates running in the riding. When asked why they did not do similar efforts in the constituencies of other party leaders, the organizers said it was a matter of limited resources.

Candidate contests in the ridings
Candidates	Ridings	Party												
Candidates	Ridings	Lib	Con	NDP	PPC	Green	Ind	BQ	MLP	CHP	Rhino	Comm	Oth	Totals
3	15	15	15	15										45
4	60	60	60	60	27	21	2	7			1	1	1	240
5	113	112	112	112	85	78	9	20	7	7	2	4	17	565
6	95	95	95	95	84	81	34	35	5	10	8	4	24	570
7	37	37	37	37	32	33	19	10	12	10	7	7	18	259
8	13	13	13	13	12	11	14	2	6	2	4	3	11	104
9	6	6	6	6	4	5	11	2	2	2	4	2	4	54
10	2	2	2	2	2	1	3	1	2	1	1	2	1	20
11	1	1	1	1	1	1	2	1	1		1	1		11
91	1	1	1	1		1	83				1		3	91
Total	343	342	342	342	247	232	177	78	35	32	29	24	79	1,959

=== Party slogans ===
Party	English	French	Translation of French (unofficial)	Ref.
█ Liberal	"Canada Strong"	"Un Canada fort"	"A strong Canada"	
█ Conservative	"Canada First – for a Change"	"Le Canada d'abord – pour faire changement"	"Canada First – to make a Change"	
█ Bloc Québécois	—N/a	"Je choisis le Québec"	"I choose Québec"	
█ New Democratic	"In it for you"	"Du cœur au ventre"	"From the heart to the stomach" (literal); "To be brave"	
█ Green	"Change. Vote for it."	"Votez pour du changement"	"Vote for change"	

=== Policy platforms ===
Party	Full platform
█ Liberal	Canada Strong
█ Conservative	Canada First. For a Change
█ Bloc Québécois	Choisir le Québec
█ New Democratic	Made for People. Built for Canada.
█ Green	Change. Vote For It.

=== Endorsements ===
Endorsements received by each party
Type	Liberal	Conservative	Bloc Québécois	New Democratic
Media	The Economist; Toronto Star	National Post; Toronto Sun		
Public figures	Christy Clark; Andrew Furey; Mike Harcourt (Note: Also endorsed incumbent NDP MPs.); Susan Holt; Mike Myers; Ben Perrin; Neil Young	Conrad Black; Gordon Campbell; Drew Dilkens; Stephen Harper; Brett Kissel; Peter MacKay; Scott Moe; Caroline Mulroney; Moses Znaimer	Mario Pelchat	David Eby; Rachel Notley; Stewart Phillip; Glen Clark
Unions and business associations	International Union of Operating Engineers Local 793; Carpenters' Regional Council	Durham Regional Police Association; Friends of Free Enterprise in Canada; International Brotherhood of Boilermakers; Independent Contractors and Businesses Association; Merit Canada; Ottawa Police Association; Peel Regional Police Association; Sault Ste. Marie Police Association; Toronto Police Association; United Association Local 67; United Steelworkers Local Union 2251		Amalgamated Transit Union; Canadian Union of Public Employees; United Steelworkers

=== Leaders' debates ===
In its May 2022 report, the Leaders' Debates Commission recommended various improvements for future debates, and that it remain a permanent publicly funded entity to organize leaders' debates. In October 2024, the Leaders' Debate Commission announced that the English-language debate would be hosted by TVO's Steve Paikin, while the French-language debate would be hosted by Ici RDI's Patrice Roy. TVA Nouvelles had announced plans to host its own French-language debate with the Bloc, Conservative, Liberal, and NDP leaders, but cancelled the event after the Liberal Party withdrew.

On April 1, 2025, the commission announced that it had invited the leaders of the Bloc Québécois, Conservative Party, Green Party, Liberal Party, and New Democratic Party to the debates. Invitations were issued on the basis of meeting at least two of three conditions: having at least one sitting MP, recording at least 4% support in national opinion polling, and endorsing candidates in at least 90 percent of ridings. The Green Party's invitation was rescinded on April 16 as it ultimately ran candidates in 232 ridings (less than 70 percent) despite earlier submitting to the Commission that it would run candidates in every riding. The People's Party was not invited, as it did not meet the criteria of either holding a seat in Parliament or polling at least 4%. (Note: Under the 2021 debate rules, the party would have qualified by having received over 4% (4.94%) of the vote in the 2021 election. This criterion was removed in the 2025 eligibility rules.)

On April 15, the leaders of the Bloc Québécois and the NDP suggested rescheduling the French language debate because of the debate coinciding with the final hockey game of the Montreal Canadiens' regular season, after it became clear the game would decide whether the Canadiens would make the playoffs. The Commission declined to reschedule the debate to a different day, but agreed to move the start time two hours earlier to 6:00 pm EDT.

A post-debate news scrum after the French language debate was dominated by the far-right Rebel News and other right-wing media outlets, leading to complaints from other journalists at the event. Michel Cormier, the commission's executive director, responded that he was "unaware" that Rebel News and another organization associated with Rebel founder Ezra Levant were registered as third-party advertisers with Elections Canada. In an interview, David Cochrane of CBC News asked Cormier about the fairness of the distribution of questions among outlets and the type of questions asked. Cormier responded, "There's only so much we can do to control free speech." During the English language debate the next day, CTV News and The Globe and Mail reported a disturbance between Levant and journalists from other outlets, and a Global News reporter suggested that Rebel staff tried to interfere with the live broadcast of the debate. Cormier abruptly cancelled the planned news scrum, citing security concerns, as Montreal Police secured the venue.

2025 Canadian general election debates
Date	Organizers	Location	Language	Moderator	P Participant R Rescinded invitation					Source
Date	Organizers	Location	Language	Moderator	Carney	Poilievre	Blanchet	Singh	Pedneault (Note: Despite having two co-leaders, the Greens chose Pedneault to represent them in all debates and interviews.)	Source
April 16, 2025	Leaders' Debates Commission	Maison de Radio-Canada, Montreal	French	Patrice Roy	P	P	P	P	R (Note: Invited on April 1. Invitation rescinded on April 16 due to the party running candidates in fewer than 90% of ridings.)	
April 17, 2025	Leaders' Debates Commission	Maison de Radio-Canada, Montreal	English	Steve Paikin	P	P	P	P	R	

== Opinion polling ==
Evolution of voting intentions according to polls conducted during the 2025 Canadian federal election campaign period, graphed from the data in the tables below. Trendlines are 30-poll local regressions, with polls weighted by proximity in time and a logarithmic function of sample size. 95% confidence ribbons represent uncertainty about the trendlines, not the likelihood that actual election results would fall within the intervals.

Evolution of voting intentions according to polls conducted during the pre-campaign period of the 45th Canadian federal election, graphed from the data in the table below. Trendlines are 30-poll local regressions, with polls weighted by proximity in time and a logarithmic function of sample size. 95% confidence ribbons represent uncertainty about the trendlines, not the likelihood that actual election results would fall within the intervals.

== Results ==
The Liberals maintained their status as being the largest party in the House of Commons and won the popular vote for the first time since the 2015 election, after having lost the popular vote in the 2019 and 2021 federal elections.

Summary of the 2025 Canadian federal election
Party	Party leader	Candidates	Seats					Popular vote				
Party	Party leader	Candidates	2021	Dissol.	2025	Change from 2021	% seats	Votes	Vote change	%	pp change	% where running
Liberal	Mark Carney	342 (Note: In the riding of Ponoka—Didsbury, Zarnab Zafar was endorsed by the Liberal Party, but, due to a clerical error with Elections Canada, her party affiliation was not registered.)	160	152	169	▲9	49.27%	8,595,488	▲3,038,859	43.76%	▲11.14pp	43.91%
Conservative	Pierre Poilievre	342 (Note: In the riding of Québec Centre, Conservative candidate Chanie Thériault had her paperwork rejected by Elections Canada; the party did not specify the reason(s).)	119	120	144	▲25	41.98%	8,113,484	▲2,366,074	41.31%	▲7.57pp	41.43%
Bloc Québécois	Yves-François Blanchet	78	32	33	22	▼10	6.41%	1,236,349	▼65,276	6.29%	▼1.35pp	27.65%
New Democratic	Jagmeet Singh	342 (Note: In the riding of South Shore—St. Margarets, NDP candidate Brendan Mosher dropped out of the race for personal reasons. Hayden Henderson was endorsed by the NDP, but was listed on the ballot as an Independent candidate.)	25	24	7	▼18	2.04%	1,234,673	▼1,801,675	6.29%	▼11.53pp	6.30%
Green	Elizabeth May & Jonathan Pedneault	232	2	2	1	▼1	0.29%	238,892	▼158,096	1.22%	▼1.11pp	1.75%
People's	Maxime Bernier	247	–	–	–	Steady	–	136,977	▼704,016	0.70%	▼4.24pp	0.94%
Independent and No Affiliation		177 (Note: 159 Independents, 18 No Affiliation; 83 (74 Ind., 9 NA) participated in the Longest Ballot Committee protest in the riding of Carleton.)	–	3	–	Steady	–	39,498	▲7,017	0.20%	▲0.01pp	0.31%
Christian Heritage	Rodney L. Taylor	32	–	–	–	Steady	–	10,065	▲1,080	0.05%	Steady	0.46%
Rhinoceros	Chinook B. Blais-Leduc	29	–	–	–	Steady	–	7,063	▲978	0.04%	Steady	0.41%
United (Note: Name changed to Reforge Party in 2026.)	Grant S. Abraham	16	New	–	–	New	–	6,061	New	0.03%	New	0.57%
Libertarian (D)	Jacques Y. Boudreau	16	–	–	–	Steady	–	5,561	▲796	0.03%	Steady	0.57%
Marxist–Leninist	Anna Di Carlo	35	–	–	–	Steady	–	4,996	▲464	0.03%	Steady	0.25%
Communist	Elizabeth Rowley	24	–	–	–	Steady	–	4,685	▼15	0.02%	▼0.01pp	0.36%
Centrist	A. Q. Rana	19	–	–	–	Steady	–	3,314	▲2,666	0.02%	▲0.02pp	0.31%
Canadian Future	Dominic Cardy	19	New	–	–	New	–	3,123	New	0.02%	New	0.27%
Animal Protection	Liz White	7	–	–	–	Steady	–	1,301	▼1,245	0.01%	Steady	0.32%
Marijuana (D)	Blair T. Longley	2	–	–	–	Steady	–	133	▼1,898	0.00%	▼0.01pp	0.09%
Vacant				4	—N/a							
Total valid votes								19,641,663	▲2,727,388	100.00%	–	–
Total rejected ballots								169,857	▼5,711	0.86%	▼0.16pp	–
Total		1,959	338	338	343	▲5	100.00%			100.00%	–	100.00%
Electorate (eligible voters)/turnout												–
Note: Official results with two judicial recounts to be completed.
Source(s): Elections Canada (D) indicates a party deregistered before the next election

Two-party vote swing	Two-party seat swing	Two-party vote share
Liberals' performance by riding

=== Judicial recounts ===
On May 5, Irek Kusmierczyk, the Liberal candidate running in Windsor—Tecumseh—Lakeshore, applied for a judicial recount. In addition, for differences in votes slimmer than 0.1%, judicial recounts were automatically triggered in 3 ridings.

Riding		Initial validated results, first and second place			Recount			Judicially certified results, first and second place		
Riding		Candidate	Votes	%	Type	Start	End	Candidate	Votes	%
ON	Milton East—Halton Hills South	Kristina Tesser Derksen	32,130	48.26%	Automatic	May 13	May 16	Kristina Tesser Derksen	32,178	48.25%
ON	Milton East—Halton Hills South	Parm Gill	32,101	48.21%	Automatic	May 13	May 16	Parm Gill	32,157	48.22%
NL	Terra Nova—The Peninsulas	Anthony Germain	19,704	47.97%	Automatic	May 12	May 23	Jonathan Rowe	19,605	47.96%
NL	Terra Nova—The Peninsulas	Jonathan Rowe	19,692	47.94%	Automatic	May 12	May 23	Anthony Germain	19,593	47.93%
QC	Terrebonne	Nathalie Sinclair-Desgagné	23,340	38.77%	Automatic	May 8	May 10	Tatiana Auguste	23,352	38.741%
QC	Terrebonne	Tatiana Auguste	23,296	38.70%	Automatic	May 8	May 10	Nathalie Sinclair-Desgagné	23,351	38.739%
ON	Windsor—Tecumseh—Lakeshore	Kathy Borrelli	32,062	45.80%	Requested (granted by judge)	May 20	May 22	Kathy Borrelli	32,090	45.753%
ON	Windsor—Tecumseh—Lakeshore	Irek Kusmierczyk	31,985	45.69%	Requested (granted by judge)	May 20	May 22	Irek Kusmierczyk	32,086	45.747%

==== Terrebonne ====
After the Terrebonne recount result was announced, it emerged that a mail-in ballot had been returned by Canada Post because of a faulty address, even though the envelope had been preprinted by the office of the local returning officer. As the ballot was marked for the Bloc candidate, a tie vote would have forced a by-election. On May 14, Elections Canada announced that they had conducted an analysis revealing that only that ballot had come to their attention, but they were expanding their review of the special ballot voting system in general, which had been announced after a separate incident occurred in Coquitlam—Port Coquitlam. However, the agency declared that it regards the result of the judicial recount as final. According to reports by Radio-Canada and Le Devoir, the Bloc was not ruling out contesting the result in court but had to wait until the result of the recount was published in the Canada Gazette, which occurred on May 15. Auguste was consequentially able to be sworn in as MP for the riding.

On May 15, Yves-François Blanchet announced in Ottawa that that the Bloc would be applying to the Superior Court of Quebec to order a by-election on the basis of irregularities that occurred, not just on the ballot returned to the voter, but also on five other ballots that had been received by Elections Canada too late to be counted. He said, "Since Elections Canada cannot by themselves ask for the election to be repeated, we have to bring this situation in front of a judge, in a court, in order to do the election all over again." The application was filed in court on May 23, and the hearing took place in October 2025 where the request was rejected.

If it had been successful, this would have been the first time at the federal level that an election result had been overturned on such grounds. The last attempt to do so arose in Etobicoke Centre in 2011, where Ted Opitz defeated Borys Wrzesnewskyj by 26 votes. The application was allowed at first instance, but the ruling was reversed 4–3 on appeal to the Supreme Court of Canada, a process that took a year and a half to complete.

At the beginning of October, La Presse reported that the worker at the constituency office responsible for issuing the faulty address labels was aware of the error three weeks before Election Day but failed to advise the returning officer or the voters concerned. He swore an affidavit to that effect for use at the forthcoming court hearing on October 20. Stéphane Perrault, the chief electoral officer, noted that Elections Canada could have issued appropriate instructions to compensate for the error if it had been promptly informed at the time.

On October 27, the court ruled that a by-election would not be held. Quebec Superior Court justice Éric Dufour held that what happened did not constitute an irregularity as defined in Canadian election law, saying, "It is a simple human error, which sometimes occurs in general elections, committed inadvertently and without any dishonest or malicious intent."

On November 3, Sinclair-Desgagné announced that she would be appealing the ruling to the Supreme Court of Canada, saying, "The judgment of the Superior Court of Quebec contains several errors of fact as well as an interpretation of the law and jurisprudence that invites an appeal", and that she was also planning to set up a crowdfunding campaign to raise money for the litigation costs.

The hearing was held on February 13, 2026, and the Supreme Court gave oral judgment immediately afterwards, where it annulled the result of the election in the riding, making way for a by-election to be called. Auguste ceased to be an MP upon the release of the decision. The rationale for the decision will be released at a later date.

In the subsequent Terrebonne federal by-election on April 13, 2026, Auguste won the riding by a margin of 648 votes against 47 other candidates.

==== Terra Nova—The Peninsulas ====
The recount process proved to last longer than anticipated. The 279 ballot boxes had to be gathered together at a central secure location in Marystown before the process could start. All 41,670 ballots (including 579 that had initially been rejected) were re-examined, and about 1,000 ballots were determined to be in dispute. After working through the Victoria Day weekend, the work had to stop for two days because of a scheduled shutdown of the local water supply, which forced the closure of all public buildings. Work was completed on May 23, resulting in a flipping of the riding to the Conservatives.

== Summary analysis ==
Party candidates in 1st and 2nd place
Party in 1st place	Party in 2nd place					Total
Party in 1st place	Lib	Con	BQ	NDP	Grn	Total
Liberal		141	22	6		169
Conservative	135		2	6	1	144
Bloc Québécois	21	1				22
New Democratic	5	2				7
Green	1					1
Total	162	144	24	12	1	343

Principal races, according to 1st and 2nd-place results
Parties		Seats
█ Liberal	█ Conservative	276
█ Liberal	█ Bloc Québécois	43
█ Liberal	█ New Democratic	11
█ Conservative	█ New Democratic	8
█ Conservative	█ Bloc Québécois	3
█ Conservative	█ Green	1
█ Liberal	█ Green	1
Total		343

Party rankings (1st to 5th place)
Party	1st	2nd	3rd	4th	5th
Liberal	169	162	11		
Conservative	144	144	49	5	
Bloc Québécois	22	24	30	2	
New Democratic	7	12	243	79	1
Green	1	1	6	131	90
Independent			2	7	20
People's			1	90	110
United			1	1	5
Christian Heritage				5	6
Libertarian				2	6
Canadian Future				2	4
Communist				1	7
Rhinoceros				1	7
Centrist				1	5
Animal Protection				1	2
Marxist–Leninist					7

Change in size of average electorate (major parties, 2025 vs 2021 transposed results)
Party	2021 (transposed)		2025 results		Change	Change %
Party	Constituencies	Average electorate	Constituencies	Average electorate	Change	Change %
Liberal	343	16,200	342	25,133	8,933	55.14%
Conservative	343	16,756	342	23,724	6,968	41.59%
Bloc Québécois	78	16,687	78	15,851	-836	-5.01%
New Democratic	343	8,852	342	3,610	-5,242	-59.22%
Green	283	1,403	232	1,030	-373	-26.59%
People's	323	2,604	247	555	-2,049	-78.69%

=== Results by province ===
Distribution of seats and popular vote %, by party by province/territory (2025) (Note: The provinces' and territories' abbreviations are linked to articles providing the full provincial statistics.)
Party name		BC	AB	SK	MB	ON	QC	NB	NS	PE	NL	YT	NT	NU	Total
Liberal	Seats:	20	2	1	6	70	44	6	10	4	4	1	1	–	169
Liberal	Vote:	41.8	27.9	26.6	40.8	49.0	42.6	53.4	57.2	57.5	54.0	53.1	53.5	36.7	43.8
Conservative	Seats:	19	34	13	7	52	11	4	1	–	3	–	–	–	144
Conservative	Vote:	41.0	63.5	64.6	46.3	43.8	23.3	40.8	35.2	36.9	39.7	38.5	33.3	26.0	41.3
Bloc Québécois	Seats:						22								22
Bloc Québécois	Vote:						27.7								6.3
NDP	Seats:	3	1	–	1	–	1	–	–	–	–	–	–	1	7
NDP	Vote:	13.0	6.3	7.6	11.0	4.9	4.5	2.9	5.2	2.5	5.5	6.3	12.2	37.3	6.3
Green	Seats:	1	–	–	–	–	–	–	–	–	–	–	–	–	1
Green	Vote:	3.0	0.4	0.6	0.7	1.2	0.9	1.7	0.9	2.2	0.1	2.1	1.0	–	1.2
Independents and minor parties	Seats:	–	–	–	–	–	–	–	–	–	–	–	–	–	–
Independents and minor parties	Vote:	1.1	1.9	0.8	1.1	1.1	1.1	1.1	1.4	0.9	0.6	–	–	–	1.1
Seats:		43	37	14	14	122	78	10	11	4	7	1	1	1	343

=== Close races ===
Incumbents are denoted in bold and followed by (I).

Riding	Winner	Runner-up	Vote difference	Percentage difference
Terrebonne (details)	Tatiana Auguste	**Nathalie Sinclair-Desgagné (I)**	1	0.002%
Windsor—Tecumseh—Lakeshore	Kathy Borrelli	**Irek Kusmierczyk (I)**	4	0.006%
Terra Nova—The Peninsulas	Jonathan Rowe	Anthony Germain	12	0.03%
Milton East—Halton Hills South	Kristina Tesser Derksen	Parm Gill	21	0.03%
Nunavut	**Lori Idlout (I)**	Kilikvak Kabloona	41	0.54%
Vancouver Kingsway	**Don Davies (I)**	Amy Gill	303	0.60%
Kitchener Centre	Kelly DeRidder	**Mike Morrice (I)**	375	0.63%
Miramichi—Grand Lake	Mike Dawson	Lisa Harris	384	1.00%
Kitchener—Conestoga	**Tim Louis (I)**	Doug Treleaven	522	0.84%
Montmorency—Charlevoix	Gabriel Hardy	**Caroline Desbiens (I)**	524	0.88%

=== Seats that changed hands ===
Elections to the 44th Parliament of Canada – seats won/lost by party, 2021–2025
Party	2021	Gain from (loss to)										2025
Party	2021	Lib		Con		NDP		BQ		Grn		2025
Liberal	157			12	(18)	7		12	(1)			169
Conservative	126	18	(12)			10		1		1		144
New Democratic	24		(7)		(10)							7
Bloc Québécois	34	1	(12)		(1)							22
Green	2				(1)							1
**Total**	343	19	(31)	12	(30)	17	–	12	(1)	1	–	343

The following seats changed allegiance from the 2021 redistributed results.

Conservative to Liberal

- Bay of Quinte
- Calgary Confederation
- Carleton
- Cumberland—Colchester
- Kelowna
- Peterborough
- Sault Ste. Marie—Algoma
- South Shore—St. Margarets
- South Surrey—White Rock
- Toronto—St. Paul's
- Winnipeg West

Liberal to Conservative

- Aurora—Oak Ridges—Richmond Hill
- Brampton West
- Calgary McKnight
- Cambridge
- Hamilton East—Stoney Creek
- Kitchener South—Hespeler
- Long Range Mountains
- Markham—Unionville
- Newmarket—Aurora
- Richmond Centre—Marpole
- Richmond Hill South
- Sudbury East—Manitoulin—Nickel Belt
- Terra Nova—The Peninsulas
- Vaughan—Woodbridge
- Windsor—Tecumseh—Lakeshore
- York Centre

NDP to Liberal

- Burnaby Central
- Churchill—Keewatinook Aski
- Esquimalt—Saanich—Sooke
- Hamilton Centre
- New Westminster—Burnaby—Maillardville
- Port Moody—Coquitlam
- Victoria

NDP to Conservative

- Cowichan—Malahat—Langford
- Edmonton Griesbach
- Elmwood—Transcona
- Kapuskasing—Timmins—Mushkegowuk
- London—Fanshawe
- Nanaimo—Ladysmith
- North Island—Powell River
- Similkameen—South Okanagan—West Kootenay
- Skeena—Bulkley Valley
- Windsor West

Bloc Québécois to Liberal

- Abitibi—Baie-James—Nunavik—Eeyou
- Beauport—Limoilou
- Châteauguay—Les Jardins-de-Napierville
- La Prairie—Atateken
- LaSalle—Émard—Verdun
- Les Pays-d'en-Haut
- Longueuil—Saint-Hubert
- Mont-Saint-Bruno—L'Acadie
- Rivière-des-Mille-Îles
- Terrebonne
- Thérèse-De Blainville
- Trois-Rivières

Bloc Québécois to Conservative

- Montmorency—Charlevoix

Green to Conservative

- Kitchener Centre

== Analysis and aftermath ==
Ternary plots of benchmark election results
1930

1958

1980

1984

1988

2015
Electoral districts identified by colours of winning parties
Ternary plots of current election results
2021 (transposed results)

2025
Electoral districts won identified by Conservative (blue), Liberal (red), NDP (orange), BQ (cyan) and Green (Green)

Significant milestones included the following:

- the Liberals won the popular vote for the first time since 2015
- they earned their highest vote share since 1980, as well as the highest vote share for any party in a federal election since 1984.
- the election saw the highest turnout since 1993, with 69.5% of eligible voters casting a ballot.
- both the Liberal Party and the Conservative Party improved upon their vote share and seat count from 2021, while the other parties all lost ground
- this was the first election since 2000 in which the Liberals, or any party, polled over 40 percent; the first since 1988 in which the Conservatives did so; (Note: At that time, their predecessor party, the Progressive Conservative Party of Canada (then led by Brian Mulroney) was active. Moreover, this remains true even when combining the Progressive Conservative and Reform/Canadian Alliance vote shares from 1993 through 2000.) and the first time since 1930 in which both passed that threshold
- this was the most concentrated the popular vote had been in support of the top two parties since 1958, with over 85% voting Liberal or Conservative

The election results represented a significant contrast to the polling estimates prior to the election. In December 2024, the Conservatives had a 20 percentage point lead over the Liberals; however, Trudeau's resignation and U.S. president Donald Trump's hostile foreign policy towards Canada were reasons that led to a significant change in public opinion that favored the Liberals. Comparisons have been made to the Australian federal election held on May 3, 2025, where the incumbent centre-left government, led by the Labor Party, overturned a significant deficit in polling, made gains, and remained in government. Commentators spoke of a negative "Trump effect" as the Australian opposition conservative leader Peter Dutton also lost his seat.

Strategic voting played a role in the election, which benefitted the Liberals, moving it closer to a two-party system. The declining performance of the New Democratic Party (NDP) in the election was also attributed to strategic voting. Alex Marland, the Jarislowsky chair in trust and political leadership at Acadia University in Nova Scotia, said that Trump's interference and threats significantly affected the results, stating, "It really galvanized progressives, people on the political left. You can see the collapse of the NDP vote. A big reason for people who would have voted NDP ending up voting Liberal was really because of fear over Donald Trump." Gabriel Arsenault, a political science professor at the Université de Moncton, emphasised the results being closer to a two-party system. In December 2024, the Liberals and Conservatives were polling together around 65 percent of the intention votes versus the around 85 percent they got in the election. In reference to the NDP, Arsenault added, "[Pierre] Poilievre sought votes among workers, and usually that would be the main group where the NDP got its votes, so I think it has to transform itself." As for the Green Party, which won only one seat, Arsenault said, "We'll have to see if this is just temporary because of Trump, or [if] this is illustrative of a bigger trend here."

Abacus Data determined the following migration patterns of voters from 2021:

Migration of voters - 2021 to 2025
Of those who voted in 2021	Proportion (%) going to			
Of those who voted in 2021	Lib	Con	NDP	BQ
Liberal	78	16	3	3
Conservative	7	89	2	2
New Democratic	42	21	32	4
Bloc Québécois	15	13	2	71
Did not vote in that election	44	43	6	4

Analysis by The Economist, which called the 29-point swing comeback in polls by the Liberals as "one of the widest on record in any democracy", noted that the two best predictors of the margin shift from Conservatives to Liberals were education and immigration: the Liberals gained in ridings with more university graduates and native-born voters, while the Conservatives benefited in ridings with more voters who were either foreign-born or did not hold degrees. Religion was also a factor in certain results, where secular and Muslim voters tended to favour the Liberals while more heavily Jewish ridings swung to the Conservatives.

According to a postmortem inquiry by the Toronto Star, the Liberals and Conservatives both experienced fortunate incidents as well as missteps. Members of the Liberal election team were estimating a final seat total of 181 to 190 seats, while the party's computer modelling was suggesting a lesser number. While a Léger poll in February suggested a dead heat between the two parties if Carney became the Liberal leader, the Liberals were relieved when the Tories initially chose to focus their attacks on Carney's actions during his time in the private sector, as opposed to the more effective gambit in the last two weeks of the campaign of emphasizing the point that the Liberals "might be trying to pull a fast one on the country" by switching leaders. The Liberals were slow to catch on to underlying shifts in voter sentiments until candidates were reporting from key races in the Greater Toronto Area, Alberta and BC that second-generation Sikhs, Hindus, Muslims and Italians (especially among younger men) were moving over to the Conservatives because of issues relating to public safety and immigration. Liberal attempts to address the issue chose to focus on gun control, an area voters did not consider relevant. On the other side, many Conservatives believed that the tone set by Poilievre turned off many traditional supporters, and there was evidence that the significant lead the party enjoyed during the previous year was the result of "[mistaking] the poll numbers for our own popularity, as opposed to disgust with Justin Trudeau". Morale among the party's backbenchers and grassroots was also affected by Poilievre's management of the campaign, and it was estimated that 110 riding nomination races were cancelled in favour of parachuting candidates directly in. After election day, when it became apparent that both parties had come up short of their expected majority, the question posed by one Liberal insider was, "How do you end up winning Bay of Quinte but losing Brampton West?" Many observed that the resultant grouping of Liberal supporters was significantly influenced by the influx of NDP voters, Quebec nationalists and "white men over 50", while Conservative efforts to attract younger voters, union members and immigrants proved to be successful.

=== Liberal Party ===
The Liberal Party regained a leading position in this election, reversing previous polling in which it trailed behind the Conservative Party. With a vote share of 43.8%, it achieved its highest level of support since 1980 and marked its strongest performance since taking office in 2015. They won seats in every province (the only party to do so) and exceeded 40% of the popular vote in every province except Alberta and Saskatchewan. Although the party secured 169 seats—falling three seats short of the 172 needed for a majority—it successfully formed a minority government. The Liberals led in Ontario, Quebec, British Columbia, and the Atlantic provinces. Quebec saw the most notable gains, with the party winning 10 more seats than in 2021. The Liberals also performed well in the city of Toronto and the southern Greater Toronto Area (primarily in the more urban and affluent areas south of Highway 401), reclaiming a seat lost in last year's by-election, and produced dominant margins in the Ottawa region. However, their seat count in Ontario dropped by five compared to the previous election, in part due to losses in the York Region north of Toronto. In Manitoba, the party won six seats, just one fewer than the Conservatives.

Carney made a victory speech on election night after winning his seat of Nepean; he emphasized that regardless of which party Canadians supported, he would strive to be a prime minister for all. He said he would "always do my best to serve everyone who calls Canada home". On international matters, Carney expressed serious concern regarding Trump. He criticized Trump for imposing tariffs and using trade pressure in attempts to weaken Canada's economy, while also publicly questioning the country's sovereignty. He said, "There is someone trying to undermine our economy: Donald Trump." In response to Trump's past remarks suggesting that Canada could become the 51st state of the U.S., Carney firmly declared, "The United States is not Canada. Canada will never, under any circumstance, become part of the United States." Carney received congratulations from domestic leaders, including Premier Danielle Smith of Alberta, Premier Doug Ford of Ontario, Premier Scott Moe of Saskatchewan, and Mayor Olivia Chow of Toronto.

=== Conservative Party ===
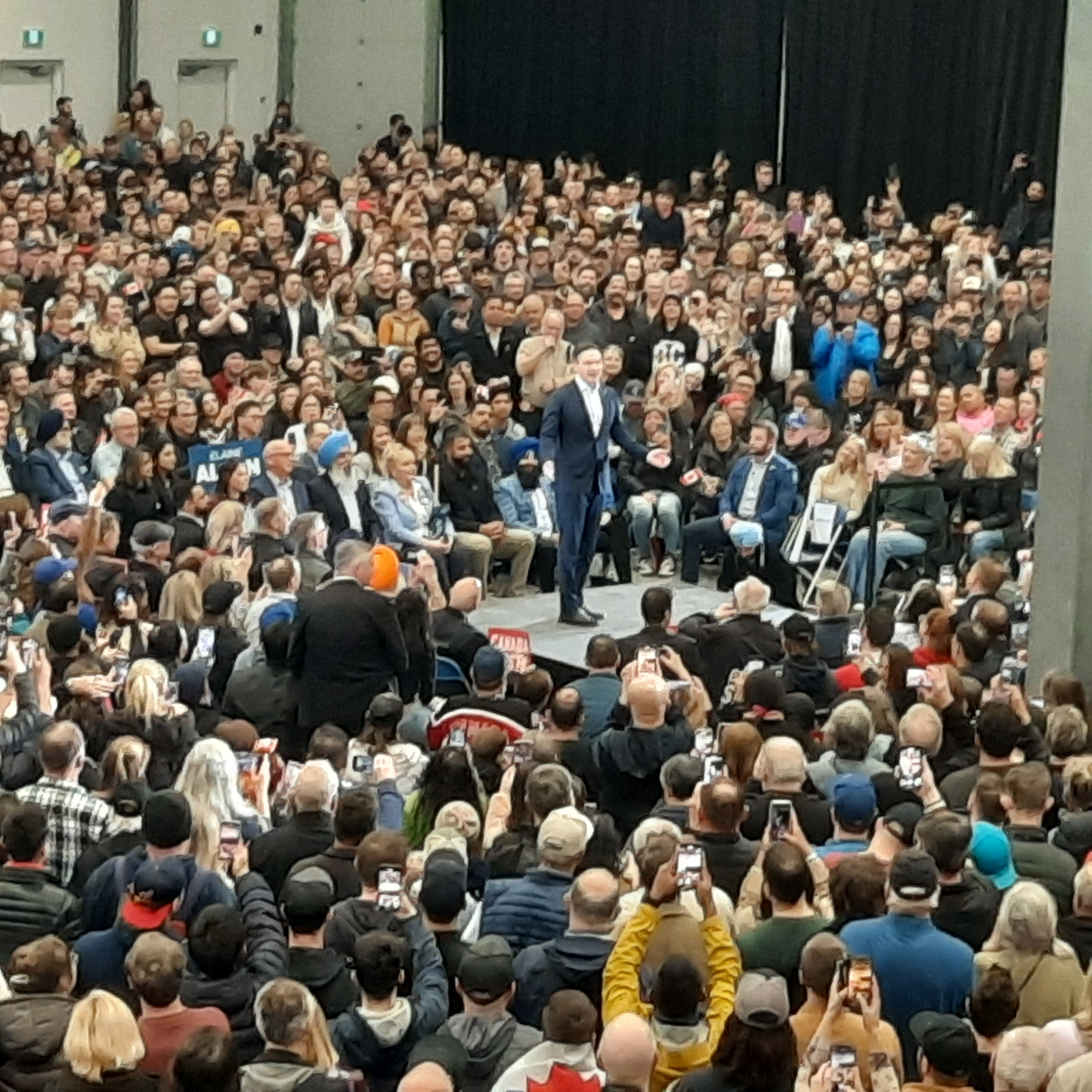
Pierre Pollievre's campaign opening in Surrey, British Columbia

The Conservative Party achieved its highest vote share in decades in this election, garnering 41.3% of the vote—the highest for a conservative party since 1988 and the best result since the modern party's founding in 2003. They exceeded 35% of the popular vote in every province except for Quebec. The party secured 144 seats, second only to its majority government victory in 2011. Nevertheless, it still fell short of the Liberal Party in both vote share and seat count. Despite the overall electoral defeat, the Conservatives maintained a strong advantage in the three Prairie provinces. The party also made notable gains in areas traditionally less favourable to it, including the Greater Toronto Area in Ontario (particularly in York Region and Brampton), Vancouver Island and surrounding coastal regions in British Columbia, as well as several working-class regions such as Windsor and northern Ontario which political analyst Douglas Todd stated "helped shatter the myth that people who normally vote NDP would never vote for the Conservatives". Polling conducted for CBC News by Kolosowski Strategies found that Conservative gains in the northern Greater Toronto Area were driven by concerns about affordability, crime and immigration policies.

In total, the Conservatives gained 24 seats—seven more than the Liberals' gain of 16 seats. The largest increase was in Ontario, where they picked up 15 new seats, a third of which were in York Region; in British Columbia, they gained 5 seats, just one fewer than the Liberals. They also gained two seats in Newfoundland and Labrador and one seat in Quebec, while in Nova Scotia the party lost 2 seats and was left with only one. After the election results were announced, Conservative Party leader Pierre Poilievre delivered a concession speech in which he congratulated Prime Minister Mark Carney and stated he would work with all parties to end Donald Trump's tariffs. Poilievre also emphasized that he would continue to serve as Conservative Party leader, and that the party would remain an effective opposition in Parliament, focusing on issues such as the economy, cost of living, housing, and defending the interests of Canadians. Shortly after the speech, it was confirmed that he had been defeated by Liberal Party candidate Bruce Fanjoy in the riding of Carleton. Voters in the area told the CBC that Poilievre's support for the 2022 Freedom Convoy protest which occupied part of the city core and his pledge to reduce the public service contributed to his loss in the riding. Calls from provincial conservative premiers for Poilievre to resign as Conservative leader grew following the election result.

While Poilievre held no seat in the House of Commons, he was ineligible to continue as leader of the Opposition. This resulted in former Conservative leader Andrew Scheer being appointed leader of the Opposition on an interim basis.

A few days after election day, Conservative MP Damien Kurek, who was re-elected with over 80% of the vote in the Alberta riding of Battle River—Crowfoot, one of the party's safest ridings, announced his intention to resign in order to allow Poilievre to run in the succeeding by-election. Poilievre was elected in the by-election on August 18, and returned to the House of Commons.

=== Bloc Québécois ===
In this election, the Bloc Québécois garnered only 6.3% of the national vote, with support in Quebec dropping to 27.7%. The party won 22 seats, ten fewer than in the previous election, marking its third-worst performance in history. The Bloc failed to consolidate its advantage in Quebec, with the Liberal Party capturing key constituencies. Several prominent members, including the party's House Leader Alain Therrien, were defeated.

After learning the results of the election, party leader Yves-François Blanchet admitted his party had suffered a setback and accepted the voters' decision. He acknowledged the party's losses but pointed to external factors, such as Trump's tariff policies and controversial remarks about Canada, as well as the Liberal Party's perceived use of fear-based campaigning, as contributing to the defeat. Blanchet stressed that the Bloc would remain committed to standing up for Quebec's interests and called for cooperation among all parties in Parliament to meet the country's shared responsibilities. He added that the Bloc would continue to play a constructive role in Parliament to ensure Québécois voices are not sidelined at the federal level. He also noted that the seats won by the Bloc place it in a position of influence in a minority government. He said, "We will speak up for Quebec clearly and confidently, but we will do so in a way that fosters unity rather than division."

=== New Democratic Party ===
In this election, the New Democratic Party secured only 6.3% of the national vote and won just 7 seats, marking the worst result in its history. They received slightly fewer votes than even the Bloc Quebecois, despite running nationally as opposed to only in Quebec. Compared to the previous election, the party lost 18 seats — 7 to the Liberals and 10 to the Conservatives (with one seat dissolved) — and its vote share dropped significantly. In no province did they finish higher than third in the popular vote or receive more than 13% of such vote. Party leader Jagmeet Singh also failed to win re-election (finishing third place in his riding of Burnaby Central). Falling short of the 12-seat threshold, the NDP lost its official party status for the first time since 1993. After the election, certain observers and party insiders questioned the allocation of resources to crucial ridings in the final days of the campaign, noting that eight others had closer races than Burnaby Central and thus better chances for victory.

On election night, having been defeated in Burnaby Central and with the NDP at risk of losing official party status, Jagmeet Singh announced that he would resign as party leader once an interim leader was chosen in advance of the 2026 leadership election. Singh confirmed that he had informed the party's senior leadership of his incoming resignation and said he would assist with the transition until an interim leader is chosen. In a candid statement, Singh acknowledged the outcome as disappointing but emphasized that it was part of the democratic process. As party leader, he stated he must take political responsibility for the result. Singh said, "Leading the New Democratic Party has been one of the greatest honours of my life, although today's result is difficult to accept, my belief in this party remains unshaken. I believe it is time for new voices and new energy to take us into the next chapter." Don Davies was selected as interim leader on May 5, 2025.

In December 2025, an internal postmortem review concluded that voters had settled on a "Trump/Carney/Poilievre" focus as early as March, and the party was unable to counter it. The party had "forgotten how to communicate with working-class voters" and "the party's language often [felt] exclusionary, academic, or moralizing ... [People were] saying the party [communicated] in ways that obscure material issues and [alienated] the very people equity is meant to include."

=== Green Party ===
The Green Party won only one seat, one less than the previous election, receiving the party's worst popular vote since 2000. Its national vote share was 1.2%, a drop of 1.13 percentage points from 2.33% in 2021. The only seat secured was in the British Columbia riding of Saanich—Gulf Islands, where party leader Elizabeth May was re-elected. Meanwhile, co-leader Jonathan Pedneault failed to win in the riding of Outremont, coming in at 5th place.

After the election results were announced, Green Party co-leader May expressed her gratitude for once again earning the trust and support of voters in her riding, and voiced her hopefulness about the party retaining a seat in the context of a minority government. She acknowledged that although the Green Party's overall national performance was disappointing, with a historically low share of the vote, she remains committed to the importance of environmental and social justice issues and will continue to advocate for them in Parliament. May emphasized that an individual victory is not an endpoint, but part of a broader effort to advance national environmental policy and democratic reform. She also expressed openness to taking on a more active role in Parliament in the future. On August 19, May announced her intention to resign as party leader.

On the other hand, Green Party co-leader Pedneault expressed regret that the party had won only one seat and failed to gain broad support from voters. He acknowledged that the Greens had not achieved the breakthrough they had hoped for in this election. Pedneault stated that, as co-leader, he bore political responsibility for the outcome and thus chose to resign from his leadership position. He emphasized that this decision was not driven by personal disappointment, but by a commitment to responsible party leadership.

== Student vote results ==
Student votes are mock elections that run parallel to actual elections, in which students not of voting age participate. They are administered by Student Vote Canada. These are for educational purposes and do not count towards the results. The Conservatives won a minority government in the poll.

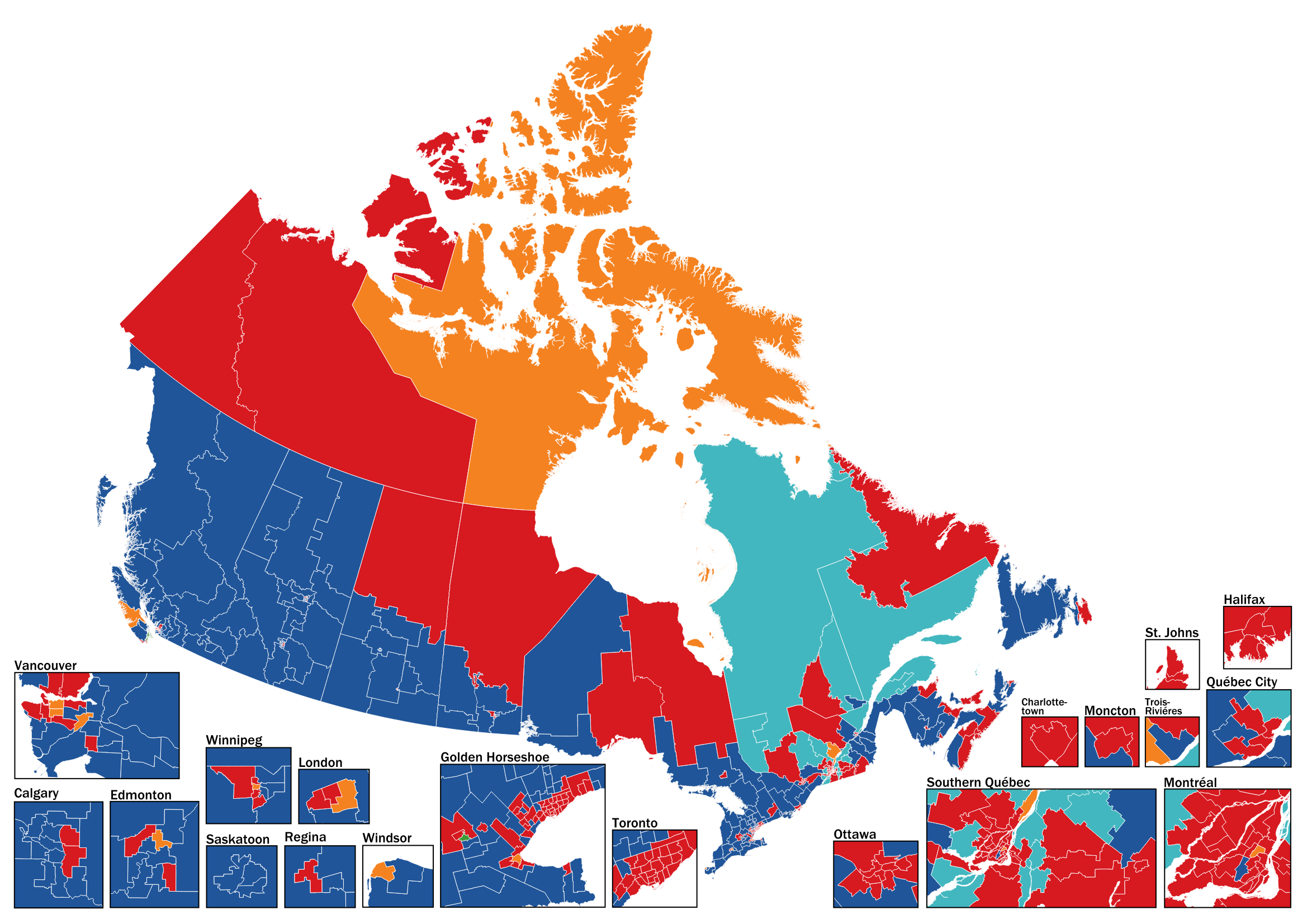
Map of the Student Vote results

Summary of the 2025 Canadian Student Vote
Party	Leader	Seats			Popular vote		
Party	Leader	Elected	%	Δ	Votes	%	Δ (pp)
Conservative	Pierre Poilievre	162	47.23	▲74	326,201	36.36	▲11.28
Liberal	Mark Carney	149	43.44	▲32	285,294	31.80	▲7.76
Bloc Québécois	Yves-François Blanchet	17	4.96	▼4	19,638	2.19	▲0.13
New Democratic	Jagmeet Singh	13	3.79	▼94	130,015	14.49	▼13.98
Green	Elizabeth May & Jonathan Pedneault	2	0.58	▼1	66,628	7.43	▼2.35
Other		0	0	Steady	37,735	4.21	▲0.27
People's	Maxime Bernier	0	0	Steady	31,625	3.53	▼3.27
Total		343	100.00	▲5	897,136	100.00	–
Source: Student Vote Canada

== See also ==
- 1911 Canadian federal election (Canada–US relations elections)
- 1988 Canadian federal election (Canada–US relations elections)
- 2025 Australian federal election (held within the same week and saw a similar increase in support for the incumbent government in opposition to Trump and also led to the Opposition Leader losing their seat)
- 2025 Canadian federal election in Alberta
- 2025 Canadian federal election in British Columbia
- 2025 Canadian federal election in Manitoba
- 2025 Canadian federal election in New Brunswick
- 2025 Canadian federal election in Newfoundland and Labrador
- 2025 Canadian federal election in Nova Scotia
- 2025 Canadian federal election in Ontario
- 2025 Canadian federal election in Prince Edward Island
- 2025 Canadian federal election in Quebec
- 2025 Canadian federal election in Saskatchewan
- 2025 Canadian federal election in the territories
- List of Canadian federal elections
