= 2025 Canadian federal election in New Brunswick =

- April 28, 2025

All 10 New Brunswick seats in the House of Commons
- Registered: 641,089
- Turnout: 463,103 (72.24%)
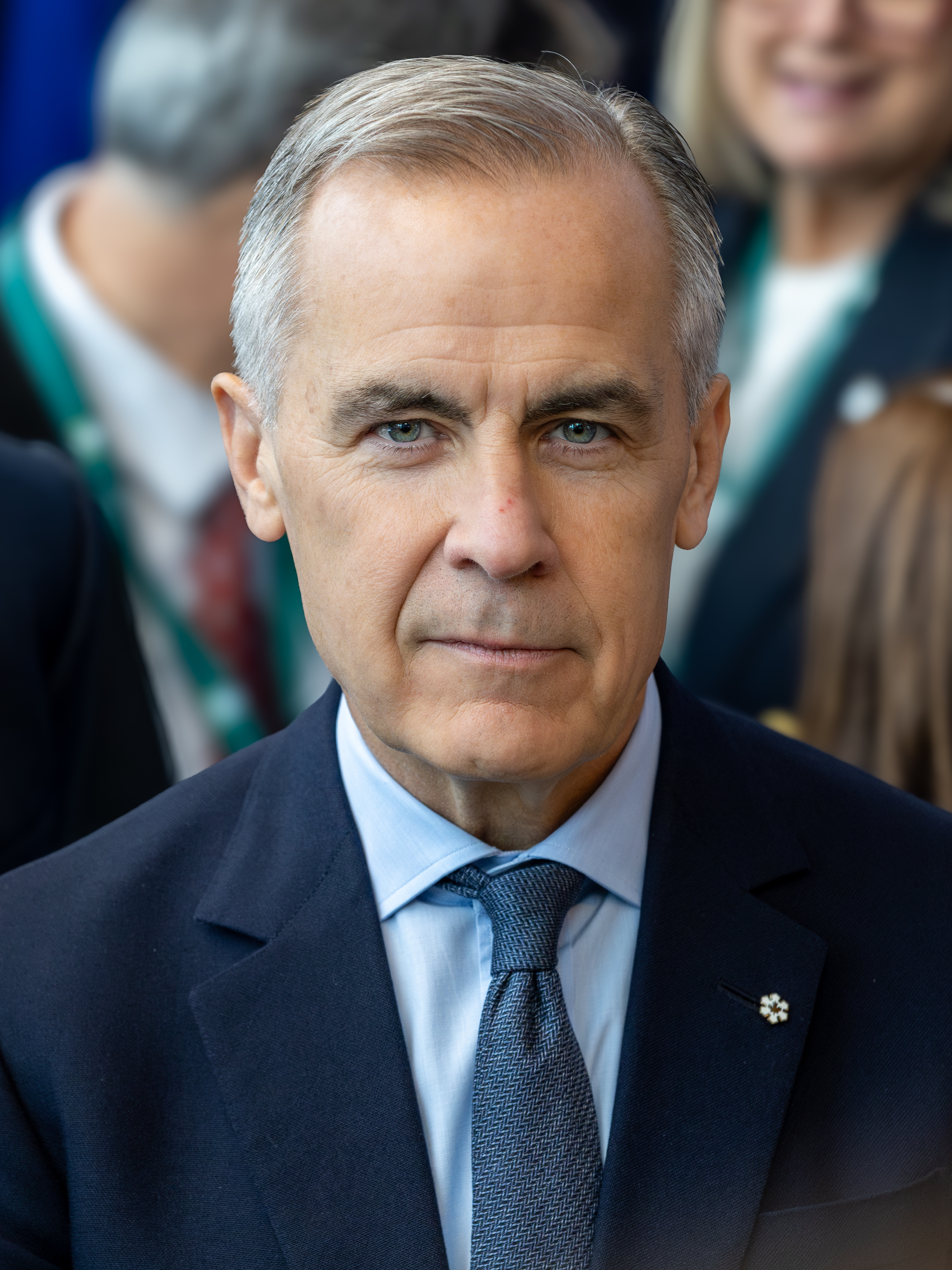

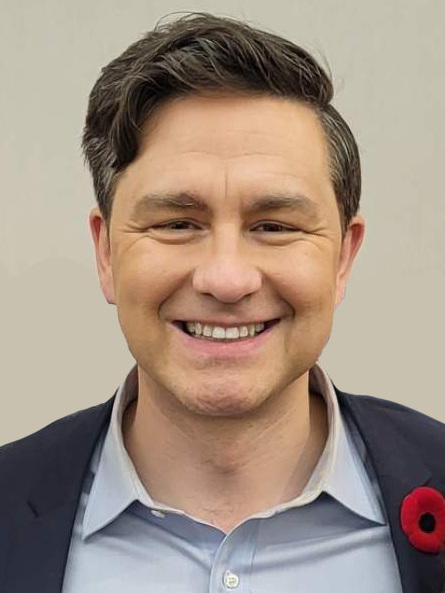

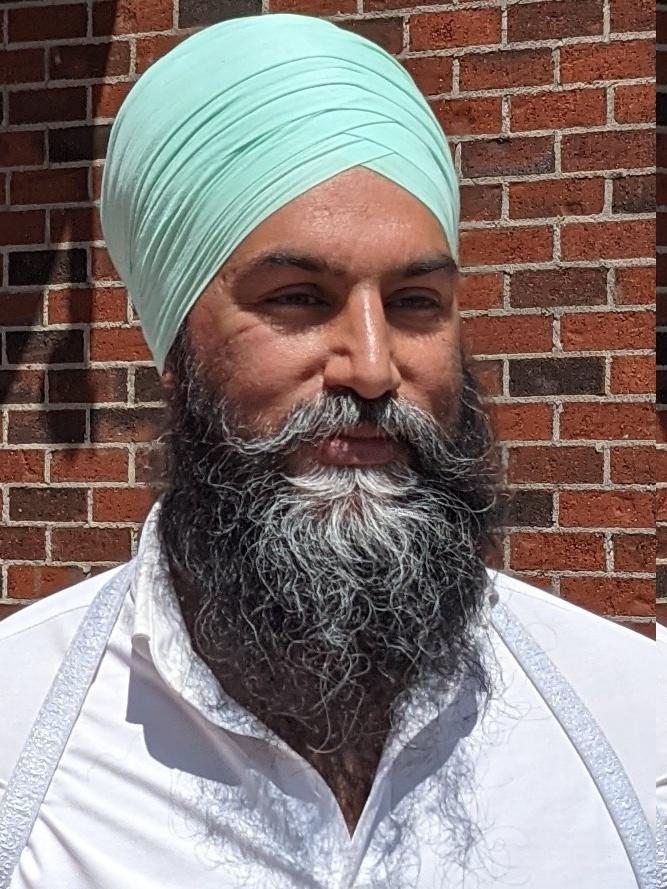
| | First party | Second party | Third party |
|---|---|---|---|
| Leader | Mark Carney | Pierre Poilievre | Jagmeet Singh |
| Party | Liberal | Conservative | New Democratic |
| Leader since | March 9, 2025 | September 10, 2022 | October 1, 2017 |
| Last election | 6 seats, 42.4% | 4 seats, 33.6% | 0 seats, 11.9% |
| Seats before | 6 | 4 | 0 |
| Seats won | 6 | 4 | 0 |
| Seat change | 0 | 0 | 0 |
| Popular vote | 247,473 | 189,003 | 13,531 |
| Percentage | 53.4% | 40.8% | 2.9% |
| Swing | ▲11.0% | ▲7.2% | ▼9.0% |
Prime minister before election
Mark Carney
Liberal
Prime minister after election
Mark Carney
Liberal

In the 2025 Canadian federal election, 10 members of Parliament were elected to the House of Commons from the province of New Brunswick (2.9% of all members).

== 2022 electoral redistribution ==
The 2025 Canadian federal election was the first election to utilize the electoral districts established following the 2022 Canadian federal electoral redistribution. The House of Commons increased from 338 seats to 343 seats. New Brunswick's seat allocation stayed the same at 10 seats. This ensures that the average population per constituency in New Brunswick is 77,561 (according to the 2021 Canadian census), which is 30,287 less people per electoral district than the national average.

== Predictions ==
| Polling firm | Last date of polling | Link | LPC | CPC | NDP | GPC | PPC | Others | Margin of error (Note: In cases when linked poll details distinguish between the margin of error associated with the total sample of respondents (including undecided and non-voters) and that of the subsample of decided/leaning voters, the former is included in the table. Also not included is the margin of error created by rounding to the nearest whole number or any margin of error from methodological sources. Most online polls (because of their opt-in method of recruiting panelists which results in a non-random sample) cannot have a margin of error. In such cases, shown is what the margin of error would be for a survey using a random probability-based sample of equivalent size.) | Sample size (Note: Refers to the total, "raw" sample size, including undecided and non-voters, and before demographic weighting is applied. Fractions in parentheses apply to rolling polls (see below) and indicate the proportion of the sample that is independent from the previous poll in the series.) | Polling method (Note: "Telephone" refers to traditional telephone polls conducted by live interviewers; "IVR" refers to automated Interactive Voice Response polls conducted by telephone; "online" refers to polls conducted exclusively over the internet; "telephone/online" refers to polls which combine results from both telephone and online surveys, or for which respondents are initially recruited by telephone and then asked to complete an online survey. "Rolling" polls contain overlapping data from one poll to the next.) | Lead |
|---|---|---|---|---|---|---|---|---|---|---|---|---|
| Narrative Research | August 18, 2024 | | 32 | 43 | 10 | 10 | 4 | 0 | ± 2.6 pp | 400 | Telephone | 11 |

== Results ==
=== Summary ===
New Brunswick summary seat results in the 2025 Canadian federal election
| Party | Votes | Vote % | Vote +/- | Seats | Seat +/- |
|---|---|---|---|---|---|
| Liberal | 247,473 | 53.4% | ▲11.0pp | 6 / 10 (60%) | 0 |
| Conservative | 189,003 | 40.8% | ▲7.2pp | 4 / 10 (40%) | 0 |
| New Democratic | 13,531 | 2.9% | ▼9.0pp | 0 / 10 (0%) | 0 |
| Green | 7,849 | 1.7% | ▼5.3pp | 0 / 10 (0%) | 0 |
| People's | 3,952 | 0.8% | ▼5.3pp | 0 / 10 (0%) | 0 |
| Independents and minor parties | 1,295 | 0.3% | ▼0.5pp | 0 / 10 (0%) | 0 |
| Total | 463,103 | 100% | – | 10 / 10 (100%) | 0 |

=== Comparison with national results ===
Results by party
| Party | Popular vote % | | | Seats in caucus |
| Party | NB | Natl. | diff. | Seats in caucus |
|---|---|---|---|---|
| Liberal | 53.4 | 43.7 | +12.1 | 6 / 169 (4%) |
| Conservative | 40.8 | 41.3 | -0.5 | 4 / 144 (3%) |
| New Democratic | 2.9 | 6.3 | -3.4 | 0 / 7 (0%) |
| Green | 1.7 | 1.2 | +0.5 | 0 / 1 (0%) |
| People's | 0.8 | 0.7 | +0.1 | no caucus |
| Total | – | – | – | 10 / 343 (3%) |

== Student vote results ==
Student votes are mock elections that run parallel to actual elections, in which students not of voting age participate. They are administered by Student Vote Canada. These are for educational purposes and do not count towards the results.

Summary of the 2025 Canadian Student Vote in New Brunswick
| Party | Leader | Seats | | | Popular vote | | |
| Party | Leader | Elected | % | Δ | Votes | % | Δ (pp) |
|---|---|---|---|---|---|---|---|
| Liberal | Mark Carney | 5 | 50.0 | ▼1 | 11,042 | 36.87 | ▲7.63 |
| Conservative | Pierre Poilievre | 5 | 50.0 | ▲1 | 10,606 | 35.41 | ▲13.80 |
| Green | Elizabeth May & Jonathan Pedneault | 0 | 0 | 0 | 3,261 | 10.89 | ▼6.00 |
| New Democratic | Jagmeet Singh | 0 | 0 | 0 | 3,223 | 10.76 | ▼11.09 |
| Other | | 0 | 0 | 0 | 1,002 | 3.35 | ▼2.44 |
| People's | Maxime Bernier | 0 | 0 | 0 | 814 | 2.72 | ▼3.59 |
| Total | | 10 | 100.00 | 0 | 29,948 | 100.00 | – |
Source: Student Vote Canada
