= Hatu gold mine =

Mining district of Xinjiang, China

- Location within Xinjiang
- Location: Toli County, Xinjiang, China; 45.5°N 84.8°E
- Products: Gold
- Opened: 2004
- Company: Dynasty Gold Corp. (70%); Xinjiang Non-Ferrous Metals Group (30%)

Hatu is the name of a gold deposit and associated gold mines in the West Junggar region in Tuoli County within the Xinjiang province of China. It is the largest gold deposit in West Junggar and occurs in the Central Asian Orogenic Belt. It is located less than one hour by road from Karamay. The area has an elevation of 1,300 with hills and minimal vegetation.

Hatu's geology has gold and copper in quartz. The occurrence has 56 tons of gold at a grade of 5 grams per ton estimated to be able to produce 546,000 ounces of gold.

Gold is extracted at number 1 and number 2 mines, the later known as the Qi2 Gold Mine Qi-2, Qiqiu No. 2, or Qi-II.

Mining activity started in May 2003 after Canadian mining company Dynasty Gold Corp entered into a joint venture with Chinese state mining company Xinjiang Non-Ferrous Metals Group. Dynasty held 70% ownership. By 2016, Dynasty was in a legal dispute with the state mining company. Dynasty Gold were accused of permitting the use of Uyghur forced labour at the mine. The company denied it had control of the mine. Sheri Meyerhoffer the Canadian Ombudsperson for Responsible Enterprise announced an investigation of the company in July 2023, mentioning that "DYG's assertion that it terminated its mineral exploration activities in Xinjiang in 2008 does not seem to be supported by its press releases dated January 25, 2021 and April 13, 2022".

== See also ==
- Xinjiang re-education camps
