= 2024–2025 Canadian political crisis =

Period of political instability in Canada

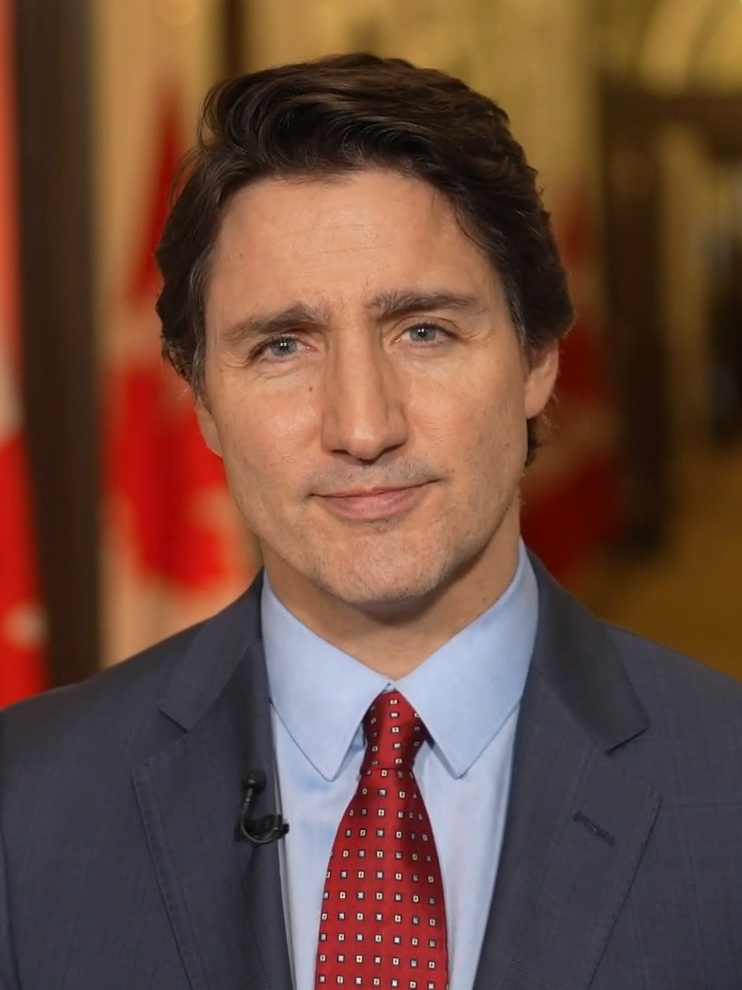
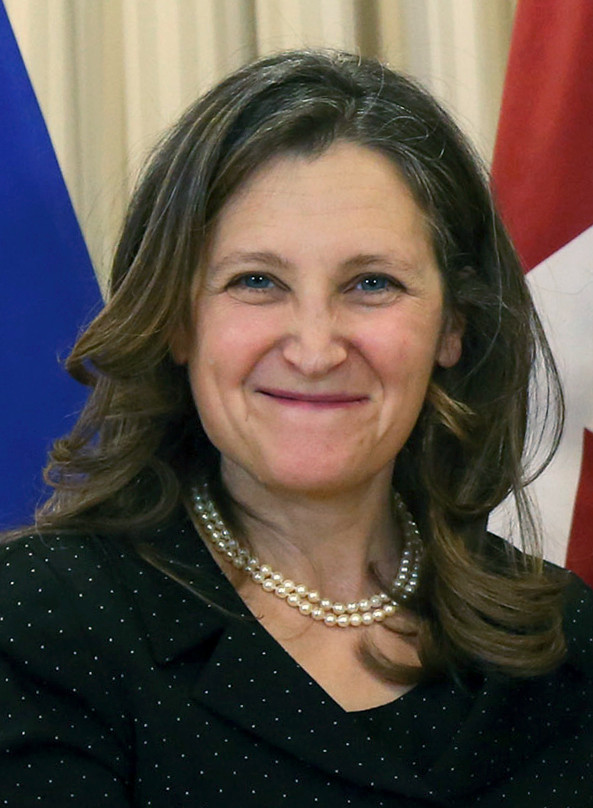
- Former Canadian prime minister Justin Trudeau (left). Former deputy prime minister and finance minister Chrystia Freeland (right).
- Date: 16 December 2024 – 6 January 2025 (3 weeks)
- Type: Political crisis
- Cause: Loss in public support for Justin Trudeau; Multiple by-election losses in 2024; Resignation of Chrystia Freeland
- Participants: 29th Canadian Ministry; Liberal Party of Canada
- Outcome: Resignation of Justin Trudeau; Launch of the 2025 leadership election; Prorogation of Parliament until March; Transition to Prime Minister Mark Carney

A political crisis emerged in Canada after Chrystia Freeland, the then-minister of finance and deputy prime minister, resigned from Cabinet on December 16, 2024. The events "sent shockwaves" through Canadian politics, leading to calls for Prime Minister Justin Trudeau to resign. On January 6, 2025, amid a mounting caucus revolt, Trudeau announced his resignation as leader of the Liberal Party and as the prime minister, pending the selection of his successor.

Freeland had been one of the most powerful and prominent figures in the Trudeau ministry and was considered among the prime minister's most loyal allies. Leading up to her resignation, their relationship had become increasingly strained over policy disagreements. On December 13, Trudeau told Freeland that he no longer wished to see her continue as Finance minister, but asked her to stay in Cabinet. Freeland mulled the offer over the subsequent days, but ultimately opted to resign. She published the resignation letter, which was heavily critical of Trudeau.

Freeland's resignation precipitated an escalating loss of political support for Trudeau. Leaders of the opposition parties immediately demanded his resignation. A growing number of Liberal MPs did the same in the days afterwards. The New Democratic Party (NDP), which had been in a confidence and supply agreement with the Liberals between March 2022 and September 2024, and whose support had been integral in defeating motions of no confidence against the government even after their withdrawal from the agreement, announced that they would vote to bring down the government when Parliament returned from its winter break.

When Trudeau eventually resigned, he concurrently announced the prorogation of Parliament until March. This decision would be subject to a legal challenge, but was upheld. The subsequent leadership election was won by Mark Carney, who was sworn in as Prime Minister on March 14 and announced the dissolution of Parliament nine days later. He led the Liberals to victory in the ensuing election, overturning a large deficit in opinion polling.

== Background ==
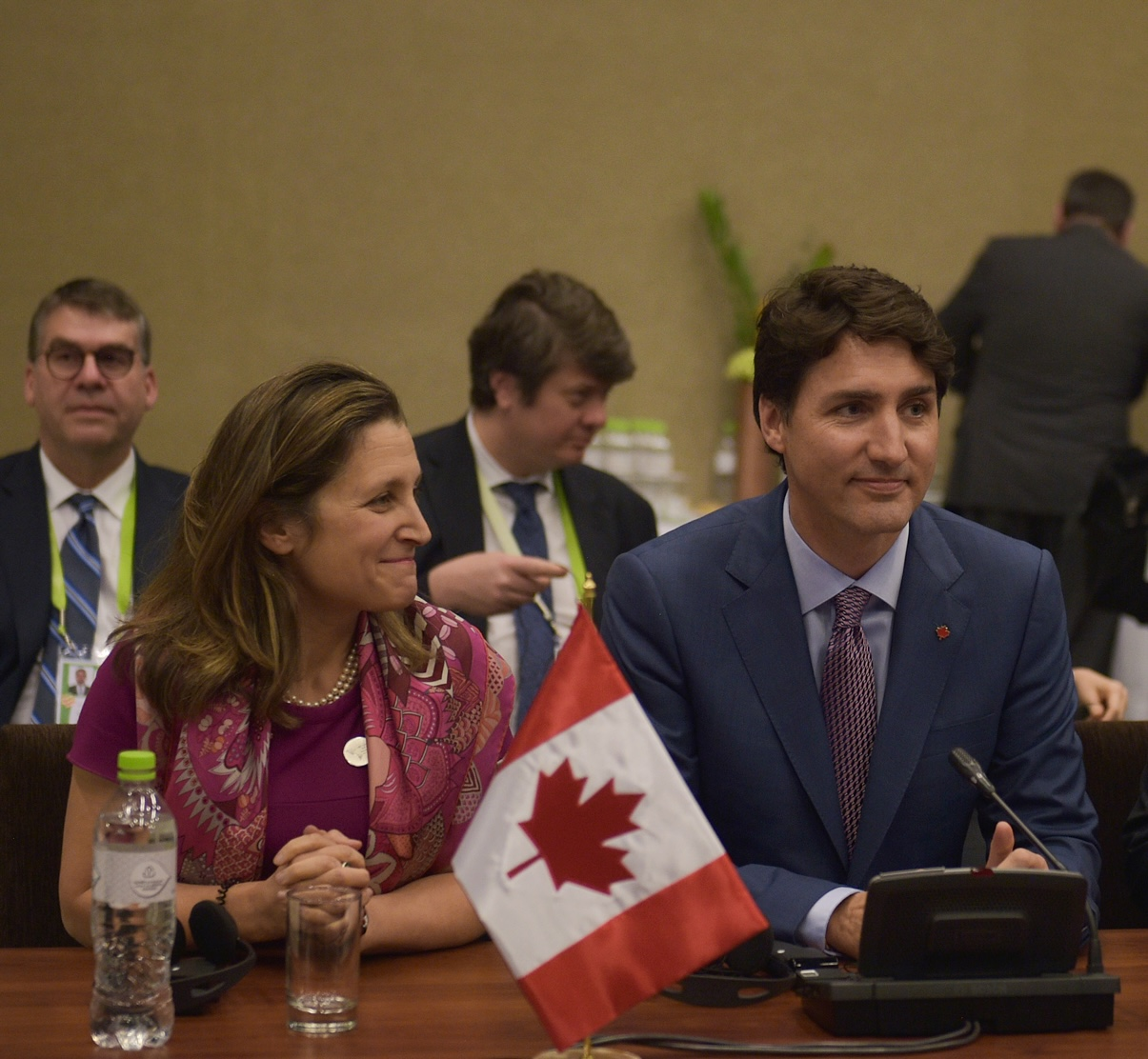
Freeland and Trudeau in 2018

Chrystia Freeland had been a member of Trudeau's government since he took office in 2015 and served in several key roles. In 2019, she was appointed deputy prime minister, and in 2020, she took the role of finance minister. Her prominence in the Trudeau government, and being tasked with critical files, often led her to being nicknamed the "minister of everything", and she was widely seen as a potential successor to Trudeau for the leadership of the Liberal Party. Freeland was also seen as exceptionally loyal to Trudeau.

Trudeau had, by then, been in power for nine years following his 2015 election victory. Trudeau had been reduced to a minority government in both the 2019 and 2021 elections. A confidence and supply agreement with the opposition NDP helped sustain the minority government from March 2022 until September 2024, when the NDP withdrew from the agreement. Trudeau had headed off a caucus revolt in October 2024 over concerns about his unpopularity amid Canada's cost-of-living crisis and rising Conservative poll numbers.

In the weeks leading up to Freeland's resignation, two other sudden departures from Trudeau's cabinet occurred. On November 20, 2024, Alberta MP Randy Boissonnault resigned from the Cabinet following allegations that he ran a business seeking federal contracts and falsely claimed to be Indigenous. On December 15, 2024, housing minister Sean Fraser announced his intention to leave the cabinet, citing family reasons.

== Resignation of Chrystia Freeland ==
On December 13, 2024, Trudeau informed Freeland in a Zoom call that he no longer wished to see her continue as finance minister. According to multiple sources, including The Globe and Mail and the Financial Post, Trudeau informed her that she would be replaced by Mark Carney; the latter also reported that Carney had accepted the offer. This development came after a months-long campaign by Trudeau to recruit Carney to the government. On the call, Trudeau indicated his wish for Freeland to remain in cabinet, and offered her a portfolio managing Canada's fraught relations with the US under the second Trump administration, but without a department. Freeland reportedly expressed her displeasure at the offer, telling Trudeau she could not credibly manage the file without a department. Freeland and her staff spent the weekend mulling her response. Meanwhile, Carney himself reportedly began having second thoughts about the offer over the same period.

On Monday morning, December 16, Freeland called Trudeau and informed him of her decision to resign from cabinet altogether. She subsequently shared her resignation letter on Twitter at 9:07 AM. In the letter, she stated, "to be effective, a Minister must speak on behalf of the Prime Minister and with his full confidence. In making your decision, you made clear that I no longer credibly enjoy that confidence." Freeland's letter was described as being scathing in tone by multiple outlets, and publicized her recent disagreements with the prime minister. On the same day, after Freeland's resignation, Carney reportedly spoke directly with Trudeau and said he would not join cabinet.

Freeland's resignation occurred in the context of the incoming second Trump administration in the United States threatening to impose 25 per cent tariffs upon Canada, with Freeland writing to Trudeau that Canada faces a grave challenge due to this. The previous week, reports had circulated about a rift between the prime minister and deputy prime minister, with Freeland opposing Trudeau's recent promise of $250 cheques to working Canadians who earned $150,000 or less in 2023. In her letter, Freeland referred to the proposal as a "costly political gimmick" and argued that the Canadian government should "[keep] our fiscal powder dry today, so we have the reserves we may need for a coming tariff war."

Freeland resigned hours before she was to announce the government's fall economic statement. Government house leader Karina Gould presented it in the House of Commons later that day. The statement showed a deficit of $61.9 billion for 2023–24, exceeding Freeland's target of $40.1 billion or less, and left Trump's tariff threats largely unaddressed.

== Loss of support for Justin Trudeau ==
Freeland's resignation was seen as a "clear rebuke" of Trudeau, with immediate speculation arising as to the future of his leadership. Trudeau faced calls to resign from both the opposition and his caucus, while polls indicated unpopularity for both the move and his government as a whole.

=== Liberal Party ===
At a speech at a Liberal fundraiser on the evening of Freeland's resignation, Trudeau remarked, "it was an eventful day, not an easy day." Sources reported Trudeau was considering proroguing Parliament or resigning. Ontario Liberal MP Chad Collins stated that the Liberal caucus was "not united" on the issue of Trudeau's continued leadership of the party, and said he believes "the only path forward for us is to choose a new leader, and to present a new plan to Canadians with a different vision," while Quebec Liberal MP Anthony Housefather said he believes "the prime minister has passed [his] shelf life" and should resign. Fellow Ontario MP Helena Jaczek agreed with Housefather and said that Trudeau "just doesn't represent what I want to see in a leader", while New Brunswick MP Wayne Long called Freeland's decision to leave cabinet "bold" and "a devastating blow" for the Prime Minister that should convince him to resign.

At a caucus meeting earlier that day, it was reported that Liberal MPs gave Freeland a standing ovation. British Columbia MP Rob Morrison shared hopes for a prorogued parliament, followed by a leadership review and general election. Ontario MP Judy Sgro told caucus colleagues, “I continue to believe that early in the New Year a plan moving forward will be announced including his [Trudeau’s] resignation and we will be consumed with new challenges”. Concerning the possibility of Trudeau's resignation, Ontario MP and Deputy House Leader Mark Gerretsen said “It’s really difficult for him to come to any other conclusion at this point”, and said most of his riding's constituents wanted Trudeau to resign.

Several other Liberal MPs called on Trudeau to resign, including Alberta MP George Chahal, British Columbia MPs Ken Hardie, Parm Bains, and Patrick Weiler, Manitoba MP Ben Carr, New Brunswick MPs René Arseneault, Jenica Atwin, and Serge Cormier, Newfoundland and Labrador MP Ken MacDonald, Ontario MPs Chandra Arya, Yvan Baker, Valerie Bradford, Francis Drouin, Ali Ehsassi, Peter Fragiskatos, and Rob Oliphant, Prince Edward Island MPs Sean Casey and Heath MacDonald, Quebec MPs Sophie Chatel and Alexandra Mendès, and Yukon MP Brendan Hanley. Ontario Liberal MP James Maloney, on the other hand, told reporters that Trudeau retained the confidence of the caucus, while chief government whip Ruby Sahota said Trudeau still had her "full support".

Newfoundland and Labrador MP Joanne Thompson also expressed her support for Trudeau, saying that it was "not the time for [caucus] to fracture" in the face of the 25% tariffs, while Newfoundland and Labrador MP Churence Rogers announced he would not seek re-election but still supported Trudeau, claiming his decision not to seek re-election was separate from the "turmoil" in the caucus. Nova Scotia MP Jaime Battiste said he would continue to support Trudeau in 2025, with the reason being that the two are ideologically similar on protecting the environment, while Ontario MP Marcus Powlowski said that despite backing the Prime Minister, Powlowski accepted that Trudeau could not win the next general election as party leader and should prorogue parliament in order for a leadership race to occur.

By December 21, the number of Liberal MPs publicly calling for Trudeau's resignation was 21, while it was reported that 50 Liberal MPs – roughly one-third of the Liberal caucus – privately wanted Trudeau to resign. Chandra Arya commented that Freeland "appears to be the person around whom the caucus members can rally behind", adding that Freeland represents a "viable and reassuring alternative" to Trudeau. When asked, Sean Casey said he would like to see Freeland launch a leadership bid.

On December 21, the Ontario Liberal caucus held a virtual meeting where 51 of the province's 75 Liberal MPs came to a consensus that Trudeau should resign. Freeland herself, as an Ontario Liberal MP, was reportedly on that call, but said nothing as the issue was debated. On December 23, the Atlantic Liberal caucus was revealed to be meeting over Trudeau's political future. On December 29, the caucus and its chair, Nova Scotia MP Kody Blois, called on Trudeau to resign. On December 30, the Quebec Liberal caucus called on Trudeau to resign.

=== Opposition parties ===
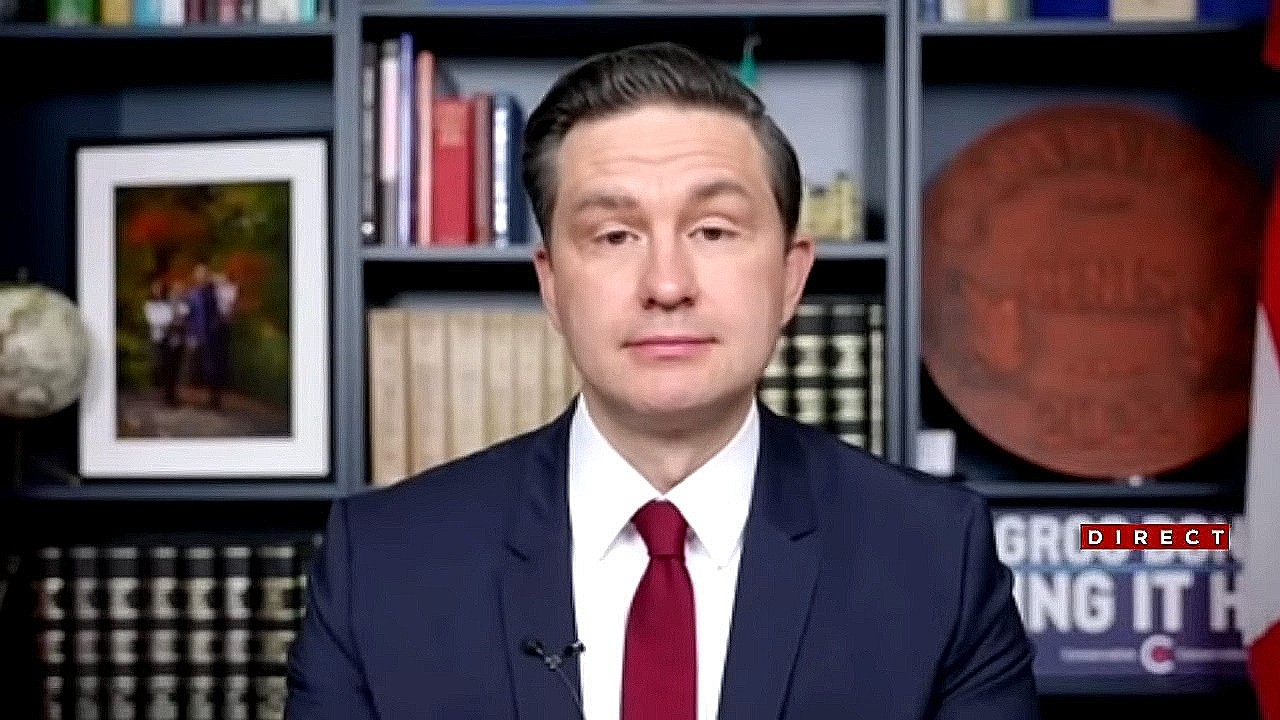
Opposition leader Pierre Poilievre

Opposition leader Pierre Poilievre referenced the reported rift between Trudeau and Freeland the previous week during Question Period on December 10, remarking that Trudeau had "lost control of his own cabinet" and rhetorically asking "which one of [Trudeau and Freeland] is going to win?", while Deputy Opposition Leader and Ontario Conservative MP Melissa Lantsman accused Trudeau of "bullying his female finance minister". Freeland responded by stating that "the only would-be bullies in this House are directly opposite [the Liberal benches]," insisting that she and Trudeau were "united" and denying claims of the rift. After Freeland's resignation, Poilievre claimed Trudeau had "lost control, yet clings to power."

Bloc Québécois leader Yves-François Blanchet, whose party had already voted alongside the Conservatives to oust the Trudeau government in the last of multiple unsuccessful motions of non-confidence, remarked on December 16 that "the Trudeau government is done." Quebec Premier François Legault avoided saying whether he retained confidence in Trudeau following Freeland's resignation, stating it would be "up to the people in the House of Commons to decide how they will vote in the coming weeks, the coming months." He had asked the Bloc Québécois to withdraw support from the Liberal minority government back in September 2024.

NDP leader Jagmeet Singh, whose party had until earlier in 2024 been in a supply-and-confidence arrangement with the Liberal minority government, and even afterward had continued to support the government in confidence votes, said on December 17 that Trudeau's Liberals "are focused on themselves" and that Trudeau "has to go," marking the first time he called for Trudeau's resignation. He nonetheless said that "all options are on the table", when asked whether he would vote no confidence in the government. Subsequently, on December 20, Singh stated that the NDP "will vote to bring this government down" in an open letter posted on X.

Green Party leader Elizabeth May called December 16 an "unprecedented day" in Canadian politics and said she was "shocked by the events of today."

=== Media ===
- The editorial board of the Toronto Star, which had endorsed Trudeau's Liberals in all three elections in which he led them, called for Trudeau's resignation on the evening of December 16.
- Brian Lilley of the Postmedia tabloid Toronto Sun called for Trudeau's resignation on December 16, stating "For the good of your party, the good of your country, the good of the Canadian people, it’s time to leave."

=== Public ===
- In a poll conducted by Abacus Data on the day after Freeland's resignation, 67% of Canadians wanted Trudeau to resign, compared to just 19% who wanted him to stay on as prime minister. While the Liberals dropped one point in nationwide voting intentions from the week prior (from 21% to 20%), the Conservatives, increasing one point to 45%, opened up their largest lead (25 points) since Abacus began tracking voting intentions. The Liberals were just two points ahead of the third-place NDP, at 20% to 18%. 58% of those polled also said that they wanted an immediate election. 338Canada's analysis projection for December 22 saw the Liberals' expected nationwide seat count decrease from 47 to just 39, losing even second place to the Bloc. The site gave the Liberals only a 36% chance of forming the Official Opposition (to the Bloc's 61%).
- In the federal by-election on December 16 (the same day as Chrystia Freeland's resignation), a seat which the Liberals had won by 3 points in 2021, Conservative candidate and former MP for the riding Tamara Jensen won by a decisive 50-point margin, garnering roughly two-thirds of the vote. The Conservative vote total increased 30 points from the previous election, while the Liberal vote total decreased by 23 points and the NDP's by 7.
- Dominique Lapointe, director at Manulife, Canada's largest insurance company, following Freeland's resignation, stated "It certainly adds another layer of uncertainty as we likely enter a period of volatility with the upcoming U.S. administration.”

== Resignation of Justin Trudeau ==
External videos
- " Full speech: Trudeau to resign as Liberal leader" (2025), CBC (7:19min) "transcript"

On January 6, 2025, Justin Trudeau announced he would resign as Liberal leader and Prime Minister of Canada by March 24, 2025, upon the election of a new party leader. In his resignation speech, Trudeau stated that party dissent would prevent him from campaigning effectively in the 2025 federal election. He expressed pride in his government's achievements, including his support for Ukraine during its ongoing conflict and his handling of the COVID-19 pandemic. He also later announced that he would not stand for re-election in Papineau, the riding he had held since 2008.

== Reactions ==
=== Domestic ===
==== Opposition leaders ====
- Official opposition leader Pierre Poilievre of the Conservative Party emphasized his calls for an early federal election, stating that Liberal MPs "want to protect their pensions and paycheques by sweeping their hated leader under the rug months before an election to trick you, and then do it all over again."
- NDP leader Jagmeet Singh stated that "The problem is not just Justin Trudeau. It's every minister that's been calling the shots, it's every Liberal MP that looked down their nose at Canadians who are worried about high costs or crumbling health care."

==== Provincial Premiers ====
- Alberta

Premier Danielle Smith stated "It was one of the most irresponsible and selfish acts of a government in Canadian history" in response to the fact that Justin Trudeau would not call an election and that he had prorogued parliament for his party's leadership election.

- British Columbia

Premier David Eby thanked Trudeau for his service to Canada, saying "We worked on many important issues including partnering to lower the cost of childcare for families." He also said “we must come together to protect Canadian workers and businesses against U.S. tariff threats.”

- Manitoba

Premier Wab Kinew stated “I wanted to thank Prime Minister Justin Trudeau for his service to our country. The prime minister has made his announcement about his future, but there still is going to be work that we are looking to get done with him before he leaves office. And then, of course, we will be prepared to work with whoever is next.”

- New Brunswick

Premier Susan Holt stated "I think it's become clear that the government hasn't been working the way that it should, both in the House of Commons and within the government ranks. It felt like progress had stalled and the ability to move forward wasn't there anymore," also adding,"I think Canadians have expressed that it's time for a refresh, and a reset, and a new direction, so I think this is the right decision for the prime minister to have made."

- Newfoundland and Labrador

Premier Andrew Furey thanked Trudeau for his service to Canadians and to Newfoundlanders and Labradorians. In a post on X, he said "Prime Minister @JustinTrudeau has served with a steady hand through difficult times, like the pandemic. We didn't agree on all policies, but I am proud of the progress we made together on things like affordable child care and rate mitigation. Wishing him well in his next chapter."

- Nova Scotia

Premier Tim Houston stated “I don’t need to agree with someone on every issue to respect the sacrifice it takes to run for public office and serve. Despite our differences, we were able to have frank conversations as we discussed what was best for the people of Nova Scotia.” he also said that he wishes Trudeau "Nothing but the best in whatever comes next."

- Prince Edward Island

Premier Dennis King stated “As Premier, I have had the privilege of working alongside him and his government, setting partisanship aside to advance initiatives that strengthened our communities and supported Island families. Prime Minister Trudeau’s deep love for Canada was evident, and I valued his openness to hearing the perspectives of Canada’s smallest province."

- Ontario

Instead of directly commenting on the situation, Premier Doug Ford said that Canada needed to prepare for U.S. tariffs, stating, "In two weeks, the president-elect will be sworn in as America's next president and will have every opportunity to make his threats real." adding, "Between now and then, the federal government needs to do everything humanly possible to avoid these tariffs, including by doing more to secure our border and offering a credible plan to invest more in Canada's military to meet and exceed our NATO spending commitments."

- Quebec

Premier Francois Legault stated in a post on X "Although our opinions have often differed, today I want to salute [Trudeau's] public service and his commitment to Canada. We have significant challenges ahead of us, particularly with the arrival of Donald Trump on January 20. I will continue to work with Mr. Trudeau, his successor and the current government to avoid these tariffs."

- Saskatchewan

Premier Scott Moe was critical of Trudeau's decision to prorogue parliament, saying “Suspending parliament to take months to settle who will lead the Liberal Party is not giving Canadians the choice they desire or deserve.” He also said that his government was “addressing affordability, engaging on increased market access, investment attraction and continuing to engage with the U.S. on ensuring border security for those that live on either side of the border.” Moe was also critical of the fact that a federal election was not called. Stating, "I reiterate my call for an immediate election so that Canadians may choose who will represent them."

=== Foreign ===
Australia

- Australian prime minister Anthony Albanese called Trudeau "a good friend of Australia", and wished him "the very best in whatever he chooses to do next in his life".

Ireland

- Irish foreign minister Micheál Martin thanked Trudeau for his “significant contribution to the global stage”.

Japan

- Japanese foreign minister Takeshi Iwaya lauded the "tremendous efforts" Trudeau had made to the international rules-based order through Canada's role in the G7. Adding that "I’d like to extend my heartfelt respect [to him]”.

United States

- Outgoing U.S. president Joe Biden praised Trudeau, saying he "led with commitment, optimism and strategic vision", and that he had strengthened the US-Canadian relationship. He added that "The American and Canadian people are safer because of him. And the world is better off because of him."

United States

- U.S. president-elect Donald Trump framed Trudeau's resignation around his proposal to annex Canada to the United States, stating, "Many people in Canada LOVE being the 51st State. The United States can no longer suffer the massive Trade Deficits and Subsidies that Canada needs to stay afloat. Justin Trudeau knew this, and resigned. If Canada merged with the U.S., there would be no Tariffs, taxes would go way down, and they would be TOTALLY SECURE from the threat of the Russian and Chinese Ships that are constantly surrounding them. Together, what a great Nation it would be!!!" He had earlier celebrated Freeland's resignation, stating "Her behavior was totally toxic, and not at all conducive to making deals which are good for the very unhappy citizens of Canada. She will not be missed!!!". A reaction analysts linked to their tense relationship during Trump's first term, particularly during the renegotiation of NAFTA, when Freeland was Minister of Foreign Affairs.

United Kingdom

- British prime minister Keir Starmer wished Trudeau well for his future and highlighted that “Canada and the U.K. have a historic, close relationship and that will continue to grow.”

== Prorogation of Parliament ==
As part of his resignation, Trudeau also announced that Governor General Mary Simon would prorogue Parliament until March 24, 2025. As a result, a revised version of the Online Harms Act, the Electoral Participation Act, and proposed increases to Canada's capital gains tax all died on the order paper, among 22 other government bills.

Two citizens challenged the prorogation in the Federal Court. Citing the decision of the Supreme Court of the United Kingdom in 2019 which held that Prime Minister Boris Johnson's attempted prorogation of the British Parliament was unconstitutional (R (Miller) v The Prime Minister and Cherry v Advocate General for Scotland), they argued that Trudeau's decision to prorogue the Canadian Parliament was equally unconstitutional. On January 18, 2025, the Chief Justice of the Federal Court Paul S. Crampton granted a motion to expedite the hearing timelines to preserve the possibility that a ruling that the prorogation would not be completely moot, and scheduled hearing dates for February 13 and 14, 2025.

On March 6, 2025, the Federal Court dismissed the case. Crampton found that the prorogation decision was justiciable, but declined to adopt Miller II. He ruled that the prime minister does not need to give justification or reasons for their advice to prorogue, unless the case involved transgressions of the Canadian Charter of Rights and Freedoms. The decision to prorogue instead of calling an election was a political choice and not subject to judicial review by the courts. The applicants conceded that Trudeau had the confidence of the House at the time of prorogation. Crampton found that they had failed to prove if and when a motion of no confidence would occur. In any case, Crampton also ruled that the applicants failed to prove that the prorogation was solely for partisan reasons, as Trudeau had publicly cited parliamentary gridlock over the release of privileged documents as a reason.

== Transition to the premiership of Mark Carney ==
The Liberal Party held a leadership race in February and March, with four candidates: Frank Baylis, Carney, Freeland, and Gould. In the vote held on March 9, 2025, Carney won 85.9% of the votes, with Freeland coming second at 8.0%.

Carney, the former governor of the Bank of Canada and former governor of the Bank of England, was sworn in as prime minister by Governor General Mary Simon on March 14, 2025, with a restructured Cabinet. On March 23, 2025, he advised the Governor General to dissolve Parliament, scheduling a snap election for April 28, 2025. Carney later won the election, overturning a large pre-election polling deficit to form a minority government, with 169 out of the 172 seats needed to form a majority government.

== See also ==
- Movements for the annexation of Canada to the United States § Proposals to annex Canada by President Donald Trump
- 2024 German government crisis
- 2022 United Kingdom government crisis
