= Dynasty Gold Corp. =

Canadian mining company

Dynasty Gold Corporation
- Formerly: Lucero Resources
- Traded as: TSX-V: DYG
- Industry: Mining
- Headquarters: Vancouver, Canada
- Key people: Ivy Chong, President & CEO
- Subsidiaries: Terrawest Minerals Inc.
- Website: dynastygoldcorp.com

Dynasty Gold Corp. is a Canadian mining company that operates mainly in Canada and China.

== Description ==
Dynasty Gold Corporation is a gold and silver mining company with headquarters on Granville Street in Vancouver, Canada. The company is led by Ivy Chong, the president and CEO, Larry Kornze is the Vice President of Exploration. Previously, geologist Jonathan George led the company with Stuart Angus as the corporate secretary.

The company is not a member of the Mining Association of Canada.

Terrawest Minerals Inc. is a fully owned subsidiary of Dynasty Gold Corp and operates in the People's Republic of China.

== Activities ==
The company owns the Thundercloud Property, which is located 47 kilometres west of Dryden, Ontario in the central Wabigoon greenstone belt of Ontario, Canada. It also has 70% ownership of the 1,000 square kilometre Hatu gold mine in Tuoli County in Xinjiang, China Dynasty Gold started the gold mine in May 2003.

In 2004 Dynasty Gold was an 80% shareholder of joint ventures in Hami, Xinjiang, the Red Valley project in Qinghai and the Wildhorse project in Gansu. The Red Valley and Woldhorse projects are located on the Qilian metallogenic belt.

The company also owns the Golden Repeat property in Midas, Nevada.

== History ==
Initially the company was called Lucero Resources and operated in gold and copper mining in Chile.

In 2003, the company became one of the first Canadian mining companies to operate in China.

In 2022, the company's Thundercloud property was estimated to hold 182,000 ounces of gold. The company purchased the property from Teck Resources.

The company's Qi2 gold mine in Hatu, China has an estimated 546,000 ounces of gold. Since 2016, the company was engaged in a legal dispute its business partner, the state mining company Xinjiang Non-Ferrous Metals Group.

After not receiving a satisfactory response to 2022 enquiries about the company's possible use of Uyghur forced labour in China, the Canadian Ombudsperson for Responsible Enterprise announced a probe into the company on July 11, 2023. The company had previously been named in a 2020 report by the Australian Strategic Policy Institute, along with Nike Canada, as companies who used Uyghur forced labour. The company claimed that it does not have operational control of the mine.

== See also ==
- Lists of companies listed on the Toronto Stock Exchange
- Persecution of Uyghurs in China
