= 2023 Winnipeg South Centre federal by-election =

Federal by-election in Manitoba, Canada

- June 19, 2023

Riding of Winnipeg South Centre
- Turnout: 36.82%
	First party	Second party	Third party
	LPC	CPC	NDP
Candidate	Ben Carr	Damir Stipanovic	Julia Riddell
Party	Liberal	Conservative	New Democratic
Popular vote	14,278	6,100	3,778
Percentage	55.49%	23.70%	14.68%
Swing	▲9.94%	▼4.11%	▼5.95%
MP before election
Jim Carr
Liberal
Elected MP
Ben Carr
Liberal

A by-election was held in the federal riding of Winnipeg South Centre in Manitoba on June 19, 2023, following the death of Liberal MP and former cabinet minister Jim Carr.

The by-election was held on the same day as three others; Notre-Dame-de-Grâce—Westmount, Oxford and Portage—Lisgar.

== Background ==
=== Constituency ===
The district is an urban constituency based in the city of Winnipeg.

=== Representation ===
Winnipeg South Centre has been a reliable Liberal seat since 1988, apart from 2011 to 2015 when it was held by Conservative Joyce Bateman.

The riding of Winnipeg South Centre was vacated on December 12, 2022 following the death of Liberal MP and former cabinet minister Jim Carr. Carr had represented the riding since 2015, when he defeated Conservative incumbent Joyce Bateman, and had been battling multiple myeloma and kidney failure since 2019. Carr also defeated Bateman in rematches in 2019 and 2021.

== Campaign ==
=== Candidates ===
Jim Carr's son Ben Carr, an educator and former staffer to Mélanie Joly, won the Liberal nomination for the by-election. Winnipeg city councillor Sherri Rollins briefly ran for the nomination before withdrawing and throwing her support behind Carr.

The Conservatives nominated Damir Stipanovic, an air traffic controller and member of the Royal Canadian Air Force Reserve.

After previously running in the same riding in the 2021 federal election, NDP candidate Julia Riddell, a clinical psychologist, and Green candidate Doug Hemmerling, a local educator, won their respective parties' nominations for the by-election.

The People's Party of Canada chose former DJ Tylor Baer to be their candidate. He contested Brandon—Souris for the party in 2021.

The Rhinoceros Party chose party leader Sébastien CoRhino to be their candidate.

The Longest Ballot Committee chose Winnipeg South Centre as its target for this group of by-elections; the group protests first-past-the-post voting by registering large numbers of independent candidates in one riding in an election or group of by-elections. Forty-two people, including the above-mentioned Sébastien CoRhino, ran under its auspices, while Tait Palsson, who was not involved with the group, also ran an independent campaign. The forty-eight candidates in this by-election are the most ever to contest a federal election in Canada.

=== Polling ===
Polling Firm	Last Date of Polling	Link	LPC	CPC	NDP	PPC	GPC	Others	Undecided	Margin of Error^{[1]}	Sample Size^{[2]}	Polling Method^{[3]}
Mainstreet Research	June 14, 2023	HTML	47	28	16	2	2	1	4	±4.7 pp	430	IVR
Mainstreet Research	June 14, 2023	HTML	49	29	16	2	2	1	—N/a	±4.7 pp	430	IVR

== Results ==
Canadian federal by-election, June 19, 2023: Winnipeg South Centre Death of Jim Carr
Party	Candidate	Votes	%	±%
Liberal	Ben Carr	14,278	55.49	+9.94
Conservative	Damir Stipanovic	6,100	23.70	-4.11
New Democratic	Julia Riddell	3,778	14.68	-5.95
Green	Doug Hemmerling	698	2.71	-0.04
People's	Tylor Baer	324	1.26	-1.51
Rhinoceros	Sébastien CoRhino	55	0.21	
Independent	Tait Palsson	52	0.20	
Independent	Jevin David Carroll	36	0.14	
Independent	John Dale	29	0.11	
Independent	Glen MacDonald	27	0.10	
Independent	Connie Lukawski	24	0.09	
Independent	Paul Stewart	22	0.09	
Independent	Patrick Strzalkowski	19	0.07	
Independent	Mark Dejewski	18	0.07	
Independent	Stella Galas	16	0.06	
Independent	Demetrios Karavas	16	0.06	
Independent	Myriam Beaulieu	14	0.05	
Independent	Christopher Clacio	14	0.05	
Independent	Alain Bourgault	13	0.05	
Independent	Martin "Acetaria Caesar" Jubinville	13	0.05	
Independent	Krzysztof Krzywinski	13	0.05	
Independent	Alain Lamontagne	11	0.04	
Independent	Marie-Hélène LeBel	11	0.04	
Independent	Jordan Wong	11	0.04	
Independent	Line Bélanger	10	0.04	
Independent	Andrew Kozakewich	10	0.04	
Independent	Eliana Rosenblum	10	0.04	
Independent	Gerrit Dogger	9	0.03	
Independent	Julie St-Amand	9	0.03	
Independent	Alexandra Engering	8	0.03	
Independent	Anthony Hamel	8	0.03	
Independent	Darcy Justin Vanderwater	8	0.03	
Independent	Roger Sherwood	7	0.03	
Independent	Pascal St-Amand	7	0.03	
Independent	Dji-Pé Frazer	6	0.02	
Independent	Daniel Gagnon	6	0.02	
Independent	Spencer Rocchi	6	0.02	
Independent	Mário Stocco	6	0.02	
Independent	Manon Marie Lili Desbiens	5	0.02	
Independent	Ysack Émile Dupont	5	0.02	
Independent	Yusuf Nasihi	5	0.02	
Independent	Jaël Champagne Gareau	4	0.02	
Independent	Donovan Eckstrom	3	0.01	
Independent	Ryan Huard	2	0.01	
Independent	Lorant Polya	2	0.01	
Independent	Benjamin Teichman	2	0.01	
Independent	Gavin Vanderwater	2	0.01	
Independent	Saleh Waziruddin	1	0.00	
Total valid votes		25,733	99.52	
Total rejected ballots		125	0.48	-0.26
Turnout		25,858	36.82	-32.79
Eligible voters		70,230		
Liberal hold		Swing		+7.02
Source: Elections Canada

== 2021 result ==
2021 Canadian federal election: Winnipeg South Centre
Party	Candidate	Votes	%	±%	Expenditures
Liberal	Jim Carr	22,214	45.55	+0.54	$84,273.45
Conservative	Joyce Bateman	13,566	27.82	−1.89	$83,919.18
New Democratic	Julia Riddell	10,064	20.64	+2.94	$12,522.59
People's	Chase Wells	1,352	2.77	+1.65	$1,885.74
Green	Douglas Hemmerling	1,341	2.75	−3.51	$21,799.84
Communist	Cam Scott	234	0.48	N/A	N/A
Total valid votes/expense limit		48,771	99.26		$106,382.19
Total rejected ballots		364	0.74	+0.22	
Turnout		49,135	69.60	-1.37	
Eligible voters		70,592			
Liberal hold		Swing		+1.22	
Source: Elections Canada
