= Jim Carr =

Canadian politician (1951–2022)

The Honourable Jim Carr PC OM
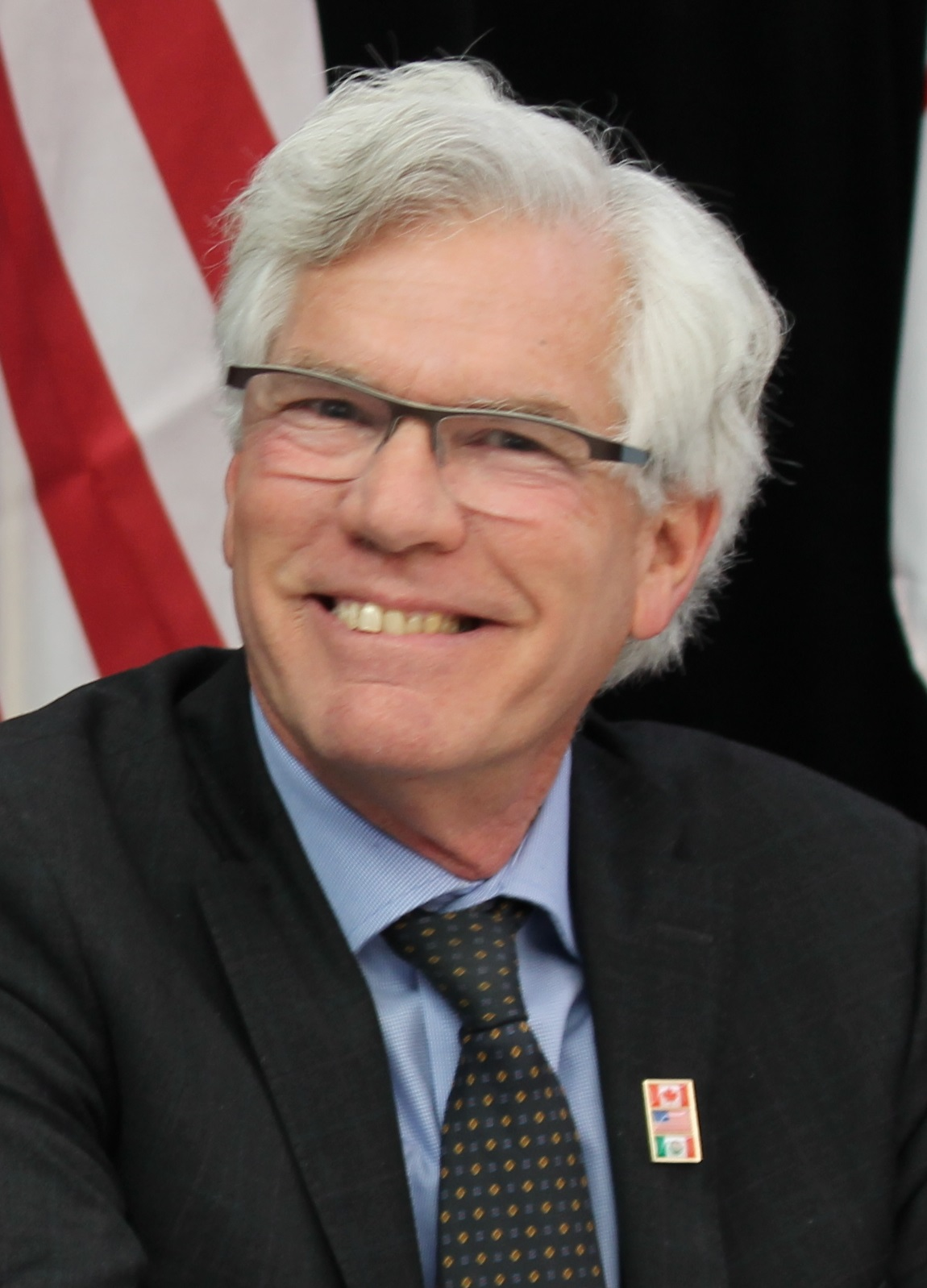
- Carr in 2016

Chair of the Standing Committee on Public Safety and National Security
- In office December 8, 2021 – September 29, 2022
- Preceded by: John McKay
- Succeeded by: Ron McKinnon

Minister without Portfolio
- In office January 12, 2021 – October 26, 2021
- Prime Minister: Justin Trudeau

Special Representative for the Prairies
- In office November 20, 2019 – October 26, 2021
- Prime Minister: Justin Trudeau
- Preceded by: Office established
- Succeeded by: Office abolished

Minister of International Trade Diversification
- In office July 18, 2018 – November 20, 2019
- Prime Minister: Justin Trudeau
- Preceded by: François-Philippe Champagne
- Succeeded by: Mary Ng (Minister of Small Business, Export Promotion and International Trade)

Minister of Natural Resources
- In office November 4, 2015 – July 18, 2018
- Prime Minister: Justin Trudeau
- Preceded by: Greg Rickford
- Succeeded by: Amarjeet Sohi

Member of Parliament for Winnipeg South Centre
- In office October 19, 2015 – December 12, 2022
- Preceded by: Joyce Bateman
- Succeeded by: Ben Carr

Deputy Leader of the Manitoba Liberal Party
- In office April 26, 1988 – January 27, 1992
- Leader: Sharon Carstairs

Member of the Manitoba Legislative Assembly for Crescentwood
- In office September 11, 1990 – January 27, 1992
- Preceded by: Warren Steen
- Succeeded by: Avis Gray

Member of the Manitoba Legislative Assembly for Fort Rouge
- In office April 26, 1988 – September 11, 1990
- Preceded by: Roland Penner
- Succeeded by: Tim Sale

Personal details
- Born: James Gordon Carr; October 11, 1951 Winnipeg, Manitoba, Canada
- Died: December 12, 2022 (aged 71) Winnipeg, Manitoba, Canada
- Party: Liberal
- Children: Ben Carr
- Education: McGill University
- Occupation: Politician; businessman; writer; editor

James Gordon Carr PC OM (October 11, 1951 – December 12, 2022) was a Canadian politician, cabinet minister, journalist, and professional oboist. A member of the Liberal Party, he served as the member of Parliament for Winnipeg South Centre from 2015 until his death on December 12, 2022. Carr died days after his Private Members Bill, Bill C-235, An Act respecting the building of a green economy in the Prairies, passed the House and went to the Senate. He last served as the Chair of the Standing Committee on Public Safety and National Security, until his resignation on September 29, 2022.

Carr previously served as the Minister of Natural Resources from 2015 to 2018 and Minister of International Trade Diversification from 2018 to 2019. He left Cabinet in 2019 after being diagnosed with cancer, but soon after was named the Special Representative for the Prairies. In 2021, he returned to Cabinet to concurrently serve as a Minister without Portfolio and the Special Representative for the Prairies. He previously was a member of the Manitoba Legislature from 1988 to 1992 for the Manitoba Liberal Party.

== Biography ==
Carr was born on October 11, 1951, in Winnipeg, Manitoba, the son of Esther (Golden) and David Carr. He graduated from University of Winnipeg Collegiate, and played the oboe for the Winnipeg Symphony Orchestra from ages 16 to 21. Carr was awarded a Canada Council arts grant to study for a year under Marc Lifschey, who was then the primary oboist for the San Francisco Symphony Orchestra. While he was there, he unsuccessfully auditioned for first oboist at the Los Angeles Philharmonic. After returning to Winnipeg, Carr gave up music as a career, and did not play the oboe again until picking it up again for political fundraising events.

Carr started his post-secondary education at the University of British Columbia, but transferred to McGill University because his interest in politics was piqued by the Parti Québécois victory in the 1976 Quebec general election. Carr graduated from McGill in 1979 with a Bachelor of Arts degree with a joint honours in history and political science.

After graduation, Carr worked in Winnipeg as a staffer on the Manitoba government's cultural policy review, and worked as a journalist in the early 1980s. On June 3, 1969, Carr and four other Young Liberals joined the New Democratic Party of Manitoba so as to support Sidney Green's unsuccessful bid to lead the party. He later returned to the Liberals. Before entering public life, he was also executive director of the Manitoba Arts Council.

=== Provincial politics ===
Carr first ran for the Manitoba legislature in the provincial election of 1986, losing to Progressive Conservative leader Gary Filmon in the upscale west Winnipeg riding of Tuxedo. He ran again in the provincial election of 1988 during a period of increased support for the provincial Liberals, and scored a surprisingly strong victory in the riding of Fort Rouge, defeating NDP cabinet minister Roland Penner by over 2,000 votes. The Progressive Conservatives formed a minority government after this election, and Carr became Deputy Leader of the official opposition party.

Following redistribution, Carr sought re-election in the 1990 provincial election in the riding of Crescentwood, where he defeated Progressive Conservative Tom DeNardi by 1,310 votes. The Liberals fell from twenty seats to seven in this election; Carr resigned his seat in February 1992.

=== Post-provincial politics ===
After resigning his seat in 1992, Carr worked as a columnist and was on the editorial board for the Winnipeg Free Press. In 1998, he left and became president and CEO of the Business Council of Manitoba, an organization which he co-founded and stayed with until 2015. In 2006, he advocated for the province to reduce its health costs, and to not exclude the option of privatization. "Everything is worth studying, and it's studied everywhere around the world. There are advances that have been made in other places, with cultures similar to our own, that could be applied here," said Carr. In this role, he also participated in the Winnipeg Consensus, which began with an unprecedented meeting held in October 2009, bringing together diverse organizations who agreed a national dialogue and a Canadian Clean Energy Strategy was needed on the role of energy in Canada's environmental and economic future. In his role as the President of the Business Council of Manitoba, Carr also advocated for a temporary increase to the PST by 1% to assist municipalities with their infrastructure deficits.

Carr was also a board member on the Canada West Foundation and the Winnipeg Airports Authority, as well as vice-president of the Performing Arts Consortium of Winnipeg, and a director of the Manitoba Arts Stabilization Fund. Carr has also been active in the Canadian Jewish Congress.

In July 2011, Carr was awarded the Order of Manitoba.

=== Federal politics ===
In January 2014, Carr was announced as a candidate for the Liberal nomination in the federal riding of Winnipeg South Centre. He went on to win the nomination meeting and was declared the Liberal candidate for the 2015 federal election. He won the subsequent election on October 19, 2015, with 59.7 per cent of the vote. Two weeks later on November 4, 2015, Carr was officially sworn into the cabinet as Minister of Natural Resources.

==== Minister of Natural Resources ====
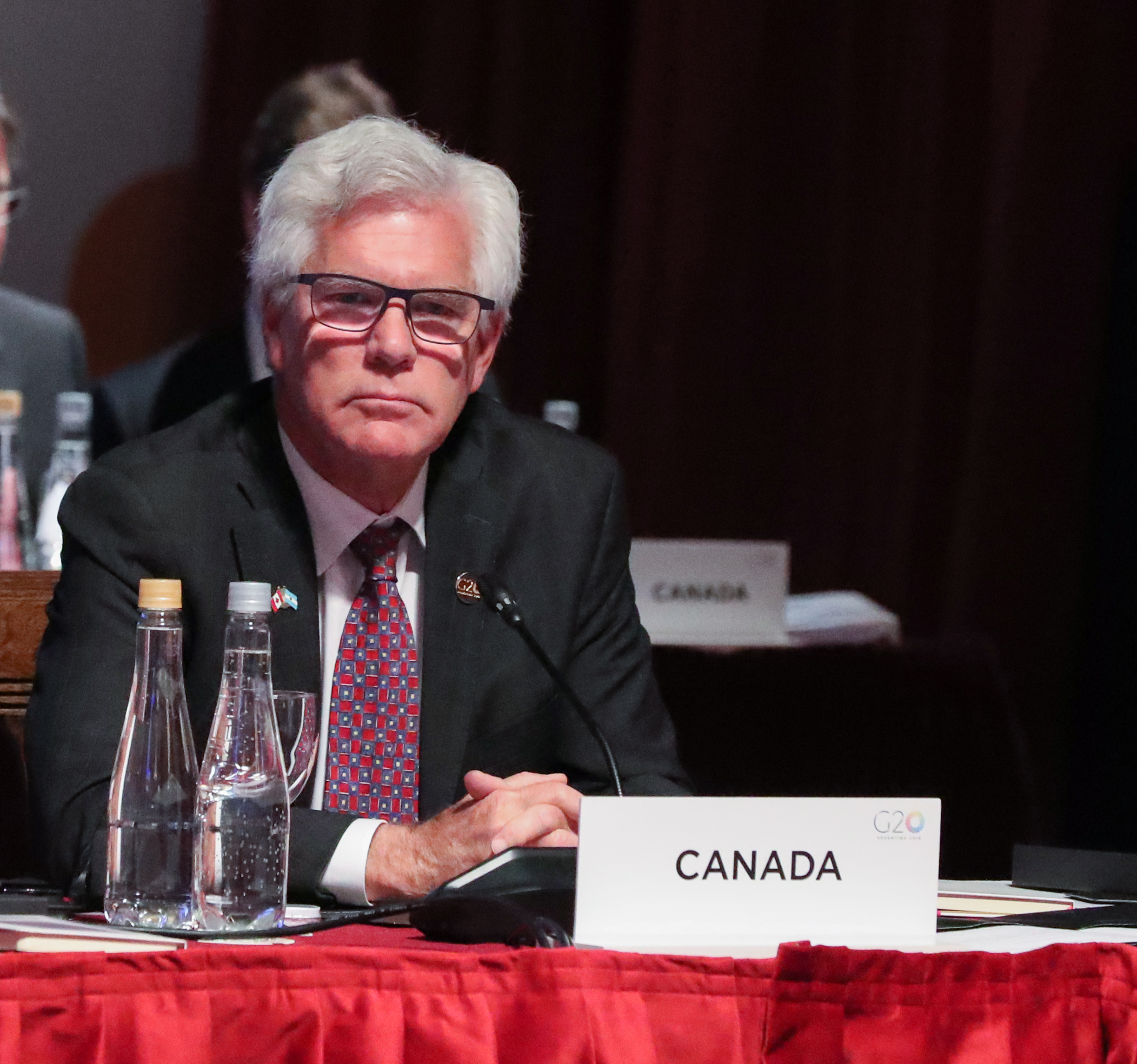
Carr at the 2018 G20 summit in Argentina.

Carr's earlier work on the Winnipeg Consensus formed the basis for Generation Energy, his signature initiative as Minister of Natural Resources, launched in April 2017. This began a national dialogue on Canada's energy future aimed at finding out how Canadians want to meet Canada's climate goals, create jobs and keep energy affordable. More than 380,000 people engaged in the dialogue through online platforms and in-person roundtables, including the Generation Energy Conference held in Winnipeg with more than 650 participants from across Canada and around the world. The ideas that came from the dialogue resulted in billions of dollars of investments in electric vehicles and alternative fuels, smart grids, clean energy solutions for rural and remote communities, energy efficient buildings and emerging renewable power solutions.

Carr worked closely with the Minister of Environment and Climate Change, Catherine McKenna, to develop the Pan-Canadian Framework on Clean Growth and Climate Change (PCF). He oversaw the efforts of his department to implement 30 of the 50 identified actions under the PCF, including many of the aforementioned investments.

In this role, Carr also represented Canada at the June 2016 Clean Energy Ministerial and Mission Innovation, where he announced that the federal government will "double its spending on clean-energy research to $775-million by 2020, and look for ways to boost the commercialization of the emerging technology." Carr then laid the groundwork for Canada to host the Clean Energy Ministerial/Mission Innovation in Vancouver in May 2019, which showcased Canada's efforts to boost women in energy, indigenous clean energy entrepreneurship and launch Canada's Energy Vision based on the results of the Generation Energy initiative.

On February 11, 2016, as Natural Resources Minister, Carr purchased seven tickets to an NHL game featuring the Winnipeg Jets versus the Boston Bruins. His guests included the energy ministers and ambassadors from the United States and Mexico. It was later revealed Carr expensed $1,258.25 for the tickets and $525.30 for limo transportation from the Fort Garry Hotel to Winnipeg's MTS Centre arena. A spokesperson for Carr's office stated that the spending was in line with treasury board directives on hospitality and provided an opportunity for discussions in advance of an energy summit the following day.

==== Minister of International Trade Diversification ====
On July 18, 2018, Carr was shuffled from Minister of Natural Resources to the newly created position of Minister of International Trade Diversification. The addition of the word diversification to the title signaled a new foreign policy focus on diversifying Canada's trade partners beyond the United States. It also furthered the work of his predecessor in welcoming more inclusive trade, where more Canadians are encouraged to participate in international trade and investment, including owners of small and medium enterprises (SMEs) and businesses owned by often underrepresented Canadians, such as women, Indigenous peoples, youth and those who identify as LGBTQ2. In a November 2018 speech at the Toronto Region Board of Trade, Carr described the reason for the focus on diversifying those represented in Canada's international trade: "The more Canadians we have taking advantage of trade, the more wealth we can create here at home. Diversification is a national imperative. Trade diversification is a critical plank to our competitiveness."

In this role, Carr oversaw the expansion of Canada's Trade Commissioner Service (TCS), which helps Canadian businesses find customers in other countries. The Fall 2018 Economic Statement dedicated $1.2 billion towards the Trade Diversification Strategy, helping Canadians export around the globe. This included $290 million over five years towards the TCS and a $100 million expansion of the CanExport program, which supports Canadian entrepreneurs looking to export.

This led to broadening opportunities for Canadian businesses to reach the 500 million consumers in European markets under the Canada-European Union Comprehensive Economic and Trade Agreement (CETA), with the addition of 11 new trade commissioners across the EU, including enhanced presence in Milan.

In Canada, Carr announced the reopening of the TCS regional hub office in Winnipeg, which serves Canadian exporters in Manitoba and Saskatchewan.

Carr oversaw initiatives to help close socio-economic gaps and create a trade environment where more Canadians can participate, including:

- Leading the first-ever government-led LGBTQ2 trade mission, at the NGLCC International Business Leadership Conference in Philadelphia in August 2018
- Expanding TCS resources across Canada to help connect Indigenous exporters to business opportunities abroad
- Delivering on a commitment to conduct a Gender-based Analysis Plus (GBA+) as part of discussions towards a free trade agreement with Mercosur, marking "the first time such an analysis has been conducted on an ongoing free trade negotiation anywhere in the world"

In his time as Minister of International Trade Diversification, Carr welcomed the entry into force of one multilateral (CPTPP) and two bilateral (Chile and Israel) free trade agreements. The Canada-USA-Mexico agreement negotiations were concluded by the Minister of Foreign Affairs, Chrystia Freeland. Under Carr, negotiations continued with three other trading blocs: Mercosur, ASEAN and the Pacific Alliance.

===== Comprehensive and Progressive Agreement for Trans-Pacific Partnership (CPTPP) =====
Soon after he was sworn in, Carr picked up the Comprehensive and Progressive Agreement for Trans-Pacific Partnership (CPTPP) file. Moving swiftly to ensure early preferential access for Canadian businesses, Carr and the federal government made the ratification of CPTPP in Canada a top priority, moving it though parliament in record time. Implementing legislation for the CPTPP, Bill C-79, was introduced for debate in the House of Commons by his predecessor on June 14, 2018. Carr introduced its second reading three months later, on September 17. Bill C-79 received royal assent on October 25 and Carr announced four days later that Canada was officially the 5th CPTPP country to ratify the agreement. In Carr's words, the CPTPP legislation was introduced and moved "with a speed reflecting the importance of the CPTPP to farmers, ranchers, entrepreneurs and workers across Canada."

By becoming one of the first six countries to ratify the agreement, Canada joined Australia, Japan, Mexico, New Zealand and Singapore in bringing the agreement into force on December 30, 2018. He attended the inaugural meeting of the CPTPP commission on January 19, 2019, in Tokyo, Japan. Carr and his predecessor, Francois-Philippe Champagne, marked the entry into force of the CPTPP with business owners and exporters at the Port of Vancouver on February 11, 2019. With the implementation of the CPTPP, and therefore free trade with Japan, Canada then became the only G7 country with trade agreements with all six other G7 partners.

===== Canada-Chile Free Trade Agreement (CCFTA) =====
On February 4, 2019, Carr met with Chilean Minister of Foreign Affairs Roberto Ampuero to mark the entry into force of the modernized Canada-Chile Free Trade Agreement (CCFTA). The CCFTA was updated from its 1997 version, and is notable for making Canada the first G20 country to have a free trade agreement with a chapter on trade and gender. In welcoming the modernization, Carr said: "This milestone agreement will help further encourage trade between Canada and Chile, by stimulating investment and creating new jobs. It has been modernized to reflect the Canadian economy of today, including the dynamic leadership that women continue to demonstrate as entrepreneurs and innovators."

===== Canada-Israel Free Trade Agreement (CIFTA) =====
In the spring of 2019, the modernized Canada-Israel Free Trade Agreement (CIFTA) received royal assent, and Carr welcomed its entry into force on September 1, 2019. CIFTA became the second Canadian free trade agreement to include a chapter on gender, and implemented additional components aimed at "creating conditions for trade where more people can participate and benefit from the wealth it creates. This means including more small and medium-sized businesses, defending workers' rights, encouraging the participation of women-owned businesses and protecting the environment."

===== International Education Strategy =====
International education also falls under the purview of the Minister of International Trade Diversification. Carr unveiled Canada's new International Education Strategy on August 22, 2019. It encourages more young Canadians to study and work abroad, including financial support for 11,000 students over five years through the Outbound Mobility Program pilot project, to be delivered by Colleges and Institutes Canada and Universities Canada.

===== Corporate social responsibility =====
In the area of corporate responsibility, Carr announced the appointment of Sheri Meyerhoffer as Canada's first Canadian Ombudsperson for Responsible Enterprise (CORE) on April 8, 2019. Meyerhoffer's mandate, described as a world first, is to "review allegations of human rights abuses arising from the operations of Canadian companies abroad" and to make recommendations. Her role focuses on the mining, garment, oil and gas sectors. According to the news release, "companies that do not cooperate could face trade measures, including the withdrawal of trade advocacy services and future Export Development Canada support."

==== Second term ====
Carr was re-elected to a second term as Member for Winnipeg South Centre in the 2019 federal election, winning 45% of the vote in a rematch with Joyce Bateman.

The day after his election, Carr was diagnosed with multiple myeloma. He stepped down from Cabinet to fight it, but accepted a role as federal government's special representative to the Prairies. Carr described the role as being "the prime minister's eyes and ears and voice in Manitoba, Saskatchewan and Alberta". On January 12, 2021, Carr returned to cabinet as minister without portfolio while keeping his special representative role. Carr is the first Minister without Portfolio in the Canadian Cabinet since 1978, a position last appointed by Pierre Trudeau.

==== Third term ====
Carr was re-elected to a third term as Member for Winnipeg South Centre in the 2021 federal election. Following his re-election, Carr was not re-appointed to Cabinet. Instead, he was appointed Chair of the Standing Committee on Public Safety and National Security and the subcommittee on that committee's agenda and procedure until his resignation from those roles in September 2022.

Carr's Private Member's Bill, Bill C-235, An Act respecting the building of a green economy in the Prairies, was a major focus of his third term. In his final speech in the House before his death, regarding his Bill C-235, Carr said "I love every square metre of this country in English, en Francais, in Indigenous languages — I wish I spoke more of them — in the language of the newly arrived and all that represents to Canada and Canadians." Carr witnessed the successful vote on his Bill, just days before his death.

== Personal life and death ==
Carr was Jewish. He was a descendant of Jewish immigrants who arrived from Russia in 1906. He had his bar mitzvah at Shaarey Zedek Synagogue in 1964.

On October 25, 2019, Carr issued a statement about having felt flu-like symptoms during the campaign. Blood tests revealed shortly afterward that he had multiple myeloma, a blood cancer. He said that he would commence chemotherapy and dialysis treatment whilst remaining in the House of Commons. Carr died of cancer at home in Winnipeg, on December 12, 2022. He was 71.

His son Ben Carr is an educator, a former staffer to Mélanie Joly, and succeeded him as the Member for Winnipeg South Centre in a by-election in 2023.

== Electoral record ==
=== Federal ===
2021 Canadian federal election: Winnipeg South Centre
Party	Candidate	Votes	%	±%	Expenditures
Liberal	Jim Carr	22,214	45.55	+0.54	$84,273.45
Conservative	Joyce Bateman	13,566	27.82	−1.89	$83,919.18
New Democratic	Julia Riddell	10,064	20.64	+2.94	$12,522.59
People's	Chase Wells	1,352	2.77	+1.65	$1,885.74
Green	Douglas Hemmerling	1,341	2.75	−3.51	$21,799.84
Communist	Cam Scott	234	0.48	N/A	N/A
Total valid votes/expense limit		48,771	99.26		$106,382.19
Total rejected ballots		364	0.74	+0.22	
Turnout		49,135	69.60	-1.37	
Eligible voters		70,592			
Liberal hold		Swing		+1.22	
Source: Elections Canada

2019 Canadian federal election: Winnipeg South Centre
Party	Candidate	Votes	%	±%	Expenditures
Liberal	Jim Carr	22,799	45.00	−14.72	$83,512.07
Conservative	Joyce Bateman	15,051	29.71	+1.52	$37,521.63
New Democratic	Elizabeth Shearer	8,965	17.70	+8.74	$8,170.86
Green	James Beddome	3,173	6.26	+3.13	$3,211.69
People's	Jane MacDiarmid	569	1.12	–	$7,017.57
Christian Heritage	Linda Marynuk	104	0.21	–	none listed
Total valid votes/expense limit		50,661	99.48		
Total rejected ballots		267	0.52	+0.17	
Turnout		50,928	70.97	-5.30	
Eligible voters		71,760			
Liberal hold		Swing		−8.12	
Source: Elections Canada

2015 Canadian federal election: Winnipeg South Centre
Party	Candidate	Votes	%	±%	Expenditures
Liberal	Jim Carr	31,993	59.72	+23.13	$138,860.30
Conservative	Joyce Bateman	15,102	28.19	−12.96	$92,738.43
New Democratic	Matt Henderson	4,799	8.96	−9.39	$29,074.48
Green	Andrew Park	1,677	3.13	−0.09	$26,901.85
Total valid votes/expense limit		53,571	99.65		$203,341.22
Total rejected ballots		188	0.35	–	
Turnout		53,759	76.27	–	
Eligible voters		70,487			
Liberal gain from Conservative		Swing		+18.05	
Source: Elections Canada

=== Provincial ===
1990 Manitoba general election: Crescentwood
Party	Candidate	Votes	%	±%
Liberal	Jim Carr	4,588	45.65	16.08
Progressive Conservative	Tom DeNardi	3,278	32.62	-2.99
New Democratic	Neil Cohen	2,184	21.73	-13.09
Total valid votes		10,050	–	–
Rejected		35	–	
Eligible voters / turnout		14,054	71.76	-8.23
Source(s) Source: Manitoba. Chief Electoral Officer (1999). Statement of Votes for the 37th Provincial General Election, September 21, 1999 (PDF) (Report). Winnipeg: Elections Manitoba.

1988 Manitoba general election: Fort Rouge
Party	Candidate	Votes	%	±%
Liberal	Jim Carr	5,127	48.91	29.44
New Democratic	Roland Penner	2,912	27.78	-21.08
Progressive Conservative	Robert Haier	2,303	21.97	-8.00
Progressive	Gordon Pratt	75	0.72	–
Libertarian	Dennis Owens	66	0.63	-0.54
Total valid votes		10,483	–	–
Rejected		50	–	
Eligible voters / turnout		15,057	69.95	5.62
Liberal gain from New Democratic		Swing		+25.22
Source(s) Source: Manitoba. Chief Electoral Officer (1999). Statement of Votes for the 37th Provincial General Election, September 21, 1999 (PDF) (Report). Winnipeg: Elections Manitoba.

1986 Manitoba general election: Tuxedo
Party	Candidate	Votes	%	±%
Progressive Conservative	Gary Filmon	5,268	49.08	-15.51
Liberal	Jim Carr	3,544	33.02	+20.96
New Democratic	Bill Armstrong	1,816	16.92	-6.42
Progressive	David Pearlman	104	0.97	–
Turnout		10,744	71.84	
Progressive Conservative hold		Swing		-18.24
Source: Elections Manitoba

29th Canadian Ministry (2015–2025) – Cabinet of Justin Trudeau
Cabinet posts (3)
Predecessor	Office	Successor
Gilles Lamontagne (1978)	Minister Without Portfolio; January 12, 2021; December 12, 2022	Vacant
François-Philippe Champagne	Minister of International Trade Diversification; July 18, 2018 – November 20, 2019; Mary Ng	Vacant
Greg Rickford	Minister of Natural Resources; November 4, 2015 – July 18, 2018	Amarjeet Sohi
