= Betty Granger =

Betty Granger is a former school trustee in Winnipeg, Manitoba, Canada who provoked controversy during the 2000 federal election with her comments about Asian immigration to Canada, initiating a national political debate. She later became a campaign organizer for Stephen Harper.

== School trustee ==
Granger was 57 years old at the time of the 2000 election, and had served for almost ten years as a school trustee. She was already known as a prominent figure in Winnipeg, and had taken part in a civic-action protest against plans to restructure traffic policies for the River Heights region in 1994. Granger and others argued that the city's plans would lead to congestion and create chaos for local businesses.

During her time on the Winnipeg school board, Granger was criticized on two separate occasions for allegedly making insensitive remarks about homosexuals and racial minorities. Though, Granger disputed the accusations in both instances.

In 1993, fellow Winnipeg school trustee Bill Sanderson accused her of "intimating that all aboriginal peoples are thieves" following a private conversation. Sanderson, who is aboriginal, had informed Granger that he had purchased a computer from his nephew; Granger responded by saying that it was likely stolen. Granger responded to the controversy by saying she had done nothing to offend, and demanded that Sanderson apologize for his accusation.

In 1996, the Winnipeg Free Press quoted Granger as saying that students in one particular class were probably performing poorly because they believed their teacher to be gay. She was quoted as saying, "This man is a flamboyant homosexual. He's so effeminate, [students are] put off. The first day of school, this fellow showed up in a bright pink muscle shirt." Granger denied making this statement. At a subsequent closed-session meeting of the school board, she moved a motion reaffirming the board's commitment to human rights and non-discrimination.

== 2000 campaign ==
A similar controversy arose during the 2000 campaign, although with larger implications. Granger, running in the riding of Winnipeg South Centre as the candidate of the conservative Canadian Alliance party, was widely criticized for remarks that she made to University of Winnipeg students concerning an "Asian invasion". She was quoted as saying, "Canadian students can't get into some of our university programs in Vancouver and Victoria" because of an influx of Asian students, and made reference to "a well-monied population buying up blocks and blocks of real estate" in British Columbia. Concerning a recent influx of refugees from Hong Kong, she was quoted as saying, "There was a realization that what was coming off these boats was not the best clientele you would want for this country." She also claimed that some immigrants supported "Tamil terrorists".

Granger later offered a formal apology, saying, "I apologize for my remarks and any misunderstandings made at the University of Winnipeg. I am on record for increased immigration into Manitoba and my community". Granger suspended her campaign shortly after making the comments, although her name remained on the ballot. She also claimed she had been pressured to withdraw by the office of party leader Stockwell Day, Manitoba campaign chair Clayton Manness and others.

She received 3,210 votes (8.53%) in the election, finishing fourth behind the winner, Liberal candidate Anita Neville. After the election, she was censured by the Winnipeg School Board for her comments. Granger herself voted for the censure motion, and acknowledged that her comments had offended some people. She also expressed regret that some people had congratulated her for her remarks.

Her brother, former Libertarian Party candidate Dennis Owens, later claimed that Granger's remarks had been taken out of context, and noted that most of her speech had addressed the need for more immigration to Canada.

== Aftermath ==
In the immediate aftermath to the 2000 controversy, Granger announced that she would not seek re-election to the Winnipeg school board in 2002. She later reconsidered and declared herself a candidate for re-election. She was defeated, finishing sixth in a district which elected three board members. In 2004, she was appointed by the Winnipeg School Board for a two-year term on a committee overseeing the Children's Heritage Fund.

Granger was hired as a campaign organizer for Stephen Harper in 2002, as Harper successfully challenged Stockwell Day for the leadership of the Canadian Alliance. Granger's role as president of a party Riding association was defended by Harper, who stated that Granger had been the victim of a "slur story" in the 2000 election: "Betty Granger is a riding president, a member in good standing. She's somebody that other members I've talked to think very highly of, and quite frankly, she was the victim of an unfair slur story in the last election campaign."
