= Electoral Participation Act =

Canadian federal legislation

Parliament of Canada
- Long title: An Act to amend the Canada Elections Act
- Considered by: House of Commons of Canada
- Passed: Pending
- Considered by: Senate of Canada

Legislative history

Initiating chamber: House of Commons of Canada
- Bill title: Bill C-65
- Introduced by: Minister of Public Safety, Democratic Institutions and Intergovernmental Affairs Dominic LeBlanc
- Committee responsible: Procedure and House Affairs
- First reading: March 20, 2024
- Second reading: June 19, 2024
- Voting summary: 170 voted for; 148 voted against

Amends
- Canada Elections Act
- Status: Not passed

The Electoral Participation Act (French: Loi sur la participation électorale), commonly known as Bill C-65, was a bill introduced on March 20, 2024, by Minister of Public Safety, Democratic Institutions and Intergovernmental Affairs Dominic LeBlanc during the first session of the 44th Canadian Parliament.

On January 6, 2025, the Parliament of Canada was prorogued by Prime Minister Justin Trudeau, which resulted in the bill dying on the order paper.

== Provisions ==
=== Campaign finance ===
The Bill proposed additional regulatory requirements related to contributions that were difficult to trace. Political parties, candidates and a range of other participants in the electoral system would have been prohibited from accepting contributions in the form of a cryptoasset, money order or prepaid payment product, such as a prepaid credit card.

The Bill would have required third parties to Elections Canada the name and address of any contributor of more than $200 whose funds were used for partisan activities, partisan advertising, election advertising and election surveys in the election and pre-election periods.

In addition, third parties that received contributions would have been required to use only contributions from Canadian individuals for regulated expenses, such as partisan and elections advertising.

=== Election participation ===
The Bill would have amendeded the Canada Election Act with a view to encourage and support voter participation. Two additional days of advance polling would have been authorized, as well as increased flexibility for holding advance polling in remote, isolated communities with smaller populations.

In addition, the Chief Electoral Officer would have been explicitly authorized to establish offices for voting by special ballot in post-secondary educational institutions. The Bill would also have broadened the circumstances in which an elector could vote at a polling station in their electoral district other than the polling station associated with their name on the list of electors

=== Political candidates ===
The Bill would have eased requirements that must be met for political candidates to be nominated to run for election. The general requirement to obtain at least 100 names, addresses and signatures of electors consenting to a candidacy would have been reduced to 75

=== Foreign influence ===
The ban on foreign persons and entities unduly influencing electors to vote or refrain from voting for a particular candidate or party would have been extended to apply at all times, rather than only during the election period. The prohibition on selling advertising space to foreigners or foreign entities for election advertising messages would have been expanded to include the sale of advertising space for partisan advertising messages and would have applied outside of the election period.

The Commissioner of Canada Elections would have been able to hold accountable individuals who counsel others to commit an election offence, even where the offence or contravention is not committed.

=== Election date ===
The bill proposed moving the fixed election date of the 45th Canadian federal election from October 20, 2025, to October 27, 2025. According to the federal government the election date move was intended to avoid the federal election coinciding with Diwali, and the 2025 Alberta municipal elections.

This change also impacted pensions for some members of Parliament, as MPs need at least six years of service to qualify for a parliamentary retirement pension. The one-week delay in the election date means that 80 MPs first elected in the 2019 Canadian federal election (held on October 21, 2019) would have reached this six-year mark and qualified for the pension. The official opposition Conservatives argued that the pension eligibility was the real motivation for the change, an accusation which the government denied.

Of the 80 MPs who would have become eligible for a pension if the election date had been moved later: 32 were Conservatives, 22 were Liberals, 19 were Bloc Québécois, 6 were New Democrats, and 1 was an independent.

On May 31, 2024, NDP MP Lisa Marie Barron stated that the NDP would move an amendment at committee stage to remove the fixed election date change from the bill.

== See also ==
- 45th Canadian federal election
- Fixed election dates in Canada
