= Extractive Sector CSR Counsellor =

Canadian official

The Office of the Extractive Sector CSR Counsellor (French: Bureau du conseiller en responsabilité sociale des entreprises (RSE) was established in 2009 as part of the Government of Canada’s CSR Strategy for the International Extractive Sector. The mandate of the Counsellor is defined by an Order in Council.

Marketa Evans held the position until she resigned in October 2013. In March 2015, Jeffrey Davidson was appointed as Counsellor. Some commentators have argued that as competent as Jeffrey Davidson may be, the government has not given him the tools necessary to be an effective regulator of the extractive sector.

The Counsellor was replaced by the Canadian Ombudsperson for Responsible Enterprise in 2019.

== Mandate ==
CSR Counsellor Mandate

The role of the Counsellor is to review the corporate social responsibility (CSR) practices of Canadian extractive sector companies operating outside Canada; and advise stakeholders on the implementation of endorsed CSR performance guidelines. The Order in Council mandate outlines the five stages of the review process as 1. initial assessment; 2. informal mediation; 3. fact-finding; 4. access to a formal mediation; and 5. reporting.

Requests for review may be submitted by an individual, group or community (or its representative) that reasonably believes that it is being adversely affected by the activities of a Canadian extractive sector company in its operations outside Canada. Requests may also be submitted by Canadian extractive sector companies that believe they are the subject of unfounded allegations concerning its corporate conduct. The Counsellor will only undertake reviews with the consent of the involved parties.

The Counsellor's mandate specifies that Canada's National Contact Point (NCP) for the OECD Guidelines for Multinational Enterprises shall remain the primary authority with respect to the OECD Guidelines for Multinational Enterprises. The Counsellor is to work with the NCP on requests for review that relate to the OECD Guidelines.

== Review Process ==
Development of the Office and Processes

In May 2010 The Counsellor released an issues paper and a document outlining draft rules of procedure for discussion. These two documents provided background for a public consultation process which took place in Canada and internationally from June to September to help define how the dispute resolution process would work. The Counsellor released a document summarizing the public consultations in September 2010.

The "rules of procedure" for the Review Process were finalized in September 2010.

The launch of the Review Process took place on October 20, 2010.

The Counsellor submitted an Annual Report to Parliament in February 2011. Find it here http://www.international.gc.ca/csr_counsellor-conseiller_rse/index.aspx

== Four Pillars ==
One of the Four Pillars of the Canadian government CSR Strategy

In 2009 the federal government introduced a strategy called "Building the Canadian Advantage: A Corporate Social Responsibility (CSR) Strategy for the Canadian International Extractive Sector". This is aimed at improving the competitive advantage of Canadian international extractive sector companies by enhancing their ability to manage social and environmental risks. The government outlined four "pillars" to support this strategy:

1. Support initiatives to enhance the capacities of developing countries to manage the development of minerals and oil and gas and to benefit from these resources to reduce poverty.
2. Promote, primarily through the Department of Foreign Affairs and International Trade and Natural Resources Canada: the International Finance Corporation Performance Standards on Social & Environmental Sustainability; the Voluntary Principles on Security and Human Rights; The Global Reporting Initiative
3. Set up the Office of the Extractive Sector CSR Counsellor to assist stakeholders in the resolution of CSR issues pertaining to the activities of Canadian extractive sector companies abroad.
4. Support the development of a CSR Centre of Excellence within an existing institution outside of government to encourage the Canadian international extractive sector to implement these voluntary performance guidelines by developing and disseminating high-quality CSR information, training and tools.

== National Roundtables ==
Origin in the 2007 Roundtables Report

The concept of an independent ombudsman office, "mandated to provide advisory, fact-finding and reporting functions" was included in the recommendations of the 2007 Advisory Group Report on the National Roundtables on Corporate Social Responsibility (CSR) and the Canadian Extractive Industry in Developing Countries.
