= Ben Carr (politician) =

Canadian politician

Ben Carr MP

Member of Parliament for Winnipeg South Centre
- Incumbent
- Assumed office June 19, 2023
- Preceded by: Jim Carr

Personal details
- Born: 1986 (age 39–40) Winnipeg, Manitoba, Canada
- Party: Liberal
- Parent: Jim Carr (father)
- Education: University of Winnipeg (BEd); Carleton University (BA)
- Profession: Politician; educator; consultant

Ben Carr MP (born 1986) is a Canadian politician who was elected to the Canadian House of Commons in a by-election on June 19, 2023. He is a member of the Liberal Party of Canada. He succeeded his father, Jim Carr, who died in office on December 12, 2022, as the Member of Parliament (MP) for the federal riding of Winnipeg South Centre.

== Background ==
Carr's mother is Ruth (Simkin), a physician. Carr has worked as the vice president of Indigenous Strategy Alliance, a consulting firm; as a high school teacher, coach, and principal; and as a former federal Liberal government staffer. He announced that he would run for Parliament 3 months after his late father Jim Carr died. He announced his plans to run on February 2, 2023.

On May 7, 2024, Carr was elected chair of the Canadian House of Commons Standing Committee on Procedure and House Affairs. He was elected chair of the Canadian House of Commons Standing Committee on Industry, Science and Technology in the 45th Canadian Parliament in 2025.

In January 2025, Carr became the first Liberal Manitoba MP to call for Justin Trudeau to resign. In the 2025 Liberal Party of Canada leadership election, he endorsed Chrystia Freeland.

== Political views on Israel ==
In November 2023, Carr publicly raised concerns that an academic event titled "Palestine and Genocide: Reflections on Imperialism, Settler-colonialism and Decolonization" would provoke antisemitism. However, one of the speakers at the event, professor Judith Norman who herself is Jewish, said it was "offensive" to suggest the event would inflame antisemitism. Carr is also Jewish. In an op-ed published the same month, Carr argued "there is an unbreakable bond between Jews around the world, and the State of Israel". In March 2024, Carr was one of three Liberal MPs who voted against a non-binding motion calling for an arms embargo on Israel.

== Electoral record ==
2025 Canadian federal election: Winnipeg South Centre
** Preliminary results — Not yet official **
Party	Candidate	Votes	%	±%	Expenditures
Liberal	Ben Carr	33,834	63.62	+18.33	
Conservative	Royden Brousseau	14,748	27.73	–0.39	
New Democratic	Jorge Requena Ramos	3,463	6.51	–14.16	
Green	Chris Petriew	450	0.85	–1.80	
Communist	Cam Scott	314	0.59	+0.11	
People's	Jaclyn Cummings	272	0.51	–2.30	
Independent	Tait Palsson	99	0.19	N/A	
Total valid votes/expense limit					
Total rejected ballots					
Turnout		53,180	74.85		
Eligible voters		71,046			
Liberal notional hold		Swing		+9.36	
Source: Elections Canada
Note: Change in percentage value and swing are calculated from the redistributed results of the 2021 general election, not the June 2023 by-election.

Canadian federal by-election, June 19, 2023: Winnipeg South Centre Death of Jim Carr
Party	Candidate	Votes	%	±%
Liberal	Ben Carr	14,278	55.49	+9.94
Conservative	Damir Stipanovic	6,100	23.70	-4.11
New Democratic	Julia Riddell	3,778	14.68	-5.95
Green	Doug Hemmerling	698	2.71	-0.04
People's	Tylor Baer	324	1.26	-1.51
Rhinoceros	Sébastien CoRhino	55	0.21	
Independent	Tait Palsson	52	0.20	
Independent	Jevin David Carroll	36	0.14	
Independent	John Dale	29	0.11	
Independent	Glen MacDonald	27	0.10	
Independent	Connie Lukawski	24	0.09	
Independent	Paul Stewart	22	0.09	
Independent	Patrick Strzalkowski	19	0.07	
Independent	Mark Dejewski	18	0.07	
Independent	Stella Galas	16	0.06	
Independent	Demetrios Karavas	16	0.06	
Independent	Myriam Beaulieu	14	0.05	
Independent	Christopher Clacio	14	0.05	
Independent	Alain Bourgault	13	0.05	
Independent	Martin "Acetaria Caesar" Jubinville	13	0.05	
Independent	Krzysztof Krzywinski	13	0.05	
Independent	Alain Lamontagne	11	0.04	
Independent	Marie-Hélène LeBel	11	0.04	
Independent	Jordan Wong	11	0.04	
Independent	Line Bélanger	10	0.04	
Independent	Andrew Kozakewich	10	0.04	
Independent	Eliana Rosenblum	10	0.04	
Independent	Gerrit Dogger	9	0.03	
Independent	Julie St-Amand	9	0.03	
Independent	Alexandra Engering	8	0.03	
Independent	Anthony Hamel	8	0.03	
Independent	Darcy Justin Vanderwater	8	0.03	
Independent	Roger Sherwood	7	0.03	
Independent	Pascal St-Amand	7	0.03	
Independent	Dji-Pé Frazer	6	0.02	
Independent	Daniel Gagnon	6	0.02	
Independent	Spencer Rocchi	6	0.02	
Independent	Mário Stocco	6	0.02	
Independent	Manon Marie Lili Desbiens	5	0.02	
Independent	Ysack Émile Dupont	5	0.02	
Independent	Yusuf Nasihi	5	0.02	
Independent	Jaël Champagne Gareau	4	0.02	
Independent	Donovan Eckstrom	3	0.01	
Independent	Ryan Huard	2	0.01	
Independent	Lorant Polya	2	0.01	
Independent	Benjamin Teichman	2	0.01	
Independent	Gavin Vanderwater	2	0.01	
Independent	Saleh Waziruddin	1	0.00	
Total valid votes		25,733	99.52	
Total rejected ballots		125	0.48	-0.26
Turnout		25,858	36.82	-32.79
Eligible voters		70,230		
Liberal hold		Swing		+7.02
Source: Elections Canada
