= Anita Neville =

Canadian politician (born 1942)

Her Honour the Honourable Anita Neville PC OM
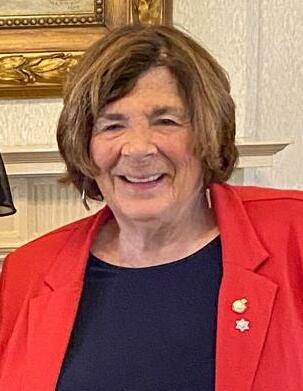
- Neville in 2023

26th Lieutenant Governor of Manitoba
- Incumbent
- Assumed office October 24, 2022
- Monarch: Charles III
- Governors General: Mary Simon; Louise Arbour
- Premier: Heather Stefanson; Wab Kinew
- Preceded by: Janice Filmon

Member of Parliament for Winnipeg South Centre
- In office November 27, 2000 – May 2, 2011
- Preceded by: Lloyd Axworthy
- Succeeded by: Joyce Bateman

Personal details
- Born: July 22, 1942 (age 84) Winnipeg, Manitoba, Canada
- Party: Independent
- Other political affiliations: Liberal
- Education: University of Manitoba (BA)

Anita Ruth Neville PC OM (born July 22, 1942) is a Canadian politician from Manitoba, who has served as the province's 26th lieutenant governor since 2022. She was also a Liberal member of the House of Commons of Canada, first being elected in the general election of 2000. She was re-elected in 2004, 2006, and 2008. After serving for more than ten years, she lost her seat in the election of 2011.

In 2022, Prime Minister Justin Trudeau, through Governor General Mary Simon, appointed Neville to succeed Janice Filmon as lieutenant governor of Manitoba. She is the first Jewish lieutenant governor of Manitoba and the third who is female.

== Early life and career ==
Neville was born in Winnipeg, Manitoba. She earned a Bachelor of Arts degree in political science from the University of Manitoba. Before entering political life, Neville worked as an economic development consultant for the province of Manitoba. She was a director of Workforce 2000 and the Winnipeg Core Area Initiative and Employment Training Program, and has also been involved in the Law Society of Manitoba and the Winnipeg Jewish Child and Family organization. During the 1990s, she was a member of the Canadian delegation which was responsible for monitoring elections in post-war Bosnia and Herzegovina.

Neville was for several years a school trustee on the Winnipeg School Board, representing Ward One in the Winnipeg School Division from 1986 to 2000. Neville regularly topped the poll in her three-member constituency. She served as Chair of the Board for five years (1987–1989; 1996–1998), and also chaired its finance committee for some time.

== Family and Personal Life ==
Neville is the former wife of William Franklin Wymark "Bill" Neville; the couple had three daughters together and she is now a grandmother to six children. Neville has spoken about her Jewish immigrant roots in Winnipeg's North End, noting that her grandparents fled antisemitic persecution in Bessarabia and Odessa roughly a century ago before settling in Canada.

== Federal politics ==
In the 1995 provincial election in Manitoba, Neville was a Liberal candidate in the upscale west-central Winnipeg riding of River Heights. This riding is usually considered as one of the few safe seats for the provincial Liberals, and was previously held by party leader Sharon Carstairs prior to her appointment to the Senate of Canada in 1994. Amid an ongoing drop in support for the Liberals, however, Neville came second with 4,435 votes, whereas Progressive Conservative candidate Mike Radcliffe got 5,429.

Later in 1995, Neville was re-elected as a Winnipeg school trustee, finishing in first place in Ward One with 13,828 votes. In the 1999 election, she chaired the successful campaign of provincial Liberal leader Jon Gerrard in River Heights.

In the 2000 federal election, Neville was the Liberal nominee for the Winnipeg South Centre district, previously held by the retiring Lloyd Axworthy. She was elected with 15,231 votes, against 10,675 for her nearest competitor, Progressive Conservative David Newman. This contest was notable for a controversy involving Canadian Alliance candidate Betty Granger, who made comments about Asian students that many interpreted as racist.

In the 2004 election, following substantial boundary reassignments, Neville was re-elected with 18,133 votes against 10,516 for Conservative candidate Raj Joshi.

In 2008, Neville was re-elected with 16,438 votes (42.3%) against 14,103 (36.3%) for Conservative Party candidate Trevor Kennerd, 5,490 (14.1%) for New Democratic Party candidate Rachel Heinrichs, and 2,860 (7.4%) for Green Party candidate Vere Scott.

During Paul Martin's time as prime minister, Neville served as the Parliamentary Secretary to the Minister of Canadian Heritage. She has also served as the Official Opposition Critic for Indigenous Affairs.

In the 2011 election, Neville lost to Conservative Joyce Bateman by 696 votes.

== Political interests ==
Neville was the Official Opposition Critic for the Status of Women, and was a member of the Standing Committee on the Status of Women and the Standing Committee on Aboriginal Affairs and Northern Development.

During her time in Parliament, Neville was a prominent Liberal supporter of Israel and co-chaired of the Liberal Parliamentarians for Israel with Senator David Smith. She was also a vocal opponent of the war with Iraq in early 2003 and was a leading opponent of the proposed American Missile Defense Shield. She has also supported numerous initiatives in the Indigenous community and supported the legalization of same-sex marriage in 2005.

== Honours and Awards ==
Ribbon Bar of Anita Neville

Ribbon	Description	Post-nominal letters	Notes
	Order of Manitoba	OM	
	125th Anniversary of the Confederation of Canada Medal		
	Queen Elizabeth II Golden Jubilee Medal		Canadian version
	Queen Elizabeth II Diamond Jubilee Medal		Canadian version
	Queen Elizabeth II Platinum Jubilee Medal		Canadian version
	King Charles III Coronation Medal		Canadian version

== Electoral history ==
2011 Canadian federal election: Winnipeg South Centre
Party	Candidate	Votes	%	±%	Expenditures
Conservative	Joyce Bateman	15,506	38.82	+2.56	$72,590.37
Liberal	Anita Neville	14,784	37.02	−5.25	$79,128.33
New Democratic	Dennis Lewycky	7,945	19.89	+5.78	$15,656.19
Green	Joshua McNeil	1,383	3.46	−3.89	$1,586.80
Independent	Matt Henderson	218	0.55	–	$129.79
Independent	Lyndon B. Froese	103	0.26	–	$0.00
Total valid votes/expense limit		39,939	99.62		–
Total rejected ballots		154	0.38	−0.00	
Turnout		40,093	69.04	+3.36	
Eligible voters		58,075	–	–	
Conservative gain from Liberal		Swing		+3.91	

2008 Canadian federal election: Winnipeg South Centre
Party	Candidate	Votes	%	±%	Expenditures
Liberal	Anita Neville	16,438	42.27	+3.02	$74,911
Conservative	Trevor Kennerd	14,103	36.26	+4.77	$74,675
New Democratic	Rachel Heinrichs	5,490	14.12	−7.69	$10,465
Green	Vere Scott	2,860	7.35	+2.90	$1,774
Total valid votes/expense limit		38,891	99.61		$77,552
Total rejected ballots		151	0.39	+0.03	
Turnout		39,042	65.68	-3.81	
Eligible voters		59,444	–	–	
Liberal hold		Swing		-0.87	

2006 Canadian federal election: Winnipeg South Centre
Party	Candidate	Votes	%	±%	Expenditures
Liberal	Anita Neville	16,296	39.25	−7.35	$71,377
Conservative	Michael Richards	13,077	31.49	+4.47	$72,385
New Democratic	Mark Wasyliw	9,055	21.81	+0.56	$19,492
Green	Vere H. Scott	1,848	4.45	+0.58	$1,237
Progressive Canadian	Dale Swirsky	934	2.25	–	$11,137
Independent	Jeffrey Anderson	246	0.59	–	$3,204
Canadian Action	Magnus Thompson	66	0.16	−0.13	$2,750
Total valid votes		41,522	99.64		–
Total rejected ballots		150	0.36	+0.00	
Turnout		41,672	69.49	+6.85	
Eligible voters		59,971	–	–	
Liberal hold		Swing		-5.91	

2004 Canadian federal election: Winnipeg South Centre
Party	Candidate	Votes	%	±%	Expenditures
Liberal	Anita Neville	18,133	46.60	+4.64	$70,382
Conservative	Raj Joshi	10,516	27.02	-10.49	$62,453
New Democratic	James Allum	8,270	21.25	+2.94	$29,392
Green	Ian Scott	1,508	3.88	–	$1,030
Marijuana	Andy Caisse	293	0.75	–	–
Canadian Action	Magnus Thompson	114	0.29	–	$1,617
Communist	Andrew Dalgliesh	81	0.21	–	$654
Total valid votes		38,915	99.64		–
Total rejected ballots		139	0.36	–	
Turnout		39,054	62.64		
Eligible voters		62,346	–	–	
Liberal hold		Swing		+7.57	

Note: Change is based on redistributed results. Conservative vote is compared to the total of the Canadian Alliance vote and Progressive Conservative vote in 2000 election.

2000 Canadian federal election: Winnipeg South Centre
Party	Candidate	Votes	%	±%
Liberal	Anita Neville	15,231	40.46	−15.42
Progressive Conservative	David Newman	10,675	28.36	+14.36
New Democratic	James Allum	7,501	19.93	+3.96
Alliance	Betty Granger	3,210	8.53	−3.92
Marijuana	Chris Buors	640	1.70	
Canadian Action	Magnus Thompson	202	0.54	
Communist	David Allison	181	0.48	
Total valid votes		37,640	99.52	
Total rejected ballots		181	0.48	-0.35
Turnout		37,821	62.54	-2.38
Eligible voters		60,471	–	–
Liberal hold		Swing		-14.89

Note: Canadian Alliance vote is compared to the Reform vote in 1997 election.

Order of precedence
Preceded by Louise Imbeault as Lieutenant Governor of New Brunswick	Canadian order of precedence as Lieutenant Governor of Manitoba	Succeeded by Wendy Lisogar-Cocchia as Lieutenant Governor of British Columbia
Preceded by Charles III as King of Canada	Order of precedence in Manitoba as Lieutenant Governor of Manitoba	Succeeded by Wab Kinew as President of the Executive Council of Manitoba
