= Sheri Meyerhoffer =

Canadian lawyer

Canadian Ombudsperson for Responsible Enterprise.
- Incumbent; Sheri Meyerhoffer since 2019
- Appointer: Minister of International Trade, Export Promotion, Small Business and Economic Development
- Formation: 2019
- First holder: Sheri Meyerhoffer

Sheri Meyerhoffer is a Canadian lawyer and the Canadian Ombudsperson for Responsible Enterprise.

== Early life and education ==
Meyerhoffer was born in Saskatchewan. She studied law at the University of Saskatchewan and a graduated with a master's degree in public administration from the Harvard Kennedy School in 2018.

== Career ==
Meyerhoffer worked as lawyer for Howard Mackie and Amoco Canada Petroleum Company; and as a lobbyist for the Canadian Association of Petroleum Producers, before working as a self-employed oil and gas consultant. She joined the Canadian Bar Association in 2006, before working for the International Institute for Democracy and Electoral Assistance in Nepal until 2017. Meyerhoffer escaped the Nepal earthquakes uninjured.

She was appointed by Jim Carr as the first Canadian Ombudsperson for Responsible Enterprise in 2019, tasked with investigating corporate ethics allegations.
