= 2022 United Kingdom government crisis =

2022 United Kingdom government crisis or crises may refer to:

- July 2022 United Kingdom government crisis, events culminating in the resignation of Boris Johnson as prime minister
- September 2022 United Kingdom government crisis, events in the aftermath of the September mini-budget
- October 2022 United Kingdom government crisis, events culminating in the resignation of Liz Truss as prime minister
