= Prorogation in Canada =

End of a parliamentary session

Prorogation is the end of a parliamentary session in the Parliament of Canada and the parliaments of its provinces and territories. It differs from a recess or adjournment, which do not end a session; and differs from a complete dissolution of parliament, which ends both the session and the entire parliament, requiring an election for the House of Commons in the bicameral federal parliament and the singular legislative chamber of the unicameral provincial parliaments.

In the Canadian parliamentary system, the legislature is typically prorogued upon the completion of the agenda set forth in the Speech from the Throne and remains in recess until the monarch or governor general, in the federal sphere, or lieutenant governor, in a province, summons parliamentarians. Since 2008, when the Parliament of Canada was prorogued for political reasons in lieu of dissolution, followed by a second use by the same prime minister in 2009, prorogation has been the subject of ongoing discussion among academics, the Canadian public, and their political representatives.

== Mechanism ==
It is, according to the constitution of Canada, the Canadian monarch's royal prerogative to prorogue the legislatures, though this is usually done for the federal parliament by the sovereign's federal representative, the Governor General of Canada, and always for the provincial parliaments by the monarch's provincial representatives, the lieutenant governors. Like all such actions of the sovereign and governors, this is exclusively done on the advice of the relevant prime minister who holds the confidence of the House of Commons.

A parliamentary session lasts until a prorogation, after which, without ceremony in recent years, one or both chambers of the legislature cease all legislative business until the governor general or lieutenant governor issues a proclamation calling for a new session to begin. For the federal parliament, except for the election of a speaker for the House of Commons and his or her claiming of that house's privileges, the same procedures for the opening of parliament are again followed.

Prorogation is a routine action, including in "situations where governments need to stop and refocus." At the same time, arbitrary use of the power of prorogation can "[unbalance] the very fragile balance of power that exists between the different parts of government." What is paramount is that the legislature be recalled so the opposition can hold the cabinet to account for its actions, a task central to the functioning of responsible government.

== History ==
In the 19th and early 20th centuries, prorogations in Canada lasted at least half of any given year. Parliament would typically be in session from February until June, give or take a few months, and would be prorogued for the remainder of the year, giving Members of Parliament the opportunity to spend a substantial amount of time in their home ridings. Only when vast amounts of legislation needed to be debated and passed during the Second World War did parliament begin to sit for longer sessions. This was followed by an expansion of the government's role in Canadian life through the 1950s and 1960s, requiring even shorter prorogations. Additionally, the advent of modern communication tools and air travel rendered long prorogations even more unnecessary; Members of Parliament may contact their home ridings whenever they want and can visit their home ridings during adjournments. Today, sessions of parliament still last about one year each, but the prorogation in between sessions is often only a few days and new sessions are started more for organizational or political reasons than for the purpose of giving members of parliament time away. Between 1867 and 2010 the average period of prorogation was 151 days. However, in the 30 year period between 1980 and 2010, the average was just 22 days.

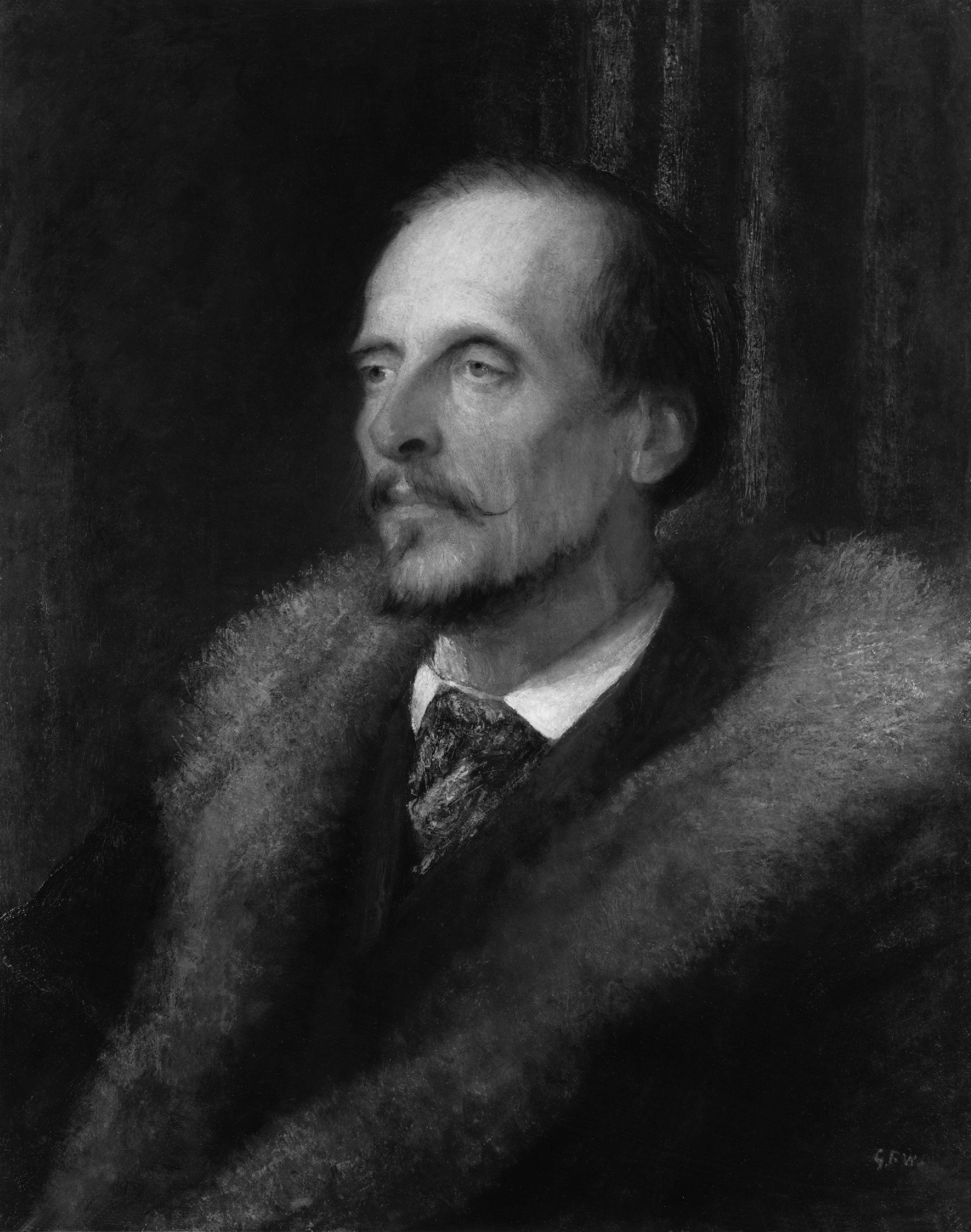
Governor General the Earl of Dufferin

In 1873, during the 2nd Canadian Parliament, Prime Minister Sir John A. Macdonald advised Governor General the Earl of Dufferin to prorogue parliament in order to stop the work of a committee investigating Macdonald's involvement in the Pacific Scandal. While the Governor General did reluctantly accept advice to prorogue parliament, he insisted that the prorogation be limited to a period of ten weeks, and that a commission be appointed to continue the hearings, which would report to parliament when it reconvened. When parliament returned and the commission presented their findings, Macdonald was censured and had to resign. According to Christopher Moore, it was at this point that the relationship between backbenchers and the prime minister began an evolution; "MacDonald himself became one of the inventors of the 'party machine'—the party as a disciplined, centralized, loyal team that would not dare to turn on him as it had in 1873." By the mid-20th century, parliamentary caucuses were being told by their leaders that they had "no right to question what a leader did or said".

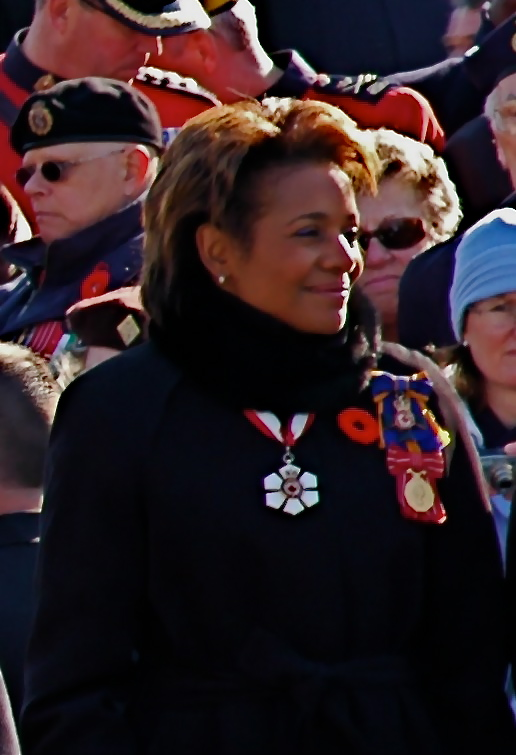
Governor General Michaëlle Jean

In 2002, Governor General Adrienne Clarkson accepted Prime Minister Jean Chrétien's advice to prorogue parliament, allowing Chrétien to avoid tabling a report to the House of Commons public accounts committee regarding the sponsorship scandal that surrounded Chrétien's party at the time. After parliament was again summoned, investigations into the scandal continued, Chrétien stepped down as Prime Minister in December of the following year, and the Liberal party was reduced to a minority government in the subsequent election.

A prorogation of parliament took place on December 4, 2008, when Prime Minister Stephen Harper advised Governor General Michaëlle Jean to do so after the opposition Liberal and New Democratic parties formed a coalition with the support of the Bloc Québécois party and threatened to vote non-confidence in the sitting minority government, precipitating a parliamentary dispute. The Governor General, however, did not grant her prime minister's request until after two hours of consultation with various constitutional experts. Upon the end of her tenure as vicereine, Jean revealed to the Canadian Press that the delay was partly to "send a message—and for people to understand that this warranted reflection". It was also at the same time said by Peter H. Russell, one of those from whom Jean sought advice, that Canadians ought not regard as an automatic rubber stamp the Governor General's decision to accept Harper's advice concerning prorogation; Russell disclosed that Jean granted the prorogation on two conditions: parliament would reconvene soon and, when it did, the Cabinet would present a proposed budget, a vote on which is a confidence matter. This, Russell said, set a precedent that would prevent future prime ministers from advising the prorogation of parliament "for any length of time for any reason". Nelson Wiseman, a political science professor at the University of Toronto, wrote of Harper that "no Prime Minister has so abused the power to prorogue".

Harper again advised the Governor General to prorogue parliament on December 30, 2009. The Prime Minister stated that this was to keep parliament in recess for the duration of the XXI Olympic Winter Games to be held in Vancouver, British Columbia, in February 2010. The move, however, was suspected by opposition Members of Parliament to be a way for Harper to avoid ongoing investigations into the Afghan detainees affair.

In October 2012, Lieutenant Governor of Ontario David Onley, on the advice of Premier Dalton McGuinty, who headed a minority government, prorogued the Ontario Legislature, with McGuinty announcing, at the same time, he would, after a new party leader was selected, resign both as premier and leader of the Ontario Liberal Party. Liberal House Leader John Milloy later stated that prorogation was necessary because an impasse was reached with labour leaders and the opposition over plans to freeze all public sector wages. The opposition charged that it was done to dodge negative publicity over the investigation and criminal probe into the Ornge Air affair, as well as the controversial decision to halt construction of two gas-fired power plants during the previous election and the subsequent threats by the opposition to vote on finding Cabinet ministers in Contempt of Parliament for withholding from the legislature information related to halting the projects. In early 2013, Onley explained in an interview conducted by the Toronto Star that, though he and McGuinty discussed the matter, among others, before he granted the prorogation, he ultimately could only follow the constitution and adhere to the principles of responsible government; only if the premier were "trying to subvert democracy" could Onley have refused the advice and, as Onley put it, "something that's politically controversial doesn't fit that category. Doesn't even come close... It's up to the politicians to work out the political process, the political decision-making that is behind prorogation—and the fallout after prorogation." On the subject of the lack of a date on which the legislature would be summoned to return, the Lieutenant Governor said he had no guide; the legislature's standing orders outline that a specific date must be set, but the Legislative Assembly Act does not, and precedents are inconsistent.

On August 18, 2020, Prime Minister Justin Trudeau asked Governor General Julie Payette to prorogue parliament until September 23 amidst the aftermath of the WE Charity scandal and cabinet shuffle. His request was granted.

On January 6, 2025, Prime Minister Trudeau asked Governor General Mary Simon to prorogue parliament until March 24 due to mounting pressure from his own caucus to resign while leading a minority government under threat from other parties to unseat his government through an imminent non-confidence motion. His request was granted, and Trudeau subsequently announced that he will resign as prime minister when his Liberal Party picks a successor. The decision was subject to a legal challenge and upheld in the Federal Court.

== Calls for reform ==
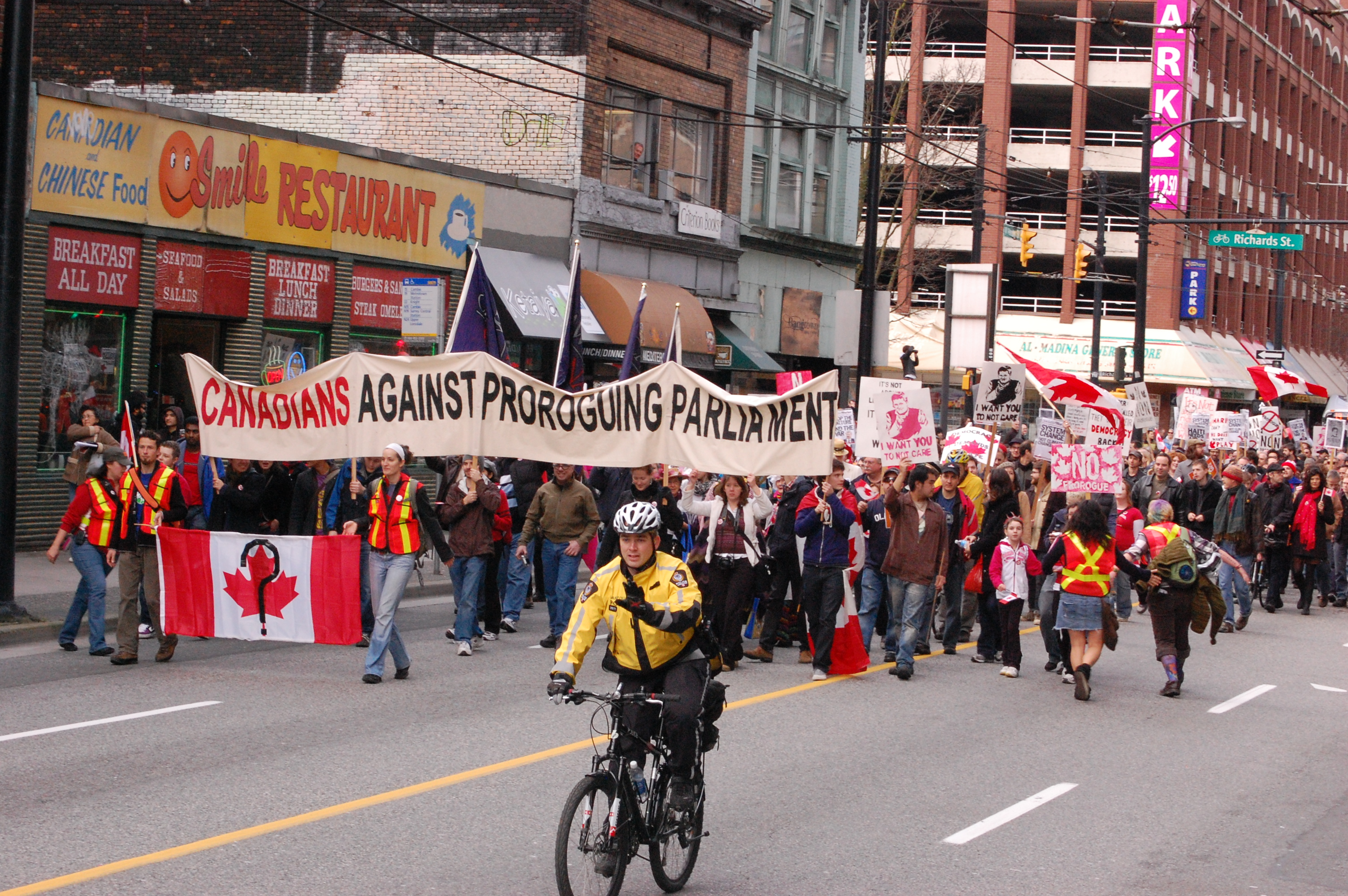
A march in Vancouver against the second prorogation of the 40th Parliament

The prorogations of the federal parliament in 2008 and 2009, and the speculation that such use of the royal prerogative had been advised by the sitting prime minister for political purposes, triggered protests in various cities across the country through early 2010.

Within a week after the latter prorogation, the multi-partisan organization Fair Vote Canada had gathered the signatures of 132 political scientists to a letter condemning the move and advocating for electoral reform. New Democratic Party (NDP) leader Jack Layton called on January 20 and 23, 2010, for limits to prorogation, stating his party would put forward proposed legislative changes that would require a majority vote of MPs for the prorogation of parliament. Five days later, Liberal Party of Canada leader Michael Ignatieff also called for limits to the ability of the prime minister to advise the prorogation of parliament, his plan requiring the consent of the House of Commons of Canada, following ten days written notice and debate. Ignatieff brushed off questions about the constitutionality of the proposed changes, saying if new rules are established, governors general "will respect those constitutional conventions" as they always have, adding: "The problem is not with the governor general. The problem is with the Prime Minister of Canada." These proposals echoed the arrangements within the Long Parliament of England, between 1640 and 1648, which could only be dissolved with the agreement of its members.

The NDP presented a motion to the House of Commons requesting the prime minister not advise the governor general to prorogue parliament for more than seven days unless approved by a majority vote by the lower house. The motion passed on March 17, 2010, by a vote of 139 to 135, but motions are not binding. Five days later, Liberal, Bloc Québécois, and NDP MPs used their majority in the Commons committee in charge of MPs' privilege and rules to approve an official review of the convention of prorogation, which could require a prime minister to seek approval from the House before asking the governor general to end a parliamentary session.

In October 2010, Peter Russell said to the press that he had organized for February 2011, with the support of Governor General David Johnston, a meeting of constitutional scholars, historians, and government officials from various countries in the hopes of finding a consensus on how the royal prerogative should be used in future scenarios similar to that which took place at the end of 2008. Following the prorogation of the Legislative Assembly of Ontario in October 2012, Daniel Weinstock, a professor of law at McGill University, opined that there may be a need for new procedures "to discipline power", limiting in all of Canada's jurisdictions the royal prerogative to prorogue parliament, among other legislative procedures. At the same time, some journalists, such as Norman Spector and Andrew Coyne, lamented the abuse of the power of prorogation and its negative effect on democracy in Canada. However, the Federal Court of Canada, in a 2009 ruling, found that tampering with the Crown's prerogatives could not be done via normal legislation, requiring instead an amendment to the constitution pursuant to Section 41 of the Constitution Act, 1982.

Christopher Moore opined in Canada's History that "no great web of new legislation or constitutional procedure is needed to rein in the abuse of prime ministerial powers. Other parliaments around the world regularly see party leaders and prime ministers dumped when their own backbenchers and prime ministers [sic] grow tired of them. If our premiers and prime ministers knew that legislatures would rebuke them for abusing parliament (as did the backbenchers in the legislature of 1873), we would not have to worry about rogue prorogations."

== 2025 legal challenge ==
Until the 2024–2025 Canadian political crisis, little discussion took on the significance of the 2019 UK case of R (Miller) v The Prime Minister, which overturned a prorogation, on similar Canadian events. In January 2025, Prime Minister's Justin Trudeau's prorogation of the House of Commons was challenged in the Federal Court citing Miller II. During arguments, government lawyers argued that Miller II's holding that the constitutional role of Parliament by prorogation could be distinguished because of the unique scenario with the British Parliament's role in relation to an imminently approaching Brexit. Government lawyers also argued that unlike the unwritten Constitution of the United Kingdom, which was silent on required Parliamentary sittings, Section 5 of the Canadian Charter of Rights and Freedoms required annual sittings providing a check on the power. In March 2025, Federal Court Chief Justice Paul Crampton held that the decision to prorogue was justiciable, but ultimately declined to adopt Miller II.. He ruled the applicants had failed to prove that Trudeau had breached the Charter or any other legal limits on the power, and dismissed the case.

== See also ==
- Parliamentary procedure
- Royal prerogative
