= Joyce Bateman =

Canadian politician

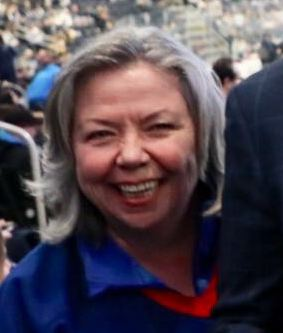
- Bateman in 2018

Member of Parliament for Winnipeg South Centre
- In office May 2, 2011 – October 19, 2015
- Preceded by: Anita Neville
- Succeeded by: Jim Carr

Personal details
- Born: 1957 (age 68–69) Winnipeg, Manitoba, Canada
- Party: Liberal (to 2009); Conservative (2011-present)
- Profession: Politician; accountant

Joyce Bateman (born 1957) is a Canadian politician. She served as the Member of Parliament (MP) for the electoral district of Winnipeg South Centre from 2011 to 2015.

== Early and personal life ==
Born in Winnipeg, Manitoba, Bateman was involved in the musical community. After training four summers at the Banff School of Fine Arts, she went to study at the University of Western Ontario under Ralph Aldrich. She put herself through university there by playing viola in the London Symphony Orchestra and received her HBA from the Ivey School of Business.

After attending business school, Bateman articled with Price Waterhouse in Winnipeg. She is a chartered accountant.

Bateman was elected to the Winnipeg School Board as a trustee in 2001. She served two terms as chairperson, and one term as vice-chairperson. Her tenure saw the reinstatement of the Nursery Program for the Winnipeg School Division in 2005. It had been cut by the Board in 1998.

== Federal politics ==
In late 2003, Bateman became a member of the Liberal Party. She allowed her party membership to lapse in 2009. In 2011, she said that she opted to run as a Conservative due to misgivings over the fiscal policies of the Liberal Party, which she described as "reckless."

In 2011, given her four-time successful electoral record as a school trustee (2001, 2002, 2006 and 2010), Bateman was sought out by the Conservative Party of Canada to run in Winnipeg South Centre. She was successful.

While serving in Parliament there was a serious problem with a rail crossing in her riding. As a result, she introduced a Private Members’ Bill on Rail Safety which makes every rail crossing throughout Canada safer.

Bateman was defeated in 2015 by former Liberal provincial MLA Jim Carr, falling to 28% of the vote.

Bateman re-contested her previous riding in a rematch against Carr in the 2019 federal election but lost. She lost again in the 2021 federal election.

== Personal life ==
Bateman has worked and lived in Winnipeg since completing school. She met Darrell Hancock while at Price Waterhouse. Hancock and Bateman are married and have two children.

== Electoral record ==
2021 Canadian federal election: Winnipeg South Centre
Party	Candidate	Votes	%	±%	Expenditures
Liberal	Jim Carr	22,214	45.55	+0.54	$84,273.45
Conservative	Joyce Bateman	13,566	27.82	−1.89	$83,919.18
New Democratic	Julia Riddell	10,064	20.64	+2.94	$12,522.59
People's	Chase Wells	1,352	2.77	+1.65	$1,885.74
Green	Douglas Hemmerling	1,341	2.75	−3.51	$21,799.84
Communist	Cam Scott	234	0.48	N/A	N/A
Total valid votes/expense limit		48,771	99.26		$106,382.19
Total rejected ballots		364	0.74	+0.22	
Turnout		49,135	69.60	-1.37	
Eligible voters		70,592			
Liberal hold		Swing		+1.22	
Source: Elections Canada

2019 Canadian federal election: Winnipeg South Centre
Party	Candidate	Votes	%	±%	Expenditures
Liberal	Jim Carr	22,799	45.00	−14.72	$83,512.07
Conservative	Joyce Bateman	15,051	29.71	+1.52	$37,521.63
New Democratic	Elizabeth Shearer	8,965	17.70	+8.74	$8,170.86
Green	James Beddome	3,173	6.26	+3.13	$3,211.69
People's	Jane MacDiarmid	569	1.12	–	$7,017.57
Christian Heritage	Linda Marynuk	104	0.21	–	none listed
Total valid votes/expense limit		50,661	99.48		
Total rejected ballots		267	0.52	+0.17	
Turnout		50,928	70.97	-5.30	
Eligible voters		71,760			
Liberal hold		Swing		−8.12	
Source: Elections Canada

2015 Canadian federal election: Winnipeg South Centre
Party	Candidate	Votes	%	±%	Expenditures
Liberal	Jim Carr	31,993	59.72	+23.13	$138,860.30
Conservative	Joyce Bateman	15,102	28.19	−12.96	$92,738.43
New Democratic	Matt Henderson	4,799	8.96	−9.39	$29,074.48
Green	Andrew Park	1,677	3.13	−0.09	$26,901.85
Total valid votes/expense limit		53,571	99.65		$203,341.22
Total rejected ballots		188	0.35	–	
Turnout		53,759	76.27	–	
Eligible voters		70,487			
Liberal gain from Conservative		Swing		+18.05	
Source: Elections Canada

2011 Canadian federal election: Winnipeg South Centre
Party	Candidate	Votes	%	±%	Expenditures
Conservative	Joyce Bateman	15,506	38.82	+2.56	$72,590.37
Liberal	Anita Neville	14,784	37.02	−5.25	$79,128.33
New Democratic	Dennis Lewycky	7,945	19.89	+5.78	$15,656.19
Green	Joshua McNeil	1,383	3.46	−3.89	$1,586.80
Independent	Matt Henderson	218	0.55	–	$129.79
Independent	Lyndon B. Froese	103	0.26	–	$0.00
Total valid votes/expense limit		39,939	99.62		–
Total rejected ballots		154	0.38	−0.00	
Turnout		40,093	69.04	+3.36	
Eligible voters		58,075	–	–	
Conservative gain from Liberal		Swing		+3.91	
