= Canadian Ombudsperson for Responsible Enterprise =

Canadian corporate ethics ombudsman

- Abbreviation: CORE
- Predecessor: Extractive Sector CSR Counsellor
- Formation: 2019
- Key people: Sheri Meyerhoffer
- Budget: $4.9 m CAD
- Website: core-ombuds.canada.ca

The Canadian Ombudsperson for Responsible Enterprise (CORE, French: Ombudsman canadien de la responsabilité des entreprises) is a Canadian ombudsman that investigates ethical violations. It was established in 2019 and its shutdown was announced in 2026.

== Activities and history ==
CORE was established by Prime Minister Justin Trudeau in April 2019, with the appointment of lawyer Sheri Meyerhoffer to the office. The office investigates suspected corporate ethics and human rights violations. Its role is restricted to the mining, petroleum, and clothing sectors. CORE was the successor to Canada's corporate social responsibility counsellor. It has an annual budget of $4.9 million.

By May 2023, the ombudsman was criticised for having submitted zero reports to the International Trade Minister. At the time CORE was looking into fifteen matters, all of which were in the "initial assessment" phase of investigation.

In July 2023, CORE launched its first investigation into Nike Canada and Dynasty Gold Corp., accusing both of exploiting Uyghur forced labour in Xinjiang. In August the same year, CORE started investigating Ralph Lauren for using a supply chain that included the use of Uyghur forced labour and stated that it was looking into accusations that mining company GobiMin did the same.

In May 2024, after Meyerhoffer completed her five-year term, Masud Husain, a staff lawyer from Global Affairs Canada became interim ombudsperson. At that time, the federal government announced it would launch a review of the position.

In June 2026, Prime Minister Mark Carney announced that the office would be shut down, citing its ineffectiveness. At the time, the ombud role had been vacant for over a year. During its lifetime, it only launched five investigations, of which only one led to recommendations being made to a company. Critics pointed to its inability to compel companies being investigated to produce documents and people to testify.
