= Toli County =

Toli County 托里县 (Chinese) تولى ناھىيىسى (Uyghur) تولى اۋدانى (Kazakh)
- County
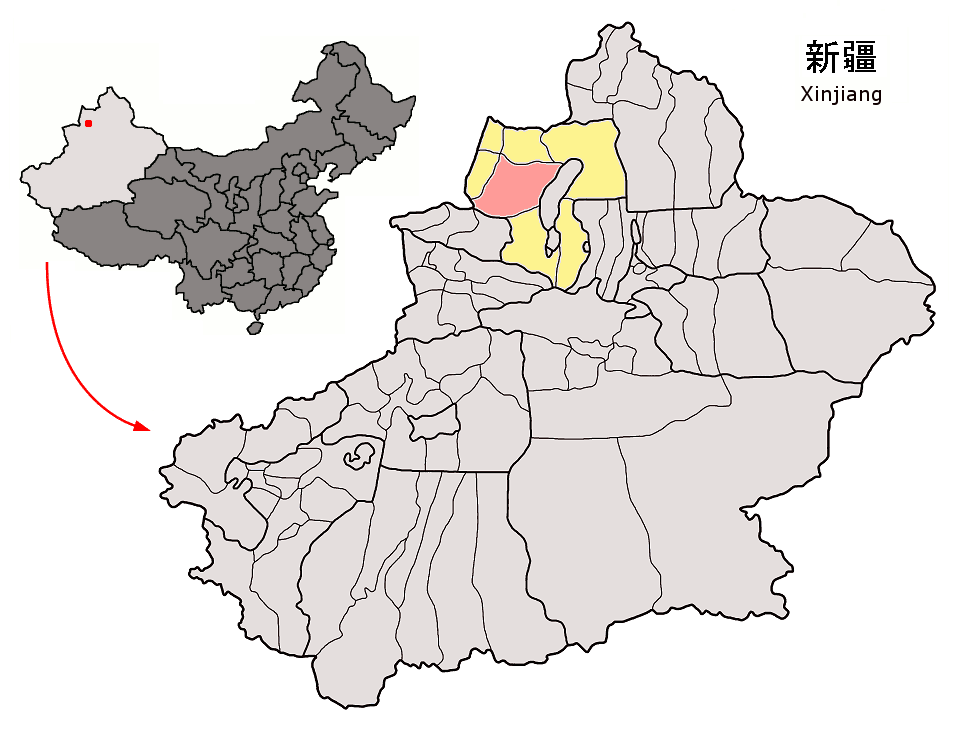
- Location of Toli County (red) within Tacheng Prefecture (yellow) and Xinjiang

- Location of the seat in Xinjiang Toli (Xinjiang) Toli (China)
- Country: China
- Autonomous region: Xinjiang
- Prefecture: Tacheng
- County seat: Toli Town

Area
  - Total: 19,981.88 km^{2} (7,715.05 sq mi)

Population (2020)
  - Total: 85,451
  - Density: 4.2764/km^{2} (11.076/sq mi)
- Time zone: UTC+8 (China Standard (Note: Locals in Xinjiang frequently observe UTC+6 (Xinjiang Time), 2 hours behind Beijing.))
- Website: www.xjtl.gov.cn

Toli County

Chinese name
- Simplified Chinese: 托里县
- Traditional Chinese: 託里縣
Transcriptions
Standard Mandarin
- Hanyu Pinyin: Tuōlǐ Xiàn

Uyghur name
- Uyghur: تولى ناھىيىسى
Transcriptions
- Latin Yëziqi: Toli Nahiyisi
- Yengi Yeziⱪ: Toli Naⱨiyisi
- SASM/GNC: Toli Nahiyisi
- Siril Yëziqi: Толи Наһийиси

Kazakh name
- Kazakh: تولى اۋدانى

Toli County is a county situated in the north of the Xinjiang Uyghur Autonomous Region and is under the administration of the Tacheng Prefecture. It has an area of 19,982 km^{2} (7,715 sq mi) with a population of 90,000. The Postcode is 834500.

== Demographics ==
The proportion of nationalities in Toli County
Nationality	Percentage
Kazakhs	72.5%
Han People	24.4%
Uyghurs	1.3%
Hui People	1.1%
Mongols	0.5%
Xibe people	0.1%
Others	0.1%
Source of the population statistics :

== Administrative divisions ==
Yumin County is divided into 4 towns, 4 townships.

Name	Simplified Chinese	Hanyu Pinyin	Uyghur (UEY)	Uyghur Latin (ULY)	Kazakh (Arabic script)	Kazakh (Cyrillic script)	Administrative division code
Towns
Toli Town	托里镇	Tuōlǐ Zhèn	تولى بازىرى	toli baziri	تولى قالاشىعى	Толы қалашығы	654224100
Tiechanggou Town (Tömürtam Town)	铁厂沟镇	Tiěchǎnggōu Zhèn	تۆمۈرتام بازىرى (تېچاڭگۇ بازىرى)	tömürtam baziri (tëchanggu baziri)	تەمىرتام قالاشىعى	Теміртам қалашығы	654224101
Miaoergou Town (Uty Town)	庙尔沟镇	Miào'ěrgōu Zhèn	ئۇت بازىرى	Ut baziri	ۇتى قالاشىعى	Ұты қалашығы	654224102
Qatw Town (Hatu Town)	哈图镇	Hǎtú Zhèn	قاتۇ بازىرى	qatu baziri	قاتۋ قالاشىعى	Қату қалашығы	654224103
Townships
Dolati Township	多拉特乡	Duōlātè Xiāng	دولاتى يېزىسى	dolati yëzisi	دولاتى اۋىلى	Долаты ауылы	654224200
Örshölit Township	乌雪特乡	Wūxuětè Xiāng	ئۆرشۆلىت يېزىسى	Örshölit yëzisi	وشەتى اۋىلى	Өшеті ауылы	654224201
Küp Township	库普乡	Kùpǔ Xiāng	كۈپ يېزىسى	küp yëzisi	كۇپ اۋىلى	Күп ауылы	654224202
Aqbëldiw Township	阿克别里斗乡	Ākèbiélǐdǒu Xiāng	ئاقبېلدىۋ يېزىسى	Aqbëldiw yëzisi	اقبەلدەۋ اۋىلى	Ақбелдеу ауылы	654224203

Others

- Baiyanghe Tree Farm (白杨河林场) (تېرەكتى ئورمانچىلىق مەيدانى) (تەرەكتى ورمان الاڭىنداعى)
- Laofengkou Tree Farm (老风口林场) (سارغۇسۇن ئورمانچىلىق مەيدانى) (سارعۋسىن ورمان الاڭىنداعى)
- Tasti Tree Farm of Barlyk Mountains (巴尔鲁克山塔斯特林场) (بارلىق تېغى تاستى ئورمانچىلىق مەيدانى) (بارلىق تاۋى تاستى ورمان الاڭىنداعى)
- XPCC 170th Regiment (兵团一百七〇团)(170-تۇەن مەيدانى) (170-تۋان الاڭىنداعى)

== Climate ==
Climate data for Toli, elevation 1,094 m (3,589 ft), (1991–2020 normals, extremes 1981–2010)
Month	Jan	Feb	Mar	Apr	May	Jun	Jul	Aug	Sep	Oct	Nov	Dec	Year
Record high °C (°F)	9.3 (48.7)	8.8 (47.8)	22.1 (71.8)	29.2 (84.6)	34.3 (93.7)	35.5 (95.9)	38.3 (100.9)	37.0 (98.6)	34.1 (93.4)	28.5 (83.3)	17.5 (63.5)	11.1 (52.0)	38.3 (100.9)
Mean daily maximum °C (°F)	−4.3 (24.3)	−2.0 (28.4)	4.6 (40.3)	14.7 (58.5)	20.5 (68.9)	25.5 (77.9)	27.4 (81.3)	26.6 (79.9)	20.9 (69.6)	12.9 (55.2)	3.3 (37.9)	−2.8 (27.0)	12.3 (54.1)
Daily mean °C (°F)	−10.4 (13.3)	−7.9 (17.8)	−0.9 (30.4)	8.7 (47.7)	14.5 (58.1)	19.7 (67.5)	21.6 (70.9)	20.4 (68.7)	14.7 (58.5)	6.6 (43.9)	−2.1 (28.2)	−8.2 (17.2)	6.4 (43.5)
Mean daily minimum °C (°F)	−14.6 (5.7)	−12.3 (9.9)	−5.1 (22.8)	3.9 (39.0)	9.2 (48.6)	14.4 (57.9)	16.4 (61.5)	15.1 (59.2)	9.4 (48.9)	2.1 (35.8)	−5.8 (21.6)	−12.1 (10.2)	1.7 (35.1)
Record low °C (°F)	−31.0 (−23.8)	−32.4 (−26.3)	−26.5 (−15.7)	−12.8 (9.0)	−6.0 (21.2)	2.5 (36.5)	8.2 (46.8)	2.5 (36.5)	−4.9 (23.2)	−17.8 (0.0)	−33.4 (−28.1)	−32.0 (−25.6)	−33.4 (−28.1)
Average precipitation mm (inches)	8.0 (0.31)	7.8 (0.31)	9.7 (0.38)	20.1 (0.79)	31.6 (1.24)	42.1 (1.66)	48.1 (1.89)	34.4 (1.35)	23.1 (0.91)	14.8 (0.58)	15.9 (0.63)	10.9 (0.43)	266.5 (10.48)
Average precipitation days (≥ 0.1 mm)	8.0	8.0	8.1	8.7	8.6	10.6	12.6	9.3	6.6	7.3	9.1	9.4	106.3
Average snowy days	10.7	10.8	9.3	3.1	0.5	0	0	0	0.4	3.9	11.0	12.8	62.5
Average relative humidity (%)	66	66	64	51	44	44	46	43	45	56	68	68	55
Mean monthly sunshine hours	168.5	184.0	236.0	253.3	303.7	299.8	303.4	300.9	262.6	222.9	155.7	142.8	2,833.6
Percentage possible sunshine	59	62	63	61	65	64	65	70	72	68	56	53	63
Source: China Meteorological Administration
