= Election recount =

Recount of votes, due to close margins or human errors

An election recount is a repeat tabulation of votes cast in an election that is used to determine the correctness of an initial count. Recounts will often take place if the initial vote tally during an election is extremely close. Election recounts will often result in changes in contest tallies. Errors can be found or introduced from human factors, such as transcription errors, or machine errors, such as misreads of paper ballots.

== Australia ==
Australian elections use instant-runoff voting and single transferable vote at the federal level to determine representatives for the House of Representatives and the Senate respectively. Tabulating votes for both houses involves automatic recounts known as "fresh scrutiny". For the House, this process occurs the Monday after a general election. The process in the Senate occurs shortly after the election, but only first preferences are recounted. A voter's full preferences for the Senate are not counted until after fresh scrutiny occurs. Candidates for either house may also request recounts, though such a request may be refused by the Electoral Commission.

Similar processes occur at the state and territorial level. As in federal elections, candidates may request recounts subject to the discretion of electoral authorities.

== Canada ==
Recounts in Canadian elections are formal process oversaw by judges, and therefore are often referred to as "judicial recounts". For federal elections and the provincials of most provinces and territories, recounts are overseen by judges of the superior trial courts. Recounts or provincial elections in Ontario, Quebec, Prince Edward Island, and for territorial elections in Nunavut are oversee by judges of the provincial or territorial courts.

Recounts are conducted automatically if the difference between the vote tallies of the first and second place candidates falls below a certain threshold. In federal elections, tied elections or races with a difference of 0.1% result in automatic recounts. Electors, including candidates, may also petition an appropriate court for recounts within specific time limits following the election under certain conditions.

The threshold, time limit, conditions that may justify the granting of a recount, and which court would oversee the recount are prescribed by the relevant legislation governing the election in question. Each province and territory has its own applicable legislation governing their election, and some have separate legislations prescribing different rules for recounts in municipal elections.

=== Comparison of rules for election recounts ===
Province/Territory	Difference threshold for automatic recount	Time limit	Overseeing court
Canada	0.1% (1/1000) of all valid votes cast	Within four days of validation of results	The superior trial court in the relevant province or territory.
Newfoundland and Labrador	10 votes	Within ten days of the final tally	Supreme Court of Newfoundland and Labrador
Prince Edward Island	10 votes (or 15 votes at the request of a candidate)	Within five days of the returning officer has distributed the statement of official results	Provincial Court of Prince Edward Island
Nova Scotia	10 votes	Within four days of the returning officer has distributed the statement of official results	Supreme Court of Nova Scotia
New Brunswick	None	Within four days of a candidate declared elected	Court of King's Bench of New Brunswick
Quebec	only in cases of tie-vote (or 1/1000 of votes cast at the request of the second place candidate)	Within four days of the final tally, if difference is less than 0.1% (1/1000 of votes cast)	Court of Québec
Ontario	25 votes	Within four days (excluding Sunday) of the official tabulation	Ontario Court of Justice
Manitoba	50 votes	Within six days of a candidate is declared elected	Manitoba Court of King's Bench
Saskatchewan	The sum of the number of ballots rejected, ballots objected to and unopened ballot envelopes	Within ten days of a candidate declared elected	Court of King's Bench for Saskatchewan
Alberta	100 votes	Within eight days after the announcement of official results	Court of King's Bench of Alberta
British Columbia	0.2% (1/500th) of all ballots considered	Within six days of the final tally	Supreme Court of BC
Yukon	10 votes	Within six days of the final tally	Supreme Court of Yukon
Northwest Territories	2% of total votes cast	Within five "business days" of the final tally	Supreme Court of the Northwest Territories
Nunavut	2% of total votes cast	Within eight days of declaration of result	Nunavut Court of Justice

=== Rarity of changes ===
It is extremely rare for elections to be overturned by recounts. In the twelve federal elections that took place between 1988 and 2015, judicial recounts was conducted or commenced in 50 instances (Note: One additional recount was granted in 2000 to Canadian Alliance Candidate Don Leier who was behind veteran NDP MP Lorne Nystrom by 164 votes. Leier abandoned the recount prior to its commencement.). Election outcomes were changed by recounts in four instances.

Year	Electoral District	Candidate	Results			Note
Year	Electoral District	Candidate	Prelim (Note: Preliminary results referred to the complete results Elections Canada recorded with all polls reporting, but before the validation process. It does not refer to eletions night results reported by media, which are often incomplete.)	Validated (Note: Validation is a process mandated by law, where the Returning Officer for an electoral district reviews the result reports from all polls in presence of candidate representatives to ensure they were accurately recorded. No examination of ballots take place in this process.)	Recount	Note
2025	(Newfoundland and Labrador) Terra Nova—The Peninsulas	Anthony Germain	19,704	19,704	19,593	
2025	(Newfoundland and Labrador) Terra Nova—The Peninsulas	Jonathan Rowe	19,692	19,692	19,605	
2021	(Quebec) Châteauguay--Lacolle	Patrick O'Hara	18,368	18,028	18,017	
2021	(Quebec) Châteauguay--Lacolle	Brenda Shanahan	17,762	17,742	18,029	
2008	(Quebec) Brossard–La Prairie	Marcel Lussier	19,200	19,202	19,034	
2008	(Quebec) Brossard–La Prairie	Alexandra Mendès	19,057	19,100	19,103	
1988	(Ontario) York North	Maurizio Bevilacqua	37,513	37,502	35,917	Outcome changed again on a second recount to Bevilacqua defeating O'Brien 37,513 to 37,436. The election was later annulled.
1988	(Ontario) York North	Micheal O'Brien	37,436	37,436	36,016	Outcome changed again on a second recount to Bevilacqua defeating O'Brien 37,513 to 37,436. The election was later annulled.

The changes of outcome in the 2008 and 2021 recounts were not entirely unexpected as apparent errors were identified in advance of the actual recount. In 2021, incumbent Liberal MP Brenda Shanahan was granted a recount despite being behind by a few hundred votes on having identified an apparent error relating to one ballot box. The error was confirmed during the recount confirmed and its correction singly change the margin by 370.

The 1988 recount for York North was conducted on November 30 and Progressive Conservative Micheal O'Brien was sworn in as MP. However, on appeal two weeks later the Ontario High Court ruled that the recount judged erred in excluding approximately 3,000 ballots and order a second recount with those ballots included. The second recount took place on January 11, 1989 and resulted in Bevilacqua defeating O'Brien 37,513 to 37,436. This was the first and so far the only time that an MP was vacated from their seat by recount after having been seated. O'Brien later successfully contested the election (see below), in doing so created an unprecedented situation where two MPs were unseated from a single election.

=== Distinction from contested elections ===
Judicial recount are often conflated with contested elections in news reports and punditry. Recounts deal solely with the tabulation and counting of votes. Judges primarily adjudicate dispute over whether ballots are valid for counting, and concern themselves with the accuracy of the counting and tabulation. Recounts judges do not deal with concerns about irregularities, voters eligibilities, and other more serious allegations, and may not grant remedies to address any circumstances that may have compromised the fairness or integrity of the election process. Those concerns are addressed through a contested election application.

Elections were frequently overturned in Canada in the 1800s under the Dominion Controverted Elections Act, for corrupted practices such as bribery, treating (providing refreshment as a quid pro quo), and undue influence. That act was repealed in 2000 and was replaced by part 20 of the Canada Elections Act. With the introduction of the secret ballot, single-day cross the country, and certain unlawful campaign conduct explicitly codified, contested elections has become exceedingly rare. Since the 1970s, only two federal elections were successfully overturned for reasons not relating to counting.

- The 1988 election in York North, already changed twice by recounts, was annulled by the Ontario High Court in May 1990. Bevilacqua won the subsequent by-election held in December, 1990.
- The election of Liberal Tatiana Auguste in Terrebonne in the 2025 Canadian federal election was upheld by judicial recount but was annulled by the Supreme Court of Canada, the first time the country's top court unseated an MP in over eighty years. She regained the seat in the subsequent by-election held in April 2026.

== Ireland ==
In Irish presidential elections, recounts occur only at the approval of the High Court. Candidates or the Director of Public Prosecutions may petition for a recount within seven days of the election. In the event of a recount, the High Court's decision is final. An identical process is available for elections to the Oireachtas.

== New Zealand ==
New Zealand uses a mixed-member proportional representation system for elections to its Parliament. As in Australia, an official count takes place shortly after the election day involving a recount of all of the ballots in electorates. Judicial recounts are also available in electorate and party list races. No threshold is needed for a recount to occur.

== Singapore ==
Elections in Singapore are determined through a First-past-the-post voting, with the candidate receiving the most votes being declared candidate-elect (or in the case of Group Representation Constituencies, a team of candidates-elect via General ticket, disregarding the number of divisions won). In all cases, recounts are overseen by the Returning officer, and it is automatically triggered whenever the margin of difference is within 2% (valid local votes only, excluding spoilt or tendered votes). Prior to the 2020 election, candidates are only allowed only one application for a recount.

While Singapore adopts Non-resident citizen voting, if a recount of votes resulted in a margin that would involve overseas votes (where the difference is within the total overseas electorate), the overseas votes would apply. In typical cases, recounts are not applied for overseas votes if results are already declared.

== United States ==
In the United States recounts rarely reverse election results. Of the 4,687 statewide general elections held from 2000 to 2015, 27 were followed by a recount, and only three resulted in a change of outcome from the original count: 2004 Washington gubernatorial election, 2006 Vermont Auditor of Accounts election, and 2008 United States Senate election in Minnesota. Recounts are conducted at the state level rather than the federal level, even for federal offices.

=== Recount methods ===
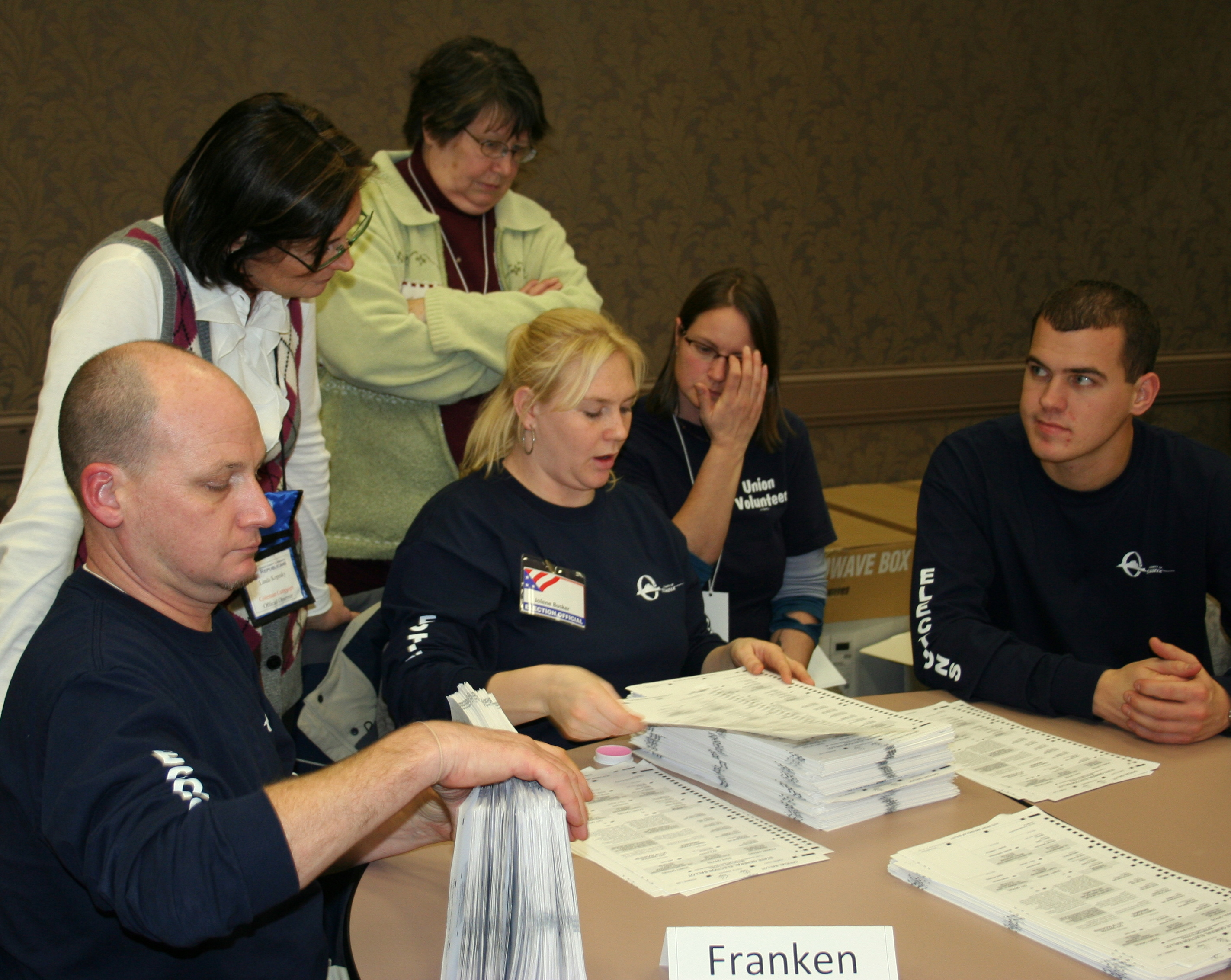
Recounting optical-scan ballots by hand in the United States Senate election in Minnesota, 2008.

==== Machine recount ====
A machine recount is a retabulation of ballots cast during the election. This can be done using an optical scan voting system, punched card system or direct-recording electronic (DRE) voting machine. With document-based Ballot Voting Systems, ballots are counted a second time by some form of machine. With Non-document-based Ballot Voting Systems officials will recollect vote data from each voting machine which will be combined by a central tabulation system.

==== Manual recount ====
A manual or "hand" recount involves each individual physical representation of voter intent being reviewed for voter intent by one or more individuals.

With DRE voting machines, a voter-verified paper audit trail (VVPAT) is examined from each voter. For some DREs that do not generate a VVPAT, images can be printed for each ballot cast and counted individually.

=== Legal requirements ===
Recounts can be mandatory or optional. In some jurisdictions, recounts are mandatory in the event the difference between the top two candidates is less than a percentage of votes cast or of a fixed number. Mandatory recounts are paid for by the elections official, or the state. Mandatory recounts can usually be waived by the apparent losing candidate. The winning side will usually encourage the loser to waive the recount in a show of unity and to avoid spending taxpayer money.

Each jurisdiction has different criteria for optional recounts. Some areas permit recounts for any office or measure, while others require that the margin of victory be less than a certain percentage before a recount is allowed. In all instances, optional recounts are paid for by the candidate, their political party, or, in some instances, by any interested voter. The person paying for the recount has the option to stop the recount at any time. If the recount reverses the election, the jurisdiction will then pay for the recount.

Rules for election recounts in U.S. states
State	Automatic	Requested
Alabama	When difference is less than 0.5%	Available to both candidates and voters; an election contest must be filed if the recount changes the result
Alaska	When tied	Available to both candidates and voters
Arizona	When difference is less than 0.1%	Not available
Arkansas	None	Available; the election commission may also initiate a recount
California	None	Available to voters; the governor may initiate a recount if difference is less than 1,000 votes or 0.1%
Colorado	When difference is less than 0.5%	Available
Connecticut	When difference is less than 20 votes or less than 2000 votes when said difference is less than 0.5%	Available; election officials may initiate recounts
Delaware	When difference is less than 1,000 votes or less than 0.5% (whichever is smaller) (municipal elections - only if difference is less than 0.5%)	Available, if difference is less than 1,000 votes or less than 0.5% (whichever is smaller); voters can initiate in school board elections only
Florida	When difference is less than 0.5%	Available
Georgia	None	Available, if difference is less than 0.5%
Hawaii	None	Available through the Supreme Court
Idaho	None	Available, if difference is less than 0.1% or 5 votes (whichever is larger)
Illinois	None	Available, if difference is less than 5% (non-binding unless court-ordered); voters can initiate on ballot measures only
Indiana	None	Available
Iowa	None	Available, if difference is less than 1% or 50 votes (whichever is larger)
Kansas	None	Available, if difference is less than 0.5%
Kentucky	None	Available, unless an election for Governor, Lieutenant Governor, or General Assembly member
Louisiana	None	Available, if difference is less than the total number of absentee and early ballots
Maine	None	Available, if difference is less than 1.5% (legislative races) or less than 1% or 1,000 votes (whichever is smaller) (statewide races)
Maryland	None	Available, if difference is less than 0.1%
Massachusetts	None	Available, if difference is less than 0.5%
Michigan	When difference is less than 2000 votes	Available
Minnesota	None	Available, if difference is less than 0.25% (federal, statewide, and judicial races) or less than 0.5% (legislative races) or less than 10 votes (when total number is less than 400 votes)
Mississippi	None	Not available
Missouri	None	Available, if difference is less than 0.5% (state and federal races) or less than 1% (local races)
Montana	When tied	Available, if difference less than 0.25%; state pays costs
Nebraska	When difference is less than 1% (if more than 500 total votes) or less than 2% (if 500 total votes or less)	Available
Nevada	None	Available
New Hampshire	None	Available, if difference is less than 20%
New Jersey	None	Available
New Mexico	When difference is less than 0.25% (federal and statewide races) or less than 0.5% (judicial races and certain local races) or less than 1% (all other races)	Available (voters may initiate only under the Liquor Control Act)
New York	When difference is less than 20 votes or less than 0.5% or less than 5,000 votes (if more than 1 million votes)	Available for local races only
North Carolina	None	Available, if difference is less than 0.5% or less than 10,000 votes (whichever is less) (statewide races) or less than 1% (all other races)
North Dakota	When difference is less than 1% (primaries) or less than 0.5% (general elections)	Available, if difference is less than 2%
Ohio	When difference is less than 0.25% (statewide races) or less than 0.5% (all other races)	Available
Oklahoma	None	Available
Oregon	When difference is less than 0.2%	Available
Pennsylvania	When difference is less than 0.5%	Available
Rhode Island	None	Available (margin dependent on total number of votes cast)
South Carolina	When difference is less than 1%	Not available
South Dakota	When tied	Available, if difference is less than 0.25% (statewide races) or less than 2% (all other races)
Tennessee	None	Available by court order only
Texas	When tied	Available, if difference is less than 10%
Utah	None	Available, if difference less than 0.25% or if difference is only one (when <400 total votes were cast)
Vermont	When tied	Available, if difference is less than 2% or less than 5% (municipal and state representative races)
Virginia	None	Available, if difference is less than 1%; if difference is less than 0.5%, state pays costs
Washington	When difference is less than 2,000 votes or less than 0.5%	Available
West Virginia	None	Available
Wisconsin	None	Available; if difference is less than 0.25%, state pays costs
Wyoming	When difference is less than 1%	Available

=== Notable recounts ===
- Florida election recount - 2000 U.S. presidential election
- Washington gubernatorial election, 2004
- Vermont Auditor of Accounts election, 2006
- United States House of Representatives elections in Florida, 2006#District 13 - Florida's 13th congressional district
- United States Senate election in Minnesota, 2008
- Virginia Attorney General election, 2013
- 2016 United States presidential election recounts
- 2018 United States Senate election in Florida
- 2020 United States presidential election in Georgia

== United Kingdom ==
More than one recount is allowed if a candidate or their agent requests one and the returning officer deems it appropriate. It is possible for a defeated candidate denied a recount by the Returning Officer, to request one from the court by means of an election petition. There are several cases where a Parliamentary election has been the subject of a court-ordered recount.

== See also ==
- Risk-limiting audit
- Electoral fraud
