= Sinclair-Desgagné v. Canada (Chief Electoral Officer) =

Supreme Court of Canada case on voting rights

- Supreme Court of Canada

Hearing: February 16, 2026 Judgment: February 16, 2026
- Full case name: Nathalie Sinclair-Desgagné and Chief Electoral Officer of Canada, Returning Officer for the Electoral District of Terrebonne, Tatiana Auguste and Adrienne Charles
- Docket No.: 42076
- Ruling: Appeal allowed; election in Terrebonne annulled

Court membership
- Chief Justice: Richard Wagner; Puisne Justices: Andromache Karakatsanis, Suzanne Côté, Malcolm Rowe, Sheilah Martin, Nicholas Kasirer, Mahmud Jamal, Michelle O'Bonsawin, Mary Moreau

Reasons given
- Majority: Jamal (Wagner, Côté, Rowe, Kasirer, O'Bonsawin concurring)
- Dissent: Karakatsanis and Martin (joint; Moreau concurring)

Laws applied
- Canada Elections Act, SC 2000, c. 9

Sinclair-Desgagné v. Canada (Chief Electoral Officer) is a decision of the Supreme Court of Canada in relation to a contested election in the riding of Terrebonne, Quebec, in the 2025 federal election. After the recount process, it came down to one vote, with the Liberal party candidate declared elected, defeating the incumbent Bloc Québécois candidate, Nathalie Sinclair-Desgagné. A voter in the riding came forward during the recount process and said she had attempted to vote by mail for the unsuccessful candidate, Sinclair-Desgagné, but had her ballot returned. Based on that information, Sinclair-Desgagné brought a judicial contest to the election result. The Quebec Superior Court ruled that the error with respect to one mail-in ballot had occurred, but did not overturn the result.

The Canada Elections Act provides that in contested elections, there is a direct appeal from the trial court to the Supreme Court of Canada. Sinclair-Desgagné appealed to the Supreme Court, which heard the appeal on February 16, 2026. The court granted the appeal from the bench by a majority, with reasons to follow. The court annulled the election in Terrebonne, setting the stage for a by-election, which the Liberal candidate won.

On September 18, 2026, the Supreme Court delivered its reasons for judgment. By a 6-3 split, the court held that the situation amounted to an irregularity, serious enough for the court to set aside the election.

== Facts of the case ==
=== Terrebonne and the 2025 federal election ===
A federal general election was held on April 28, 2025, to elect members to the federal House of Commons. All 343 seats were up for election, which was hotly contested. The Conservative Party of Canada, led by Pierre Poilievre, had been leading in the polls in 2024 and early 2025 and had been favoured to win the election. The situation changed with the sudden resignation of Prime Minister Justin Trudeau of the Liberal Party and the ongoing trade war with the United States resulting from President Trump's imposition of tariffs on Canada. Trudeau was replaced as leader and prime minister by Mark Carney, who called the election shortly after his appointment as prime minister. Polls began to show that the Liberals were regaining support and the Conservatives were dropping.

Terrebonne is a riding in the province of Quebec, in the Montreal area. It sends one member to the federal House of Commons, elected on a first-past-the-post vote. The incumbent going into the election was Nathalie Sinclair-Desgagné of the Bloc Québécois, a Quebec nationalist party.

On election night, the vote in Terrebonne was very close, flipping back and forth between Sinclair-Desgagné and the candidate for the Liberal Party, Tatiana Auguste, as the evening progressed. The initial vote count put Auguste ahead of Sinclair-Desgagné by 35 votes, but a subsequent review by the elections officials put Sinclair-Desgagné in the lead by 44 votes. Given the close result (less than 0.1 per cent of votes cast), there was an automatic judicial recount. That recount declared Auguste the winner, by one vote.

The election result in Terrebonne had national significance, as the initial results showed the Liberals had been re-elected with 169 seats in the House of Commons, three seats short of a majority government. There had been other ridings with close results which were also going through recounts. The results of those recounts could bring the Liberals closer to forming a majority government.

=== The returned ballot ===
While the review process was going on, a voter in the Terrebonne riding came forward, stating that she had attempted to vote by postal ballot, but the ballot had been returned uncounted. The reason was that there was an error in the pre-addressed envelope from Elections Canada, to be used to return her ballot once she had filled it in. The envelope prepared by Elections Canada had the wrong postal code and therefore was returned as undeliverable. She had marked her ballot for Sinclair-Gagné, the candidate for the Bloc Québécois.

After the judicial recount had resulted in the Liberal candidate winning by one vote, Sinclair-Gagné and the Bloc Québécois decided to contest the election, based on the returned ballot. The judicial recount had only counted the ballots, but the judge on that recount did not have jurisdiction to consider election irregularities, and there was no right of appeal from the judicial recount. The application by Sinclair-Gagné was to contest the outcome based on the returned ballot.

== Decision of the Superior Court ==
Sinclair-Gagné began the judicial contestation on May 23, 2025, in the Superior Court of Quebec, as permitted by the Canada Elections Act. The parties to the judicial proceedings were Sinclair-Gagné, Auguste, and the Chief Electoral Officer of Canada. The contest was primarily between the two candidates, as the Chief Electoral Officer did not take a position on the outcome, limiting his submissions to explaining the electoral process and vote-counting reviews for the court's assistance. The defeated candidate for the Conservative Party also participated, supporting Sinclair-Gagné's position.

On October 27, 2025, the Superior Court gave its decision, rejecting the challenge. Justice Dufour held that the error on the pre-addressed ballot was a simple human error, not rising to the level of election irregularity. As well, he concluded that the voter had had options to ensure her ballot was counted. He held that the voter could have gone to the local electoral office to verify her vote, or could have gone to the polls and voted in person. As a result, he rejected the challenge.

== Appeal to the Supreme Court of Canada ==
The Canada Elections Act provides that there is a direct appeal from the lower court decision to the Supreme Court of Canada. The act directs that the Supreme Court shall hear the appeal "... without delay and in a summary manner."

The Supreme Court heard the appeal on February 16, 2026, with the full court of nine justices sitting. In their oral questions from the bench, several of the judges seemed sceptical of the argument advanced by Auguste's lawyer in support of the Superior Court decision, who argued that an unintentional error in a postal code was not an "irregularity" as required by the Canada Elections Act as the test for overturning an election. Chief Justice Richard Wagner interrupted him: "Hold on a minute. The purpose of the law is to promote public participation at a time in history when institutions are under strain." Justice Malcolm Rowe commented that the responsibility for the error was "totally clear", falling on Elections Canada.

At the conclusion of the hearing, Chief Justice Wagner announced the decision of the Court. He stated that the appeal was allowed, by a majority, and the election in Terrebonne was annulled. He stated that the Court's reasons would follow at a later date.

== Reasons for judgment ==
On September 18, 2026, the Supreme Court delievered its reasons for judgment. By a 6-3 split, the court explained why it allowed the appeal.

=== Majority by Justice Jamal ===
Justice Jamal wrote the majority decision. He held that: (1) irregularities do not need to be intentional, and negligence can amount to an irregularity; (2) the irregularity could have affected the outcome of the election; (3) if those two factors were met, the court had discretion to annul the election. The onus of proof lay with the challenger for each stage. Justice Jamal for the majority held that all three requirements were met.

=== Dissent by Justice Karakatsanis and Martin ===
Justices Karakatsanis and Martin wrote a joint dissent (Justice Moreau concurring).

== Impact ==
The SCC expanded on the Opitz test it devised in its 2012 ruling in the contested result in Etobicoke Centre arising from the 2011 Canadian federal election.

| Steps in the Opitz test | As applied in Sinclair-Desgagné |
|---|---|
| "[A]n applicant must prove that there was an “irregularity”: breach of a statutory provision designed to establish a person’s entitlement to vote." | "[T]he postal code error, combined with Elections Canada’s failure to correct it for over three weeks before election day, was a serious administrative error and therefore an irregularity under s. 524(1)(b).... Elections Canada caused the error and had the ability and responsibility to correct it." |
| [A]n applicant must demonstrate that the irregularity “affected the result” of the election: someone not entitled to vote, voted. Where that is established, the vote is invalid, and must be rejected. | "[T]he irregularity affected the result of the election by improperly preventing an elector from voting." |
| "If a court is satisfied that, because of the rejection of certain votes, the winner is in doubt, it would be unreasonable for the court not to annul the election." | "[J]udicial discretion must be exercised to annul the election because the number of affected votes (one) exactly equals the margin of victory (one), leaving doubt as to the winner of the election." |

The reasons diverged on the issue of what constituted an irregularity in the Canada Elections Act. The majority held that "irregularities", as noted in s. 524(1)(b), were distinct from the "fraud or corrupt or illegal practices" that were also given as grounds for contesting an election. Citing Opitz, it stated that "an irregularity must be serious and capable of undermining electoral integrity; it need not involve dishonest intent or bad faith". The minority, believing that the bar was thus set too low, did not consider this incident to constitute a serious administrative error, and it also stated that it was up to the elector to ensure that, under s. 240(b), the ballot was "received or cast by alternative means".

Following the release of the Court's reasons, Elections Canada issued a statement, saying that the decision would be reviewed to determine what actions the agency should then take.

Initial reaction to the decision was generally favourable. One commentator noted, "What the majority has done is recognize a specific mischief – admitted inattention to a known, correctable official error – with consequences that could not be ignored, and, on that narrow basis, annul very reluctantly".

== Subsequent events ==
A by-election was held in Terrebonne on April 13, 2026. This time, Auguste won the riding for the Liberals by over 700 votes, leading Sinclair-Desgagné to acknowledge her defeat. There were another two by-elections in Toronto, Ontario, the same day, which the Liberals also won. Following the by-elections and defections by members of Parliament who crossed the floor from the Conservative Party, the Liberals gained a majority in the House of Commons.
