= 2025 Canadian federal election in Quebec =

- April 28, 2025

All 78 Quebec seats in the House of Commons of Canada
- Opinion polls
- Registered: 6,664,620
- Turnout: 4,457,743 (66.89%) ▲4.52%
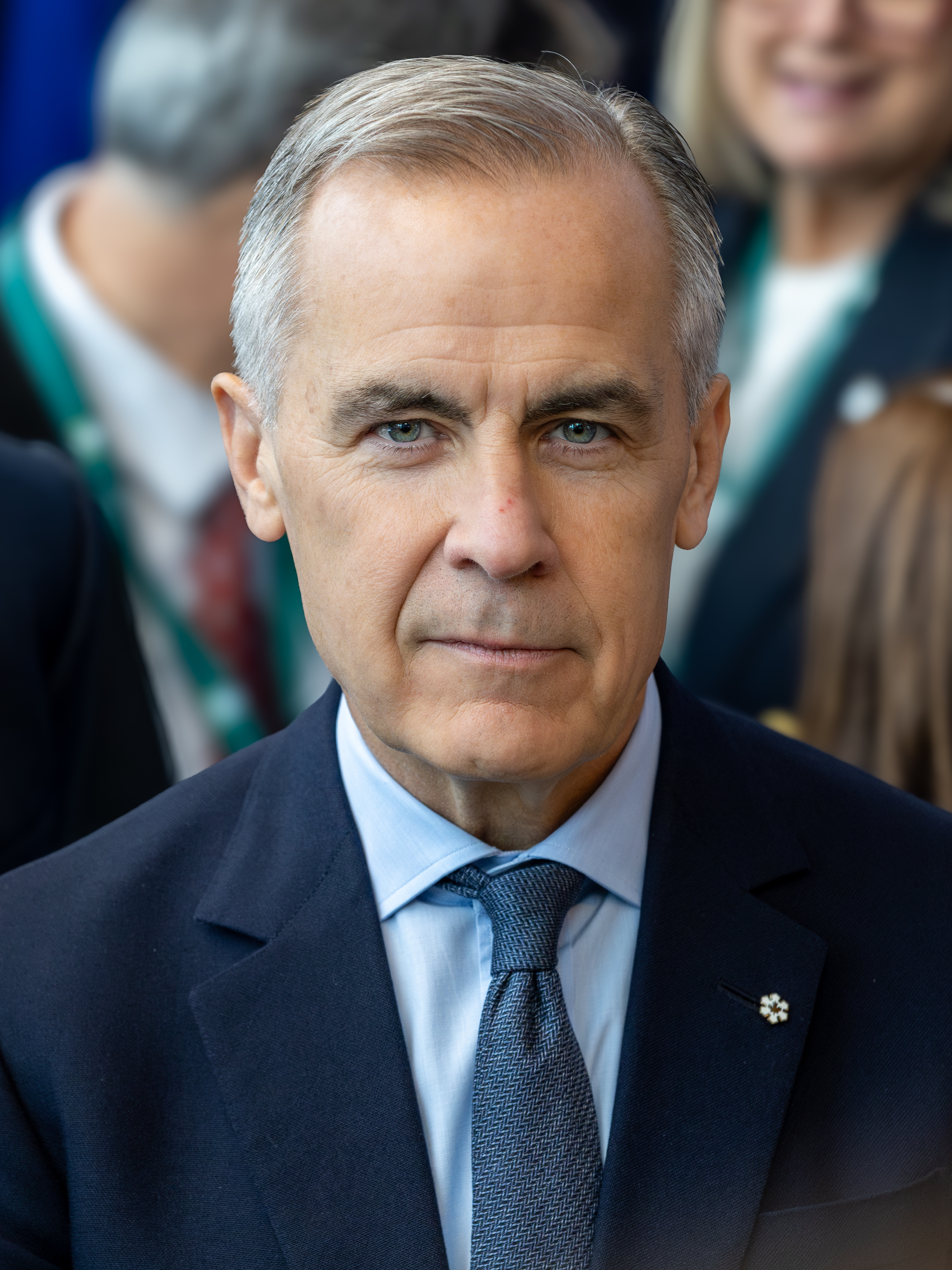

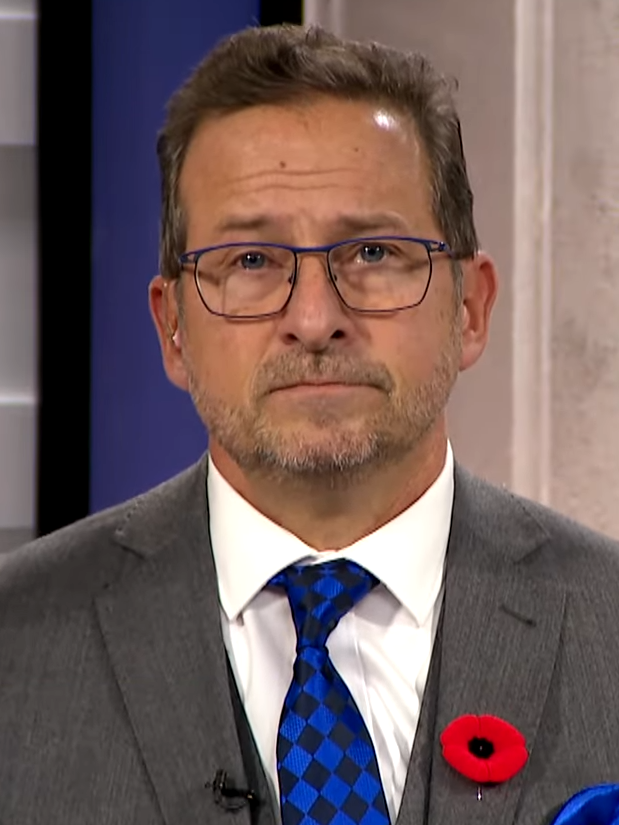

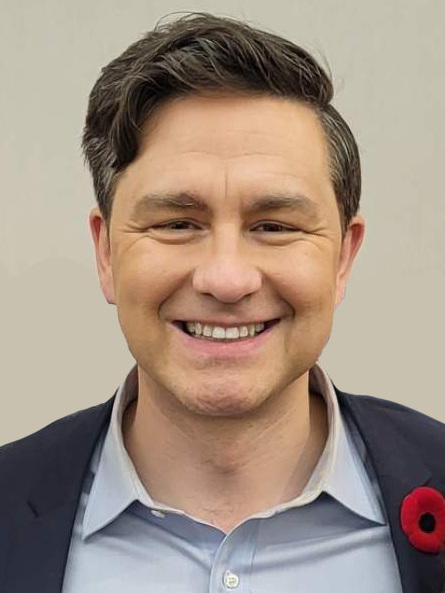

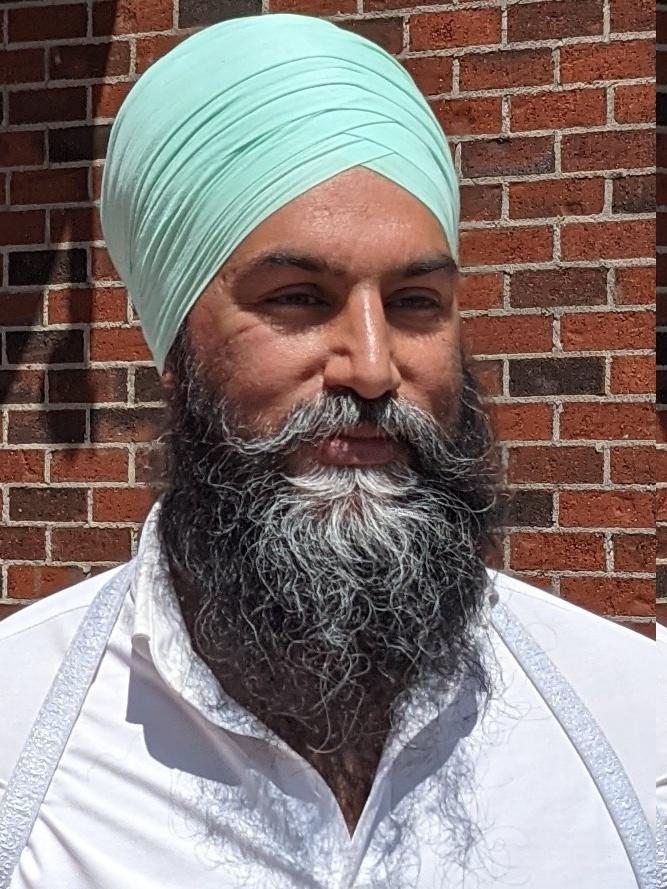
	First party	Second party
Leader	Mark Carney	Yves-François Blanchet
Party	Liberal	Bloc Québécois
Leader since	March 9, 2025	January 17, 2019
Last election	35 seats, 33.6%	32 seats, 32.1%
Seats before	33	33
Seats won	44 (Note: The Supreme Court of Canada overturned the results in Terrebonne in February 2026, causing the 2026 Terrebonne federal by-election to be called, which the Liberals won)	22
Seat change	▲11	▼11
Popular vote	1,897,526	1,236,349
Percentage	42.6%	27.7%
Swing	▲9.0 pp	▼4.4 pp
	Third party	Fourth party
Leader	Pierre Poilievre	Jagmeet Singh
Party	Conservative	New Democratic
Leader since	September 10, 2022	October 1, 2017
Last election	10 seats, 18.6%	1 seats, 9.8%
Seats before	9	1
Seats won	11	1
Seat change	▲2	Steady
Popular vote	1,038,315	200,393
Percentage	23.3%	4.5%
Swing	▲4.7 pp	▼5.3 pp
Liberal
30–35%
35–40%
40–45%
45–50%
50–55%
55–60%
60–65%
65–70%
Bloc Québécois
30–35%
35–40%
40–45%
45–50%
50–55%
55–60%
60–65%
65–70%
Conservative
30–35%
35–40%
40–45%
45–50%
50–55%
55–60%
60–65%
65–70%
Prime Minister before election
Mark Carney
Liberal
Prime Minister after election
Mark Carney
Liberal

In the 2025 Canadian federal election, there were 78 members of Parliament elected to the House of Commons from the province of Quebec, making up 22.7% of all members of the House.

== Background ==
=== 2022 electoral redistribution ===
The 2025 Canadian federal election was the first election to utilize the electoral districts established following the 2022 Canadian federal electoral redistribution. The House of Commons increased from 338 seats to 343 seats, with Quebec's number of seats remaining steady at 78. Originally the province was set to lose 1 seat, with 77 total. But with the passage of the Preserving Provincial Representation in the House of Commons Act, the province will now always be guaranteed at least 78 seats. This made the average population per constituency in Quebec 108,998 (according to the 2021 Canadian census), which was 1,150 more people per electoral district than the national average.

2021 results transposed onto 2023 boundaries
Party	MPs		
Party	2021 actual result	2021 notional result	Change
Liberal	35	33	▼2
Bloc Québécois	32	34	▲2
Conservative	10	10	0
New Democratic	1	1	0
Total seats	78	78	0

=== Timeline ===
Changes in Quebec seats held (2021–2025)
Seat	Before				Change		
Seat	Date	Member	Party	Reason	Date	Member	Party
Richmond—Arthabaska	September 13, 2022	Alain Rayes	█ Conservative	Left caucus			█ Independent
Notre-Dame-de-Grâce—Westmount	March 8, 2023	Marc Garneau	█ Liberal	Retired	June 19, 2023	Anna Gainey	█ Liberal
LaSalle—Émard—Verdun	February 1, 2024	David Lametti	█ Liberal	Resigned to join law firm	September 16, 2024	Louis-Philippe Sauvé	█ Bloc Québécois
Honoré-Mercier	September 19, 2024	Pablo Rodriguez	█ Liberal	Left caucus			█ Independent
Honoré-Mercier	January 20, 2025	Pablo Rodriguez	█ Independent	Resigned to run for the leadership of the Quebec Liberal Party	Vacant until the 2025 election		█ Vacant

=== Opinion polling ===
Opinion polling During the election campaign

Polling firm	Last date of polling	Link	LPC	CPC	NDP	BQ	GPC	PPC	Others	Margin of error (Note: In cases when linked poll details distinguish between the margin of error associated with the total sample of respondents (including undecided and non-voters) and that of the subsample of decided/leaning voters, the former is included in the table. Also not included is the margin of error created by rounding to the nearest whole number or any margin of error from methodological sources. Most online polls (because of their opt-in method of recruiting panelists which results in a non-random sample) cannot have a margin of error. In such cases, shown is what the margin of error would be for a survey using a random probability-based sample of equivalent size.)	Sample size (Note: Refers to the total, "raw" sample size, including undecided and non-voters, and before demographic weighting is applied. Fractions in parentheses apply to rolling polls (see below) and indicate the proportion of the sample that is independent from the previous poll in the series.)	Polling method (Note: "Telephone" refers to traditional telephone polls conducted by live interviewers; "IVR" refers to automated Interactive Voice Response polls conducted by telephone; "online" refers to polls conducted exclusively over the internet; "telephone/online" refers to polls which combine results from both telephone and online surveys, or for which respondents are initially recruited by telephone and then asked to complete an online survey. "Rolling" polls contain overlapping data from one poll to the next.)	Lead
Leger	April 25, 2025		42	24	5	26	2	1	—N/a		893	Online	16
Synopsis	April 11, 2025		42	21	7	27	1	2	—N/a		1,000	Online	15
Leger	March 10, 2025		36	24	8	25	4	2	1	± 3.09pp	1,007	Online	11
Leger	February 2, 2025		29	24	12	29	3	3	1	± 3.07 pp	1,017	Online	0
Leger	January 19, 2025		21	26	7	37	4	2	1	± 3.09 pp	1,003	Online	11
Leger	December 2, 2024		22	22	15	35	4	1	2	± 3.1 pp	1,002	Online	13
Leger	November 11, 2024		22	24	13	35	3	3	0	± 3.08 pp	1,010	Online	11
Leger	October 6, 2024		27	22	11	35	3	1	0	± 3.04 pp	1,041	Online	8
Leger	August 25, 2024		27	23	14	29	5	3	0	± 3.04 pp	1,041	Online	2
Leger	June 3, 2024		26	26	11	31	4	1	1	± 3.08 pp	1,015	Online	5
Leger	April 21, 2024		26	24	10	35	2	2	1	± 3.05 pp	1,026	Online	9
Pallas Data	April 8, 2024		25.3	26.2	9.9	28.6	0.7	2.2	0.6	± 2 pp	700	IVR	2.4
Leger	March 18, 2024		27	23	14	30	3	2	1	± 3.05 pp	1,033	Online	3
Leger	February 6, 2024		28	24	14	29	3	2	1	± 3.05 pp	1,032	Online	1
Leger	December 4, 2023		28	25	10	31	2	2	2	± 3.04 pp	846	Online	3
Pallas Data	September 27, 2023		34	25	7	28	3	2	1	± 2.96 pp	1,095	IVR	6
Leger	September 25, 2023		29	23	13	29	2	1	—N/a	± 3.0 pp	1,046	Online	0
Leger	February 26, 2023		33	15	13	31	4	2	—N/a	± 3.0 pp	1,044	Online	2
Leger	November 6, 2022		34	18	12	30	2	2	—N/a	± 3.1 pp	1,028	Online	4

== Results ==
Quebec summary seat results in the 2025 Canadian federal election
Party	Votes	Vote %	Vote +/-	Seats	Seat +/-
Liberal	1,897,526	42.6%	▲9.0pp	44 / 78 (56%)	▲11
Bloc Québécois	1,232,853	27.7%	▼4.4pp	22 / 78 (28%)	▼11
Conservative	1,038,315	23.3%	▲4.7pp	11 / 78 (14%)	▲2
New Democratic	200,393	4.5%	▼5.3pp	1 / 78 (1%)	0
Green	40,909	0.9%	▼0.6pp	0 / 78 (0%)	0
People's	35,237	0.8%	▼1.9pp	0 / 78 (0%)	0
Independent	4,196	0.1%	▼0.1pp	0 / 78 (0%)	▼1
Other	8,818	0.2%	▼1.2pp	0 / 78 (0%)	0
Total	4,457,743	100%	–	78 / 78 (100%)	▲1 (Note: 1 seat was vacant at the dissolution of Parliament.)
Seat apportionment diagram:

=== Comparison with national results ===
Results by party
Party	Popular vote %			Seats in caucus
Party	QC	Natl. avg.	diff.	Seats in caucus
Liberal	42.6	43.8	-1.2	44 / 169 (26%)
Bloc Québécois	27.7	6.3	+21.4	22 / 22 (100%)
Conservative	23.3	41.3	-18.0	11 / 144 (8%)
New Democratic	4.5	6.3	-1.8	1 / 7 (14%)
Green	0.9	1.2	-0.3	0 / 1 (0%)
People's	0.8	0.7	+0.1	no caucus
Total	–	–	–	78 / 343 (23%)

== Student vote results ==
Student votes are mock elections that run parallel to actual elections, in which students not of voting age participate. They are administered by Student Vote Canada. These are for educational purposes and do not count towards the results.

Summary of the 2025 Canadian Student Vote in Quebec
Party	Leader	Seats			Popular vote		
Party	Leader	Elected	%	Δ	Votes	%	Δ (pp)
Liberal	Mark Carney	47	60.23	▲7	38,819	38.90	▲7.71
Bloc Québécois	Yves-François Blanchet	18	23.08	▼3	20,298	20.34	▲1.25
Conservative	Pierre Poilievre	11	14.10	▲2	19,738	19.78	▲6.68
New Democratic	Jagmeet Singh	2	2.56	▼5	11,814	11.84	▼9.47
Green	Elizabeth May & Jonathan Pedneault	0	0	▼1	4,147	4.16	▼2.84
People's	Maxime Bernier	0	0	0	2,588	2.59	▼0.41
Other		0	0	0	2,384	2.39	▼2.61
Total		78	100.00	0	99,788	100.00	–
Source: Student Vote Canada

== See also ==
- Terrebonne in the 2025 Canadian federal election
