= The RINJ Foundation =

International non-governmental organization

Rape Is No Joke (RINJ)
- Founded: 2012
- Type: RINJ is a private, international association of humanitarians including nurses, midwives, medics, EMS workers, doctors, lawyers and investigators.
- VAT ID no.: 8224455 (Canada)
- Purpose: Fighting for the safety of women and children.
- Location: Toronto, Ontario, Canada
- Region served: Global
- Product: Health Care, Advocacy for Women's Rights
- Method: Global Help Lines, Sexual Assault Clinics
- Members: 1,280,000
- Owner: Non-Profit self-owned
- Key people: Micheal O'Brien; Dale Carter; Geraldine Frisque; Alona Adamovich; Esther Tailfeathers; Katie Alsop; Sharon Santiago
- Website: rinj.org
- Formerly called: RINJ Campaign (2005–2012)

The RINJ Foundation (RINJ) is a Canadian incorporated global not-for-profit health care-related non-governmental organization women's group listed with the United Nations as an NGO

== Boycotts ==
RINJ encourages its members and the public at large to boycott entities RINJ says promote misogyny and sexual violence.

Among other boycotted misogyny/rape promoting "offenders" identified by RINJ were Facebook advertisers allegedly running advertisements on Facebook pages promoting rape ("rape pages"). RINJ joined forces with other organizations like "Women's Views on News" to organize boycotts of Facebook advertisers that ran advertisements on Facebook rape pages.

The RINJ Foundation women urged boycotts of broadcasters like Kyle Sandilands in Australia who reportedly attacked a female journalist making rude remarks about her breasts and threatening to "hunt her down". RINJ also went after Bill Cosby and sought a boycott of his shows in Canada protesting outdoors in January 2015 with "Rape Is No Joke" signs after rape allegations against Cosby became public in 2014.

== Safety of migrant female household workers ==
In April 2018, The RINJ Foundation asked the UN for sanctions against Kuwait in response to what it claimed are widespread sexual exploitation violations against migrant Filipino female workers in Kuwait.

== Prosecuting rape in war zones ==
The RINJ Foundation operates health care/rape clinics in and near war zones to apply its care, forensic evidence gathering and reporting protocols for sexual violence in areas of armed conflict where sexual violence patients are cared for and evidence is gathered about the rapists with the intent of prosecution. "The RINJ Foundation addresses impunity and identification of perpetrators of rape in armed conflicts and war."

== Warning communities of released sex offenders ==
The group assists communities in identifying newly released dangerous sex offenders.

== Reporting on threats to women and children ==
RINJ reports perpetrators of pervasive violence to the International Criminal Court (ICC) and has recently been cited as "calling on the international community to indict Philippines President Rodrigo Duterte for systematic extra-judicial killings that comprise crimes against humanity". and has challenged operators it says have contributed to child sex trade in war zones.

On February 24, 2017, the UN Committee on Non-Governmental Organizations in its 2017 regular session recommended The RINJ Foundation (Canada) for special Consultative Status to the Economic and Social Council. The Economic and Social Council (ECOSOC) at its Coordination and management meeting of 19 April 2017 adopted the recommendation of the Committee on Non-Governmental Organizations (NGOs) to grant special consultative status to The RINJ Foundation.

On June 21, 2017, RINJ launched its fifth annual international campaign to provide a surge to its ongoing abolitionist campaign against sexual slavery and child sex tourism.

== See also ==
- Mosul, Iraq women
- Rape culture
- Post-assault treatment of sexual assault victims
- GlobalMedic
- Nursing Students Without Borders
- Satmed
- Sexual Violence in Areas of Armed Conflict
- 2018 Kuwait–Philippines diplomatic crisis
