= Terrebonne in the 2025 Canadian federal election =

Contested election in riding of Terrebonne

- 28 April 2025

Riding of Terrebonne
- Registered: 89,725
- Turnout: 61,118 (68.12%)
	First party	Second party	Third party
	Lib	BQ	Con
Candidate	Tatiana Auguste	Nathalie Sinclair-Desgagné	Adrienne Charles
Party	Liberal	Bloc Québécois	Conservative
Popular vote	23,352	23,351	10,961
Percentage	38.741%	38.739%	18.18%
Swing	▲9.37pp	▼2.66pp	▲7.72pp
MP before election
Nathalie Sinclair-Desgagné
Bloc Québécois
Elected MP
Tatiana Auguste
Liberal

As part of the 2025 Canadian federal election on April 28, 2025, an election took place for the federal electoral district of Terrebonne in Quebec. The election was primarily between the incumbent MP, Nathalie Sinclair-Desgagné of the Bloc Québécois, and Tatiana Auguste, the candidate for the Liberal Party. Those two candidates together received more than three-quarters of the votes cast in the election. The Conservative Party candidate, Adrienne Charles, came in a distant third.

On election night, Auguste was initially ahead of Sinclair-Desgagné by 35 votes, but a standard review by Elections Canada officials later put Sinclair-Desgagné ahead by 44 votes. The extremely close margin of votes triggered an automatic judicial recount, which put Auguste ahead by one vote. She was declared elected by Elections Canada.

During the review process, a voter came forward who indicated that her postal vote for Sinclair-Desgagné had been returned uncounted, due to an error by Elections Canada in the return address. Sinclair-Desgagné and the Bloc Québécois brought a judicial challenge to the election. In October 2025, the Quebec Superior Court dismissed the judicial challenge. Sinclair-Desgagné then appealed to the Supreme Court of Canada which heard the appeal in February 2026. The Supreme Court allowed her appeal and annulled the election. A by-election was held on April 13, 2026, two months after the Supreme Court decision, with Auguste winning by over 700 votes.

The election in Terrebonne attracted considerable attention, both locally and nationally. The initial national results put the Liberal government of Prime Minister Mark Carney three seats shy of a majority government. The uncertainty in Terrebonne, as well as close results in some other ridings, could affect the final issue whether the Liberals would obtain a majority government. The appeal to the Supreme Court attracted further attention, as did its decision annulling the election.

== Timeline of events ==
2025

- April 28: Preliminary election night results had Auguste leading incumbent Bloc MP Sinclair-Desgagné by 35 votes.
- May 1: Routine validation by Elections Canada put Sinclair-Desgagné in the lead by 44 votes; the margin of victory triggered an automatic judicial recount.
- May 10: The judicial recount determined that Auguste won over Sinclair-Desgagné by one vote; consequently Auguste was declared elected.
- May 13: A would-be voter for Sinclair-Desgagné reported that her mail-in ballot was returned to her due to a postal code misprint on the envelope provided by Elections Canada.
- May 23: The Bloc Québécois filed a legal challenge of the election outcome.
- October 27: Following a hearing held the week prior, the Quebec Superior Court found that the printing error did not constitute an "irregularity" in election law, and rejected Sinclair-Desgagné's contested election application.
- November 3: Sinclair-Desgagné announced she would appeal the ruling of the Superior Court to the Supreme Court of Canada.

2026

- February 13: The Supreme Court of Canada granted Sinclair-Desgagné's appeal; as a result the election results for Terrebonne were annulled and Auguste was removed from the seat.
- March 8: A by-election was called for Terrebonne, to be held on April 13.
- April 13: Auguste won the by-election and regained the seat.

== Official 2025 election results ==
On May 10, 2025, Auguste was declared elected as MP for Terrebonne at the conclusion of the judicial recount, with the following results.

2025 Canadian federal election: Terrebonne
Party	Candidate	Votes	%	±%	Expenditures
Liberal	Tatiana Auguste	23,352	38.741	+9.37	$29,829.08
Bloc Québécois	Nathalie Sinclair-Desgagné	23,351	38.739	−2.66	$48,740.91
Conservative	Adrienne Charles	10,961	18.18	+7.73	$7,308.70
New Democratic	Maxime Beaudoin	1,556	2.58	−4.07	$297.98
Green	Benjamin Rankin	630	1.05	−0.38	$0.00
People's	Maria Cantore	428	0.71	−1.97	$1,073.47
Total valid votes		60,278	98.63	+0.88	$135,341.20
Total rejected ballots		840	1.37	–0.88	
Turnout		61,118	67.93	+1.74	
Eligible voters		89,966			
Liberal notional gain from Bloc Québécois		Swing		+6.02	
Source: Elections Canada
Notes: Results were annulled by the Supreme Court of Canada on February 13, 2026. The results were also subject to an automatic judicial recount on May 7, 2025. The number of eligible voters does not include election day registrations.

=== Analysis ===
Ternary plots - poll-by-poll analysis of Terrebonne results
2021

2025
Polls won identified by BQ (cyan), Liberal (red) and Conservative (blue)

=== Evolution of results (2021 to 2025) ===
Party	2021 election		2021 (transposed) (Note: As a consequence of the 2022 Canadian federal electoral redistribution)		2025 (preliminary)		2025 (validated)		2025 (on recount)		2025 vs 2021 Change (pp) (Note: 2025 recount results compared to 2021 transposed results)
Liberal	17,475	29.6	16,528	29.4	23,296	38.7	23,296	38.7	23,352	38.7	+9.3
Bloc Québécois	24,270	41.2	23,298	41.4	23,261	38.7	23,340	38.8	23,351	38.7	-2.7
Conservative	6,183	10.5	5,886	10.5	10,938	18.2	10,956	18.2	10,961	18.2	+7.7
New Democratic	3,913	6.6	3,742	6.6	1,552	2.6	1,552	2.6	1,556	2.5	-3.9
Green	847	2.4	802	1.4	637	1.1	632	1.0	630	1.0	-0.4
People's	1,594	2.7	1,506	2.7	446	0.7	428	0.7	428	0.7	-2.0
Independent (Note: Michel Boudrias was previously elected in 2019 under the Bloc banner, but was not renominated in 2021. He campaigned for reelection as an independent.)	3,864	6.6	4,518	8.0							-8.0
Free	803	1.4	4,518	8.0							-8.0

== Result verification ==
Preliminary results from election night indicated Sinclair-Desgagné was trailing Auguste by 35 votes. Following standard validation, it was shown that Sinclair-Desgagné was leading Auguste by 44 votes. As a result of the extremely close margin of victory in the results, Terrebonne underwent a mandatory judicial recount following the initial validation.

The judicial recount was conducted during the week of May 5. The recount indicated that Auguste won over Sinclair-Desgagné by one vote. Her election moved the Liberal seat count to 169, three short of a majority government.

== National significance ==
Nationally, the federal election was also tight. The Liberal government under Prime Minister Mark Carney was confirmed in power, but as a minority government. The initial national results, including Terrebonne, put the Liberals three seats short of a majority government. Elsewhere in the country, there were other ridings with extremely close results, although none were as close as the count in Terrebonne. Recounts were occurring in those other ridings as well. The outcome of the challenge in Terrebonne potentially could affect whether the Liberal government eventually obtained a majority.

== Contested election ==
=== Vote not counted due to Elections Canada's printing error ===
After the judicial recount, a new issue arose. On May 13, a would-be Bloc voter disclosed that her mail-in ballot was rejected and returned to her due to a postal code misprint on the return envelope provided by Elections Canada. On May 14, Elections Canada acknowledged the error but stated that there was no legal mechanism to overturn a judicial recount. Anyone who disagreed with the recount would have to bring a contested election application in the court system. On May 15, Elections Canada issued an e-mail which stated that five other mail-in ballots with the incorrectly printed returning address had been rejected for having arrived at the Elections Canada office after the deadline; the statement said that they could not determine if the incorrect address had led to the delay.

In September 2025, Elections Canada reported that 115 special ballots had been issued to electors in Terrebonne. Their disposition was as follows:

Outcome	Number
Returned on time and counted	85
Received late	5
Not returned to the local office, of which at least one was returned to the elector by Canada Post after the election	16
Not used, as electors subsequently voted in person	9

=== Contested election ===
On May 15, Bloc Québécois leader Yves-François Blanchet announced that the party would challenge the election result in court and seek a by-election. An application under the contested election provisions of the Canada Elections Act was filed with the Quebec Superior Court in Sinclair-Desgagné's name on May 23, with the hearing scheduled in October.

The judicial hearing of the matter took place at the Saint-Jérôme courthouse starting on October 20. All parties forewent calling live witnesses and instead filed affidavits for their record. The material filed by Elections Canada revealed that the special ballot officer of the electoral district estimated that 40 to 60 envelopes with the incorrect return postal code were issued to voters but did not deem it necessary to inform the returning officer about the error, on the grounds that envelopes were being delivered by Canada Post despite the error, and that the return rate for special ballots was in line with previous elections.

The parties argued as follows:

- Counsel for Sinclair-Desgagné and the Bloc Québécois seized upon the error and argued that it was sufficiently grave to meet the high threshold prescribed by the Supreme Court of Canada in Opitz v Wrzesnewskyj, the most recent contested election case that reached the top court in 2012.
- Counsel for Auguste and the Liberal Party disputed the assertion and instead suggested that the error should be deemed merely as a minor one, noting that a single vote represented just a margin of 0.0016%.
- Counsel for Elections Canada recognized that an error had been committed in the election, but noted that the Supreme Court while giving high priority to the right to vote has held that Canadian elections were not designed to attain perfection.

The proceedings received press coverage not only in Canada, but also internationally, being reported in such outlets as CNN and The Guardian.

=== Quebec Superior Court upheld election ===
On October 27, the Superior Court of Quebec dismissed Sinclair-Desgagné's application to contest the election result. Justice Eric Dufour determined that the postal code error committed by Elections Canada was a human error committed inadvertently and without any dishonest or malicious intent, and therefore in no way affected the integrity of the Canadian electoral system. Accordingly, he determined the error did not constitute an "irregularity" within the meaning of the Canada Elections Act, which would be required to contest the election outcome. He accordingly upheld the election result.

On November 3, Sinclair-Desgagné announced that she would appeal the ruling to the Supreme Court of Canada, and that she was also planning to set up a crowdfunding campaign to raise money for the litigation costs.

The Liberal Party subsequently filed a complaint with the Commissioner of Canada Elections, alleging that litigation costs form part of campaign expenses under the Canada Elections Act, and the anonymity given to crowdfunding donors violates the act's limits on individual and corporate donations. Sinclair-Desgagné responded that she had received two legal opinions on the matter before proceeding with the initiative, and stated that the Liberal claim was "non fondée et malveillante". The federal commissioner then confirmed the legality of Sinclair-Desgagné's actions.

=== Supreme Court of Canada voided election ===
On December 12, Sinclair-Desgagné appealed her decision to the Supreme Court of Canada as of right. By this time the matter had gained renewed significance as the Liberal ranks had grown with the defections of Conservative MPs Chris d'Entremont and Michael Ma; the Liberals were one seat shy of majority status.

The full court of nine justices heard the matter on February 13, 2026, and on the same day Chief Justice Wagner delivered the court's decision from the bench, a majority verdict, granting the appeal voiding the 2025 election results. Consequently Auguste was vacated from the seat with immediate effect, making her the first federal MP unseated by a court decision under the Canada Elections Act. Elections Canada confirmed the announcement, and the Speaker of the House of Commons gave official notice of the vacancy on February 16.

On September 18, 2026, the Supreme Court delievered its reasons for judgment, arising from a 6-3 decision.

== By-election result ==
Terrebonne's by-election was subsequently called for April 13, 2026, in conjunction with others to be held in Scarborough Southwest and University—Rosedale, two days following the close of the Liberal Party's national convention held in Montreal. By the time the three by-elections were held, the Liberal caucus had gained two more Conservative and one NDP defectors, and the government was just one seat shy of majority. While the contest in Terrebonne was expected to be close, Auguste won the election by over 700 votes, or 1.5% margin. With a sweep of all three by-elections, the Liberal caucus ranks stood at 174 in April 2026, two more than needed for a majority.

After reviewing its internal procedures, Elections Canada announced that, to avert the possibility of misdirected ballots in future, special ballots will no longer be manually prepared by a riding office, but will be centrally and automatically prepared at its Ottawa office.

== Historical significance ==
While elections were frequently overturned in the nineteenth century, elections results have rarely been overturned in modern times. The Supreme Court's reasons for its decision to vacate Auguste are awaited to see if they will prescribe further principles and guidelines in these matters.

The Supreme Court's decision to vacate the seat was the first time the election of an MP was successfully overturned under the contested elections provisions in the Canada Elections Act, which were introduced in 2000, when they replaced the previous Dominion Controverted Elections Act.

It was also the first time an MP had been unseated by court order since 1990, when the Supreme Court of Ontario ordered a new election for York North, an election dispute that resulted in two different candidates declared elected and later unseated.

The last instance in which the Supreme Court voided a federal election was in 1942, when it unseated Liberal MP for Stanstead Robert Davidson for "corrupt practices," including bribing voters with cash and whisky. That was the only previous instance where the Supreme Court overruled a lower court's determination of a federal election outcome. However, the law as it stood at the time led the matter down a more drawn-out path, putting the determination of sanction in the hands of the House of Commons' Privileges and Elections Committee. The committee held off reporting its decision and the subsequent byelection call until May 1943, allowing Davidson to occupy for three years following the election in question.

== Student Vote Canada results ==
Student votes are mock elections that run parallel to actual elections, in which students not of voting age participate. They are administered by Student Vote Canada. These are for educational purposes and do not count towards the results. The Liberals won in the poll.

2025 Canadian federal election: Terrebonne
Party	Candidate	Votes	%	±%
Liberal	Tatiana Auguste	1,077	44.21	
Bloc Québécois	Nathalie Sinclair-Desgagné	544	22.33	
Conservative	Adrienne Charles	386	15.85	
New Democratic	Maxime Beaudoin	176	7.22	
Green	Benjamin Rankin	169	6.94	
People's	Maria Cantore	84	3.45	
Total valid votes		2,436		
Liberal notional hold		Swing		
Source: Student Vote Canada

== See also ==
- 2025 Terrebonne provincial by-election
- 2026 Terrebonne federal by-election
- 2025 Canadian federal election in Quebec
- Burnaby Central in the 2025 Canadian federal election
- Carleton in the 2025 Canadian federal election
- List of close election results
