= Nathalie Sinclair-Desgagné =

Canadian politician (born 1988)

Member of Parliament for Terrebonne
- In office September 20, 2021 – April 28, 2025
- Preceded by: Michel Boudrias
- Succeeded by: Tatiana Auguste

Personal details
- Born: 1988 (age 37–38)
- Party: Bloc Québécois
- Occupation: Politician

Nathalie Sinclair-Desgagné (born 1988) is a Canadian politician who served as the member of Parliament for the riding of Terrebonne in the House of Commons from 2021 to 2025. She is a member of the Bloc Québécois.

== Education and early career ==
Sinclair-Desgagné was born in 1988, the daughter of Bernard Sinclair-Desgagné, an economics professor at HEC Montréal, and Gilda Villaran-Calderon, an immigration lawyer.

Sinclair-Desgagné holds a degree in economics from McGill University and a master's degree from the University of Oxford. Prior to being elected, she served as a senior economic advisor to the general management of the City of Montreal. She has also worked for Deloitte and PwC.

== Political career ==
Sinclair-Desgagné was elected to represent the riding of Terrebonne in the House of Commons in the 2021 federal election as a member of the Bloc Québécois. She served as the critic of public finances, pandemic programs and Canada Economic Development for Quebec Regions in the Bloc Québécois Shadow Cabinet.

In the 2025 federal election, the initial count completed the day after the election showed Sinclair-Desgagné losing her seat to Liberal candidate Tatiana Auguste, but Elections Canada's validation process revised the results, instead giving Sinclair-Desgagné a 44-vote victory. Because of the narrow margin, a judicial recount was automatically triggered. The recount, completed on May 10, flipped the result again, confirming Auguste as the victor by a margin of a single vote.

Sinclair-Desgagné said she would contest the result after a Bloc voter disclosed that her mail-in ballot had been returned to her due to a postal code misprint on the envelope provided by Elections Canada. After Elections Canada said that it did not have legal standing to change the result, the Bloc announced on May 15 that it would seek a court order for a new by-election. The same day, Elections Canada stated that five other mail ballots with the incorrect returning address printed had been rejected because they had arrived at the Elections Canada office in the riding after the deadline; the statement said that it could not determine if the incorrect address was responsible.

The election result was upheld on October 27 by the Superior Court of Quebec. On November 3, Sinclair-Desgagné announced that she would be appealing the ruling to the Supreme Court of Canada. On February 13, 2026, the Supreme Court annulled the result of the election in the riding, leaving the seat vacant. Auguste won the ensuing by-election on April 13 by 668 votes.

At the time of the 2025 Canadian federal election, she lived in Montreal.

=== Electoral record ===
Canadian federal by-election, April 13, 2026: Terrebonne 2025 result annulled by Supreme Court
Party	Candidate	Votes	%	±%
Liberal	Tatiana Auguste	22,445	48.32	+9.59
Bloc Québécois	Nathalie Sinclair-Desgagné	21,777	46.89	+8.15
Conservative	Adrienne Charles	1,548	3.33	-14.85
New Democratic	Maxime Beaudoin	248	0.53	-2.05
Green	Benjamin Rankin	194	0.42	-0.63
People's	Maria Cantore	113	0.24	-0.47
Rhinoceros	Mark Moutter	61	0.13	–
Independent	Julie St-Amand	7	0.02	–
Independent	Nicolas Champagne	5	0.01	–
Independent	Geneviève Dorval	4	0.01	–
Independent	Myriam Beaulieu	3	0.01	–
No Affiliation	Sébastien CoRhino	3	0.01	–
Independent	Samuel Pignedoli	3	0.00	–
Independent	Myles René Laurent St. Pierre	3	0.01	–
Independent	Alex Banks	2	0.00	–
Independent	Sophia Bearden	2	0.00	–
Independent	Samuel Ducharme	2	0.00	–
Independent	Elizabeth Dupuis	2	0.00	–
Independent	Laurie Goble	2	0.00	–
Independent	Seyed Hosseini Lavasani	2	0.00	–
Independent	Ryan Huard	2	0.00	–
Independent	Krzysztof Krzywinski	2	0.00	–
Independent	Bryan Wang	2	0.00	–
Independent	Danica Boe	1	0.00	–
Independent	Jenny Cartwright	1	0.00	–
Independent	Jaël Champagne Gareau	1	0.00	–
Independent	Jayson Cowan	1	0.00	–
Independent	Michael Dyck	1	0.00	–
Independent	Anthony Hamel	1	0.00	–
Independent	Chris Kowalchuk	1	0.00	–
Independent	John Francis O'Flynn	1	0.00	–
Independent	Spencer Rocchi	1	0.00	–
Independent	Pascal St-Amand	1	0.00	–
Independent	Vivian Unger	1	0.00	–
Independent	Jeani Boudreault	0	0.00	–
Independent	Gerrit Dogger	0	0.00	–
Independent	Ysack Dupont	0	0.00	–
Independent	Alexandra Engering	0	0.00	–
Independent	Emily Goose	0	0.00	–
Independent	Kazimir Haykowsky	0	0.00	–
Independent	Jack Jean-Louis	0	0.00	–
Independent	Joseph Alain Matthew Laveault	0	0.00	–
Independent	Jocelyn LeBlanc-Courchaine	0	0.00	–
Independent	Lanna Palsson	0	0.00	–
Independent	Lajos Polya	0	0.00	–
Independent	Kayll Schaefer	0	0.00	–
Independent	Justin Steinburg	0	0.00	–
Independent	Alon Weinberg	0	0.00	–
Total valid votes/expense limit		46,443		
Total rejected ballots		371		
Turnout		46,814	51.25	-16.68
Eligible voters		91,344		
Liberal hold		Swing		+0.72
Source: Elections Canada

2025 Canadian federal election: Terrebonne
Party	Candidate	Votes	%	±%	Expenditures
Liberal	Tatiana Auguste	23,352	38.741	+9.37	$29,829.08
Bloc Québécois	Nathalie Sinclair-Desgagné	23,351	38.739	−2.66	$48,740.91
Conservative	Adrienne Charles	10,961	18.18	+7.73	$7,308.70
New Democratic	Maxime Beaudoin	1,556	2.58	−4.07	$297.98
Green	Benjamin Rankin	630	1.05	−0.38	$0.00
People's	Maria Cantore	428	0.71	−1.97	$1,073.47
Total valid votes		60,278	98.63	+0.88	$135,341.20
Total rejected ballots		840	1.37	–0.88	
Turnout		61,118	67.93	+1.74	
Eligible voters		89,966			
Liberal notional gain from Bloc Québécois		Swing		+6.02	
Source: Elections Canada
Notes: Results were annulled by the Supreme Court of Canada on February 13, 2026. The results were also subject to an automatic judicial recount on May 7, 2025. The number of eligible voters does not include election day registrations.

2021 Canadian federal election: Terrebonne
Party	Candidate	Votes	%	±%	Expenditures
Bloc Québécois	Nathalie Sinclair-Desgagné	24,270	41.17	-9.42	$28,625.35
Liberal	Eric Forget	17,475	29.64	+0.39	$6,336.80
Conservative	Frédérick Desjardins	6,183	10.49	+2.92	$8,029.08
New Democratic	Luke Mayba	3,913	6.64	-0.91	$7,745.37
Independent	Michel Boudrias	3,864	6.55	N/A	$16,574.97
People's	Louis Stinziani	1,594	2.70	+2.05	$0.00
Green	Dave Hamelin-Schuilenburg	847	1.44	-2.28	$103.94
Free	Nathan Fortin-Dubé	803	1.36	N/A	$25.71
Total valid votes/expense limit		58,949	97.75	–	$119,339.41
Total rejected ballots		1,355	2.25	+0.20	
Turnout		60,304	66.25	-4.06	
Eligible voters		91,028			
Bloc Québécois hold		Swing		-4.90	
Source: Elections Canada
Notes: The incumbent MP, Michel Boudrias, was not renominated as the candidate for the Bloc Quebecois, and subsequently ran as an Independent
