= 1990 York North federal by-election =

- December 10, 1990

Riding of York North
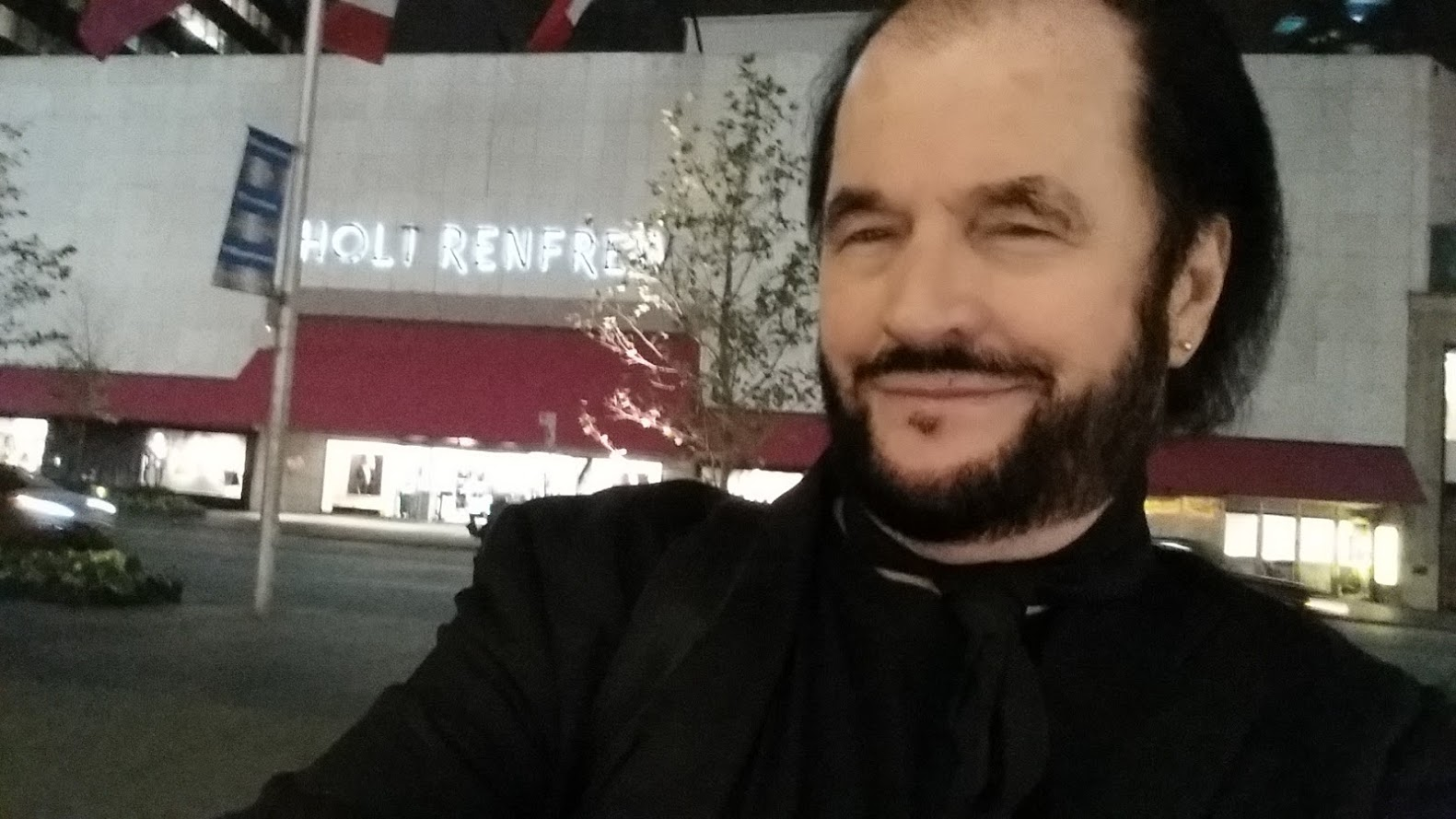
	First party	Second party	Third party
	LIB	NDP
Candidate	Maurizio Bevilacqua	Peter Devita	Micheal O'Brien
Party	Liberal	New Democratic	Progressive Conservative
Popular vote	21,332	14,321	4,618
Percentage	49.90%	33.50%	10.80%
MP before election
Maurizio Bevilacqua
Liberal
Elected MP
Maurizio Bevilacqua
Liberal

A by-election was held in the federal electoral district of York North in Ontario on December 10, 1990, to fill a vacancy caused by a ruling by the Supreme Court of Ontario that annulled the 1988 election, unseating Liberal member of Parliament (MP) Maurizio Bevilacqua. Bevilacqua contested the by-election and gained back the seat with a comfortable margin more than two years after the initial election contest, while his principal rival in the original contest, Progressive Conservative Micheal O'Brien, came in a distant third.

The by-election is notable for the two-year legal dispute that preceded it, involving multiple recounts and a court decision that declared the original election invalid. It was historically unique for a number of reasons:

- It was the only instance where an MP who had taken their seat in the House of Commons was ousted by a recount. (Note: While still very rare, MPs have been ousted for other reasons through contested elections. Recounts are usually completed soon after the election, long before winners would normally take their seats. In modern days, when an election is subject to a judicial recount, the returning officer is not to return the writ before the recount is completed.) Following the conclusion of the initial recount, O'Brien was declared elected, sworn into office, and participated in debates in the first sessions of the 34th Parliament.
- It was the only instance where two recounts were conducted for the same election and the result was changed after both recounts
- It was the only instance where two federal MPs were sworn in and served in the House of Commons following the same election (Note: There were provincial precedents in the late 1800s, however.), and the only time that two members elected from the same contest were unseated.
- It was the final instance where an MP was removed from office through the Dominion Controverted Elections Act, before that legislation was repealed in 2000. It was replaced by Part 20 of the Canada Elections Act.

== Events leading to by-election ==
=== Context in electoral district ===
York North was one of the original electoral districts created at Canadian Confederation and one of the very few that had been continually represented till the end of the twentieth century. While its geography varied significantly over the many decades, it had consistently covered much of modern-day Vaughan since the late 1920s and Richmond Hill and Markham since the 1950s. The redistribution prior to 1988 led to significant changes to its geography. It shed the town of Markham in the end of the riding, while re-gaining Aurora and the southern portion of King Township, while retaining Richmond Hill and Vaughan.

It also had some recent tumultuous political history. Its Progressive Conservative MPs from 1979 to 1984 was known for his extreme anti-communist views and animosity toward former PC leader Joe Clark, and became so unpopular that he was one of only two Progressive Conservative MPs to lose their seat in the 1984 landslide PC victory, allowed a rare instance of an independent being elected. Incumbent MP Tony Roman did not stand for re-election but endorsed Progressive Conservative candidate Micheal O'Brien. With significant territory change and no incumbent, it was seen as an open seat and the Liberal nomination was a hotly contested prize. Maurizio Bevilacqua, then a 28-year-old backroom organizer, won the nomination in late June against future caucus colleague Maria Minna and future Thornhill MPP Mario Racco, following an acrimonious contest that was widely covered in the press. Bevilacqua attracted extra scrutiny for being supported by local auto tycoon Frank Stronach (who himself was the Liberal candidate in the riding to the north) with both money and membership drawn from Magna employees.

=== Shifting votes tallies, two judicial recounts ===
In the 1988 election, held November 21, 1988, preliminary results had O'Brien leading Bevilacqua 39,104 to 39,046. The results however shifted numerous times in the ensuring days, with press reportred Bevilacqua having taken the lead. Following the official validation process on November 24, Bevilacqua was declared the winner with a margin of 66 votes.

In response, O'Brien requested and was granted a judicial recount. Prior to the actual recount, District Court Judge Eugene Fedak ruled to exclude more than 3,500 ballots from 16 polls on the grounds that the envelopes containing those ballots were only signed by one poll clerk rather than the required two, or were not sealed properly. The recount was concluded on December 5. O'Brien was declared the winner by a margin of 99 votes and was sworn in as the member of Parliament (MP) for York North.

Bevilacqua then appealed the recount judge's decision to exclude the 3,500 ballots. His counsel, the future Ontario indigenous affairs minister David Zimmer, and Elections Canada counsel both argued that the ballots ought not to be excluded by procedural oversights of Elections Canada officials, and that the integrity of those ballots were not subject to scrutiny at a recount but may only be challenged through a proceeding under the Dominion Controverted Elections Act. On December 15, Ontario Supreme Court justice David H. Doherty ruled that the recount judge erred in excluding ballots and ordered a second recount with those ballots included. The second recount was completed on January 11, 1989 with final tally showing Bevilacqua defeating O'Brien 37,513 votes to 37,436 votes, a 77-vote margin. O'Brien's seat was vacated after he had served 55 days as MP, and Bevilacqua was sworn in later that month. O'Brien ousting marked the only time an MP who had taken their seat in the House of Commons being ousted by a recount. It was also the first federal election where two MPs were sworn in and served in the House of Commons following the same election.

=== Controverted election ===
O’Brien then filed a petition under the Dominion Controverted Elections Act, arguing that numerous violations of the Canada Elections Act had compromised the vote. The Ontario Supreme Court heard evidence of mistakes affecting 121 ballots, enough to potentially alter the 77-vote margin. Most of the cases involved voters who had been mistakenly left off official voters' lists, but who were still allowed to vote. In several cases, electors were vouched for by individuals who not on the voters' list themselves, contrary to the requirements of the Canada Elections Act. On May 29, 1990, the Ontario Supreme Court declared the election results void. Prior to the ruling, no federal election has been annulled by court for over 20 years. Under the Controverted Elections Act, Bevilacqua had eight days to appeal the ruling to the Supreme Court of Canada. However, he announced on June 5 that he would not appeal the ruling, noting the litigation had already cost him between $50,000 and $70,000. The York North riding was declared vacant by John Fraser, Speaker of the House of Commons, on June 7.

The 1990 decision was the last instance of an election being overturned under the Dominion Controverted Elections Act. It would be well over 30 years before another federal election would be overturned by court, when in 2026 the Supreme Court of Canada annulled the 2025 election in Terrebonne, Quebec, under the replacement provisions for contested elections in the Canada Elections Act.

== By-election ==
A by-election was held on December 10, 1990, the same day as another by-election in Beauséjour in New Brunswick, through which the newly elected Liberal leader and future prime minister Jean Chretien re-entered Parliament. Compared to the protracted legal battle that preceded it, the by-election itself produced a clear result. Political context has shifted significantly with various developments, including the demise of the Meech Lake Accord, the negotiation of NAFTA, ethics controversies in the PC government and the election of a new Liberal Party leader. Support for Brian Mulroney and the Progressive Conservative Party had declined substantially by this point, placing O'Brien at a disadvantage.

More than two years following the initial election, Bevilacqua reclaimed the seat by a comfortable margin of more than 7,000 votes over the second-place NDP candidate. O'Brien, who again represented the Progressive Conservatives, was pushed into third place with fewer than one-eighth of the votes he received two years prior.

=== Results ===
Canadian federal by-election, December 10, 1990: York North Bevilacqua's 1988 election declared void and invalid on July 6, 1990
Party	Candidate	Votes	%	±%
Liberal	Maurizio Bevilacqua	21,332	49.90%	
New Democratic	Peter Devita	14,321	33.50%	
Progressive Conservative	Micheal O'Brien	4,618	10.80%	
Christian Heritage	William Ubbens	1,399	3.27%	
Libertarian	Roma Kelembet	424	0.99%	
Independent	David M. Shelley	239	0.56%	
Independent	Adelchi Di Palma	163	0.38%	
Independent	Paul Wizman	156	0.36%	
Independent	John Turmel	97	0.23%	
Total valid votes		42,749	100.0	

== Timeline of results ==
Date	Event	Maurizio Bevilacqua	Micheal O'Brien	Leading
November 21, 1988	Election night results	39,046	39,104	O'Brien by 58
November 23, 1988	Preliminary results with all polls reported	37,442	37,436	Bevilacqua by 6
November 25, 1988	Official results post validation	37,502	37,436	Bevilacqua by 58
November 30, 1988	Recount judge's preliminary decision to exclude 3,500+ ballots			
December 5, 1988	First recount	35,917	36,016	O'Brien by 99, declared elected
December 15, 1998	Ontario Supreme Court ruled recount judge erred in excluding ballots, order second recount			
January 11, 1989	Second recount	37,513	37,436	Bevilacqua by 77, declared elected
May 29, 1990	Ontario Supreme Court annulled the 1988 election result			
June 7, 1990	Speaker John Fraser declared the seat for York North vacant			
December 10, 1990	By-election	21,332	4,618	Bevilacqua over new NDP candidate by 7,011

== See also ==
- 1997 Winchester by-election, a by-election in England held under identical circumstances
