= David H. Doherty =

Canadian judge

David H. Doherty is a retired justice of the Ontario Court of Appeal and considered by many to be the author of leading judgments responsible for shaping criminal law in Canada. Doherty is a graduate of Western Law School.

He was initially appointed September 1, 1990, and was previously a judge of the Supreme Court of Ontario from September 2, 1988. He retired from the Court of Appeal in 2024.

Justice Doherty was presented with the 2019 G. Arthur Martin award by the Toronto Criminal Lawyers Association.
