= Micheal O'Brien (Canadian politician) =

Canadian journalist

Micheal John O'Brien
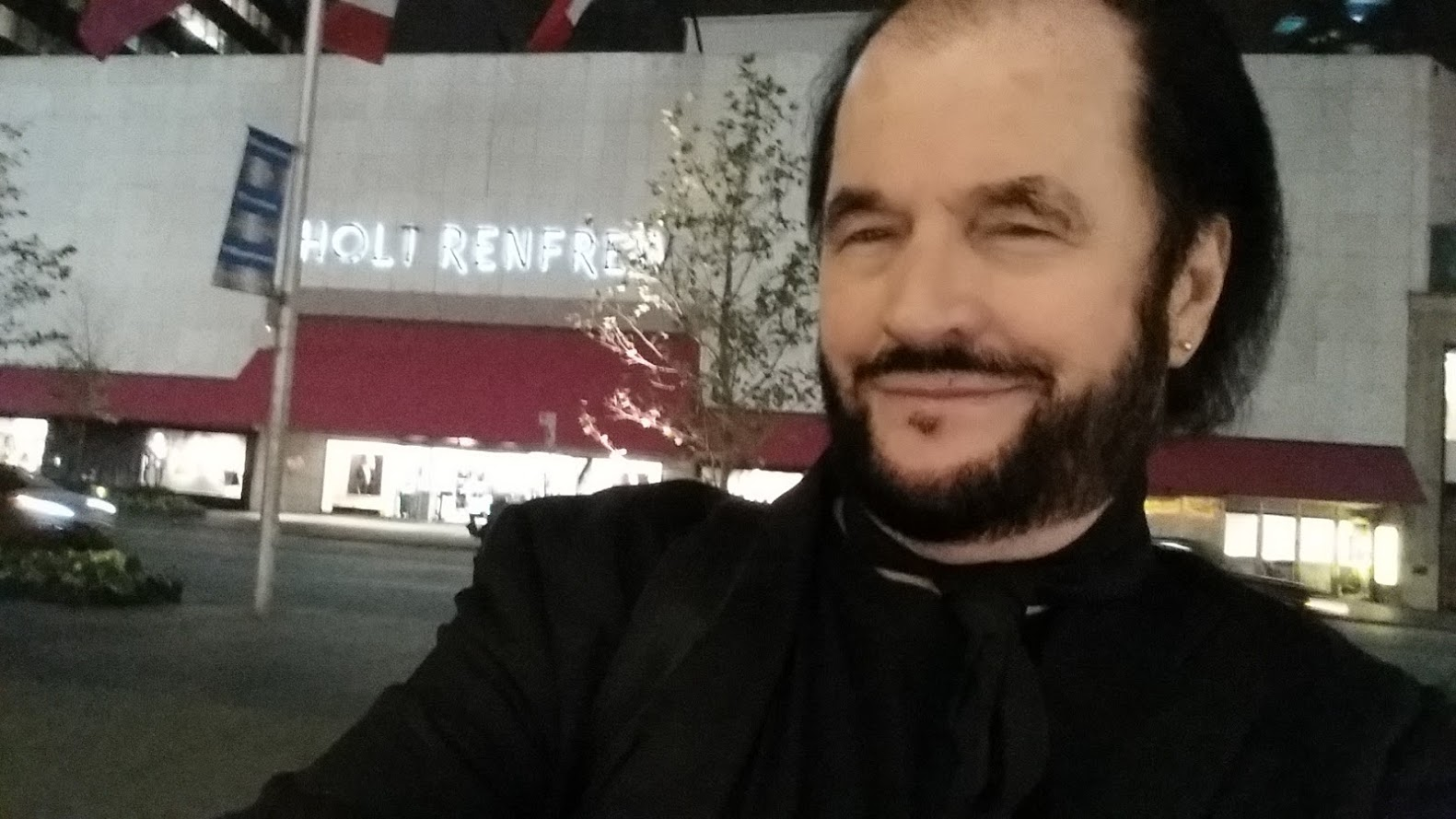
- Micheal John O'Brien October 2, 2014, in Toronto
- Born: Micheal John O'Brien; August 21, 1950 (age 76); Toronto, Canada
- Spouse(s): Elaine Olive McCarty (m. 1972; div. 1993) Jennifer Alaga-O'Brien (m. 2016)
- Children: 4
- Website: mobrien.com

Micheal John O'Brien (born August 21, 1950) is a Canadian commercial pilot, humanitarian leader, journalist, musician, and politician, who was declared a winner on election night, November 21, 1988, and despite recounts that went back and forth, he was sworn into office as elected and made his Maiden Speech in the House of Commons of Canada on December 23, 1988.

== Personal life ==
O'Brien, a Canadian and also citizen of Ireland (European Union) was born on August 21, 1950, at St. Joseph's Hospital in Toronto, Canada to Barbara O'Brien, an artist, and Edward O'Brien, an engineer and executive of Spar Aerospace's predecessor company. O'Brien's studies include human behaviour and public health including postgraduate studies in the United States.

== Career ==
After graduating with a University of Toronto BSc and a commercial pilot's license from Maple Flying School (established by Marion Alice Orr, one of Canada's first women pilots) in Vaughan (now a city) in York Region, Ontario, O'Brien in his early 20s became the chief pilot for Specialty Air Services Limited from 1972 to 1979, flying out of what was then called Maple Airport and the Billy Bishop Toronto City Airport which is still in operation today.

From 1979 through 1989 O'Brien was a publisher, writer and editor with Maclean Hunter Limited's Business Publishing Division and in 1989 acquired some of the publishing properties including "The Wednesday Report", "The Canadian Yong Astronaut" (terminated in 1992), and "Canadian Aerospace and Defence Technology") he published for Maclean Hunter and merged them into MPRM Group Limited and continued publishing from 1989 to 2004. O'Brien worked for a time as the Director of Operations for the Toronto Cosmetic Surgery Center which he left in 2014 to both work in several Asian countries with The RINJ Foundation while completing postgraduate studies. Currently O'Brien is the editor-in-chief of the global edition of Feminine-Perspective Magazine.

== Humanitarian work ==
O'Brien was the Vice President of the Southern Alberta office of the Canadian Cancer Society in Medicine Hat, Alberta (Now defunct.) in 1970 under Dr. Paul Racine. Returning to Ontario in 1972 O'Brien undertook an extensive life of Community involvement in Richmond Hill, Ontario as a hockey coach, member of the Civic Improvement Committee of town council as well as the Canada Day Committee. At some point he became involved in helping community members locate missing children and troubled teens. This led to his and his associates forming a global civil society group, the RINJ Foundation, for which he is the chief executive officer.

As the RINJ Foundation co-founder, O'Brien publicly accused Facebook of ignoring the RINJ Rape Is No Joke Campaign for the rights of women and several online petitions to remove pro-rape Facebook pages in May 2010. O'Brien also claimed that the pages were maintained and supported by Australian college students and British teenage boys with links to the anonymous English-language imageboard website 4chan. The RINJ campaign urged advertisers to cancel their advertising on the Facebook platform to avoid it being displayed on pages next to rape jokes and other pro-rape content.

From 2009 through 2013, O'Brien led the RINJ campaign argument to Facebook executives that removing "pro-rape" pages from Facebook and other social media was not a violation of free speech in the context of Article 19 of the Universal Declaration of Human Rights and the concepts recognized in international human rights law in the International Covenant on Civil and Political Rights.

In 2017 O’Brien slammed the HipHop / Rap Music sector for its sexism and misogyny having widely accused rappers Eminem and Big Sean of “encouraging rape & physical violence against American author Ann Coulter”, and claimed it was “symbolic of the direction America appears to be headed”. O'Brien issued a statement strongly urging the boycott of rape rappers and their labels. O'Brien, on behalf of RINJ, claimed that "In a poorly mastered rap recording by rape rappers Marshall Bruce Mathers (Eminem) and Sean Michael Anderson (Big Sean), America’s most popular and most vulgar heroes demonstrate why and how America became a global misogyny pariah."

== Political career ==
On September 1, 1988, in a five-hour contest in a packed Richmond Hill Lion's Hall on Centre Street, Progressive Conservatives chose O'Brien as their candidate in York North, over Martin Peterson and Peter Philips. O'Brien won the nomination in a second ballot decision late in the night. "This is a winnable riding, although I think it will be a very tough riding," he was quoted as saying to the Toronto Star's Andrew Duffy.

In the 1988 Canadian federal election, O'Brien "was declared the winner by 99 votes, was sworn in, and participated in the Canada-U.S. free-trade agreement debate in the short-lived First Session of the Thirty-Fourth Parliament". He made his maiden speech in the House of Commons on December 23, 1988.

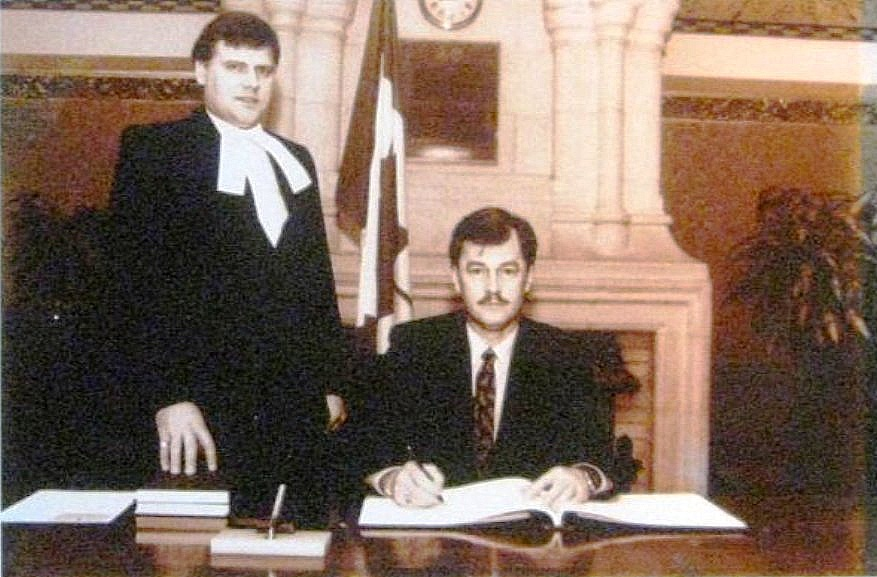
O'Brien (seated) being sworn in as an MP by Robert Marleau, Clerk of the House of Commons (1988)

O'Brien, had been endorsed by MP Tony Roman---for whom O'Brien had been one of the community leaders who convinced Roman to run as a "Coalition" independent in 1984—became the candidate for the Canadian federal Progressive Conservative Party. O’Brien, had initially been declared the winner in the riding of York North in the 1988 federal election. Three days later, as a result of a recount supervised by a contingent of the Liberal opponent, candidate Maurizio Bevilacqua, the latter was declared the winner. O'Brien sought a judicial recount, was declared the winner by 99 votes, was sworn in, and participated in the Canada-U.S. free-trade agreement debate in the short-lived First Session of the Thirty-Fourth Parliament. Maurizio Bevilacqua appealed the recount and was subsequently declared the sitting Member by 77 votes (see Journals, April 3, 1989, pp. 2–3). (According to House of Commons of Canada records, both men represented the Federal Riding of York North, O'Brien for the 1st Session and Maurizio Bevilacqua for the subsequent sessions.) O'Brien consulted extensively with the Honourable Erik Nielsen who had encountered a similar situation in 1957. With that precedent O'Brien and his riding association mounted a successful Controverted Election Act Petition to the Ontario Supreme Court. Two Ontario supreme court judges found that the number of irregularly cast ballots in the 1988 election had exceeded Bevilacqua's 77-vote plurality over O'Brien. The election was subsequently voided and the cases of O'Brien and Erik Nielsen have been cited as significant Supreme Court precedents in election law. (O'Brien v. Hamel (1990), 73 O.R. (2d) 87 (H.C.J.))

The Brian Mulroney Government eventually declared a by-election for York North, to be held the same day as a by-election for the Federal Riding of Beauséjour in New Brunswick. On December 10, 1990, the by-election in the York North saw the election of Maurizio Bevilacqua (Lib), while Jean Chrétien (Lib) won the by-election in Beauséjour, as Brian Mulroney introduced the General Sales Tax. The by-election became the "GST by-election" and the key winner became Jean Chrétien who had become the leader of the Liberal Party and Her Majesty's Official Leader of the Opposition.

== Electoral record ==
1988 Canadian federal election: York North
Party	Candidate	Votes
Liberal	Maurizio Bevilacqua	37,513
Progressive Conservative	Micheal O'Brien	37,436
New Democratic	Evelyn Buck	11,583
Libertarian	Chris Edwards	1,293

Canadian federal by-election, December 10, 1990: York North Bevilacqua's 1988 election declared void and invalid on July 6, 1990
Party	Candidate	Votes	%	±%
Liberal	Maurizio Bevilacqua	21,332	49.90%	
New Democratic	Peter Devita	14,321	33.50%	
Progressive Conservative	Micheal O'Brien	4,618	10.80%	
Christian Heritage	William Ubbens	1,399	3.27%	
Libertarian	Roma Kelembet	424	0.99%	
Independent	David M. Shelley	239	0.56%	
Independent	Adelchi Di Palma	163	0.38%	
Independent	Paul Wizman	156	0.36%	
Independent	John Turmel	97	0.23%	
Total valid votes		42,749	100.0	
