= 2006 Vermont elections =

- November 7, 2006

The Vermont Election in 2006 consisted of elections for federal, state, and local elections. All state offices were for two years; all terms expired in 2006. Elections included the gubernatorial, all state offices, including all state senators and representatives, the federal Congress and the U.S. Senate.

A primary election in August determined which candidates parties would choose to run in the general election in November. Local elections occurred during the town meeting in March.

== Auditor of Accounts ==
2006 Vermont auditor of accounts election
- November 7, 2006

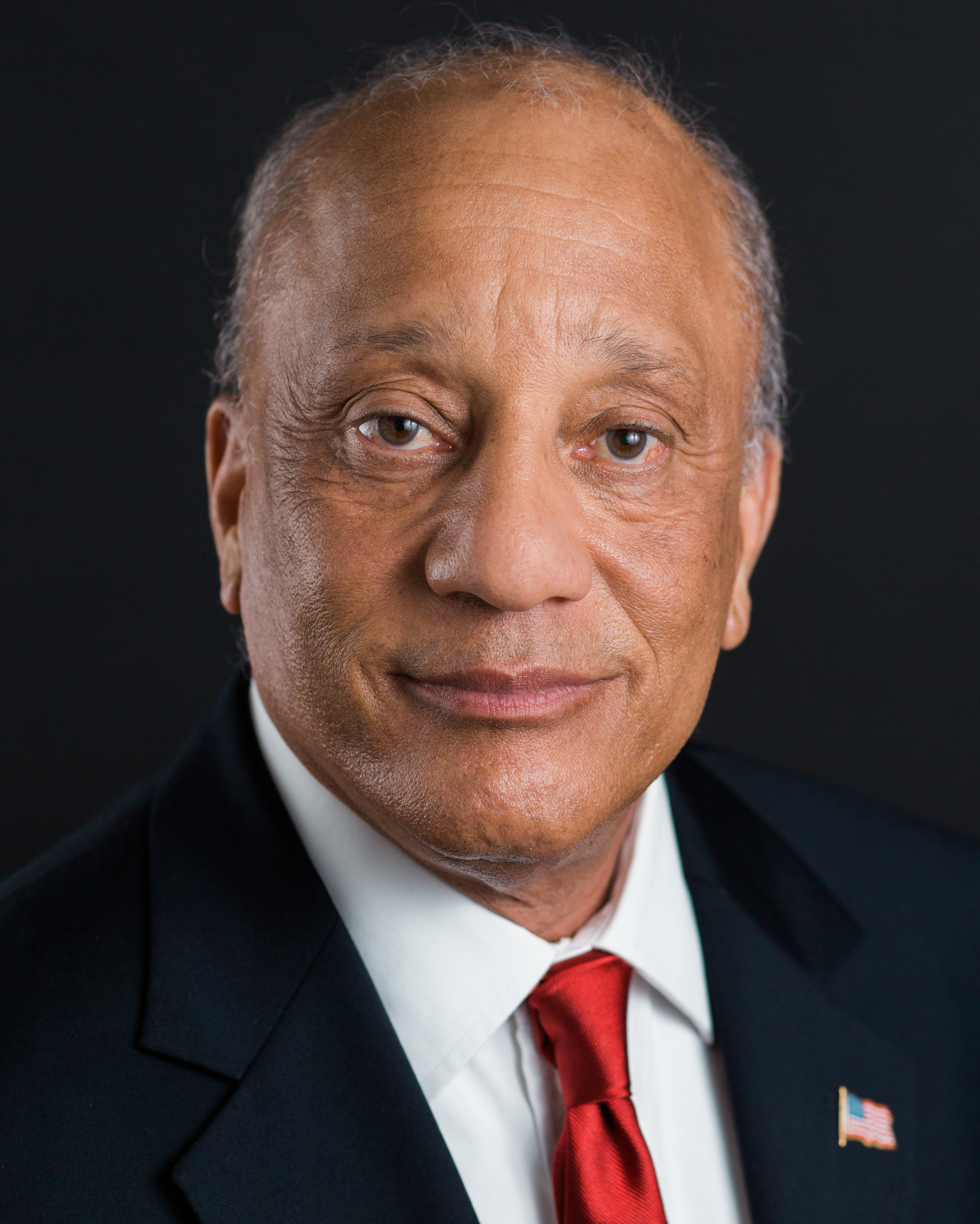

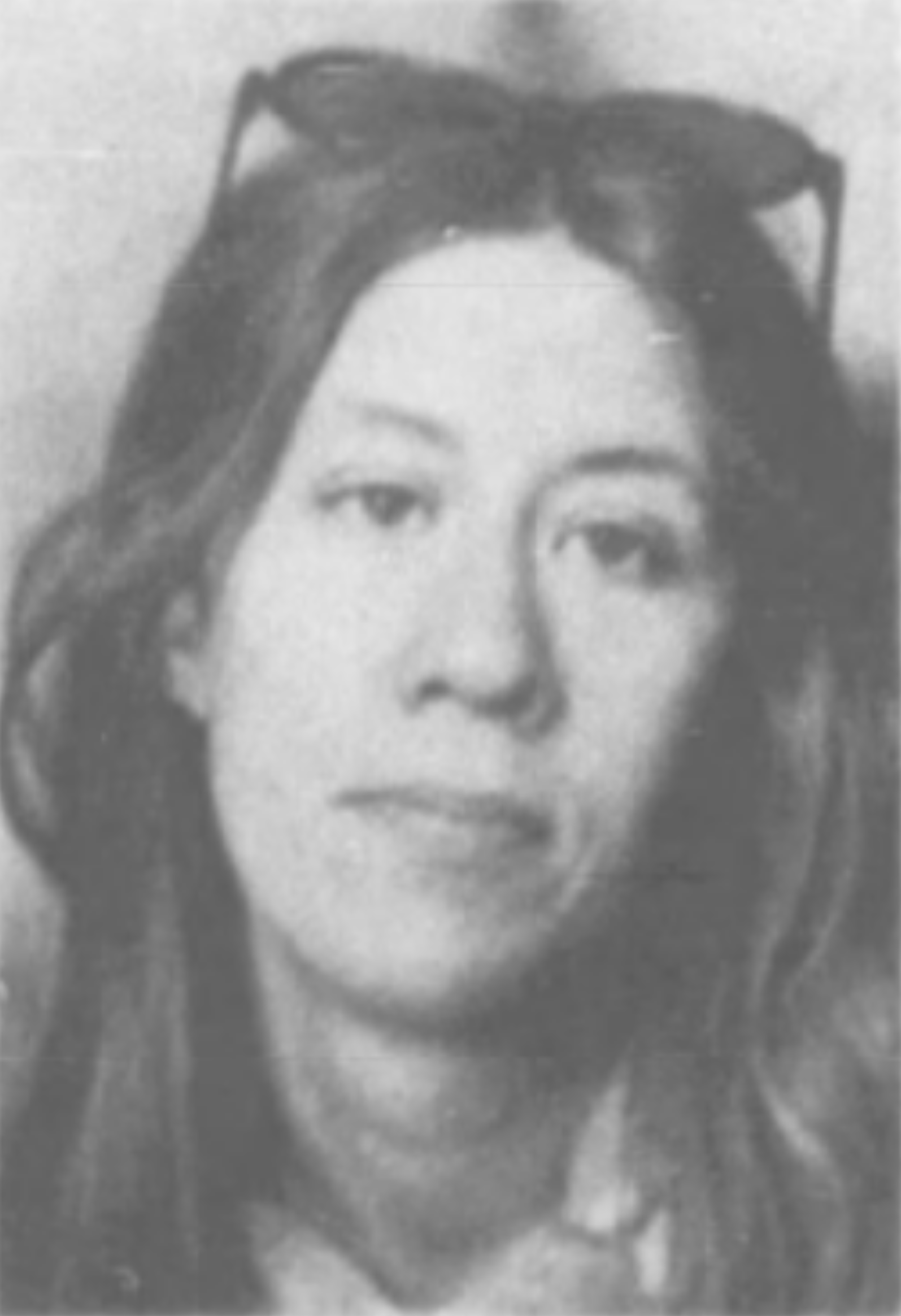
Nominee	Thomas M. Salmon	Randy Brock	Martha Abbott
Party	Democratic	Republican	Progressive
Popular vote	111,741	111,637	23,483
Percentage	44.56%	44.52%	9.36%
Nominee	Jerry Levy
Party	Liberty Union
Popular vote	3,913
Percentage	1.56%
- Salmon: 30–40% 40–50% 50–60% 60–70% 70–80% 80–90% Brock: 30–40% 40–50% 50–60% 60–70% 70–80% No Data/Vote
Auditor before election
Randy Brock
Republican
Elected Auditor
Thomas M. Salmon
Democratic

In 2006, a close general election for Auditor of Accounts prompted a recount which overturned the original count. This was one of two state results overturned anywhere in the nation from 1980 through 2006. It was the seventh recount in Vermont's history and the only one that overturned an original count.

=== Candidates ===
- Martha Abbott, Progressive
- Randolph D. "Randy" Brock, Republican, Incumbent
- Jerry Levy, Liberty Union
- Thomas M. "Tom" Salmon, Democrat

=== Election and recount ===
Unofficial election night results had Democrat Thomas M. "Tom" Salmon losing to Republican incumbent Randolph D. "Randy" Brock by over 800 votes. But when the certified results were announced a few days later, Brock was leading by only 137 votes (with over 250,000 votes cast). Given the closeness of the election, Salmon, in accordance with Title 17, section 2602(b) of the state statutes, then petitioned the Washington County Superior Court for a recount.

As recounted results began coming in from the state's 14 Counties, Brock's lead soon disappeared, and Salmon took the lead.

On December 21, 2006, Superior Court Judge Mary Miles Teachout declared Salmon the winner by a margin of 102 votes over Brock.

This was the first statewide recount in Vermont in 26 years. According to the state archivist, it is also the first time in the state's history that a certified election was overturned on the basis of a recount. Also, according to Brock, this may have been the closest statewide election in the state's history.

Salmon took office on January 4, 2007.

=== Results ===
The unofficial recount results as of December 19, 2006, as reported by the Vermont Secretary of State's office (these results do not include small changes due to the counting of 62 provisional and vote by phone ballots, and due to the court's resolution of a small number of disputed ballots, that were included in the final results):

Candidate	Party	Original Count	Recount	Change in Votes
Martha Abbott	Progressive	23,545	23,483	-62
Randy Brock	Republican	111,486	111,637	+151
Jerry Levy	Liberty Union	4,229	3,913	-316
Thomas M. Salmon (Winner)	Democratic	111,349	111,741	+392
