= Michel Boudrias =

Canadian politician (born 1977)

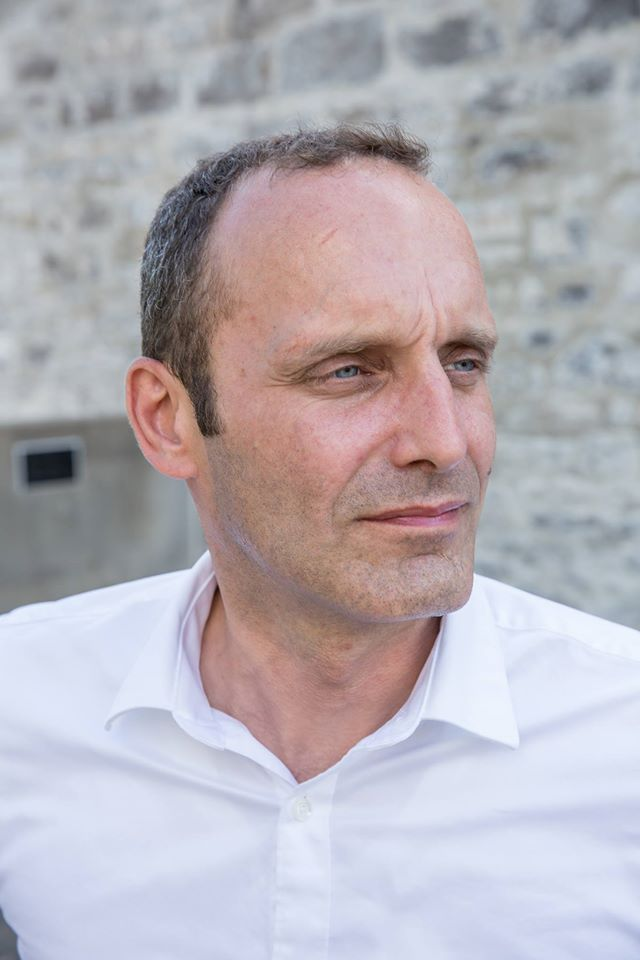
- Michel Boudrias

Member of Parliament for Terrebonne
- In office October 19, 2015 – September 20, 2021
- Preceded by: Charmaine Borg (Terrebonne—Blainville)
- Succeeded by: Nathalie Sinclair-Desgagné

Personal details
- Born: 1977 (age 48–49) Roberval, Quebec, Canada
- Party: Independent
- Other political affiliations: Bloc Québécois (2015–2018, 2018–2021); Québec debout (2018)

Military service
- Branch/service: Canadian Army
- Unit: Royal 22e Régiment

Michel Boudrias (born 1977) is a Canadian politician who served as the member of Parliament (MP) for the riding of Terrebonne in the House of Commons of Canada from 2015 to 2021. He was first elected in the 2015 election as a member of the Bloc Québécois. On February 28, 2018, however, Boudrias, along with six other Bloc MPs, resigned from the Bloc's caucus to sit as an independent MP citing conflicts with the leadership style of Martine Ouellet. Following Ouellet's resignation, he rejoined the party on June 6, 2018. Boudrias was not re-nominated by the Bloc for the 2021 election and ran as an independent. He was defeated by Bloc candidate Nathalie Sinclair-Desgagné.

Boudrias served in Afghanistan in 2010–11 as part of the Royal 22nd Regiment. He is also a recipient of the Queen's Diamond Jubilee Medal.

== Electoral record ==
2021 Canadian federal election: Terrebonne
Party	Candidate	Votes	%	±%	Expenditures
Bloc Québécois	Nathalie Sinclair-Desgagné	24,270	41.17	-9.42	$28,625.35
Liberal	Eric Forget	17,475	29.64	+0.39	$6,336.80
Conservative	Frédérick Desjardins	6,183	10.49	+2.92	$8,029.08
New Democratic	Luke Mayba	3,913	6.64	-0.91	$7,745.37
Independent	Michel Boudrias	3,864	6.55	N/A	$16,574.97
People's	Louis Stinziani	1,594	2.70	+2.05	$0.00
Green	Dave Hamelin-Schuilenburg	847	1.44	-2.28	$103.94
Free	Nathan Fortin-Dubé	803	1.36	N/A	$25.71
Total valid votes/expense limit		58,949	97.75	–	$119,339.41
Total rejected ballots		1,355	2.25	+0.20	
Turnout		60,304	66.25	-4.06	
Eligible voters		91,028			
Bloc Québécois hold		Swing		-4.90	
Source: Elections Canada
Notes: The incumbent MP, Michel Boudrias, was not renominated as the candidate for the Bloc Quebecois, and subsequently ran as an Independent

2019 Canadian federal election: Terrebonne
Party	Candidate	Votes	%	±%	Expenditures
Bloc Québécois	Michel Boudrias	31,029	50.59	+17.58	$20,129.32
Liberal	Frédéric Beauchemin	17,944	29.26	+1.26	none listed
Conservative	France Gagnon	4,640	7.57	-3.78	$1,869.33
New Democratic	Maxime Beaudoin	4,627	7.54	-18.07	$0.33
Green	Réjean Monette	2,277	3.71	+1.97	none listed
People's	Jeffrey Barnes	399	0.65		none listed
Rhinoceros	Paul Vézina	260	0.42		$0.00
Independent	Jade Hébert	159	0.26		$0.00
Total valid votes/expense limit		61,335	97.95		
Total rejected ballots		1,282	2.05	-0.06	
Turnout		62,617	70.31	-0.15	
Eligible voters		89,062			
Bloc Québécois hold		Swing		+8.16	
Source: Elections Canada

2015 Canadian federal election: Terrebonne
Party	Candidate	Votes	%	±%	Expenditures
Bloc Québécois	Michel Boudrias	19,238	33.01	+2.23	$17,316.45
Liberal	Michèle Audette	16,316	27.99	+21.07	$28,471.60
New Democratic	Charmaine Borg	14,928	25.61	-25.93	$66,226.31
Conservative	Michel Surprenant	6,615	11.35	+3.28	$4,734.68
Green	Susan Moen	1,016	1.74	-0.95	–
Strength in Democracy	Louis Clément Sénat	171	0.29	–	$1,208.41
Total valid votes/expense limit		58,284	97.89		$222,232.39
Total rejected ballots		1,256	2.11	–	
Turnout		59,540	70.46	–	
Eligible voters		84,502			
Bloc Québécois gain from New Democratic		Swing		+14.08	
Source: Elections Canada
