= 2026 Terrebonne federal by-election =

Federal by-election in Quebec, Canada

- April 13, 2026

Riding of Terrebonne
	First party	Second party
	LPC	BQ
Candidate	Tatiana Auguste	Nathalie Sinclair-Desgagné
Party	Liberal	Bloc Québécois
Last election	38.741% (Note: In 2021, the Liberals received 29.37% of the vote.)	38.739% (Note: In 2021, the BQ received 41.40% of the vote.)
Popular vote	22,445	21,714
Percentage	48.41%	46.83%
Swing	▲9.66 pp	▲8.09 pp
- Poll by poll map of Terrebonne in 2025 and 2026
MP before election
Vacant (Note: Tatiana Auguste (Liberal) lost her seat in the House of Commons on February 13, 2026, following the Supreme Court's annulment of the 2025 federal election in Terrebonne.)
Elected MP
Tatiana Auguste
Liberal

A by-election was held on April 13, 2026, to elect a member of Parliament (MP) to represent Terrebonne, Quebec, in the House of Commons for the remainder of the 45th Parliament after the riding's result in the 2025 general election was annulled by the Supreme Court of Canada on February 13, 2026, vacating the seat held at the time by Liberal Party MP Tatiana Auguste. Auguste won the by-election, defeating Sinclair-Desgagné by a margin of 668 votes.

== Background ==
The 2025 federal election result in Terrebonne was contested by the Bloc Québécois candidate, defeated MP Nathalie Sinclair-Desgagné, after a judicial recount awarded the seat to Liberal candidate Tatiana Auguste by one vote. The result was challenged due to a printing error by Elections Canada on a return envelope for mail-in ballots which resulted in an envelope containing a vote for the Bloc Québécois candidate being returned to sender. The Supreme Court of Canada overturned a lower court decision and annulled the result, vacating the seat and requiring a by-election.

== Timing ==
A writ for the by-election could be issued no sooner than February 27 and no later than August 1, 2026. Under the Canada Elections Act, the minimum length of a campaign is 36 days between dropping the writ and election day, but must not exceed 50 days. The by-election must also be held on a Monday within that time frame. Accordingly, the earliest possible date for the by-election was April 6 and the latest was September 28.

On March 8, the writ was issued for a by-election to be held on April 13. Nominations closed on March 23.

== Preparation ==
After reviewing its internal procedures, Elections Canada announced that, to avert the possibility of misdirected ballots in the future, special ballots would no longer be manually prepared by a riding office, and would instead be prepared centrally and automatically at its Ottawa office. However, the change was not expected to be fully implemented until the fall.

== Candidates ==
The candidates in 2025 have reappeared for the by-election:

- Auguste and Sinclair-Desgagné had already been confirmed as candidates before the by-election was called.
- Conservative Adrienne Charles's candidacy was announced on March 11. The Greens are fielding Benjamin Rankin again, as are the NDP with Maxime Beaudoin. Maria Cantore is also returning for the PPC.

The Longest Ballot Committee chose Terrebonne as their target out of three by-elections being held simultaneously. This resulted in a total of 48 candidates when nominations closed, and Elections Canada announced that write-in ballots similar to those used in Battle River—Crowfoot in 2025 would be employed.

== Campaign ==
Sinclair-Desgagné used the slogan Une voix qui compte! ("A voice/vote that counts!"). She promoted the Bloc platform for supporting seniors and first-time home buyers, and voiced concerns over the proposed routing of the Alto high-speed rail line and potential expropriations for it in the riding. Local observers note that, besides the issue of the Alto line, other concerns include the construction of new housing and the decontamination of a former DND firing range to make way for a new interchange on Autoroute 640. Both the Bloc and Liberals agree that the campaign is local. The Liberals are concentrating their efforts on the ground, minimizing participation in local debates, but they still expect the result to be close.

Bloc leader Yves-François Blanchet laughed off suggestions that "fake candidates" could be nominated in the concurrent by-elections being held in Scarborough Southwest and University—Rosedale, in order to create extra campaign financing room in the Terrebonne contest.

At a Liberal rally, Auguste's advocate claimed that she had "won fair and square" in 2025, and that the Supreme Court of Canada (SCC) had later decided that it wanted to punish Elections Canada. At a subsequent Bloc rally, Sinclair-Desgagné described that as saugrenu ("absurd"), and said that people would find it strange that the Liberals would distance themselves from a decision of the SCC where normally it would be embraced by the party. That rally also featured posters bearing the slogan Reprenons notre place le 13 avril ("Let's take back our place/seat on April 13").

It was reported that the advance polls conducted a week before Election Day attracted a turnout of almost 20%, lower than the 25% seen in 2025, but almost double those happening in the Toronto-area by-elections.

== Result ==
Canadian federal by-election, April 13, 2026: Terrebonne 2025 result annulled by Supreme Court
Party	Candidate	Votes	%	±%
Liberal	Tatiana Auguste	22,445	48.32	+9.59
Bloc Québécois	Nathalie Sinclair-Desgagné	21,777	46.89	+8.15
Conservative	Adrienne Charles	1,548	3.33	-14.85
New Democratic	Maxime Beaudoin	248	0.53	-2.05
Green	Benjamin Rankin	194	0.42	-0.63
People's	Maria Cantore	113	0.24	-0.47
Rhinoceros	Mark Moutter	61	0.13	–
Independent	Julie St-Amand	7	0.02	–
Independent	Nicolas Champagne	5	0.01	–
Independent	Geneviève Dorval	4	0.01	–
Independent	Myriam Beaulieu	3	0.01	–
No Affiliation	Sébastien CoRhino	3	0.01	–
Independent	Samuel Pignedoli	3	0.00	–
Independent	Myles René Laurent St. Pierre	3	0.01	–
Independent	Alex Banks	2	0.00	–
Independent	Sophia Bearden	2	0.00	–
Independent	Samuel Ducharme	2	0.00	–
Independent	Elizabeth Dupuis	2	0.00	–
Independent	Laurie Goble	2	0.00	–
Independent	Seyed Hosseini Lavasani	2	0.00	–
Independent	Ryan Huard	2	0.00	–
Independent	Krzysztof Krzywinski	2	0.00	–
Independent	Bryan Wang	2	0.00	–
Independent	Danica Boe	1	0.00	–
Independent	Jenny Cartwright	1	0.00	–
Independent	Jaël Champagne Gareau	1	0.00	–
Independent	Jayson Cowan	1	0.00	–
Independent	Michael Dyck	1	0.00	–
Independent	Anthony Hamel	1	0.00	–
Independent	Chris Kowalchuk	1	0.00	–
Independent	John Francis O'Flynn	1	0.00	–
Independent	Spencer Rocchi	1	0.00	–
Independent	Pascal St-Amand	1	0.00	–
Independent	Vivian Unger	1	0.00	–
Independent	Jeani Boudreault	0	0.00	–
Independent	Gerrit Dogger	0	0.00	–
Independent	Ysack Dupont	0	0.00	–
Independent	Alexandra Engering	0	0.00	–
Independent	Emily Goose	0	0.00	–
Independent	Kazimir Haykowsky	0	0.00	–
Independent	Jack Jean-Louis	0	0.00	–
Independent	Joseph Alain Matthew Laveault	0	0.00	–
Independent	Jocelyn LeBlanc-Courchaine	0	0.00	–
Independent	Lanna Palsson	0	0.00	–
Independent	Lajos Polya	0	0.00	–
Independent	Kayll Schaefer	0	0.00	–
Independent	Justin Steinburg	0	0.00	–
Independent	Alon Weinberg	0	0.00	–
Total valid votes/expense limit		46,443		
Total rejected ballots		371		
Turnout		46,814	51.25	-16.68
Eligible voters		91,344		
Liberal hold		Swing		+0.72
Source: Elections Canada

== Previous results ==
2025 nullified result

2025 Canadian federal election: Terrebonne
Party	Candidate	Votes	%	±%	Expenditures
Liberal	Tatiana Auguste	23,352	38.741	+9.37	$29,829.08
Bloc Québécois	Nathalie Sinclair-Desgagné	23,351	38.739	−2.66	$48,740.91
Conservative	Adrienne Charles	10,961	18.18	+7.73	$7,308.70
New Democratic	Maxime Beaudoin	1,556	2.58	−4.07	$297.98
Green	Benjamin Rankin	630	1.05	−0.38	$0.00
People's	Maria Cantore	428	0.71	−1.97	$1,073.47
Total valid votes		60,278	98.63	+0.88	$135,341.20
Total rejected ballots		840	1.37	–0.88	
Turnout		61,118	67.93	+1.74	
Eligible voters		89,966			
Liberal notional gain from Bloc Québécois		Swing		+6.02	
Source: Elections Canada
Notes: Results were annulled by the Supreme Court of Canada on February 13, 2026. The results were also subject to an automatic judicial recount on May 7, 2025. The number of eligible voters does not include election day registrations.

2021 valid result (redistributed)

2021 federal election redistributed results
Party	Vote	%
Bloc Québécois	23,298	41.40
Liberal	16,528	29.37
Conservative	5,886	10.46
New Democratic	3,742	6.65
People's	1,506	2.68
Green	802	1.43
Others	4,518	8.03

2021 valid result (actual)

2021 Canadian federal election: Terrebonne
Party	Candidate	Votes	%	±%	Expenditures
Bloc Québécois	Nathalie Sinclair-Desgagné	24,270	41.17	-9.42	$28,625.35
Liberal	Eric Forget	17,475	29.64	+0.39	$6,336.80
Conservative	Frédérick Desjardins	6,183	10.49	+2.92	$8,029.08
New Democratic	Luke Mayba	3,913	6.64	-0.91	$7,745.37
Independent	Michel Boudrias	3,864	6.55	N/A	$16,574.97
People's	Louis Stinziani	1,594	2.70	+2.05	$0.00
Green	Dave Hamelin-Schuilenburg	847	1.44	-2.28	$103.94
Free	Nathan Fortin-Dubé	803	1.36	N/A	$25.71
Total valid votes/expense limit		58,949	97.75	–	$119,339.41
Total rejected ballots		1,355	2.25	+0.20	
Turnout		60,304	66.25	-4.06	
Eligible voters		91,028			
Bloc Québécois hold		Swing		-4.90	
Source: Elections Canada
Notes: The incumbent MP, Michel Boudrias, was not renominated as the candidate for the Bloc Quebecois, and subsequently ran as an Independent

== See also ==
- 2025 Terrebonne provincial by-election
- Terrebonne in the 2025 Canadian federal election
