= Tatiana Auguste =

Canadian politician

Tatiana Auguste MP

Member of Parliament for Terrebonne
- Incumbent
- Assumed office April 13, 2026
- Preceded by: Herself
- In office April 28, 2025 – February 13, 2026
- Preceded by: Nathalie Sinclair-Desgagné
- Succeeded by: Herself

Personal details
- Born: 2001 (age 24–25) Port-au-Prince, Haiti
- Party: Liberal
- Education: Concordia University
- Website: tatianaauguste.liberal.ca

Tatiana Auguste (born 2001) is a Canadian politician who is the member of Parliament (MP) for Terrebonne. Elected in the 2025 federal election by a margin of one vote as a member of the Liberal Party of Canada, her election was annulled by the Supreme Court of Canada on February 13, 2026, causing a by-election to be held. Auguste would later win that by-election and reclaim her seat, this time by a wider margin of 668 votes, on April 13, 2026.

== Early life ==
Auguste was born in Port-au-Prince, Haiti, in 2001. Her family immigrated to Canada in 2008, settling in Montreal. She studied economics at Concordia University, afterward working as an e-commerce consultant for the Fédération des chambres de commerce du Québec. Auguste also worked as an assistant to Bourassa MP Emmanuel Dubourg. At the time of the 2025 Canadian federal election, she lived in Montréal-Nord.

== Political career ==
Auguste ran as the Liberal candidate for the riding of Terrebonne in the 2025 federal election. She was thought to have defeated incumbent Bloc Québécois MP Nathalie Sinclair-Desgagné by 35 votes in the initial vote count. However, subsequent validation of the count by Elections Canada showed that Sinclair-Desgagné had retained her seat by a 44-vote margin. Due to the tight margin, an automatic recount was called. On May 10, 2025, the judicial recount in the Superior Court of Quebec flipped the seat back to Auguste by a one-vote margin, the narrowest result in the country. She was one of four people born in the 21st century elected to the House of Commons in the 2025 election. Auguste called the experience "a rollercoaster. From winning to not winning, and then winning again".

On May 13, a Bloc Québécois voter disclosed that her mail-in ballot had been returned to her due to a postal code misprint on the envelope provided her by Elections Canada. After Elections Canada said that it did not have legal standing to change the result, Bloc Québécois announced on May 15 that it would seek a court order for a new by-election. The same day, Elections Canada stated that five other mail ballots with the incorrect returning address printed had been rejected because they had arrived at the Elections Canada office in the riding after the deadline; the statement said that it could not determine if the incorrect address was responsible. The election result was upheld on October 27 by the Superior Court of Quebec. On November 3, Sinclair-Desgagné announced that she would be appealing the ruling to the Supreme Court of Canada. On February 13, 2026, the Supreme Court annulled the result of the election in the riding, leaving the seat vacant.

Auguste won the ensuing by-election on April 13, 2026, defeating Sinclair-Desgagné by a margin of 668 votes.

== Electoral record ==
Canadian federal by-election, April 13, 2026: Terrebonne 2025 result annulled by Supreme Court
Party	Candidate	Votes	%	±%
Liberal	Tatiana Auguste	22,445	48.32	+9.59
Bloc Québécois	Nathalie Sinclair-Desgagné	21,777	46.89	+8.15
Conservative	Adrienne Charles	1,548	3.33	-14.85
New Democratic	Maxime Beaudoin	248	0.53	-2.05
Green	Benjamin Rankin	194	0.42	-0.63
People's	Maria Cantore	113	0.24	-0.47
Rhinoceros	Mark Moutter	61	0.13	–
Independent	Julie St-Amand	7	0.02	–
Independent	Nicolas Champagne	5	0.01	–
Independent	Geneviève Dorval	4	0.01	–
Independent	Myriam Beaulieu	3	0.01	–
No Affiliation	Sébastien CoRhino	3	0.01	–
Independent	Samuel Pignedoli	3	0.00	–
Independent	Myles René Laurent St. Pierre	3	0.01	–
Independent	Alex Banks	2	0.00	–
Independent	Sophia Bearden	2	0.00	–
Independent	Samuel Ducharme	2	0.00	–
Independent	Elizabeth Dupuis	2	0.00	–
Independent	Laurie Goble	2	0.00	–
Independent	Seyed Hosseini Lavasani	2	0.00	–
Independent	Ryan Huard	2	0.00	–
Independent	Krzysztof Krzywinski	2	0.00	–
Independent	Bryan Wang	2	0.00	–
Independent	Danica Boe	1	0.00	–
Independent	Jenny Cartwright	1	0.00	–
Independent	Jaël Champagne Gareau	1	0.00	–
Independent	Jayson Cowan	1	0.00	–
Independent	Michael Dyck	1	0.00	–
Independent	Anthony Hamel	1	0.00	–
Independent	Chris Kowalchuk	1	0.00	–
Independent	John Francis O'Flynn	1	0.00	–
Independent	Spencer Rocchi	1	0.00	–
Independent	Pascal St-Amand	1	0.00	–
Independent	Vivian Unger	1	0.00	–
Independent	Jeani Boudreault	0	0.00	–
Independent	Gerrit Dogger	0	0.00	–
Independent	Ysack Dupont	0	0.00	–
Independent	Alexandra Engering	0	0.00	–
Independent	Emily Goose	0	0.00	–
Independent	Kazimir Haykowsky	0	0.00	–
Independent	Jack Jean-Louis	0	0.00	–
Independent	Joseph Alain Matthew Laveault	0	0.00	–
Independent	Jocelyn LeBlanc-Courchaine	0	0.00	–
Independent	Lanna Palsson	0	0.00	–
Independent	Lajos Polya	0	0.00	–
Independent	Kayll Schaefer	0	0.00	–
Independent	Justin Steinburg	0	0.00	–
Independent	Alon Weinberg	0	0.00	–
Total valid votes/expense limit		46,443		
Total rejected ballots		371		
Turnout		46,814	51.25	-16.68
Eligible voters		91,344		
Liberal hold		Swing		+0.72
Source: Elections Canada

2025 Canadian federal election: Terrebonne
Party	Candidate	Votes	%	±%	Expenditures
Liberal	Tatiana Auguste	23,352	38.741	+9.37	$29,829.08
Bloc Québécois	Nathalie Sinclair-Desgagné	23,351	38.739	−2.66	$48,740.91
Conservative	Adrienne Charles	10,961	18.18	+7.73	$7,308.70
New Democratic	Maxime Beaudoin	1,556	2.58	−4.07	$297.98
Green	Benjamin Rankin	630	1.05	−0.38	$0.00
People's	Maria Cantore	428	0.71	−1.97	$1,073.47
Total valid votes		60,278	98.63	+0.88	$135,341.20
Total rejected ballots		840	1.37	–0.88	
Turnout		61,118	67.93	+1.74	
Eligible voters		89,966			
Liberal notional gain from Bloc Québécois		Swing		+6.02	
Source: Elections Canada
Notes: Results were annulled by the Supreme Court of Canada on February 13, 2026. The results were also subject to an automatic judicial recount on May 7, 2025. The number of eligible voters does not include election day registrations.
