= Don Meredith (politician) =

Canadian politician (born 1964)

The Honourable Don Meredith
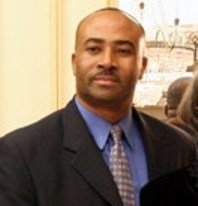
- Meredith during his unsuccessful 2008 campaign

Canadian Senator from Ontario
- In office 18 December 2010 – 10 May 2017
- Nominated by: Stephen Harper
- Appointed by: David Johnston
- Preceded by: Peter Stollery

Personal details
- Born: 13 July 1964 (age 61) Saint Ann, Jamaica
- Party: Non-affiliated
- Other political affiliations: Conservative (2010-2015); Non-affiliated (2015-2017)

Donald Meredith (born 13 July 1964) is a Canadian Pentecostal minister and former politician. Meredith was appointed to the Senate of Canada on 18 December 2010 as a Conservative. He was expelled from the Conservative caucus on 17 June 2015, however, following allegations that he had groomed a teenager for two years, starting when the girl was 16. He was found guilty of ethics violations by the Senate ethics office in March 2017.

The Senate Ethics Committee recommend in May 2017 that Meredith be expelled from the Senate. He announced his resignation on 9 May, before a vote could occur; his resignation took effect the next day.

Meredith was also the Conservative candidate in the March 17, 2008 federal by-election in Toronto Centre. He received 12.5% of the vote, and placed fourth behind Liberal victor Bob Rae.

== Background ==
Born and raised in Jamaica, Meredith immigrated to Canada and became a Canadian citizen in the early 1980s. He attended Ryerson Polytechnical Institute but never graduated; while he was a student at Ryerson, he began Donscape Landscaping Services (c. 1994), which he still owns and operates.

Meredith was ordained a minister in 2006, is a graduate of Rhema Studies of Theology Association, which is a non-degree granting association. He is the volunteer senior pastor at the Pentecostal Praise Centre in Maple, Ontario close to Richmond Hill, Ontario where he now lives. Meredith is a member of the Chief's Advisory Council for the Toronto Police Services; he was also a member of the York Regional Police Police Community Advisory Council (PCAC) from 2004 until 2012, as well as a member of the Royal Canadian Mounted Police Consultative Committee since 2005. He is the former Co-Chair of the Black Community Police Consultative Committee, an advisory group of community members who advise the police on various issues. Meredith participated in the "Black Family Summit," held in August 2006, he described the event as "a great way to meet young women".

== Early political career ==
In December 2007, he was nominated by the Conservative Party of Canada as its candidate in the downtown Toronto riding of Toronto Centre federal by-election held on March 17, 2008. Meredith won the Conservative nomination by acclamation several weeks after the party controversially removed Mark Warner as its standard-bearer. Meredith placed fourth in the by-election which saw him receiving 12.5% of the vote, down from the 18.2% received by the Conservative candidate in the 2006 federal election and also down from the 18.3% that the Conservative candidate would receive in the federal election held seven months after the by-election.

Meredith is a social conservative who has spoken out against pre-marital sex and stated that "when we have marriages, we don't have these social problems." Meredith has also stated that he would like to see the age of sexual consent raised to 18 from 14 which was at odds with the then-Conservative government's stated intention to raise the age of consent from 14 to 16. Nonetheless, Meredith had supported New Democratic Party (NDP) Member of Parliament (MP) Bill Siksay's private member's bill to add gender identity to the list of distinguishable group traits protected from hate speech by the Criminal Code and to allow judges to take into account whether crimes were motivated by hatred of transgender or transsexual people when determining the offender's sentence. In opposition, Stephen Harper had opposed Siksay's predecessor, former NDP MP Svend Robinson's successful private member's bill that added sexual orientation to the law in 2004.

== Senator ==
Meredith was appointed to the Canadian Senate on 18 December 2010 on the advice of Prime Minister Harper, and joined the Conservative caucus.

In September 2012, Meredith was criticized for attending a cultural event at Carleton University organized by the Iranian embassy at a time when the Canadian government was urging a boycott of Iran. In contravention of his government's position on Iran, Meredith travelled to Iran in 2012 in attempts to forge business deals with the government.

In 2014, despite not being authorized by the Senate, he attended the National Prayer Breakfast for notable preachers and politicians in the United States. Meredith expensed the first class trip for himself and his wife along with the hotel cost to the Senate and was later forced to repay the expense.

=== Harassment complaints and sexual misconduct investigation ===
Workplace harassment and bullying in Meredith's office were first brought up with a human resources manager in 2013. Two years later, in February 2015, Quintet Consulting Corp, a third-party firm, was hired to investigate because Pierre Claude Nolin, the Speaker of the Senate of Canada, had noticed a higher than usual turnover rate in Meredith's office. The Quintet report was submitted in July 2015 and led to Meredith being formally investigated by the Office of the Senate Ethics Officer. Meredith initially denied that an ethics investigation existed despite having been interviewed for it. The ethics investigation included allegations of unwanted sexual advances, innuendo, and rude behaviour from eight women: four of Meredith's former staffers and four Senate employees.

Meredith was expelled from the Conservative caucus on 17 June 2015, following allegations that he had groomed a teenager for two years, beginning when the girl was 16. In October 2015, the Office of the Senate Ethics Officer suspended its investigation pending the result of the concurrent police investigation that took over the file. Ultimately the teenager, known by the pseudonym, "Ms. M," declined to press criminal charges to protect her identity. After the police investigation was dropped the Senate ethics office investigation resumed in February 2016 and found him guilty of ethics violations in March 2017 after he conceded he had sexual intercourse with the woman after she turned 18. The woman said that Meredith "continually encouraged her to be in a relationship with him" and that he frequently masturbated on-camera during video chats while he was in his GTA Faith Alliance office. Meredith called the encouragement a gross lie and did not recall masturbating, but said that if he did "it was an interaction". Meredith was expelled from the Independent Senators Group he had joined the previous year.

Meredith repeatedly apologizing for his "moral failing" and begging forgiveness but refused to step down, while taking sick leave on doctor's orders. He claimed to be a victim of racism in this affair, with his first lawyer Selwyn Pieters suggesting "his client was being portrayed as a "sexual predator" because he is an imposing black man". Meredith replaced Pieters with Bill Trudell as his new attorney, the latter who believed that the race card approach would not be helpful in Meredith's defense. Despite growing calls for Meredith's resignation from the Senate, Trudell argued "for a one- or two-year suspension without pay as a form of punishment for his two-year sexual relationship with a teenage girl".

Meredith announced on 9 May 2017 that he would be resigning from the Senate. The announcement came shortly after the Senate Ethics Committee found that his conduct "demonstrated that he is unfit to serve as a senator" as "He has abused his privileged position of authority and trust by engaging in behaviour that is incompatible with his office", and "No lesser sanction than expulsion would repair the harm he has done to the Senate". Although the Senate has no explicit power to expel a member, a situation unprecedented in Canadian history, the Ethics Committee "accepted the legal opinion of the law clerk and parliamentary counsel to the Senate that the Constitution gives the upper house the same privileges enjoyed by the United Kingdom's House of Commons, which can permanently eject a member". Had Meredith not agreed to resign voluntarily, it was "virtually certain his former colleagues would have voted overwhelmingly" to expel him. In his resignation letter he stated that "the path of expulsion being considered by [his] colleagues will have major implications for the Senate of Canada" and that "this is a constitutional fight in which [he] will not engage." His resignation took effect on 10 May 2017. By resigning to avoid expulsion, Meredith retained his eligibility for a Parliamentary pension.

The Senate Ethics Officer's report was published in June 2019 and concluded that Meredith's behaviour "constitute[d] both harassment and sexual harassment." In June 2020, the Senate made a formal apology to Meredith's victims. In September 2020, following recommendations in a report by former Quebec Court of Appeal judge Louise Otis, the Senate internal economy committee authorized financial compensation for Meredith's victims. The total financial compensation to nine of Meredith's former employees totaled $498,000.

In November 2022, the Senate adopted a resolution to urge the Governor General to revoke the honorific style and title of “Honourable”" from Meredith.

=== Sexual assault charges ===
On 1 October 2022, Meredith was charged with three counts of sexual assault and one count of criminal harassment of an adult woman in 2013 and 2014. Meredith was released on a promise to appear in court and on the condition that he remain in Ottawa.

Meredith was acquitted of all charges, including sexual assault and criminal harassment on October 29, 2025.

== Credentials ==
Meredith claims an honorary degree from an association of Christian counsellors, the Canadian Christian Clinical Counsellors' Association, that has no standing as a degree-granting school and has been signing himself as "The Honourable Dr. Don Meredith" since receiving the honour. Meredith stopped calling himself a doctor after his credentials were questioned and he was called upon to substantiate his educational credentials. Meredith also claims to have earned a bachelor's and master's degree in religious studies from California State Christian University, an unaccredited, unregulated school which is not recognized by either the Association of Theological Schools in the United States and Canada and is not permitted by the state of California to grant graduate degrees.

== Awards ==
In 2006, Meredith received an Urban Leadership Award from the Canadian Urban Institute for being an "outspoken advocate against crime and for the advancement of a just society".

In 2008, he received the Toronto Police Service 13 Division Community Service Award.

In 2012, he received the Nelson Mandela Humanitarian Award and the BBPA Youth Advocacy Award.

== Electoral record ==
Canadian federal by-election, March 17, 2008: Toronto Centre Resignation of Bill Graham
Party	Candidate	Votes	%	±%
Liberal	Bob Rae	14,187	59.2	+7.0
New Democratic	El-Farouk Khaki	3,299	13.8	−9.9
Green	Chris Tindal	3,263	13.6	+8.4
Conservative	Donald Meredith	2,982	12.5	−5.7
Animal Alliance	Liz White	123	0.5	+0.4
Canadian Action	Doug Plumb	97	0.4	-
Liberal hold		Swing		+8.5
