= El-Farouk Khaki =

Canadian queer Muslim activist and lawyer (born 1963)

El-Farouk Khaki LL.B
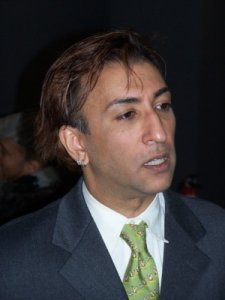
- Khaki in 2007 at the public launch of his run for NDP nomination in the federal riding of Toronto Centre

Personal details
- Born: October 26, 1963 (age 62) Tanzania
- Party: New Democratic Party
- Spouse: Troy Jackson
- Education: University of British Columbia

El-Farouk Khaki (born October 26, 1963 in Tanzania) is a Canadian immigration lawyer and human rights activist on issues including gender equality, sexual orientation, and progressive Islam. He was the New Democratic Party's candidate for the House of Commons in the riding of Toronto Centre in a March 17, 2008 by-election. Khaki came in second with 13.8% of the vote.

== Biography ==
He was born in Tanzania, which his family fled in 1971 escaping political persecution. His parents arrived in Canada in 1974 and settled in Vancouver where Khaki grew up. He earned a law degree from the University of British Columbia before moving to Ottawa in 1988 and has lived and worked in Toronto since 1989. He worked as a political staffer at Queen's Park until 1993 when he left to establish his legal practice. Khaki is a member of the Law Society of Upper Canada and has been in private practice since 1993. On June 26, 2014, he married his longtime partner Troy Jackson.

== Activism ==
Khaki founded Salaam in 1991, a support group for gay Muslims.

In 2003, he helped organize the first female-led, mixed-gender Muslim congregational prayers in Canada for the Salaam/Al-Fateha International Conference, and in 2005, organized the first such prayers anywhere to be held in a mosque. He has served on the Toronto Mayor's Committee on Community & Race Relations, on the board of The 519 Community Centre, and is now elected chair of Africans in Partnership Against AIDS.

Khaki regularly speaks publicly at events and in news media on issues ranging from refugee protection, to the global AIDS crisis, Canadian multiculturalism, racism, persecution of sexual minorities around the world, and religious and racial profiling in the war on terror, among other topics. His appearances include CTV's morning television program Canada AM, CBC Radio One's The Current, and others.

On April 30, 2007, Khaki won the New Democratic Party's nomination in Toronto Centre. Incumbent Bill Graham resigned necessitating a by-election held on March 17, 2008. The by-election was won by Bob Rae.

Khaki was the 2009 parade grand marshal for Toronto's pride parade.

In May 2009, The Toronto Unity Mosque / el-Tawhid Juma Circle was founded by Laury Silvers, a University of Toronto religious studies scholar, alongside Muslim gay-rights activists Imam El-Farouk Khaki and Troy Jackson. Unity Mosque/ETJC is a gender-equal, LGBT+ affirming, mosque.

In 2016, Khaki was named by The Advocate magazine to a list of "21 LGBT Muslims Who Are Changing the World." In 2018, El-Farouk participated in a TEDxUTSC talk about intersectionality and validity of gay Muslims

=== Refugee law ===
In 1994, Khaki represented a refugee claim before the Immigration and Refugee Board of Canada which lasted eight sittings rather than the usual single session and led to the implementation of sensitivity training for IRB Members and staff on sexual orientation issues.

Khaki continues to specialize in representing before the IRB a variety of severely marginalized social groups, such as persons living with HIV/AIDS and women fleeing domestic violence or other gender-based persecution.

=== Progressive Islam ===
Khaki founded Salaam, the first gay Muslim group in Canada and second in the world, in 1993, and organized the Salaam/Al-Fateha International Conference in 2003. He co-founded and served as Secretary General of the Muslim Canadian Congress, in August 2006 until the group split. Khaki and other members including much of the leadership of the MCC created a new organization, the Canadian Muslim Union (CMU). He also founded, with academic Laury Silvers, and his partner Troy Jackson the El-Tawhid Juma Circle. ETJC is a gender-equal, LGBTQ affirming space for Friday prayers.

=== Israel ===
On May 23, 2009, Khaki made the opening remarks at a Queers Against Israeli Apartheid event to "reignite Toronto’s queer community in the fight against apartheid". Shortly after, B'nai Brith condemned him and implied that he is "part and parcel of the anti-Israel machinery that continues to churn out hateful and divisive propaganda."

B'nai Brith executive vice-president Frank Dimant said Khaki should be subject to "disciplinary action" by Pride Toronto.

In response, Khaki with his partner Troy Jackson formed the Human Positive foundation, an organization which goal is "Justice, Freedom and Dignity for All peoples" and rejects the idea that criticism of the government of Israel is equivalent to antisemitism.

In 2009, his Human+ Float was the recipient of Best Embodiment of the LGBTTIQQ2S award from Pride Toronto.

=== Electoral record ===
Canadian federal by-election, March 17, 2008: Toronto Centre Resignation of Bill Graham
| Party | Candidate | Votes | % | ±% |
|---|---|---|---|---|
| Liberal | Bob Rae | 14,187 | 59.2 | +7.0 |
| New Democratic | El-Farouk Khaki | 3,299 | 13.8 | −9.9 |
| Green | Chris Tindal | 3,263 | 13.6 | +8.4 |
| Conservative | Donald Meredith | 2,982 | 12.5 | −5.7 |
| Animal Alliance | Liz White | 123 | 0.5 | +0.4 |
| Canadian Action | Doug Plumb | 97 | 0.4 | - |
| Liberal hold | | Swing | | +8.5 |

2008 Canadian federal election
| Party | Candidate | Votes | % | ±% |
|---|---|---|---|---|
| Liberal | Bob Rae | 27,577 | 53.6% | -5.6% |
| Conservative | David Gentili | 9,405 | 18.3% | +5.8% |
| New Democratic | El-Farouk Khaki | 7,744 | 15.1% | +1.3% |
| Green | Ellen Michelson | 6,081 | 11.8% | -1.8% |
| Communist | Johan Boyden | 193 | 0.4% | +0.2%** |
| Animal Alliance | Liz White | 187 | 0.4% | -0.1% |
| Independent | Gerald Derome | 155 | 0.3% | n/a |
| Marxist–Leninist | Philip Fernandez | 92 | 0.2% | +0.09%** |
| Total valid votes | | 51,434 | | |
| Total rejected ballots | | – | | |
| Turnout | | – | 59.2% | |

== Awards ==
Khaki was honoured at the 2006 Pride Week gala for his role in promoting queer Muslim awareness through Salaam. Reverend Brent Hawkes of the Toronto Metropolitan Community Church said of Khaki and the group, "I think Salaam is very important, both locally and internationally, in terms of creating a safe place for people of Muslim tradition to be able to come together both socially and spiritually". Of Khaki's role, he said "The work that El-Farouk has done is to help to make sure there is an option there."

In spring 2007, Khaki received the Steinert and Ferreiro Award from the Lesbian and Gay Community Appeal Foundation for his "major role in paving the way in Canada for refugee protection on the grounds of sexual orientation and gender", and because he "broke ground" in his work on gender equality in the Muslim community. The previous summer, Pride Toronto, one of the world's largest gay-pride festivals, recognized his work building tolerance and inclusiveness in the Muslim community with the 2006 Pride Award for Excellence in Spirituality. Also in 2007, Khaki was honoured with the Canadian Bar Association's Sexual Orientation and Gender Identity Conference Hero Award for contributions made in the area of equality for lesbian, gay, bisexual, and transgender people for his work with refugees who are sexual minorities or suffering from HIV.

== Media mentions ==
"21 LGBT Muslims Who Are Changing the World." The Advocate. December 20, 2016. Web.
