= Dan Goldstick =

Canadian professor and political activist

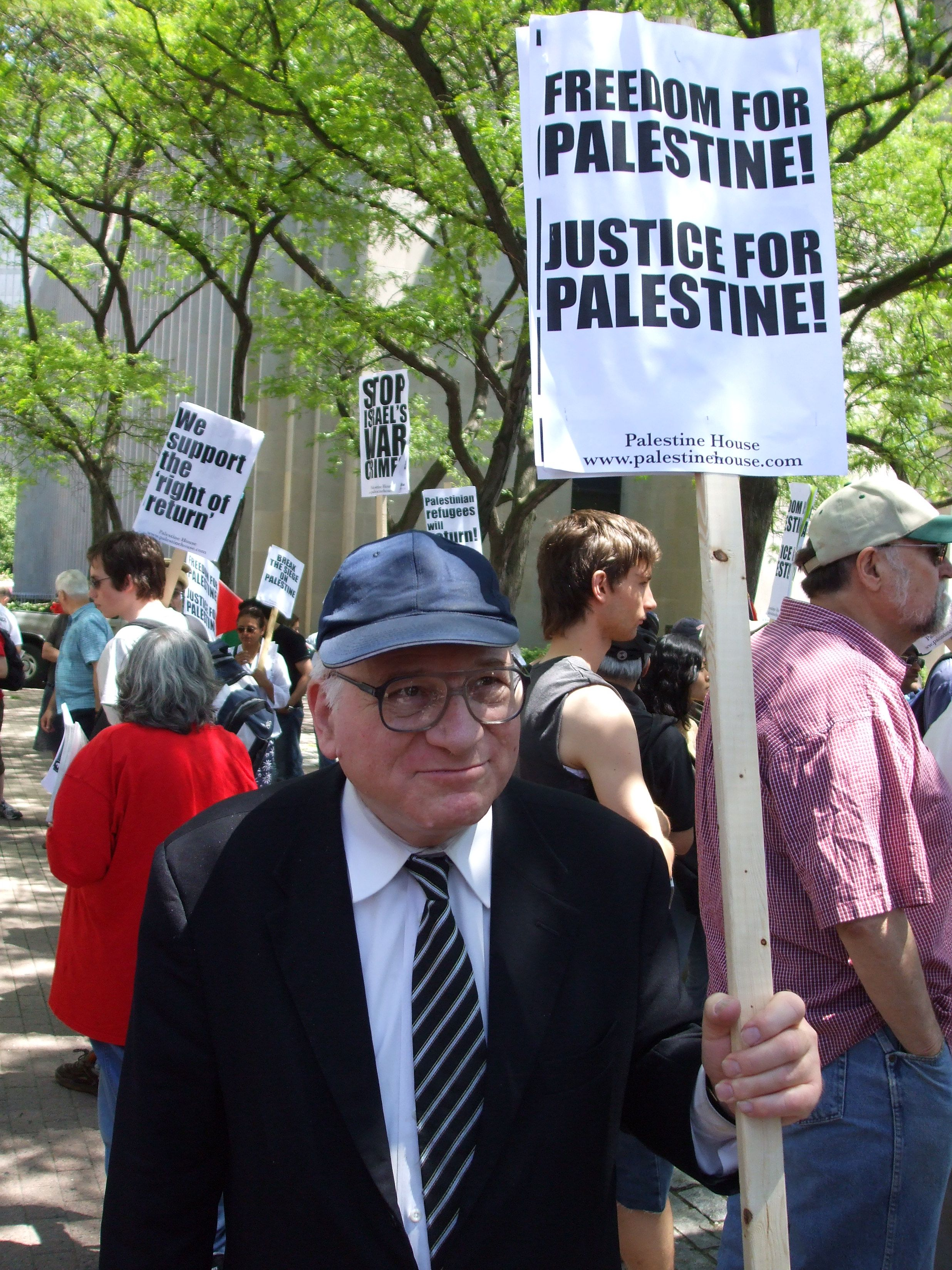
- Born: 1940 (age 85–86); Toronto, Ontario, Canada

Philosophical work
- Era: Contemporary philosophy
- Region: Western philosophy
- School: Marxist philosophy, pre-Kantian rationalism
- Main interests: Marxism, ethics, epistemology, metaphysics
- Notable ideas: A priori probabilities, universal impermanence thesis, Goldstickian principle of simplicity

Daniel "Danny" Goldstick (born 1940) is a Canadian philosopher, writer and political activist. He is currently a Professor Emeritus at the University of Toronto.

== Academic biography ==
Goldstick was born in Toronto. He received his B.A. from the University of Toronto in 1962, and went on to graduate studies at Oxford University, where he received a B.Phil in 1964 and D.Phil. in 1969, although he returned to Canada in 1965; his thesis, under the supervision of Alfred Jules Ayer, attempted to refute empiricism. In 1965, he took a position as a lecturer at Carleton University, and in 1967, became an assistant professor there, but in the same year he moved back to Toronto after philosophy department members David Savan and David Gauthier persuaded the other faculty to overlook his radical politics.

At Toronto, Goldstick taught Marxism, synthetic apriority, and ethics. His work in philosophy centres on topics in metaphysics and epistemology. His philosophical work consists of approximately 75 papers, including:

- "Methodological Conservatism" (Am. Phil. Quart. 1971);
- "Dialectics versus Metaphysics" (Explorations in Knowledge, 1988);
- "Cognitive Reason" (Philosophy and Phenomenological Research, 1992)

He is the author of Reason, Truth, and Reality, a "defense of pre-Kantian rationalism". The book asks what sort of world do we inhabit? and what moral obligations do we have? According to reviewer Peter Tramel, his effort culminates in arguments for universal impermanence, continuous deterministic causality, and utilitarianism. Others claim that, "at its core, this book is addressing the Marxian concern with relating theory to practice."

In 2024, the University of Toronto's Department of Philosophy held an event to spotlight Goldstick's philosophical work and contributions to pedagogy. Presenters engaged with Goldstick's treatment of epistemology, ethics, and political philosophy.

== Activism ==
Goldstick came from a progressive Jewish family. His mother was a lawyer and anti-war activist and friends with politicians like J. S. Woodsworth and Tim Buck. According to Hewitt (2002), Goldstick has been the subject of illicit Royal Canadian Mounted Police (RCMP) surveillance since the age of 15.

As a high school student, Goldstick was a member of the National Federation of Labor Youth. He became politically involved in student movement politics at the University of Toronto while an undergraduate there in the 1950s. Later, he campaigned with a young Tariq Ali at Oxford against the Vietnam War. Since returning to Canada he has worked on many direct action campaigns including students issues like tuition reduction and elimination; against sexism, homophobia and racism such as the Dr Chun case; international solidarity with the ANC, Black Panthers, Angela Davis, and FMLN; as well as electoral politics on the municipal, provincial and federal level. For many years he was involved in the University of Toronto Marxist Institute. Goldstick is currently a member of the Council of Canadians and is active in peace, anti-war, and Palestinian solidarity movements. He is a member of Not In Our Name, an anti-Zionist group and has participated each week since the mid 2000s in a picket of Chapters Indigo bookstore on Bay Street. He is a supporter of the Canadian Peace Alliance and presented on "Sovereignty and Global Peace" at the 2010 Canadian Peace Research Association.

=== Advocacy of Atheism ===
Goldstick has been involved in debates across Canada on the existence of God. He has publicly debated writers such as Micheal R. Butler, attempting to refute Butler's Transcendental argument for God. Goldstick maintains that an omnipotent God must be able to accomplish anything, even if it entails a contradiction—genocide, famine, etc. On this account, the Christian God cannot be omnipotent and benevolent, for a benevolent, omnipotent God would have prevented the introduction of suffering into the world. He is a faculty advisor of the U of T Secular Alliance and a founding member of the Humanist Association of Toronto

=== Communist Party of Canada ===
Goldstick is a long-time member of the Central Committee of the Communist Party of Canada and a former member of its Executive, working closely with Miguel Figueroa and Elizabeth Rowley. He has been a frequent candidate at the federal and provincial level for the CPC. Goldstick is the founding editor of the Communist Party's theoretical journal The Spark. His recent editorials have addressed the state and nationalization, the economic crisis, and democracy.

=== Federal electoral record ===
As Slater (2005) writes, Goldstick has frequently stood for office as the communist candidate in the parliamentary elections for the Rosedale district, which has approximately 100 communist voters. Although never been elected, "Red Danny" is still remembered for his sense of humor, satire and wit during public all-candidates meetings—sometimes even getting the strongest applause from audiences by the end of debates.

- 1974 Canadian federal election, Rosedale, 136 votes (winner: Donald Stovel Macdonald, Liberal)
- by-election 1978, Rosedale, 120 votes (winner: David Crombie, Progressive Conservative)
- 1979 Canadian federal election, Rosedale, 80 votes (winner: David Crombie, Progressive Conservative)
- 1980 Canadian federal election, Rosedale, 85 votes (winner: David Crombie, Progressive Conservative)
- 1988 Canadian federal election, Etobicoke Centre, 81 votes (winner: Michael Wilson, Progressive Conservative)
- 1993 Canadian federal election, York South—Weston, 119 votes (winner: John Nunziata, Liberal) (note: Goldstick ran as an independent in this election, as the Communist Party of Canada was not recognized as an official party. He was listed on the ballot as "Danny Red Goldstick")
- 2000 Canadian federal election, Toronto Centre—Rosedale, 121 votes (winner: Bill Graham, Liberal)
- 2004 Canadian federal election, Toronto Centre, 106 votes (winner: Bill Graham, Liberal)
