= Liz White (activist) =

Canadian animal rights activist and politician

Elizabeth White
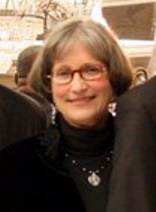
- White at a debate during the 2008 Toronto Centre by-election

Leader of the Animal Protection Party of Canada
- Incumbent
- Assumed office August 2, 2005
- Preceded by: Office established

Personal details
- Born: c. 1950
- Party: Animal Protection

Elizabeth White (born c. 1950) is a Canadian animal rights activist and politician.

== Early life ==
White was born in Toronto, to parents who both were teachers. She earned a nursing degree at McGill University, and then worked in Kitchener, before moving back to Toronto a few years later. She was involved in political organizing, first with the New Democratic Party, beginning from age 20.

== Career ==
White is a founder and board member of the Animal Alliance of Canada, a non-profit organization set up in 1991, where she focuses on legislative issues, municipal animal control by-laws, hunting and human-wildlife conflict, and fundraising.

White also leads the Animal Protection Party of Canada (formerly the Animal Alliance Environment Voters Party of Canada), a federal political party registered by the Animal Alliance in 2005 with the aim of winning air time to discuss issues other parties might not raise, and to allow donors to receive tax credit. She stood unsuccessfully for election in Toronto-area ridings in 2006, 2008, 2011, 2015, 2019, 2021, and 2025.

White is an opponent of the annual Canadian seal hunt, and as a result supports a boycott of Canada's seafood industry. She has also campaigned against the sale of dogs from the Winnipeg city pound to animal researchers. She was one of three women (along with Lesli Bisgould of the University of Toronto and Shelagh MacDonald of the Canadian Federation of Humane Societies) who drafted Bill C-17B/C-10B, an anti-cruelty bill that among other things called for animals to be regarded as "living property." The Bill passed the House of Commons twice, but was defeated in the Senate in 2008.

== Electoral record ==
2025 Canadian federal election: Toronto—Danforth
Party	Candidate	Votes	%	±%	Expenditures
Liberal	Julie Dabrusin	38,794	66.56	+18.20	
Conservative	Ashik Hussain	11,060	18.98	+6.42	
New Democratic	Clare Hacksel	7,554	12.96	–20.71	
Green	Silvia Stardust	625	1.07	–0.89	
Animal Protection	Liz White	250	0.43	+0.05	
Total valid votes/expense limit					
Total rejected ballots					
Turnout		58,283	71.16		
Eligible voters		81,901			
Liberal notional hold		Swing		+5.89	
Source: Elections Canada

2021 Canadian federal election: Toronto—Danforth
Party	Candidate	Votes	%	±%	Expenditures
Liberal	Julie Dabrusin	23,038	48.41	+0.58	$77,319.65
New Democratic	Clare Hacksel	15,881	33.28	+0.08	$94,784.85
Conservative	Michael Carey	6,105	12.83	+2.29	$25,348.44
People's	Wayne Simmons	1,238	2.59	+1.49	$766.61
Green	Maryem Tollar	949	1.99	-4.51	$2,899.08
Communist	Elizabeth Rowley	204	0.43	+0.13	$0.00
Animal Protection	Liz White	179	0.38	-0.02	$3,315.07
Independent	Habiba Desai	125	0.26		$510.82
Total valid votes/expense limit		47,719	–	–	$110,583.29
Total rejected ballots					
Turnout		47,719	59.84		
Eligible voters		79,749			
Liberal hold		Swing		+0.25	
Source: Elections Canada

2019 Canadian federal election: University—Rosedale
Party	Candidate	Votes	%	±%	Expenditures
Liberal	Chrystia Freeland	29,652	51.67	+1.87	$83,556.09
New Democratic	Melissa Jean-Baptiste Vajda	12,573	21.91	−6.68	$28,390.50
Conservative	Helen-Claire Tingling	9,342	16.28	−1.23	$38,588.65
Green	Tim Grant	4,861	8.47	+5.54	$33,386.65
People's	Aran Lockwood	510	0.89	–	none listed
Animal Protection	Liz White	159	0.28	+0.05	none listed
Communist	Drew Garvie	143	0.25	+0.03	none listed
Stop Climate Change	Karin Brothers	124	0.22	–	none listed
Marxist–Leninist	Steve Rutschinski	27	0.05	−0.04	none listed
Total valid votes/expense limit		57,391	99.51		
Total rejected ballots		281	0.49	-0.05	
Turnout		57,672	69.08	-3.74	
Eligible voters		83,485			
Liberal hold		Swing		+4.28	
Source: Elections Canada

2015 Canadian federal election: Etobicoke—Lakeshore
Party	Candidate	Votes	%	±%	Expenditures
Liberal	James Maloney	34,638	53.70	+18.60	$154,037.25
Conservative	Bernard Trottier	20,932	32.45	-7.78	$114,083.23
New Democratic	Phil Trotter	7,030	10.90	-9.40	$27,861.80
Green	Angela Salewsky	1,507	2.34	-1.68	$2,045.10
Animal Alliance	Liz White	233	0.36	–	$4,975.83
Marxist–Leninist	Janice Murray	168	0.26	-0.10	–
Total valid votes/expense limit		64,508	99.53		$233,887.62
Total rejected ballots		307	0.47		
Turnout		64,815	69.04		
Eligible voters		93,880			
Liberal gain from Conservative		Swing		+13.19	
Source: Elections Canada

2011 Canadian federal election: Thornhill
Party	Candidate	Votes	%	±%	Expenditures
Conservative	Peter Kent	36,629	61.38	+12.37	$85,817.95
Liberal	Karen Mock	14,125	23.67	-15.76	$89,258.36
New Democratic	Simon Strelchik	7,141	11.97	+5.35	$5,397.91
Green	Norbert Koehl	1,562	2.62	-2.32	$11,470.40
Animal Alliance	Liz White	215	0.36	–	$7,002.05
Total valid votes/Expense limit		59,672	100.00	–	$99,784.20
Total rejected ballots		275	0.46	–	
Turnout		59,947	60.98	–	
Eligible voters		98,312	–	–	

2008 Canadian federal election: Toronto Centre (federal electoral district)
Party	Candidate	Votes	%	±%	Expenditures
Liberal	Bob Rae	27,462	53.53	-5.94	$ 48,353.21
Conservative	David Gentili	9,402	18.33	+6.01	39,290.89
New Democratic	El-Farouk Khaki	7,743	15.09	+1.21	21,305.27
Green	Ellen Michelson	6,081	11.85	-1.56	23,041.16
Communist	Johan Boyden	193	0.38		432.31
Animal Alliance	Liz White	187	0.36	-0.16	685.91
Independent	Gerald Derome	146	0.28		2,063.60
Marxist–Leninist	Philip Fernandez	92	0.18		–
Total valid votes/Expense limit/Total Expenditures		51,306	100.00	$ 92,067.97	$ 135,172.35
Total rejected ballots		257	0.50		
Turnout		51,563	57.39		

By-election on March 17, 2008: Toronto Centre On Bill Graham's resignation, July 2, 2007
Party	Candidate	Votes	%	±%
Liberal	Bob Rae	14,187	59.47	+7.24
New Democratic	El-Farouk Khaki	3,312	13.88	-9.86
Green	Chris Tindal	3,199	13.41	+8.20
Conservative	Donald Meredith	2,939	12.32	-5.89
Animal Alliance	Liz White	123	0.52	+0.40
Canadian Action	Doug Plumb	97	0.41	
Total valid votes		23,857	100.00	
Total rejected ballots		96	0.40	
Turnout		23,953	27.86	
Liberal hold		Swing	+8.5	

2006 Canadian federal election: Toronto Centre (federal electoral district)
Party	Candidate	Votes	%	±%
Liberal	Bill Graham	30,874	52.23	-4.30
New Democratic	Michael Shapcott	14,036	23.74	-0.01
Conservative	Lewis Reford	10,763	18.21	+3.42
Green	Chris Tindal	3,080	5.21	+1.30
Communist	Johan Boyden	120	0.2	-0.05
Independent	Michel Prairie	101	0.2	
Animal Alliance	Liz White	72	0.12	
Marxist–Leninist	Philip Fernandez	66	0.11	-0.01
Total valid votes		59,112	100.00	
Liberal hold		Swing	-2.1	

== See also ==
- List of animal rights advocates
