= George Ralph Richardson Cockburn =

Canadian politician

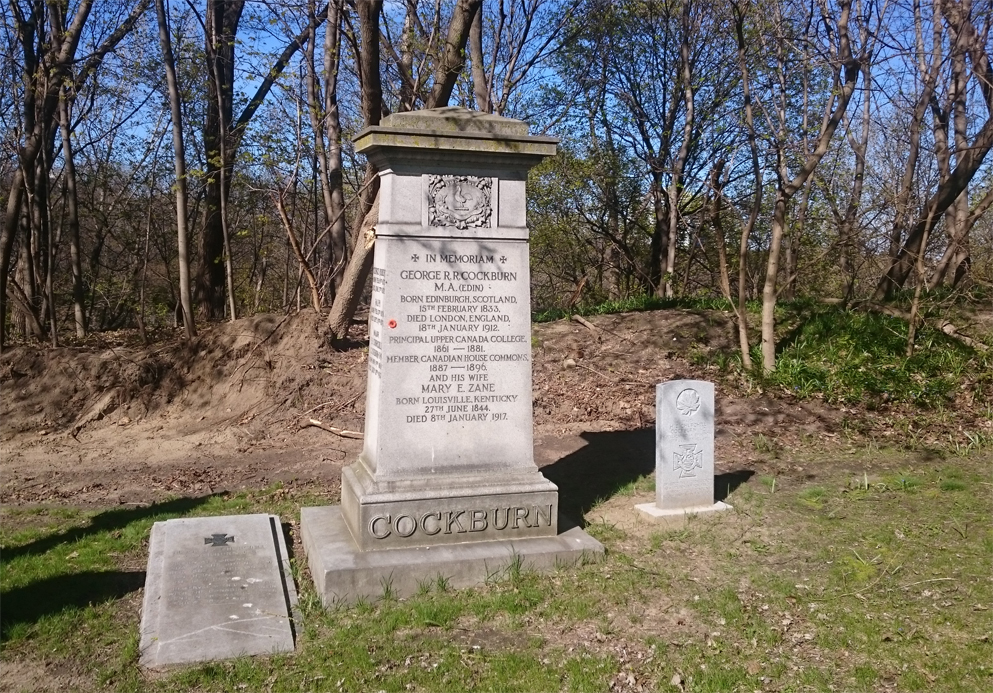

Member of the Canadian Parliament for Toronto Centre
- In office 1887–1896
- Preceded by: Robert Hay
- Succeeded by: William Lount

Personal details
- Born: 14 February 1834 Edinburgh, Scotland
- Died: 18 January 1912 (aged 77) Toronto, Ontario, Canada
- Party: Conservative
- Children: Hampden Cockburn (son)

George Ralph Richardson Cockburn (14 February 1834 – 18 January 1912) was a Scottish-born educator and political figure in Ontario, Canada. He represented Toronto Centre in the House of Commons of Canada from 1887 to 1896 as a Conservative member.

He was born in Edinburgh and was educated in Scotland, graduating from the University of Edinburgh and continuing his studies in Germany. Cockburn taught in Scotland for several years. In 1834, he married Mary Zane. In 1858, he came to Canada West as rector for the Model Grammar School for Upper Canada. Cockburn was named principal for Upper Canada College in 1861. Cockburn was unsuccessful when he ran for reelection in 1896. He was president of the Toronto Land and Investment Company and a director for the Ontario Bank, the London and Canadian Loan and Agency Company and the Glasgow and London Insurance Company. Cockburn also served as a member of the senate for the University of Toronto.
