= Robert Wilkes =

Canadian politician

Member of the Canadian Parliament for Toronto Centre
- In office 1872–1874
- Preceded by: District was created in 1872
- Succeeded by: John Macdonald

Personal details
- Born: June 24, 1832 Tullaghan, County Leitrim, Ireland
- Died: August 16, 1880 (aged 48) Sturgeon Point, Ontario
- Party: Liberal

Robert Wilkes (June 24, 1832 – August 16, 1880) was an Irish-Canadian politician and businessman. Born in Tullaghan, County Leitrim, Ireland, Wilkes came to Toronto from his native Ireland at sixteen, working as a clerk before buying a jewelry firm, Rossin Brothers, which he expanded into a cross-country operation. He later invested in railroads, and in 1871 he was appointed director of the Canadian Bank of Commerce.

In 1872 he was elected Member of Parliament for Toronto Centre, as a Liberal. The election was regarded by observers on both sides as rife with enmity, bribery and corruption. In 1874 he was re-elected, but the return was voided and he retired from politics.
