= George Hope Bertram =

Canadian businessman and politician

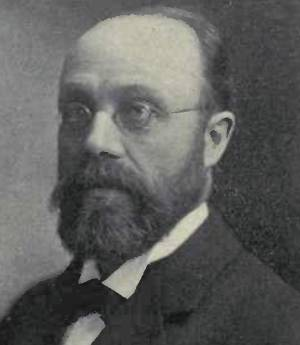

Member of the Canadian Parliament for Toronto Centre
- In office 1897–1900
- Preceded by: William Lount
- Succeeded by: William Rees Brock

Personal details
- Born: March 12, 1847 Fenton Barns, Scotland
- Died: March 20, 1900 (aged 53) Toronto, Ontario
- Party: Liberal
- Relations: John Bertram, brother

George Hope Bertram (March 12, 1847 – 20 March 1900) was a Canadian businessman and politician.

Born in Fenton Barns, Scotland to Hugh Bertram and Isabella Mack, Bertram emigrated to join his brother John in Canada in 1865. After opening a hardware store in Lindsay, Ontario, he moved to Toronto in 1876. A prominent businessman, Bertram was elected to federal parliament as a member of the House of Commons of Canada for Toronto Centre in an 1897 by-election. Bertram's daughter, Christine Mabel married William Henry Moore, a writer and lawyer who also became a Member of the Canadian House of Commons from Ontario. A Liberal, he died in office in 1900 and is buried in Mount Pleasant Cemetery, Toronto.

His brother John also served in the House of Commons.
