= Mark Warner (Canadian politician) =

Canadian politician

Personal details
- Born: 1964 (age 61–62) Trinidad and Tobago

Mark A. A. Warner (born 1964) is a Canadian international trade and competition (antitrust) lawyer. He was previously with the Toronto firm Fasken Martineau DuMoulin and with the Government of Ontario.

Warner was chosen in February 2007 as the Conservative Party of Canada's candidate for the House of Commons in the riding of Toronto Centre by-election, following the retirement of Bill Graham. On October 30, the national council of the party replaced him as its candidate because of differences between Warner's campaign and the national party's campaign over social and urban issues.

== Biography ==
Warner was born in Port of Spain, Trinidad and Tobago, and immigrated to Canada with his family in 1968. His early childhood home was in Halifax, Nova Scotia, where he attended the Halifax Grammar School before his family moved to North Bay and then Pickering, Ontario. Warner earned a BA (Joint Honours) in Economics and Political Science at McGill University in Montreal and an MA in economics from the University of Toronto before earning an LLB from Osgoode Hall Law School at York University and an LLM in International & Comparative Law from Georgetown University Law Centre. He is licensed to practise in Ontario, Canada and New York State, and was previously a Member of the Brussels Bar.

At McGill, Warner served on the university's senate and co-founded the Black Students Network. He was an activist in the anti-apartheid movement and campaigned successfully for McGill and the University of Toronto to divest holdings in companies doing business in apartheid-era South Africa. He was awarded McGill's Scarlet Key Society award in 1986 for his leadership of the South African divestment campaign at McGill.

He is the co-author of Canadian Law and Practice of International Trade (2nd edition, 1997) with Bill Graham, the retired MP for Toronto Centre, amongst others. Warner worked as legal counsel in the Trade Directorate of the Organisation for Economic Co-operation and Development's Trade Directorate in Paris from 1996 to 2000. Warner has practised law in Toronto, Washington, D.C., New York City and Brussels. Over the course of his career, he has taught competition and trade law courses at: the University of Leiden (Netherlands), the World Trade Institute (Switzerland), the International Institute for Management in Telecommunications (Switzerland), the University of Western Cape (South Africa), and the International Law Institute (Uganda). Prior to joining the Organisation for Economic Co-operation and Development (OECD), he was Assistant Professor and assistant director of the Centre for International & Comparative Law at the University of Baltimore School of Law teaching courses on corporate law and trade law. Warner has also been an arbitrator for ICANN domain name disputes, and his June 19, 2000 decision in QTrade financial group Canada, Inc. v. Bank of Hydro was the earliest arbitral finding of reverse domain hijacking. In 2009 and 2010, Warner coordinated the legal response of the Government of Ontario to the General Motors bankruptcy and Chrysler bankruptcy and the restructuring of their Ontario operations.

Warner regularly speaks publicly at events on, trade policy and competition policy and is invited to comment on current economic developments in news media such as the Financial Times, the Toronto Star, Agence France Press, the Wall Street Journal and the Dow Jones Newswire.

He lives in the Toronto neighbourhood of Cabbagetown and currently serves on the board of directors of the Cabbagetown Youth Centre. He has previously served on the board of directors of the Regent Park Community Health Centre.
