= Charles Henry (Canadian politician) =

Canadian politician

Member of Parliament for Rosedale
- In office June 1949 – June 1957
- Preceded by: Harry Jackman
- Succeeded by: David James Walker

Personal details
- Born: 5 July 1911 Toronto, Ontario
- Died: 4 June 1989 (aged 77)
- Party: Liberal
- Spouse(s): Geraldine O'Brien (m. 21 May 1942)
- Profession: barrister, lawyer

Charles Henry (5 July 1911 – 4 June 1989) was a Liberal party member of the House of Commons of Canada. He was born in Toronto, Ontario.

After studies for a Bachelor of Arts degree at St. Michael's College, he became a barrister and lawyer.

He was first elected at the Rosedale riding in the 1949 general election, defeating Tory incumbent Harry Jackman, and was then re-elected in 1953. Henry was defeated in the 1957 election by David James Walker of the Progressive Conservative party.
