= 1977 Canadian federal budget =

1977 Budget of the Canadian Federal Government
- Presented: 31 March 1977
- Country: Canada
- Parliament: 30th
- Party: Liberal
- Finance minister: Donald Stovel Macdonald
- Total revenue: 35.633 billion
- Total expenditures: 46.512 billion
- Deficit: $10.879 billion

The Canadian federal budget for fiscal year 1977–78 was presented by Minister of Finance Donald Stovel Macdonald in the House of Commons of Canada on 31 March 1977. The budget introduced wage and price controls in an attempt to control inflation. This policy had been a campaign proposal put forward by Robert Stanfield's Progressive Conservatives it the 1974 Canadian federal election, but was criticized by Pierre Trudeau at the time.
