= David James Walker =

Canadian politician (1905–1995)

The Honourable David James Walker PC QC
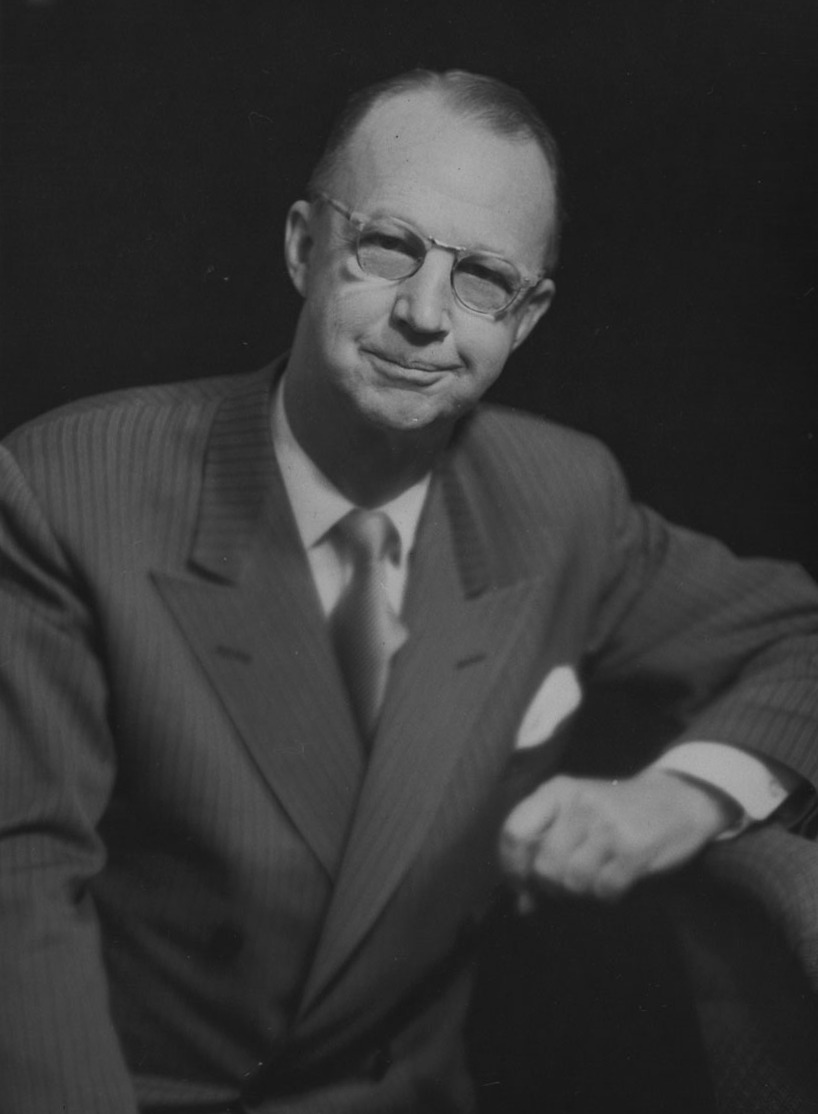
- Walker c.1950s

Minister of Public Works
- In office 20 August 1959 – 12 July 1962
- Prime Minister: John Diefenbaker
- Preceded by: Howard Charles Green
- Succeeded by: Howard Charles Green (acting)

Canadian Senator from Ontario
- In office 4 February 1963 – 30 September 1989
- Appointed by: John Diefenbaker

Member of Parliament for Rosedale
- In office 10 June 1957 – 17 June 1962
- Preceded by: Charles Henry
- Succeeded by: Donald Stovel Macdonald

Personal details
- Born: 10 May 1905 Toronto, Ontario, Canada
- Died: 28 November 1995 (aged 90)
- Party: Progressive Conservative

David James Walker PC QC (10 May 1905 – 28 November 1995) was a Canadian politician.

== Background ==
Born in Toronto, Ontario, he was educated at Jarvis Collegiate Institute, the University of Toronto and Osgoode Hall Law School. He was called to the Ontario Bar in 1931.

He was first elected to the House of Commons of Canada for the Toronto riding of Rosedale in the 1957 election after first losing the 1953 election. A Progressive Conservative, he was re-elected in 1958 but was defeated in 1962. From 1957 to 1958, he was the Parliamentary Assistant to the Minister of Justice and Attorney General. From 1959 to 1962, he was the Minister responsible for National Capital Commission, Minister responsible for Canada Mortgage and Housing Corporation, and Minister of Public Works in the cabinet of John Diefenbaker.

A long-time friend of John Diefenbaker, he was Best Man at Diefenbaker's second wedding to Olive Diefenbaker in 1953. As well, he nominated Diefenbaker for leadership at the 1942 Winnipeg Progressive Conservative leadership convention and was his campaign manager in 1948. In 1963, he was appointed to the Senate of Canada representing the senatorial division of Toronto. He resigned in 1989.

Walker opposed Pierre Elliott Trudeau's proposed Senate reforms in 1969.

He published his memoirs Fun Along the Way: Memoirs of Dave Walker in 1989.
