= John Macdonald (Canadian politician) =

Canadian merchant, churchman, philanthropist and politician

The Honourable John Macdonald
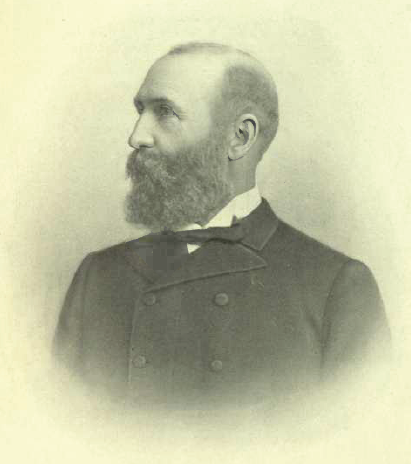

Canadian Senator from Ontario
- In office 1887–1890
- Appointed by: John A. Macdonald

Member of Parliament for Toronto Centre
- In office 1875–1878
- Preceded by: Robert Wilkes
- Succeeded by: Robert Hay

Personal details
- Born: December 27, 1824 Perth, Scotland
- Died: February 4, 1890 (aged 65) Toronto, Ontario, Canada
- Party: Independent Liberal
- Education: Dalhousie University

John Macdonald (December 27, 1824 – February 4, 1890) was a Canadian merchant, churchman, philanthropist, and politician in the late 19th century in Toronto. He was a major patron of YMCA and the Toronto General Hospital. In 1860, he built a mansion called 'Oaklands', which is now De La Salle College, a private co-educational school in the Deer Park area of mid-Toronto.

== Early life ==
Macdonald was born in Perth, Scotland and came to Upper Canada in 1837 when his father's regiment was transferred there. He studied at Dalhousie University and then Bay Street Academy in Toronto before entering business.

== Business career ==
After a few years working for others, Macdonald opened his own retail dry goods business in Toronto in September 1849. By 1853 he had moved to wholesaling and by the 1870s was taking in $1 million in sales each year.

== Political career ==
Macdonald represented West Toronto in the 8th Parliament of the Province of Canada from 1863, when he defeated John Beverley Robinson, until he himself was defeated in 1867. After Confederation, which he opposed, he served as an Independent Liberal Member of the House of Commons of Canada for the riding of Toronto Centre from 1875 to 1878. He was appointed to the Senate of Canada on the recommendation of Prime Minister John A. Macdonald on November 9, 1887. His term ended with his death in 1890.

== Death ==
Macdonald died in Toronto, on February 4, 1890. He is interred at his family's plot in the Toronto Necropolis Cemetery.

== Works ==
Building	Year Completed	Builder	Style	Source	Location	Image
Oaklands	1860	John Macdonald, design William Hay		8	De La Salle College	
