= Robert Hay (furniture manufacturer) =

Canadian politician

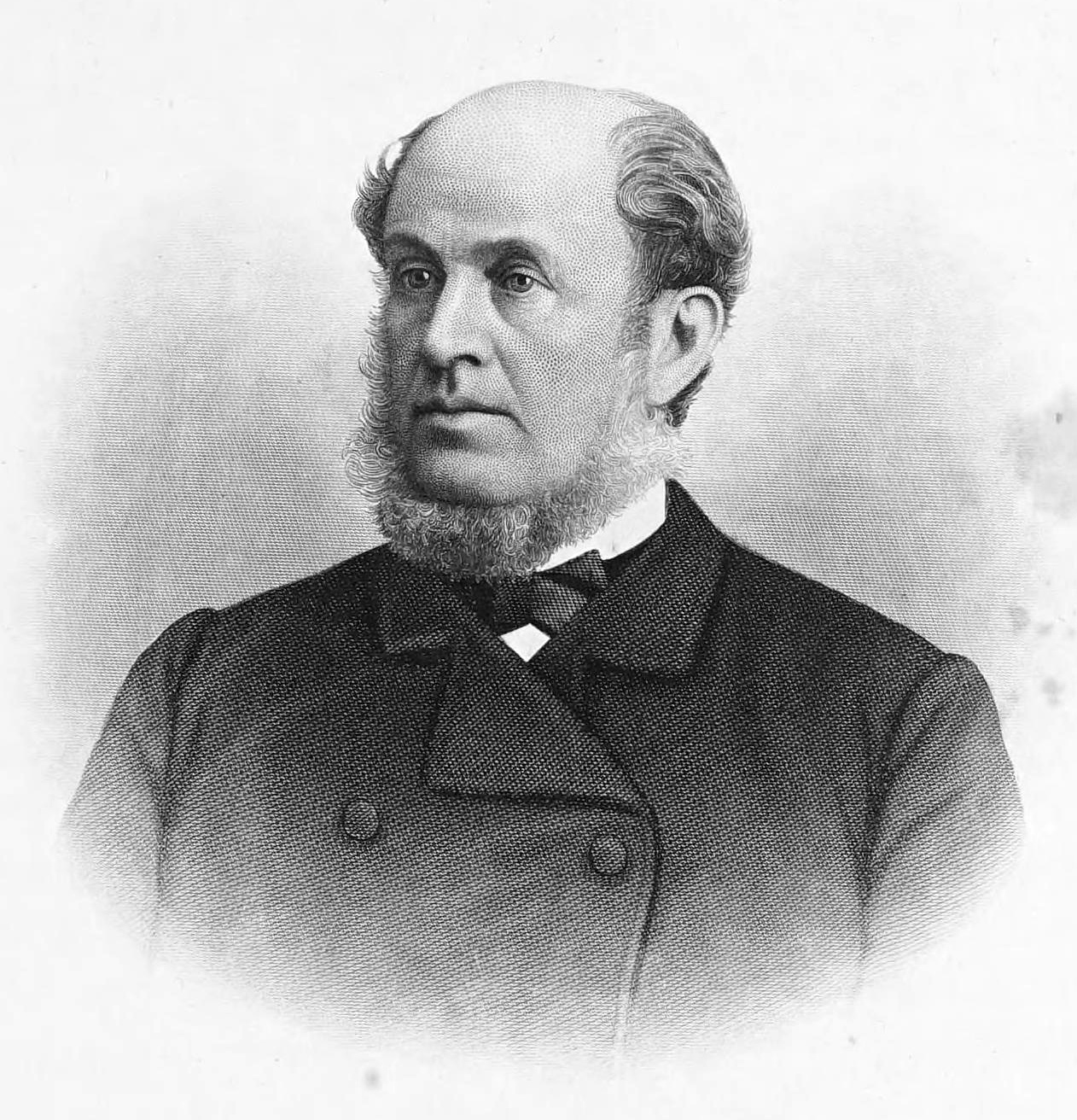
- Hay in an 1880 engraving

Member of the Canadian Parliament for Toronto Centre
- In office 1878–1887
- Preceded by: John Macdonald
- Succeeded by: George Cockburn

Personal details
- Born: May 18, 1808 Tippermuir, Perthshire, Scotland
- Died: July 24, 1890 (aged 82) Toronto, Ontario, Canada
- Party: Liberal

Robert Hay (May 18, 1808 – July 24, 1890) was a furniture manufacturer and political figure in Ontario, Canada. He represented Toronto Centre in the House of Commons of Canada as a Liberal member from 1878 to 1887.

He was born in Tibbermore, Perthshire, Scotland in 1890, the son of Robert Hay, and apprenticed as a cabinet-maker in Perth. In 1831, he came with his parents to York (later Toronto); his parents died of cholera shortly after arriving. In 1835, he became partners with John Jacques in a cabinet-making business. By 1850, their company was the leading manufacturer of furniture in the country. They soon adopted the use of steam-powered machinery. The company established a branch plant and sawmill in New Lowell in Simcoe County in 1854. Hay helped establish the Toronto, Simcoe and Lake Huron Union Railway which passed through New Lowell. The company also produced other wooden items, such as clothespins, and supplied timber for railway construction. Jacques retired from the business in 1870.

Hay also helped found the St Lawrence Bank in 1872, raised livestock near New Lowell in partnership with his nephew Robert Paton, was a director of the Credit Valley Railway and took part in land speculation in the North-West Territories. He married Mary Dunlop in 1847 and had eight children. The furniture business was dissolved in 1885.

He died in Toronto in 1890.
