= California State Christian University =

Unaccredited and unregulated school based in Los Angeles

California State Christian University is an unaccredited and unregulated school based in Los Angeles, California. Founded in 1972 by a Korean pastor, the school focuses on religious studies and programs.

Due to unregulated status of the institution and dubious programs, numerous changes to base locations in the last decade, it is considered as a diploma mill.

== Noted alumni ==
- Don Meredith, Canadian pastor and former Senator
