= William Rees Brock =

Canadian businessman and politician

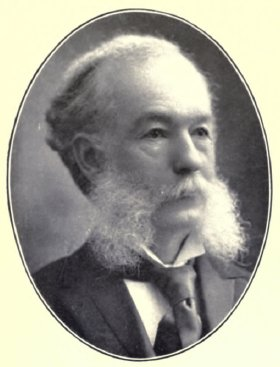

Member of the Canadian Parliament for Toronto Centre
- In office 1900–1904
- Preceded by: George Hope Bertram
- Succeeded by: Edward Frederick Clarke

Personal details
- Born: February 14, 1836 Eramosa Township, Upper Canada
- Died: November 1, 1917 (aged 81)
- Party: Conservative

William Rees Brock (February 14, 1836 – November 1, 1917) was a Canadian businessman and politician.

Born in Eramosa Township, Upper Canada, Brock was president of W. R. Brock Co., Limited which sold wholesale dry goods, woolens, and carpets. He was elected to the House of Commons of Canada in the 1900 federal election for the electoral district of Toronto Centre. A Conservative, he did not run in 1904.
