= Toronto Centre (federal electoral district) =

Federal electoral district in Ontario, Canada

Coordinates: 43.661°N 79.369°W

Ontario electoral district
- Interactive map of riding boundaries from the 2025 federal election

Federal electoral district
- Legislature: House of Commons
MP
Evan Solomon
Liberal
- District created: 1933
- First contested: 1935
- Last contested: 2025
- District webpage: profile, map

Demographics
- Population (2021): 119,901
- Electors (2020): 81,861
- Area (km²): 5.84
- Pop. density (per km²): 20,531
- Census division: Toronto
- Census subdivision: Toronto (part)

Toronto Centre (French: Toronto-Centre) is a federal electoral district in Toronto, Ontario, Canada, that has been represented in the House of Commons of Canada from 1872 to 1925, and since 1935, under the names Centre Toronto (1872–1903), Toronto Centre (1903–1925, and since 2004), Rosedale (1935–1997), and Toronto Centre—Rosedale (1997–2004).

Toronto Centre contains a large part of Downtown Toronto. The riding contains areas such as Regent Park (Canada's first social housing development), St. James Town (a largely immigrant area and the most densely populated neighbourhood in Canada), Cabbagetown, Church and Wellesley (a historic LGBTQ2 neighbourhood), Toronto Metropolitan University and part of the city's financial district (the east side of Yonge Street). At just under 6 square kilometres (2.3 mi^{2}), it is the smallest riding in Canada by area.

== History ==
Centre Toronto riding was first created in 1872 from portions of West Toronto and East Toronto. In 1903, the name was changed to Toronto Centre. In 1924, the riding was broken into Toronto East Centre, Toronto West Centre and Toronto South.

A riding covering much the same area was created in 1933 named "Rosedale" after the wealthy neighbourhood of Rosedale. This riding was replaced with "Toronto Centre—Rosedale" in 1996, but the quickly growing population resulted in large areas being shaved off on all sides. In 2003, Toronto Centre—Rosedale was abolished, and a new riding somewhat to the east was created named "Toronto Centre".

Each of the four major national political parties (the Liberal Party, the Conservative Party, the Green Party, and the NDP), have active federal and provincial riding associations which act as the local party organizations in the riding. Since the early 1990s, however, most contests have been between the Liberals and NDP.

This riding lost territory to University—Rosedale and Spadina—Fort York, and gained a small fraction of territory from Trinity—Spadina during the 2012 electoral redistribution. This made Toronto Centre the smallest size riding in the country, beating Papineau in Montreal by 4 km^{2}.

Historically, the riding was one of the few in central Toronto where the Progressive Conservatives usually did well. The PCs held the riding for 34 of the 58 years from 1935 to 1993. However, it has been in Liberal hands without interruption since 1993. The 2012 federal electoral redistribution shifted much of the wealthier northern part of the riding, which included Rosedale, to the new riding of University—Rosedale.

The riding was represented by former interim Liberal leader Bob Rae after the federal by-elections of March 17, 2008. Rae resigned from Parliament on July 31, 2013. Liberal Chrystia Freeland picked up the riding in the subsequent by-election, and held it until the 2015 Canadian federal election, when she chose to run for re-election in the new riding of University—Rosedale.

From 2015 to 2020, the riding was represented by Bill Morneau. On August 17, 2020, Morneau resigned as MP. Following a by-election on October 26, 2020, the riding has been represented by Marci Ien.

=== Former boundaries ===
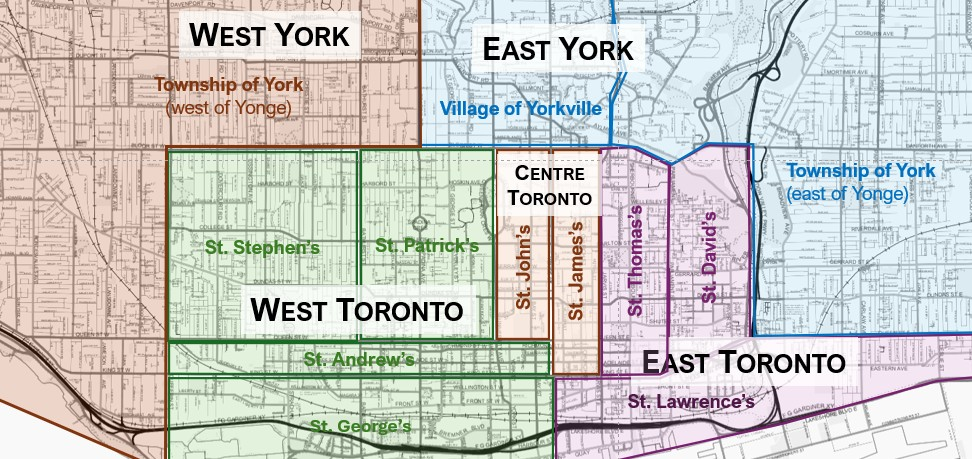
1872-1904

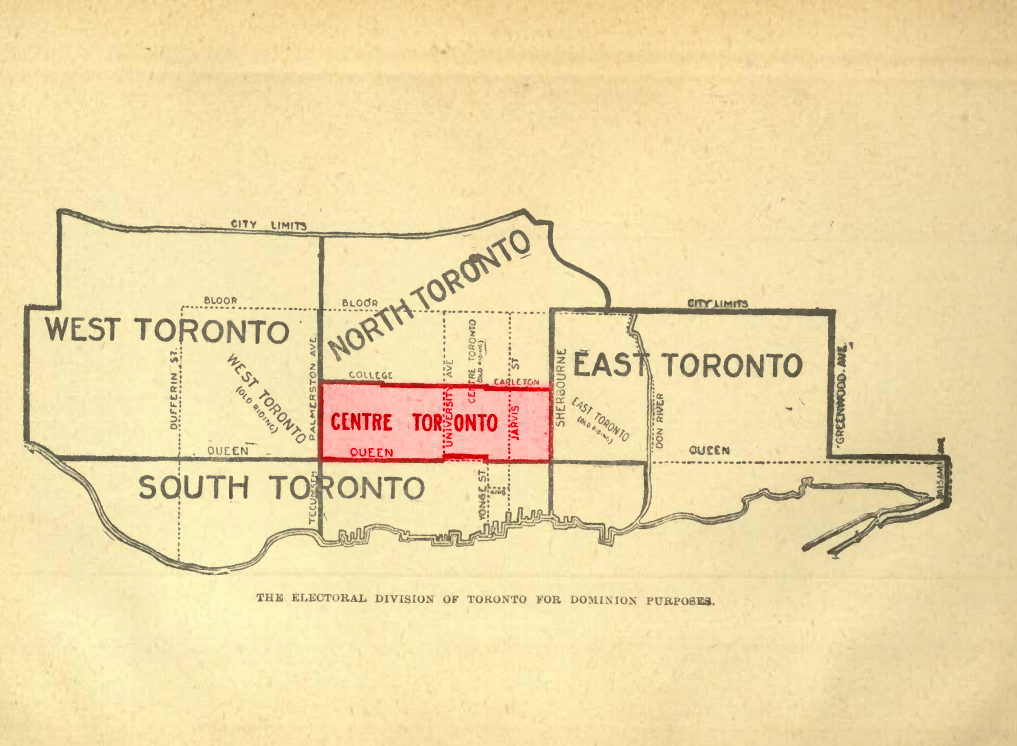
1904–1914

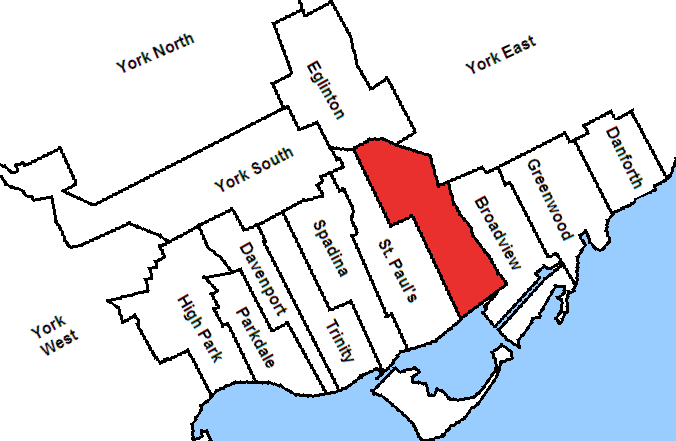
1933–1966

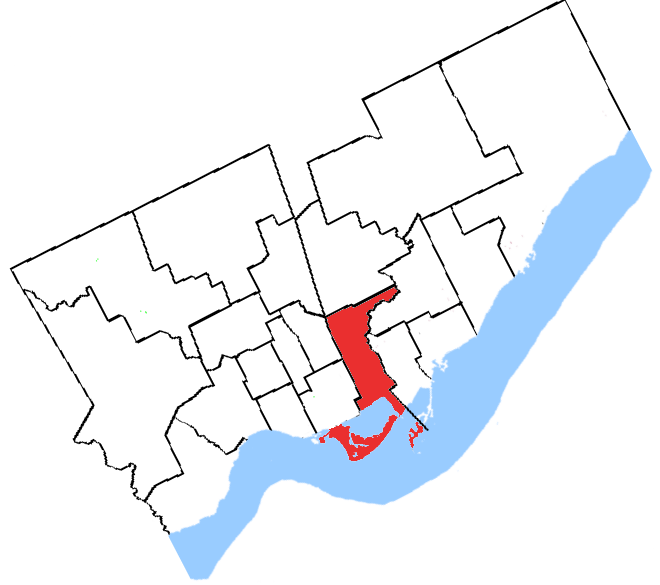
1966–1976

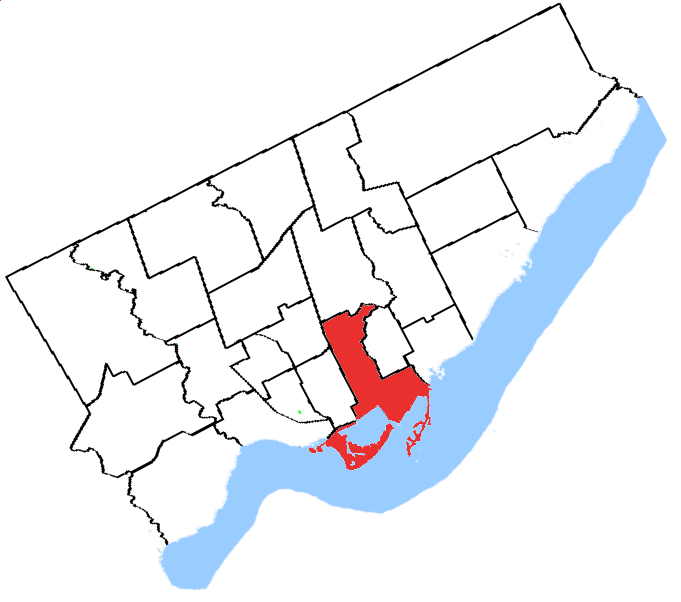
1976–1987

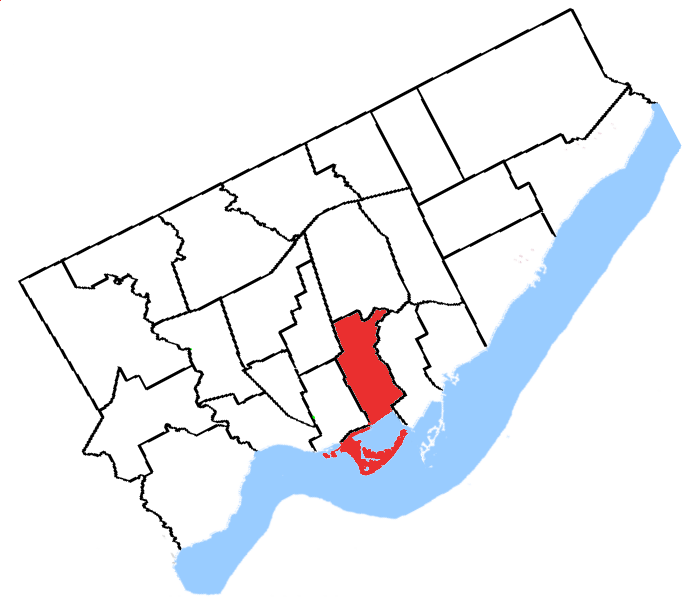
1987–1996

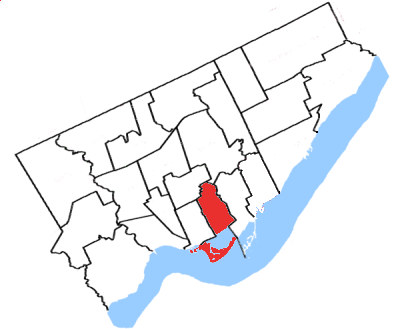
1996–2003

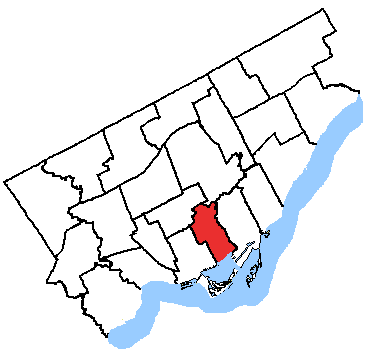
2003–2015

== Demographics ==
According to the 2021 Canadian census

Ethnic groups: 40.7% White, 13.8% South Asian, 12.3% Chinese, 10.3% Black, 5.0% Filipino, 3.3% Latin American, 2.4% Arab, 2.2% Korean, 2.2% Southeast Asian, 2.0% West Asian, 1.9% Indigenous
Languages: 51.2% English, 6.2% Mandarin, 3.0% Spanish, 2.7% Cantonese, 2.4% French, 2.3% Tagalog, 1.7% Arabic, 1.7% Korean, 1.6% Bengali, 1.4% Russian, 1.4% Hindi, 1.3% Portuguese, 1.2% Tamil, 1.1% Persian
Religions: 34.5% Christian (17.2% Catholic, 2.9% Christian Orthodox, 2.7% Anglican, 1.2% United Church, 10.5% Other), 10.2% Muslim, 6.1% Hindu, 1.9% Buddhist, 1.7% Jewish, 44.0% None
Median income: $40,800 (2020)
Average income: $59,750 (2020)

== Electoral district associations ==
Canadian political parties are locally represented by Electoral district associations (EDA). Elections Canada officially recognizes the following Toronto Centre EDAs:

Party	Association name	President	HQ city
Conservative	Toronto Centre Conservative Association	Joseph A. Cadeau	Toronto
Green	Toronto Centre Green Party Association	Lyndsey A. Lewis	Toronto
Liberal	Toronto Centre Federal Liberal Association	Steven Williams	Toronto
New Democratic	Toronto Centre Federal NDP Riding Association	Jeff Slater	Toronto

== Members of Parliament ==
These ridings have elected the following members of Parliament:

Parliament	Years	Member	Party
Centre Toronto; Riding created from West Toronto and East Toronto
2nd	1872–1874	Robert Wilkes	Liberal
3rd	1874–1875	Robert Wilkes	Liberal
3rd	1875–1878	John Macdonald	Independent Liberal
4th	1878–1882	Robert Hay	Liberal
5th	1882–1887	Robert Hay	Liberal
6th	1887–1891	George Ralph Richardson Cockburn	Conservative
7th	1891–1896	George Ralph Richardson Cockburn	Conservative
8th	1896–1897	William Lount	Liberal
8th	1897–1900	George Hope Bertram	Liberal
9th	1900–1904	William Rees Brock	Conservative
Toronto Centre
10th	1904–1905	Edward Frederick Clarke	Conservative
10th	1905–1908	Edmund James Bristol	Conservative
11th	1908–1911	Edmund James Bristol	Conservative
12th	1911–1917	Edmund James Bristol	Conservative
13th	1917–1921	Edmund James Bristol	Government (Unionist)
14th	1921–1925	Edmund James Bristol	Conservative
Riding dissolved into Toronto East Centre, Toronto West Centre and Toronto South
Rosedale; Riding re-created from Toronto East Centre, Toronto Northeast
18th	1935–1940	Harry Gladstone Clarke	Conservative
19th	1940–1945	Harry Jackman	National Government
20th	1945–1949	Harry Jackman	Progressive Conservative
21st	1949–1953	Charles Henry	Liberal
22nd	1953–1957	Charles Henry	Liberal
23rd	1957–1958	David James Walker	Progressive Conservative
24th	1958–1962	David James Walker	Progressive Conservative
25th	1962–1963	Donald Stovel Macdonald	Liberal
26th	1963–1965	Donald Stovel Macdonald	Liberal
27th	1965–1968	Donald Stovel Macdonald	Liberal
28th	1968–1972	Donald Stovel Macdonald	Liberal
29th	1972–1974	Donald Stovel Macdonald	Liberal
30th	1974–1978	Donald Stovel Macdonald	Liberal
30th	1978–1979	David Crombie	Progressive Conservative
31st	1979–1980	David Crombie	Progressive Conservative
32nd	1980–1984	David Crombie	Progressive Conservative
33rd	1984–1988	David Crombie	Progressive Conservative
34th	1988–1993	David MacDonald	Progressive Conservative
35th	1993–1997	Bill Graham	Liberal
Toronto Centre—Rosedale
36th	1997–2000	Bill Graham	Liberal
37th	2000–2004	Bill Graham	Liberal
Toronto Centre
38th	2004–2006	Bill Graham	Liberal
39th	2006–2007	Bill Graham	Liberal
39th	2008–2008	Bob Rae	Liberal
40th	2008–2011	Bob Rae	Liberal
41st	2011–2013	Bob Rae	Liberal
41st	2013–2015	Chrystia Freeland	Liberal
42nd	2015–2019	Bill Morneau	Liberal
43rd	2019–2020	Bill Morneau	Liberal
43rd	2020–2021	Marci Ien	Liberal
44th	2021–2025	Marci Ien	Liberal
45th	2025–present	Evan Solomon	Liberal

== Election results ==
=== Toronto Centre, 2004–present ===
Graph of election results in Toronto Centre (since 2003; minor parties that never got 2% of the vote or did not run consistently are omitted) View source data.

2025 Canadian federal election
Party	Candidate	Votes	%	±%	Expenditures
Liberal	Evan Solomon	37,907	64.33	+14.47	
Conservative	Luis Ibarra	12,321	20.91	+7.97	
New Democratic	Samantha Green	7,358	12.49	–13.75	
Green	Olivia Iheme	664	1.13	–6.95	
People's	Nathen Mazri	235	0.40	–1.95	
Animal Protection	Simon Luisi	177	0.30	N/A	
Marxist–Leninist	Philip Fernandez	170	0.29	N/A	
Independent	Cleveland Marshall	90	0.15	N/A	
Total valid votes/expense limit		58,922	100.00		
Total rejected ballots		436			
Turnout		59,358	63.92		
Eligible voters		92,863			
Liberal notional hold		Swing		+9.92	
Source: Elections Canada

^ Change is from 2021 redistributed results.

2021 federal election redistributed results
Party	Vote	%
Liberal	23,683	49.83
New Democratic	12,474	26.25
Conservative	6,143	12.93
Green	3,826	8.05
People's	1,116	2.35
Others	281	0.59

2021 Canadian federal election
Party	Candidate	Votes	%	±%	Expenditures
Liberal	Marci Ien	23,071	50.35	+8.35	$108,727.70
New Democratic	Brian Chang	11,909	25.99	+8.99	$58,981.25
Conservative	Ryan Lester	5,571	12.16	+6.46	$10,494.07
Green	Annamie Paul	3,921	8.56	–24.14	$93,340.55
People's	Syed Jaffrey	1,047	2.29	–1.19	$0.00
Communist	Ivan Byard	181	0.40	–	$0.00
Animal Protection	Peter Stubbins	117	0.25	–	$4,744.99
Total valid votes/expense limit		45,817	100.00	–	$110,776.83
Total rejected ballots		366	0.79	+0.29	
Turnout		46,183	57.42	+26.52	
Eligible voters		80,430			
Liberal hold		Swing		–0.32	
Source: Elections Canada

Canadian federal by-election, October 26, 2020 Resignation of Bill Morneau
Party	Candidate	Votes	%	±%	Expenditures
Liberal	Marci Ien	10,581	42.0	-15.4	$116,839
Green	Annamie Paul	8,250	32.7	+25.6	$100,008
New Democratic	Brian Chang	4,280	17.0	-5.3	$71,222
Conservative	Benjamin Gauri Sharma	1,435	5.7	-6.4	$0
People's	Baljit Bawa	269	1.1	–	$22,752
Libertarian	Keith Komar	135	0.5	–	
Independent	Kevin Clarke	123	0.5	–	
Free	Dwayne Cappelletti	76	0.3	–	$1,570
No affiliation	Above Znoneofthe	56	0.2	–	$0
Total valid votes		25,205	100.0	–	
Total rejected ballots		118	0.5	-0.2	
Turnout		25,323	30.9	-35.2	
Electors on lists		81,861			
Liberal hold		Swing		-20.5	
Elections Canada

2019 Canadian federal election
Party	Candidate	Votes	%	±%	Expenditures
Liberal	Bill Morneau	31,271	57.37	−0.53	$95,538.84
New Democratic	Brian Chang	12,142	22.27	−4.34	$58,656.81
Conservative	Ryan Lester	6,613	12.13	−0.06	$39,309.94
Green	Annamie Paul	3,852	7.07	+4.47	$34,903.20
Animal Protection	Rob Lewin	182	0.33	–	$2,171.71
Rhinoceros	Sean Carson	147	0.27	–	–
Independent	Jason Tavares	126	0.23	–	–
Communist	Bronwyn Cragg	125	0.23	−0.03	$626.58
Marxist–Leninist	Philip Fernandez	54	0.10	−0.05	–
Total valid votes/expense limit		54,512	99.30	–	$107,308.65
Total rejected ballots		384	0.70	+0.18	
Turnout		54,896	66.08	−3.27	
Eligible voters		83,076			
Liberal hold		Swing		+1.90	
Source: Elections Canada

2015 Canadian federal election
Party	Candidate	Votes	%	±%	Expenditures
Liberal	Bill Morneau	29,297	57.90	+18.48	$170,325.26
New Democratic	Linda McQuaig	13,467	26.61	-9.58	$198,294.34
Conservative	Julian Di Battista	6,167	12.19	-5.74	$22,625.73
Green	Colin Biggin	1,315	2.60	-2.56	$3,964.97
Independent	Jordan Stone	147	0.29	–	–
Communist	Mariam Ahmad	133	0.26	–	–
Marxist–Leninist	Philip Fernandez	76	0.15	–	–
Total valid votes/Expense limit		50,602	99.48		$203,952.21
Total rejected ballots		266	0.52	–	
Turnout		50,868	69.35	–	
Eligible voters		73,351			
Source: Elections Canada
Liberal notional hold		Swing		+14.03	

^ Change is from 2011 redistributed results.

2011 federal election redistributed results
Party	Vote	%
Liberal	14,828	39.42
New Democratic	13,617	36.20
Conservative	6,746	17.93
Green	1,942	5.16
Others	487	1.29

Canadian federal by-election, November 25, 2013 Resignation of Bob Rae (July 31, 2013)
Party	Candidate	Votes	%	±%	Expenditures
Liberal	Chrystia Freeland	17,194	49.38	+8.37	$ 97,609.64
New Democratic	Linda McQuaig	12,640	36.30	+6.09	99,230.30
Conservative	Geoff Pollock	3,004	8.63	−14.01	75,557.39
Green	John Deverell	1,034	2.97	−2.05	21,521.10
Progressive Canadian	Dorian Baxter	453	1.30		–
Libertarian	Judi Falardeau	236	0.68	+0.18	–
Independent	Kevin Clarke	84	0.24		560.00
Independent	John "The Engineer" Turmel	56	0.16		–
Independent	Leslie Bory	51	0.15		633.30
Online	Michael Nicula	43	0.12		200.00
Independent	Bahman Yazdanfar	26	0.07	−0.12	1,134.60
Total valid votes/expense limit		34,821	99.49	–	$ 101,793.06
Total rejected ballots		177	0.51	+0.12	
Turnout		34,998	37.72	−25.21	
Eligible voters		92,780			
Liberal hold		Swing		+1.14	
Source(s) "November 25, 2013 By-elections Poll-by-poll results". Elections Canada. "November 25, 2013 By-election – Financial Reports".

2011 Canadian federal election
Party	Candidate	Votes	%	±%	Expenditures
Liberal	Bob Rae	22,832	41.01	-12.51	$ 51,672.12
New Democratic	Susan Wallace	16,818	30.21	+15.12	18,904.44
Conservative	Kevin Moore	12,604	22.64	+4.32	63,141.66
Green	Ellen Michelson	2,796	5.02	-6.83	44,006.84
Libertarian	Judi Falardeau	277	0.50		–
Communist	Cathy Holliday	159	0.29	-0.09	502.10
Independent	Bahman Yazdanfar	108	0.19		653.91
Marxist–Leninist	Philip Fernandez	76	0.14	-0.04	–
Total valid votes/Expense limit/Total expenditures		55,670	99.61	$ 92,663.68	$ 178,881.07
Total rejected ballots		220	0.39	-0.10	
Turnout		55,890	62.93	+5.54	
Eligible voters		88,810			
Liberal hold		Swing		-13.82	

==== 2008 ====
===== General election =====
On September 21, 2008, Conservative candidate Chris Reid resigned because he said he couldn't commit to four years in government. However, blog entries were discovered that linked him to controversial musings on guns and the murder of Tim McLean aboard a Greyhound bus. Chris Reid was replaced by David Gentili as the Conservative candidate for Toronto Centre. Expenditures listed for Gentili include expenditures reported by Reid.

2008 Canadian federal election
Party	Candidate	Votes	%	±%	Expenditures
Liberal	Bob Rae	27,462	53.53	-5.94	$ 48,353.21
Conservative	David Gentili	9,402	18.33	+6.01	39,290.89
New Democratic	El-Farouk Khaki	7,743	15.09	+1.21	21,305.27
Green	Ellen Michelson	6,081	11.85	-1.56	23,041.16
Communist	Johan Boyden	193	0.38		432.31
Animal Alliance	Liz White	187	0.36	-0.15	685.91
Independent	Gerald Derome	146	0.28		2,063.60
Marxist–Leninist	Philip Fernandez	92	0.18		–
Total valid votes/Expense limit/Total Expenditures		51,306	99.50	$ 92,067.97	$ 135,172.35
Total rejected ballots		257	0.50	+0.10	
Turnout		51,563	57.39	+29.52	
Liberal hold		Swing		-5.97	

===== By-election =====
A by-election, held on March 17, 2008, to fill a vacancy created by the resignation of Bill Graham was won by Liberal Bob Rae, a former Ontario NDP Premier.

The nominated Conservative candidate in the by-election, Mark Warner, was dropped by the party's national council on October 31, 2007. Don Meredith was nominated as the Conservative candidate in December 2007.

Activist El-Farouk Khaki ran for the NDP and Chris Tindal was the Green Party of Canada candidate. Liz White was the Animal Alliance Environmental Voters Party of Canada candidate, and Doug Plumb represented the Canadian Action Party.

By-election on March 17, 2008 On Bill Graham's resignation, July 2, 2007
Party	Candidate	Votes	%	±%
Liberal	Bob Rae	14,187	59.47	+7.24
New Democratic	El-Farouk Khaki	3,312	13.88	-9.86
Green	Chris Tindal	3,199	13.41	+8.20
Conservative	Donald Meredith	2,939	12.32	-5.89
Animal Alliance	Liz White	123	0.52	+0.40
Canadian Action	Doug Plumb	97	0.41	
Total valid votes		23,857	99.60	
Total rejected ballots		96	0.40	
Turnout		23,953	27.86	
Liberal hold		Swing	+8.5	

2006 Canadian federal election
Party	Candidate	Votes	%	±%
Liberal	Bill Graham	30,874	52.23	-4.30
New Democratic	Michael Shapcott	14,036	23.74	-0.01
Conservative	Lewis Reford	10,763	18.21	+3.42
Green	Chris Tindal	3,080	5.21	+1.30
Communist	Johan Boyden	120	0.2	-0.05
Independent	Michel Prairie	101	0.2	
Animal Alliance	Liz White	72	0.12	
Marxist–Leninist	Philip Fernandez	66	0.11	-0.01
Total valid votes		59,112	100.00	
Liberal hold		Swing	-2.1	

2004 Canadian federal election
Party	Candidate	Votes	%	±%
Liberal	Bill Graham	30,336	56.53	+1.26
New Democratic	Michael Shapcott	12,747	23.75	+12.39
Conservative	Megan Harris	7,936	14.79	−13.00
Green	Gabriel Draven	2,097	3.91	
Marijuana	Jay Wagner	313	0.58	−0.94
Communist	Dan Goldstick	106	0.20	−0.05
Marxist–Leninist	Philip Fernandez	65	0.12	−0.12
Canadian Action	Kevin Peck	63	0.12	−2.97
Total valid votes		53,663	100.00	
Conservative vote is compared to the total of the Canadian Alliance vote and Progressive Conservative vote in 2000 election.

=== Toronto Centre—Rosedale, 1996–2003 ===
Graph of general election results in Toronto Centre—Rosedale (1996–2003, minor parties that never got 2% of the vote or didn't run consistently are omitted) View source data.

2000 Canadian federal election: Toronto Centre—Rosedale
Party	Candidate	Votes	%	±%
Liberal	Bill Graham	26,203	55.33	+6.08
Progressive Conservative	Randall Pearce	8,149	17.21	-2.13
New Democratic	David Berlin	5,300	11.19	-9.22
Alliance	Richard Walker	5,058	10.68	+2.83
Canadian Action	Paul Hellyer	1,466	3.10	+2.44
Marijuana	Neev Tapiero	722	1.52	
Natural Law	David Gordon	224	0.47	-0.11
Communist	Dan Goldstick	121	0.26	
Marxist–Leninist	Philip Fernandez	116	0.24	-0.11
Total valid votes		47,359	100.00	
Total rejected ballots		246	0.52	−0.38
Turnout		47,605	57.19	−9.82
Electors on the lists		83,243		
Sources: Official Results, Elections Canada, Poll-by-poll Result Files, Elections Canada, and Financial Returns, Elections Canada.

1997 Canadian federal election
Party	Candidate	Votes	%	±%
Liberal	Bill Graham	22,945	49.19	-0.80
New Democratic	David MacDonald	9,597	20.58	+9.80
Progressive Conservative	Stephen Probyn	8,993	19.28	-1.96
Reform	John Stewart	3,646	7.82	-4.65
Green	Jim Harris	577	1.24	+0.30
Canadian Action	Anthony Robert Pedrette	303	0.65	
Natural Law	Ron Parker	270	0.58	-1.01
Marxist–Leninist	Steve Rutchinski	166	0.36	+0.25
Independent	Ted W. Culp	145	0.31	
Total valid votes		46,642	100.00	

=== Rosedale, 1933–1996 ===
Graph of general election results in Rosedale (1933–1996, minor parties that never got 2% of the vote or didn't run consistently are omitted) View source data.

1993 Canadian federal election
Party	Candidate	Votes	%	±%
Liberal	Bill Graham	25,726	50.00	+8.78
Progressive Conservative	David MacDonald	10,930	21.24	-20.12
Reform	Daniel Jovkovic	6,413	12.46	
New Democratic	Jack Layton	5,547	10.78	-4.28
National	Martin Lanigan	1,091	2.12	
Natural Law	Doug Henning	817	1.59	
Green	Leslie Hunter	483	0.94	+0.22
Independent	Linda Dale Gibbons	350	0.68	
Marxist–Leninist	Steve Rutchinski	57	0.11	
Abolitionist	Yann Patrice D'Audibert Garcien	40	0.08	
Total valid votes		51,454	100.00	

1988 Canadian federal election
Party	Candidate	Votes	%	±%
Progressive Conservative	David MacDonald	22,704	41.36	-11.44
Liberal	Bill Graham	22,624	41.21	+15.08
New Democratic	Doug Wilson	8,266	15.06	-2.77
Libertarian	Chris Blatchly	411	0.75	+0.09
Green	Frank de Jong	397	0.72	-1.15
Rhinoceros	Liane McLarty	265	0.48	
Independent	Mike Constable	102	0.19	
Independent	Harry Margel	91	0.17	
Commonwealth of Canada	Paul Therrien	33	0.06	-0.27
Total valid votes		54,893	100.00	

1984 Canadian federal election
Party	Candidate	Votes	%	±%
Progressive Conservative	David Crombie	23,211	52.80	+8.84
Liberal	Bill Graham	11,488	26.13	-12.95
New Democratic	Dell Wolfson	7,836	17.82	+2.97
Green	Shirley Ruth Farlinger	821	1.87	
Libertarian	Clarke Slemon	291	0.66	+0.30
Communist	Sylvie Baillargeon	172	0.39	+0.17
Commonwealth of Canada	David Dube	144	0.33	
Total valid votes		43,963	100.00	

1980 Canadian federal election
Party	Candidate	Votes	%	±%
Progressive Conservative	David Crombie	16,862	43.96	-3.30
Liberal	Anne Cools	14,993	39.08	+6.07
New Democratic	Jim Hockley	5,698	14.85	-2.69
Rhinoceros	Geoff Yates	319	0.83	
Libertarian	Harry J. Nelson	140	0.36	-0.42
Independent	Frank Sommers	125	0.33	
Independent	Ann Ladas	104	0.27	-0.18
Communist	Dan Goldstick	85	0.22	+0.02
Marxist–Leninist	Alan Miller	34	0.09	+0.01
Total valid votes		38,360	100.00	

1979 Canadian federal election
Party	Candidate	Votes	%	±%
Progressive Conservative	David Crombie	18,594	47.26	-10.69
Liberal	Anne Cools	12,987	33.01	+1.72
New Democratic	Ron B. Thomson	6,902	17.54	+8.24
Libertarian	Alex W. Eaglesham	305	0.78	
Independent	Hans Blumenfeld	196	0.50	
Independent	Ann Ladas	176	0.45	
Communist	Dan Goldstick	80	0.20	-0.17
Independent	Joanne Pritchard	49	0.12	
Marxist–Leninist	Alan Miller	32	0.08	
Independent	Sean Howes	27	0.07	–
Total valid votes		39,348	100.00	

By-election on October 16, 1978
Party	Candidate	Votes	%	±%
Progressive Conservative	David Crombie	18,732	57.95	+17.68
Liberal	John Robert Evans	10,114	31.29	-17.84
New Democratic	Ron B. Thomson	3,008	9.31	-0.06
Independent	Donald M. Campbell	196	0.61	
Independent	Linda Cain	155	0.48	
Communist	Dan Goldstick	120	0.37	-0.02
Total valid votes		32,325	100.00	

1974 Canadian federal election
Party	Candidate	Votes	%	±%
Liberal	Donald Stovel Macdonald	17,227	49.13	+5.11
Progressive Conservative	Hal Jackman	14,119	40.27	-0.42
New Democratic	Maurice Desjardins	3,285	9.37	-3.22
Independent	Marshall Bruce Evoy	220	0.63	
Communist	Dan Goldstick	136	0.39	
Marxist–Leninist	Vern Harper	75	0.21	
Total valid votes		35,062	100.00	

1972 Canadian federal election
Party	Candidate	Votes	%	±%
Liberal	Donald Stovel Macdonald	16,073	44.02	-13.40
Progressive Conservative	Warren Beamish	14,856	40.69	+11.44
New Democratic	Ron Sabourin	4,598	12.59	+0.26
Independent	Aline Gregory	892	2.44	
Independent	David Starbuck	95	0.26	
Total valid votes		36,514	100.00	

1968 Canadian federal election
Party	Candidate	Votes	%	±%
Liberal	Donald Stovel Macdonald	19,011	57.42	+12.58
Progressive Conservative	Bob Bradley	9,683	29.25	-5.16
New Democratic	John Chamard	4,083	12.33	-8.41
Communist	F. Nelson Clarke	183	0.55	
Independent	Fred Reiner (New Canada Party)	148	0.45	
Total valid votes		33,108	100.00	

==== 1933–1965 ====
1965 Canadian federal election
Party	Candidate	Votes	%	±%
Liberal	Donald Stovel Macdonald	9,757	44.84	-10.03
Progressive Conservative	Hal Jackman	7,487	34.41	+5.38
New Democratic	Harding E. Bishop	4,514	20.75	+5.67
Total valid votes		21,758	100.00	

1963 Canadian federal election
Party	Candidate	Votes	%	±%
Liberal	Donald Stovel Macdonald	12,860	54.87	+12.06
Progressive Conservative	Hal Jackman	6,803	29.03	-11.28
New Democratic	Harding E. Bishop	3,534	15.08	-0.79
Social Credit	George Leslie	240	1.02	+0.01
Total valid votes		23,437	100.00	

1962 Canadian federal election
Party	Candidate	Votes	%	±%
Liberal	Donald Stovel Macdonald	10,191	42.81	+16.54
Progressive Conservative	David J. Walker	9,597	40.31	-22.89
New Democratic	Desmond Sparham	3,778	15.87	+5.34
Social Credit	John David Brunne	240	1.01	
Total valid votes		23,806	100.00	

Note: NDP vote is compared to CCF vote in 1958 election.

1958 Canadian federal election
Party	Candidate	Votes	%	±%
Progressive Conservative	David J. Walker	15,429	63.21	+8.93
Liberal	Tom O'Neill	6,412	26.27	-4.87
Co-operative Commonwealth	Tom McAulay	2,570	10.53	-2.75
Total valid votes		24,411	100.00	

1957 Canadian federal election
Party	Candidate	Votes	%	±%
Progressive Conservative	David J. Walker	12,415	54.28	+14.57
Liberal	Charles Henry	7,122	31.14	-10.06
Co-operative Commonwealth	Tom McAulay	3,038	13.28	-4.36
Social Credit	Harvey Jamieson	299	1.31	
Total valid votes		22,874	100.00	

1953 Canadian federal election
Party	Candidate	Votes	%	±%
Liberal	Charles Henry	8,702	41.20	+1.35
Progressive Conservative	David J. Walker	8,386	39.70	+2.23
Co-operative Commonwealth	Dudley Bristow	3,727	17.64	-5.04
Labor–Progressive	Janet M. Clark	308	1.46	
Total valid votes		21,123	100.00	

1949 Canadian federal election
Party	Candidate	Votes	%	±%
Liberal	Charles Henry	10,835	39.84	+10.85
Progressive Conservative	Harry Jackman	10,189	37.47	-11.37
Co-operative Commonwealth	Dudley Bristow	6,170	22.69	+4.69
Total valid votes		27,194	100.00	

Note: Progressive Conservative vote is compared to "National Government" vote in 1945 election.

1945 Canadian federal election
Party	Candidate	Votes	%	±%
Progressive Conservative	Harry Jackman	11,784	48.84	+3.38
Liberal	William Kearns	6,997	29.00	-20.80
Co-operative Commonwealth	David Cass-Beggs	4,342	17.99	+13.25
Labor–Progressive	John Weir	1,006	4.17	
Total valid votes		24,129	100.00	

Note: Progressive Conservative vote is compared to "National Government" vote in 1940 election.

1940 Canadian federal election
Party	Candidate	Votes	%	±%
National Government	Harry Jackman	12,519	52.36	+12.1
Liberal	J. Louis Shannon	10,399	43.49	+8.25
Co-operative Commonwealth	Norah Dymond	991	4.14	-5.52
Total valid votes		23,909	100.00	

Note: "National Government" vote is compared to Conservative vote in 1935 election.

1935 Canadian federal election
Party	Candidate	Votes	%	±%
Conservative	Harry Clarke	9,491	40.26	-13.62
Liberal	George Alexander Urquhart	8,306	35.24	-10.88
Co-operative Commonwealth	William Dennison	2,765	11.73	
Reconstruction	Bert Watts	2,277	9.66	
Communist	Samuel Scarlett	733	3.11	
Total valid votes		23,572	100.00	

=== Toronto Centre, 1903–1924 ===
Graph of general election results in Toronto Centre (1904–1925, minor parties that never got 2% of the vote or didn't run consistently are omitted) View source data.

1921 Canadian federal election
Party	Candidate	Votes	%	±%
Conservative	Edmund Bristol	5,985	53.88	-20.57
Liberal	Norman McEachren	5,123	46.12	+21.91
Total valid votes		11,108	100.00	

Note: Conservative vote is compared to Unionist vote in 1917 election.

1917 Canadian federal election
Party	Candidate	Votes	%	±%
Government (Unionist)	Edmund Bristol	12,051	74.45	+11.19
Opposition (Laurier Liberals)	J. George Ramsden	3,918	24.21	-12.53
Unknown	Archie Dramin	217	1.34	
Total valid votes		16,186	100.00	

Note: Unionist vote is compared to Liberal-Conservative vote in 1911 election.

1911 Canadian federal election
Party	Candidate	Votes	%	±%
Conservative	Edmund Bristol	5,156	63.26	+11.88
Liberal	Charles MacGuire	2,994	36.74	-11.88
Total valid votes		8,150	100.00	

1908 Canadian federal election
Party	Candidate	Votes	%	±%
Conservative	Edmund Bristol	3,482	51.38	-0.96
Liberal	T.C. Robinette	3,295	48.62	0.96
Total valid votes		6,777	100.00	

Note: vote compared to 1904 election.

By-election on April 11, 1905
Party	Candidate	Votes
Conservative	Edmund Bristol	acc.

1904 Canadian federal election
Party	Candidate	Votes	%	±%
Conservative	E.F. Clarke	4,321	52.34	+2.00
Liberal	T.C. Robinette	3,935	47.66	+1.43
Total valid votes		8,256	100.00	

=== Centre Toronto, 1872–1903 ===
Graph of general election results in Centre Toronto (1872-1900, minor parties that never got 2% of the vote or didn't run consistently are omitted) View source data.

1900 Canadian federal election
Party	Candidate	Votes	%	±%
Conservative	William Rees Brock	2,625	50.34	+3.33
Liberal	John Flett	2,411	46.23	-6.76
Labour	Henry Hargrave	179	3.43	
Total valid votes		5,215	100.00	

By-election on September 30, 1897
Party	Candidate	Votes	%	±%
Liberal	G.H. Bertram	2,212	52.99	+0.36
Conservative	O.A. Howland	1,962	47.01	-0.36
Total valid votes		4,174	100.00	

1896 Canadian federal election
Party	Candidate	Votes	%	±%
Liberal	William Lount	2,394	52.64	+8.44
Conservative	George Cockburn	2,154	47.36	-8.44
Total valid votes		4,548	100.00	

1891 Canadian federal election
Party	Candidate	Votes	%	±%
Conservative	George Cockburn	2,414	55.80	+0.28
Liberal	James Kirkpatrick Kerr	1,912	44.20	-0.28
Total valid votes		4,326	100.00	

1887 Canadian federal election
Party	Candidate	Votes	%	±%
Conservative	George Cockburn	2,282	55.52	
Liberal	John Harvie	1,828	44.48	-8.78
Total valid votes		4,110	100.00	

1882 Canadian federal election
Party	Candidate	Votes	%	±%
Liberal	Robert Hay	1,620	53.25	-5.58
Unknown	J.D. Edgar	1,422	46.75	
Total valid votes		3,042	100.00	

1878 Canadian federal election
Party	Candidate	Votes	%	±%
Liberal	Robert Hay	1,631	58.84	+3.64
Independent Liberal	John MacDonald	1,141	41.16	
Total valid votes		2,772	100.00	

Note: vote compared to 1874 election.

By-election on December 4, 1875
Party	Candidate	Votes
Liberal	John MacDonald	acc.

1874 Canadian federal election
Party	Candidate	Votes	%	±%
Liberal	Robert Wilkes	1,509	55.19	-0.76
Unknown	A. Morrison	1,225	44.81	
Total valid votes		–	100.00	

1872 Canadian federal election
Party	Candidate	Votes	%
Liberal	Robert Wilkes	1,509	55.95
Unknown	Mr. Shanly	1,188	44.05
Total valid votes		2,697	100.00

== See also ==
- List of Canadian electoral districts
- Historical federal electoral districts of Canada
