= Donald Stovel Macdonald =

Canadian lawyer and politician

The Honourable Donald Macdonald PC CC
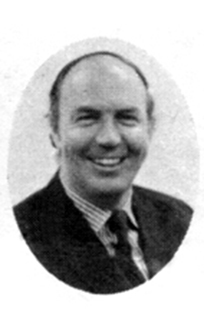
- Macdonald in 1974

Minister of Finance
- In office 26 September 1975 – 16 September 1977
- Prime Minister: Pierre Trudeau
- Preceded by: Charles Drury (acting)
- Succeeded by: Jean Chrétien

Minister of Energy, Mines and Resources
- In office 28 January 1972 – 25 September 1975
- Prime Minister: Pierre Trudeau
- Preceded by: Joe Greene
- Succeeded by: Alastair Gillespie

Minister of National Defence
- In office 24 September 1970 – 27 January 1972
- Prime Minister: Pierre Trudeau
- Preceded by: Léo Cadieux
- Succeeded by: Charles Drury (acting)

President of the Privy Council
- In office 6 July 1968 – 23 September 1970
- Prime Minister: Pierre Trudeau
- Preceded by: Allan MacEachen
- Succeeded by: Allan MacEachen

Member of Parliament for Rosedale
- In office 18 June 1962 – 28 February 1978
- Preceded by: David James Walker
- Succeeded by: David Crombie

Personal details
- Born: Donald Stovel Macdonald; 1 March 1932 Ottawa, Ontario, Canada
- Died: 14 October 2018 (aged 86) Toronto, Ontario, Canada
- Party: Liberal
- Spouse(s): Ruth Hutchison (m. 1961; died 1987) Adrian Merchant Lang (m. 1988)
- Children: 4 (plus 7 stepchildren)
- Education: University of Toronto; Harvard University; University of Cambridge
- Profession: Lawyer

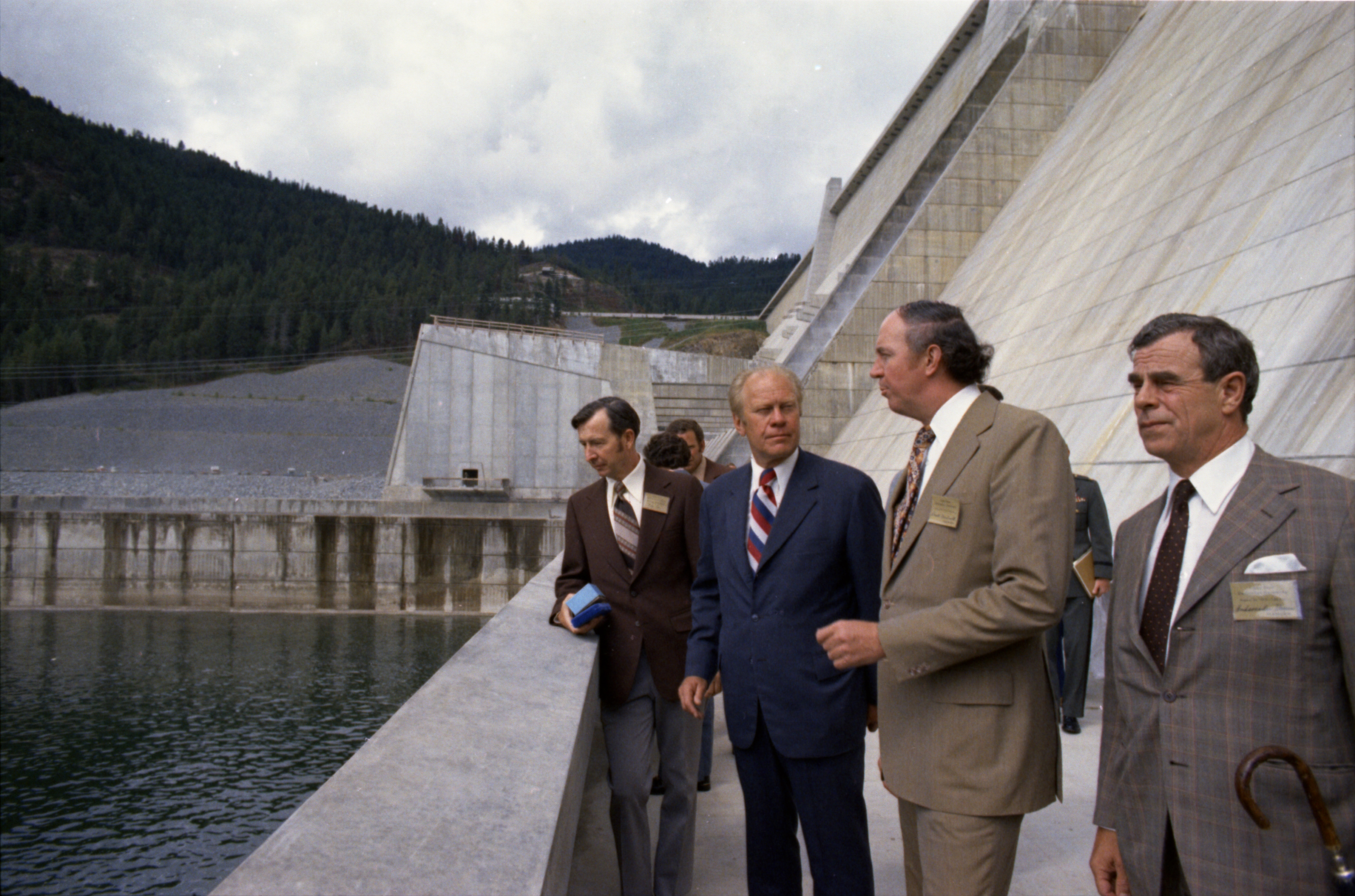
Macdonald with President Gerald Ford and others in 1975 on the Observation Deck at Libby Dam in Libby, Montana

Donald Stovel Macdonald PC CC (1 March 1932 – 14 October 2018) was a Canadian lawyer, politician and diplomat. Macdonald was a long-time Liberal party Member of Parliament and Cabinet minister. In the early 1980s, he headed a royal commission (known as the Macdonald Commission) which recommended that Canada enter a free trade agreement with the United States. From 1988 to 1991, Macdonald served as High Commissioner for Canada in the United Kingdom before returning to his law practice in Toronto.

== Early life and education ==
Macdonald was born in Ottawa, Ontario. He graduated from the University of Trinity College in the University of Toronto in 1952. He subsequently attended Harvard Law School (LLM), as well as the University of Cambridge in England (Diploma in International Law).

== Political career ==
He was first elected to the House of Commons of Canada in the 1962 election as the Liberal Member of Parliament for the Rosedale riding in Toronto. In 1967, he was the parliamentary secretary of Paul Martin Sr., Secretary of State for External Affairs. He joined the Cabinet of Pierre Trudeau in 1968 and served successively as President of the Privy Council, Minister of National Defence, Minister of Energy, Mines and Resources and Minister of Finance. As the finance minister, Macdonald introduced tougher employment insurance rules in his 1976 budget, as well as wage and price controls in an attempt to control inflation in his 1977 budget.

Macdonald resigned from Cabinet in 1977 to return to his law practice. When Trudeau announced his resignation as leader of the Liberal Party of Canada following his defeat in the 1979 election, Macdonald would have declared his candidacy for the position. However, with the unexpected defeat of Joe Clark's Progressive Conservative government on a motion of no confidence, the Liberals asked Trudeau to lead them into the 1980 election and cancelled the leadership campaign. Macdonald was not a candidate for the party leadership when Trudeau resigned again in 1984.

== Subsequent career ==
In 1982, Prime Minister Trudeau appointed Macdonald as chairman of a Royal Commission on the Economic Union and Development Prospects for Canada (known as the Macdonald Commission). The report was released in September 1985 and recommended, among other things, that Canada enter into a free trade agreement with the United States. Progressive Conservative Brian Mulroney was prime minister by this time. He accepted the recommendation and pursued what became the Canada–US Free Trade Agreement.

Macdonald was appointed as High Commissioner for Canada in the United Kingdom in 1988. He held that position until 1991, when he returned to his law practice in Toronto. He is also a past member of the Steering Committee of the Bilderberg Group.

== Honours and awards ==
In 1994, Macdonald was made a Companion of the Order of Canada. He received honorary degrees from the Colorado School of Mines, the University of New Brunswick, Carleton University, and the University of Toronto (Doctor of Sacred Letters, Trinity College, University of Toronto).

== Personal life ==
In 1961, Macdonald married Ruth Hutchison (1934–1987), and their four daughters are Leigh, Nikki, Althea, and Sonja. Nikki Macdonald served as a senior advisor to Jean Chrétien during his time as prime minister.

In 1988, he married Adrian Merchant Lang, the daughter of Sally Merchant. From her prior marriage to Otto Lang, she had seven children: Maria (d. 1991), Timothy, Gregory, Andrew, Elisabeth, Adrian, and Amanda Lang. They have fifteen grandchildren.

Macdonald died at his home in Toronto on 14 October 2018.

== Electoral record ==
1972 Canadian federal election: Rosedale
Party	Candidate	Votes	%	±%
Liberal	Donald S. Macdonald	16,073	44.02	
Progressive Conservative	Warren Beamish	14,856	40.69	
New Democratic	Ron Sabourin	4,598	12.59	
Independent	Aline Gregory	892	2.44	
Marxist–Leninist	David Starbuck	95	0.26	
Total valid votes		36,514	100.00	
Total rejected ballots		612		
Turnout		37,126	74.00	
Electors on the lists		50,169		
Source: Official Voting Results, Office of the Chief Electoral Officer (Canada), 1972.

== Archives ==
There is a Donald Stovel MacDonald fonds at Library and Archives Canada.

20th Canadian Ministry (1968–1979) – First cabinet of Pierre Trudeau
Cabinet posts (5)
Predecessor	Office	Successor
Charles Drury (acting)	Minister of Finance; 1975–1977	Jean Chrétien
Joe Greene	Minister of Energy, Mines and Resources; 1972–1975	Alastair Gillespie
Charles Drury (acting)	Minister of National Defence; 1970–1972	Edgar Benson
Allan MacEachen (acting)	President of the Queen's Privy Council for Canada; July 6, 1968 – September 23, 1970	Allan MacEachen
	Minister Without Portfolio; April 20, 1968 – July 5, 1968	
Special Parliamentary Responsibilities
Predecessor	Title	Successor
Allan MacEachen	Leader of the Government in the House of Commons; September 12, 1968 – September 23, 1970	Allan MacEachen
Diplomatic posts
Preceded by Roy McMurtry	Canadian High Commissioner to the United Kingdom; 1988–1991	Succeeded by Fredrik Stefan Eaton
