= Michael Shapcott =

Canadian academic

- Citizenship: Canadian
- Education: Faculty of Divinity, Trinity College, University of Toronto (current) London School of Economics and Political Science, Political economy of public policy (2008) University of Toronto, Law (1983–1986 attr) The University of Calgary, General studies - political science (1980–1982)
- Alma mater: University of Toronto
- Occupation: Executive Director (2018–present)
- Employer: Sorrento Centre
- Organization(s): Retreat and conference centre
- Known for: Housing and homeless advocacy; diaconal ministry; management
- Movement: affordable housing, homelessness, social initiatives, health and housing
- Website: www.sorrentocentre.ca

Michael Shapcott is a Canadian academic, advocate, and executive director of the Sorrento Centre. His public policy work focuses on housing, homelessness, and human rights. He previously served as the director of national business and community strategy for Prince's Charities Canada and director of affordable housing and social innovation at the Wellesley Institute, a non-profit and non-partisan research and policy think tank in Toronto, Ontario, Canada.

== Education ==
Michael Shapcott attended Alexander Galt Regional High School (1970–1972), studied political science at the University of Calgary (1980–1982), and studied law at the University of Toronto (1983–1986). He was not called to the bar but instead began working at the Christian Resource Centre as a homeless outreach worker and community and housing developer. He attended summer programming at the London School of Economics in 2008. Shapcott is completing a Master of Theological Studies at the Faculty of Divinity, Trinity College, University of Toronto (2016–present).

== Career ==
For the first decade of his working life, Shapcott was a print journalist, working as a reporter, columnist and editor at several Canadian newspapers—including the North Bay Nugget, the Oakville Journal Record and the Calgary Albertan.

=== Initiatives and projects ===
In 1989, Shapcott, Bart Poesiat, and future Toronto mayor Barbara Hall created the Rupert Pilot Project to fund affordable housing initiatives, which received substantial funding from the Ontario government in the early 1990s.

Shapcott came to public attention in the late 1980s and early 1990s for his work in the BASIC Poverty Action Group, which was the genesis of the Bread Not Circuses coalition that argued that the money being spent on Toronto's bid for the 1996 Summer Olympics could be better spent on housing. His detractors vilified him for helping compromise the city's bid for the 1996 Olympic Games.

He was manager of the Community/University Research Partnerships (CURP) program at the University of Toronto's Centre for Urban and Community Studies, where he promoted links between academic research and social justice. Shapcott is a founding member of the National Housing and Homelessness Network and the Toronto Disaster Relief Committee. He served on the board and as president of the Toronto Environmental Alliance. He also served on the global board of the Habitat International Coalition. Shapcott was a founder of the Multifaith Alliance to End Homelessness in Toronto (2007). Prior to that, he was manager of government relations and communications at the Co-operative Housing Federation of Canada (Ontario Region).

Shapcott is a founding member and served as a board member of the Canadian Alliance to End Homelessness, which has emerged as a leading Canadian advocacy organization.

=== Electoral politics ===
In 2004, Shapcott entered electoral politics by running as the New Democratic Party's candidate in Toronto Centre in the 2004 federal election, placing second to Liberal incumbent Bill Graham. He made his second attempt in the same riding in the 2006 federal election, increasing the NDP vote to its highest level ever in the riding.

=== Religious service ===
Shapcott was ordained as a deacon in the Anglican Church of Canada in the Diocese of Toronto in 2016. He is licensed to serve as a deacon in the Diocese of Kootenay, in the Ecclesiastical Province of British Columbia and Yukon, Anglican Church of Canada.

=== Governmental bodies ===
Over the years, Shapcott has been appointed to and has served on governmental bodies at the federal, provincial and local levels, including the Downtown Community Health Board, Toronto Board of Health (1990), the Corporate Minimum Tax Working Group of the Ontario Fair Tax Commission (1991), and numerous others. He continues to be active in governmental issues, most recently serving as an appointed member of the Columbia-Shuswap Regional District's Sorrento-Blind Bay Incorporation Advisory Committee (2019–present).

== Honors and awards ==
Shapcott was awarded the first Terence and Alice Jean Finlay Bursary for studies that celebrate and advance diversity in the Anglican Church, Diocese of Toronto (2017), and the Queen Elizabeth II Diamond Jubilee Medal for outstanding community service (2012).

== Selected publications ==
- In his often-cited report, Shapcott uses a graphic entitled "Precarious housing iceberg" to represent the layers on the spectrum of precarious housing in Canada in 2010. Above the water line, the visible iceberg represents the visible homeless (150,000–300,000), but below the water, other layers on the spectrum of housing vulnerabilities include the hidden homeless (450,000–900,000), overcrowded (705,165 h/hs), substandard housing (1.3 million h/hs), core housing need (1.5 million h/hs), inadequate housing (2 million h/hs), annual housing supply deficit (220,000 h/hs), and unaffordable housing (3.1 million h/hs).
- Co-author, with Jack Layton. Homelessness, How to End the National Crisis, Revised and Edited.
- Co-editor, with David Hulchanski, Finding Room: Policy Options for a Canadian Rental Housing Strategy.
