= Bill Graham (Canadian politician) =

Canadian lawyer and politician (1939–2022)

The Honourable Bill Graham PC OC QC
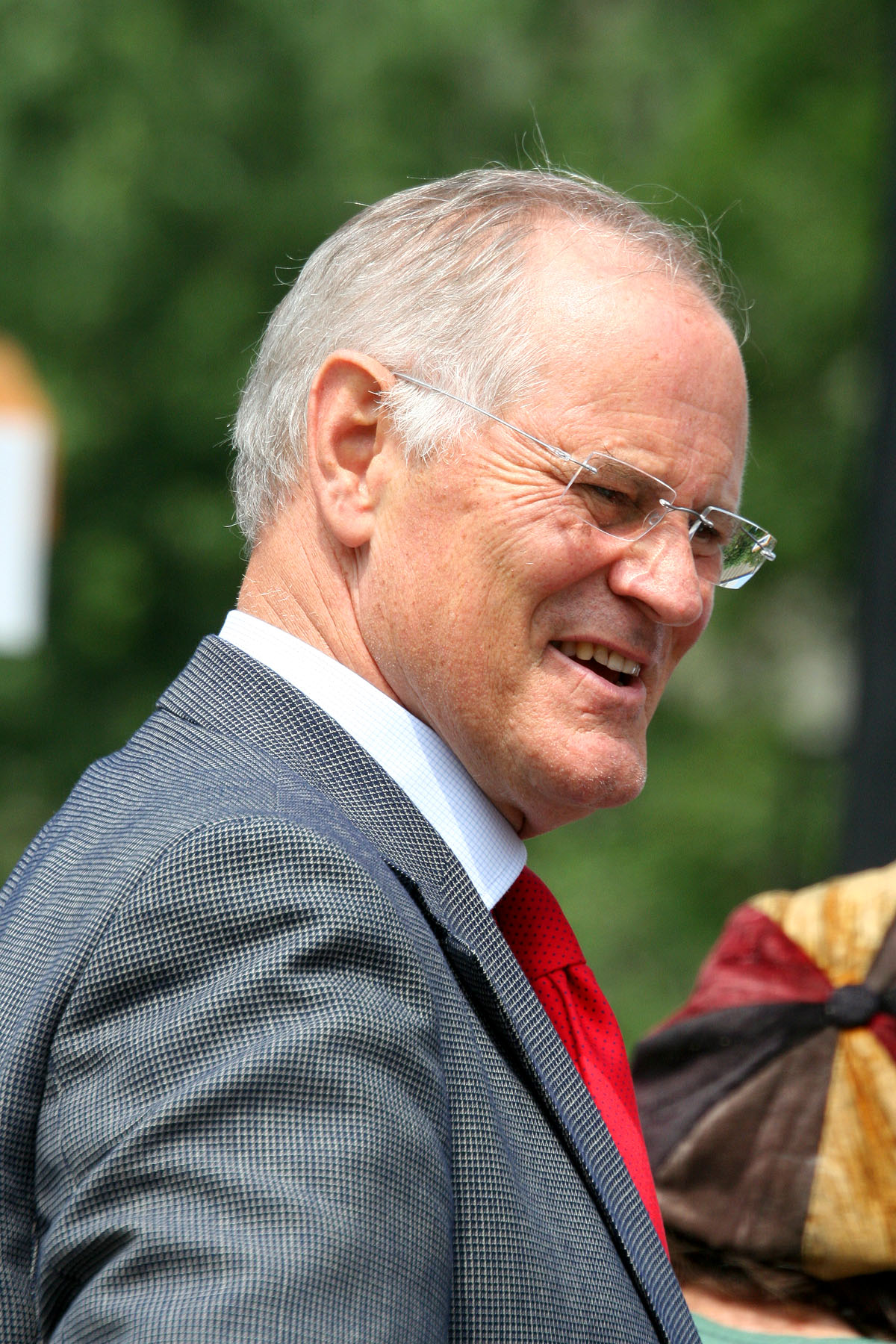
- Graham in 2007

Leader of the Opposition
- In office February 6, 2006 – December 2, 2006
- Monarch: Elizabeth II
- Prime Minister: Stephen Harper
- Preceded by: Stephen Harper
- Succeeded by: Stéphane Dion

Interim Leader of the Liberal Party
- In office March 19, 2006 – December 3, 2006
- Deputy: Lucienne Robillard
- Preceded by: Paul Martin
- Succeeded by: Stéphane Dion

Minister of National Defence
- In office July 20, 2004 – February 6, 2006
- Prime Minister: Paul Martin
- Preceded by: David Pratt
- Succeeded by: Gordon O'Connor

Minister of Foreign Affairs
- In office January 15, 2002 – July 19, 2004
- Prime Minister: Jean Chrétien; Paul Martin
- Preceded by: John Manley
- Succeeded by: Pierre Pettigrew

Member of the Canadian Parliament for Toronto Centre (Toronto Centre—Rosedale; 1997–2004)
- In office October 25, 1993 – July 2, 2007
- Preceded by: David MacDonald
- Succeeded by: Bob Rae

Personal details
- Born: William Carvel Graham; March 17, 1939 Montreal, Quebec, Canada
- Died: August 7, 2022 (aged 83) Toronto, Ontario, Canada
- Party: Liberal
- Spouse: Catherine Curry (m. 1962)
- Occupation: Lawyer; academic; politician

Military service
- Allegiance: Canada
- Branch/service: Royal Canadian Navy Reserve
- Years of service: 1960–1970
- Rank: Sub-lieutenant
- Unit: University Naval Training Division

Academic background
- Education: Trinity College, Toronto (BA); University of Toronto Faculty of Law (LLB); University of Paris (DEA)

Academic work
- Discipline: Law
- Sub-discipline: International law
- Institutions: University of Toronto

William Carvel Graham (March 17, 1939 – August 7, 2022) was a Canadian lawyer, academic and politician. Graham served as the minister of foreign affairs, minister of national defence, leader of the opposition and interim leader of the Liberal Party of Canada. After leaving politics, he was the chancellor of Trinity College at the University of Toronto.

== Early life ==
According to his birth certificate, Graham was born on March 17, 1939, in Montreal, Quebec, to Loring and Helen (née White) Bailey. He was the youngest of four siblings: Arthur, Loring Jr and Helen. His parents divorced five months before he was born. On June 9, 1940, his mother married Francis Ronald Graham Sr, a wealthy widower over twenty years her senior with ten children of his own. Shortly after the wedding, his mother and stepfather moved to Vancouver, British Columbia, and Bill and Helen were raised by their maternal grandparents in Toronto, Ontario. In 1943, when Bill was four, he joined his mother and stepfather in Vancouver. Graham Sr. died in 1963; at his funeral, Graham learned that his stepfather was actually his biological father. His paternal grandparents were Protestant Irish immigrants.

He was educated at Upper Canada College, Trinity College at the University of Toronto, the University of Toronto Faculty of Law (where he was an editor of the Law Review and the gold medalist of 1964), and the University of Paris. As a student, he travelled in the Middle East and Europe. While at university, he served in the Royal Canadian Naval Reserve under the University Naval Training Division (UNTD), obtaining his commission as a Sub-Lieutenant in 1960.

He married the former Catherine Curry in 1962, and they have a daughter, Katherine, and a son, the journalist and screenwriter Patrick Graham.

== Early career ==
After his graduation from law school, Graham went to Paris to pursue a doctorate of laws, with a focus on international law, as well as to improve his French. He received his Docteur de l'université (DU) in 1970. He also represented a Toronto law firm, Fasken and Calvin (known as Faskens) (where he had articled), in Europe. Upon returning to Toronto in 1968, Graham remained at Faskens until 1982 working with Walter Williston in litigation and on his own in an international trade and commercial law practice.

He also became active in civic affairs, particularly the promotion of bilingualism. He served as a director and, from 1979 to 1987, president of Alliance Francaise de Toronto. In 1975, Graham was appointed by Ontario Attorney General Roy McMurtry to an advisory committee on the implementation of bilingualism in provincial courts.

=== Professor ===
Graham moved from the practice of law to academia in 1981, when he took a faculty position at the University of Toronto Faculty of Law, teaching EEC law, public international law, and international trade law until 1993. Graham became president of the University of Toronto Faculty Association, where he was strongly critical of Joseph Rotman's donation to the then-Faculty of Management in 1995. The donor agreement included several clauses that could limit the university and faculty of management's academic freedom. The agreement required that “U of T [rank] the faculty of management as one of its ‘highest priorities’ for the allocation of university funding, ensuring to its ‘best efforts’ that business education receives continuing focus.” Graham noted “the unqualified support for the ‘vision,’ and it talked about non-qualified support for and commitment to the values and principles underlying the ‘vision’ by the members of the faculty of management, as well as the central administration". As a result, the donation agreement underwent some substantial revisions.

Graham also held visiting lectureships at McGill University and the Université de Montréal. In 1999, he endowed a chair in international law at the law school.

== Political career ==
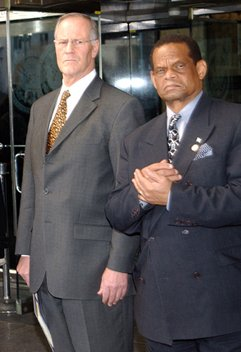
Graham (left) and Saint Lucia foreign minister, Julian Hunte (right)

Graham twice sought election unsuccessfully to the House of Commons as a Liberal in the riding of Toronto Centre-Rosedale, losing in 1984 to the Progressive Conservative incumbent, former Toronto Mayor David Crombie, and very narrowly (by 80 votes) in 1988 to Progressive Conservative candidate David MacDonald. He defeated MacDonald in the 1993 federal election, and was reelected in 1997, 2000, 2004 and 2006.

He served as a member, and for six years as chair, of the House of Commons Standing Committee on Foreign Affairs and International Trade (SCFAIT). Under his chairmanship, SCFAIT produced public reports on the role of nuclear weapons in world politics, Canada and the circumpolar world, the future of the World Trade Organization (WTO), the Multilateral Agreement on Investment (MAI), hemispheric free trade, and Canadian relations with Europe and the Muslim world. Graham also promoted "parliamentary diplomacy" and was active in the creation or operation of many international fora for parliamentarians, including the Parliamentary Assembly of the Organization for Security and Cooperation in Europe (OSCE), of which he was Treasurer, and the Canada-US Parliamentary Association. He was also the Liberal Party of Canada's representative to Liberal International (of which he was Treasurer) and the first elected Chair of the Inter-Parliamentary Forum of the Americas.

While his attention as an MP was directed largely to foreign affairs, in domestic politics he strongly promoted same-sex rights. This issue was of considerable importance in his riding, which contains Canada's largest gay neighbourhood. He supported same-sex pensions and the admission to Canada of gay refugees facing persecution for their sexual identity, and he was an early proponent of legal recognition of same-sex marriage. He was voted Toronto's best MP several times by the readers of the city's 'Now' Magazine, and he was the recipient of Pride Toronto's lifetime achievement award in 2007.

== Minister of Foreign Affairs ==
In January 2002, Prime Minister Jean Chrétien appointed Graham as Minister of Foreign Affairs. His tenure was largely dominated by the changes to world affairs flowing from the 9/11 terrorist attacks and the increased unilateralism of American foreign policy. In the months leading up to the 2003 American-led invasion of Iraq, Chrétien and Graham articulated a position of opposition to military action without either an unambiguous authorizing resolution by the United Nations Security Council or clear evidence that Saddam Hussein's regime was in violation of the obligations to disarm that it had accepted after the 1991 Gulf War. A Canadian compromise allowing additional time for weapons inspections, but with a firm deadline for Iraqi compliance, elicited strong American opposition and little enthusiasm from other Security Council members. After a resolution (sponsored by the US, the UK, and Spain) that explicitly authorized military action was withdrawn in the face of likely failure, Canada declined to take part in the subsequent invasion.

Canada did support important elements of the US-led war on terror, and Canadian troops participated in the UN-sanctioned invasion of Afghanistan to oust the Taliban regime in October 2001. In the summer of 2003, Chrétien and Graham committed Canada to assume the lead role in the International Security Assistance Force (ISAF), the NATO mission in Afghanistan. ISAF was initially responsible for securing Kabul and its environs, but an October 2003 Security Council resolution authorized its extension through much of the country.

Some aspects of Canadian–American cooperation in the war on terror worked smoothly, but there were instances of misunderstanding or miscommunication. Perhaps the most widely noticed came after American authorities deported a Canadian citizen, Maher Arar, to Syria, where he was imprisoned for a year and tortured, apparently on the basis of intelligence quietly relayed by the Royal Canadian Mounted Police (RCMP). Unable to get RCMP support for Arar's release, Graham urged Prime Minister Chrétien to intervene. Following Chrétien's representations, Arar was released and a judicial inquiry conducted into his case. Graham testified that he was unaware at the time that the RCMP had passed information to the American authorities. Graham also unsuccessfully urged his American counterpart, Colin Powell, to consent to the release of Omar Khadr, a Canadian national taken prisoner by American forces in Afghanistan while a minor and held at the US Guantanamo Bay detention camp. Despite these differences, Graham and Powell had good relations and cooperated effectively on a number of issues, including the despatch of 500 Canadian Forces personnel to Haiti as a short-term stabilization force after the ouster of President Jean-Bertrand Aristide.

== Minister of National Defence ==
When Graham's former law school classmate Paul Martin succeeded Chrétien as Prime Minister in December 2003, Martin left Graham at Foreign Affairs, but after an election in June 2004 reduced the Liberals to a minority, Martin moved him to National Defence. This would normally be regarded as a demotion, but Martin had promised during the election campaign to increase defence spending, and he indicated to Graham that he would enjoy prime ministerial backing in his efforts to rebuild the Canadian military after the economies resulting from the deficit-reduction program that Martin had implemented in the early 1990s as Minister of Finance.

In Graham's first months as Defence Minister, one of the most pressing issues was the Canadian response to the George W. Bush administration's invitation to take part in its Ballistic Missile Defence (BMD) program. Graham offered qualified support to Canadian participation, in part because he feared that nonparticipation would marginalize the North American Air Defence Command (NORAD) within continental defence arrangements. But opposition to BMD and Bush administration policies generally was strong in Canada, and Martin did not provide energetic backing for Graham's efforts to convince his Cabinet and Caucus colleagues. In February 2005, Graham informed his American counterpart, Donald Rumsfeld, that Canadian participation was politically impossible.

In July 2005, as part of a tour of Canada's arctic defense installations, Graham visited Hans Island, the sovereignty of which was disputed by Canada and Denmark. Denmark publicly protested the visit, but subsequently entered into negotiations to settle the island's status.

Perhaps Graham's biggest success as Defence Minister was implementing a new doctrinal and budgetary framework for Canadian defence policy. He persuaded Martin and Finance Minister Ralph Goodale to accept a $13-billion increase in defence spending, the largest in a generation, as part of the 2005 budget. This entailed significant capital expenditures, including the acquisition of Hercules aircraft to provide the Canadian Forces (CF) with tactical airlift capability. In addition, the CF command structure was overhauled to improve the capacity to respond to either domestic disaster or terrorist threat, including the creation of a new Canada Command.

Graham and General Rick Hillier, whose 2005 appointment as Chief of the Defence Staff (CDS) he recommended, sought to transform the CF into a more mobile force, capable of conducting armed "peacemaking" and humanitarian interventions. This broke with both the Cold War emphasis on preparation for large-scale conventional hostilities across defined international borders, and the recent Canadian tradition of lightly armed peacekeeping under UN auspices. Restoring security and order to the failed or failing states that served as bases for terrorists was placed at the centre of CF doctrine. This conception of the CF's future role was set out in a Defence Policy Statement that fed into the Martin government's broader review of Canadian foreign policy.

Graham and Hillier persuaded Martin to make Afghanistan a laboratory for the new doctrine; in the spring of 2005 the Canadian government announced that the 1,200 Canadian troops in Kabul would be transferred to Kandahar province. Canada assumed a major role in Southern Afghanistan, with 2,300 personnel there by early 2006. Graham and Hillier supported a "3D" or "whole of government" approach, based on the concept of the Provincial Reconstruction Team (PRT), in which diplomats, military, police, development and reconstruction specialists work together to provide security and rebuild societal institutions. During Graham's tenure as Defence Minister, Canada's Disaster Assistance Response Team (DART) provided emergency relief to Sri Lanka after the 2005 tsunami.

In the weeks leading up to the January 2006 federal election, Graham oversaw the negotiations of an agreement, signed by Hillier and the Afghan Defence Minister, governing the treatment of Afghan detainees captured by Canadian personnel and turned over to Afghan authorities. After revelations in 2010 that some detainees had been tortured, Graham appeared before a parliamentary committee investigating the matter. He conceded that the agreement had been imperfect, lacking as it did a mechanism for monitoring the treatment of prisoners after they were placed in Afghan custody, but pointed out that its omissions were more readily apparent in retrospect than they were at the time, and that it had been developed on the best available advice to meet unprecedented circumstances.

=== Interim Liberal leader ===
After the Liberals were defeated in the 2006 election and the Conservatives formed a minority government under Stephen Harper, Graham served as interim Leader of the Liberal Party and Leader of the Opposition, until the December 2006 leadership convention that elected Stéphane Dion as Leader. Graham was neutral in the race to choose a new leader. On February 22, 2007, he announced he would not be a candidate for reelection in the next federal election. On June 19, he announced that he was stepping down as an MP, effective July 2. This freed up the seat for former Ontario Premier and leadership contender Bob Rae (who, like Graham, would later become interim Liberal leader) to run as the Liberal candidate in the resulting by-election.

== Electoral history ==
2006 Canadian federal election
Party	Candidate	Votes	%	±%
Liberal	Bill Graham	30,874	52.23	-4.30
New Democratic	Michael Shapcott	14,036	23.74	-0.01
Conservative	Lewis Reford	10,763	18.21	+3.42
Green	Chris Tindal	3,080	5.21	+1.30
Communist	Johan Boyden	120	0.2	0.00
Independent	Michel Prairie	101	0.2	0.00
Animal Alliance	Liz White	72	0.12	
Marxist–Leninist	Philip Fernandez	66	0.11	-0.01
Total valid votes		59,112	100.00	
Liberal hold		Swing	−2.1	

2004 Canadian federal election: Toronto Centre (federal electoral district)
Party	Candidate	Votes	%	±%
Liberal	Bill Graham	30,336	56.53	+1.26
New Democratic	Michael Shapcott	12,747	23.75	+12.39
Conservative	Megan Harris	7,936	14.79	−13.00
Green	Gabriel Draven	2,097	3.91	
Marijuana	Jay Wagner	313	0.58	−0.94
Communist	Dan Goldstick	106	0.20	−0.05
Marxist–Leninist	Philip Fernandez	65	0.12	−0.12
Canadian Action	Kevin Peck	63	0.12	−2.97
Total valid votes		53,663	100.00	
Conservative vote is compared to the total of the Canadian Alliance vote and Progressive Conservative vote in 2000 election.

=== Toronto Centre—Rosedale, 1996–2003 ===
2000 Canadian federal election: Toronto Centre—Rosedale
Party	Candidate	Votes	%	±%
Liberal	Bill Graham	26,203	55.33	+6.08
Progressive Conservative	Randall Pearce	8,149	17.21	-2.13
New Democratic	David Berlin	5,300	11.19	-9.22
Alliance	Richard Walker	5,058	10.68	+2.83
Canadian Action	Paul Hellyer	1,466	3.10	+2.44
Marijuana	Neev Tapiero	722	1.52	
Natural Law	David Gordon	224	0.47	-0.11
Communist	Dan Goldstick	121	0.26	
Marxist–Leninist	Philip Fernandez	116	0.24	-0.11
Total valid votes		47,359	100.00	
Total rejected ballots		246	0.52	−0.38
Turnout		47,605	57.19	−9.82
Electors on the lists		83,243		
Sources: Official Results, Elections Canada, Poll-by-poll Result Files, Elections Canada, and Financial Returns, Elections Canada.

1997 Canadian federal election
Party	Candidate	Votes	%	±%
Liberal	Bill Graham	22,945	49.19	-0.80
New Democratic	David MacDonald	9,597	20.58	+9.80
Progressive Conservative	Stephen Probyn	8,993	19.28	-1.96
Reform	John Stewart	3,646	7.82	-4.65
Green	Jim Harris	577	1.24	+0.30
Canadian Action	Anthony Robert Pedrette	303	0.65	
Natural Law	Ron Parker	270	0.58	-1.01
Marxist–Leninist	Steve Rutchinski	166	0.36	+0.25
Independent	Ted W. Culp	145	0.31	
Total valid votes		46,642	100.00	

=== Rosedale, 1993–1996 ===
1993 Canadian federal election
Party	Candidate	Votes	%	±%
Liberal	Bill Graham	25,726	50.00	+8.78
Progressive Conservative	David MacDonald	10,930	21.24	-20.12
Reform	Daniel Jovkovic	6,413	12.46	
New Democratic	Jack Layton	5,547	10.78	-4.28
National	Martin Lanigan	1,091	2.12	
Natural Law	Doug Henning	817	1.59	
Green	Leslie Hunter	483	0.94	+0.22
Independent	Linda Dale Gibbons	350	0.68	
Marxist–Leninist	Steve Rutchinski	57	0.11	
Abolitionist	Yann Patrice D'Audibert Garcien	40	0.08	
Total valid votes		51,454	100.00	

1988 Canadian federal election
Party	Candidate	Votes	%	±%
Progressive Conservative	David MacDonald	22,704	41.36	-11.44
Liberal	Bill Graham	22,624	41.21	+15.08
New Democratic	Doug Wilson	8,266	15.06	-2.77
Libertarian	Chris Blatchly	411	0.75	+0.09
Green	Frank de Jong	397	0.72	-1.14
Rhinoceros	Liane McLarty	265	0.48	
Independent	Mike Constable	102	0.19	
Independent	Harry Margel	91	0.17	
Commonwealth of Canada	Paul Therrien	33	0.06	-0.27
Total valid votes		54,893	100.00	

1984 Canadian federal election
Party	Candidate	Votes	%	±%
Progressive Conservative	David Crombie	23,211	52.80	+8.84
Liberal	Bill Graham	11,488	26.13	-12.95
New Democratic	Dell Wolfson	7,836	17.82	+2.97
Green	Shirley Ruth Farlinger	821	1.87	
Libertarian	Clarke Slemon	291	0.66	+0.30
Communist	Sylvie Baillargeon	172	0.39	+0.17
Commonwealth of Canada	David Dube	144	0.33	
Total valid votes		43,963	100.00	

== After politics ==
Following his departure from electoral politics, Graham was active in a number of organizations and business concerns. In 2007, he was elected Chancellor at Trinity College, Toronto. He was Visitor at Green College, where he was also an Honorary Life Fellow. He was also the Chair of the Atlantic Council of Canada from 2007 to 2012, Chair of the Canadian International Council, and was a member of the Trilateral Commission. He was the Honorary Colonel of the Governor General's Horse Guards from 2009 to 2018, and received an honorary doctorate from the Royal Military College of Canada in 2010. In 2018, he was appointed Honorary Colonel of Canadian Special Forces Operations Command. From 2012 to 2018, he was co-chair of the advisory board of the Creative Destruction Lab. As a member of the Queen's Privy Council for Canada since 2002, Graham was entitled to use the style of "The Honourable" and the post-nominal "PC" for life. He received various honours for his services to the French language and culture in Ontario, including appointment by the French government as Chevalier of the Legion of Honour and Chevalier of the Order of the Pleiade. He was a recipient of the Jean-Baptiste Rousseau Prize, and the Doctoral Ring of Siena, and a Patron of Liberal International. In 2015, he was made a member of the Order of Canada. In 2014, he received the St. Laurent Award from the NATO Association of Canada, and 2016 the Global Citizen Award from the United Nations Association of Canada. In 2017, he was awarded the Vimy Award by the Conference of Defence Associations. In 2011, he endowed the Bill Graham Centre for Contemporary International History, and sat on its advisory board. The centre is associated with Trinity College and the Munk School of Global Affairs and Public Policy at the University of Toronto. It seeks to promote the study of contemporary events from a historical perspective, and to bring together the worlds of the policymaker and the scholar.

Graham participated in the Government of Canada's Defence Review, as one of four members of a Minister's Advisory Panel, providing input for Defence Minister Harjit Sajjan. The review aimed to consult with Canadians across the country in order to develop a future road map for Canada's defence policy. In June 2017, it was released as "Strong, Secure, Engaged."

In 2016, Graham published an autobiography, Call of the World: A Political Memoir, reprinted in paperback in 2018.

Graham died on August 7, 2022, at his home in Toronto after a period of ill health.

== Honours ==
Ribbon	Description	Notes
	Order of Canada (OC)	Member; May 8, 2015; Officer; November 27, 2020
	Queen Elizabeth II Golden Jubilee Medal	2002; Canadian Version of this Medal
	Queen Elizabeth II Diamond Jubilee Medal	2012; Canadian Version of this Medal
	Legion of Honour	Chevalier
	Order of La Pléiade	Chevalier

=== Scholastic ===
University Degrees

Location	Date	School	Degree
Ontario		Upper Canada College	
Ontario	1961	Trinity College, Toronto	Bachelor of Arts (BA) in Modern History
Ontario	1964	University of Toronto	Bachelor of Laws (LL.B)
France		University of Paris	

Chancellor, visitor, governor, rector and fellowships

Location	Date	School	Position
Ontario	2007 –	Trinity College, Toronto	Chancellor
Ontario	–	Massey College	Senior Fellow
British Columbia	–	Green College	Honorary Life Fellow

Honorary Degrees

Location	Date	School	Degree
Ontario	June 1, 2010	Royal Military College of Canada	Doctor of Laws (LL.D)
Ontario	June 15, 2018	University of Toronto	Doctor of Laws (LL.D)

=== Appointments ===
Location	Date	Institution	Position
Canada	January 16, 2002 –	Queen's Privy Council for Canada	Member (PC)
Canada	–	Government of Canada	Queen's Counsel (QC)

=== Honorary military appointments ===
- (Canada) 2007 – 2012: Honorary Lieutenant-Colonel of the Governor General's Horse Guards
- (Canada) 2012 – 2018: Honorary Colonel of the Governor General's Horse Guards

== Works ==
- Graham, Bill (2016). Call of the World: A Political Memoir. C.D. Howe Series in Political History. Vancouver: University of British Columbia Press. ISBN 978-0-77489000-7.

== See also ==
- Richard Proulx (police officer)

26th Canadian Ministry (1993–2003) – Cabinet of Jean Chrétien
Cabinet post
Preceded by John Manley	Minister of Foreign Affairs; 2002–2003	Succeeded by cont'd into 27th Min.
27th Canadian Ministry (2003–2006) – Cabinet of Paul Martin
Cabinet posts (2)
Preceded by David Pratt	Minister of National Defence; 2004–2006	Succeeded by Gordon O'Connor
cont'd from 26th Min.	Minister of Foreign Affairs; 2003–2004	Succeeded by Pierre Pettigrew
Party political offices
Preceded by Paul Martin	Leader of the Liberal Party of Canada; Interim; March 18, 2006 – December 2, 2006	Succeeded by Stéphane Dion
Academic offices
Preceded by Michael Wilson	Chancellor of the University of Trinity College; 2007–2022	Succeeded by Brian D. Lawson
