= Animal Protection Party of Canada =

Canadian federal political party

- Leader: Liz White
- Founded: 2005 (as Animal Alliance Environment Voters Party of Canada)
- Merger of: Animals Alliance of Canada; Environment Voters
- Headquarters: 101–221 Broadview Avenue; Toronto, Ontario; M4M 2G3
- Ideology: Animal rights; Environmentalism
- Senate: 0 / 105
- House of Commons: 0 / 343

Website
- animalprotectionparty.ca

The Animal Protection Party of Canada (French: Parti pour la protection des animaux du Canada) is a federal political party in Canada that focuses on animal rights and environmentalism. It was formed in 2005 as the Animal Alliance Environment Voters Party of Canada by the merger of two organizations, the Animal Alliance of Canada and Environment Voters; it changed to its current name in 2016. Both parent organizations have been vocal in opposition to the seal hunt in Newfoundland and Labrador, fur farming, trapping, and bear hunting. The party is led by Liz White, a Toronto-based animal rights advocate.

== Influence of electoral law ==
Federal laws restricting political advocacy by "third parties" (i.e., organizations not registered by Elections Canada as political parties) during election campaigns led to the formation of this party. Following a Supreme Court of Canada ruling that allowed political parties to be registered by only running a single candidate, animal rights activists formed the party. The AAEV party provides its members and candidates the opportunity to promote its views during election periods.

The party originally endorsed major-party candidates who promoted positions favourable to its own. In the 2006 general election, AAEV's free-time political ads endorsed the New Democratic Party, counterbalanced by the statement that voters could also vote for AAEV party leader Liz White in Toronto Centre.

Canadian electoral laws hinder misuse of this loophole by setting campaign spending limits for parties, proportional to the number of voters in the electoral districts where the party is running candidates. Because the AAEV was running only one candidate, it was permitted to spend $66,715.37, compared to the $18,225,260.74 limits granted to the major national parties. In 2008, the party ran four candidates. In 2011, it ran seven candidates with one candidate in the Western Arctic riding. In 2015, the party ran eight candidates, with one in Victoria, British Columbia. In 2019, the party ran 15 candidates. The party now acts like a traditional political party and rarely endorses other parties or candidates.

== Candidates ==
=== 2008 candidates ===
In the 2008 general election, the AAEVPC fielded four candidates, all in Ontario:

1. Marie Crawford in Toronto–Danforth
2. Karen Levenson in Guelph
3. Simon Luisi in Davenport
4. Liz White in Toronto Centre

=== 2011 candidates ===
In the 2011 general election, the AAEVPC fielded seven candidates: six in Ontario, one in the territories:

1. Marie Crawford in Toronto—Danforth
2. Bonnie Dawson in Western Arctic
3. Karen Levenson in Guelph
4. Simon Luisi in Davenport
5. Yvonne Mackie in Newmarket—Aurora
6. AnnaMaria Valastro in London North Centre
7. Liz White in Thornhill

=== 2015 candidates ===
In the 2015 general election, the AAEVPC fielded eight candidates: seven in Ontario, one in British Columbia:

1. Elizabeth Abbott in Toronto—Danforth
2. Kyle Bowles in Aurora-Oak Ridges-Richmond Hill
3. Jody Di Bartolomeo in Niagara Centre
4. Emma Hawley-Yan in Waterloo
5. Simon Luisi in University-Rosedale
6. Jordan Reichert in Victoria
7. Rudy Brunell Solomonivici in Eglinton-Lawrence
8. Liz White in Etobicoke-Lakeshore

=== 2019 candidates ===
In the 2019 general election, the APPC fielded fifteen candidates: eight in Ontario, two in British Columbia, two in New Brunswick, one in Quebec, one in Nova Scotia, and one in Alberta.

1. Liz White in University-Rosedale
2. Shelby Bertrand in Ottawa Centre
3. Natalie Spizziri in Mississauga-Streetsville
4. Simon Luisi in Scarborough Southwest
5. Ellen Pappenburg in Kitchener Centre
6. Rob Lewen in Toronto Centre
7. Elizabeth Abbott in Toronto—Danforth
8. Chanel Lalonde in Sudbury (federal electoral district)
9. Victoria de Martigny in Lac-Saint-Louis
10. Brad MacDonald in Moncton-Riverview-Dieppe
11. Lesley Thomas in Fredericton
12. Bill Wilson in Halifax
13. Eden Gould in Calgary Centre
14. Jordan Reichert in Victoria
15. Kira Cheeseborough in Kamloops-Thompson-Cariboo

=== 2021 candidates ===
In the 2021 federal election, the APPC fielded ten candidates: six in Ontario, one in British Columbia, two in Quebec, and one in Manitoba.

1. Kimberly LaMontange in Laurier Saint-Marie
2. Lucas Munger in Drummond
3. Shelby Bertrand in Ottawa Centre
4. Liz White in Toronto-Danforth
5. Peter Stubbins in Toronto Centre
6. Natalie Spizziri in Mississauga-Streetsville
7. Karen Levenson in Guelph
8. Ellen Papenburg in Kitchener Centre
9. Debra Wall in Winnipeg Centre
10. Jordan Reichert in Victoria

=== 2025 candidates ===
In 2025 federal election, the APPC fielded 7 candidates: four in Ontario, one in British Columbia, one in Manitoba, and one in Newfoundland and Labrador.

1. Mike Peach in Cape Spear
2. Liz White in Toronto-Danforth
3. Edward Fraser in Taiaiako'n—Parkdale—High Park
4. Ellen Papenburg in Kitchener Centre
5. Simon Luisi in Toronto Centre
6. Debra Wall in Winnipeg Centre
7. Teresa Knight Courtenay-Alberni

== Election results ==
Election	# of candidates	# of votes	% of popular vote	% in contested ridings
2006	1	72	0.00%	0.120%
2008 by-election	1	123	0.00%	0.51%
2008	4	527	0.00%	0.277%
2011	7	1,344	0.01%	0.404%
2015	8	1,761	0.01%	0.362%
2019	17	4,407	0.02%	0.436%
2021	10	2,546	0.01%	0.475%
2025	7	1,299	0.007%	0.324%

== See also ==
- List of animal advocacy parties
- List of political parties in Canada
