= Double genocide theory (Rwanda) =

Theory of "counter-genocide" against Hutus

The double genocide theory posits that, during the Rwandan genocide, the Tutsi-led Rwandan Patriotic Front (RPF) engaged in a "counter-genocide" against the Hutus. Most scholars of Rwanda, such as Scott Straus and Gerald Caplan, say that RPF violence against Hutus does not fully match the definition of "genocide", considering that it instead consisted of war crimes or crimes against humanity.

== Examples ==
Black Furies, White Liars, a book by French investigative journalist Pierre Péan, accuses the RPF of genocide against Hutus. Jean-Pierre Chrétien, a French historian, criticized Péan's "amazing revisionist passion". A 2003 study by Philip Verwimp, based on 8 months of field research in central and southern Rwanda over a period of 2 years, found that the absolute number of Tutsis killed was double that for Hutus, and that the patterns of killing for the two groups differed. Verwimp acknowledged that his study was only a partial test of the double-genocide thesis as it excluded the prefectures where most RPF killings were purportedly committed, yet concluded by arguing that "for those prefectures in which we performed our fieldwork, the term genocide should be reserved for the killings committed by the Interahamwe and the FAR, and another word should be used for the killings committed by the RPF. That word could be massacre or terror or another word, depending on the event."

A great deal of effort has been extended to make sure the focus stays exclusively on the Francophone Tutsi victims and their Hutu executioners. But of the estimated one million people killed, between 300,000 and 500,000 of them were Tutsi, according to best estimates. What about the other 500,000 to 700,000 people? Who is responsible for their deaths?

— Christian Davenport
Professor of Peace Studies at the University of Michigan

In 2009, scholars Christian Davenport of the University of Michigan and Allan C. Stam of Dartmouth College argued that the anti-Tutsi genocide constituted only part of the slaughter of spring and summer 1994; that the RPF was "clearly responsible" for another major portion of the killings; that the victims were "fairly evenly distributed between Tutsi and Hutu"; that the majority of the dead were Hutu, rather than Tutsi; and that, "among other things, it appears that there simply weren't enough Tutsi in Rwanda at the time to account for all the reported deaths".

In October 2014, a BBC documentary, Rwanda: The Untold Story, was aired featuring interviews with Davenport and Stam. It suggested that Kagame's RPF was involved in the shooting down of Habyarimana's plane. It aroused considerable controversy. Following this, the Rwandan government banned the BBC's Kinyarwanda-language radio broadcasts from the country before conducting a three-week inquiry into the documentary.

In 2018, the Canadian journalist Judi Rever released a book titled In Praise of Blood. Based on interviews with RPF defectors and top-secret documents that were leaked from the ICTR, Rever argued that ethnically targeted killings of Hutus by the RPF, beginning in 1990 in Rwanda and in 1996 in Zaire, should also be called "genocide." Scholars had mixed reactions to Rever's description of these killings as "genocide." René Lemarchand called the book a "path-breaking inquest", "destined to become required reading for any one claiming competence on the Rwanda genocide". Political scientist Scott Straus was critical, writing that in his opinion the evidence showed that the RPF killings of Hutu civilians constituted crimes against humanity, but not a double genocide. Similarly, Gerald Caplan said that RPF had committed "war crimes" against Hutus but those crimes did not meet the definition of genocide.

== See also ==
- Double genocide theory – Equation of Soviet atrocities against Eastern Europeans to the Holocaust

== Sources ==
- Beloff, Jonathan R. (2022). ""Double Genocide" or Revenge Killings? Did the Liberators of a Genocide Commit Their Own?". In the Shadow of Genocide. Routledge. ISBN 978-1-003-22859-2.
- Caplan, Gerald (2018). "Rethinking the Rwandan Narrative for the 25th Anniversary". Genocide Studies International. 12 (2): 152–190. doi:10.3138/gsi.12.2.03. S2CID 167056377.
- Rever, Judi (2018). In Praise of Blood. Random House of Canada. ISBN 978-0345812117.
- Straus, Scott (6 June 2019). "The Limits of a Genocide Lens: Violence Against Rwandans in the 1990s". Journal of Genocide Research. 21 (4): 504–524. doi:10.1080/14623528.2019.1623527. ISSN 1462-3528. S2CID 196571351.
- Verwimp, Philip (2003). "Testing the Double-Genocide Thesis for Central and Southern Rwanda". The Journal of Conflict Resolution. 47 (4): 423–42. doi:10.1177/0022002703254478. JSTOR 3176203. S2CID 67832644.
