= Rwandan genocide denial =

Rwandan genocide denial is the pseudohistorical assertion that the Rwandan genocide did not occur, specifically rejection of the scholarly consensus that Rwandan Tutsis were the victims of genocide between 7 April and 19 July 1994. The perpetrators, a small minority of other Hutu, and some fringe Western writers dispute that reality.

Aspects of the genocide, such as the death toll, prior planning of the genocide, responsibility for the assassination of Juvénal Habyarimana that triggered the genocide, war crimes (considered a second genocide by some) by the Rwandan Patriotic Front (RPF), and whether the International Criminal Tribunal for Rwanda should have tried RPF leaders continues to be debated by scholars. The Tutsi death toll in the genocide as well as the number of Hutu perpetrators (to the point of collective guilt) is inflated by the RPF government compared to estimates by scholars. People with views that differ from the government position may be accused of genocide denial, even if they accept that Tutsi were the victims of genocide.

Denial of the Rwandan genocide is a crime in Rwanda, with laws against "genocide ideology" and "divisionism" used to target those who disagree with the government's official version of history and other critics of the government. Such laws have been accused of infringement on freedom of speech.

== Denial by officials ==
A high-ranking Tutsi and a UN official have claimed that no genocide of the Tutsi took place at all: Antoine Nyetera, who claims Tutsi royal origins, and the former UN Representative in Rwanda, Jacques-Roger Booh-Booh, who declared that "to claim that a genocide occurred is closer to the politics of surrealism than to the truth".

== United States ==
During the 1994 Genocide against the Tutsi in Rwanda, US officials under the Clinton administration were instructed not to refer to it as genocide, but instead say that "acts of genocide may have occurred." As early as April 1994, the government had internally referred it as genocide, but they did not publicly refer to it as such until June. On a visit to Kigali, in 1998, Clinton apologized for not referring to it as genocide, and for not sending aid to Rwanda.

== Peter Erlinder ==
American lawyer Peter Erlinder, who was Lead Defence Counsel for the UN International Criminal Tribunal for Rwanda, questions the planning of the killing and concludes that the slaughter of the Tutsi should not be called genocide.

== Fiona Fox ==
In 1995, Living Marxism published an article by Fiona Fox disputing the reality of the genocide:

The lesson I would draw from my visit is that we must reject the term 'genocide' in Rwanda. It has been used inside and outside Rwanda to criminalise the majority of ordinary Rwandan people, to justify outside interference in the country's affairs, and to lend legitimacy to a minority military government imposed on Rwanda by Western powers.

== Edward S. Herman and David Peterson ==
In The Politics of Genocide (2010), writers Edward S. Herman and David Peterson, while not denying the scale of the killing during the period of extreme violence of April–July 1994, questioned the distribution of the victims for those months, arguing that Hutus comprised the majority of the dead, not Tutsis. Their detractors have charged them with genocide denial, accusations that have been rejected by Herman and Peterson.

Their book goes much further than others who have questioned the consensus view of the genocide; it states that common knowledge is not simply partly incorrect, but is actually "a propaganda line ... that turned perpetrator and victim upside-down." The two men are critical of fundamental aspects of the Human Rights Watch report by Alison Des Forges, and maintain that she obfuscates the issue of who assassinated Habyarimana (they argue it was clearly the RPF) and that, contrary to the conclusions of Des Forges's report, the only well-planned regimen of massive violence perpetrated after the assassination was the RPF's invasion to drive the Hutu from power. Herman and Peterson ultimately conclude that the RPF were "prime génocidaires", while the Interahamwe were "the RPF's actual victims."

Their book argues that the accepted version of the events of 1994 implies Rwanda is "the first case in history in which a minority population, suffering destruction at the hands of its tormentors, drove its tormentors from power and assumed control of a country, all in the span of less than one hundred days", a narrative Herman and Peterson deem "incredible in the extreme."

Africa specialist Gerald Caplan criticized Herman and Peterson's account, charging that "why the Hutu members of the government 'couldn't possibly have planned a genocide against the Tutsi' is never remotely explained". Herman and Peterson's position on the genocide was found "deplorable" by James Wizeye, first secretary at the Rwandan High Commission in London. Adam Jones has compared Herman and Peterson's approach to Holocaust denial.

== Rwanda: The Untold Story ==
In 2014, the BBC aired the documentary Rwanda: The Untold Story, which questioned the accepted historical account and included interviews with American researchers Christian Davenport and Allan C. Stam who, while not denying that a genocide took place, nevertheless state that the majority of the victims may have been Hutus. Afterwards, Rwanda's parliament approved a resolution to ban the BBC in the country.
