= In Praise of Blood =

2018 non-fiction book by Judi Rever

In Praise of Blood: The Crimes of the Rwandan Patriotic Front
- Author: Judi Rever
- Publisher: Random House of Canada
- Publication date: March 2018
- ISBN: 978-0-345-81210-0

In Praise of Blood: The Crimes of the Rwandan Patriotic Front is a 2018 non-fiction book by Canadian journalist Judi Rever and published by Random House of Canada; it has also been translated into Dutch and French. The book describes alleged war crimes by the Rwandan Patriotic Front (RPF), Rwanda's ruling political party, during its ascent to power in the 1990s.

Although many of the events described in Rever's book were already known to historians, the book is controversial. Praised for thorough investigation at considerable personal risk to the author, the book was also criticized for sensationalism and relying on unreliable sources. According to historian Gerald Caplan, the book "had an immediate, destabilizing influence on the world of orthodox Rwandan scholarship". Rever argues that, in addition to the Rwandan genocide by Hutus against Tutsis, the war crimes against Hutus by the Tutsi-led RPF should also be labeled "genocide", an opinion that differed from existing historical narratives.

== Background ==
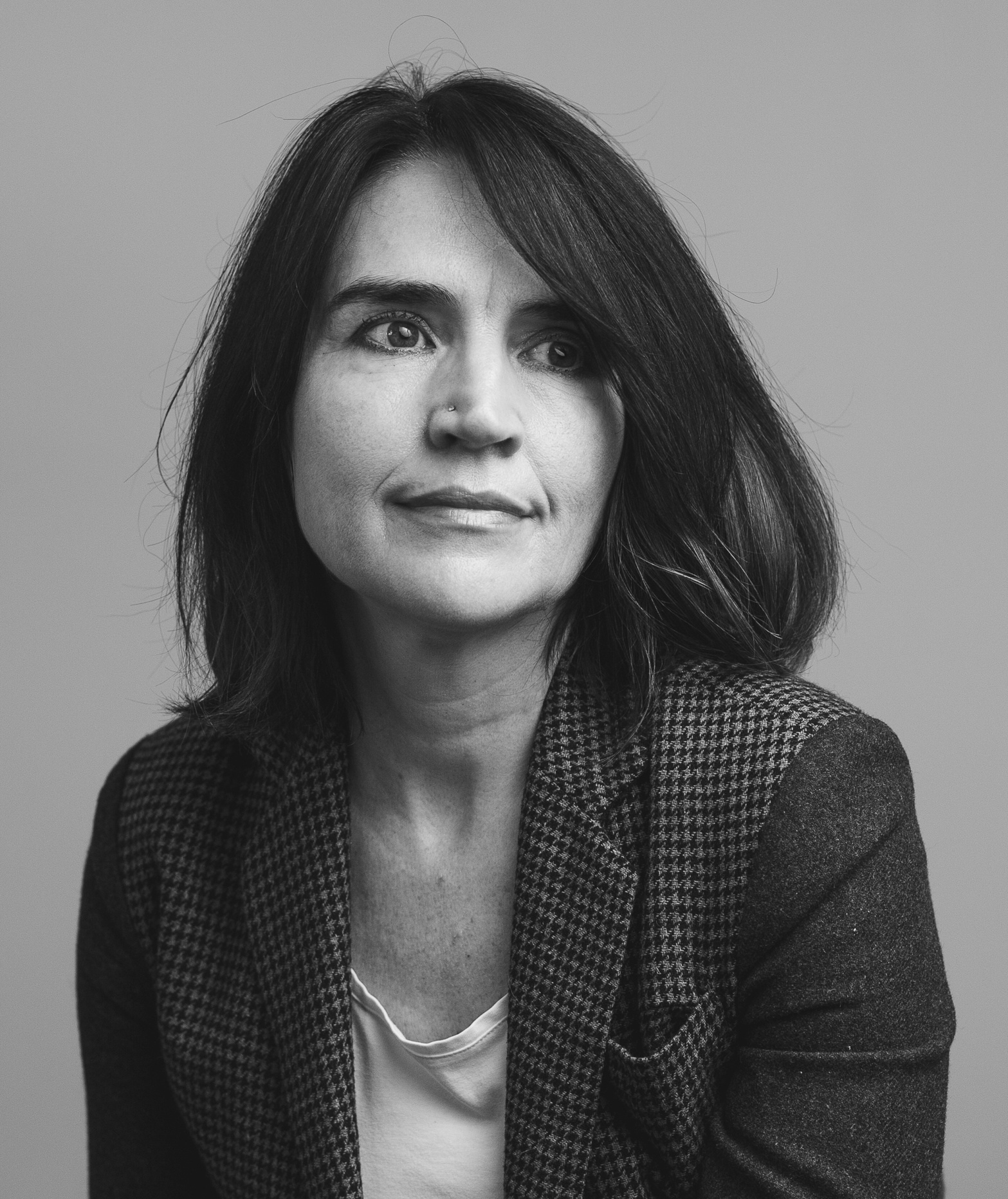
Judi Rever

In Rwanda, the two major ethnic groups are Hutu (85%) and Tutsi (14%). European colonial policies promoted and racialized the higher status of cattle-raising Tutsis over farming Hutus. European policies, including their support for a Tutsi monarchy, increased tension between the two groups. In the 1959 Rwandan Revolution, a Hutu-led movement killed many Rwandan Tutsis and drove hundreds of thousands into exile.

Descendants of Rwandan Tutsis whose families had fled to Uganda gave armed support to a rebellion by Yoweri Museveni. Then in 1990, their Tutsi-led political and military force, Rwandan Patriotic Front (RPF), challenged the Hutu-led government of Rwanda, setting off the Rwandan Civil War.

Judi Rever is a Canadian journalist who has covered African affairs since the refugee crisis of the First Congo War, which she covered for Radio France Internationale. A three year stint as correspondent for Agence France Press (AFP) in Ivory Coast followed. Her work has also appeared in Le Monde, Le Monde Diplomatique, The Globe and Mail and elsewhere. She contributed the foreword to Victoire Ingabire Umuhoza's 2017 book Between 4 Walls of the 1930 Prison: Memoirs of Rwandan Prisoner of Conscience. In the book, Rever describes threats against herself and her family, some of which were reported in 2015 news stories documenting threats against Rever and four other Canadian critics of Paul Kagame.

== Content ==
Canada has given roughly $550 million to Rwanda since 1994 including $30 million in 2016. Why does it keep sending money to a government that is strongly suspected of murdering two Canadian citizens?
It seemed that the RPF could now commit crimes out in the open and still receive billions of dollars in aid. What were these Western allies supporting? From the point of view of the RPF’s victims, it all seemed to be in praise of blood, an endorsement of mass murder.

— Judi Rever

In Praise of Blood follows the timeline of a Canadian reporter who in 1997 stumbled on a big "story" about the RPF and later pursued it. The book describes events in Rwanda and Zaire (later the DRC) that according to Rever's sources were crimes committed by the RPF during the rise to power of Kagame, now Rwanda's president. The book discusses several periods during which these events took place: the Rwandan civil war including the 1994 Rwandan genocide (1990–1994); the counterinsurgency period in Rwanda (1994–1997); RPF participation in two Congo wars (First and Second); and more recently, deaths of Rwanda dissidents. RPF massacres of Hutu civilians described in the book include Byumba, Kibeho, Karambi, Gabiro, Gikongoro.

The book's fifteen chapters follow the sequence of Rever's research, beginning when Rever was a young reporter traveling with humanitarian workers into the Congolese jungle to cover the refugee crisis there, and tracing her later research parallel to events in her life, including her marriage and raising two daughters. Each chapter centers around one event, presented (according to Rever) as a cinematic scene.

=== Origins of the project ===
Chapters 1 and 2 cover 1997, beginning when Rever accompanied humanitarian aid workers into the jungles of Zaire. After meeting women and children who said they were Hutu refugees being hunted by RPF troops from Rwanda, Rever wonders why western countries did not step in to stop the violence. Based on her research, Rever concludes that western countries were less interested in helping refugees than in keeping the good will of Rwanda's new RPF government—first to get rid of Mobutu and later to exploit the Congo's resources.

In Chapters 3 and 4, Rever decides to spend time away from Rwanda with her husband and starts raising a family. In 2010, after she has the opportunity to interview war-crimes prosecutor Luc Côté about the recently leaked "UN mapping report" (a report on war crimes in the DRC), she resumes writing about Africa. The book then briefly catalogs some other RPF-related events that took place between 1998 and 2010, including French arrest warrants (2006), the Second Congo War (which Rever describes as a "looter's war"), and the Gersony report (leaked in 2010).

=== Full-time investigation after 2012 ===
From 2012 onwards Rever devotes her career to a full-time investigation of RPF war crimes. Much of Chapter 4 recounts stories from Théogène Murwanashyaka (TM), a former RPF army officer who reached out to her in 2012 and became a major informant of her book. Unlike the RPF leadership, whose Tutsi families had fled Hutu rule to settle in Uganda, TM's family were what he called "interior Tutsis" – Tutsi families who had remained in Rwanda. TM came to believe that during the genocide "the RPF had sacrificed interior Tutsis" as a cost of gaining power. Both TM and Belgian UNAMIR commander Luc Marchal, whom Rever interviewed, assert that the RPF could have done much to slow or stop the massacre of Tutsis by Hutus, but were more concerned with seizing power. According to Marchal, the goal was "to seize power and use the massacres as stock in trade to justify the military operations."

Each of chapters 5 through 9 covers a different aspect of RPF actions during the Rwandan Civil War. Chapter 5 describes the RPF's use of military intelligence to destabilize the Habyarimana government and undermine the Arusha Peace Agreement. According to ICTR, these intelligence groups were responsible for most of the massacres of Hutu civilians attributed to the RPF. They successfully infiltrated Hutu political parties and the extremist militia during the early 1990s. Citing ICTR testimony, the book says that before and during the genocide, RPF members who had infiltrated Hutu militia fueled the genocidal violence, including helping to kill Tutsi civilians at roadblocks.

Chapters 6 through 10 describe alleged massacres of Hutus committed inside Rwanda by the RPF. Chapter 6, based largely on ICTR information, describes a 1994 massacre of Hutu peasants in Byumba's football stadium. Chapter 7, based largely on interviews, describes massacres of Hutus by RPF that allegedly occurred in Byumba's Karambi Trading Center, Murambi, and near Akagera National Park, where, according to Rever's informants, dead Hutus were concealed from satellite photography by being first burned and then buried. In Chapters 8 and 9, the book describes events at Giti, where the RPF allegedly massacred Hutus but then created a cover story about what happened. Rever also describes the participation of some non-RPF Tutsis in killing their Hutu neighbors, saying, "In 1994, Rwanda was awash in fear, mistrust, and paranoia." Chapter 10 describes alleged RPF killings of Hutus inside Rwanda in 1996–1997, justified as "counterinsurgency" against Hutu genocidaires.

Chapters 11 and 12 deal with the International Criminal Tribunal for Rwanda (ICTR), an international court established by the United Nations Security Council to judge people responsible for the Rwandan genocide and other serious violations of international law during 1994. In addition to its work identifying Hutu génocidaires who had committed war crimes against Tutsi, the ICTR gathered evidence of crimes by high-level RPF officers, but was then forbidden to indict RPF suspects. Instead, the ICTR was pressured by the US and the UN to hand over to Rwanda its evidence concerning RPF crimes. As a result, Rwanda prosecuted only two low-level soldiers for the killing on June 5, 1994 of several Hutu Catholic priests and a small child.

Chapter 13 presents the theory that the RPF, not Hutu extremists, shot down President Habyarimana's plane on 6 April 1994, using the ensuing chaos and mass killings to generate sympathy for its military campaign to seize power.

In Chapter 14 "Becoming a target", Rever describes threats against her safety and her family as she continues to publish articles criticizing the RPF. In 2015, she determines to fight back, by going to the press about the threats and by finishing the book.

=== Conclusions ===
Chapter 15 surveys a range of charges against the RPF beginning in 1991 and continuing to the 2019 conviction of Bosco Ntaganda for eighteen charges that included rape, murder, recruitment of child soldiers and sexual slavery of civilians. Rever criticizes many early reports from the 1990s as neglecting or even justifying deaths of Hutu civilians. Western nations, valuing Kagame's achievements as leader of Rwanda, remain donors and supporters despite the RPF's record on human rights.

The book's conclusion stresses that bad actions by the RPF do not in any way justify or diminish the horror of the Rwanda genocide against Tutsis, saying:

There is no part of this book that denies the genocide...There is no question that after Habyarimana's death, the [Hutu] hardliners chose genocide...But this book is not an examination of the dynamics of that 1994 genocide of Tutsis.

But she says that RPF "policy of ethnic murder" against Hutus should be considered a genocide as well.

Her final message is that Rwanda cannot have true reconciliation as long as its government enforces secrecy about crimes committed by the RPF. While suspects of the genocide against the Tutsi were tried and convicted by the ICTR, the crimes committed by the RPF have been left unpunished.

== Publishing history ==
The book was published by Random House of Canada in March 2018. and in Dutch by Amsterdam University Press in 2018. A French translation of the book was originally to be published by Fayard in 2019, but this company withdrew after controversy. Subsequently Max Milo published it in 2020 as Rwanda: L’éloge du sang (Rwanda: In Praise of Blood).

== Reception ==
=== Mainstream reviewers ===
In Rever's native Canada, the book's launch got attention, and Rever became a frequent interview subject, both on the book's contents and on her methods for writing it. Both The Globe and Mail and the Toronto Star published book excerpts.

One of the book's earliest reviews came in the LA Review of Books, "The Insistence of Memory," where political scientist Kate Cronin-Furman described the Rwandan government's use of memorial events "to remind Rwandans and the world that the Tutsi are never safe and that whatever the Kagame regime does is necessary for their protection"; in this context, she called In Praise of Blood "explosive."

Helen Epstein, whose favorable two-part review for The New York Review of Books may have helped popularize the book, wrote that Rever's "sources are too numerous and their observations too consistent for her findings to be a fabrication." Epstein predicted, however, that the book would provoke significant pushback:

Versions of Rever’s story have been told by others. While all contain convincing evidence against the RPF, some are marred by a tendency to understate the crimes of the Hutu génocidaires or overstate the RPF’s crimes. But some, including the work of Filip Reyntjens, a Belgian professor of law and politics, have been both measured and soundly researched. Kagame’s regime and its defenders have dismissed them all as propaganda spouted by defeated Hutu génocidaires and genocide deniers.

Science journalist Laurie Garrett, in a Lancet article sharply critical of Rwanda's leadership, called In Praise of Blood "expertly crafted, riveting, though often gruesome," calling it "excellent" both as journalism and as creative writing. Similarly human rights scholar Jeff Bachman" called the book "investigative journalism at its finest," considering it "the most in-depth account yet of suspected crimes committed by Paul Kagame and the Rwandan Patriotic Front".

Agnes Binagwaho and two other Rwanda-based academics criticized both Garrett's Lancet review and In Praise of Blood, saying that the book "propagates inaccuracies about the catalysing event of the 100 days of genocide against the Tutsis, blames the victims, and does not accurately discuss the rebuilding and reconciliation that has since occurred in Rwanda."

Le Soir journalist Colette Braeckman praised Rever for her on-the-ground investigation but criticized the book for examining only one side of the coin—saying that, for example, it fails to note that the women and children refugees Rever met in Zaire could have been "human shields" for armed génocidaires. Braeckman also faulted the book for ignoring decades of anti-Tutsi racism when explaining the genocide and the RPF's actions.

=== Scholarly ===
Political scientist René Lemarchand called the book a "path-breaking inquest", "destined to become required reading for any one claiming competence on the Rwanda genocide". He praised Rever for thorough investigation and taking risks in order to gather as much information as possible. Scholar Filip Reyntjens said that the book fleshes out in "blood curdling detail" RPF violence that was already known in a general way.

Historian Gerald Caplan criticized the book for "...too many unnamed informants; too many confidential, unavailable leaked documents; too much unexamined credulity about some of the accusations; too little corroboration from foreigners who were eyewitnesses to history." Both Caplan and Linda Melvern found it concerning that the book's acknowledgments included alleged genocide-deniers. Nevertheless, Caplan concluded "...Rever has reinforced the case against the RPF that had already been made and that left little doubt that the RPF under President Kagame is indeed guilty of war crimes, though not of genocide....I believe we all have an obligation to make this record better-known...

Political scientist Timothy Longman said that Rever's book was "sensationalistic" and "provides only limited new information about RPF abuses within Rwanda", although elaborating on some cases described earlier by Alison Des Forges. Longman contends that "No academic has yet written a well-researched and detailed account of RPF violence, most likely because doing the necessary research would be both prohibitively difficult and extremely dangerous".

=== Genocide ===
Linda Melvern criticized In Praise of Blood as "a sensationalist book," singling out for criticism material related to the 1994 genocide against Tutsis, particularly what she called "the noxious claim" that RPF commandos "infiltrated Hutu militia and 'assisted directly in killing Tutsi at roadblocks.'"

Claudine Vidal wrote that "Rever's work blurs the line between investigation and indictment," pushing toward a declaration that there was a second "genocide," but with Hutu victims. According to Vidal, "Journalists and social scientists should be calling for investigations equivalent to those carried out into the Tutsi genocide, rather than .. trying to apply a particular legal classification" Filip Reyntjens, responding to Vidal, gave his impression that the book's claim of "genocide" came from Rever's process of uncovering evidence, and was not the book's original or motivating argument.

Political scientist Scott Straus, like Vidal, criticized the book for accusing the RPF of "genocide," while (also like Vidal) recognizing "the mass violence committed against Hutu populations in the 1990–1999 period." Straus called In Praise for Blood "irresponsible" and stated that Rever's "title is unnecessarily provocative, her tone breathless and conspiratorial."

Yash Tandon criticized In Praise of Blood for overlooking the historical roots of the genocide against Tutsis. He questioned the book's "accusative approach" toward the RPF as a useful way forward in Hutu-Tutsi reconciliation efforts.

Researchers Helen Hintjens and Jos van Oijen contested the likelihood that the RPF had concealed their killings of Hutus by cremating tens or hundreds of thousands of victims in Akagera National Park. Specialists they consulted, including the Netherlands Forensic Institute, concluded that the methods described by Rever "would certainly have left significant traces of mass murder," while two foreign observers saw no signs of "death camps" near the Gabiro army barracks.

Researchers Bert Ingelaere and Marijke Verpoorten criticized the book as suggesting that "there in fact were two genocides happening at the time: one against the Tutsi, and one committed by Tutsi fighters and civilians against the Hutu." Citing their own research into inter-ethnic trust in Rwanda, they asserted that "If there had been a double genocide, one would expect to see Hutu levels of trust towards Tutsis to reach the same depths as those of Tutsi towards Hutu."

In 2019, a group of sixty researchers and eye-witnesses including Romeo Dallaire published an open letter to complain that Belgian universities invited Rever to give talks about her book without providing any rebuttal viewpoints, giving the impression that they supported her theories. In August, 2020, several organizations including Ibuka published an open letter to reproach Max Milo for publishing a French translation of the book, saying that it negated the Rwandan genocide by blaming Tutsis for the deaths of other Tutsis.

Rever says she is not a genocide denier because she accepts that the killing of Tutsi was indeed a genocide, but she is a "revisionist" because she questions existing historical narratives.

=== Death toll ===
Estimates of Hutu deaths from mass violence in the 1990s are much less precise than Tutsi death figures from the Rwandan genocide due to the greater timescale and geographic spread of the killings. Researcher Alison Des Forges estimated that the RPF killed 60,000 people in war crimes in 1994 and 1995. Historian Gérard Prunier estimated that 100,000 Hutu were killed by the RPF in 1994–1995. Historian Roland Tissot argued that there were around 400,000 Hutus killed by the RPF between 1994 and 1998 (excluding disease and excess mortality), while Omar Shahabudin McDoom estimated several hundred thousand Hutu victims during the 1990s. Demographer Marijke Verpoorten guesstimates 542,000 deaths of Rwandan Hutus (about 7.5 percent of the population), with "a very large uncertainty interval", from war-related causes in the 1990s, including battle deaths and excess mortality from poor conditions in refugee camps.

== Awards ==
The Quebec Writers' Federation awarded IPOB its 2018 Mavis Gallant Prize for Non-Fiction, calling it "heartbreaking, chilling and necessary." The book also won the Ontario Historical Society's 2018 Huguenot Society of Canada Award. This award is given for bringing "public awareness to the principles of freedom of conscience and freedom of thought." It was a finalist for the Hilary Weston Writers' Trust Prize for Nonfiction. The jury's citation called In Praise of Blood "an undeniably important story told by a remarkably brave writer." Canada's The Globe and Mail listed In Praise of Blood in its 2018 top-100 list of favourite books. The Hong Kong Free Press named the book of its "Ten Best Human Rights Books of 2018," but said the book should be "in the running for bad cover of the year: not only does the cover have nothing to do with its subject, it is part of that old tradition of equating Africa with big wild animals."

== Sources ==
- Caplan, Gerald (2018). "Rethinking the Rwandan Narrative for the 25th Anniversary". Genocide Studies International. 12 (2): 152–190. doi:10.3138/gsi.12.2.03.
- Rever, Judi (2018). In Praise of Blood: The Crimes of the Rwandan Patriotic Front. Random House of Canada. ISBN 978-0-345-81210-0.
