= Verpoorten (surname) =

Verpoorten is a surname. Notable people with the surname include:

- John Verpoorten (1940–1977), American comic book artist
- Marijke Verpoorten, Dutch researcher
- Peter Verpoorten, Flemish sculptor.
