= Joy Mukanyange =

Rwandan diplomat and activist

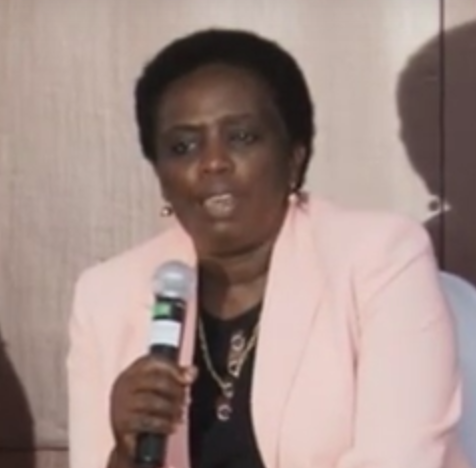
- At a conference in 2013

Personal details
- Born: 1950s Gikongoro Province, Rwanda-Urundi
- Party: Rwanda Patriotic Front
- Education: Makerere University
- Occupation: Ambassador and activist

Joy Mukanyange is a Rwandan diplomat and activist. She has served as an ambassador to Tanzania and later to Kenya.

== Life ==
Joy Mukanyange was born in Gikongoro, Rwanda. Following attacks on the Tutsi in Rwanda her family fled in 1959 to a refugee camp in Uganda. She was brought up in southern Uganda. She went to Makerere University in Uganda graduating with distinction in Literature. During the 1980s she lived in Nairobi, Kenya, where she was the Secretary of the Nyampinga Association that cared for Rwandan refugees in Kenya.

After the Rwandan genocide, she became Rwanda's Ambassador to Tanzania and she was the Rwandan official who attended the sentencing of her former prime minister in September 1998. She thought if fair the Jean Kambanda received a life sentence and noted that Rwanda was "not looking for revenge".

In 1999 she became Rwanda's Ambassador to Kenya which she held until 2002. Mukanyange was her country's permanent representative to the UNEP and UNCHS.

In 2014 she reported on the good progress that her country had made with regard to improving gender equality. This was in her role as spokesperson for a consultancy based in Kigali. Rwanda's government is made up of a 64% majority of women, although this proportion is basically reversed in the cabinet. 50% of the judiciary are women although only 30% in the Gacaca courts. 98% of Rwandan women get antenatal care and girls enrolment in schools exceeds boys and both are up - to over 95%.
