= Rever =

Rever may refer to:

- Réver Humberto Alves Araújo (born 1985), Brazilian football player
- "Rêver", song by Mylène Farmer
- Rever, in clothing construction, a type of collar or lapel made from the same piece of fabric as the rest of the garment.
- Judi Rever, Canadian journalist and author of In Praise of Blood
- "Rever", song by Bicep from their 2021 album Isles
- Rever, an album by Larsen released on Young God Records
