= Craig Scott (politician) =

Canadian politician (born 1962)

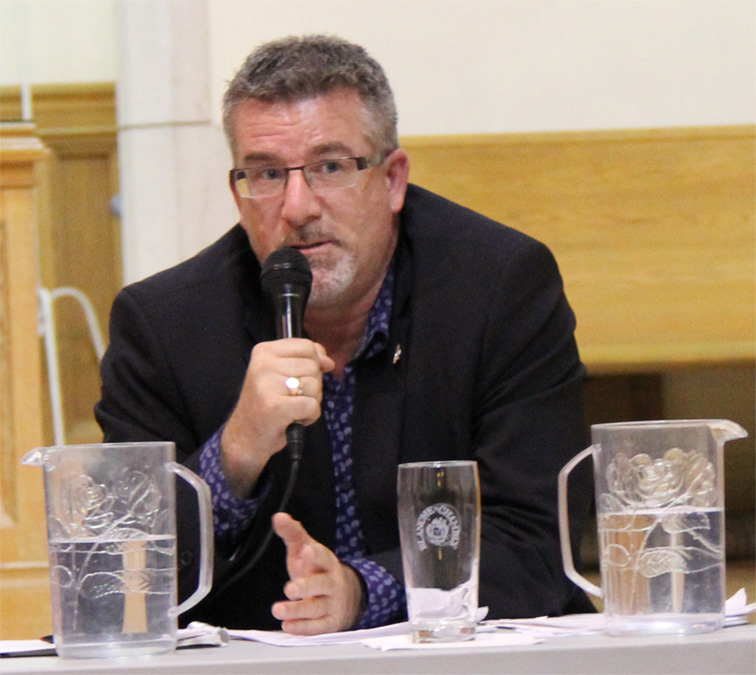
- Scott in 2013

Member of the Canadian Parliament for Toronto—Danforth
- In office March 19, 2012 – October 19, 2015
- Preceded by: Jack Layton (2011)
- Succeeded by: Julie Dabrusin

Personal details
- Born: March 14, 1962 (age 64) Windsor, Nova Scotia, Canada
- Party: New Democratic
- Domestic partner: Kovit Ratchadasri
- Education: McGill University; University of Oxford; London School of Economics; Dalhousie University
- Occupation: Legal scholar

Craig M. Scott (born March 14, 1962) is a Canadian politician and academic. He was elected as the New Democratic Party (NDP) candidate in a federal by-election in Toronto—Danforth on March 19, 2012, and served as the riding's Member of Parliament (MP) until his defeat in the 2015 federal election. He taught at University of Toronto Faculty of Law and Osgoode Hall Law School prior to entering politics.

== Background ==
Born and raised in Windsor, Nova Scotia, Scott moved to Vancouver Island at age 17 to attend the Lester B. Pearson United World College of the Pacific, gaining the International Baccalaureate Diploma in 1981. He then studied political science at McGill University, graduating with a bachelor of arts (BA) degree in 1984. He proceeded to earn a BA in jurisprudence in 1986 from the University of Oxford, where he was a Rhodes Scholar at St John's College. He also has a Masters of Law from the London School of Economics (1987) and a Bachelor of Laws from Dalhousie University (1988). His academic specialty is international law with a focus on human rights law.

From 2005 to 2011, Scott and his partner Kovit Ratchadasri owned the Craig Scott Gallery, an art gallery on Berkeley Street near Toronto's Distillery District.

== Academic and legal career ==
He served as law clerk to the Chief Justice of Canada Brian Dickson from 1988 to 1989, then joined the University of Toronto Faculty of Law as assistant professor, becoming tenured as associate professor in 1994. In 2000 he joined the faculty at Osgoode Hall Law School, and served as associate dean from 2001 to 2004. He was also a director of the Jack and Mae Nathanson Centre on Transnational Human Rights, Crime and Security.

Scott was an advisor to the African National Congress while it was in exile during the Apartheid era, and subsequently assisted in drafting portions of the post-apartheid Constitution of South Africa. In 1993-1994, he served as co-counsel for the government of Bosnia and Herzegovina before the International Court of Justice in Bosnia and Herzegovina v. Serbia and Montenegro, regarding the imposition of an arms embargo by the United Nations Security Council. He was involved with the Truth Commission held in the aftermath of the 2009 Honduran coup d'état, as well as human rights issues relating to Iraq and Sri Lanka. He also advised rights seeking groups in Canada in regards to legal challenges using the Charter of Rights and Freedoms and assisted Maher Arar in his lawsuit against the Canadian government.

== Political career ==
Following the death of NDP leader and Toronto—Danforth MP Jack Layton in August 2011, Scott was selected as the party's candidate on January 9, 2012 to run in the riding's by-election. He won the seat on March 19, 2012 with 59% of the vote, despite a strong campaign by second-place Liberal finisher Grant Gordon. He served in the 41st Parliament as opposition critic on democratic reform and parliamentary reform, member of the Standing Committee on Procedure and House Affairs, and member of the Standing Committee on Justice and Human Rights.

Scott ran for re-election in 2015, but was defeated by Liberal Julie Dabrusin amid the massive Liberal wave that swept through Toronto.

== Electoral record ==
2015 Canadian federal election
Party	Candidate	Votes	%	±%	Expenditures
Liberal	Julie Dabrusin	23,531	42.34	+24.75	–
New Democratic	Craig Scott	22,325	40.17	-20.70	–
Conservative	Benjamin Dichter	5,478	9.86	-4.44	–
Green	Chris Tolley	2,618	4.71	-1.74	–
Progressive Canadian	John Richardson	1,275	2.29		–
Animal Alliance	Elizabeth Abbott	354	0.64	–	–
Total valid votes/Expense limit		55,581	100.00		$209,972.56
Total rejected ballots		269	0.48	–	
Turnout		55,850	72.38	–	
Eligible voters		77,158			
Liberal gain from New Democratic		Swing		+22.73	
Source: Elections Canada

Canadian federal by-election, March 19, 2012: Toronto—Danforth Death of Jack Layton
Party	Candidate	Votes	%	±%	Expenditures
New Democratic	Craig Scott	19,210	59.44	−1.36	$ 82,847.22
Liberal	Grant Gordon	9,215	28.51	+10.89	86,016.54
Conservative	Andrew Keyes	1,736	5.37	−8.95	73,735.56
Green	Adriana Mugnatto-Hamu	1,517	4.69	−1.77	57,955.38
Progressive Canadian	Dorian Baxter	208	0.64	–	1,473.73
Libertarian	John C. Recker	133	0.41	–	2,433.05
Independent	Leslie Bory	77	0.24	–	898.69
Canadian Action	Christopher Porter	75	0.23	–	3,163.57
Independent	John Turmel	57	0.18	–	–
United	Brian Jedan	55	0.17	–	130.18
Independent	Bahman Yazdanfar	36	0.11	–	622.86
Total valid votes/expense limit		32,319	100.00		$ 86,821.95
Total rejected ballots		150	0.46	−0.13	
Turnout		32,469	43.58	−21.32	
New Democratic hold		Swing		−6.13	
Source(s) "By-election March 19, 2012 – Official Voting Results". Elections Canada. "Financial Reports: Candidate's Electoral Campaign Return – March 19, 2012 By-election".
