= Massacres of Hutus in the First Congo War =

1996–1997 genocidal massacres

Massacres of Hutus during the First Congo War
- Part of the First Congo War
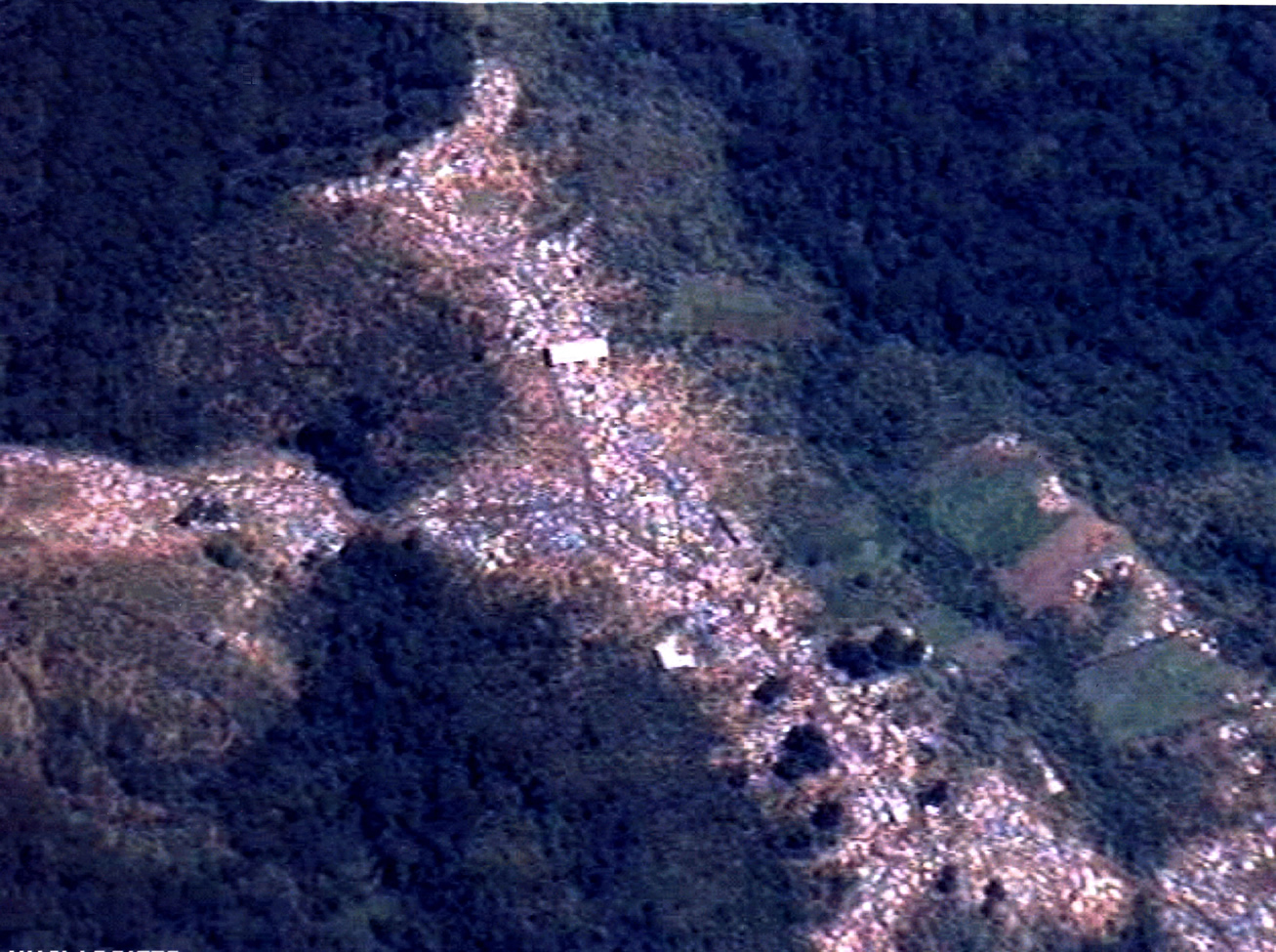
- Aerial photograph of the Mihanda refugee camp
- Location: Kivu, Zaire
- Date: October 1996 to May 1997
- Target: Hutu refugees and Interahamwe
- Attack type: Genocidal massacres
- Deaths: 200,000–233,000
- Perpetrators: Alliance des Forces Démocratiques pour la Libération du Congo-Zaïre; Rwandan Patriotic Army
- Motive: Revenge for the Rwandan genocide Hutuphobia

During the First Congo War, Rwandan, Congolese, and Burundian Hutu men, women, and children in villages and refugee camps were hunted down and became victims of mass killings in eastern Zaire (now named the Democratic Republic of the Congo).

== Background ==
In October 1996, during the First Congo War, troops of the Rwanda-backed Alliance des Forces Démocratiques pour la Libération du Congo-Zaïre (AFDL) attacked refugee camps in Eastern DRC, home to 527,000 and 718,000 Hutu refugees in South-Kivu and North-Kivu respectively. Elements of the AFDL and, more so, of the Rwandan Patriotic Army (RPA) systematically shelled numerous camps and committed massacres with light weapons. These early attacks cost the lives of 6,800–8,000 refugees and forced the repatriation of 500,000–700,000 refugees back to Rwanda.

As survivors fled westward of the DRC, the AFDL units hunted them down and attacked their makeshift camps, killing thousands more. These attacks and killings continued to intensify as refugees moved westward as far as 1,800 km away. The report of the United Nations Joint Commission reported 134 sites where such atrocities were committed. On 8 July 1997, the acting UN High Commissioner for Human Rights stated that "about 200,000 Hutu refugees could well have been massacred".

== Persecution and crackdown ==
According to Roberto Garretón, UN Special Rapporteur on the situation of human rights in Congo, "The tactic [consisted] of laying siege to camps before attacking them, [...] summoning the inhabitants of predominantly Hutu towns to meetings in schools or churches, so as to massacre them; issuing appeals over the official radio stations urging all those hiding in the forests to come out for medical care and food aid, so as to murder them; and hampering or opposing humanitarian operations in the camps". Human Rights Watch and Médecins Sans Frontières reported several incidents in which killings were carried out almost exclusively with knives, machetes, hatchets or bayonets to avoid scaring off other refugees ahead on the road and to leave fewer traces of killing.

=== Women and children ===
Children alongside the adults were killed indiscriminately, sometimes in particularly cruel ways, with blows from hatchets or with their head smashed against a wall or tree trunk. Others were reported burned alive in their homes, along with their families. Office of the United Nations High Commissioner for Human Rights's DRC Mapping Exercise Report listed incidents of women who were raped before being killed, e.g. in the course of the refugee massacres at Hombo in December 1996. Women were also tortured and subjected to mutilation, particularly sexual, during these massacres.

=== Humanitarian Assistance – withheld and used as bait ===
On a number of occasions, attacking forces made it impossible to get humanitarian aid to starving, exhausted and sick refugees, either by blocking access to them or by relocating them out of the reach of assistance, thus depriving them of resources essential to their survival. Humanitarian aid agencies have been used repeatedly by the military to either locate refugees or lure them out of the forest in order to eliminate them.

"In the first three months of 1997, many refugees died of exhaustion and hunger during their journey between Kigulube and Shabunda. In danger of being killed at any moment, those in these groups, who were unfamiliar with their surroundings and undernourished, received no humanitarian aid. Having blocked aid agencies from operating outside a 30-kilometre radius of Bukavu, AFDL/APR officials established the condition that AFDL facilitators must accompany all their missions. According to several witnesses, these facilitators took advantage of their presence alongside the aid workers to supply AFDL/APR soldiers with information about the whereabouts and the movements of refugees. In this way, the soldiers were able to kill the refugees before they could be recovered and repatriated. During the same period, AFDL/APR soldiers officially barred Zairian civilians living in the region from giving assistance to refugees. Under this restriction, soldiers killed an unknown number of Zairians who had directly assisted refugees or collaborated with international NGOs and UN organisations to locate them and bring them assistance. The total number of refugees who died of hunger, exhaustion or disease in this part of South Kivu is impossible to establish but is probably in the region of several hundred, or even several thousand".

=== Evidence concealed ===
The massacre of refugees went on concomitantly with the clean-up of grave sites. According to UN investigations, Human Rights Watch, and Médecins Sans Frontières, the perpetrators of the massacre of refugees made concerted efforts to conceal the evidence by cleansing massacre sites, burning corpses and killing or intimidating witnesses. "Efforts in both of these areas-cleanups and intimidation intensified since April 1997, paralleling an increase in allegations of massacres and the arrival in the region on four occasions of United Nations investigative teams. Pressure from the international community on the Congolese government to cooperate with the U.N. missions may also have contributed to intensified cleanup and intimidation efforts by the ADFL and its allies".

=== Massacres of Hutu of all nationalities ===
Many Burundian Hutu refugees living in South Kivu shared the fate of their Rwandan and Congolese companions. Many were killed when their camps were attacked or while fleeing to the west with the Rwandans. Some drowned when they attempted to cross Lake Tanganyika in search of safety and others were massacred by the Burundian army when they were forcibly repatriated to Burundi, especially at Gatumba border post, but also elsewhere along the Ruzizi river, which they attempted to cross in order to reach the Burundian provinces of Bubanza and Cibitoke.

Hutu of Congolese nationality were also selected and targeted. An example is of the 30 October 1996 killing of 350 Hutu Congolese by AFDL units with blows of hammers to the head in Rutshuru town centre, close to the ANP house. "In the days leading up to the massacres, the soldiers had appealed to civilians who had fled the village of Kiringa, one kilometre from Rutshuru, to return home to attend a large public meeting on 30 October. When they returned to the village, the inhabitants of Kiringa were led to Rutshuru town centre and shut away in the ANP house. In the afternoon, the soldiers began to compile a register and asked people of Nande ethnic origin to return home. They then separated the men and women on the grounds that the women had to go and prepare the meal. The women were taken to the Maison de la Poste, where they were executed. The men were bound and led in pairs to a sand quarry several dozen metres from the ANP house. All of them were then executed with blows of hammers".

== Acts committed vis-à-vis Article 2 of Genocide Convention ==
The apparent systematic and widespread attacks reveal a number of inculpatory elements that characterized them as crime of genocide. Two separate reports by the United Nations, in 1997 and 1998, examined whether or not crimes of genocide had been committed against Hutu and other refugees in the DRC. In both cases, the reports concluded that there were elements that might indicate that genocide had been committed.

• "At the time of the incidents covered by this report, the Hutu population in Zaïre, including refugees from Rwanda and Burundi, constituted an ethnic group within the meaning of the Convention on the Prevention and Punishment of the Crime of Genocide of 1948" (OHCHR, 2010, p. 280). The scale of the crimes committed by the APR against hundreds of thousands of Hutu of all nationalities [Rwandan, Congolese & Burundian] including the Hutu established in the DRC decades confirm that it was all Hutu, as such, who were targeted".

• The extensive use of edged weapons (primarily hammers) and the systematic nature of the massacres of survivors (children, women, the elderly and the sick, undernourished) after the camps had been taken indicate that the numerous deaths cannot be attributed to the hazards of war or to collateral damage. "The majority of the victims were children, women, elderly people and the sick, who were often undernourished and posed no threat to the attacking forces. Numerous serious attacks on the physical or mental integrity of members of the group were committed, with a very high number of Hutus shot, raped, burnt or beaten".

• The attacks took place in each locality where Hutu refugees were detected by the APR on a very large area of the Congolese territory from East to West and the relentless pursuit of Hutu refugees lasted months. The humanitarian assistance intended for Hutu refugees was deliberately blocked by the Rwandan army, particularly in the Orientale province, thus depriving them of resources essential to their survival (OHCHR, 2010). The massacre of refugees in Congo was aimed at eliminating a large portion of the Hutu ethnic group and according to Article 2 of the 1948 Genocide Convention, and qualify as a crime of genocide. Such crimes call for a further investigation by a competent, independent and impartial body to bring to justice of those responsible for the violations committed.

=== Unresolved legal classification ===
The DRC Mapping Exercise report team noted that "The question of whether the numerous serious acts of violence committed against the Hutus (refugees and others) constitute crimes of genocide has attracted a significant degree of comment and to date remains unresolved. The report repeatedly stresses that this question can "only be decided by a court decision on the basis of evidence beyond all reasonable doubt. However, "the apparent systematic and widespread attacks described in this report reveal a number of inculpatory elements that, if proven before a competent court, could be characterised as crimes of genocide." Although in its Paragraph 518, it noted that "It seems possible to infer a specific intention on the part of certain AFDL/APR commanders to partially destroy the Hutus in the DRC, and therefore to commit a crime of genocide", the team went on to submit in Paragraph 522 of the report that, "it is important that a full judicial investigation take place, in order to shed light on the reported incidents" in 1996-97. "Only such an investigation and judicial determination would be in a position to resolve whether these incidents amount to the crime of genocide." Certain elements could cause a court to hesitate to decide on the existence of a genocidal plan, such as the fact that as of 15 November 1996, several tens of thousands of Rwandan Hutu refugees, many of whom had survived previous attacks, were repatriated to Rwanda with the help of the AFDL/APR authorities and that hundreds of thousands of Rwandan Hutu refugees were able to return to Rwanda with the consent of the Rwandan authorities prior to the start of the first war. Whilst, in general, the killings did not spare women and children, in some places, at the beginning of the first war, Hutu women and children were in fact separated from the men, and only the men were subsequently killed.

=== State involvement ===
In an interview with the Washington Post on 9 July 1997, Rwandan president Paul Kagame (then Defence Minister) recognised that Rwandan troops had played a key role in creating AFDL and took part in its campaign. According to President Paul Kagame, the campaign strategy comprised three elements: a) destroy the refugee camps; b) destroy ex-FAR and Interahamwe, based in and around the camps; and c) overthrow the Mobutu regime. Following her research into complete history of the Rwandan genocide and the crimes of the Rwandan Patriotic Front (RPF), through interviews with RPF defectors, former soldiers and atrocity survivors, supported by documents leaked from a UN ICTR court, Judi Rever, a Canadian investigative journalist and author, alleged that Rwandan government is "ultimately responsible for the killing of an estimated 200,000 Rwandan Hutu and Congolese Hutu in Zaïre/DRC in 1996-97 and countless Hutus who returned to Rwanda from refugee camps between 1995 and 1998".

== See also ==
- Outline of genocide studies
- List of massacres in the Democratic Republic of the Congo
- Double genocide theory
