= Benjamin Dichter =

Canada convoy protest leader

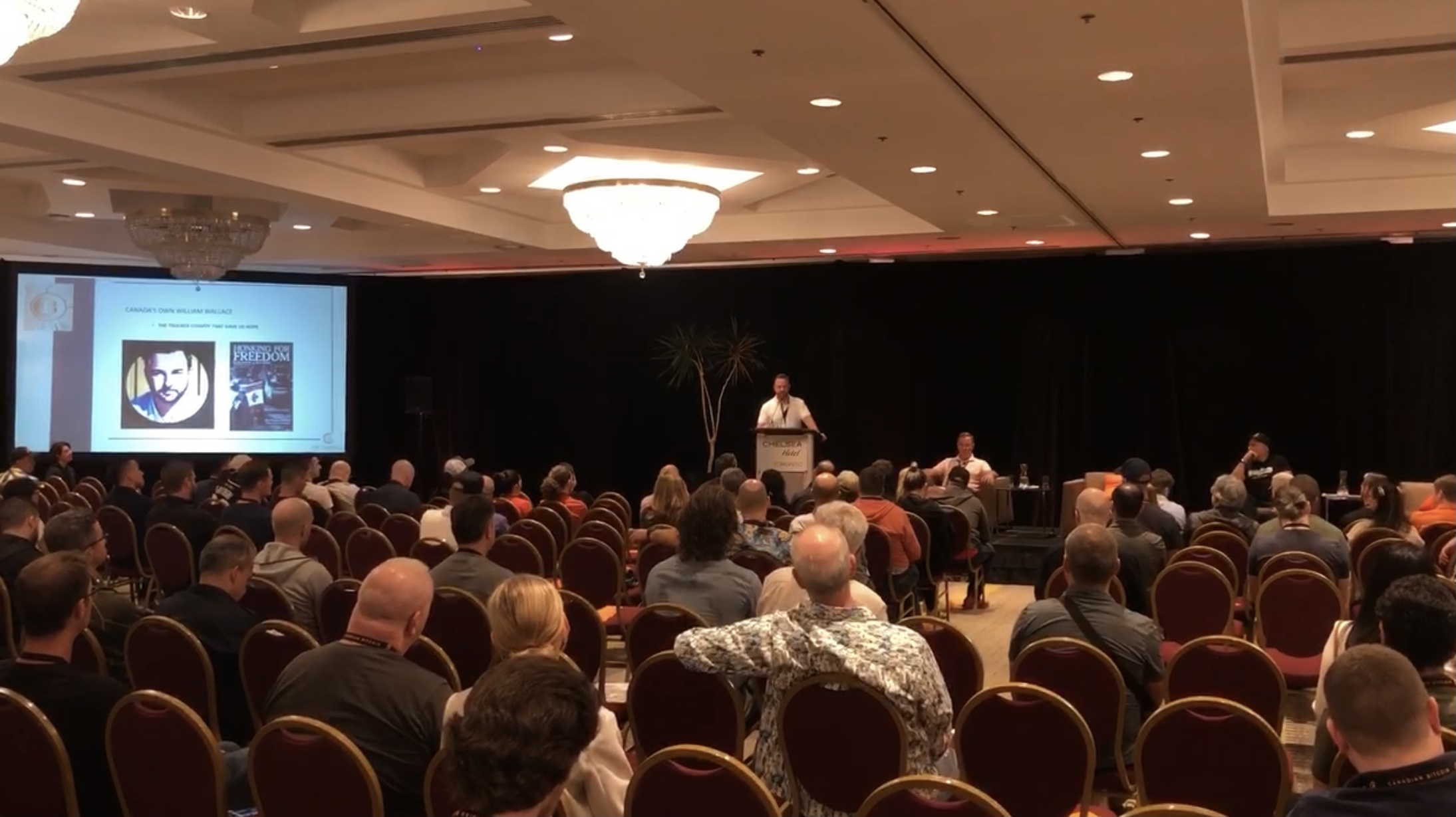
- Born: Benjamin Joseph Dichter; 1975 or 1976
- Occupations: Podcaster, author, gemologist, truck driver
- Organization: LGBTory
- Known for: Canadian convoy protest leadership

Benjamin Joseph Dichter (born 1975 or 1976) was a leader in the 2022 Canadian convoy protest. He is an entrepreneur, working as a journalist, truck driver, author and podcast publisher. Formerly, he has worked as a gemologist, and as a print shop owner in Toronto. He is the founder of the LGBTQ conservative group LGBTory.

Dichter was the candidate for Toronto Centre-Rosedale in the 2014 Toronto municipal election, and the 2015 Conservative candidate for Toronto-Danforth. He lost in both elections. He has been noted for criticisms against partisan divisiveness, and his criticism against political tolerance of extremism.

== Early life and education ==
Dichter was adopted by a Jewish family and attended the Associated Hebrew Schools of Toronto and the York Mills Collegiate Institute.

== Career ==
Dichter is a truck driver who has worked as a gemologist, and as a print shop operator in Toronto. He patented an invention for motorcycles, registered in 2003.

Dichter has produced several podcasts, covering topics of philosophy, law, crime, terrorism, and the SARS-CoV-2 pandemic. Some podcasts include The Quiggin Report (anti-terrorism, Islamic extremism), the Open College podcast (philosophy, history, politics), and Not On Record (crime, legal research, investigations). He is the founder of Possibly Correct Media, that publishes a podcast by the same name.

== Politics ==
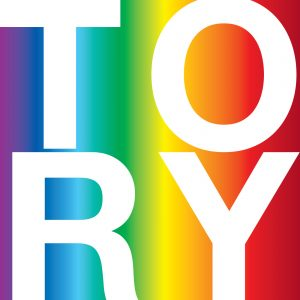
LGBTory logo

In 2014, Dichter ran for Toronto city council for Toronto Centre-Rosedale, winning approximately 1,500 out of 31,000 votes, (just under five per cent). His platform focused on budgets, infrastructure, transit, a desire to avoid partisanship politics, and a specific ambition to create affordable low-rise housing. Kristyn Wong-Tam won the riding.

After the original candidate Tim Dutaud was dropped by the federal Conservative Party of Canada, Dichter ran as the candidate for the Toronto-Danforth riding in 2015. Dichter was the only candidate to not turn up for a climate change debate and likewise missed the debate on electoral reform. He won 5,478 votes, ranking third, behind winner Liberal Julie Dabrusin and runner up New Democratic Party incumbent Craig Scott.

Dichter is the founder of LGBTory, the Rainbow Conservatives of Canada.

In 2016–2017, Dichter raised criticism against political tolerance to risk, from Islamic extremists. On 13 June 2016, Dichter and members of LGBTory attended a vigil in Toronto for the victims of the Orlando nightclub shooting; later criticizing some political and activist attendees, for hijacking the event. In 2019, at a People's Party of Canada's first national convention, Dichter did the opening keynote speech where he spoke about "political Islam" and how it has "infiltrated" the Liberal Party and the Conservative Party of Canada. Maxime Bernier thanked Dichter for raising questions about how Canada dealt with Islamic extremism.

== Canada convoy protest ==
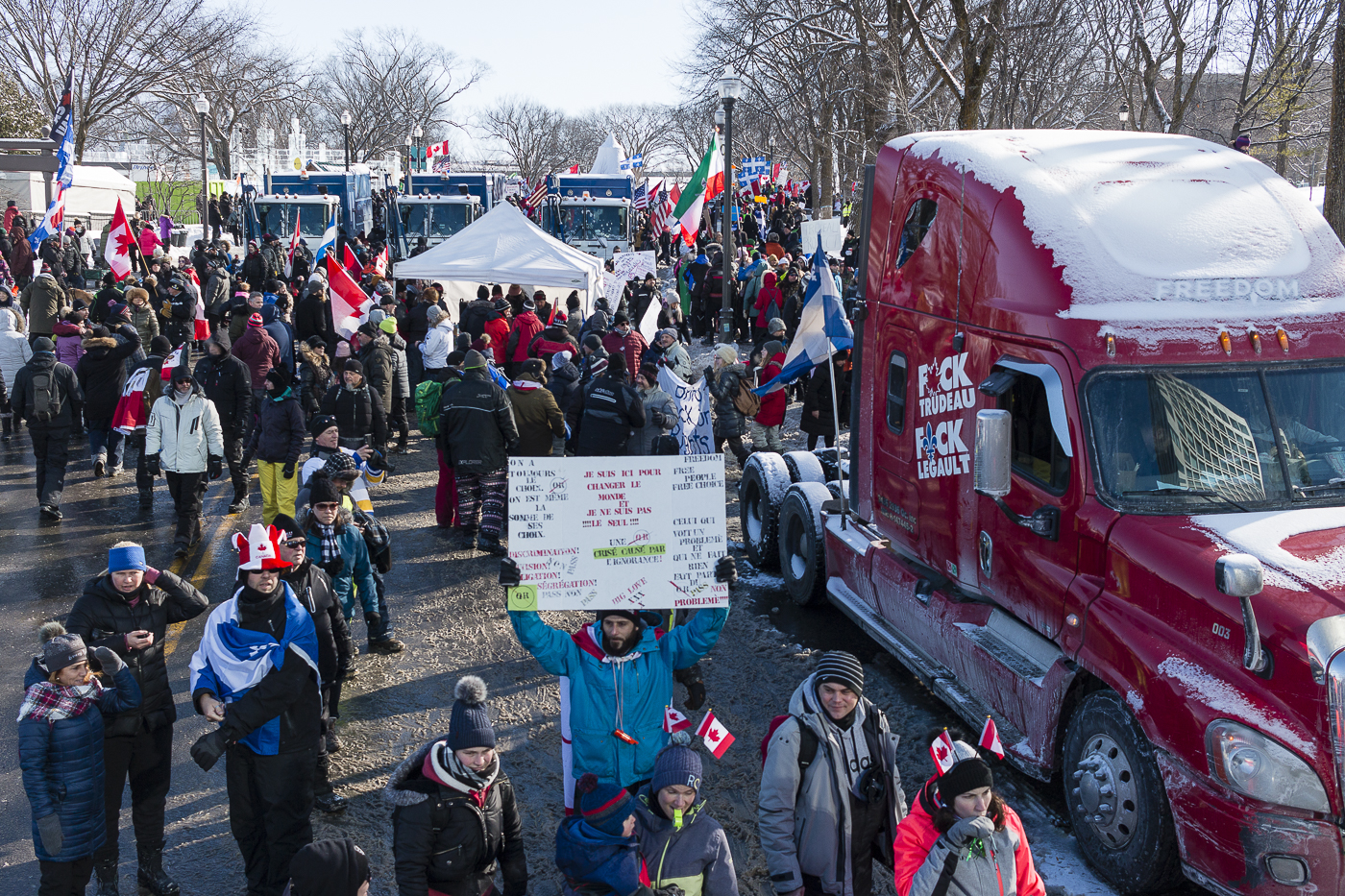
Ottawa convoy protest, 5 February 2022

Beginning mid-January 2022, Dichter was the spokesman, and the co-organizer of crowd funding, for the Canada convoy protest.

Dichter was listed, together with Tamara Lich, on the GoFundMe crowd-funding campaign. A superior court ruling on a Mareva injunction motion, resulted in the freezing of accounts holding donated funds. In February 2022, Dichter agreed to move the funds into an escrow account.

Dichter described his general views that align with the convoy in testimony at the Public Order Emergency Commission (POEC) in November 2022. He stated that he was vaccinated, but uncomfortable with mandates and ArriveCAN app and data tracking due to his work in trucking. He described his main message as spokesman was "peace, love, unity and freedom". Concerned with individuals and groups creating discord or promoting controversial messages in the protest, including James Bauder, Jeremy MacKenzie and Pat King and others, Dichter recommended official messaging to separate from others. On the topic of a couple confederate flags appearing of at the event, he expressed skepticism about the individuals and intentions.

As police moved to stop the protest, Dichter called on police to let drivers remove their vehicles.

He has self-published the book Honking for Freedom: The Truckers Convoy that Gave us Hope that was co-written with former journalist John Goddard.

At the end of 2023, Dichter remained a named defendant in a $300 million class-action lawsuit launched by Ottawa residents.

== Views and punditry ==
Dichter promotes use of Bitcoin, including during the Ottawa protest and afterwards, speaking about use of cryptocurrency to keep crowdsourced donations outside of government control. He has stated that the Liberal Party of Canada is "infested with Islamists". He has said that "Justin Trudeau must be stopped…no matter the cost” and has described all politicians of all parties as "all horrible, all of them". The Toronto Friends of Simon Wiesenthal Centre has stated that Dichters comments on Islam as potentially islamophobic. His anti-Islam views have were noted in the New York Times in 2022, the Guardian quoted his warning of the “growing Islamization of Canada”.

He has criticized Pride Toronto for banning police, describing it as having gone "full circle from being a civil rights cause to a celebration to a form of regressive left political weaponry".

Dichter is a regular pundit on Fox News and on 27 January 2022, he was a guest on Tucker Carlson's Fox News program. He spoke about his journey to Ottawa ahead of the Ottawa protests, and how Alberta looked like a "third-world country" due the trucking industry being affected by the COVID-19 pandemic. He has also appeared on Russian state controlled media RT.

== Personal life ==
Dichter lives in the Danforth area of Toronto. He has previously lived in South America.

He was aged 46 in December 2022. He has a brother, who is a police officer.

== See also ==
2014 and 2015 politics

- 2014 Toronto municipal election
- Results of the 2015 Canadian federal election by riding

2022 protests

- Tamara Lich
- Pat King
- COVID-19 pandemic in Canada
- COVID-19 protests in Canada
