= Christian Democrat Party of Canada =

Defunct right wing political party in Canada

The Christian Democrat Party of Canada was a Canadian political party that organized briefly in 1981-82, in an attempt to start a right-wing populist party.

The Christian Democrat Party was founded by Sydney Thompson, of Dunnville, Ontario. Thompson served in Korea with the Royal Canadian Navy, and managed the Hotel Plaza II in Toronto.

In a 1982 by-election in Toronto's Broadview—Greenwood riding, Thompson, running as an independent, won 38 votes, or 0.14% of the total. He placed eighth in a field of nine candidates, following three other independents and the Rhinoceros Party of Canada candidate, but placing ahead of perennial candidate John Turmel, who collected 19 votes.

== Party program ==
The party's political platform proposed to:

- Support and encourage law enforcement agencies. Restore capital punishment.
- Increase the National Defence budget. Require compulsory service for young people. Re-divide the Canadian Armed Forces into the Royal Canadian Army, Navy and Air Force.
- Strengthen the economy by implementing political stability. Reduce the federal deficit. Restore full value of the Canadian dollar. Remove employable people from welfare roles by offering them productive jobs.
- Increase immigration with the ultimate goal of increasing population from 25 million to 200 million people. Encourage assimilation of immigrants and end multiculturalism policy.
- Pass legislation to bring inflation under control.
- Discover new energy resources; transport prisoners to northern areas to exploit energy resources.
- Adopt a "Canada first" foreign policy. Halt foreign aid to communist countries and other dictatorships.
- Abolish bilingualism policy.
- Deport to the country of their choice any person advocating the separation of Quebec or another province from Canada.
- Reduce taxes in general, and aim to eliminate the personal income tax over time.
- Review performance of boards of education and pass legislation where warranted to improve education. (Note: in Canada, education is a responsibility of provincial governments.)
- Abolish the metric system, and return to the Imperial system of weights and measures.
- Repeal law permitting homosexual acts.
- Prohibit abortion other than in cases of rape and incest. Create and staff adoption centres.
- Pass laws to oppose the use of narcotics and marijuana.
- Appoint cabinet ministers who have experience in the areas for which they are responsible.

== See also ==
- Christian Heritage Party of Canada
- Christian democracy
- List of political parties in Canada
