= Dennis Mills =

Canadian politician

Member of Parliament for Toronto—Danforth (Broadview-Greenwood; 1988–2000)
- In office November 21, 1988 – June 28, 2004
- Preceded by: Lynn McDonald
- Succeeded by: Jack Layton

Personal details
- Born: Dennis Joseph Mills; July 19, 1946 (age 79) Toronto, Ontario, Canada
- Party: Liberal
- Spouse: Vicki
- Children: Stephanie, Jennifer, Craig, Andrea
- Occupation: Businessman

Dennis Joseph Mills (born July 19, 1946) is a Canadian businessman and former politician. He was a Liberal Member of Parliament (MP) from 1988 to 2004, representing Toronto—Danforth (formerly Broadview-Greenwood) in Toronto's east end. Mills has long conducted business in the Toronto area, including as CEO and vice-chairman of MI Developments from 2004 to 2011, and as the current president and CEO of Toronto Partners Inc. and Racing Future Inc.

== Early life and politics ==
Born in Toronto, Mills graduated from St. Michael's College School in 1964, then attended the University of St. Thomas in Houston. He served on the personal staff of Prime Minister Pierre Trudeau from 1980 until 1984, when Trudeau was succeeded as Liberal leader and prime minister by John Turner. He then joined Magna International as a vice-president, serving until 1987.

Mills ran as the Liberal candidate in Broadview-Greenwood in the 1988 election, defeating New Democratic Party (NDP) incumbent Lynn McDonald over the issue of support for the Meech Lake Accord, which Mills opposed. With the Progressive Conservative government of Brian Mulroney re-elected and the Liberal Party remaining in opposition, Mills served as assistant critic for communications, critic for small business and tourism, and assistant critic for industry, science and technology in the 34th Parliament.

When the Liberal Party, under the leadership of Jean Chrétien, formed the government following the 1993 election, he served as parliamentary secretary to the Minister of Industry from 1993 to 1996. He briefly left the Liberal caucus in 1996 to sit as an "Independent Liberal", in protest of the government's failure to abolish the Goods and Service Tax as it had promised in the 1993 campaign. He was re-elected in 1997 by defeating the NDP's Jack Layton, and served as chair of the House of Commons Sub-Committee on the study of sport in Canada, and vice-chair of the House of Commons Standing Committee on Canadian Heritage in the 36th Parliament.

On the suggestion of Mills, the name of his riding was changed to "Toronto—Danforth" ahead of the 2000 election. He believed that "Broadview--Greenwood" was confusing on a federal scale, and because the NDP had registered a web address for Broadview—Greenwood. He kept his seat in that election, and continued in his committee and sub-committee roles in the 37th Parliament. Following Chrétien's resignation as Liberal leader, Mills publicly considered contesting the 2003 leadership convention and agitated against a "coronation" for front runner Paul Martin, but he did not end up standing for the leadership.

He had helped to organize large events in Toronto, including World Youth Day in 2002 which brought Pope John Paul II to the city, and the post-SARS Rolling Stones concert in 2003. In 1989, Mills organized the Summit on the Environment in Toronto, which attracted approximately 50,000 people and performers such as John Denver and Gordon Lightfoot. Starting in 1999, he initiated events for the Family Farm Tribute to recognize the contributions of Canadian family farms. In 2001, with the Assembly of First Nations, he organized and co-chaired the Bala Summit on Water (See http://dennismills.com/water-manifesto/), attended by leading experts from Canada and the United States.

In 2001, he was criticized for spending $330,884 on travel and office expenses, more than any other Liberal MP. In 2004, he was voted Best Constituency MP by the Ottawa Hill Times.

In the 2004 election, Mills faced a re-match against Jack Layton, who had been the leader of the NDP since 2003. Mills placed ahead of Green Party leader Jim Harris and Conservative candidate Loftus Cuddy, but lost to Layton by nearly 2,400 votes. One of the major issues of the campaign was the fate of the Toronto waterfront and Mills' public support for the highly controversial Toronto Port Authority.

== Recent life ==
After leaving parliament, Mills re-joined Magna International where he served as CEO and vice-chairman of MI Developments until 2011, with responsibility for all of the company's global real estate assets including all North American thoroughbred racetracks. In 2010 he founded Racing Future Inc., a portal for the global community dedicated to re-building and growing the sport of horse racing. He had also served on the boards of directors of Pacific Rubiales Energy (2012-2016), CGX Energy (2013-present), and Hut8 Mining (until 2020), and as president of the Bala branch of the Royal Canadian Legion.

Mills and his wife Vicki have four children: Jennifer, Craig, Stephanie, and Andrea.

== Positions ==
He has long been involved in the rebuilding plans for the Toronto waterfront. He was responsible for the creation of the Toronto Port Authority and is still one of its greatest proponents, though he opposes the proposed bridge to the island airport designed by the Port Authority. In 2004, Mills unveiled his plan for the Toronto Waterfront, which includes a campus of the United Nations University for Peace, as well as an aquarium, plenty of greenspace, affordable housing, and new sporting facilities. Funding for the university campus was promised on May 20, 2004, by the federal government, but only $3 million, which will not be sufficient. This was part of $125 million re-announced by Paul Martin in funding for the other recommendations in the project. This is smaller than the $325 million promised in the 1997 election and the $300 million promised in the 2000 election, of which of less than $10 million was ever actually delivered.

He was considered by many to be an opponent of Toronto mayor David Miller. He was at first a supporter of John Nunziata in the 2003 mayoral election, but then switched his support to John Tory, who had become one of the leading candidates.

In 2003, he promised in writing to resign in thirty days if an abandoned property known as the Gatekeeper Squat was not turned into community housing. This was, in Mills' words, "to avoid a riot" between the Ontario Coalition Against Poverty and the police. Shortly before the month's end, a compromise deal to convert the property into interim housing was reached. Many protested that the house was not converted into public housing by the end of the 30 days and thus felt the issue had been exploited, but supporters of Mills claim that it would have been impossible to do so much in so little time, and that the weather at the time, which went as low as -30 degrees Celsius, made conversion of a building impossible.

Mills was regularly labelled by opponents one of the most socially conservative members of the Liberal caucus. He was opposed to same-sex marriage, a position unpopular in the strongly left-wing riding of Toronto–Danforth. His defeat was a high priority of gay rights groups in the 2004 election. That said, he did favour civil unions, and stated he would respect any decision derived from a free vote on the issue in the House of Commons. He is personally opposed to abortion rights, but does not and has never opposed or raised debate regarding the issue or abortion laws. These social views are commonly associated with his Roman Catholic faith.

Mills is noted for having advocated what opponents call a flat tax, which he calls a "single tax", about which he wrote two books, A Life Less Taxing and The Single Tax. His other published book is Developing an Agenda for the 21st Century.
