= Christopher Porter =

Canadian animal rights activist

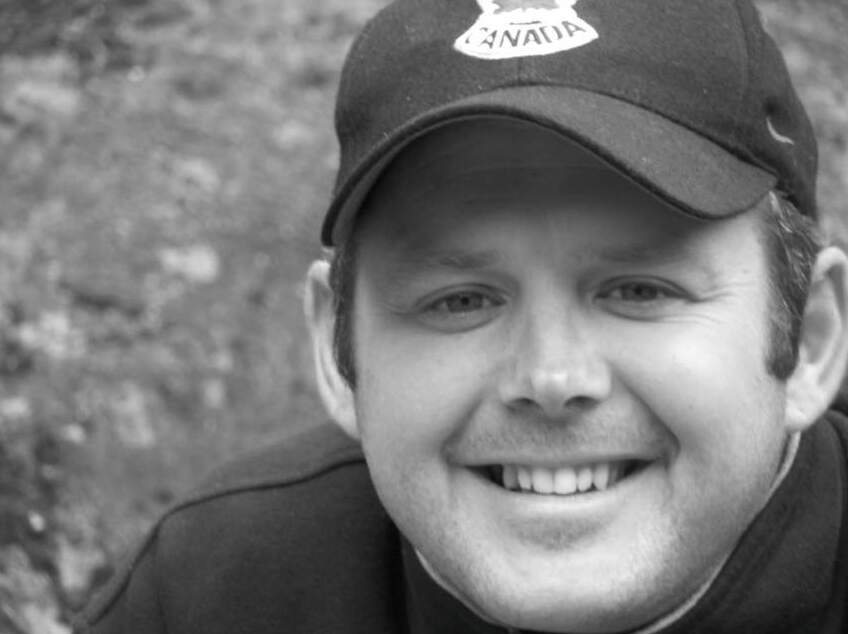

Leader of the Canadian Action Party
- In office September 2010 – July 2012
- Preceded by: Melissa Brade
- Succeeded by: Jason Chase

Personal details
- Born: Christopher Robert Porter; September 27, 1970 (age 56) Victoria, British Columbia, Canada
- Party: Canadian Action

Christopher Robert Porter (born September 27, 1970) is a Canadian political activist and was the biggest buyer and seller of dolphins in the world.

He was the leader of the small Canadian Action Party between 2010 and 2012 and was a candidate in the federal by-election in Toronto—Danforth. He lost the election to New Democratic Party candidate Craig Scott. Porter received 75 votes.

From 2003 to 2009 he sold 83 dolphins around the world. In late 2009, he stated that he was leaving the dolphin-export business to become an environmental activist. In March 2010, Porter said that he had decided to release his last 17 dolphins back into the wild however the majority were not released, and died in captivity.

== Past work ==
During the 1990s, Porter worked at Sealand of the Pacific, where he trained Tilikum the killer whale. Later, he worked at the Vancouver Aquarium where he was the head trainer. He was a consultant for Italy's national aquarium, Aquarium of Genoa, prior to his work in the Solomon Islands. During 2005 he created the world's first open ocean dive program with sea lions in Curaçao, Netherlands Antilles.

== Dolphin resort and export business ==
In 2003 Porter established a resort business to be funded by dolphin exports in the Solomon Islands where he leased Gavutu Island, a World War II Japanese seaplane base. In 2005, Dave Phillips, executive director of the Earth Island Institute described Porter's captures of dolphins as 'horrific' and the 'worst instance of capture for dolphin trafficking in the world'. Campaigners in 2005 sought to free dolphins held at the resort run by Porter, describing them as "depressed". Porter's associate replied that the claims were lies and government health inspections had assessed the animals as being free from disease and infection.

== Free the Pod ==
In 2010, Porter started the 'Free the Pod' campaign, aiming to release captive dolphins back into the wild. He has said he was "disillusioned with the industry", due to the death of trainer Dawn Brancheau in an incident with Tillikum and the documentary The Cove. Dave Phillips and Earth Island Institute accepted Porter's invitation to join with him for Free the Pod, which was featured in Animal Planet's Blood Dolphin$ series.

== Electoral results ==
Canadian federal by-election, March 19, 2012: Toronto—Danforth Death of Jack Layton
Party	Candidate	Votes	%	±%	Expenditures
New Democratic	Craig Scott	19,210	59.44	−1.36	$ 82,847.22
Liberal	Grant Gordon	9,215	28.51	+10.89	86,016.54
Conservative	Andrew Keyes	1,736	5.37	−8.95	73,735.56
Green	Adriana Mugnatto-Hamu	1,517	4.69	−1.77	57,955.38
Progressive Canadian	Dorian Baxter	208	0.64	–	1,473.73
Libertarian	John C. Recker	133	0.41	–	2,433.05
Independent	Leslie Bory	77	0.24	–	898.69
Canadian Action	Christopher Porter	75	0.23	–	3,163.57
Independent	John Turmel	57	0.18	–	–
United	Brian Jedan	55	0.17	–	130.18
Independent	Bahman Yazdanfar	36	0.11	–	622.86
Total valid votes/expense limit		32,319	100.00		$ 86,821.95
Total rejected ballots		150	0.46	−0.13	
Turnout		32,469	43.58	−21.32	
New Democratic hold		Swing		−6.13	
Source(s) "By-election March 19, 2012 – Official Voting Results". Elections Canada. "Financial Reports: Candidate's Electoral Campaign Return – March 19, 2012 By-election".
