= Rwanda: The Untold Story =

2014 documentary film by BBC

Rwanda: The Untold Story is a 2014 documentary film by the British Broadcasting Corporation that was broadcast on BBC2 at prime-time on 1 October 2014.

== Synopsis ==
The documentary follows two American academics, Allan Stam and Christian Davenport, who had travelled to Rwanda in 1998 to listen to alleged witnesses of the genocide. It also featured former close associates of Rwandan President Paul Kagame who spoke from hiding abroad.

According to the BBC, the documentary questioned the role of Kagame's Rwandan Patriotic Front forces in during the genocide and his role in the shooting down the presidential plane that sparked the genocide while claiming to have ended it.

The documentary alleged that instead of 800,000 Tutsi deaths, there were only around 200,000. It further posited that at least 800,000 Hutus had been killed at the hands of the Rwandese Patriotic Front.

== Critical reception ==
Following the outrage by Rwandans, which included a march to the local BBC office and Nyanza Genocide Memorial Centre, Rwanda Utilities Regulatory Authority suspended the broadcast of local-language BBC programs.

The Rwandan Parliament decided to charge BBC with "genocide denial" and an inquiry advised Rwanda to take criminal action against the BBC. The BBC insisted it was their duty to make the documentary.
