= Lynn McDonald =

Canadian politician (born 1940)

Lynn McDonald CM
- Lecturing in Toronto, November 2009

Member of Parliament for Broadview-Greenwood
- In office 1982–1988
- Preceded by: Bob Rae
- Succeeded by: Dennis Mills

Personal details
- Born: 15 July 1940 (age 86)
- Party: New Democrat
- Profession: Professor

Lynn McDonald CM (born 15 July 1940) is a Canadian academic, climate activist and former Member of Parliament. She is a former president of the National Action Committee on the Status of Women and was the New Democratic Party (NDP) Member of Parliament for Broadview—Greenwood from 1982 until 1988. McDonald is professor emerita of Sociology at the University of Guelph. In 2025, Dr. McDonald was awarded the King Charles III Coronation Medal.

== Political career ==
McDonald's first run for public office was during the 1981 provincial election when she was the Ontario New Democratic Party's candidate in the riding of Oriole in North York.

The next year, she entered federal politics and was elected in the by-election held to fill the vacancy created by Bob Rae's departure from federal politics to take the leadership of the Ontario NDP. She defeated senior party aide Gerald Caplan on the third ballot to win the NDP nomination. In the by-election she defeated former Toronto Sun editor Peter Worthington, who was running as an independent, by almost 2,000 votes. In the 1984 federal election, she increased her margin to over 3,500 votes again defeating Worthington who, this time, was running as the official Progressive Conservative candidate.

McDonald championed women's equality both inside and outside Parliament (she was the first Member of Parliament to be addressed as Ms.) She was a co-founder of the Ontario Committee on the Status of Women, 1971, which lobbied for implementation of the measures of the Report of the Royal Commission on the Status of Women in Canada (to which she had given a brief).

As president of the National Action Committee on the Status of Women, in 1980, she gave the organization's brief on equality rights to the Joint Senate-Commons committee on the Charter of Rights.

McDonald was also a notable opponent of smoking. She earned the enmity of the tobacco industry by moving a private member's bill to restrict smoking and ban tobacco advertising and sponsorships.

She succeeded in getting the Non-smokers’ Health Act adopted, as a private member's bill, in 1988, the first legislation in the world to establish smoke-free work and public places. The Bill also would have banned tobacco advertising and sponsorships and regulated sales by listed tobacco products under the Hazardous Products Act.

McDonald's bill was short-listed by a parliamentary committee for debate on the floor of the house and succeeded in winning growing support from MPs from all sides of the House of Commons as health groups lobbied in its favour. On 22 April 1987, ten days prior to the Bill's scheduled second reading vote, Health Minister Jake Epp announced the government's intention to introduce a bill that would ban tobacco advertising and sponsorships and strengthen health warnings on cigarette packages. The government also announced that it would prohibit smoking in government buildings and restrict it in other federally regulated workplaces.

Despite intense lobbying by the tobacco industry, both McDonald's bill and Epp's Bill C-51, were passed by parliament and given royal assent on 28 June 1988. The lobbying around McDonald's bill is credited with giving Epp the political motivation to introduce his own legislation. McDonald's bill passed in a free vote despite the fact that every member of Cabinet present in the House voted against it.

McDonald was defeated in the 1988 federal election by Liberal Dennis Mills by 1,200 votes. She attempted a comeback against Mills in the 1993 federal election, but was defeated by almost 10,000 votes as support for the NDP collapsed nationwide.

In 2012, she joined with other Nightingale academics and promoters to form the Nightingale Society.

McDonald has since been active on environmental issues, initially with the Campaign for Nuclear Phaseout, and later as co-founder of JustEarth: A Coalition for Environmental Justice, which works on climate change; she was a member of the Board of Directors of Climate Action Network 2010–2014.

A co-founder of the Canadian Electoral Alliance, McDonald campaigned for such an alliance for the 2015 federal election, which would lead to adoption of proportional representation at the federal level.

McDonald is also a co-founder of the Campaign for the Abolition of Solitary Confinement.

She was named a Member of the Order of Canada in 2015 and elected a Fellow of the Royal Historical Society in 2019.

In 2020, she joined with Ryerson academics and supporters to form the Friends of Egerton Ryerson, whose goal is the restoration of Ryerson's reputation and refutation of the false accusations against him. In 2023, she was appointed to the advisory board of the Canadian Institute for Historical Education.

== Writing ==
McDonald is co-founder of The Nightingale Society which promotes the legacy of Florence Nightingale.

McDonald is the author of 28 books and numerous scholarly articles, beginning with two in criminology: Social Class and Delinquency (London: Faber & Faber, 1969) and The Sociology of Law and Order (London: Faber & Faber,1976); then The Party that Changed Canada: The New Democratic Party Then and Now, Macmillan of Canada, 1987). Her books on social theory began with The Early Origins of the Social Sciences (Montreal: McGill-Queen's University Press, 1993), Women Founders of the Social Sciences (Ottawa: Carleton University Press, 1994), and Women Theorists on Society and Politics (Waterloo: Wilfrid Laurier University Press 1998). She is the editor of The Collected Works of Florence Nightingale, a 16-volume, peer-reviewed edition of Florence Nightingale's books, articles, pamphlets and correspondence gathered from more than 200 archives worldwide, Wilfrid Laurier University Press, 2001–12.

=== Short Books on Nightingale ===
- Florence Nightingale at First Hand (London: Bloomsbury and Waterloo: Wilfrid Laurier University Press, 2010).
- Mary Seacole: The Making of the Myth. Toronto: Iguana Books 2014.
- Florence Nightingale: A Very Brief History (London: SPCK 2017)
- Florence Nightingale, Nursing and Health Care Today (New York: Springer 2018).
- Florence Nightingale: A Reference Guide to Her Life and Works (Lanham: Rowman & Littlefield, 2020)
- Florence Nightingale and the Medical Men: Working Together for Health Care Reform (Montreal: McGill-Queen's University Press 2022).

=== Publications on Ryerson ===
- "How a ‘Maker of Canada’ was Framed: The unjust treatment of Egerton Ryerson." The 1867 Project: Why Canada should be cherished—not cancelled, in Mark Milke, ed., Aristotle Foundation for Public Policy, 2023, 108-18.
- "The historical record vindicates Egerton Ryerson." National Post 9 September 2021.
- 30 August 2021. "Egerton Ryerson." Globe and Mail. A10
- 30 April 2022. "Setting the Record Straight." Toronto Star
