= Julie Dabrusin =

Canadian politician (born 1971)

The Honourable Julie Dabrusin PC MP
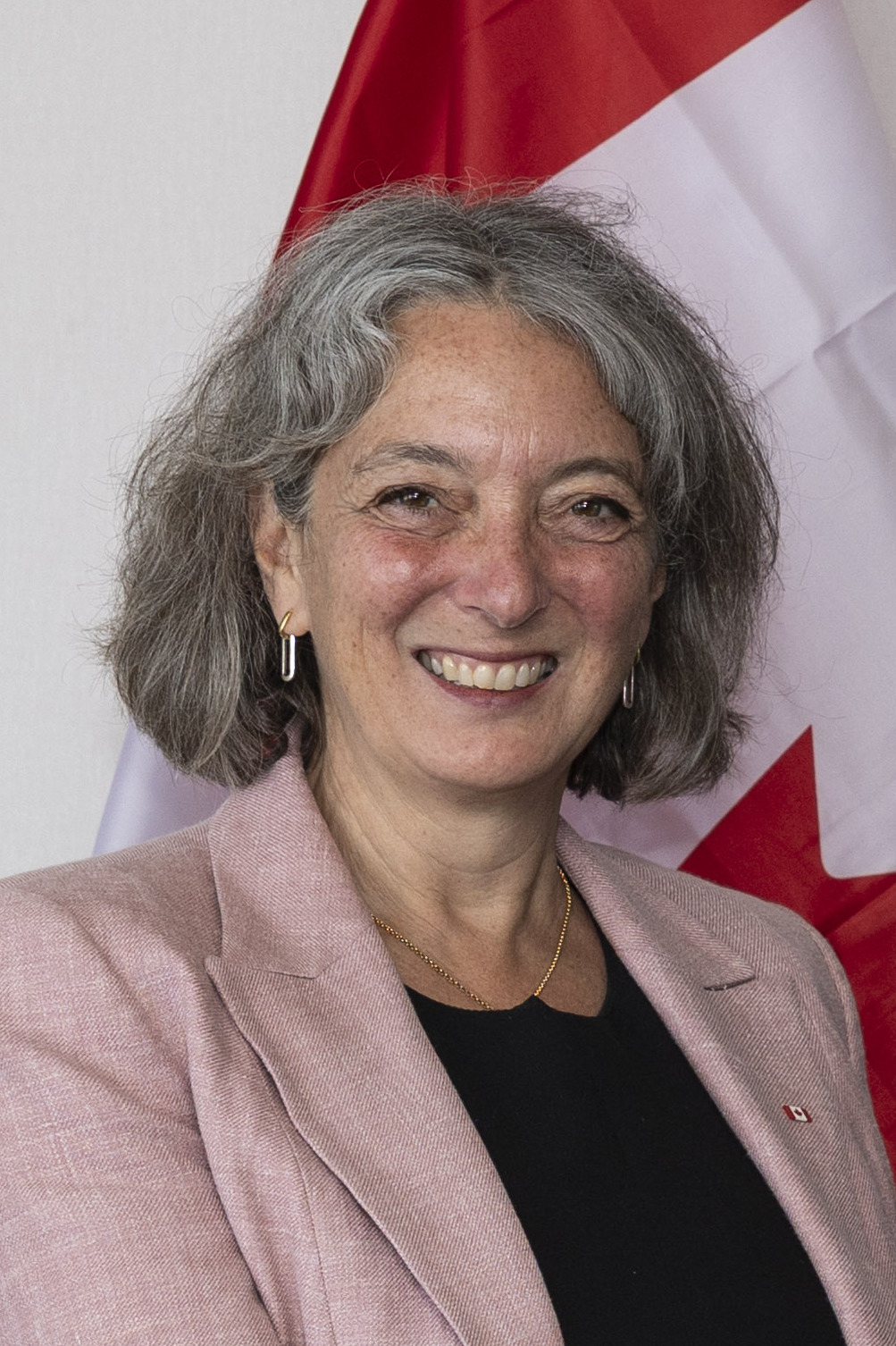
- Dabrusin in 2026

Minister of the Environment, Climate Change and Nature (Note: Added "Nature" title on December 1, 2025.)
- Incumbent
- Assumed office May 13, 2025
- Prime Minister: Mark Carney
- Preceded by: Terry Duguid

Member of Parliament for Toronto—Danforth
- Incumbent
- Assumed office October 19, 2015
- Preceded by: Craig Scott

Personal details
- Born: April 16, 1971 (age 55) Montreal, Quebec, Canada
- Party: Liberal
- Education: McGill University; University of Toronto
- Profession: Lawyer

Julie Aviva Dabrusin PC MP (French: [ʒyli dabʁyzɛ̃]; born April 16, 1971) is a Canadian lawyer and politician who has served as Minister of the Environment, Climate Change and Nature since 2025. A member of the Liberal Party, she has been a member of Parliament (MP) since the 2015 federal election, representing the riding of Toronto—Danforth in the House of Commons.

== Early life and career ==
Raised in a Jewish household in Montreal, Dabrusin pursued an undergraduate degree in Near and Middle Eastern Studies at McGill University, graduating with a bachelor of arts in 1994. She then attended the University of Toronto for her law degree, graduating in 1997, and moved to Toronto's Danforth area with her family in 1998. She spent 13 years as a lawyer with Rogers Partners LLP, a Toronto law firm. She practiced litigation, including serving as commission counsel for the Toronto External Contracts Inquiry, which examined municipal government procurement processes.

In 2011, Dabrusin left her legal career to focus on raising her two daughters and participating in various community organizing and charitable activities aimed at promoting and preserving Toronto's public parks. In 2013, she was a recipient of the Queen Elizabeth II Diamond Jubilee Medal.

== Politics ==
Dabrusin decided to run in the 2015 federal election primarily on concerns about income inequality and government neglect of Canada's urban areas. Dabrusin won the election, unseating New Democratic Party (NDP) incumbent Craig Scott in Toronto—Danforth. That riding was previously held by NDP leader Jack Layton and was considered to be a safe seat; it has long been one of the more left-leaning ridings in Toronto. She was re-elected in 2019 and 2021, serving as Parliamentary Secretary to the Minister of Canadian Heritage from 2019 to 2021, and Parliamentary Secretary to the Minister of Environment and Climate Change and to the Minister of Energy and Natural Resources from 2021 to March 2025.

Following her re-election in 2025, she joined the 30th Canadian Ministry that May as Minister of Environment and Climate Change. She added the nature and parks role to her position in December 2025, absorbing it from former minister Steven Guilbeault.

She announced in July 2026 $7 million for northern clean‑energy projects.

== Electoral record ==
2025 Canadian federal election: Toronto—Danforth
| Party | Candidate | Votes | % | ±% | Expenditures |
|---|---|---|---|---|---|
| Liberal | Julie Dabrusin | 38,794 | 66.56 | +18.20 | |
| Conservative | Ashik Hussain | 11,060 | 18.98 | +6.42 | |
| New Democratic | Clare Hacksel | 7,554 | 12.96 | –20.71 | |
| Green | Silvia Stardust | 625 | 1.07 | –0.89 | |
| Animal Protection | Liz White | 250 | 0.43 | +0.05 | |
| Total valid votes/expense limit | | | | | |
| Total rejected ballots | | | | | |
| Turnout | | 58,283 | 71.16 | | |
| Eligible voters | | 81,901 | | | |
| Liberal notional hold | | Swing | | +5.89 | |
Source: Elections Canada

2021 Canadian federal election: Toronto—Danforth
| Party | Candidate | Votes | % | ±% | Expenditures |
|---|---|---|---|---|---|
| Liberal | Julie Dabrusin | 23,038 | 48.41 | +0.58 | $77,319.65 |
| New Democratic | Clare Hacksel | 15,881 | 33.28 | +0.08 | $94,784.85 |
| Conservative | Michael Carey | 6,105 | 12.83 | +2.29 | $25,348.44 |
| People's | Wayne Simmons | 1,238 | 2.59 | +1.49 | $766.61 |
| Green | Maryem Tollar | 949 | 1.99 | -4.51 | $2,899.08 |
| Communist | Elizabeth Rowley | 204 | 0.43 | +0.13 | $0.00 |
| Animal Protection | Liz White | 179 | 0.38 | -0.02 | $3,315.07 |
| Independent | Habiba Desai | 125 | 0.26 | | $510.82 |
| Total valid votes/expense limit | | 47,719 | – | – | $110,583.29 |
| Total rejected ballots | | | | | |
| Turnout | | 47,719 | 59.84 | | |
| Eligible voters | | 79,749 | | | |
| Liberal hold | | Swing | | +0.25 | |
Source: Elections Canada

2019 Canadian federal election: Toronto—Danforth
| Party | Candidate | Votes | % | ±% | Expenditures |
|---|---|---|---|---|---|
| Liberal | Julie Dabrusin | 27,681 | 47.68 | +5.34 | $75,766 |
| New Democratic | Min Sook Lee | 19,283 | 33.21 | -6.96 | $102,067 |
| Conservative | Zia Choudhary | 6,091 | 10.49 | +0.63 | $19,351 |
| Green | Chris Tolley | 3,761 | 6.48 | +1.77 | |
| People's | Tara Dos Remedios | 621 | 1.07 | - | $3,633 |
| Animal Protection | Elizabeth Abbott | 261 | 0.45 | -0.19 | $2,645 |
| Independent | John Kladitis | 210 | 0.36 | - | $2,953 |
| Communist | Ivan Byard | 151 | 0.26 | - | |
| Total valid votes/expense limit | | 58,059 | 100.0 | | |
| Total rejected ballots | | 413 | | | |
| Turnout | | 58,472 | 71.9 | | |
| Eligible voters | | 81,283 | | | |
| Liberal hold | | Swing | | +6.15 | |
Source: Elections Canada

2015 Canadian federal election
| Party | Candidate | Votes | % | ±% | Expenditures |
|---|---|---|---|---|---|
| Liberal | Julie Dabrusin | 23,531 | 42.34 | +13.83 | – |
| New Democratic | Craig Scott | 22,325 | 40.17 | -19.27 | – |
| Conservative | Benjamin Dichter | 5,478 | 9.86 | +4.49 | – |
| Green | Chris Tolley | 2,618 | 4.71 | +0.02 | – |
| Progressive Canadian | John Richardson | 1,275 | 2.29 | +1.65 | – |
| Animal Alliance | Elizabeth Abbott | 354 | 0.64 | – | – |
| Total valid votes/Expense limit | | 55,581 | 100.0 | | $209,972.56 |
| Total rejected ballots | | 269 | 0.48 | – | |
| Turnout | | 55,850 | 72.38 | – | |
| Eligible voters | | 77,158 | | | |
| Liberal gain from New Democratic | | Swing | | – | |
Source: Elections Canada

== Notes ==
Order of precedence
| Preceded by Rebecca Chartrand as Member of the Cabinet | Order of Precedence of Canada as Member of the Cabinet | Succeeded by Lena Diab as Member of the Cabinet |
