= Gikongoro Province =

Former province of Rwanda

Coordinates: 02°30′S 29°35′E

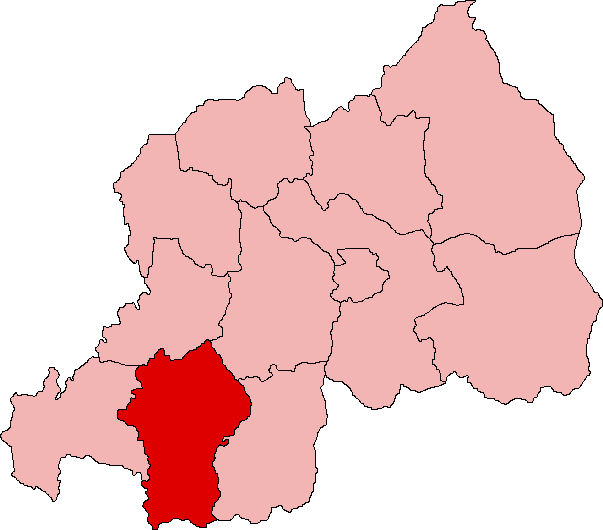
Map showing the former Gikongoro Province in Rwanda

Gikongoro Province was one of the former twelve provinces (intara) of Rwanda and is situated in the southwest of the country. The former province had an area of some 2,146 square kilometers. Its population was estimated at 466,451 (1990) and 511,776 (2002) prior to its dissolution in January 2006, with an annual growth rate of .810% between the years of 1990 and 2002. It included 13 "communes" and 125 sectors.

== History ==
=== Kingdom of Rwanda ===
Gikongoro Province was created after Rwanda gained its independence from Belgium in the Rwandan Revolution. The southern and western outlands of Nyanza, the former capital of the Kingdom of Rwanda, became eastern Gikongoro.

=== Rwandan genocide ===
In 1994, at the time of the Rwandan genocide the Tutsi population was concentrated in northern and eastern areas; according to local population statistics, there were almost no Tutsi living in western Gikongoro. In 1990, 17.5% of the population in Gikongoro was Tutsi. Tutsi were unevenly distributed throughout the province; 43% of Tutsi lived in Mubuga, with smaller percentages in Nyamagabe and Muko. There were five sectors with a Tutsi-majority population. The pre-genocide figure of 17.5% may be low due to missing data from Rwamiko. Rwamiko bordered Butare province—according to the 1991 census Butare province was 17.3%. Tutsi, more than any other province. Many of the sectors around Rwamiko were at least 40% Tutsi. There is a discrepancy between the 1990 local population data and 1991 population census. The 1991 census reported that only 12.8% of Gikongoro residents were Tutsi. According to Marijke Verpoorten, a researcher at University of Antwerp, the 1991 census under-reported Tutsi population figures. The Rwandan government stopped reporting ethnic demographic data after the genocide.

According to some estimates, Tutsi men in Gikongoro had only a 25% chance of surviving the genocide. Other estimates have placed the odds even lower, around 10.7%. The genocide was more severe in areas where Tutsi had been persuaded to gather like Kibeho and Kaduha; these parishes were announced as safe locations for Tutsi to gather, but ended up being locations of large scale massacres. The violence was particularly intense in Mubugu and Rukondo. There was very little opposition to the genocide amongst local leadership; those who did object, in areas like Musebeya, Kivu and Kinyamakara, were unable to make a significant difference in the overall progress of the genocide and eventually lost their influence to political rivals who took advantage of the situation. Human Rights Watch (HRW) has identified Gikongoro as the location of some of the "earliest attacks" and "worst massacres" of the Rwandan genocide. The violence spread from Gikongoro to nearby areas, spreading outward from Kigali until it reached Gitarama Province.
