= Christian Davenport =

American political scientist

- Awards: Elected to the American Academy of Arts and Sciences (2018)

Academic background
- Education: Clark University (BA); State University of New York at Binghamton (MA, PhD)

Academic work
- Discipline: Political science
- Sub-discipline: Political violence State repression Human rights Social movements
- Institutions: University of Michigan; University of Notre Dame; University of Maryland, College Park; University of Colorado Boulder; University of Houston
- Notable works: The Death and Life of State Repression; How Social Movements Die

Christian Davenport is an American political scientist, sociologist, writer and professor at the University of Michigan. His fields of research include state repression, human rights violations, political violence, and social movements.

== Education and career ==
Davenport received a Bachelor of Arts with a major in political science from Clark University in Worcester, Massachusetts, in 1987. He received a Masters of Arts in 1990 and a Doctor of Philosophy in 1992, both in political science and from the State University of New York at Binghamton.

He began his academic career at the University of Houston in 1992. He subsequently held positions at the University of Colorado Boulder, the University of Maryland, College Park, and the University of Notre Dame.

Davenport joined the University of Michigan faculty in 2012. On October 16, 2025, the Regents of the University of Michigan approved the appointment of Davenport as the Charles Tilly Distinguished University Professor of Political Science, effective September 1, 2025. Between 2007 and 2025, he held a research appointment at the Peace Research Institute Oslo.

== Research ==
Davenport studies the use of coercion or force by governments, interactions between states and political challengers (e.g., protest and the policing of protest, insurgency and counter-insurgency as well as terrorism and counterterrorism). His work uses quantitative as well as qualitative methods.

In State Repression and the Domestic Democratic Peace (2007), Davenport examined the relationship between democratic institutions, political conflict, and state repression. Media Bias, Perspective and State Repression: The Black Panther Party (2010) compared differing documentary sources concerning government action against the Black Panther Party and discussed how source selection affects the measurement of repression. The book received the 2011 best-book award from the Race, Ethnicity, and Politics section of the American Political Science Association.

His 2015 book How Social Movements Die used the Republic of New Afrika as a case study of repression, internal organization, and movement demobilization. Davenport has also published research on racial differences in the policing of protest in the United States and on the measurement of civilian casualties during armed conflict.

His most recent book, The Death and Life of State Repression with Ben Appel (published in 2022), explores repressive life/death-cycles (i.e., the onset, escalation, termination and recurrence of large-scale state coercion/force).

=== Debate over Rwandan casualty estimates ===
Davenport and political scientist Allan Stam conducted research on deaths associated with the Rwandan genocide and other violence in Rwanda in 1994. Their work received wider public attention after it was featured in the 2014 BBC Two documentary Rwanda's Untold Story. The documentary presented a lower-end estimate of approximately 200,000 Tutsi deaths and questioned commonly cited accounts of the number and ethnic composition of the victims. Other estimates placed the number much higher.

The Rwandan government and parliament accused the documentary of minimizing or denying the genocide and called for action against the BBC. The BBC rejected that characterization, stating that the documentary examined disputed aspects of Rwanda's recent history and contributed to public understanding of the subject.

The casualty estimates were also disputed by scholars. Rwanda specialist Filip Reyntjens, while separately criticizing uncritical accounts of the government of Paul Kagame, wrote that Davenport and Stam had not at that time published sufficient verifiable evidence for the figures presented in the documentary. Legal scholar Roland Moerland argued that the documentary did not adequately distinguish the genocide against the Tutsi from killings committed in other contexts and by different actors.

In a 2020 peer-reviewed analysis, political scientist Omar Shahabudin McDoom estimated that between 491,000 and 522,000 Tutsi were killed. He argued that the lower estimates associated with Davenport and Stam were sensitive to their estimate of Rwanda's pre-genocide Tutsi population, which he considered insufficiently supported.

In a response published in the same journal issue, David Armstrong, Davenport, and Stam stated that the available sources were incomplete, inconsistent, and affected by substantial uncertainty. They distinguished their attempt to estimate total deaths from all forms of violence in Rwanda in 1994 from an estimate limited to genocide victims classified by ethnicity. Depending on how the sources were weighted, their model produced central estimates of approximately 580,000 or 730,000 total deaths, with broad uncertainty intervals. Similar estimates were also provided in the earlier work despite the fact that individuals only tended to discuss the lower-end. Davenport et al. argued that most data available on political violence did not permit a single precise and defensible casualty figure and that a range of values from lower to higher were always the most prudent way to proceed.

Discussions and reflections about the field as well as archival work undertaken in Rwanda were provided in a series of comics called RW-94: Reflections on Rwanda.

== Podcasts and public engagement ==
In 2012, Davenport and Will Moore along with Professors Jaqueline Demeritt, Ragnhild Nordas and Ernesto Verdeja created "Mindfields". The interviewees in this show reflect on the trajectory of their research agendas during the arc of their careers, discussing conflict and peace research.

In 2013/2014, Davenport and Will Moore created the "Conflict Consortium Virtual Workshop". It inspired the Online Peace Science Colloquium created by Emily Ritter and others.

== Professional recognition ==
Davenport was elected to the American Academy of Arts and Sciences in 2018. In 2019, he was elected president of the Peace Science Society (International).

== Selected works ==
- State Repression and the Domestic Democratic Peace. Cambridge University Press. 2007.
- Media Bias, Perspective and State Repression: The Black Panther Party. Cambridge University Press. 2010.
- How Social Movements Die: Repression and Demobilization of the Republic of New Africa. Cambridge University Press. 2015.
- Davenport, Christian; Melander, Erik; Regan, Patrick M. (2018). The Peace Continuum: What It Is and How to Study It. Oxford University Press.
- Davenport, Christian; Ritter, Darick (2019). RW-94: Reflections on Rwanda. New Jack Academics.
- Davenport, Christian; Appel, Benjamin (2022). The Death and Life of State Repression: Understanding Onset, Escalation, Termination, and Recurrence. Oxford University Press.
