= Toronto—Danforth (federal electoral district) =

Federal electoral district in Ontario, Canada

Coordinates: 43.680°N 79.349°W

Ontario electoral district
- Interactive map of riding boundaries from the 2025 federal election

Federal electoral district
- Legislature: House of Commons
MP
Julie Dabrusin
Liberal
- District created: 1976
- First contested: 1979
- Last contested: 2025
- District webpage: profile, map

Demographics
- Population (2021): 105,472
- Electors (2015): 76,567
- Area (km²): 19.75
- Pop. density (per km²): 5,340.4
- Census division: Toronto
- Census subdivision: Toronto (part)

Toronto–Danforth (formerly Broadview–Greenwood) is a federal electoral district in Ontario, Canada, that has been represented in the House of Commons of Canada since 1979. It lies to the east of Downtown Toronto.

Historically, the riding has tilted to the left, particularly since the 1990s. Most election contests take place between the NDP and the Liberal Party. Even with the end of vote-splitting on the centre-right, the Conservatives are almost nonexistent in the riding; no Conservative candidate has crossed the 15 percent mark, until recently in the 2025 federal election, Conservative candidate Ashik Hussain finished second place with 19% of the vote, ahead of NDP candidate Clare Hacksel.

The NDP held the riding for the first nine years of its existence before Liberal Dennis Mills won the seat in 1988 and held it during the long period of Liberal dominance of the federal scene. He was unseated in 2004 by Layton, who had previously run against Mills in 1997. Layton held the seat until his death on August 22, 2011. The seat was vacant until a by-election on March 29, 2012, which was won by NDP candidate and human rights lawyer Craig Scott. However, Scott was narrowly defeated by Liberal Julie Dabrusin in the 2015 election in a major upset.

== Demographics ==
Toronto–Danforth includes an array of ethnicities, including large Greek, Chinese, and South Asian communities, many of the latter of whom are Muslims. It has the highest percentage of ethnic Greeks among all Toronto ridings (7.3%).

== History ==
The riding was created in 1976 as "Broadview—Greenwood" from parts of Broadview and York East and a small part of Greenwood.

It consisted initially of the part of the Municipality of Metropolitan Toronto bounded on the south by Queen Street East, on the west by the Don River, and on the east and north by a line drawn north from Queen Street along Jones Avenue, east along Gerrard Street East, north along Greenwood Avenue, west along O'Connor Drive, north along Don Mills Road to the Don River.

In 1987, it was redefined to consist of the part of the City of Toronto and the Borough of East York bounded on the west by the Don River, on the south by Queen Street, and on the east and north by a line drawn from the lake north along Leslie Street, east along Queen Street East, north along Greenwood Avenue, east along Danforth Avenue, north along Coxwell Avenue and Coxwell Boulevard, and west along Taylor Creek and the Don River East Branch to the Don River.

In 1996, it was defined to consist of the parts of the City of Toronto and the Borough of East York north along Leslie Street, east along Queen Street East, north along Greenwood Avenue, east along Gerrard Street East, north along Coxwell Avenue and Coxwell Boulevard, west along Taylor Creek, the Don River East Branch and the Don River, northwest along Millwood Road, southwest along the Canadian Pacific Railway and the eastern limit of the City of Toronto, south along the Don River to Toronto Harbour.

The name of the electoral district was changed in 2000 to "Toronto—Danforth" on the suggestion of Dennis Mills, the riding's Member of Parliament. Many local citizens were upset at the name change, particularly because of the lack of public say in the matter. Layton sought neighbourhood input for another name change to the riding, but the name was not changed.

In 2003, it was given its current boundaries, which consist of the part of the City of Toronto bounded on the south by Lake Ontario and Toronto Harbour, on the east by Coxwell Avenue and Coxwell Boulevard, on the north by Taylor Creek and the Don River East Branch, and on the west by the Don River. This riding was unchanged after the 2012 electoral redistribution.

=== Former boundaries ===
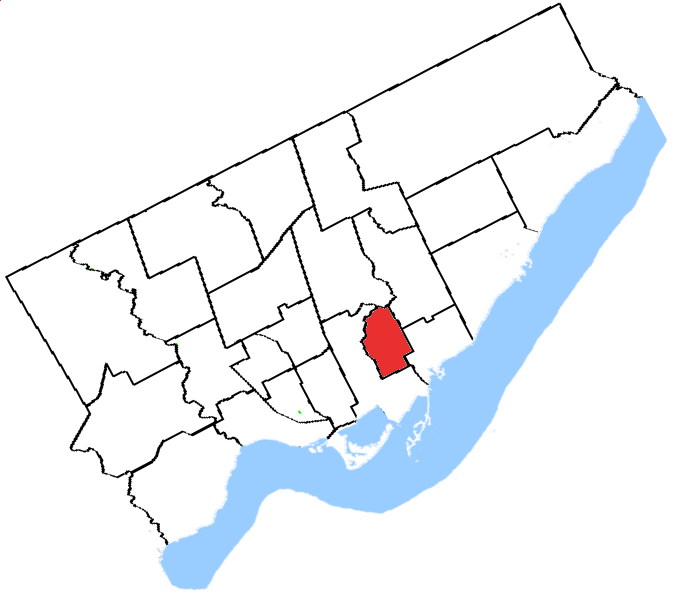
1976 to 1987

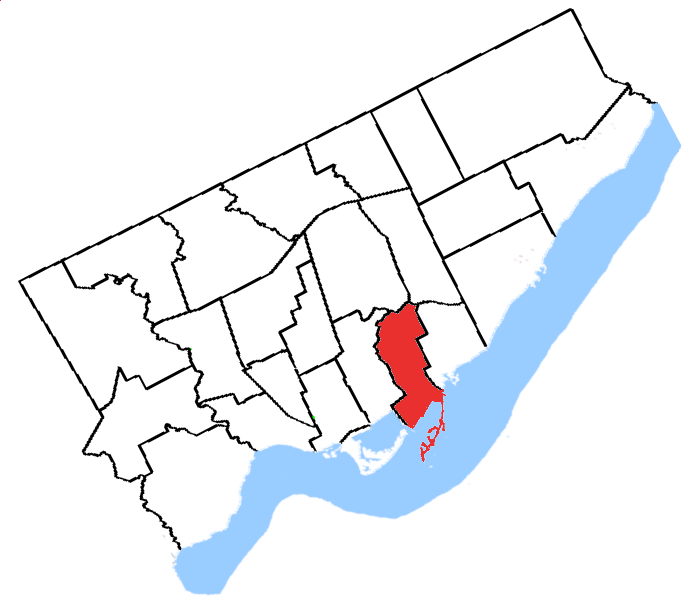
1987 to 1996

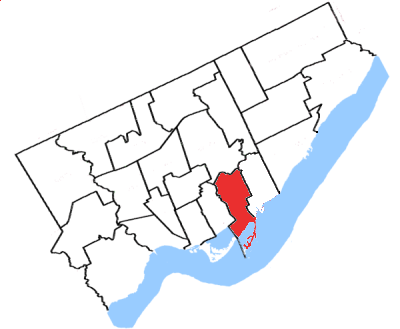
1996 to 2003

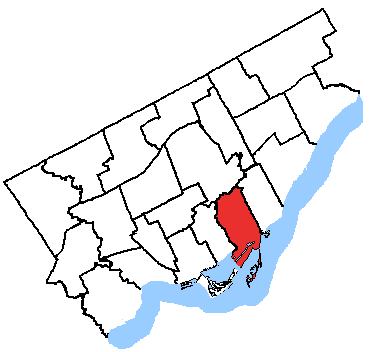
2003 to 2015

== Members of Parliament ==
This riding has elected the following members of Parliament:

Parliament	Years	Member	Party
Broadview—Greenwood; Riding created from Broadview, York East and Greenwood
31st	1979–1980	Bob Rae	New Democratic
32nd	1980–1982	Bob Rae	New Democratic
32nd	1982–1984	Lynn McDonald	New Democratic
33rd	1984–1988	Lynn McDonald	New Democratic
34th	1988–1993	Dennis Mills	Liberal
35th	1993–1997	Dennis Mills	Liberal
36th	1997–2000	Dennis Mills	Liberal
Toronto—Danforth
37th	2000–2004	Dennis Mills	Liberal
38th	2004–2006	Jack Layton	New Democratic
39th	2006–2008	Jack Layton	New Democratic
40th	2008–2011	Jack Layton	New Democratic
41st	2011–2011	Jack Layton	New Democratic
41st	2012–2015	Craig Scott	New Democratic
42nd	2015–2019	Julie Dabrusin	Liberal
43rd	2019–2021	Julie Dabrusin	Liberal
44th	2021–2025	Julie Dabrusin	Liberal
45th	2025–present	Julie Dabrusin	Liberal

== Election results ==
Graph of general election results in Broadview—Greenwood (1976–2000), and Toronto—Danforth (2000–present) (minor parties that never got 2% of the vote or didn't run consistently are omitted) View source data.

=== Toronto—Danforth, 2000–present ===
Graph of general election results in Toronto—Danforth (2000-present) (minor parties that never got 2% of the vote or didn't run consistently are omitted) View source data.

2025 Canadian federal election
Party	Candidate	Votes	%	±%	Expenditures
Liberal	Julie Dabrusin	38,794	66.56	+18.20	
Conservative	Ashik Hussain	11,060	18.98	+6.42	
New Democratic	Clare Hacksel	7,554	12.96	–20.71	
Green	Silvia Stardust	625	1.07	–0.89	
Animal Protection	Liz White	250	0.43	+0.05	
Total valid votes/expense limit					
Total rejected ballots					
Turnout		58,283	71.16		
Eligible voters		81,901			
Liberal notional hold		Swing		+5.89	
Source: Elections Canada

2021 federal election redistributed results
Party	Vote	%
Liberal	25,216	48.36
New Democratic	17,556	33.67
Conservative	6,548	12.56
People's	1,282	2.46
Green	1,023	1.96
Others	521	1.00

2021 Canadian federal election
Party	Candidate	Votes	%	±%	Expenditures
Liberal	Julie Dabrusin	23,038	48.41	+0.58	$77,319.65
New Democratic	Clare Hacksel	15,881	33.28	+0.08	$94,784.85
Conservative	Michael Carey	6,105	12.83	+2.29	$25,348.44
People's	Wayne Simmons	1,238	2.59	+1.49	$766.61
Green	Maryem Tollar	949	1.99	-4.51	$2,899.08
Communist	Elizabeth Rowley	204	0.43	+0.13	$0.00
Animal Protection	Liz White	179	0.38	-0.02	$3,315.07
Independent	Habiba Desai	125	0.26		$510.82
Total valid votes/expense limit		47,719	–	–	$110,583.29
Total rejected ballots					
Turnout		47,719	59.84		
Eligible voters		79,749			
Liberal hold		Swing		+0.25	
Source: Elections Canada

2019 Canadian federal election
Party	Candidate	Votes	%	±%	Expenditures
Liberal	Julie Dabrusin	27,681	47.68	+5.34	$75,766
New Democratic	Min Sook Lee	19,283	33.21	-6.96	$102,067
Conservative	Zia Choudhary	6,091	10.49	+0.63	$19,351
Green	Chris Tolley	3,761	6.48	+1.77	
People's	Tara Dos Remedios	621	1.07	-	$3,633
Animal Protection	Elizabeth Abbott	261	0.45	-0.19	$2,645
Independent	John Kladitis	210	0.36	-	$2,953
Communist	Ivan Byard	151	0.26	-	
Total valid votes/expense limit		58,059	100.0		
Total rejected ballots		413			
Turnout		58,472	71.9		
Eligible voters		81,283			
Liberal hold		Swing		+6.15	
Source: Elections Canada

2015 Canadian federal election
Party	Candidate	Votes	%	±%	Expenditures
Liberal	Julie Dabrusin	23,531	42.34	+24.75	$76,557.98
New Democratic	Craig Scott	22,325	40.17	-20.70	$177,088.37
Conservative	Benjamin Dichter	5,478	9.86	-4.44	$7,898.04
Green	Chris Tolley	2,618	4.71	-1.74	$8,441.33
Progressive Canadian	John Richardson	1,275	2.29	–	–
Animal Alliance	Elizabeth Abbott	354	0.64	–	$216.83
Total valid votes/expense limit		55,581	100.00		$210,111.71
Total rejected ballots		269	0.48	–	
Turnout		55,850	72.38	–	
Eligible voters		77,158			
Liberal gain from New Democratic		Swing		+22.73	
Source: Elections Canada

Canadian federal by-election, March 19, 2012 Death of Jack Layton
Party	Candidate	Votes	%	±%	Expenditures
New Democratic	Craig Scott	19,210	59.44	−1.36	$ 82,847.22
Liberal	Grant Gordon	9,215	28.51	+10.89	86,016.54
Conservative	Andrew Keyes	1,736	5.37	−8.95	73,735.56
Green	Adriana Mugnatto-Hamu	1,517	4.69	−1.77	57,955.38
Progressive Canadian	Dorian Baxter	208	0.64	–	1,473.73
Libertarian	John C. Recker	133	0.41	–	2,433.05
Independent	Leslie Bory	77	0.24	–	898.69
Canadian Action	Christopher Porter	75	0.23	–	3,163.57
Independent	John Turmel	57	0.18	–	–
United	Brian Jedan	55	0.17	–	130.18
Independent	Bahman Yazdanfar	36	0.11	–	622.86
Total valid votes/expense limit		32,319	100.00		$ 86,821.95
Total rejected ballots		150	0.46	−0.13	
Turnout		32,469	43.58	−21.32	
New Democratic hold		Swing		−6.13	
Source(s) "By-election March 19, 2012 – Official Voting Results". Elections Canada. "Financial Reports: Candidate's Electoral Campaign Return – March 19, 2012 By-election".

2011 Canadian federal election
Party	Candidate	Votes	%	±%	Expenditures
New Democratic	Jack Layton	29,235	60.80	+16.02	$ 71,037.96
Liberal	Andrew Lang	8,472	17.62	-11.76	62,218.04
Conservative	Katarina Von Koenig	6,885	14.32	+2.67	4,113.58
Green	Adriana Mugnatto-Hamu	3,107	6.46	-6.75	47,241.28
Animal Alliance	Marie Crawford	387	0.80	+0.41	–
Total valid votes/expense limit		48,086	100.00	–	$ 84,621.69
Total rejected ballots		284	0.59	+0.17	
Turnout		48,370	64.90	+3.99	
New Democratic hold		Swing		+13.89	
Source(s) "Official Voting Results – Forty-First General Election 2011". (Table 12). "Financial Reports: Candidate's Electoral Campaign Return". Elections Canada.

2008 Canadian federal election
Party	Candidate	Votes	%	±%	Expenditures
New Democratic	Jack Layton	20,323	44.78	-3.64	$ 79,280.87
Liberal	Andrew Lang	13,336	29.38	-4.85	65,423.39
Green	Sharon Howarth	5,995	13.21	+6.10	37,793.55
Conservative	Christina Perreault	5,287	11.65	+1.75	16,514.92
Animal Alliance	Marie Crawford	175	0.39	–	–
Independent	John Richardson	130	0.29	–	38.98
Marxist–Leninist	Marcell Rodden	87	0.19	-0.15	–
Canadian Action	Bahman Yazdanfar	54	0.12	–	125.00
Total valid votes/expense limit		45,387	100.00	–	$ 82,496.98
Total rejected ballots		191	0.42	-0.06	
Turnout		45,578	60.91	-6.76	
New Democratic hold		Swing		+0.61	
Source(s) "Official Voting Results – Fortieth General Election 2008". (Table 12). "Financial Reports: Candidate's Electoral Campaign Return". Elections Canada.

2006 Canadian federal election
Party	Candidate	Votes	%	±%	Expenditures
New Democratic	Jack Layton	24,412	48.42	+2.08	$ 74,966.33
Liberal	Deborah Coyne	17,256	34.23	-7.11	74,304.11
Conservative	Kren Clausen	4,992	9.90	+3.69	32,138.91
Green	Al Hart	3,583	7.11	+1.73	6,770.73
Marxist–Leninist	Marcell Rodden	172	0.34	+0.16	–
Total valid votes/expense limit		50,415	100.00	–	$ 76,419.79
Total rejected ballots		242	0.48	-0.08	
Turnout		50,657	67.67	+3.57	
New Democratic hold		Swing		+4.6	
Source(s) "Official Voting Results – Thirty-ninth General Election". (Table 12). "Financial Reports: Candidate's Electoral Campaign Return". Elections Canada.

2004 Canadian federal election
Party	Candidate	Votes	%	±%	Expenditures
New Democratic	Jack Layton	22,198	46.34	+18.69	$ 72,751.01
Liberal	Dennis Mills	19,803	41.34	-10.56	73,909.41
Conservative	Loftus Cuddy	2,975	6.21	-9.51	12,400.00
Green	Jim Harris	2,575	5.38	+3.42	11,139.51
Marijuana	Scott Yee	265	0.55	-0.76	–
Marxist–Leninist	Marcell Rodden	84	0.18	-0.03	–
Total valid votes/expense limit		47,900	100.00		$ 75,271.84
Total rejected ballots		269	0.56		
Turnout		48,169	64.10		
New Democratic gain from Liberal		Swing		+14.63	
Source(s) "Official Voting Results – Thirty-eighth General Election". (Table 12). "Financial Reports: Candidate's Electoral Campaign Return". Elections Canada.

Note: Change from 2000 for top three parties is based on redistributed results. Conservative Party change is based on the total of Canadian Alliance and Progressive Conservative Party votes.

2000 Canadian federal election
Party	Candidate	Votes	%	±%
Liberal	Dennis Mills	20,330	51.90	+2.14
New Democratic	Paula Turtle	10,830	27.65	-5.12
Progressive Conservative	Rose A. Dyson	3,138	8.01	+0.38
Alliance	Chris Butryn	3,021	7.71	+0.06
Green	Robert Nevin	769	1.96	+0.96
Marijuana	Sean Keir	513	1.31	–
Canadian Action	William Angus Millar	202	0.52	–
Natural Law	Linda Martin	154	0.39	-0.09
Communist	Miguel Figueroa	129	0.33	–
Marxist–Leninist	Melanie Cishecki	82	0.21	+0.01
Total valid votes		39,168	100.00	–

Note: Canadian Alliance vote is compared to the Reform vote in 1997 election.

=== Broadview—Greenwood, 1976–2000 ===
Graph of general election results in Broadview—Greenwood (1976–2000) (minor parties that never got 2% of the vote or didn't run consistently are omitted) View source data.

1997 Canadian federal election
Party	Candidate	Votes	%	±%
Liberal	Dennis Mills	21,108	49.76	-11.31
New Democratic	Jack Layton	13,903	32.77	+18.82
Reform	Brian Higgins	3,247	7.65	-3.64
Progressive Conservative	Dianne Garrels	3,238	7.63	-1.71
Green	Karen McCarthy	426	1.00	–
Independent	Kevin Mark Clarke	211	0.50	–
Natural Law	Bob Hyman	205	0.48	-0.53
Marxist–Leninist	Gurdev Singh	85	0.20	-0.04
Total valid votes		42,423	100.00	–

1993 Canadian federal election
Party	Candidate	Votes	%	±%
Liberal	Dennis Mills	23,558	61.07	+22.18
New Democratic	Lynn McDonald	5,381	13.95	-22.01
Reform	Frank Meyers	4,356	11.29	–
Progressive Conservative	John Papadakis	3,601	9.34	-13.08
National	Barbara A. Sim	976	2.53	–
Natural Law	Bob Hyman	389	1.01	–
Independent	Elizabeth Rowley	148	0.38	–
Marxist–Leninist	Manuel Gitterman	92	0.24	–
Abolitionist	Brian Blonski	74	0.19	–
Total valid votes		38,575	100.00	–

1988 Canadian federal election
Party	Candidate	Votes	%	±%
Liberal	Dennis Mills	15,808	38.89	+20.55
New Democratic	Lynn McDonald	14,616	35.96	-9.63
Progressive Conservative	Wayne Allan Shillinglaw	9,112	22.42	-12.25
Libertarian	Byron J. Garby	431	1.06	–
Green	Elizabeth Rhodes	296	0.73	+0.01
Rhinoceros	Hank Wright Snell	243	0.60	-0.08
Commonwealth of Canada	David S. Moyer	137	0.34	–
Total valid votes		40,643	100.00	–

1984 Canadian federal election
Party	Candidate	Votes	%	±%
New Democratic	Lynn McDonald	15,066	45.59	+6.48
Progressive Conservative	Peter Worthington	11,455	34.67	-15.26
Liberal	Ken Paige	6,060	18.34	+8.61
Green	Rolf Tegtmeyer	239	0.72	–
Rhinoceros	Nora Rodden	224	0.68	+0.36
Total valid votes		33,044	100.00	–

Note: the popular vote of Progressive Conservative candidate Peter Worthington is compared to the total popular vote in the 1982 by-election earned by the PC candidate Bill Fatsis and by Mr. Worthington running without affiliation.

Canadian federal by-election, October 12, 1982: Toronto-Danforth
Party	Candidate	Votes	%	±%
New Democratic	Lynn McDonald	10,967	39.11	-1.26
Independent	Peter Worthington	9,004	32.11	–
Progressive Conservative	Bill Fatsis	4,999	17.82	-6.10
Liberal	Dave O'Connor	2,728	9.73	-23.31
Independent	Donald Y. Hsu	159	0.57	–
Rhinoceros	Terry The Pirate Roche	90	0.32	-0.29
Independent	Christopher R.C. Boddy	41	0.15	–
Independent	Sydney Thompson	38	0.14	–
Independent	John Turmel	19	0.07	–
Total valid votes		28,045	100.00	–

1980 Canadian federal election
Party	Candidate	Votes	%	±%
New Democratic	Bob Rae	12,953	40.37	+0.65
Liberal	Philippe Gigantès	10,601	33.04	+5.06
Progressive Conservative	Michael Clarke	7,677	23.92	-6.16
Libertarian	Walter Belej	352	1.10	-0.33
Rhinoceros	Vicki Butterfield	196	0.61	–
Communist	Ed McDonald	164	0.51	+0.07
Independent	Don Hayward	53	0.17	–
Marxist–Leninist	Dorothy J. O'Donnell	53	0.17	0.00
Independent	Milorad Novich	40	0.12	-0.07
Total valid votes		32,089	100.00	–

1979 Canadian federal election
Party	Candidate	Votes	%
New Democratic	Bob Rae	13,187	39.72
Progressive Conservative	Michael Clarke	9,987	30.08
Liberal	Philipp Varelis	9,290	27.98
Libertarian	Walter Belej	474	1.43
Communist	John Bizzell	145	0.44
Independent	Milorad Novich	64	0.19
Marxist–Leninist	Dorothy J. O'Donnell	57	0.17
Total valid votes		33,204	100.00

== See also ==
- List of Canadian electoral districts
- Historical federal electoral districts of Canada
