= Giti =

Giti may refer to:

- Giti Pashaei, an Iranian singer and actress.
- Giti Tire, a Singaporean-Indonesian tire brand and company.
