= Huguenot Society of Canada =

The Huguenot Society of Canada is an organization which published the Huguenot Trails publication from 1968 to 2003. In 1985, it organized a conference to study Huguenot heritage in Canada.
