= Gerald Caplan =

Canadian academic, public policy analyst, commentator and political activist

Gerald Lewis "Gerry" Caplan (born 8 March 1938) is a Canadian academic, public policy analyst, commentator, and political activist. He has had a varied career in academia, as a political organizer for the New Democratic Party, in advocacy around education, broadcasting and African affairs and as a commentator in various Canadian media.

Caplan is the author of Rwanda: The Preventable Genocide (2000), written for the Organization of African Unity's International Panel of Eminent Personalities to Investigate the 1994 Rwandan genocide. He is considered a leading expert on genocide.

== Education and background ==
Caplan has a Masters in Canadian history from the University of Toronto and a doctorate in African history from the School of Oriental and African Studies, University of London. His Masters thesis was Co-operative Commonwealth Federation in Ontario, 1932-1945: a study of socialist and anti-socialist politics and was later revised and published in book form in 1973 as The Dilemma of Canadian Socialism : The CCF in Ontario. His doctoral thesis was also published as The Elites of Barotseland: A History of Zambia's Western Province.

From 1967 to 1977, Caplan was an associate professor in the Department of History and Philosophy of Education at the Ontario Institute for Studies in Education. Subsequently, he was director of CUSO's volunteer program in Nigeria.

== Political career ==
Caplan has been a political activist all his life as a member of the CCF and its successor, the NDP. He was campaign manager in a series of election campaigns, both federal and provincial, including those for Ontario leader Donald C. MacDonald and national party leader David Lewis. A lifelong friend of David's son Stephen Lewis, he was also a close advisor and senior strategist to Lewis prior to and during his career as leader of the Ontario New Democratic Party in the 1970s. After a period serving as co-ordinator of Toronto's health advocacy unit from 1980 to 1982, Caplan returned to political work. From 1982 to 1984, Caplan was federal secretary of the New Democratic Party, and was national campaign manager for the 1984 general election.

In 1982, Caplan was a candidate for the federal NDP nomination in Broadview—Greenwood after Bob Rae vacated the seat to move to provincial politics. Caplan was upset in his bid for the nomination by Lynn McDonald, who defeated Caplan on the third ballot by a margin of 309 votes to 248. McDonald went on to keep the seat for the NDP in the ensuing by-election.

== Broadcasting ==
In 1985, Caplan was co-chair of the Task Force on Canadian Broadcasting Policy by then-Prime Minister Brian Mulroney. For many years he remained vocal in defence of public broadcasting, some of it with the lobby group Friends of Canadian Broadcasting.

== Media ==
He worked as a political columnist for the Toronto Star from the mid-1980s for a number of years, and was often on television and radio as a political pundit supporting the NDP. He was a member of the long-running Thursday morning Pundits' Panel on CTV Television's morning program, Canada AM. Following the 1988 federal election, he co-authored Election: the issues, the strategies, the aftermath with Liberal strategist Michael Kirby and Tory strategist Hugh Segal.

Caplan contributed opinion pieces to various Canadian newspapers including The Star and The Globe and Mail until 2018. Also, he was a regular panelist on CBC News Network's Power & Politics in the 2010s.

== Royal Commission on Learning ==
From 1993 to 1995, Caplan was co-chair of Ontario's Royal Commission on Learning having been appointed to the position by Ontario Premier Bob Rae. Prior to the 1999 Ontario election he served as the Director of Research for the Ontario NDP caucus.

== Africa ==
In 1999, Caplan was recruited to work on a study of the Rwandan genocide for the OAU, later published as The Preventable Genocide. He then turned full-time to African matters.

After completing the report on the genocide, he founded and became the co-coordinator of Remembering Rwanda, an international movement of volunteers dedicated to commemorating the tenth anniversary of the genocide. He has remained active around issues related to Rwanda and genocide prevention in general, frequently speaking and writing about both. In 2001, he was named by the United Nations' Special Coordinator for Africa as a member of the senior experts' team undertaking an evaluation of the UN's New Agenda for the Development of Africa in the 1990s. He has also acted as a consultant for the Economic Commission for Africa, UNICEF, WHO and the African Union.

He served, as well, as volunteer chair of the International Advisory Board for the University of Toronto Centre for International Health's HIV/AIDS Initiative, and is part of the small team that supports Stephen Lewis in his work as UN Special Envoy for HIV/AIDS in Africa.

Caplan has denounced the Roman Catholic Church on what he says is the notorious role of the institution in setting the stage for, enabling and ultimately participating in the genocide in Rwanda.

Caplan states that he once gave a speech critical of Rwanda's governing party, the RPF, after which he "was instantly transformed from a warmly-embraced 'friend of Rwanda' into persona non grata".

== Publications ==
- Editorials from Pambazuka News, Oxford: Pambazuka Press
- Caplan, G (2008) The Betrayal of Africa, Groundwood Books
- Caplan, G (2005) Why We Must Never Forget the Rwandan Genocide in Manji, F and Burnett, P (eds) African Voices on Development and Social Justice
- Caplan, G (2005) Some Reminders of the International Response to the Crisis in Manji, F and Burnett, P (eds) African Voices on Development and Social Justice
- Caplan, G (1970) The elites of Barotseland, 1878-1969: a political history of Zambia's Western Province, London: Hurst
