= Marijke Verpoorten =

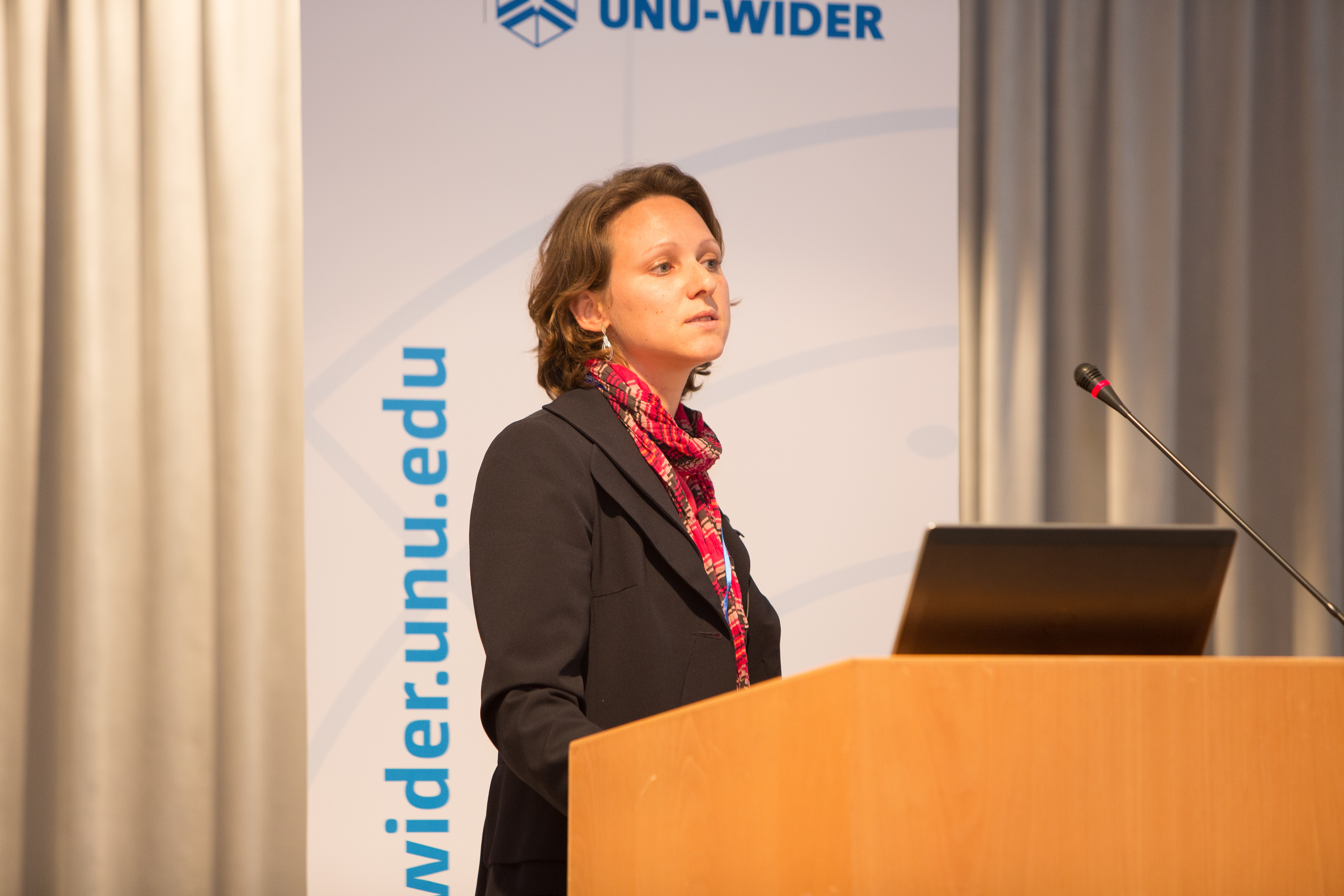
Marijke Verpoorten

Marijke Verpoorten is a researcher and professor at the University of Antwerp. She received a PhD in Economics from the University of Leuven. Her research has focused on development economics, economic causes of armed conflicts, global supply chains, natural resources and religion, particular in Rwanda, Benin and the Democratic Republic of the Congo. She also teaches economic and institutional development at the Catholic University of Bukavu and development economics at the African school of Economics in Benin.

Verpoorten is affiliated with the following groups: LICOS, EUDN, NEPS, Annuaire des Grands Lacs, and Journal of Peace Science.

Verpoorten began her work on Rwanda in 2002 by collecting household data in Gikongoro and Gitarama. Part of this early work was published in a paper concerning the estimation of the death toll in Gikingoro during the Rwandan genocide. She had published on many topics pertaining to Rwanda, including its coffee sector, the impact of the Rwandan armed conflict on education and post-War recovery. Verpoorten wrote her dissertation, “Conflict and Survival: an Analysis of Shocks, Coping Strategies and Economic Mobility in Rwanda” from 1990-2002. It studied post war Rwanda. It also studied how war affects education.

She has also written about fisheries in Benin. She also studied food safety standards in Benin. Benin was banned to export to the EU due to breaking food safety laws. She studied how this impacted the EU market.
