= Allan C. Stam =

American political scientist

- Occupations: Political scientist, educator, and writer

Academic background
- Education: B.A., Government; M.A., Political Science; Ph.D., Political Science
- Alma mater: Cornell University; University of Michigan

Allan C. Stam is an American political scientist, educator, and writer. He serves as a university professor at the University of Virginia and holds the position of professor of Politics and Public Policy at the Frank Batten School.

Stam's research investigates the dynamics of armed conflict both within and between nations, focusing on war outcomes, durations, mediation, and the politics of alliances. His published work includes articles in political science journals including International Security, the British Journal of Political Science, and the American Political Science Review, and co-authored books such as, Democracies at War, The Behavioral Origins of War, and Why Leaders Fight.

Stam has contributed to projects for the US Department of Defense and the United States Navy's Joint Warfare Analysis Center and conducted surveys in Russia, Rwanda, India, and the U.S. His research on the Rwandan genocide, featured in a BBC documentary, and his work in Gujarat, India, where he assisted in surveying 120,000 households across 1,800 villages to track discrimination and violence against sub-caste populations, provide insights into Indian Caste discrimination. He has received awards, including the 2004 International Studies Association's Karl Deutsch Award, presented annually to a scholar who is judged to have the most significant contribution to the study of International Relations and Peace Research, 2011 American Political Science Association J. David Singer Data Innovation Award, and the Victoire Ingabire Umuhoza Prize for Democracy and Peace from the International Women's Network for Democracy and Peace in 2020.

== Education and early career ==
Stam earned a B.A. in government from Cornell University in 1988. Prior to his time at Cornell, he served as a communications specialist on an 'A' detachment of the United States Army Special Forces and later served as an armor officer in the United States Army Reserve. He pursued further studies at the University of Michigan, receiving an M.A. in Political Science in 1991, and a Ph.D. in the same field in 1993.

== Career ==
Stam began his academic career as an assistant professor at American University from 1993 to 1996 and at Yale University from 1996 to 2000. In 2000, he was appointed an associate professor in the Government Department at Dartmouth College, later becoming professor in 2004 and Daniel Webster Professor from 2005 to 2007, while also working as a visiting associate professor at Harvard University in 2004 and as a residential fellow at the Center for Advanced Study in the Behavioral Sciences at Stanford University. He then joined the University of Michigan as a faculty associate and research professor in the Center for Political Studies from 2007 to 2014, after which he continued as a professor at the University of Virginia Batten School. He has been a university professor and senior faculty fellow in the Miller Center of Public Affairs at the University of Virginia since 2020.

Stam served as director of the International Policy Center at the University of Michigan from 2012 to 2014. In 2014, he took on the position of dean of the Batten School at the University of Virginia, serving until 2019.

== Works ==
Stam's research has examined the relationship between democracy and war, leadership dynamics, and the Rwandan genocide and civil conflict. His work on war outcomes, mediation, and alliance politics has been published in political science journals and books, and he has received grants, including those for comparative theory testing, interstate wars, and collaborative research on the expected utility theory of war.

=== Democracy and the nature of war ===
Building on his research interests, Stam studied why democracies win wars–focused on military effectiveness, and concluded that superior logistics, initiative, and leadership led to stronger battlefield performance. However, he highlighted that these advantages diminished in prolonged conflicts, and after 18 months of war, autocracies persisted and ultimately gained the upper hand through their military-industrial capacity and strategy. In 1999, he published Win, Lose, Or Draw: Domestic Politics and the Crucible of War. He argued that war outcomes are shaped not only by resources but, crucially, by domestic politics and strategy choice. Subsequently, in 2002, he co-wrote a book titled Democracies at War, which Brandon Valeriano described as "an important empirical contribution to the fields of political science and military strategy."

=== Leaders and leadership ===
Stam's 2005 study documented that older leaders were likelier to initiate and escalate militarized disputes, particularly in democracies and intermediate regimes, excluding personalist regimes. He found that leaders with military service and former rebels were more likely to initiate militarized disputes, while combat veterans did so mainly in weak civilian regimes. He further emphasized that leader attributes, particularly combat experience, influenced their military assessments and threat effectiveness in international conflicts. In his book, Why Leaders Fight, he explored how national leaders' life experiences and personal traits shaped their decisions on war and peace. Kirkus Reviews stated that the book was willing to challenge tradition without using "strident rhetoric." They further added, "This is a valuable contribution to the study of leadership and international relations in general." In 2004, he co-authored The Behavioral Origins of War, which Philip A. Schrodt praised as "potentially the last important one," and Lawrence D. Freedman noted that the authors "offer an ever more refined analysis."

=== Rwandan genocide and civil war ===
Stam served as co-principal investigator for a National Science Foundation-funded Genocide and Resistance project in Rwanda. Between 1998 and 1999, while working with the U.S. Agency for International Development, he and his colleagues assessed the 1994 genocide, which may have claimed 1 million lives. He and his collaborator, Christian Davenport, gathered data from the National University of Rwanda, conducted surveys, and interviewed government elites. Despite documenting the genocide, he was labeled a 'genocide denier' by the Rwandan government. In addition, he collaborated with both the prosecution and defense at the International Criminal Tribunal for Rwanda and uncovered data from NGOs documenting the 100 days of violence. He underscored that various forms of political violence occurred simultaneously and involved both the Hutu government and the Rwandan Patriotic Front, with the majority of victims likely being Hutu. Furthermore, his findings revealed that killings occurred nationwide with varying rates and magnitude, and a comparison of the 1991 census with violence data suggested that over half of the 800,000–1 million killed were Hutu, challenging the view that genocide was the sole motive.

== Awards and honors ==
- 1998 – Best Research Software Award, American Political Science Association
- 2004 – Karl Deutsch Award, International Studies Association
- 2011 – J. David Singer Data Innovation Award, The American Political Science Association
- 2019 – Academic All-Star, Moneyball For Government
- 2020 – Victoire Ingibire Umuhoza Prize for Democracy and Peace, International Women's Network for Democracy and Peace (RIFDP)

== Bibliography ==
=== Books ===
- Win, Lose, Or Draw: Domestic Politics and the Crucible of War (1999) ISBN 9780472085774
- Power Transitions: Strategies for the 21st Century (2000) ISBN 9781889119434
- Democracies at War (2002) ISBN 9780691089492
- The Behavioral Origins of War (2004) ISBN 9780472068449
- Why Leaders Fight (2015) ISBN 9781316412084

=== Selected articles ===
- Bennett, D. S., & Stam, A. C. (1996). The duration of interstate wars, 1816–1985. American Political Science Review, 90(2), 239–257.
- Bennett, S. D., & Stam III, A. C. (1998). The declining advantages of democracy: A combined model of war outcomes and duration. Journal of Conflict Resolution, 42(3), 344–366.
- Reiter, D., & Stam, A. C. (1998). Democracy, war initiation, and victory. American Political Science Review, 92(2), 377–389.
- Bennett, D. S., & Stam, A. C. (2000). EUGene: A conceptual manual. International interactions, 26(2), 179–204.
- Smith, A., & Stam, A. C. (2004). Bargaining and the Nature of War. Journal of Conflict Resolution, 48(6), 783–813.
- Horowitz, M. C., & Stam, A. C. (2014). How prior military experience influences the future militarized behavior of leaders. International Organization, 68(3), 527–559.
- Bennett, D. S., Poast, P., & Stam, A. C. (2019). NewGene: An introduction for users. Journal of Conflict Resolution, 63(6), 1579–1592.
