= Rowell =

Rowell is a surname. Notable people with the surname include:

- Bama Rowell (1916–1993), American baseball player
- Chester Rowell (1844–1912), physician, founder of the Fresno Republican newspaper, California State Senator, and University of California Regent; brother of Jonathan
- Chester Harvey Rowell (1867–1948), editor and then manager of the Fresno Morning Republican; son of Jonathan
- Fred Rowell (1918–1988), English footballer
- Galen Rowell (1940–2002), American wilderness photographer and climber
- Gary Rowell (1957–2025), English football player and commentator
- Geoffrey Rowell (1943–2017), Anglican cleric, third Bishop of Gibraltar in Europe
- George P. Rowell (1838–1908), American advertising executive and publisher
- Jack Rowell (1936–2024), English rugby administrator
- Jack Rowell (photographer) (born 1955), American photographer
- James Rowell (1851–1941), English-born Australian politician
- John Samuel Rowell (1825–1907), Wisconsin inventor and manufacturer of farm machinery
- Jonathan H. Rowell (1833–1908), American politician from Illinois
- Jonny Rowell (born 1989), English footballer
- Marc Rowell (1938–2018), Australian politician
- Milo Rowell (1903–1977), American lawyer and Army officer best known for his role in drafting the Constitution of Japan
- Newton Rowell (1867–1941), Canadian lawyer, politician, and lay figure in the Methodist church
- Peter Rowell (born 1958), English broadcaster
- Roger de Rowell, English medieval university chancellor
- Roger M. Rowell (born 1939), American academic and wood scientist
- Ross E. Rowell (1884–1947), United States Marine Corps aviator
- Sarah Rowell (born 1962), British long-distance runner
- Sydney Rowell (1894–1975), Australian soldier who served as Chief of the General Staff
- Ted Rowell (footballer) (1876–1965), Australian footballer
- Theodore H. Rowell (1905–1979), American pharmaceutical industrialist and politician
- Victoria Rowell (born 1960), American actress
- William Rowell (1869–1916), English cricket and rugby union player

== See also ==
- David Rowell & Co. British civil engineering contractor particularly noted for small suspension bridges
- Rowell-Sirois Commission, Canadian Royal Commission looking into the Canadian economy and federal-provincial relations from 1937 to 1940
- Rowell Laboratories, Inc. pharmaceutical manufacturing company founded in 1935 in Baudette, Minnesota
- Rowell's syndrome, cutaneous condition, a form of cutaneous lupus erythematosus
- USS Richard M. Rowell (DE-403), destroyer escort acquired by the United States Navy during World War II
