= Henry Jackman (disambiguation) =

Henry Jackman (born 1974) is an English composer and conductor.

Henry Jackman may also refer to:

- Henry Jackman (MP) for Westbury, Calne and Hindon
- Hal Jackman (born 1932), Canadian businessman and politician
- Harry Jackman (1900–1979), Canadian politician and entrepreneur
