= Eric Jackman =

Canadian psychologist (born 1934)

Eric Jackman CM, OOnt, CD, OMC
- Born: Frederic Langford Rowell Jackman; May 17, 1934 (age 91)
- Occupations: Psychologist; businessman
- Known for: Psychology Foundation of Canada; Dr. Eric Jackman Institute of Child Study; Canadian Journalism Foundation
- Parent(s): Harry Jackman; Mary Coyne Rowell
- Relatives: Hal Jackman (brother); Nancy Jackman (sister); Newton Rowell (grandfather)

Frederic (Eric) L.R. Jackman (born May 17, 1934) is a Canadian psychologist, businessman, and philanthropist.

== Education and career ==
Jackman was educated at Trinity College School, the University of British Columbia, and the University of Toronto, and earned a PhD in Human Development and Psychology from the University of Chicago. After 17 years in Chicago, he returned to Canada in 1979 to practice psychology. He is President of Invicta Investments ULC, and Chair of the Jackman Foundation.

In 2010, the Institute of Child Study at the University of Toronto was renamed the Dr. Eric Jackman Institute of Child Study following his donation.

He was Founding Chair of the Psychology Foundation of Canada and its flagship program Strong Minds, Strong Kids. In 1990, he founded the Canadian Journalism Foundation, which later established the Dr. Eric Jackman Award for Excellence in Journalism.

== Honours ==
- Member of the Order of Canada (May 26 2011)
- Order of Ontario (2003)
- Canadian Forces' Decoration
- C.M. Hincks National Award for Mental Health
- Canadian Psychological Association Distinguished Contributions to Psychology Award (2022)
- Golden Jubilee of Elizabeth II medal (2002)
- Diamond Jubilee of Elizabeth II medal (2012)
- 125th Anniversary of the Confederation of Canada Medal (1992)
- Honorary degrees from the University of Toronto (2013), York University (2010), University of Windsor (2005), and Assumption University (Windsor, Ontario) (2002)
- King Charles III Coronation Medal (June 20, 2025)
