= Distress hand signal =

Signal requesting help

A distress hand signal is a hand signal to indicate distress and need of rescue. In the maritime and aviation sector, hand signals are used to indicate the need for physical rescue, both to attract attention and to communicate in an environment where shouts for help could not be heard. The Women's Signal for Help is used to covertly signal the need for assistance against domestic violence or human trafficking. The signals are, in most cases, universal.

At sea, the oldest hand signal to indicate distress is to flap the arms up and down. Cloth or bright objects may be held to increase visibility.

== Maritime and aviation ==
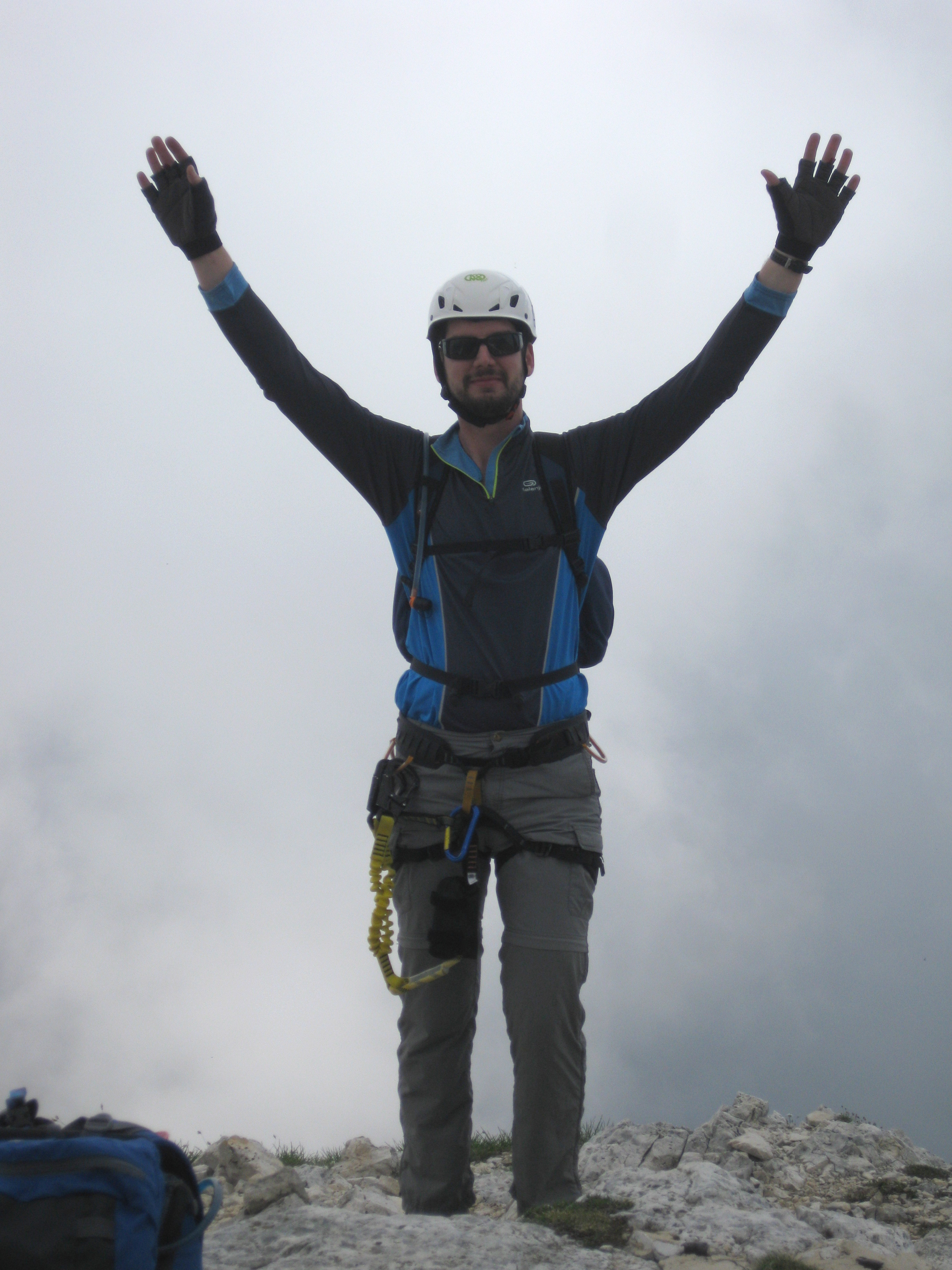
Hands raised in a Y shape to signal distress to a rescue helicopter

For shipwreck incidents, arm gestures can indicate the needs of an individual, from being noticed to being rescued. At sea, the oldest hand signal to indicate distress is to flap the arms up and down. Cloth or bright objects may be held to increase visibility.

Those working in the maritime and aviation sectors may have to deal with aggressive weather conditions, and sometimes technical difficulties may occur. In aviation, a downed pilot would hold their hands straight above their head to indicate that they want to be picked up. If they need help repairing their aircraft, they would hold their arms out straight to the side. One method of signalling an emergency to a rescue helicopter is to raise one's arms in a "Y" shape, indicating that "yes", rescue is needed. (Conversely, one arm raised and one lowered signifies an "N" for "no".) Those working in these sectors usually learn these hand signals as a part of their training.

== Women's Signal for Help ==
The Signal for Help designed and publicized by the Canadian Women's Foundation

During the COVID-19 pandemic, there were extensive lockdowns which kept people at home. As people then mainly communicated by social media, in 2020, the Canadian Women's Foundation (CWF) devised a hand signal called the Signal for Help which women could use to secretly indicate to another person that they were at risk of domestic violence or victims of human trafficking and so needed assistance. Being a silent hand gesture, other people around the victim would not be aware of it being made; promotion of the campaign highlighted its potential use on video calls during the COVID-19 lockdowns.

The CWF signal has the palm outward with the thumb across it. The fingers are then closed over the thumb to symbolize that one is being held or hurt.

Knowledge of this signal spread through social media such as TikTok. In 2021, a girl in Kentucky used the signal when she had been kidnapped, and people who saw it alerted the local police who rescued her. As a result, the Women's Signal for Help is an option that allows those who feel abused to discreetly ask for help without alerting the abuser or leaving a digital record of their request. The police can also identify this signal and take necessary steps.

== Mayday hand signal ==
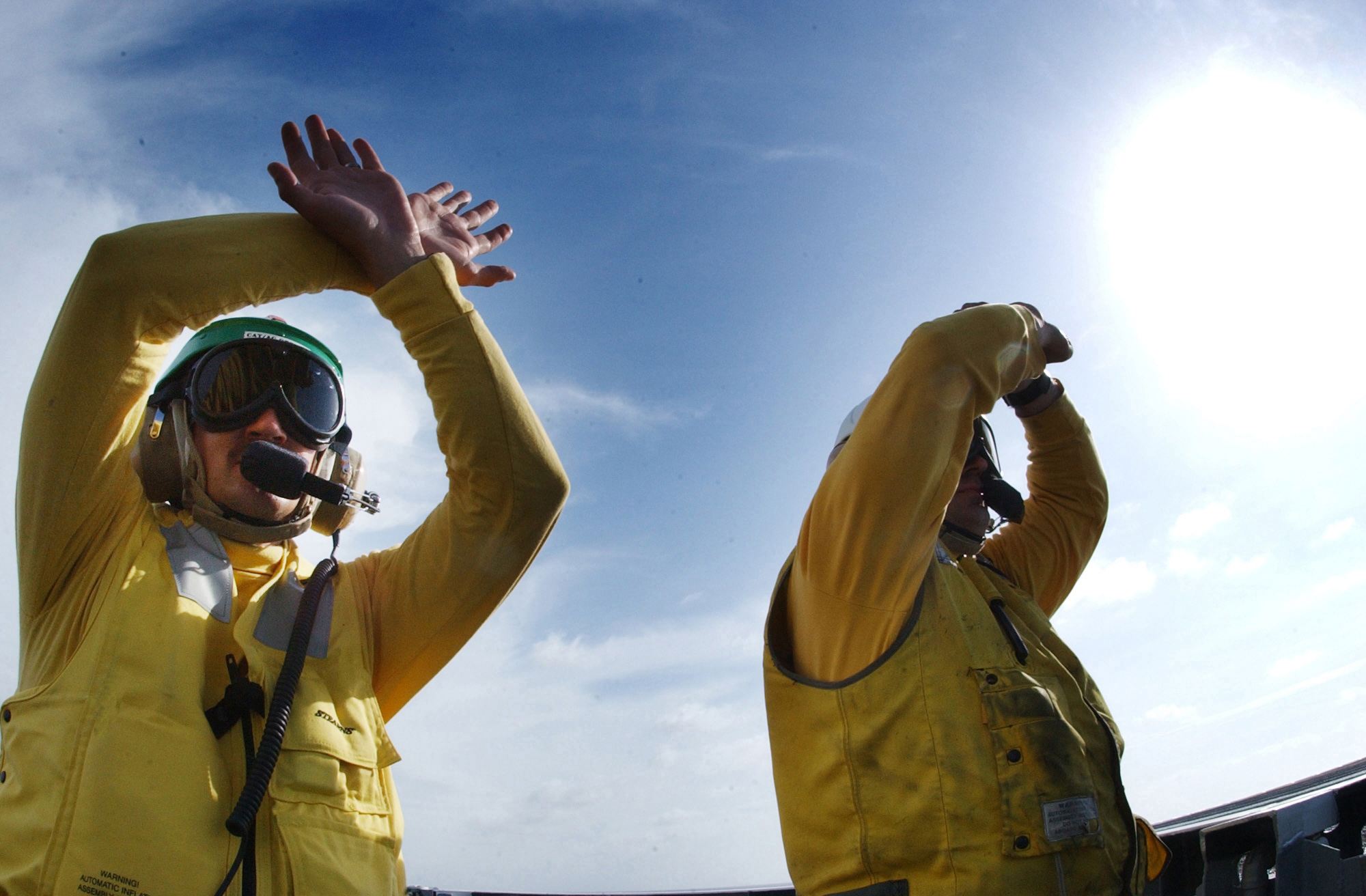
'STOP' mayday hand signal used by ramp crew

First used in 1923, the mayday hand signal is an important nonverbal communication method in the area of aviation, as the ground handlers of a ramp crew, when visual contact is impaired or they cannot contact the aircraft, can use it to convey a life-threatening emergency.

This signal is "X" shape, which involve two arms crossed and raised above the head, and this signifies to pilots or other coworkers or people around them that there might be a fire, fuel spill, aircraft malfunction. This signal ensures timely awareness of the situation, facilitates immediate emergency solutions, evacuation, or firefighting; this helps with the avoidance of accidents and the maintenance of the safety and security of the aircraft and people.

This hand signal is widely known through popular culture references.

== Diving ==
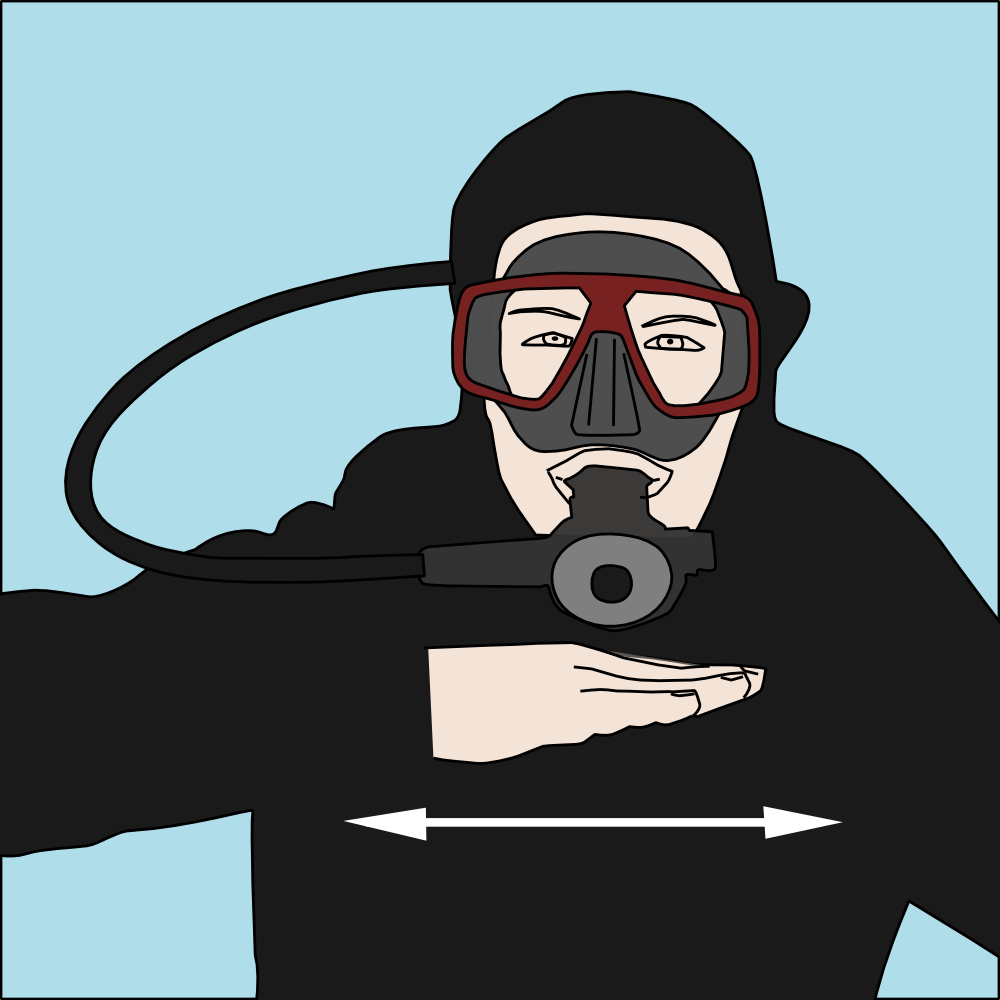
A diver may communicate that they are out of air by "cutting" or "chopping" their throat with a flat hand

Divers use various hand signals to communicate with each other underwater, with several gestures being used to indicate specific emergency situations.
