= Signal for Help =

Covert gesture to indicate domestic violence

The Signal for Help: 1. Palm to camera and tuck thumb; 2. Trap thumb

A video showing the Signal for Help

The Signal for Help (or the Violence at Home Signal for Help) is a single-handed gesture that can be used over a video call or in person by an individual to alert others that they feel threatened and need help. Originally, the signal was created as a tool to combat the rise in domestic violence cases around the world linked to self-isolation measures that were related to the COVID-19 pandemic.

The signal is performed by holding one hand up with the thumb tucked into the palm, then folding the four other fingers down, symbolically trapping the thumb by the rest of the fingers. It was designed intentionally as a single continuous hand movement, rather than a sign held in one position, so it could be made easily visible.

The Signal for Help was created by the Canadian Women's Foundation and introduced on April 14, 2020. It soon spread via the TikTok social video platform and was adopted by the international Women's Funding Network (WFN). It received widespread praise from Canadian and international news organizations for helping provide a modern solution to the issue of a rise in domestic violence cases.

Addressing concerns that abusers may become aware of such a widespread online initiative, the Canadian Women's Foundation and other organizations clarified that this signal is not "something that's going to save the day" but instead is a tool someone could use to get help.

The campaign intends the signal to mean "reach out to me safely", and advises that if someone sees a person using the signal on a video call, they should contact the signaler by another means (such as a text message or email) to ask them what they need. The campaign recommends that contacting emergency services should only be done if signaler explicitly requests this. Asking yes–no questions will reduce risk and make it easier for them to respond.

== See also ==
- Distress hand signal
