= Sarah Rowell Wright =

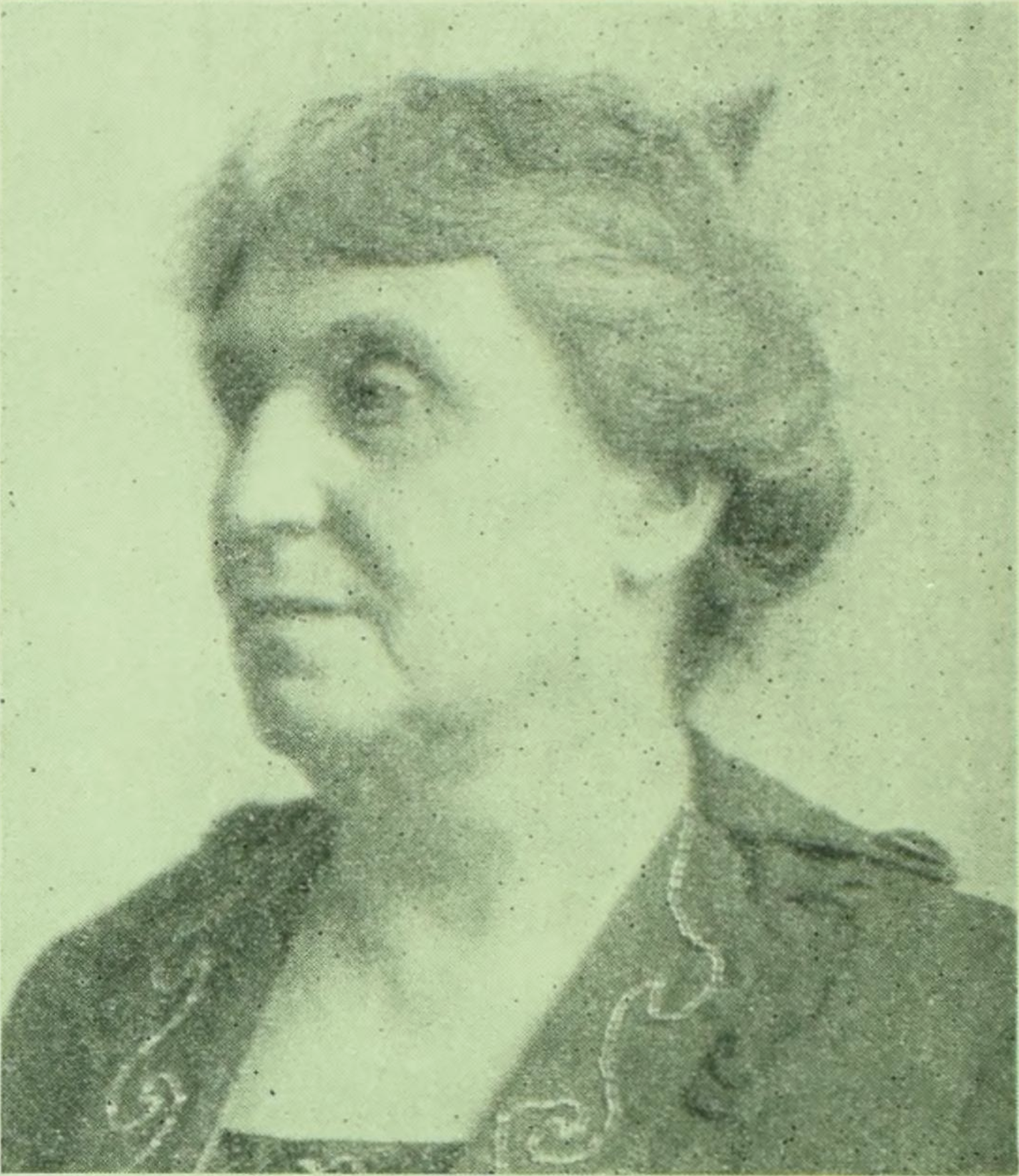
- Wright in a 1930 publication.
- Born: Sarah Alice Rowell; October 4, 1862; London, Ontario, Canada
- Died: June 26, 1930 (aged 67); London, Ontario
- Occupations: temperance reformer; suffragist; newspaper editor
- Known for: President, Dominion Woman's Christian Temperance Union; President, Woman's Missionary Society of the Methodist Church; Vice-president, National Suffrage Association; Vice-president of the Canadian Social Service Council
- Spouse: Benjamin Gordon Hobson Wright (m. 1884; died 1927)
- Children: 4
- Relatives: Newton Rowell (brother); Mary Coyne Rowell (niece)

Sarah Rowell Wright (1862–1930) was a Canadian temperance reformer, newspaper editor, and suffragist. She served as President of the Dominion Woman's Christian Temperance Union (WCTU), President of the Woman's Missionary Society of the Methodist Church (London Conference branch), vice-president, National Suffrage Association, and vice-president of the Canadian Social Service Council.

== Early life and education ==
Sarah Alice Rowell was born in London, Ontario, on October 4, 1862. Her parents were Joseph E. and Nancy (Green) Rowell.

She was educated in the local schools and at a ladies’ boarding school.

== Career ==
Uniting with the WCTU, Wright became active in the work and, after serving in various local positions, was elected recording secretary of the Ontario WCTU in 1899 and corresponding secretary in 1900. Later, she was elected vice-president of the Canadian WCTU and in 1905, she was made president, being successively re-elected to-that office until till her death. In the latter capacity, she led the fight for temperance reform in Canada, the Union having been influential in securing War-time Prohibition. Her brother, the Hon. Newton Rowell, then president of the Privy Council and acting president of the Dominion War Cabinet, also had a leading part in securing War Prohibition.

Wright was editor of the Canadian White Ribbon Tidings, official organ of the Dominion WCTU. She also wrote a series of leaflets on the detrimental effects of tobacco consumption, as well as other subjects relative to the work of the WCTU.

"HOW WILL WOMEN FEEL? Unless our Government can validate 'at the front'—and we are assured this, as Premier, would be your desire—but unless our Government can validate its tacit pledge of immunity from drink can it be expected that Canadian mothers and wives will consent to the enlistment of their sons and husbands even in defence of the Empire's honor and life, when their own highest interests will be jeopardized by an enemy greater than war."
Yours respectfully, Sarah Rowell Wright. President Dominion W.C.T.U.

During World War I, she was an officer of the Ontario Red Cross.

She was a very active leader in the fight for woman suffrage, and served for many years as vice-president of the National Suffrage Association. She was also vice-president of the Canadian Social Service Council, and a member of the Woman's Canadian Club. She was a member of the Advisory Administrative Committee of the World's WCTU, and in 1929, visited Bermuda in the interest of that body, organizing one Union and three young people's societies.

== Personal life ==
She married Benjamin Gordon Hobson Wright (died London, Ontario, June 23, 1927), of Columbus, Ohio, in 1884. He was the founder of the Associated Kin of the Canadian Expeditionary Force.

They had four sons: Edward, Douglas, Newton, John.

== Death and legacy ==
Sarah Rowell Wright died in London, Ontario, June 26, 1930.

The "Sarah Rowell Wright" WCTU in Albert County, New Brunswick, was named in her honor.

== Selected works ==
=== As Sarah Rowell Wright ===
- "What the world owes to Susannah Wesley", Methodist Magazine and Review (1903)

=== As Sara Rowell Wright ===
- "World Progress and The Drink Question", The Standard (1930)
