= James MacCallum =

Canadian ophthalmologist (1860 - 1943)

James M. MacCallum
- Born: James Metcalfe MacCallum; 1860; Richmond Hill, Ontario
- Died: 1943 (aged 82–83); Toronto, Ontario
- Alma mater: University of Toronto

James Metcalfe MacCallum (1860–1943) was a Canadian ophthalmologist and one of the most important patrons of Tom Thomson and the Group of Seven.

== Biography ==
He was born in Richmond Hill, north of Toronto, but due to his father, a Methodist minister, being sent to the area, spent part of his early life on the rural shores of Georgian Bay and Muskoka. He studied medicine at the University of Toronto and later earned his doctorate in medicine at the same university. After further training in London and Berlin, he became a professor of ophthalmology at the University of Toronto in 1903. He was affiliated with the Toronto General Hospital and Hospital for Sick Children. He was also an influential member of the Medical Council of Canada and the College of Physicians and Surgeons of Ontario.

In 1911, he built a cottage on an island in Go Home Bay in Georgian Bay, naming it "West Wind Island". That same year Lawren Harris was staying nearby with Dr. David E. Stanton Wishart, also a professor of medicine at the University of Toronto. He would soon meet many of Harris' artist friends, purchasing works from them and inviting them to this cottage to paint. Several took him up on the offer and completed major work at Go Home Bay. This included Tom Thomson, J.E.H. Macdonald, Arthur Lismer, and A.Y. Jackson.

When Jackson for want of funds spoke of leaving Canada for greater opportunity, MacCallum offered to pay his expenses for a year so he could stay in Canada and paint. Thomson, always short of money, was also funded for a year by MacCallum. He also used his funds to pay for a quarter of the construction costs of the Studio Building as a permanent workspace for artists in Toronto. When Tom Thomson died, it was MacCallum who paid for the memorial cairn in Algonquin Park.

MacCallum became close friends with Thomson and the Group of Seven artists. While not painting himself he was a frequent presence at the Studio Building and accompanied members on expeditions north, such as a trip in 1916 with Lawren Harris and his cousin Chester, to fish with Tom Thomson and several important trips made painting the Algoma region with Harris.

MacCallum died in 1943 leaving his large art collection to the National Gallery of Canada. He wished that his cottage would become a permanent setting for painters to stay, but difficulties arose and it passed to his estate from which it was purchased by H. R. Jackman and his wife, Mary.

The Dr. James M. MacCallum Papers are in Library and Archives, National Gallery of Canada.
