= Mary Coyne Rowell =

Mary Coyne Rowell Jackman
- Born: January 7, 1904
- Died: July 11, 1994 (aged 90)
- Education: Victoria University, Toronto (BA)
- Spouse: Harry Jackman
- Relatives: Hal Jackman (son); Nancy Jackman (daughter); Newton Rowell (father)

Mary Coyne Rowell Jackman (7 Jan 1904 – 11 Jul 1994) was a Canadian social activist and philanthropist. She was the daughter of Nellie Langford and Newton Rowell, a politician and Chief Justice of Ontario.

Mary graduated from Victoria College in the University of Toronto with a B.A. in 1925 in language and ethics before studying at the London School of Economics. She later married Harry Jackman, with whom she had Hal, Eric, Edward, and Nancy. Mary volunteered and made contributions to the YWCA, the Women's Legal Education and Action Fund, and the Canadian Women's Foundation.

She obtained an interest in Virginia Woolf and amassed a large collection of first edition copies of Woolf and the wider Bloomsbury Group. This collection was later donated to Victoria College, where it is housed in the special collections as one of the largest of its kind in the world. Mary also collected early Canadian landscape paintings, including those by members of the Group of Seven. She and Harry purchased a cottage on Georgian Bay previously owned by art patron James MacCallum. The cottage uniquely included mural paintings by members of the Group of Seven, which were later donated by the Jackman family to the National Gallery of Canada.
