= Canadian Journalism Foundation =

Canadian non-profit organization

- Abbreviation: CJF
- Formation: 1990
- Founder: F.L.R. (Eric) Jackman
- Headquarters: Toronto
- Services: Media literacy campaign, fellowship program, speakers series
- Fields: Journalism
- Official language: English, French
- Chair of the board: Kathy English
- President and Executive Director: Natalie Turvey
- Staff: 3 (2019)
- Website: cjf-fjc.ca

Founded in 1990, The Canadian Journalism Foundation (CJF) is a non-profit organization that promotes Canadian journalism by celebrating journalistic achievement through an annual awards program; by operating journalism websites, J-Source.ca (English) and ProjetJ.ca (French), in cooperation with the country's journalism schools; by organizing events that facilitate dialogue among journalists, business people, government officials, academics and students about the role of the media in Canadian society; and by fostering opportunities for journalism education, training and research.

The Excellence in Journalism Award is presented to a journalistic organization for exceptional performance. The Lifetime Achievement Award recognizes an individual who has made an outstanding lifetime contribution to journalism in Canada.

The Foundation's public programs, in the form of panel discussions and other events, are targeted at journalists, media executives, as well as academic and business leaders to help illuminate current issues or concerns.

The Canadian Journalism Foundation also manages the Canadian Journalism Project and its website, J-Source, in collaboration with leading journalism schools and organizations.

In 2018, the CJF started celebrating World News Day, encouraging news outlets around the world to communicate to the public the role of professional journalism plays in democracies. WND is held annually in May in many countries, although several Asian news outlets choose to celebrate it on September 28, which correspond with UNESCO’s International Day for Universal Access to Information.

During the 2019 Canadian federal election, the Foundation launched a news literary campaign called NewsWise. Using humour and Canadian media personalities, the initiative offers the public tools to check the accuracy of the information they come across while using the internet and social media. The campaign is funded by a contribution from Google of Can$1 million.
