= Nancy Ruth =

Canadian politician

The Honourable Nancy Ruth CM

Canadian Senator from Ontario
- In office March 24, 2005 – January 6, 2017
- Nominated by: Paul Martin
- Appointed by: Adrienne Clarkson

Personal details
- Born: Nancy Ruth Rowell Jackman; January 6, 1942 (age 84) Toronto, Ontario, Canada
- Party: Conservative
- Other political affiliations: Progressive Conservative (until 2006)
- Parent(s): Harry Jackman; Mary Coyne Rowell
- Relatives: Hal Jackman (brother); Eric Jackman (brother); Newton Rowell (grandfather)

Nancy Ruth CM (born Nancy Ruth Rowell Jackman, January 6, 1942) is a Canadian heiress, activist, philanthropist and former Canadian senator. Prime Minister Paul Martin appointed her to the Senate on March 24, 2005. While initially appointed as a Progressive Conservative, she joined the Conservative caucus on March 28, 2006. She was Canada's first openly lesbian senator. She retired from the Senate on January 6, 2017, upon reaching the mandatory retirement age 75.

== Life and career ==
Nancy Ruth was born in Toronto, Ontario, and is an alumna of Branksome Hall. She was born Nancy Ruth Rowell Jackman and is the sister of former Lieutenant Governor of Ontario Hal Jackman, the daughter of former Member of Parliament Harry Jackman and the granddaughter of former MP and Ontario Liberal Party leader Newton Rowell. She changed her name in the mid-1990s; she does not use "Ruth" as a last name, instead using both her names as given names with no last name, and therefore preferred to be known as "Senator Nancy Ruth" instead of "Senator Ruth." She was alphabetized under "N," not "R," on the Senate website.

A Red Tory, she stood as a candidate for the Progressive Conservative Party of Ontario on two occasions in the early 1990s, when she was known as Nancy Jackman. The first was in the 1990 provincial election, when she lost to New Democratic Party candidate Zanana Akande by fewer than 1,000 votes in the riding of St. Andrew—St. Patrick. On April 1, 1993, she lost to Liberal Tim Murphy by over 2,000 votes in a by-election held in St. George—St. David. In 1997, she received the Governor General's Award in Commemoration of the Persons Case.

Before being appointed to the Senate, she was a social activist and philanthropist. She founded several women's organizations in Canada, including the Canadian Women's Foundation and a women's studies chair at Mount Saint Vincent University. She has also been a noted benefactor of hospitals and art galleries throughout Canada, and she was named a member of the Order of Canada in 1994.

She has long battled for women's constitutional rights and thus opposed the Charlottetown Accord in 1992. She is also a vocal opponent of pornography. Her support for tougher child pornography laws made her a controversial figure amongst other gay rights activists, who saw the legislation as dangerously ambiguous in its definitions and broad in scope.

Nancy Ruth crossed party lines to endorse Kathleen Wynne in her bid to win the leadership of the Ontario Liberal Party in 2013; she donated $10,000 to the Liberal MPP's campaign.

== Controversies ==
=== Rewording the Canadian national anthem ===
In 2010, Nancy Ruth took credit for the Throne Speech, including a proposal to study changing the line of "O Canada" from "all thy sons command" to "thou dost in us command", the original wording. Intense public backlash caused the Prime Minister's Office to announce that the issue had been dismissed.

=== Comments to women's equality rights groups ===
Nancy Ruth sparked controversy on May 3, 2010, with comments she made during a meeting with women's equality rights groups on Parliament Hill. The groups were among many who had leveled criticisms at the Conservative government for maintaining their refusal to include funding for abortions in their maternal health plan for the G8, even after finally agreeing to include family planning measures such as contraception. Nancy Ruth fired back at the groups, telling them, "We've got five weeks or whatever left until the G8 starts. Shut the fuck up on this issue," she said. "If you push it, there'll be more backlash. This is now a political football. This is not about women's health in this country". Nancy Ruth also said, "Canada is still a country with free and accessible abortion. Leave it there. Don't make this an election issue."

The next day, the Conservative government cut funding to 11 women's groups, some of which support abortion as part of the G8 maternal health initiative.

=== Response to auditors' questions ===
Nancy Ruth drew media attention again in 2015 when responding to reporters regarding the auditor general's questioning why she claimed separate breakfasts as public expenses when she could have eaten the airline breakfasts included in the price of her airline ticket, which she had also expensed. She says, "Well, those breakfasts are pretty awful," and "If you want ice-cold camembert with broken crackers, have it!" The comments drew criticism as evidence of senators feeling entitled to a certain lifestyle at public expense.

== See also ==
- List of Ontario senators
