= Harry Gladstone Clarke =

Canadian politician (1881–1956)

Harry G. Clarke

Member of Parliament for Rosedale
- In office October 1935 – March 1940

Personal details
- Born: 1 June 1881 Toronto, Ontario, Canada
- Died: 8 April 1956 (aged 74) Gettysburg, Pennsylvania, U.S.
- Party: Conservative
- Spouse(s): Ethel Millen m. 17 Jun 1908
- Profession: insurance agent

Harry Gladstone Clarke (1 June 1881 – 8 April 1956) was a Canadian parliamentarian and insurance agent.

Clarke was an alderman on Toronto City Council for Ward 2, when he was elected to the House of Commons of Canada in the 1935 federal election as the Conservative Member of Parliament for Rosedale. He was defeated in the summer of 1939 in his attempt to win the nomination as a National Conservative candidate in the 1940 federal election by Harry Jackman. After he and his supporters unsuccessfully tried to obtain an "open convention" in Rosedale in early 1940 to re-contest the nomination, he retired from politics.

He died en route to Florida at Pennsylvania in 1956. He was interred at Mount Pleasant Cemetery.
