= Courtney Whitney =

American general

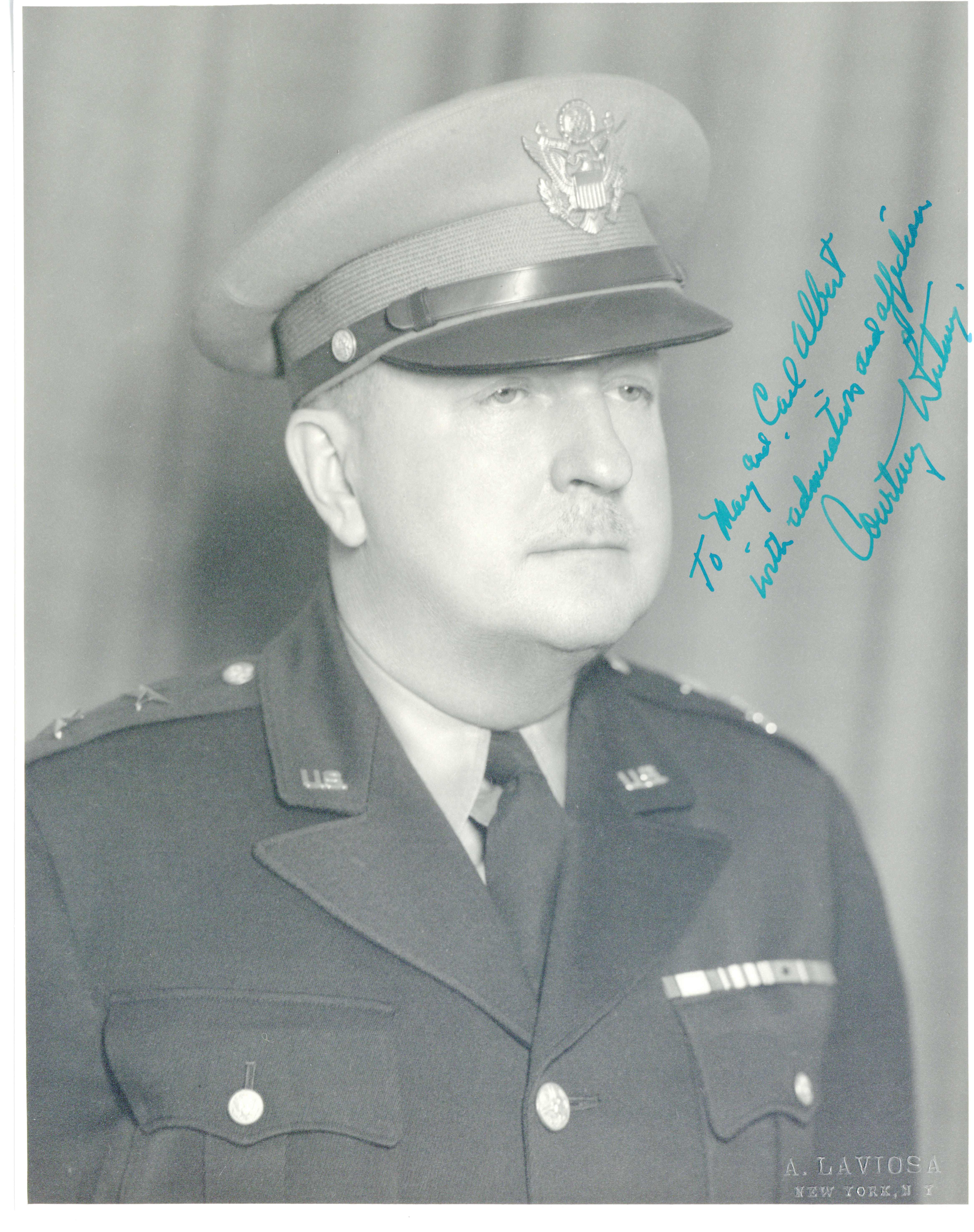
- Born: 20 May 1897; Washington, D.C., United States
- Died: 21 March 1969 (aged 71)
- Burial place: Arlington National Cemetery, Virginia, United States
- Military career
- Allegiance: United States
- Branch: United States Army
- Service years: 1917–1951
- Rank: Major General
- Conflicts: World War I World War II; Korean War
- Awards: Army Distinguished Service Medal; Silver Star; Legion of Merit (2)
- Other work: Lawyer

Major General Courtney Whitney (May 20, 1897 – March 21, 1969) was a lawyer and United States Army commander during World War II who later served as a senior official during the American occupation of Japan (1945–1951). He played a major role in the liberalization of Japanese government, society, and economy during the occupation.

== Early life ==
Born in Washington, D.C., Whitney enlisted in the United States Army in 1917 and became a pursuit pilot. He received his law degree from George Washington University in 1927 and left the army to open a private practice in Manila.

== World War II ==
In 1940, Whitney returned to active duty. He worked in intelligence in Washington, DC, serving as the intelligence officer to the 14th Air Force in China until 1943, when General Douglas MacArthur requested for him to be assigned to the Southwest Pacific Theater. Initially stationed at MacArthur's headquarters in Australia, Whitney helped to organize anti-Japanese resistance in the Philippines. Described by author William Manchester as an "ultraconservative Manila corporation lawyer", Whitney held highly racist views towards Filipinos, except for those of Spanish blood, whom he believed were the only ones fit for governing the Philippines.

Whitney was present at the Battle of Leyte in 1944 and landed in the Philippines with MacArthur, after which he was assigned chief of the Philippine section of the Allied Intelligence Bureau. After the restoration of the Commonwealth of the Philippines by Allied forces, Whitney was assigned responsibility for Philippine civil affairs.

== Occupation of Japan ==
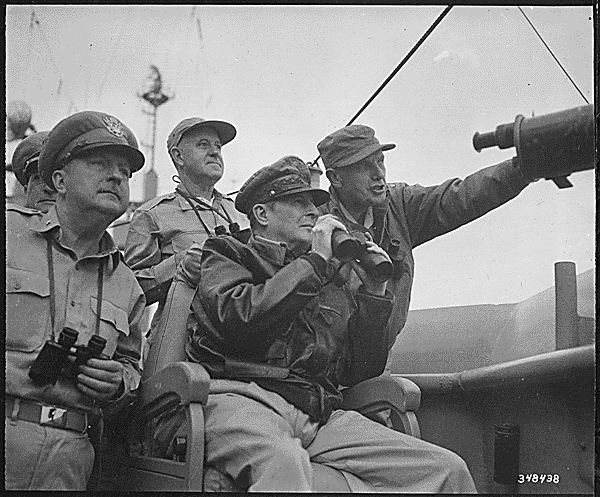
Brigadier General Courtney Whitney (left); General Douglas MacArthur (middle), Commander in Chief of U.N. Forces; and Major General Edward Almond (right), observe the shelling of Inchon from the U.S.S. Mt. McKinley, September 15, 1950.

After Japan surrendered, Whitney accompanied MacArthur to Atsugi Air Base and became Chief of the Government Section at GHQ. With Lt. Col. Milo Rowell, he drafted the 1947 Constitution of Japan and sent it to the Diet for approval. Historians emphasize the similarity of occupation policies to the US New Deal programs of the 1930s. Moore and Robinson note that "New Deal liberalism seemed natural, even to conservative Republicans such as MacArthur and Whitney."

Whitney remained close to MacArthur throughout the occupation and served as Chief of Government Section at his headquarters. He accompanied MacArthur during the Korean War and received the Silver Star and a second Legion of Merit for his brief visits to the front. Whitney resigned from the army after MacArthur was removed from command in 1951. He was decorated with the Army Distinguished Service Medal at his retirement ceremony. In 1956, Whitney's biography of his commander, MacArthur: His Rendezvous With History, was published.

== Decorations ==

USAF Command Pilot wings
1st Row	Army Distinguished Service Medal		Silver Star	
2nd Row	Legion of Merit with Oak Leaf Cluster	Air Medal	World War I Victory Medal	American Defense Service Medal
3rd Row	American Campaign Medal	Asiatic-Pacific Campaign Medal with one silver and two bronze service stars	World War II Victory Medal	Army of Occupation Medal
4th Row	Korean Service Medal with two service stars	National Defense Service Medal	United Nations Korea Medal	Philippine Liberation Medal with two stars

== Legacy ==
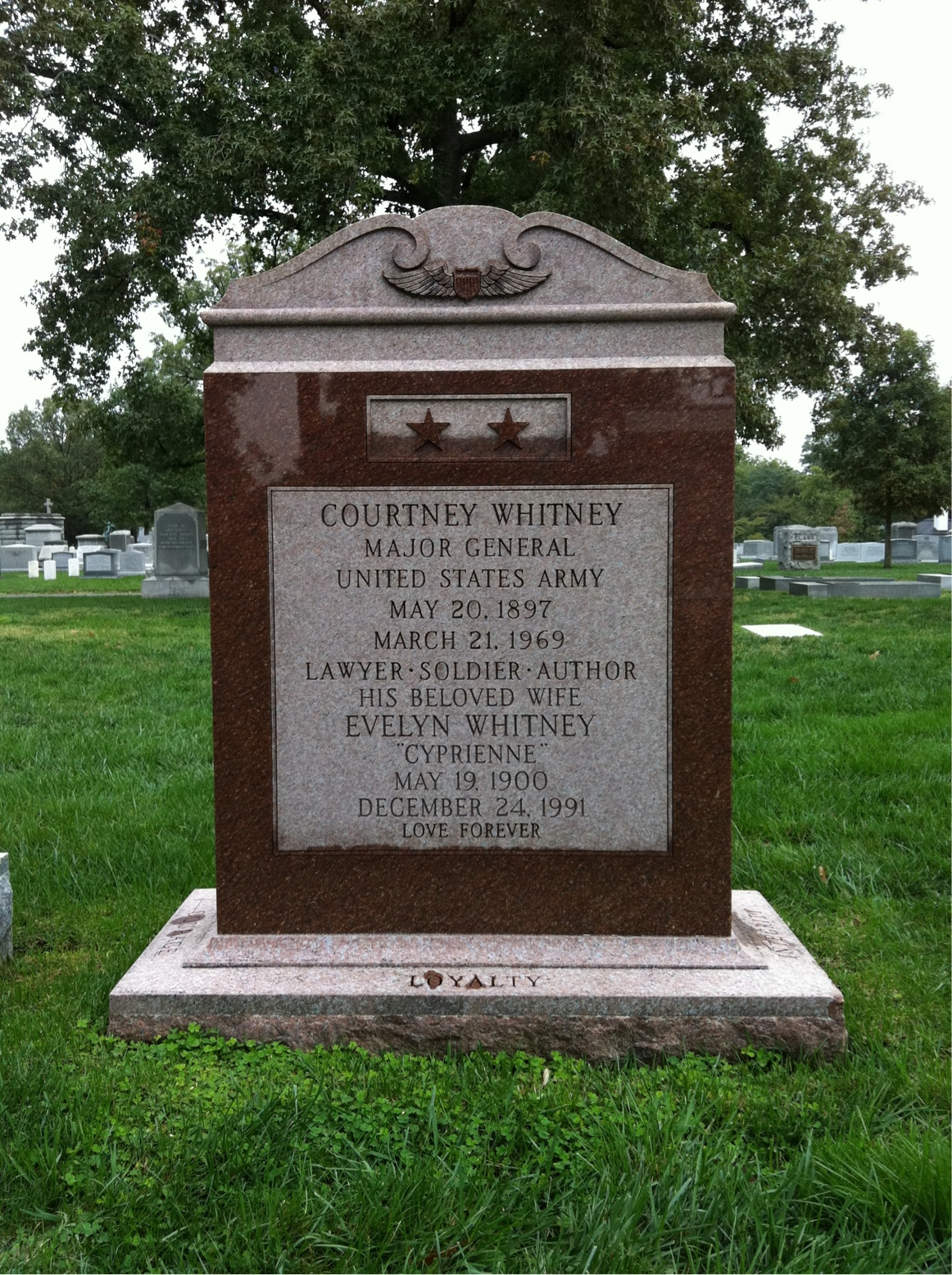
The grave of Major General Courtney Whitney at Arlington National Cemetery.

Whitney is buried at Arlington National Cemetery. He is also represented at the MacArthur Landing Memorial National Park in Leyte, in the Philippines as one of the statues of MacArthur and his party wading ashore at Leyte. Whitney's statue is behind the statues of Sergio Osmeña and Carlos P. Romulo.

== In popular culture ==
Whitney was played by Dick O'Neill in the 1977 film MacArthur

Whitney appears frequently as one of MacArthur's key advisors in James Webb's historical novel "The Emperor's General."

== Bibliography ==
- James, D. Clayton. The Years of MacArthur 1941-45 (Boston: Houghton Mifflin, 1975), vol 2
- James, D. Clayton. The years of MacArthur: Triumph and disaster, 1945-1964 (Boston: Houghton Mifflin, 1985), vol 3
- Manchester, W. 1978. American Caesar: Douglas MacArthur 1880-1964. Little, Brown and Company, Boston. ISBN 0-316-54498-1
- Whitney, Courtney. MacArthur: His Rendezvous with Destiny (New York: Alfred E. Knopf 1956)
- Williams, Justin. "Completing Japan's Political Reorientation, 1947-1952: Crucial Phase of the Allied Occupation." American Historical Review (1968): 1454-1469. in JSTOR
