= Newton Rowell =

Canadian lawyer, politician and judge (1867–1941)

The Honourable Newton Rowell PC KC
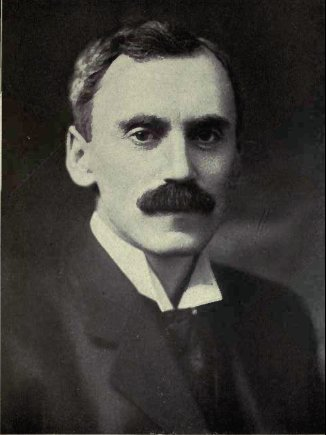

Chief Justice of Ontario
- In office 1936–1938
- Preceded by: Sir William Mulock
- Succeeded by: Robert Spelman Robertson

Member of the Canadian Parliament for Durham
- In office 1917–1920
- Preceded by: Charles Jonas Thornton
- Succeeded by: Fred Wellington Bowen

Ontario MPP
- In office 1911–1918
- Preceded by: Andrew MacKay
- Succeeded by: John Alexander Calder
- Constituency: Oxford North

Minister of Health (Canada)
- In office 1919–1920
- Preceded by: None - new position
- Succeeded by: James Alexander Calder

President of the Canadian Bar Association
- In office 1932–1934
- Preceded by: Louis St. Laurent
- Succeeded by: Isaac Pitblado

President of the Ontario Bar Association
- In office 1927–1930
- Preceded by: Wallace Nesbitt, K.C.
- Succeeded by: Dalton Lally McCarthy, K.C.

Personal details
- Born: Newton Wesley Rowell; November 1, 1867 London Township, Ontario
- Died: November 22, 1941 (aged 74) Toronto, Ontario
- Resting place: Mt. Pleasant Cemetery, Toronto
- Party: Ontario Liberal Party; Unionist Party (federal)
- Spouse: Nellie Langford
- Children: 4
- Relatives: Sarah Rowell Wright (sister)
- Profession: Lawyer, judge

Newton Wesley Rowell, PC KC (November 1, 1867 – November 22, 1941) was a Canadian lawyer, politician, judge, and lay leader in the Methodist Church. Rowell led the Ontario Liberal Party from 1911 to 1917 and put forward a platform advocating temperance. Rowell's Liberals failed to oppose the Whitney government's passage of Regulation 17 which restricted the teaching of the French language in schools and alienated the province's French-Canadian minority.

== Life and career ==
Rowell was born in London Township, Ontario. He ran for the House of Commons of Canada in the 1900 federal election but was defeated in York East. Returning to his law practice, Rowell was made King's Counsel in 1902. He became senior partner in his law firm (Rowell, Reid, and Wood) and had a prominent legal career.

He returned to politics in 1911. Though not a candidate, he was a prominent campaigner supporting the government of Sir Wilfrid Laurier during the 1911 federal election. Rowell spoke across Ontario to promote both Laurier's plan for a Canadian Navy and the trade reciprocity agreement that had been negotiated between the federal government and the United States against the opposition of prominent Liberal business leaders, who feared that free trade would be extended to manufacturing.

Later that year, Rowell was chosen to lead the Ontario Liberal Party, despite not having a seat in the legislature, after the incumbent leader, Alexander Grant MacKay, was forced to resign shortly before the beginning of that year's election campaign. He was elected to the legislature in the 1911 provincial election (representing Oxford North) and became Leader of the Opposition.

In 1917, Rowell, a supporter of conscription during World War I, left the Ontario legislature and broke with Sir Wilfrid Laurier and the Liberal Party of Canada to join the national Unionist government of Sir Robert Borden as a result of the Conscription Crisis of 1917. He was appointed to Borden's government as President of the Privy Council of Canada in October 1917 and was also made vice-chairman of the government's War Committee, which gave him primary responsibility for organizing the war effort and enforcing conscription. He went on to win a seat in the House of Commons as the Unionist MP for Durham in the December 1917 federal election.

Rowell attended meetings of the Imperial War Cabinet in London, England, along with other senior Canadian ministers. In 1919, he was given added responsibilities as Canada's first Minister of Health. Rowell declined to join the government of Borden's successor, Arthur Meighen, in 1920, and he did not run for re-election to parliament in 1921.

After the war, Rowell served as a Canadian delegate to the League of Nations and became involved in international affairs. He also helped lead the Methodists into a merger with Presbyterians to form the United Church of Canada.

As a lawyer, Rowell had one of the strongest litigation practices in Toronto, arguing many cases before the Supreme Court of Canada and the Judicial Committee of the Privy Council, including Edwards v. Canada (Attorney General), better known as the Persons Case. In 1903, he had founded the firm that is now known as McMillan LLP. In 1929, he argued and won the Persons Case, concerning whether women were eligible for appointment to the Canadian Senate. The Supreme Court of Canada said that they were not, but Rowell successfully appealed the case to the Privy Council in London in a landmark decision for female equality in Canada.

Rowell served as president of the Ontario Bar Association from 1927 to 1930 and as national president of the Canadian Bar Association from 1932 to 1934. In 1936, he was appointed Chief Justice of Ontario.

He is also noted for being the first chair of the 1937 Rowell–Sirois Commission into Dominion-Provincial economic relations and for being a founding leader of the United Church of Canada. Asked how to say his name, he told The Literary Digest it had ow as in now – row-ELL.

His daughter Mary Coyne Rowell wed Harry Jackman in 1930. As a result, Rowell was the maternal grandfather of former Lieutenant Governor of Ontario Hal Jackman and former Senator Nancy Ruth.

== Archives ==
There is a Newton Wesley Rowell fonds at Library and Archives Canada.

== Electoral record ==
1917 Canadian federal election: Durham
Party	Candidate	Votes	%	±%}
Government (Unionist)	Newton Rowell	5,923	80.84	+24.66
Opposition (Laurier Liberals)	George William Jones	1,404	19.16	-24.66

1900 Canadian federal election: York East
Party	Candidate	Votes
Independent Conservative	William Findlay Maclean	4,131
Liberal	N.W. Rowell	3,489

Party political offices
Preceded by Alexander Grant MacKay	Leader of the Ontario Liberal Party; 1911–1917	Succeeded by William Proudfoot
