= Hal Jackman =

Canadian businessman (born 1932)

The Honourable Hal Jackman OC OOnt CD

30th Chancellor of the University of Toronto
- In office 1997 – 2003
- President: Robert Prichard; Robert J. Birgeneau
- Preceded by: Rose Wolfe
- Succeeded by: Vivienne Poy

25th Lieutenant Governor of Ontario
- In office December 11, 1991 – January 24, 1997
- Monarch: Elizabeth II
- Governors General: Ray Hnatyshyn; Roméo LeBlanc
- Premier: Bob Rae; Mike Harris
- Preceded by: Lincoln Alexander
- Succeeded by: Hilary Weston

Personal details
- Born: Henry Newton Rowell Jackman; June 10, 1932 (age 94) Toronto, Ontario, Canada
- Spouse: Maruja Trinidad Duncan
- Parent(s): Harry Jackman; Mary Coyne Rowell
- Relatives: Nancy Ruth (sister); Newton Rowell (grandfather); Eric Jackman (brother)
- Occupation: Businessman

Henry Newton Rowell "Hal" Jackman OC OOnt CD (born June 10, 1932) is a Canadian billionaire businessman who served as the 25th Lieutenant Governor of Ontario from 1991 to 1997. He is the son of former Member of Parliament Harry Jackman and philanthropist Mary Rowell Jackman. His mother was the daughter of another former Member of Parliament, Newton Rowell. His sister, Nancy Ruth, is a philanthropist who was appointed to the Senate in 2005.

== Life and career ==
Jackman was educated at Pickering College, the University of Toronto Schools, Upper Canada College (where he was a member of Jackson's House), the University of Toronto Faculty of Law (now named in his honour), and the London School of Economics. He was also a member of Phi Gamma Delta Delta fraternity, Tau Kappa Chapter, during his time at the University of Toronto.

He was the chairman of the board of National Trust Company and The Empire Life Insurance Company, businesses primarily owned and controlled by his family. In 1964, he married Maruja Trinidad Duncan.

Jackman was the Progressive Conservative candidate in the Toronto riding of Rosedale, which had been previously held by his father, in the 1963, 1965 and 1974 Canadian federal elections. He lost on all three occasions to Liberal Donald Stovel Macdonald.

Jackman was a longtime fundraiser for the Progressive Conservatives, and he became a supporter of the Canadian Alliance when it was formed prior to the 2000 election. He was also an advocate of the Unite the Right movement, which resulted in the creation of the Conservative Party of Canada.

== Viceregal appointment ==
Jackman was appointed as Lieutenant Governor of Ontario by Governor General Ray Hnatyshyn in 1991, on the advice of Prime Minister Brian Mulroney, and he became a Member of the Order of Canada the same year. He focused on support for the arts, history and national unity during his time in office.

He served as Lieutenant Governor until 1997 and was then appointed to the Order of Ontario in 1998. He was promoted to Officer in the Order of Canada in the year 2000.

== Other distinctions ==
Jackman did not serve in the military, but he received the Canadian Forces' Decoration in recognition of his time as an honorary colonel of the Governor General's Horse Guards, a Toronto militia unit.

He was named chancellor of the University of Toronto in 1997. Following his retirement from that post, he was elected as the fourth Visitor of Massey College.

In September 2025, the University of Toronto's Faculty of Law was renamed Henry N.R. Jackman Faculty of law following his donation of $80 million.

== Coat of arms ==
Coat of arms of Hal Jackman
Crest A griffin segreant Gules holding in the dexter claw a representation of the mace of the House of Commons of Canada and in the sinister claw a morning star battle mace Or Escutcheon Per chevron Gules and Or in chief a sun between two spur-rowels also Or in base issuant from barry wavy Argent and Azure a mount Vert thereon an oak tree proper fructed Or Motto Optima Conserva (Latin for 'Preserve the best things')

Government offices
Preceded by Lincoln Alexander	Lieutenant Governor of Ontario; 1991–1997	Succeeded by Hilary Weston
Academic offices
Preceded by Rose Wolfe	Chancellor of the University of Toronto; 1997–2003	Succeeded by Vivienne Poy
