= Rowell's syndrome =

Autoimmune medical condition

Rowell's syndrome was described by Professor Neville Rowell and colleagues in 1963. Patients with the syndrome have lupus erythematosus (discoid or systemic), annular lesions of the skin like erythema multiforme associated with a characteristic pattern of immunological abnormalities. It is uncommon but occurs worldwide.

Rowell's syndrome has been reported to occur with all subtypes of LE (systemic, acute, subacute or discoid).

== See also ==
- Childhood discoid lupus erythematosus
- List of cutaneous conditions

== Bibliography ==
- Rowell NR, Beck JS, Anderson JR (August 1963). "Lupus Erythematosus and Erythema Multiforme-like Lesions: A Syndrome With Characteristic Immunological Abnormalities". Archives of Dermatology. 88: 176–80. doi:10.1001/archderm.1963.01590200064012. PMID 14043605.
- Aydogan K, Karadogan S, Balaban Adim S, Tunali S (September 2005). "Lupus erythematosus associated with erythema multiforme: report of two cases and review of the literature". Journal of the European Academy of Dermatology and Venereology. 19 (5): 621–7. doi:10.1111/j.1468-3083.2005.01233.x. PMID 16164723. S2CID 36525683.
- Duarte AF, Mota A, Pereira M, Baudrier T, Azevedo F (2008). "Rowell syndrome - case report and review of the literature". Dermatology Online Journal. 14 (3): 15. doi:10.5070/D32SV231H1. PMID 18627716.
- Lee A, Batra P, Furer V, Cheung W, Wang N, Franks A (2009). "Rowell syndrome (systemic lupus erythematosus + erythema multiforme)". Dermatology Online Journal. 15 (8): 1. doi:10.5070/D35PF8K3R2. PMID 19891909.
