= Empire Life =

Canadian company

The Empire Life Insurance Company
- Type: Subsidiary
- Industry: Insurance
- Founded: Toronto, Ontario, Canada, 1923
- Headquarters: 259 King Street East; Kingston, Ontario; K7L 3A8
- Key people: Mark Sylvia (president and CEO); Duncan N.R. Jackman (chairman of the board of directors)
- Products: Insurance, Investment
- Number of employees: 900
- Parent: E-L Financial Corporation (TSX: ELF)
- Subsidiaries: Empire Life Investments Inc.
- Website: www.empire.ca

The head office was built in 1853 for the Commercial Bank of the Midland District and was designed by William Hay. The 1931 additional was designed by Colin Drever.

The Empire Life Insurance Company, operating as Empire Life (French: Empire Vie), is a Canadian life insurance and financial services company headquartered in Kingston, Ontario. It was incorporated in 1923 and is a subsidiary of E-L Financial Corporation Limited of Toronto, Ontario, Canada. The company provides individual life, health and investment products as well as group life and health products through independent distribution partners including financial advisors, management general agents, national account firms and employee benefit producers. Empire Life is the parent company of Empire Life Investments Inc., a Canadian investment management company launched in 2011.

Empire Life has grown to become one of the top 10 life insurance companies in Canada and one of Canada's best employers.

== History and ownership ==
Empire Life was founded in 1923 by Milton Palmer Langstaff.

In 1929, Empire Life merged with The Commonwealth Life and Accident Insurance Company. This merger was followed by the acquisition of The Canadian Order of Odd Fellows insurance portfolio in 1934, and a subsequent merger with the Mutual Relief Life Insurance Company in 1936. Following the acquisition of the Mutual Relief Life Insurance Company, the company's head office moved from Toronto, Ontario to Kingston, Ontario.

In 1968, E-L Financial Corporation Limited acquired 94% of the outstanding shares of Empire Life. In 1987, E-L Financial acquired The Montreal Life Insurance Company, as well as the life insurance operations of The Dominion of Canada General Insurance Company, and adopted the marketing name of Empire Financial Group.

As part of this acquisition, Empire Life became a subsidiary of the holding company, E-L Financial Services Limited which now owns 98.3% of the company. The remaining 1.7% of Empire Life common shares are widely held by various individual shareholders. E-L Financial Services Limited is 100% owned by E-L Financial Corporation Limited.

In 1992, Empire Life acquired a block of group insurance business from the Metropolitan Life Insurance Company, and in 1993 acquired the non-participating individual insurance policies of The Citadel Life Assurance Company. In 1995, Empire Life agreed to administer and assume a block of deferred annuity and Registered Retirement Income Fund (RRIF) policies of Confederation Life Insurance Company. In 1997, Empire Life assumed a block of deferred annuity policies from Allstate Life Insurance Company of Canada. In 2000, Empire Life assumed a block of annuity and RRIF policies from Coopérants, Mutual Life Insurance Society.

On December 31, 1997, Empire Life acquired all the shares of Colonia Life Insurance Company and subsequently changed the name of the company to Concordia Life Insurance Company a year later. On January 1, 2002, Empire Life and Concordia amalgamated as one company under the name of The Empire Life Insurance Company (or L'Empire, Compagnie d'Assurance-Vie). From 1987 to 2005, Empire Life used the marketing name of Empire Financial Group but re-branded as Empire Life in 2006.

== Products ==
Individual Insurance Term life insurance, Permanent life insurance and Critical illness insurance

Wealth Management Segregated funds, Portfolio funds, Guaranteed Interest Options (GIOs), Registered Retirement Income Fund including a Guaranteed Minimum Withdrawal Benefit (GMWB) product, Group Registered Retirement Savings Plan, Mutual Funds through Empire Life Investments Inc.

Group Benefits Small and medium business group life and health insurance plans, group life and health insurance plans for 20+ employees, Administrative Services Only (ASO) contracts, cost plus arrangements and disability management

== Sponsorships and philanthropy ==
- Empire Life invests in communities across the country through charitable donations, employee volunteer hours, in-kind contributions and community sponsorships.
- Empire Life Invests $250,000 in Pathways to Education's Graduation Nation Initiative

== Corporate management ==
- Mark Sylvia, FCIP, FLMI, president and chief executive officer
- Richard Carty, MBA, senior vice-president
- Scott Ewert, senior vice-president and chief financial officer
- Paul Holba, CFA, senior vice-president and chief investment officer
- Erik Kalin, MBA, senior vice-president, operations, retail and group solutions
- Steve Pong, BSc, senior vice-president and chief operating officer, insurance and investments
- Gillian Purvis, LLB, B.Sc. (Hons), senior vice-president and General Counsel
- Mark Rogers, CA, senior vice-president, corporate development
- Chris Volk, BSc (Hons), senior vice-president and chief technology officer

== Board of directors ==
- Chair of the board: Duncan N.R. Jackman
- Directors: Stephanie Bowman, John F. Brierley, Scott F. Ewert, Mark J. Fuller, Peter J. Levitt, Benoit Patry, Clive P. Rowe, Mark A. Sylvia, Jacques Tremblay
- Honorary chair: The Honourable Henry N. R. Jackman
