= Milo Rowell =

American lawyer

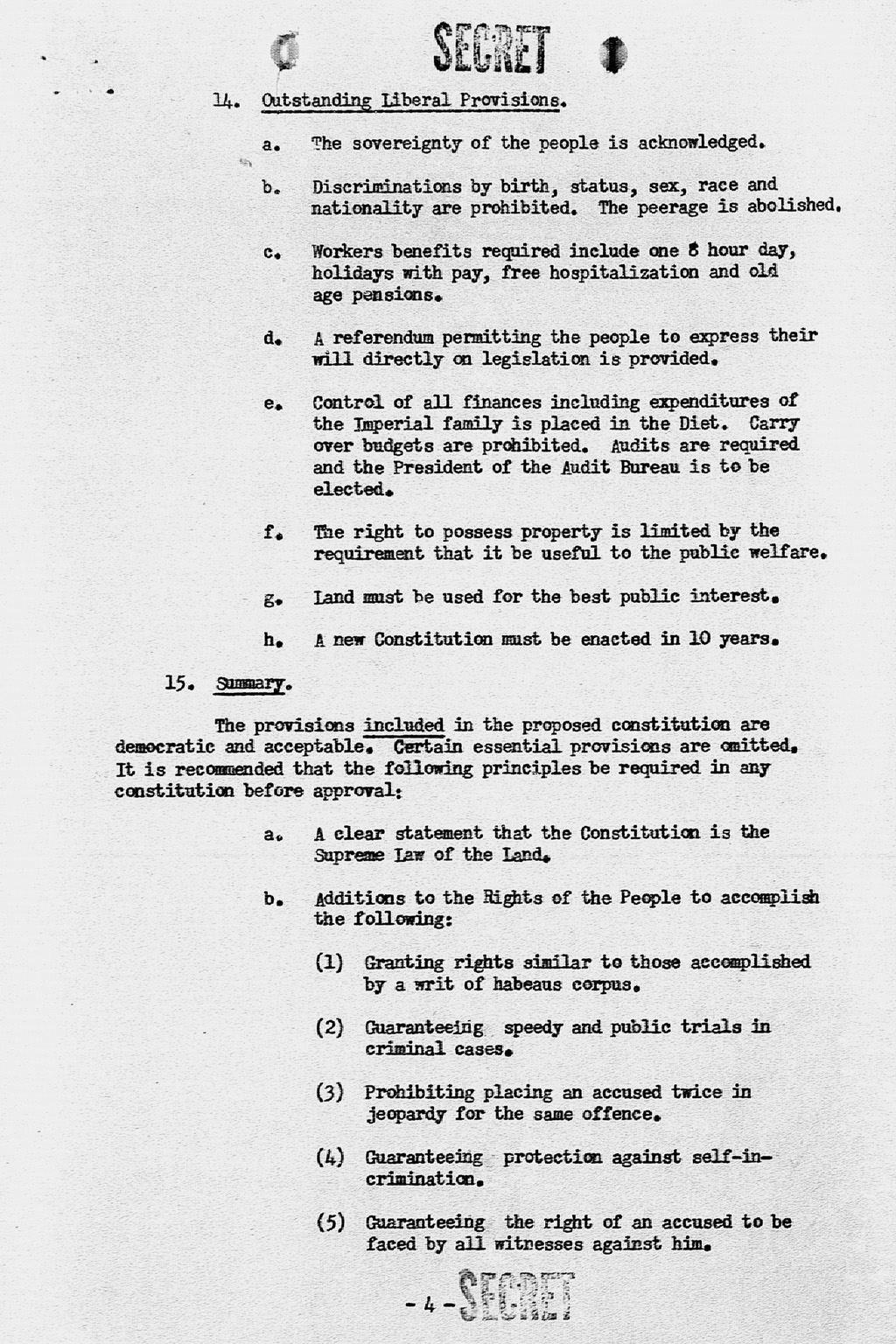
Rowell and Whitney analyzed the many proposals in Japan's postwar constitutional debate, and outlined them to form the framework of the Japanese Constitution of 1946.

Lt. Col. Milo E. Rowell (July 25, 1903 – October 7, 1977) was an American lawyer and Army officer best known for his role in drafting the Constitution of Japan.

Born in Fresno, California, Rowell graduated from Stanford University and Harvard Law School, and returned to Fresno in 1926 to open a private law practice there. He enlisted in the Army in 1943, where he studied occupation administration and also commanded troops in the Philippines.

Following Japan's surrender in 1945, Rowell moved to Tokyo and joined the occupation authority under Douglas MacArthur as Chief of Judicial Affairs. In this capacity, he worked with Brig. Gen. Courtney Whitney to prepare a draft constitution for the Diet of Japan to approve. Rowell extensively analyzed the existing Meiji Constitution, balancing it with the demands of Japanese lawyers to form a draft that was acceptable to both the Japanese government and the GHQ.

Rowell donated his papers to the University of Tokyo in 1965. They now serve as one of the key legislative history sources in Japanese constitutional law.

Later in life, Rowell supported establishment of a medical school in his home town of Fresno. This led to the establishment of the University of California San Francisco School of Medicine's Fresno-Central San Joaquin Valley Medical Education Program. In 1981 the auditorium of the new Medical Education Building on the campus of Fresno's VA Medical Center was named in Rowell's honor.
