= Harry Jackman =

Canadian businessman and politician (1900–1979)

Harry Jackman OC

Member of the Canadian Parliament for Rosedale
- In office 1940–1949
- Preceded by: Harry Gladstone Clarke
- Succeeded by: Charles Henry

Personal details
- Born: Henry Rutherford Jackman; November 5, 1900 Toronto, Ontario, Canada
- Died: November 22, 1979 (aged 79)
- Resting place: Mt. Pleasant Cemetery, Toronto
- Party: National Government; Progressive Conservative
- Spouse: Mary Coyne Rowell
- Children: 4
- Occupation: Businessman, lawyer

Henry Rutherford "Harry" Jackman, OC (November 5, 1900 – November 22, 1979) was a Canadian politician and successful entrepreneur. In 1973, he was made an Officer of the Order of Canada.

== Life and career ==
Jackman represented the electoral district of Rosedale in the House of Commons of Canada from 1940 to 1949. He was first elected in 1940 as a member of Robert Manion's World War II National Government caucus (which, despite the name, formed the Official Opposition in the House of Commons) after wresting his party's nomination from Conservative incumbent Harry Gladstone Clarke. Jackman was re-elected in 1945 as a Progressive Conservative. He ran again in 1949 but was defeated.

In business, Jackman built the Empire Life group of financial service companies during the Great Depression.

== Marriage and children ==
In 1930, Jackman married Mary Coyne Rowell (1904–1994), daughter of Canadian lawyer and politician Newton Rowell. Together, they had four children – Henry (Hal), Frederic (Eric), Edward and Nancy.
