= Canadian Women's Foundation =

Canadian non-profit organization

The Canadian Women's Foundation (French: Fondation Canadienne des Femmes) is a national non-profit organization focused on helping women and girls. It aims to end violence against women, move low-income women out of poverty, and empower girls.

The Canadian Women's Foundation is the only national women's foundation in Canada. Since 1991, it has invested over $40 million in charitable support to over 1,200 community programs and women's shelters across Canada.

== History ==
The Canadian Women's Foundation was founded in 1991 by Canadian Senator Nancy Ruth and her friend, Susan Woods. Ruth had previously talked with Rosemary Brown, a former Member of the Legislative Assembly of British Columbia, about what they believed to be a lack of resources for Canadian women. Ruth and her mother each donated $500,000 to launch the Canadian Women's Foundation, and Ruth's foundation, the NaRuth Foundation, donated an additional $50,000.

Since 1991, the Canadian Women's Foundation has become one of the largest women's foundations in the world. With the support of donors, the Foundation has raised more than $100 million and funded over 1,950 programs across the country.

The organization's first Board President was Julie White, who was also responsible for Canadian corporate donations at Levi Strauss & Co.

The current president and CEO is Mitzie Hunter, who joined the Foundation in 2024.

== Strategy ==
Vision: A Canada where gender equity is realized for all women and girls.

Mission: To be a catalyst for the most innovative programs, policies, and public engagement efforts creating transformative change in the lives of women and girls in Canada.

== Activities ==
The Canadian Women's Foundation provides funding for women's services including emergency shelters, programs that help women rebuild their lives after experiencing abuse, sex trafficking prevention programs, and violence prevention programs in schools. It also funds programs that aim to help women learn skilled trades, start businesses, and gain work experience. It funds programs that aim to empower girls with confidence through activities including sports, science and technology, media literacy, and mentorship.

In 2015, the Foundation launched a campaign called "Get Consent" which aims to promote understanding of the importance of sexual consent.

From November 25 to December 10, 2020, the Canadian Women's Foundation and the Body Shop Canada are teaming up during the 16 Days of Activism against Gender-Based Violence to #ActTogether and encourage people to take action on gender-based violence in Canada.

The 16 Days of Activism is a global campaign that takes place every year between November 25, the International Day for the Elimination of Violence against Women, and December 10, International Human Rights Day. It also includes December 6, Canada's Day of Remembrance and Action on Violence against Women, which marks the 1989 Montreal Massacre.

In 2020, The Foundation was able to chat with Elizabeth Renzetti, the winner of the 2020 Landsberg Award. Elizabeth won the award for her writings in gender equality and women's dearth in leadership. In the chat, Elizabeth shared her thoughts on the lessons learned from women's leadership during the Convid-19, the gendered impacts of the pandemic on women, and gender equality.

In June 2019, at the Women Deliver conference in Vancouver, B.C., the federal government announced a significant investment in funds for women's organizations to create a "long-term, sustainable funding legacy to accelerate gender equality in Canada."

Launched in 2019, the Black Innovation Fellowship aims to address key barriers Black entrepreneurs face while getting new businesses off the ground. The Canadian Women's Foundation is a founding partner of the Fellowship, which is run by Ryerson University's DMZ startup accelerator.

In 2017, Status of Women Canada selected the Canadian Women's Foundation to convene, facilitate and oversee the Gender Equality Network Canada. Over three years, this Network of about 150 women leaders from across the country will create an action plan to advance gender equality in Canada.

== Funding ==
On December 17, 2020 the Canadian Government announced it would contribute $20.6 million to support the Canadian Women's Foundation. This funding resulted from an increased need for gender-based violence (GBV) services as a result of the COVID-19 pandemic.
