= 2017 New Democratic Party leadership election =

Party election in Canada

- October 1, 2017
- Turnout: 52.8% (▲1.9pp)
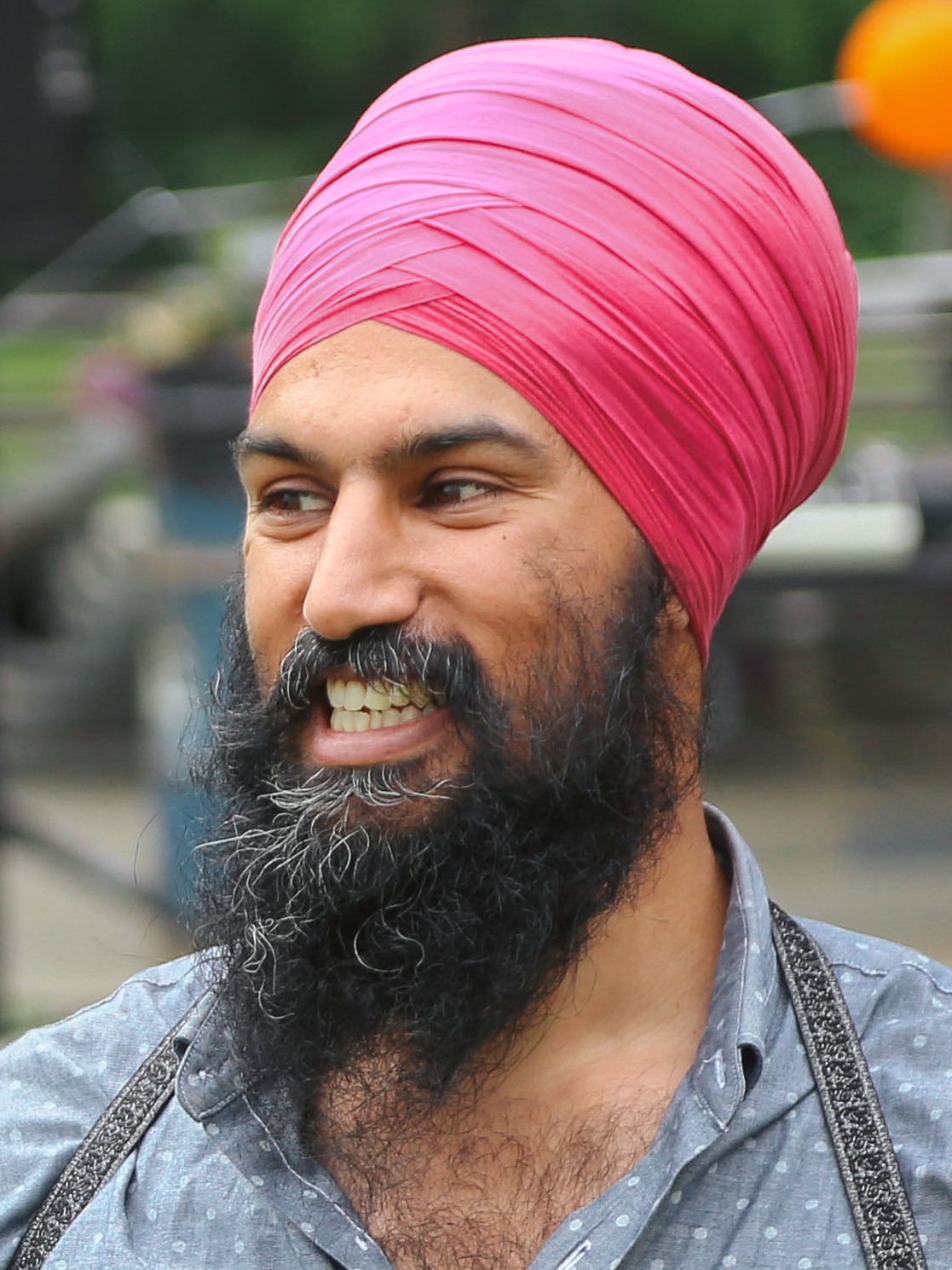

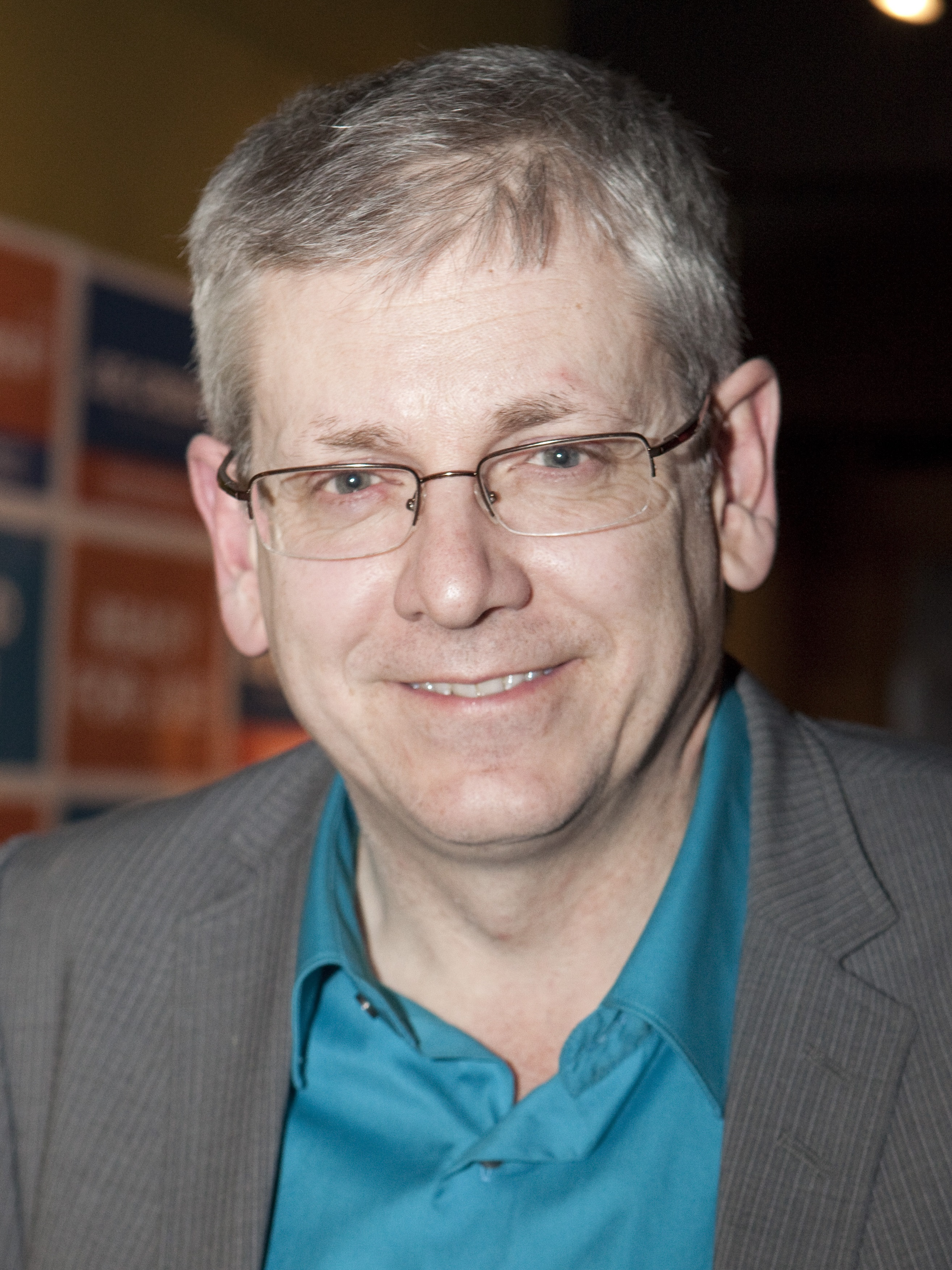

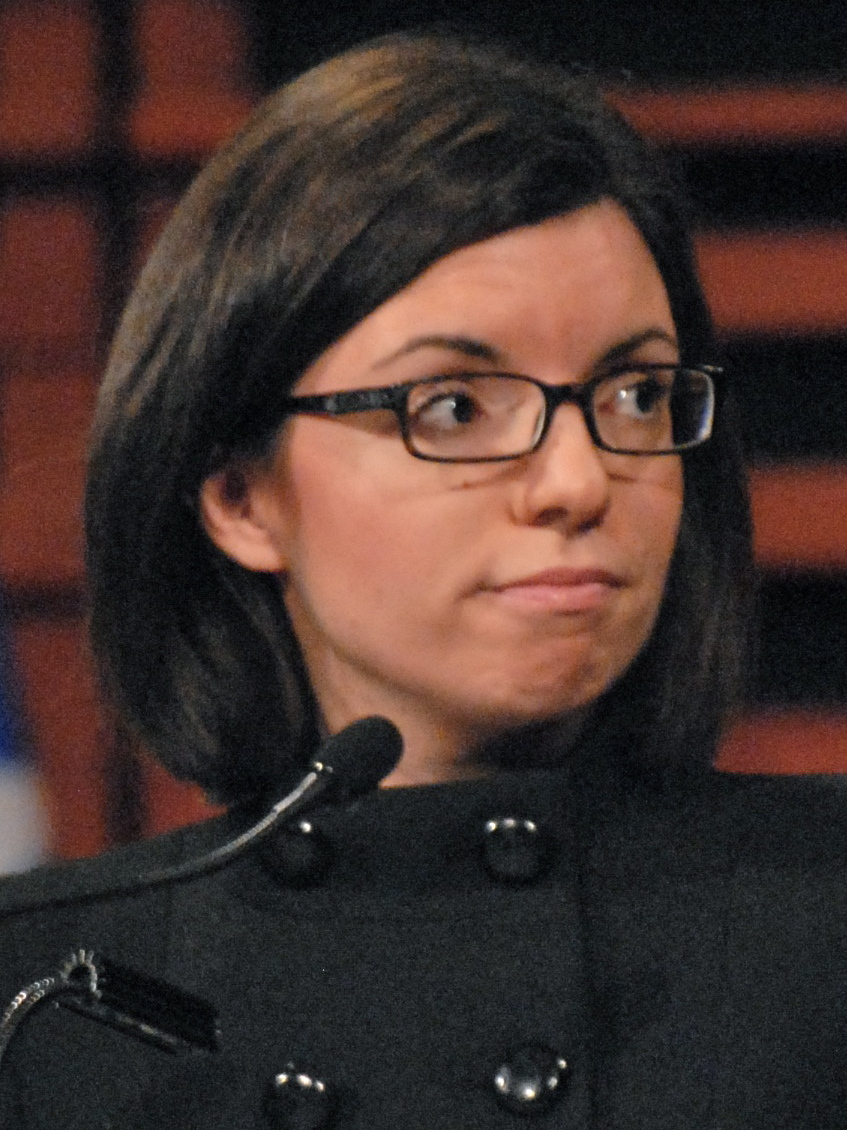

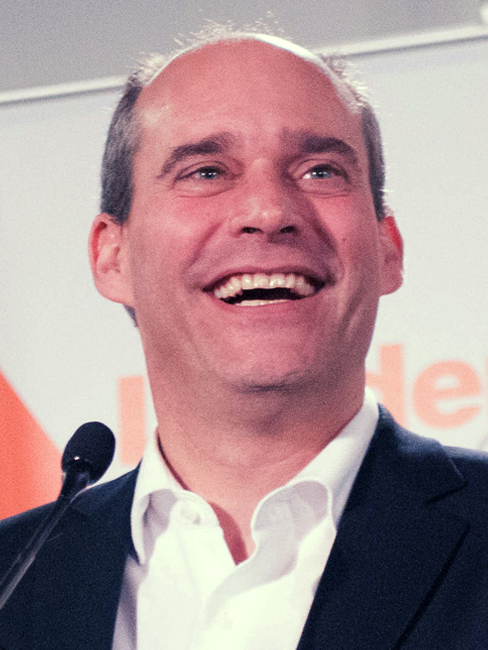
Candidate	Jagmeet Singh	Charlie Angus
Popular vote	35,266	12,705
Percentage	53.83%	19.39%
Candidate	Niki Ashton	Guy Caron
Popular vote	11,374	6,164
Percentage	17.36%	9.41%
Leader before election
Thomas Mulcair
Elected Leader
Jagmeet Singh

2017 New Democratic Party leadership election
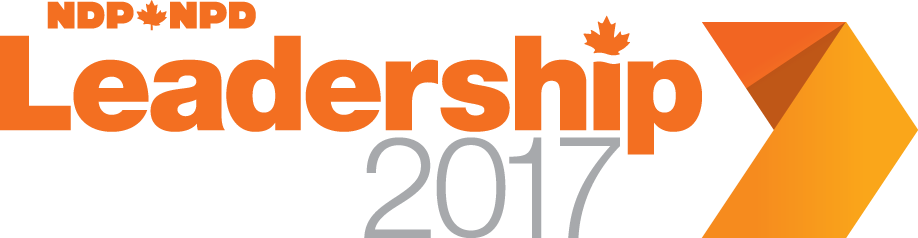
- Date: October 1, 2017
- Convention: Metropolitan Ball Room, Westin Harbour Castle, Toronto
- Resigning leader: Tom Mulcair
- Won by: Jagmeet Singh
- Ballots: 1
- Candidates: 4
- Entrance fee: $30,000
- Spending limit: $1.5 million

In 2017, the New Democratic Party held a leadership election to choose a successor to Tom Mulcair. The election was triggered by Mulcair having lost a leadership review at the party's federal convention held in Edmonton, Alberta, on April 10, 2016, which resulted in a majority of delegates voting in favour of holding a new leadership election. Mulcair declined to partake in the subsequent leadership election and stated that he would remain leader until the party chose a replacement.

Four candidates were on the leadership ballot: Charlie Angus, Niki Ashton, Guy Caron, and Jagmeet Singh. The voting process occurred on Sunday, October 1, 2017. Every party member was entitled to cast a secret vote in the leadership election using either a ranked ballot and Instant-runoff voting, or potentially repeated rounds of voting under exhaustive voting, with each member being able to choose one format or the other for their vote. Had no candidate received a majority of votes in the first round of voting, the least-popular candidate would have been dropped and an additional vote count held once a week until October 15, 2017, or until a candidate received a majority of votes.

Singh, the only non-MP in the race, formally announced his candidacy for the leadership on May 15, 2017. Singh received the support of 11 MPs, the most of any candidate, including former leadership candidates Nathan Cullen and Peter Julian, in addition to the support of major labour unions such as the United Food and Commercial Workers. Media attention surrounding his campaign noted the fact that, if elected, Singh would be the first visible minority person to lead a major federal party, as well as the first of the Sikh faith.

Singh was elected in the first round, with 53.8% of the votes, thus rendering the need for subsequent rounds of voting unnecessary. Following his election as leader, Singh appointed former leadership rival Guy Caron to serve as the New Democratic Party's Parliamentary Leader.

== Background ==
The result at the 2016 convention was the first time a leader of any Canadian federal political party has failed to receive at least 50% in a leadership review vote. In the months since the 2015 federal election, Mulcair's leadership had been a point of conflict within the party because of the election campaign, in which the NDP fell to third place from the Official Opposition status it gained in the 2011 election. The New Democrats had led public opinion polls since May 2015 and appeared to be poised to win their first federal election in history. However, they fell back behind the Liberals and Conservatives in the last month. The election thus resulted in a Liberal majority government.

The party lost more than half of its seats and fell to third place. Mulcair's leadership faced criticism following the election, particularly due to his moderate platform that the party was running on. In contrast, Liberal leader Justin Trudeau had promised to run a budget deficit to fund stimulus programs and higher social spending, a position which was perceived as the Liberals outflanking the NDP on the left.

== Election rules ==
Under rules set out in the party's constitution, every member was entitled to cast a secret ballot for the selection of the Leader. The new leader was chosen on October 1, 2017, on the first round of voting through a combination of preferential ballots and X voting. Had a leader not been chosen in the first round, additional vote counts would have taken place once a week until a candidate hit the 50 per cent plus one mark, to be declared leader (with eligible voters that chose to vote with an internet ballot being allowed to change their vote at any time before the closure of the polls, including between each round of balloting).

Candidates were required to pay an entry fee of $30,000 and spend no more than $1.5 million. 25% of all donations to candidates were paid to the party. To be nominated, candidates required at least 500 signatures from party members, at least half of which must be from female-identified members and at least 100 from "other equity-seeking groups" including indigenous people, LGBT people, persons with disabilities and visible minorities. At least 50 signatures were required from each of five regions: the Atlantic, Quebec, Ontario, the Prairies and B.C., and the North.

== Timeline ==
=== 2015 ===
- October 19 – In the 2015 general election, the NDP under Tom Mulcair wins 44 seats and falls to third place in the House of Commons, down from the 95 seats and Official Opposition status held prior to the election.

=== 2016 ===
- April 10 – At the NDP convention in Edmonton, a leadership review resolution passes with the support of 52% of delegates, requiring a new leadership election to be held. Mulcair announces that he will not be a candidate, but will remain as leader until his successor is chosen. Delegates pass an emergency motion extending the deadline for a leadership election to two years from one year.
- May 15 – NDP Federal Council meets to discuss a schedule and logistics for the leadership election. The federal council decides to hold the election between September 17, 2017, and October 31, 2017, with a precise date to be set later.
- June 7 – Cheri DiNovo launches her campaign as an "unofficial candidate", in protest of the party's $30,000 entry fee.
- June 13 – Cheri DiNovo announces that her campaign will become official.
- June 14 – Party executive convenes to propose finalized election details, including the dates of the election and the nomination period closing.
- July 2 – Nomination period opens.
- August 2 – Cheri DiNovo withdraws her candidacy.

=== 2017 ===
- February 12 – Peter Julian launches his campaign.
- February 26 – Charlie Angus launches his campaign.
- February 27 – Guy Caron launches his campaign.
- March 7 – Niki Ashton launches her campaign.
- March 12 – Leadership debate held in Ottawa in English and French.
- March 26 – Leadership debate held in Montreal in English and French.
- April 20 – Pat Stogran launches his campaign.
- May 15 – Jagmeet Singh launches his campaign.
- May 28 – Leadership debate held in Sudbury in English and French.
- June 3 – Pat Stogran withdraws his candidacy.
- June 11 – Leadership debate held in St. John's.
- June 22 – Leadership debate on labour issues hosted by the United Steelworkers held in Toronto.
- July 3 – Nomination period closes.
- July 6 – Peter Julian withdraws his candidacy.
- July 11 – Leadership debate held in Saskatoon.
- August 2 – Leadership debate held in Victoria.
- August 17 – Deadline to become an NDP member and be eligible to vote.
- August 27 – Leadership debate held in Montreal in French.
- September 10 – Leadership debate held in Vancouver.
- September 17 – All-candidate "showcase" held in Hamilton featuring final speeches.
- September 18 – Voting for first ballot begins by mail and online.
- September 27 – HuffPost debate held online.
- October 1 – Voting for first ballot ended at 2 p.m. EDT. Results were announced in Toronto, shortly after 3 p.m. EDT, in the Metropolitan Ball Room of the Westin Harbour Castle. Jagmeet Singh won a majority of the votes cast in the first ballot.

== Debates ==
Debates among candidates for the 2017 New Democratic Party of Canada leadership election
No.	Date	Time	Place	Host	Participants					
P Participant. I Invitee. N Non-invitee. A Absent invitee. O Out of race (exploring or withdrawn).					Angus	Ashton	Caron	Julian	Singh	Stogran
Debates
1	March 12, 2017	2 p.m. EDT	Delta Ottawa City Centre Hotel; Ottawa, ON	New Democratic Party	P	P	P	P	O	O
2	March 26, 2017	2 p.m. EDT	Palais des congrès de Montréal; Montreal, QC	New Democratic Party	P	P	P	P	O	O
3	May 28, 2017	2 p.m. EDT	Cambrian College; Sudbury, ON	New Democratic Party	P	P	P	P	P	P
4	June 11, 2017	3 p.m. NDT	St. John's Convention Centre; St. John's, NL	New Democratic Party	P	P	P	P	P	O
5	June 22, 2017	7 p.m. EDT	Isabel Bader Theatre; Toronto, ON	United Steelworkers	P	P	P	P	P	O
6	July 11, 2017	6 p.m. CST	TCU Place; Saskatoon, SK	New Democratic Party	P	P	P	O	P	O
7	August 2, 2017	6 p.m. PDT	Victoria Conference Centre; Victoria, BC	New Democratic Party	A	P	P	O	P	O
8	August 27, 2017	2 p.m. EDT	Club Soda; Montreal, QC	New Democratic Party	P	P	P	O	P	O
9	September 10, 2017	11:30 a.m. PDT	York Theatre; Vancouver, BC	New Democratic Party	P	P	P	O	P	O
10	September 27, 2017	7 p.m. EDT (English), 8 p.m. EDT (French)	online	HuffPost	P	P	P	O	P	O
Showcase
-	September 17, 2017	1:30 p.m. EDT	Hamilton Convention Centre; Hamilton, ON	New Democratic Party	P	P	P	O	P	O

== Official candidates ==
=== Charlie Angus ===
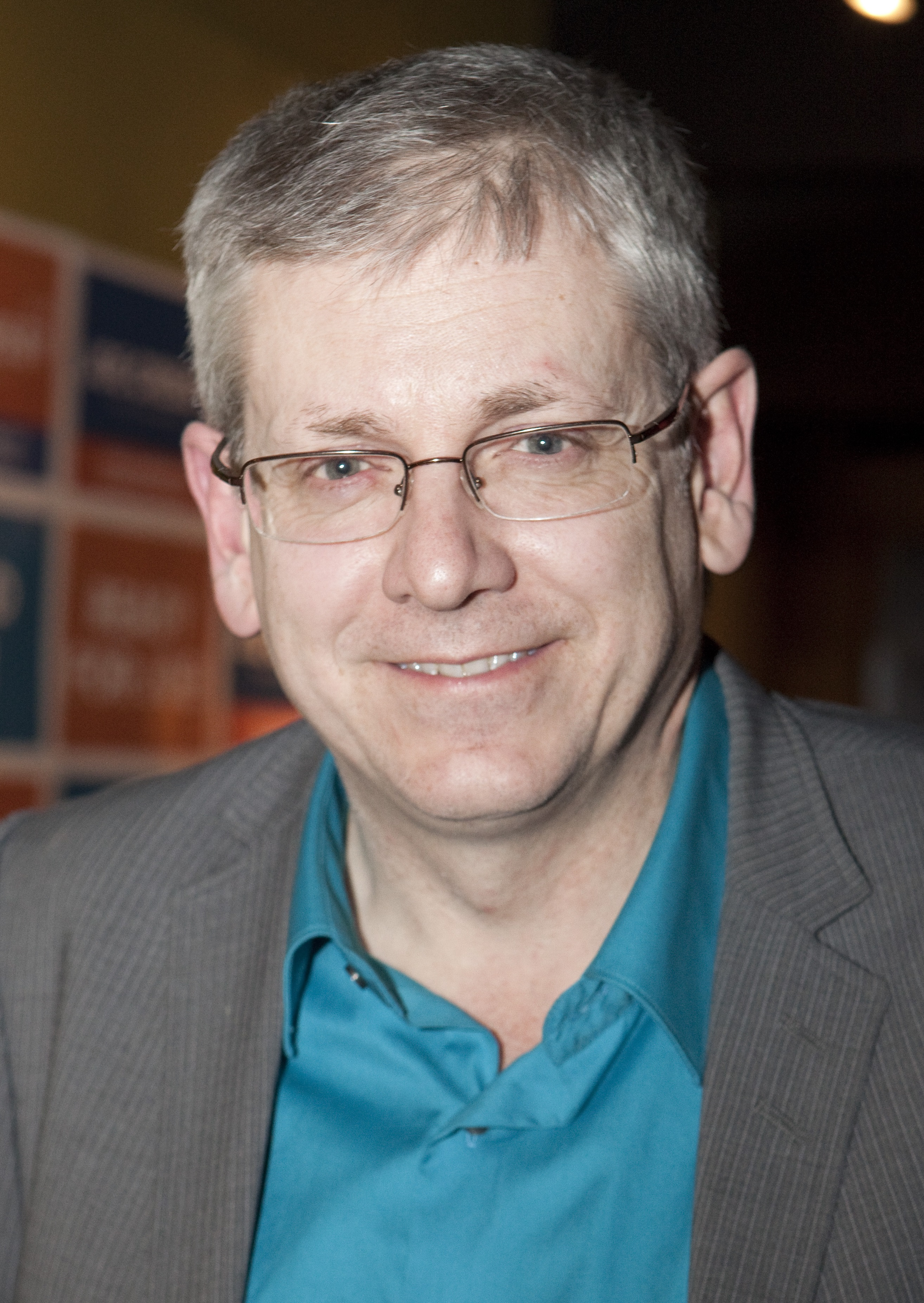
Charlie Angus

Charlie Angus, 64, has been the MP for Timmins-James Bay since 2004 and was elected NDP Caucus Chair in January 2016. He is the author of eight books and worked as a journalist, a roofer, and a dishwasher earlier in life. Before entering politics, Angus was a member of the Toronto punk band L'Étranger with Andrew Cash and Peter Duffin, from 1980 to circa 1984, and subsequently formed the country band Grievous Angels in 1986. From 1985 to 1990, Angus and his wife Brit Griffin lived in Angelus House, a Catholic Worker house they founded, where they invited the homeless to live with them. They also established a separate homeless shelter in 1986. In 1990, they moved to northern Ontario, where Angus owned and ran a magazine and eventually entered politics. Angus stepped down as Caucus Chair and Indigenous Affairs Critic on November 23, 2016, to consider a leadership bid. He formally registered his campaign with Elections Canada on February 20, 2017, and publicly launched it on February 26.

Date candidacy registered: February 20, 2017
Date campaign launched: February 26, 2017
Campaign website: charlieangusndp.ca
Other information:
- Has emphasized job security, the high cost of post-secondary education and Indigenous issues.
- Angus is not as fluent in French as some of the other candidates but is said to have a good basis in the language.

=== Niki Ashton ===
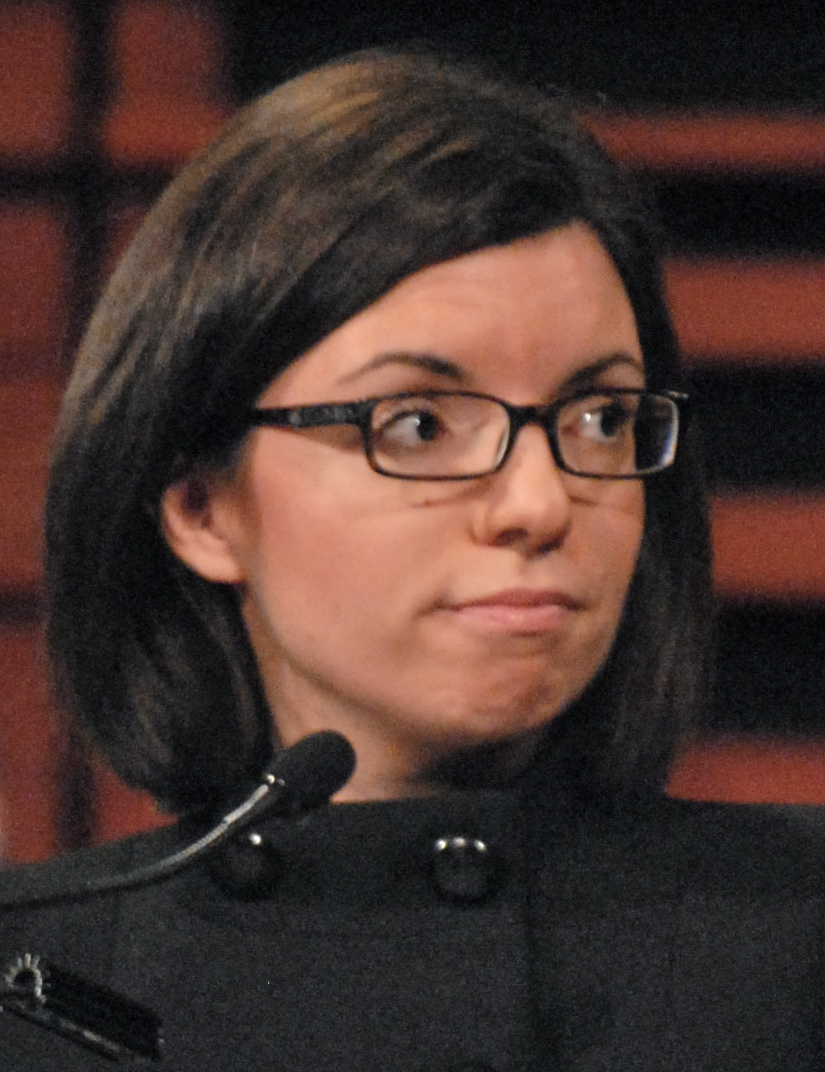
Niki Ashton

Niki Ashton, 44, has been the MP for Churchill—Keewatinook Aski under its current name since 2015 and was previously the MP for Churchill beginning in 2008. She served as NDP Critic for Jobs, Employment & Workforce Development Critic (2015–2017), Shadow Minister for Status of Women (2012–2015) and Aboriginal Affairs (2015). She placed seventh in the 2012 leadership race. She is the daughter of former Manitoba NDP MLA Steve Ashton, who served as a minister in the cabinets of Gary Doer and Greg Selinger.

Date candidacy registered: March 2, 2017
Date campaign launched: March 7, 2017
Campaign website: nikiashton2017.ca
Other information:
- Planned to create and maintain good-paying jobs for young people and working Canadians, and tackling the threat of climate change.
- Committed to providing tuition-free post-secondary education.
- Advocates combatting the unequal distribution of wealth, the loss of value-added jobs, the "foreign ownership and trade deals that are selling us out".

=== Guy Caron ===
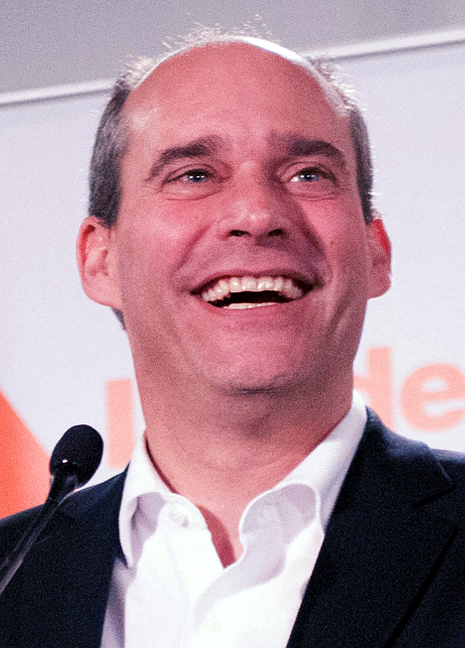
Guy Caron

Guy Caron, 58, has been the MP for Rimouski-Neigette—Témiscouata—Les Basques since 2011, NDP Finance Critic (2015–2017), Quebec caucus chair (2011–2017), Shadow Minister for Natural Resources, and Shadow Minister for Industry (2011–2012). Caron resigned as NDP Finance Critic and Quebec caucus chair on February 12, 2017, to prepare to enter the leadership contest. He announced his candidacy on February 27, 2017.

Date candidacy registered: February 27, 2017
Date campaign launched: February 27, 2017
Campaign website: en.guycaron.ca
Other information:
- Promised to address income inequity by introducing a guaranteed basic income for Canadians.
- Campaigned on climate change as his second major plank.

=== Jagmeet Singh ===
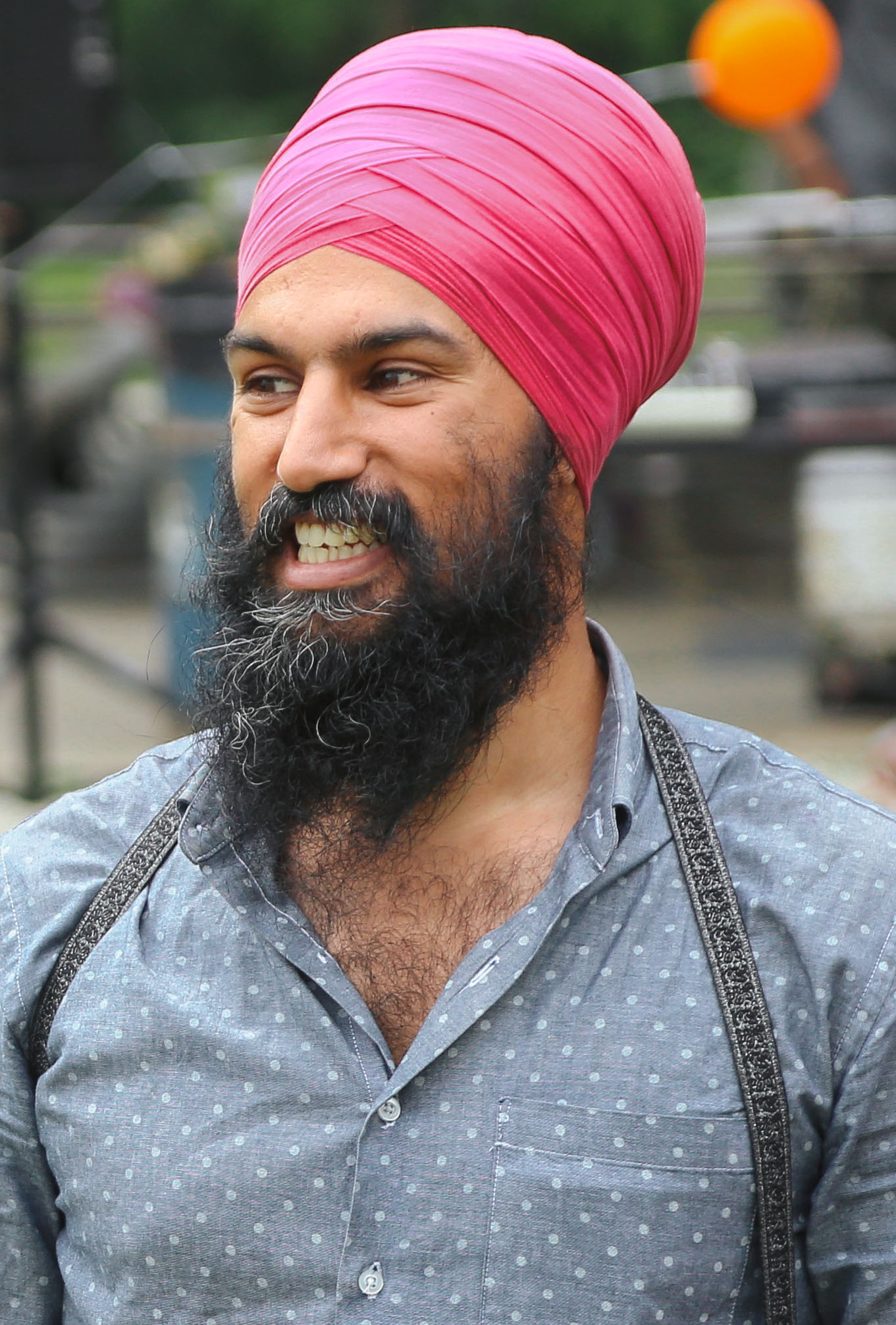
Jagmeet Singh

Jagmeet Singh, 47, was the Ontario MPP for Bramalea—Gore—Malton (2011–2017) and was Deputy Leader of the Ontario New Democratic Party from 2015 until entering the federal leadership contest on May 15, 2017. He was previously the federal NDP candidate in Bramalea—Gore—Malton in 2011.

Date candidacy registered: May 18, 2017
Date campaign launched: May 15, 2017
Campaign website: jagmeetsingh.ca
Other information:
- Singh's election made him the first visible minority person to lead a major federal party, as well as the first of the Sikh faith.
- The four core focuses of Singh's campaign were inequality, climate change, reconciliation with indigenous peoples, and electoral reform.
- Singh has stated his preference for ending the War on Drugs by pursuing the Portuguese model of decriminalizing personal possession of all narcotics and instead promoting harm reduction for users.

== Withdrawn candidates ==
=== Cheri DiNovo ===
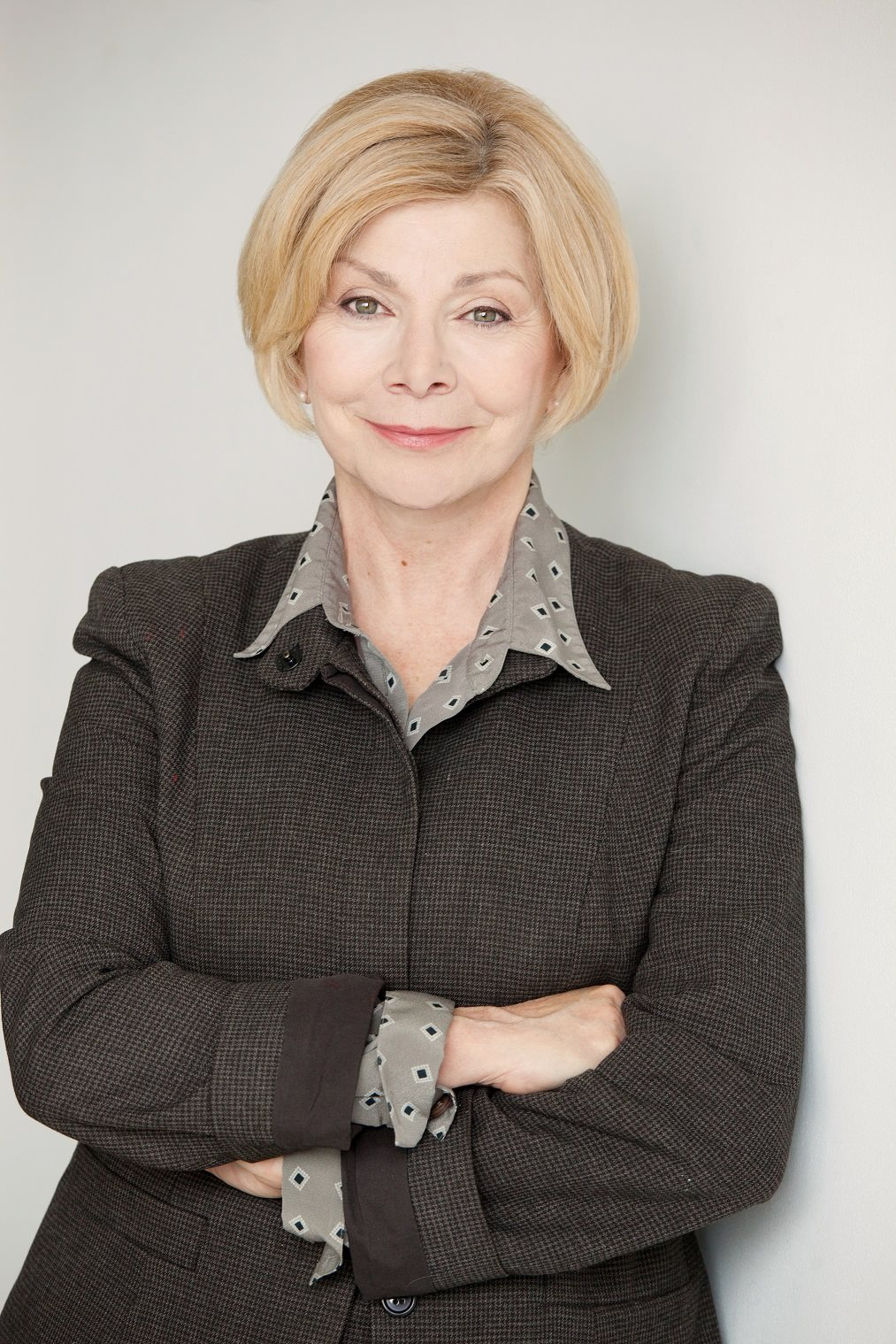
Cheri DiNovo

Cheri DiNovo, 65, is the Ontario MPP for Parkdale—High Park (2006–2017) and since 2014 has served as the Ontario NDP critic for Urban Transportation, Greater Toronto Area Issues, and LGBTQ Issues.

Date candidacy announced: June 7, 2016 ("unofficial"); June 13, 2016 (official).
Date withdrawn: August 2, 2016
Subsequently endorsed: Niki Ashton
Other information:
- DiNovo originally was running as an "unofficial candidate" in protest of the party's $30,000 entry fee, but on June 13, 2016, she announced that her candidacy would be moving from unofficial status to official status, stating that her campaign will begin fundraising when the leadership election rules are finalized in July 2016. She was running to support democratic socialist principles and "to fight for principles rather than for a position". Four main policy planks were: An "aggressive and realistic response to the climate crisis" including the banning of nuclear power and opposition to pipelines; "social justice and human rights" including a ban on conversion therapy and a plan to increase unionization rates; "an end to systemic racism" around indigenous issues, support for Black Lives Matter; "truly universal and free" post-secondary education, dental care and pharmacare and "livable" social assistance rates.
- DiNovo announced on August 2, 2016, that she would no longer be a candidate for health reasons, having recently suffered two small strokes.

=== Peter Julian ===
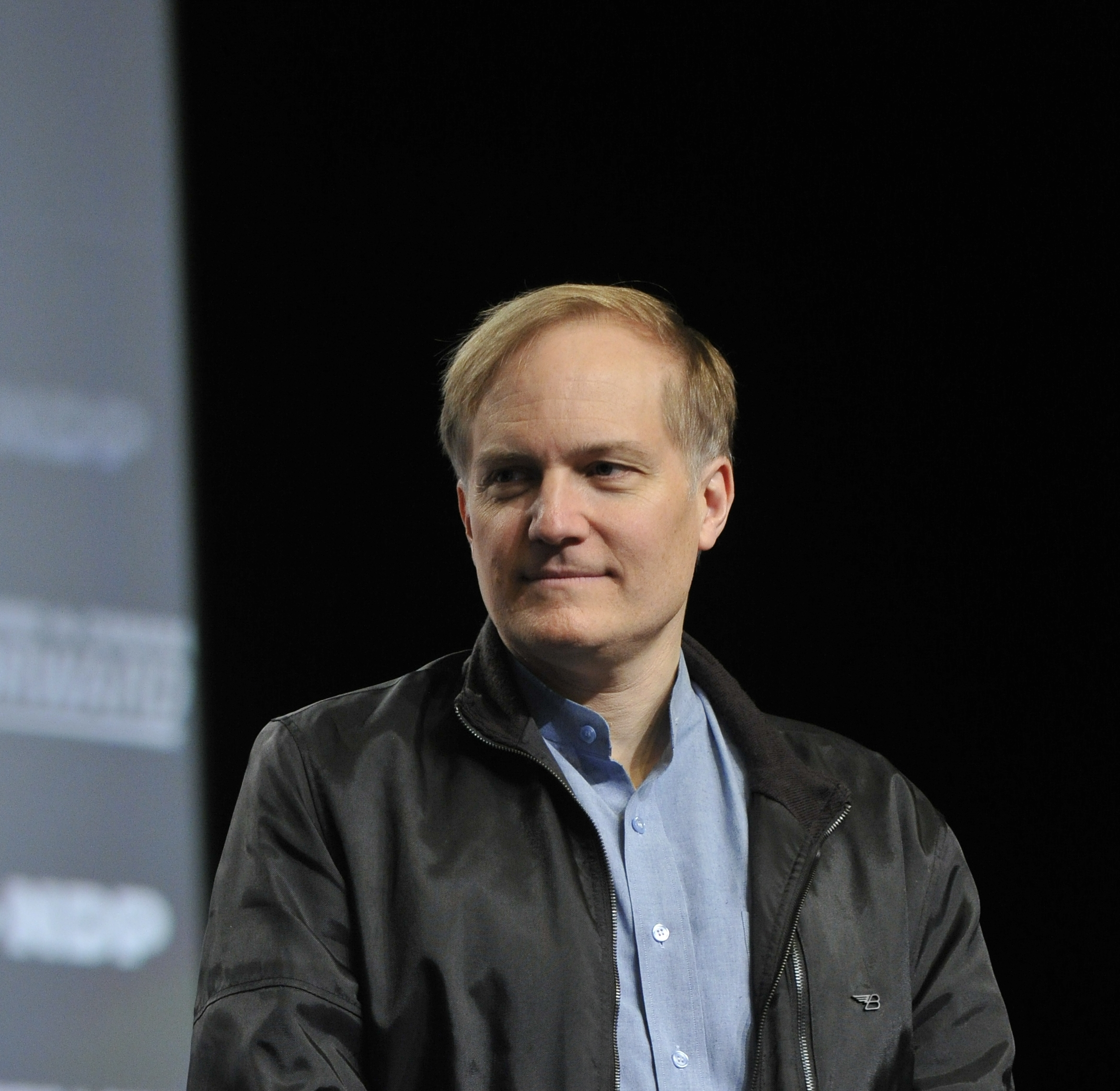
Peter Julian

Peter Julian, 64, is the MP for New Westminster—Burnaby (2015–2025) and was previously the MP for Burnaby—New Westminster (2004–2015). From 2014 to 2016, Julian was the NDP's house leader. He is the NDP's former Shadow Minister for Natural Resources and Energy (2012–2014), Finance (2011–2012) and Industry (2011) and has also served as NDP Caucus Chair (2011–2014). Before entering politics he was the executive director of the Council of Canadians. He resigned as NDP House Leader on October 19, 2016, to consider his candidacy. He officially registered his candidacy on December 21, 2016, and formally launched his campaign on February 12, 2017.

Date candidacy registered: December 21, 2016
Date campaign launched: February 12, 2017
Date withdrawn: July 6, 2017
Subsequently endorsed: Jagmeet Singh
Campaign website: peterjulian.ca
Other information:
- Opposes growing inequality and favours affordable housing, would eliminate overseas tax havens and tax breaks for "the one percent". Advocates free tuition for post-secondary education and action on climate change and indigenous issues, has opposed pipeline development.
- Withdrew due to poor fundraising results.

=== Pat Stogran ===
Pat Stogran, 68, is the former Veteran's Ombudsman (2007–2010) and a retired Colonel of the Canadian Forces (Princess Patricia's Canadian Light Infantry). Stogran studied engineering at Royal Roads Military College in Colwood, British Columbia, and holds a master's degree in strategic studies from the United States Army War College. He served with the military in both Bosnia and Afghanistan.

Date candidacy registered: April 17, 2017
Date campaign launched: April 20, 2017
Date withdrawn: June 3, 2017
Subsequently endorsed: Charlie Angus
Campaign website: patstogran.ca [broken link]
Other information:
- Withdrew after complaining the party had put "major obstacles" in place making it difficult for candidates to grow the party's base.

== Failed to qualify ==
Candidates who declared their candidacies but were unable to complete the process of submitting their nomination forms and deposits to the party by the deadline of July 3, 2017:

=== David Berlin ===
David Berlin, 66, is the former editor and owner of the Literary Review of Canada and was the co-founder of the general interest magazine, The Walrus, as well as its editor from 2003 to 2004. He was the federal NDP's candidate in Toronto Centre in the 2000 federal election and was founder and leader of The Bridge Party of Canada, running as its candidate in University—Rosedale in the 2015 federal election. Declared candidacy and passed vetting by party but failed to submit deposit and/or sufficient nomination signatures by deadline.

Date candidacy registered:
Date campaign launched: June 19, 2017

=== Ibrahim Bruno El-Khoury ===
El-Khoury was born in Beirut, Lebanon but moved to Kingston, Ontario in 1991. He is a former Montreal municipal candidate (2013) who is the founder of a consulting firm in Montreal. He ran for the NDP nomination in Papineau in the 2015 election, losing to Anne Lagacé Dowson, and was a city council candidate for centrist municipal party Vrai changement pour Montréal in 2013. Registered with Elections Canada but failed to submit deposit and/or sufficient nomination signatures by deadline.

Date candidacy registered: March 27, 2017

=== Brian Graff ===
Graff is a 58-year-old former Toronto municipal candidate (2014), community activist, and semi-retired financial analyst. Graff's application to run was rejected twice by NDP officials. He claimed it was because of his policy to cut immigration, while the party said it was on the grounds that he does not support party policy, as well as due to a 1993 charge for watching and besetting, which resulted in a conditional discharge. Graff took the NDP to court in March through a "judicial review" on the grounds that the party had violated natural justice, and this resulted in a settlement allowing him to apply a second time. After the party's second rejection, Graff returned to court with a second judicial review in an attempt to require the NDP to permit him to run. The party argued it was not subject to judicial review. On June 9, 2017, the court ruled that the NDP and other political parties are subject to judicial review, but that the party's actions were not unreasonable in rejecting Graff's application to stand for leader.

== Declined ==
- Karl Bélanger – National Director of the NDP (2016), Principal Secretary to NDP Leader Tom Mulcair (2012–2016), Senior Press Secretary to NDP Leader Jack Layton (2003–2011)
- Cindy Blackstock – executive director of First Nations Child and Family Caring Society of Canada.
- Daniel Blaikie – MP for Elmwood—Transcona (2015–2024).
- Rebecca Blaikie – President of the NDP (2011–2016), Treasurer of the NDP (2009–2011).
- Robert Chisholm – MP for Dartmouth—Cole Harbour (2011–2015), Leader of the Nova Scotia New Democratic Party (1996–2000), Leader of the Opposition in Nova Scotia (1998–1999). Withdrawn 2012 leadership candidate.
- Alexandre Boulerice – MP for Rosemont—La Petite-Patrie (2011–present) and NDP Quebec lieutenant. (Endorsed Julian before his withdrawal)
- Ruth Ellen Brosseau – MP for Berthier—Maskinongé (2011–2019). (Endorsed Caron)
- Olivia Chow – MP for Trinity—Spadina (2006–2014), widow of former leader Jack Layton. Placed third in the 2014 Toronto mayoral election.
- Nathan Cullen – MP for Skeena—Bulkley Valley (2004–2019), placed third in the 2012 leadership race.
- Paul Dewar – MP for Ottawa Centre (2006–2015), placed fifth in the 2012 leadership race.
- Gary Doer – Canadian Ambassador to the United States (2009–2016), Premier of Manitoba (1999–2009), Leader of the Manitoba New Democratic Party (1988–2009), Manitoba MLA for Concordia (1986–2009).
- Howard Hampton – Leader of the Ontario New Democratic Party (1996–2009), Attorney General of Ontario (1990–1993), Ontario Minister of Natural Resources and Minister Responsible for Native Affairs (both 1993–1995), Ontario MPP for Rainy River (1987–1999) and Kenora—Rainy River (1999–2011). (Endorsed Caron)
- Wab Kinew – Manitoba NDP MLA, former CBC broadcaster, Leader of the Manitoba NDP following the 2017 leadership of Manitoba NDP. (Endorsed Singh)
- Naomi Klein – author, journalist, and documentary filmmaker. Co-author of the Leap Manifesto.
- Mike Layton – Toronto City Councillor (2010–2022), son of former leader Jack Layton
- Megan Leslie – MP for Halifax (2008–2015) and NDP deputy leader (2012–2015).
- Avi Lewis – documentary filmmaker, broadcaster, and co-author of the Leap Manifesto, son of former Ontario NDP leader Stephen Lewis and grandson of former federal NDP leader David Lewis.
- Anne McGrath – Deputy Chief of Staff to Alberta Premier Rachel Notley (2015–2019), National Director of the NDP (2014–2015), President of the NDP (2006–2009).
- Tom Mulcair – Leader of the Opposition (2012–2015), incumbent Leader of the NDP (2012–2017), MP for Outremont (2007–2018).
- Rachel Notley – Premier of Alberta (2015–2019), leader of the Alberta New Democratic Party (2014–2024), Alberta MLA for Edmonton-Strathcona (2008–2024).
- Sid Ryan – President of the Ontario Federation of Labour (2009–2015), President of CUPE Ontario (1992–2009), Ontario provincial NDP candidate in 1999 in Scarborough Centre, and in Oshawa in 2003 and 2007, and federal NDP candidate in Oshawa in 2004 and 2006. (Endorsed Ashton)
- Romeo Saganash – MP for Abitibi—Baie-James—Nunavik—Eeyou (2011–2019). Ran in the 2012 leadership race though withdrew before the vote. (Endorsed Ashton)
- Peter Stoffer – MP for Sackville—Eastern Shore (2004–2015) and Sackville—Musquodoboit Valley—Eastern Shore (1997–2004).
- Brian Topp – Chief of Staff to Alberta Premier Rachel Notley (2015–2016), President of the NDP (2011). Runner up in the 2012 leadership race. (Endorsed Caron)
- Hassan Yussuff – President of the Canadian Labour Congress (2014–2021).

== Opinion polling ==
Some earlier polls include candidates who ultimately did not enter the race.

=== New Democratic Party members ===
Date(s) administered	Polling firm/Link	Sample size	Margin of error	Charlie Angus	Niki Ashton	Guy Caron	Peter Julian	Jagmeet Singh	Other/ Undecided
September 27, 2017	Mainstreet	1,601	± 2%	29.4%	17.9%	14.4%	—	38.2%	(Note: Undecideds distributed to candidates they are "leaning" towards)
September 27, 2017	Mainstreet	1,601	± 2%	26.1%	15.5%	13.8%	—	33.1%	Undecided 12.8%
September 8–11, 2017	Campaign Research	54	N/A	26.0%	16.0%	13.0%	—	18.0%	Undecided 27.0%
September 7–9, 2017	Mainstreet	2,009	± 2%	25.0%	13.0%	9.8%	—	27.3%	Undecided 25.0%
August 3–6, 2017	Mainstreet	1,804	± 1.8%	41.7%	27.9%	16.7%	—	13.6%	
August 3–6, 2017	Mainstreet	1,804	± 1.8%	28.2%	17.2%	10.7%	—	8.6%	Undecided 35.3%
July 5, 2017	Mainstreet	1,445	± 2.56%	24.4%	21.7%	7.97%	—	6.63%	Undecided 38.7%
July 5, 2017	Mainstreet	1,445	± 2.56%	22.6%	20.4%	7.4%	7.4%	6.1%	Undecided 35.9%
June 9–12, 2017	Campaign Research	86	± 2%	19%	9%	10%	10%	16%	Undecided 21% Someone else 16%

=== New Democratic Party voters / supporters ===
Date(s) administered	Polling firm/Link	Sample size	Margin of error	Charlie Angus	Niki Ashton	Guy Caron	Peter Julian	Jagmeet Singh	Other/ Undecided
September 8–11, 2017	Campaign Research	na	± 2.3%	8.0%	7.0%	8.0%	—	17.0%	Undecided/Someone else 59.0%
June 9–12, 2017	Campaign Research	489	± 2%	8%	5%	4%	6%	6%	Undecided 58% Someone else 14%
April 25 – May 17, 2017	Probit Inc.	891	± 3.3%	31%	24%	11%	14%	11%	Pat Stogran 3% Alexandre Boulerice (write-in) 1% Nathan Cullen (write-in) 1% Tom Mulcair (write-in) 1% Sid Ryan (write-in after April 27) 1% Someone else 1%
June 3–9, 2016	Probit Inc.	908	± 3.25%	9%	6%	–	4%	2%	Olivia Chow 29% Alexandre Boulerice 18% Paul Dewar 9% Peggy Nash 9% Ruth Ellen Brosseau 5% Romeo Saganash 3% Nathan Cullen (write-in) 2% Megan Leslie (write-in) 2% Tom Mulcair (write-in) 1% Someone else 2%
April 14–15, 2016	Mainstreet Research	598	± 4.01%	–	4%	–	10%	11%	Nathan Cullen 17% Avi Lewis 11% Alexandre Boulerice 4% Undecided 26% Someone else 17%

=== All Canadians ===
Date(s) administered	Polling firm/Link	Sample size	Margin of error	Charlie Angus	Niki Ashton	Guy Caron	Peter Julian	Jagmeet Singh	Other/ Undecided
September 8–11, 2017	Campaign Research	1770	± 2.3%	6.0%	5.0%	6.0%	—	11.0%	Undecided 58% Someone else 15%
June 9–12, 2017	Campaign Research	2767	± 2%	5%	3%	3%	4%	7%	Undecided 68% Someone else 12%

== Results ==
First Ballot
Candidate	Votes	Percentage
Jagmeet Singh	35,266	53.83%
Charlie Angus	12,705	19.39%
Niki Ashton	11,374	17.36%
Guy Caron	6,164	9.41%
Total	65,782	100.00%

- Rejected ballots: 101
- Abstentions: 172
- Turnout: 52.8% (▲1.9pp)
