= Jennifer Hollett =

Canadian television personality and activist

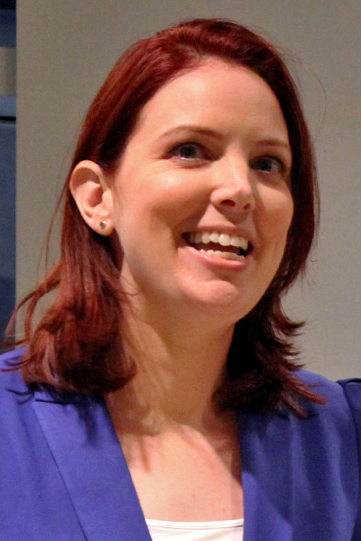
- Hollett in 2015
- Born: September 16, 1975 (age 51)
- Education: Harvard University; Concordia University
- Occupations: Media executive, politician
- Political party: New Democratic Party

Jennifer Hollett (born September 16, 1975) is a Canadian media executive and former television personality and political activist. She was the 2015 New Democratic Party's candidate in the new riding of University—Rosedale. Hollett has a Bachelor of Arts with Distinction in Journalism and Communications from Concordia University in Montreal, and a Masters in Public Administration from the John F. Kennedy School of Government at Harvard University.

Hollett was a contributor to CBC News Network's prime time show Connect with Mark Kelley and was formerly a MuchMusic VJ and videographer, she hosted MuchOnDemand, Much In Your Space, Combat Zone, Power Shift, Count Down, Live@Much and some specials until leaving the network in 2005. Hollett started out as a radio jockey at Concordia University.

Her working career started with Sony Music Canada in the New Media Division working on websites for artists such as Our Lady Peace, Prozzak and Céline Dion. She later moved up to CTV, then to MuchMusic. She hosted "The Chatroom" on TalkTV on the recommendation of a CTV producer she met at Sony. At the end of that year, she was hired by MuchMusic.

In 2006, Hollett volunteered for CARE Canada, touring Canadian Secondary Schools and speaking to youth about her experiences in Kenya with the organization. Hollett has also managed e-communications for Plan Canada (2009), worked with Journalists for Human Rights (2007-2008) to train journalists in Sierra Leone. She is an advocate of girls' and women's rights, and has acted as the Official Summit Moderator for the G(irls)20 Summits in Toronto (2010), Paris (2011), Mexico City (2012), Moscow (2013), Sydney (2014).

While at Harvard, Hollett developed the 'Super Pac App', which helped viewers better understand television campaign ads during the 2012 U.S. election. By recording a snippet of audio from a television ad as it plays, a user can learn who paid for the ad, how much money that political group has raised and spent so far, and through links to nonpartisan news sources, learn about how truthful the claims in the ad are.

Hollett's past includes working with The Leading Change Network to train community activists with Marshall Ganz, a strategist credited with helping to devise the successful grass roots organizing model and training for Barack Obama’s 2008 presidential campaign.

She was an Atkinson Associate on Civic Technology and a Broadbent Leadership Fellow.

Her public speaking appearances include the Hart House Hancock Lecture and TEDx.

In 2016, Hollett was appointed head of news and government for Twitter in Canada. She became the executive director of the Walrus in June 2020.

== Political career ==
In 2013, she sought to be the New Democratic Party's candidate in Toronto Centre for that riding's pending federal by-election, but was defeated for the nomination by Linda McQuaig on September 15, 2013.

Considered a star candidate for the NDP in the newly created federal riding of University—Rosedale in downtown Toronto, Hollett lost her 2015 run for Parliament to Chrystia Freeland of the Liberal Party by a margin of 50% to 28%.

Hollett was a candidate for Toronto city councillor in 2018 until Premier Doug Ford cut city council from 47 seats to 25 seats two-thirds the way into the campaign. She was part of the legal challenge to Bill 5.

== Electoral record ==
2015 Canadian federal election: University—Rosedale
Party	Candidate	Votes	%	±%	Expenditures
Liberal	Chrystia Freeland	27,849	49.80	+19.23	$185,406.36
New Democratic	Jennifer Hollett	15,988	28.59	−15.24	$142,562.73
Conservative	Karim Jivraj	9,790	17.51	−2.62	$83,600.78
Green	Nick Wright	1,641	2.93	−1.73	$19,152.70
Libertarian	Jesse Waslowski	233	0.42	–	$393.64
Animal Alliance	Simon Luisi	126	0.23	–	$153.10
Communist	Drew Garvie	125	0.22	–	–
Bridge	David Berlin	122	0.22	–	–
Marxist–Leninist	Steve Rutchinski	51	0.09	–	–
Total valid votes/expense limit		55,925	99.47		$206,261.82
Total rejected ballots		300	0.53	–	
Turnout		56,225	72.83	–	
Eligible voters		77,205			
Liberal notional gain from New Democratic		Swing		+17.23	
Source: Elections Canada
