= Charlie Angus =

Canadian politician (born 1962)

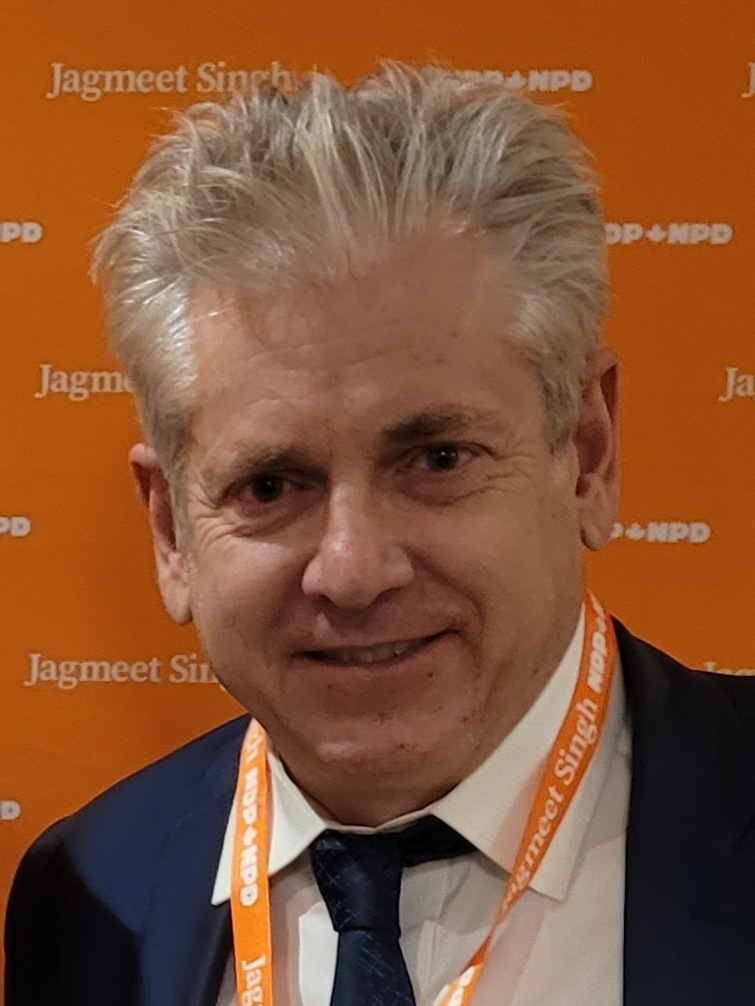
- Angus in 2023

Member of Parliament for Timmins—James Bay
- In office June 28, 2004 – April 28, 2025
- Preceded by: Réginald Bélair
- Succeeded by: Gaétan Malette

Personal details
- Born: Charles Joseph Angus; November 14, 1962 (age 63) Timmins, Ontario, Canada
- Party: New Democratic Party
- Spouse: Brit Griffin (m. 1986)
- Profession: Writer; editor; broadcaster; musician
- Website: charlieangus.ca

Charles Joseph Angus (born November 14, 1962) is a Canadian journalist, musician and politician who served as the member of Parliament (MP) for Timmins—James Bay from 2004 to 2025 as a member of the New Democratic Party (NDP). He is the author of Cobalt: Cradle of the Demon Metals, Birth of a Mining Superpower and has hosted MeidasCanada since 2025. Angus was a candidate for leadership of the federal NDP in the 2017 New Democratic Party leadership election, where he received 19.4% of the vote.

== Early life, music, writing, and activism ==
Angus was born in Timmins, Ontario, and moved to Toronto in 1973, where in 1980 he co-founded the punk rock band L'Étranger with childhood friend Andrew Cash. Angus performed bass and co-wrote many of the group's songs, which were influenced by the Clash and the group's Catholic social justice roots. L'Étranger is best known for their anti-apartheid single "One People", played frequently on the then-new MuchMusic. Angus later co-founded the alternative folk group Grievous Angels. After his election to Parliament, Angus continued to perform with the group on occasion and released a new album in 2021.

Angus was a community activist in Toronto in the 1980s where, along with his wife Brit Griffin, he established a Catholic Worker house, a homeless shelter for men, especially those who were minority refugees and former prisoners. He moved to Cobalt, Ontario, with his young family in 1990. In 1995, Brit and Charlie launched HighGrader, a magazine devoted to Northern Ontario life and culture. In 1999, he received an award from the Northern Lights Festival Boréal in Sudbury for his outstanding contributions to Northern Ontario culture.

He is the author of eight published books, including an admiring biography of Les Costello, the celebrated Toronto Maple Leafs player who left professional hockey to become a Catholic priest in Timmins. Angus's fifth book, Cage Call, a photo documentary with photographer Louie Palu, was released in 2007.

From 2000 to 2004, Angus served as a trustee on the Northeastern Catholic District School Board.

== Federal politics ==
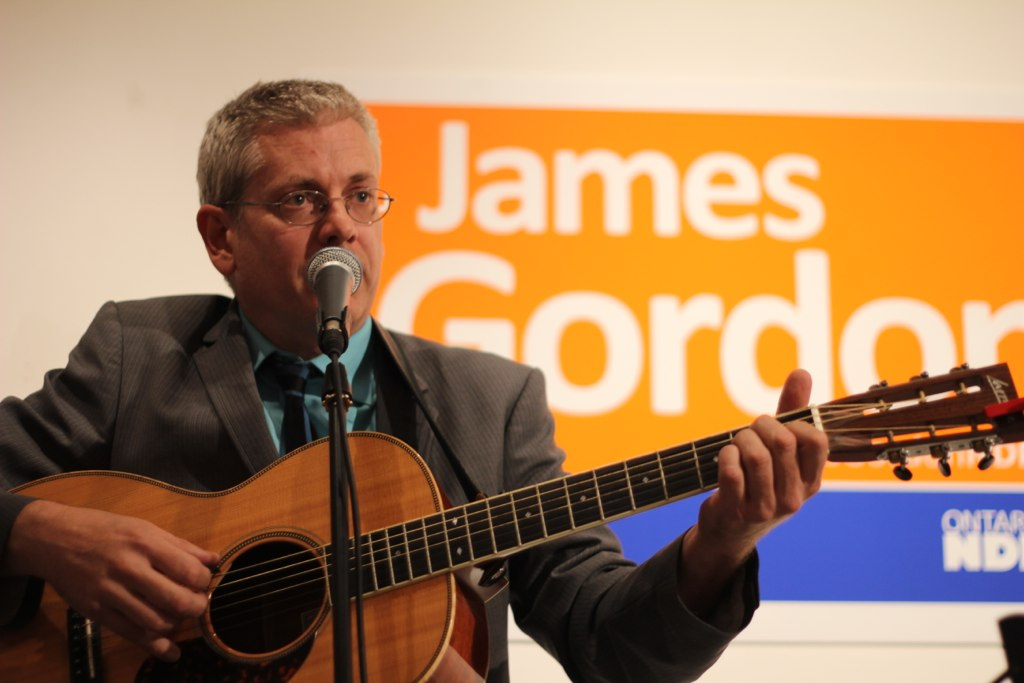
Angus in 2012

Angus entered federal politics in the 2004 election as the successful New Democratic Party candidate in the Ontario riding of Timmins—James Bay, winning election to the House of Commons of Canada by fewer than 600 votes. He was re-elected in the 2006 federal election with an outright majority, over six thousand votes ahead of Liberal challenger Robert Riopelle. Angus was the NDP critic for Canadian heritage from 2004 to 2007, and was additionally critic for agriculture from 2004 to 2006.

In 2005, Angus's parish priest, Father John Lemire, confronted him and threatened to deny him Holy Communion if he voted with the government and his party to legalize same-sex marriage. Angus stood his ground and was denied communion. Angus's treatment provoked widespread public reaction both from those who supported the church's stance and those who supported Angus. Some Catholic MPs were in the latter group, arguing that the Church was selective in its exclusion of practising Catholic MPs from its activities. Angus and fellow NDP MP Joe Comartin were the only two Catholic MPs who supported same-sex marriage but were excluded.

In 2007, he became the NDP critic for Public Works and Treasury Board, as well as the NDP spokesman for digital issues such as copyright and internet neutrality.

In 2006, after he had served just two years as a Member of Parliament, the Toronto Star selected Angus as one of the ten most effective opposition MPs. He also won "Best Constituent Representative" at the 2007 Maclean's Parliamentarian of the Year Awards. Angus was re-elected in the federal elections of both 2008 and 2011. Angus also served as the party's spokesperson on privacy, ethics, and government accountability. Angus voted against a bill to abolish the Canadian Firearms Registry in September 2010. Although the registry is unpopular with many of his constituents, Angus voted against its abolition based on supportive studies provided by police. He subsequently introduced a private member's bill to reform the registry.

He was named to Maclean's magazine's Power List in 2012 as one of the 25 most influential Canadians. The same year, Zoomer Magazine chose him as the third most influential Canadian over the age of 45; he was one of only two MPs on the list, alongside NDP leader Tom Mulcair. In 2011, CTV News Channel's Power Play placed him among the top three MPs of the year, along with the then Conservative Prime Minister, Stephen Harper, and NDP leader Jack Layton, who had died that August. In 2012, Angus backed Paul Dewar to become leader of the NDP.

Angus has been an advocate for the rights of First Nations children and was the co-founder of the Shannen's Dream campaign, named in honour of the late Cree youth leader Shannen Koostachin, who Angus fought alongside to build a new elementary school for her community. In early 2012, Angus's parliamentary motion "Shannen's Dream," calling for an end to the systemic underfunding of First Nations education, passed unanimously through the House of Commons.

After the 2015 federal election, he was appointed NDP critic for Indigenous and Northern Affairs in the 42nd Canadian Parliament and elected Caucus Chair in January 2016. He was also a member of the Aboriginal Affairs and Northern Development committee. He resigned from both roles on November 23, 2016, in to prepare for the 2017 New Democratic Party leadership race. On February 20, 2017, Angus officially registered to run in the NDP leadership race to succeed Tom Mulcair. He placed second with 19.4% of the vote, losing to then Ontario provincial politician Jagmeet Singh. MPs Niki Ashton and Guy Caron respectively came in third and fourth.

Angus was re-elected in the 2019 and 2021 federal elections.

On April 4, 2024, Angus announced that he would not be running for re-election in the 2025 Canadian federal election.

In September 2025, Angus started a YouTube channel in partnership with the MeidasTouch Network under the name Meidas Canada.

Angus endorsed Alberta MP Heather McPherson in the 2026 New Democratic Party leadership election.

== Books ==
- We Lived a Life and Then Some with Brit Griffin, Sally Lawrence, and Rob Moir. Between the Lines Books, 1996. ISBN 1-896357-06-7.
- Industrial Cathedrals of the North, with Louie Palu and Marguerite Andersen. Between the Lines, 1999. ISBN 1-896357-18-0.
- Mirrors of Stone: Fragments from the Porcupine Frontier, with Louie Palu. Between the Lines, 2001. ISBN 1-896357-49-0.
- Les Costello: Canada's Flying Father. Novalis, 2005. ISBN 2-89507-631-6.
- Cage Call, with Louie Palu. Photolucida, 2007. ISBN 978-1-934334-02-7.
- Unlikely Radicals. Between the Lines, 2013. ISBN 9781771130400.
- Children of the Broken Treaty: Canada's Lost Promise and One Girl's Dream. University of Regina Press, 2015. ISBN 978-0889774018.
- Cobalt: Cradle of the Demon Metals, Birth of a Mining Superpower. House of Anansi Press, 2022, ISBN 978-1487009496
- Dangerous Memory: Coming of Age in the Decade of Greed. House of Anansi, 2024. ISBN 9781487012885.

== Honours and awards ==
Angus was selected as "Best Mentor" in Maclean's magazine's 12th annual Parliamentarians of the Year award and was also the 2007 winner for "Best represents constituents". He was also a finalist for "Most knowledgeable".

== Electoral record ==
2021 Canadian federal election: Timmins—James Bay
Party	Candidate	Votes	%	±%	Expenditures
New Democratic	Charlie Angus	12,132	35.1	-5.4	$88,140.09
Conservative	Morgan Ellerton	9,393	27.2	+0.2	$19,999.91
Liberal	Steve Black	8,508	24.6	-1.1	$44,629.30
People's	Stephen MacLeod	4,537	13.1	+9.7	$12,559.12
Total valid votes		34,570			
Total rejected ballots		355	1.02	+0.02	
Turnout		34,925	55.4	-3.2	
Eligible voters		63,041			
New Democratic hold		Swing		-2.8	
Source: Elections Canada

2019 Canadian federal election: Timmins—James Bay
Party	Candidate	Votes	%	±%	Expenditures
New Democratic	Charlie Angus	14,885	40.5	-2.35	$85,828.95
Conservative	Kraymr Grenke	9,907	27.0	+6.60	$38,287.03
Liberal	Michelle Boileau	9,443	25.7	-9.02	$46,774.56
Green	Max Kennedy	1,257	3.4	+1.38	$1,722.98
People's	Renaud Roy	1,248	3.4	–	$9,105.18
Total valid votes/expense limit		36,740	100.0		
Total rejected ballots		369			
Turnout		37,109	58.6		
Eligible voters		63,282			
New Democratic hold		Swing		-4.47	
Source: Elections Canada

2015 Canadian federal election
Party	Candidate	Votes	%	±%	Expenditures
New Democratic	Charlie Angus	15,974	42.85	-7.1	$73,519.39
Liberal	Todd Lever	12,940	34.72	+18.74	$35,151.97
Conservative	John P. Curley	7,605	20.40	-11.48	$37,300.73
Green	Max Kennedy	752	2.02	-0.18	$520.54
Total valid votes/Expense limit		37,271	100.0		$245,251.56
Total rejected ballots		266	–	–	
Turnout		37,537	61.84	+10.84	
Eligible voters		60,692			
New Democratic hold		Swing		-12.89	
Source: Elections Canada

2011 Canadian federal election
Party	Candidate	Votes	%	±%	Expenditures
New Democratic	Charlie Angus	16,738	50.4	-6.1	–
Conservative	Bill Greenberg	10,526	31.7	+13.5	–
Liberal	Marilyn Wood	5,230	15.7	-6.5	–
Green	Lisa Bennett	724	2.2	-0.9	–
Total valid votes/Expense limit		33,218	100.0		
Total rejected ballots		184	0.6	+0.1	
Turnout		33,402	56.5	+5.5	
Eligible voters		59,136	–	–	

2008 Canadian federal election
Party	Candidate	Votes	%	±%	Expenditures
New Democratic	Charlie Angus	17,188	56.5	+6.0	$63,948
Liberal	Paul Taillefer	6,740	22.2	-12.1	$ 31,909
Conservative	Bill Greenberg	5,536	18.2	+4.6	$29,651
Green	Larry Verner	938	3.1	+1.5	$133
Total valid votes/Expense limit		30,402	100.0	-	$97,746
Total rejected ballots		133	0.4		
Turnout		30,535	51.0		

2006 Canadian federal election
Party	Candidate	Votes	%	±%
New Democratic	Charlie Angus	19,150	50.5	+9.1
Liberal	Robert Riopelle	13,028	34.3	-5.3
Conservative	Ken Graham	5,164	13.6	-3.1
Green	Sahaja Freed	610	1.6	-0.7
valid votes		37,952	100.0	
New Democratic hold		Swing		+7.2

2004 Canadian federal election
Party	Candidate	Votes	%	±%
New Democratic	Charlie Angus	14,138	41.4	+19.7
Liberal	Ray Chénier	13,525	39.6	-14.9
Conservative	Andrew Van Oosten	5,682	16.7	-6.2
Green	Marsha Gail Kriss	767	2.3	
Total valid votes			34,112	100.0
