= Louie Palu =

Canadian documentary photographer and filmmaker

Louie Palu RCA
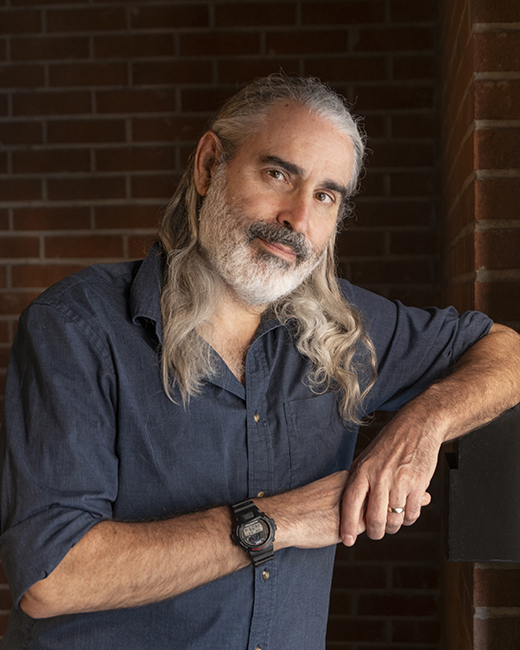
- Palu in 2026
- Born: 1968 (age 57–58); Toronto, Ontario, Canada
- Occupations: Photojournalist, Artist
- Website: louiepalu.photoshelter.com

Louie Palu RCA (born 1968) is a Canadian documentary photographer and filmmaker known for covering social-political issues, including war and human rights. His first major body of work was Cage Call: Life and Death in the Hard Rock Mining Belt with writer Charlie Angus, followed by working for The Globe and Mail for 6 years as a staff photographer (2001–2007). In addition to this, he covered the war in Kandahar, Afghanistan, between 2006 and 2010 and the drug war on the U.S.-Mexico border between 2011 and 2012.

== Personal life and education ==
Palu was born in Toronto, Ontario, Canada in 1968 to Italian immigrant parents. His mother worked as a seamstress before his birth and his father was a stonemason. Palu graduated from the Ontario College of Art and Design University in 1991. He was awarded a summer scholarship to study in New York City. In 1991 Palu worked in New York City as an intern to renowned documentary photographer Mary Ellen Mark.

== Photography ==
Palu is known for numerous long term projects focusing on social-political issues. Examples of his work are as follows.

=== Cage Call ===
Cage Call: Life and Death in the Hard Rock Mining Belt was an in-depth project that began in 1991 and continued until 2003 examining communities in mining regions located in Northwestern Ontario and Northeastern Quebec. This work resulted in the publishing of two books with writer Charlie Angus. The first book was Industrial Cathedrals of the North published by Between the Lines in 1999. The second was Cage Call: Life and Death in the Hard Rock Mining Belt as an award from PhotoLucida. The work is in the collection of Library and Archives Canada and has been published widely, including the Virginia Quarterly Review.

=== Asbestos ===
In 2004, Palu began a project on asbestos and its impact on its victims, which was subsequently published as several articles in The Globe and Mail newspaper such as the story "Dying For a Living" and Report on Business Magazine (RoB Magazine). "Where Asbestos is Just a Fact of Life," published in the December 2011 RoB Magazine, was the most highly recognized single article in that year's National Magazine Awards. Written by John Gray and Stephanie Nolen, with photographs by Louie Palu, it was nominated for a record five awards, taking gold in the business category, silver in politics and public interest and honourable mentions in investigative reporting, health and medicine and science, technology and the environment.

Several more articles which have been published in The Globe and Mail up and to 2016 such as "The Deadly Effects of Asbestos Use" and "No Safe Use", which won a Canadian Online Publishing Award (COPA) No Safe Use, a months-long project which delved into the deadly legacy of Canadians' exposure to asbestos, won a gold medal for Best Interactive Story and was also named winner of the Best Content award. No Safe Use was written by Tavia Grant and edited by Ted Mumford. It included photography and video by Louie Palu.

Palu's work on asbestos also appeared in The Scotsman, Scotland's national newspaper and has been cited in petitions to the Office of the Auditor General of Canada in the use and export of asbestos, as well as by The Rideau Institute in its report "Exporting Harm: How Canada Markets Asbestos to the Developing World" by Kathleen Ruff and during a debate on asbestos in the UK Parliament in 2009 by then British Labour Party Member of Parliament (MP) for Paisley & Renfrewshire North Jim Sheridan.

=== Kandahar, Afghanistan ===
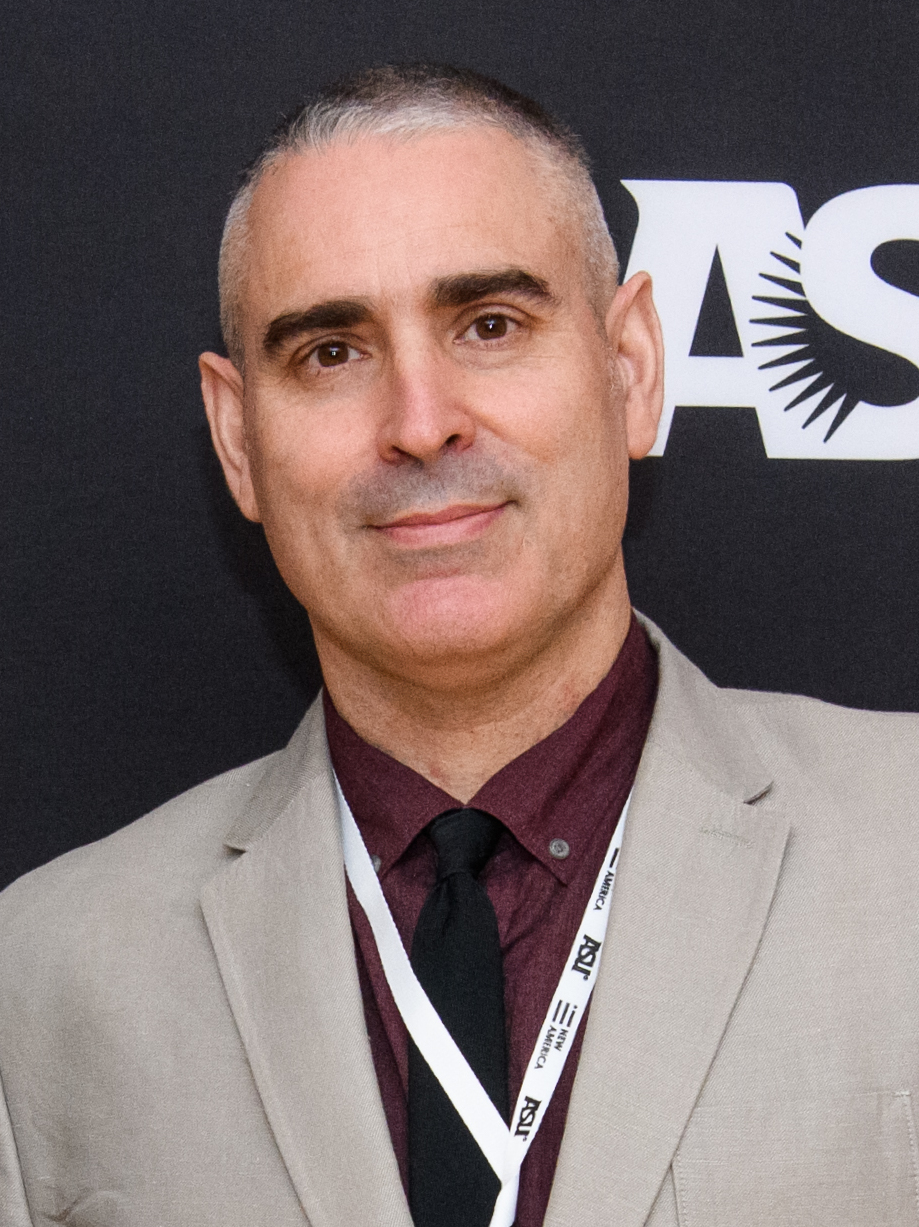
Palu in 2019

While a staff photographer at The Globe and Mail, Louie was sent on an assignment in 2006 to cover the Canadian combat mission in Kandahar, Afghanistan. In early 2007, upon his return, he left The Globe and Mail and joined the photo agency, ZUMA Press, and returned to Kandahar. This was the first of several trips Louie made to cover the war through 2010. In his time spent in Kandahar, he worked embedded and independently of the military, covering frontline combat with Canadian, American, British, and Afghan soldiers. His work was published in many publications including the Virginia Quarterly Review, The Toronto Star, the academic journal of political theory Theory and Event, and has been exhibited at the Canadian War Museum. The completed body of work is entitled: "The Fighting Season."

=== Guantanamo Bay ===
In 2007, Palu made his first of several trips through 2010 to the Guantanamo Bay prison facility, located on a U.S. military installation in Cuba. His photographs of detainees and the prison have been published in The Atlantic, NPR, The New York Times, and The Walrus, along with several others.

=== Mexican drug war ===
Palu was awarded a Bernard L. Schwartz Fellowship from the Washington-based New America Foundation in 2011 to study the drug war in Mexico and its relationship to the United States of America. This work can be found in many publications, such as Foreign Policy Magazine and the Globe and Mail. He was also awarded a Pulitzer Center on Crisis Reporting grant for this project.

=== Arctic ===
Over the course of several years (2015 - ongoing), Palu made more than 150,000 photos in the high Arctic. The work was published in National Geographic along with writing by Neil Shea. In March 2019, Palu created an installation as part of the South by Southwest (SXSW) festival in Texas in which some of the Arctic photographs that appear here were encased in massive blocks of ice that were then placed outdoors so that the ice would gradually melt, exposing the images which was featured on PBS. The work was also exhibited at the McMichael Canadian Art Collection and was awarded the 2019 Arnold Newman Prize For New Directions in Photographic Portraiture Exhibition.

== Publications ==
- Industrial Cathedrals of the North. With Charlie Angus and Marguerite Andersen. Between the Lines Books, 1999. ISBN 1-896357-18-0.
- Mirrors of Stone: Fragments from the Porcupine Frontier. With Charlie Angus. Between the Lines, 2001. ISBN 1-896357-49-0.
- Cage Call: Life and Death in the Hard Rock Mining Belt. With Charlie Angus. Photolucida, 2007. ISBN 978-1-934334-02-7.
- Front Towards Enemy. With an essay by Rebecca Senf. Yoffy Press, Atlanta, GA, 2017. ISBN 978-1-943948-08-6.
- A Field Guid to Asbestos. Yoffy Press, Atlanta, GA, 2019. ISBN 978-1-949608-07-6

== Exhibitions ==
Palu's work has been exhibited in museums, galleries, and festivals. His work was selected for the 2012-2013 landmark exhibition "War/Photography: Images of Armed Conflict and Its Aftermath," curated by Anne Wilkes Tucker, Will Michaels and Natalie Zelt. It opened at the Houston Museum of Fine Arts in November 2012 and has subsequently been exhibited at the Annenberg Space for Photography in Los Angeles, the Corcoran Gallery of Art in Washington DC and the Brooklyn Museum in New York City.

== Awards ==
- 2008: Hasselblad Masters Award, for Editorial Photography
- 2008: Canadian Photojournalist of the Year, News Photographers Association of Canada (NPAC)
- 2009: Aftermath Project Grant, Aftermath Project
- 2010: Alexia Foundation Photography Grant for World Peace and Cultural Understanding
- 2011: National Magazine Award for cover of Report on Business Magazine
- 2011: Bernard L. Schwartz Fellowship, New America Foundation, Washington DC, U.S.A.
- 2012: Pulitzer Center for Crisis Reporting Grant, Washington DC, U.S.A.
- 2013: Pictures of the Year International (POYi), 2nd place, Portrait category
- 2014: Inducted as a member of the Royal Canadian Academy of Arts
- 2016: John Simon Guggenheim Memorial Foundation fellowship
- 2019: Arnold Newman Prize for New Directions in Photographic Portraiture Exhibition
- 2019: 1st Place, Environmental Picture Story, Best of Photojournalism
- 2019: Pulitzer Center on Crisis Reporting Grant

== Collection ==
- Library and Archives Canada, Ottawa, Canada. 50 photographs from "Cathedrals of the North" and 12 photographs from "Cage Call".
