= Danielle Martin =

Canadian physician, health care administrator and academic (born 1975)

Danielle Martin MP
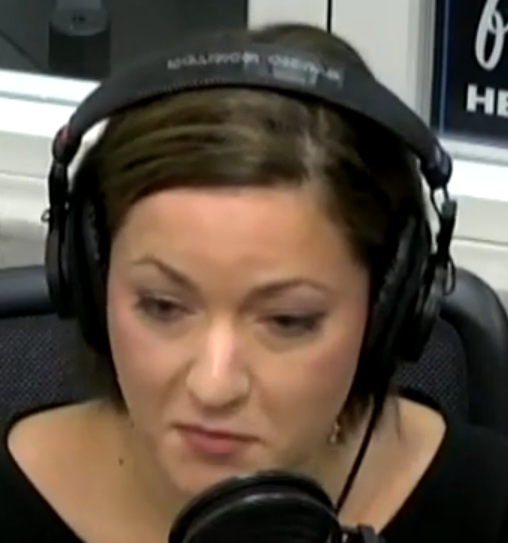
- Martin in 2017

Member of Parliament for University—Rosedale
- Incumbent
- Assumed office April 13, 2026
- Preceded by: Chrystia Freeland

Personal details
- Born: November 1975 (age 50–51)
- Party: Liberal
- Domestic partner: Steven Barrett
- Children: 1
- Education: McGill University (BA); University of Toronto (MPP); University of Western Ontario (MD)
- Occupation: Physician; professor; academic; health care administrator; advocate; politician

Danielle Martin (born November 1975) is a Canadian politician and family physician who has served as the member of Parliament (MP) for University—Rosedale since 2026. A member of the Liberal Party, Martin was elected in a 2026 by-election. She is a professor in the Department of Family and Community Medicine of the University of Toronto Faculty of Medicine.

== Background ==
Martin was born in November 1975 to D'Arcy Martin, a union activist, and Anita Shilton, dean of continuing education at Ryerson University. Shilton had emigrated from Egypt in 1951; the following year, her father suffered a heart attack, which, given Canada's lack of medicare at the time, left the family financially ruined.

Martin completed her bachelor's degree in science from McGill University in 1998 and worked as an assistant to then-Liberal health critic, Gerard Kennedy. She later enrolled at the University of Western Ontario where she earned her M.D. in 2003.

Martin also holds a master's degree in public policy from the Munk School of Global Affairs and Public Policy at the University of Toronto.

== Career ==
Martin became a family physician in 2005 and practised in Northern Ontario for six years. She has served as executive vice president at Women's College Hospital (WCH), and co-founded the WCH Institute for Health System Solutions and Virtual Care (WIHV). She has also worked a family physician in the Family Practice Health Centre at WCH, and as an associate professor in the Department of Family and Community Medicine, the Institute for Health Policy, Management and Evaluation, and the School of Public Policy and Governance at the University of Toronto.

Martin has served as the Chair of the Department of Family and Community Medicine at the University of Toronto since 2021. She took a leave of absence in early 2026 to enter federal politics.

=== Federal politics ===
On January 31, 2026, Martin was nominated as the Liberal candidate for the 2026 University—Rosedale federal by-election, called following the resignation of Chrystia Freeland. She won the by-election on April 13 and was elected the member of Parliament for the riding of University—Rosedale.

== Advocacy ==
In 2006, Martin helped start the organization Canadian Doctors for Medicare and chaired its board until May 2013.

She has debated in favour of Canada's single-payer public healthcare system. On March 13, 2014, she testified at a United States Senate committee investigation on health care systems, specifically regarding issues such as single-payer and multi-payer systems and wait times. After her appearance at this US Senate Committee hearing, she was invited to be a candidate at various levels of Canadian government (municipal, provincial, and federal) by various political parties. On September 13, 2017, she publicly supported of Bernie Sanders' Medicare For All bill, which would seek to introduce a single-payer system of health care in the United States.

== Personal life ==
Martin and her partner, Steven Barrett, have one child.

== Awards and recognition ==
Martin is a recipient of the Canadian Medical Association (CMA) Award for Young Leaders.

In 2019, the CMA awarded Martin the F.N.G. Starr Award. She was the youngest physician to receive the award.

== Published works ==
- Martin, Danielle (2017). Better Now: Six Big Ideas to Improve Health Care for All Canadians. Penguin Canada. ISBN 978-0735232594.

== Electoral record ==
Canadian federal by-election, April 13, 2026: University—Rosedale Resignation of Chrystia Freeland
Party	Candidate	Votes	%	±%
Liberal	Danielle Martin	19,961	64.33	+0.33
New Democratic	Serena Purdy	5,870	18.92	+9.02
Conservative	Don Hodgson	3,852	12.41	-11.08
Green	Andrew Massey	915	2.95	+1.24
People's	Andy D’Andrea	206	0.66	–
Centrist	Imran Khan	66	0.21	–
Canadian Future	Samuel Baxter	55	0.18	–
Independent	Raiden DeDominicis	45	0.15	–
Independent	Bill Whatcott	36	0.12	–
No Affiliation	Leslie Bory	22	0.07	–
Total valid votes		31,028		
Total rejected ballots		87		
Turnout		31,115	33.11	-32.34
Eligible voters		93,971		
Liberal hold		Swing		-4.32
Source: Elections Canada
