= David Berlin =

Canadian editor

Leader of The Bridge Party of Canada
- In office 2015–2017
- Preceded by: Party founded*
- Succeeded by: Party dissolved*

Personal details
- Born: David Zafrir Berlin; May 14, 1951 (age 75) Israel
- Party: New Democratic Party (2000–2015, 2017–present); Bridge Party (2015–2017)
- Education: University of Chicago

Military service
- Allegiance: Israel
- Branch/service: Israeli Army
- Battles/wars: Yom Kippur War; Battle of the Sinai

David Zafrir Berlin (born May 14, 1951) is a Canadian editor, writer, politician, educator best known for being the co-founder and first editor of The Walrus from 2003 to 2004 and former editor and owner of the Literary Review of Canada from 1998 to 2001. He has edited several books including What’s Left: The New Democratic Party in Renewal (2001) as well as over a hundred essays and articles.

Berlin was born in Israel in 1951 but raised in Toronto, where his family settled in 1953. He returned to Israel in 1970, living there for eight years, before returning to Canada.

He served his military duty with the Israeli Army in the reconnaissance unit, Sayeret Shaked under Ariel Sharon's command and took part in Sharon's Suez campaign during the Yom Kippur War in 1973. He attended medical school at Tel-Aviv University and then graduated from the University of Chicago's program on social and political thought, and taught at several universities.

Berlin's writing has appeared in Saturday Night, the Literary Review of Canada, The Globe and Mail, the National Post and Ha'aretz among other publications.

Berlin was the New Democratic Party of Canada's candidate in Toronto Centre in the 2000 federal election. In 2015, he founded and led of The Bridge Party of Canada, running as its candidate in University—Rosedale in the 2015 federal election. The party was deregistered on January 31, 2017.

In 2011, Berlin wrote The Moral Lives of Israelis: Reinventing the Dream State in which he argued for Israel to become "not a Jewish state, but only a state rather like New York City – a state in which many Jews live."

In June 2017, Berlin announced his candidacy for the leadership of the NDP. However, he was unable to submit a deposit and the required number of nominating signatures by the July 3, 2017 deadline and thus did not qualify as a candidate.

== Electoral record ==
2015 Canadian federal election: University—Rosedale
Party	Candidate	Votes	%	±%	Expenditures
Liberal	Chrystia Freeland	27,849	49.80	+19.23	$185,406.36
New Democratic	Jennifer Hollett	15,988	28.59	−15.24	$142,562.73
Conservative	Karim Jivraj	9,790	17.51	−2.62	$83,600.78
Green	Nick Wright	1,641	2.93	−1.73	$19,152.70
Libertarian	Jesse Waslowski	233	0.42	–	$393.64
Animal Alliance	Simon Luisi	126	0.23	–	$153.10
Communist	Drew Garvie	125	0.22	–	–
Bridge	David Berlin	122	0.22	–	–
Marxist–Leninist	Steve Rutchinski	51	0.09	–	–
Total valid votes/expense limit		55,925	99.47		$206,261.82
Total rejected ballots		300	0.53	–	
Turnout		56,225	72.83	–	
Eligible voters		77,205			
Liberal notional gain from New Democratic		Swing		+17.23	
Source: Elections Canada

2000 Canadian federal election: Toronto Centre—Rosedale
Party	Candidate	Votes	%	±%
Liberal	Bill Graham	26,203	55.33	+6.08
Progressive Conservative	Randall Pearce	8,149	17.21	-2.13
New Democratic	David Berlin	5,300	11.19	-9.22
Alliance	Richard Walker	5,058	10.68	+2.83
Canadian Action	Paul Hellyer	1,466	3.10	+2.44
Marijuana	Neev Tapiero	722	1.52	
Natural Law	David Gordon	224	0.47	-0.11
Communist	Dan Goldstick	121	0.26	
Marxist–Leninist	Philip Fernandez	116	0.24	-0.11
Total valid votes		47,359	100.00	
Total rejected ballots		246	0.52	−0.38
Turnout		47,605	57.19	−9.82
Electors on the lists		83,243		
Sources: Official Results, Elections Canada, Poll-by-poll Result Files, Elections Canada, and Financial Returns, Elections Canada.
