= Pat Stogran =

Colonel Pat Stogran

Veterans' Ombudsman
- In office 2007–2010
- Preceded by: Office established
- Succeeded by: Guy Parent

Personal details
- Party: New Democratic Party
- Children: 2
- Education: Royal Roads Military College; Royal Military College; United States Army War College
- Occupation: Soldier, public servant

Military service
- Allegiance: Canada
- Branch/service: Canadian Army
- Years of service: 1976–2007
- Rank: Colonel
- Unit: Princess Patricia's Canadian Light Infantry; Canadian Airborne Regiment
- Battles/wars: Bosnian War; War in Afghanistan

Pat Stogran is a retired Colonel of the Canadian Forces Princess Patricia's Canadian Light Infantry (PPCLI) and was Canada's first Veteran's Ombudsman. In 2010, Stogran criticized the Conservative government's choice to enforce the New Veterans Charter, which was signed into law by the previous Liberal government in 2005 after approval by all parties. Among other changes, it took away veterans' disability pensions in favour of a one-time lump sum payment (which could be paid monthly).

These were deemed inadequate when compared to compensation received by civilians who were similarly injured in industrial accidents. In 2017 he was briefly a candidate for the federal leadership of the New Democratic Party.

== Early life ==
Stogran grew up in Northern Quebec with a great love of the outdoors and extreme, over-the-top competition. The second oldest of four brothers – his father was a mining executive who eventually moved the family to British Columbia – Stogran thought regular snowball fights were boring, so he organized games of skins versus shirts. Fishing trips became endurance tests and overnight camping were a survival game. He acquired a martial arts third-degree black belt.

In 1976, after high school, Stogran went to Royal Roads Military College in Victoria, British Columbia, as a way to get an electrical engineering degree in exchange for military service after graduation. He also holds a Master of Strategic Studies from the United States Army War College.

== Military career ==
Stogran graduated from the Royal Military College of Canada in 1980 and was commissioned in Princess Patricia's Canadian Light Infantry. His initial employment was with that regiment's Third Battalion in CFB Esquimalt in British Columbia. In the latter half of the 1980s, he was employed as the regimental adjutant of the Canadian Airborne Regiment in CFB Petawawa in Ontario. In 1993, Stogran served in the Bosnian War (in the Siege of Goražde) as a Military Observer. He was subsequently awarded a Mentioned-in-Dispatches for courage under fire. In 1994, he had a public disagreement with United Nations commander Sir Michael Rose over the military strategy in Bosnia.

In 2001, Stogran was commanding officer of the first Canadian soldiers in Afghanistan. Stogran and his soldiers deployed on three battalion-level combat missions in Afghanistan — including one looking for Osama bin Laden or his remains. He was commander when four Canadian soldiers were killed from an American fighter pilot's friendly fire. In 2002, after returning from Afghanistan, Stogran was promoted to Colonel and commanded a joint operations group based out of Kingston, Ontario.

== Veterans' Ombudsman ==
In 2007, after taking office, the Conservative government passed the New Veterans Charter and the Veterans Bill of Rights in accordance with its campaign promises. Among other changes, the Office of the Veterans Ombudsman was created. The ombudsman was to report directly to the Minister of Veterans Affairs and would independently ensure the department's compliance with the Veterans Bill of Rights. On October 15, 2007, Stogran was appointed as Canada's first Veterans Ombudsman.

In 2010, a spokesman for Veterans Affairs Canada confirmed Stogran's appointment would not be renewed. The department would not comment on its reason for not renewing his appointment, although several commentators suggested it was due to his outspokenness and criticism of the Conservative government. In November 2010, Stogran was replaced by retired Chief Warrant Officer Guy Parent, who was given a five-year term.

== Later life ==
After leaving the ombudsmanship, Stogran spoke frequently about veteran's rights, including his own struggles with posttraumatic stress disorder (PTSD). He set up a website, The Rebel Gorilla, to help showcase veterans' issues. He has found music to be therapeutic; he plays folk guitar. He holds concerts and uses that opportunity to raise awareness of the precarious state of Canada's veterans and PTSD. He started an organization, Singing for Change, to raise money for Wounded Warriors Canada.

On April 20, 2017, Stogran announced his candidacy for the federal leadership of the New Democratic Party. He withdrew his candidacy on June 3, 2017, after complaining that there were too many obstacles preventing candidates from growing the party from the grassroots.

== Personal ==
He has a wife and two grown children.
