= Grievous Angels =

Canadian alternative country band

- Origin: Toronto, Ontario, Canada
- Genres: Alternative country
- Years active: 1986–2004, 2008–present
- Members: Charlie Angus; Peter Jellard; Tim Hadley; Ian McKendry; Nathan Mahaffy; Alexandra Bell
- Past members: Rick Conroy; Michelle Rumball; Peter Duffin; Lynn Simmons; Kirsti MacLeod; Dave Patterson; Al Lamore; Andy Seguire; Janet Mercier

Grievous Angels are a Canadian alternative country band, active since 1986. The band's name is a reference to the Gram Parsons album Grievous Angel. Their primary leader is singer-songwriter Charlie Angus, who entered electoral politics in 2004 as the New Democratic Party Member of Parliament for Timmins-James Bay.

== Early years ==
The group was originally formed in Toronto in 1986 by Angus, vocalist Michelle Rumball and fiddler Peter Jellard after Angus left the punk rock band L'Étranger. They began as a collective of street buskers, and eventually began playing Toronto-area bars, specifically the old Cabana Room of the Spadina Hotel. Tim Hadley and drummer Peter Duffin joined the band in 1987. The band quickly became a popular draw at folk festivals across Canada, and released their debut album, Toute la Gang, in 1989.

They followed up with One Job Town in 1990, garnering national radio airplay for the singles "Gordie and My Old Man" and "Crossing the Causeway". Reviewers lauded the album, with Richard Wagamese of the Calgary Herald calling it the Canadian equivalent of Bruce Springsteen's Nebraska. However, Rumball was suffering from voice problems at this time and did not participate in the tour to support the album, with vocals instead being performed by Lynn Simmons and Kirsti MacLeod. The album was nominated for Best Roots or Traditional Album at the Juno Awards of 1991, and the band was nominated for Best Country Group or Duo at the Juno Awards of 1992.

== Return to Northern Ontario ==
Around this time, Rumball left the band and Angus moved to Cobalt, Ontario. The band scaled back for a time, performing only in the Northern Ontario region as they prepared their third album, Watershed; the album was marked by Angus taking over lead vocals, and addressed the changes in his life in songs such as "Starting Over at Thirty" and "North of the Watershed". They were named one of the hottest up-and-coming bands in Canada by Maclean's in 1994.

In 1995, Angus launched HighGrader, a magazine about Northern Ontario life and culture, and joined CBC Radio One as a correspondent and commentator for its Sudbury station CBCS.

In 1996, Grievous Angels released Waiting for the Cage, a concept album about life in Northern Ontario mining towns which also included an interactive CD-ROM feature. The CD-ROM feature won an award from the New York Expo of Short Film and Video.

In 1999, Angus was presented the Jackie Washington Award, for his contributions to Northern Ontario's cultural life, by Sudbury's Northern Lights Festival Boréal. The band also released 22 Trailer Park that year.

In the summer of 2000, Duffin retired from the band, and Hadley accepted a gig touring with Stompin' Tom Connors. Duffin was replaced by Dave Patterson. Drummer Al Lamore also joined the band. During this era, Angus became involved in political activism in the campaign against the proposal to ship Toronto's garbage to the abandoned Adams Mine in Kirkland Lake.

The band released Hanging Songs in 2003. The album included a song about the Adams Mine campaign.

== Hiatus And Return ==
The following year, Angus ran for the New Democratic Party nomination in Timmins-James Bay; he won the nomination and used his musical background as part of his campaign, most notably performing Stompin' Tom Connors' "The Hockey Song" and Jimmy Cliff's "The Harder They Come" as duets with Jack Layton when Layton made a visit to Timmins. He won the seat in the 2004 election. He kept a previously-booked engagement at the Northern Lights Festival Boréal the following week before the band went on hiatus; however, Angus continued to use music as part of his political career, sometimes performing songs at political rallies and meetings.

The band returned to recording in 2011 with a single, "Diamonds in the Snow", recorded with Angus' former L'Étranger bandmate Andrew Cash. Cash was by this time also a Member of Parliament, and he and Angus jointly led a number of NDP caucus singalongs, including "Bud the Spud" upon the death of Stompin' Tom Connors, and "Four Strong Winds" upon the Alberta New Democratic Party's victory in the 2015 Alberta general election.

In 2013, the band released the album Great Divide. The song "Four Horses" was influenced by the book Clearing the Plains, and was made into a video with the University of Regina Press.

The band have also returned to playing select folk festival dates.

In 2021, the band released the album Summer Before the Storm, their first new album in eight years. The lineup saw Angus, Jellard, and Hadley joined by new members Janet Mercier on vocals, Ian McKendry on guitar, and Nathan Mahaffy on drums. Skydiggers vocalist, Andy Maize, contributes guest vocals on several tracks.

In 2024, they released Last Call for Cinderella, their ninth album, with the same lineup with the exception of vocalist Janet Mercier, but now joined by Alexandra Bell on vocals and piano.

Revolution followed in February 2026, with the same lineup joined by sax player Dan Bone and vocalists Andy Maize and Haley Austin. Maja Bannerman (vocals/spoken word) and Rusty McCarthy (guitalele, vocals) appear on "Song For Joan Of Arc".

== Discography ==
- 1989: Toute la Gang
- 1990: One Job Town
- 1993: Watershed
- 1996: Waiting for the Cage
- 1999: 22 Trailer Park
- 2003: Hanging Songs
- 2013: Great Divide
- 2021: Summer Before the Storm
- 2024: Last Call for Cinderella
- 2026: Revolution
