= Brit Griffin =

Canadian journalist and writer

Brit Griffin (born c. 1959), is a Canadian writer.

== Biography ==
Griffin met musician and later politician Charlie Angus in 1981, when Angus was a member of the band L'Étranger. They married, cofounded a homeless shelter in downtown Toronto in 1985, and moved to Cobalt, Ontario, in 1990. In 1995, while living in Cobalt, Griffin and Angus cofounded HighGrader; Griffin acted as the magazine's publisher, while Angus was its editor.

Griffin was a co-author with Angus of the 1996 book We Lived a Life and Then Some (ISBN 1896357067) and the 1998 musical play Wildcat. She has also been published in the Jesuit magazine Compass.

In 2014, she published her debut novel, The Wintermen, with Sudbury-based Scrivener Press. In 2018, she released the sequel, "The Wintermen II: Into the Deep Dark" with Latitude 46. Her latest novel is The Haunting of Modesto O'Brien, a gothic thriller.

Griffin's poetry has been published in Room, a magazine focusing on literature, art, and feminism. She has published short stories in Climate Culture.

== Awards and honours ==
Griffin won two American Catholic Press awards for her writing and works as a freelancer in print, video, and radio. She currently works for First Nations.
