= University—Rosedale (federal electoral district) =

Federal electoral district in Ontario, Canada

Ontario electoral district
- Interactive map of riding boundaries from the 2025 federal election
- Coordinates: 43.668707°N 79.394130°W

Federal electoral district
- Legislature: House of Commons
MP
Danielle Martin
Liberal
- District created: 2013
- First contested: 2015
- Last contested: 2025
- District webpage: profile, map

Demographics
- Population (2021): 106,216
- Electors (2015): 71,945
- Area (km²): 14
- Pop. density (per km²): 7,586.9
- Census division: Toronto
- Census subdivision: Toronto (part)

University—Rosedale is a federal electoral district in Ontario, Canada, that has been represented in the House of Commons of Canada since 2015. The riding was previously represented by Chrystia Freeland, former Minister of Finance and former deputy prime minister of Canada, until she resigned in 2026. Danielle Martin was elected to fill the vacancy in a 2026 by-election.

== History ==
University—Rosedale was created by the 2012 federal electoral boundaries redistribution and was legally defined in the 2013 representation order. It came into effect upon the call of the 42nd Canadian federal election in October 2015. The riding was created out of the northern parts of the electoral districts of Trinity—Spadina and Toronto Centre. The map was redrawn in 2023 and came into effect in the 2025 federal election.

== Geography ==
The riding includes Toronto's entire University neighbourhood, named for the University of Toronto (St. George campus), plus the neighbourhoods of Rosedale, Little Italy, the Annex and Yorkville, among others, plus the northwestern portion of Downtown Toronto.

== Demographics ==
According to the 2021 Canadian census

Ethnic groups: 61.2% White, 14.4% Chinese, 6.1% South Asian, 3.5% Black, 2.2% Latin American, 2.1% Korean, 1.6% Arab, 1.6% West Asian, 1.4% Filipino, 1.3% Indigenous, 1.3% Southeast Asian

Languages: 60.4% English, 6.3% Mandarin, 3.7% Cantonese, 2.8% Portuguese, 2.3% Spanish, 2.2% French, 1.6% Italian, 1.5% Korean, 1.2% Arabic, 1.1% Russian, 1.1% Persian

Religions: 34.8% Christian (18.0% Catholic, 4.0% Anglican, 2.3% Christian Orthodox, 2.1% United Church, 1.1% Presbyterian, 7.3% other), 6.9% Jewish, 4.4% Muslim, 2.1% Buddhist, 2.1% Hindu, 48.3% none

Median income: $47,200 (2020)

Average income: $103,900 (2020)

== Members of Parliament ==
This riding has elected the following members of Parliament:

| Parliament | Years | Member | Party |
|---|---|---|---|
University—Rosedale; Riding created from Trinity—Spadina and Toronto Centre
| 42nd | 2015–2019 | Chrystia Freeland | Liberal |
| 43rd | 2019–2021 | Chrystia Freeland | Liberal |
| 44th | 2021–2025 | Chrystia Freeland | Liberal |
| 45th | 2025–2026 | Chrystia Freeland | Liberal |
| 45th | 2026–present | Danielle Martin | Liberal |

== Election results ==
Canadian federal by-election, April 13, 2026 Resignation of Chrystia Freeland
| Party | Candidate | Votes | % | ±% |
|---|---|---|---|---|
| Liberal | Danielle Martin | 19,961 | 64.33 | +0.33 |
| New Democratic | Serena Purdy | 5,870 | 18.92 | +9.02 |
| Conservative | Don Hodgson | 3,852 | 12.41 | -11.08 |
| Green | Andrew Massey | 915 | 2.95 | +1.24 |
| People's | Andy D’Andrea | 206 | 0.66 | – |
| Centrist | Imran Khan | 66 | 0.21 | – |
| Canadian Future | Samuel Baxter | 55 | 0.18 | – |
| Independent | Raiden DeDominicis | 45 | 0.15 | – |
| Independent | Bill Whatcott | 36 | 0.12 | – |
| No Affiliation | Leslie Bory | 22 | 0.07 | – |
| Total valid votes | | 31,028 | | |
| Total rejected ballots | | 87 | | |
| Turnout | | 31,015 | 33.11 | -32.34 |
| Eligible voters | | 93,971 | | |
| Liberal hold | | Swing | | -4.32 |
Source: Elections Canada

2025 Canadian federal election
| Party | Candidate | Votes | % | ±% |
|---|---|---|---|---|
| Liberal | Chrystia Freeland | 39,847 | 64.00 | +17.51 |
| Conservative | Liz Grade | 14,624 | 23.49 | +5.54 |
| New Democratic | Serena Purdy | 6,168 | 9.91 | –18.17 |
| Green | Ignacio Mongrell | 1,066 | 1.71 | –2.73 |
| Communist | Drew Garvie | 304 | 0.49 | +0.03 |
| Marxist–Leninist | Barbara Biley | 138 | 0.22 | N/A |
| Independent | Adam Golding | 118 | 0.19 | N/A |
| Total valid votes | | 62,265 | 99.26 | |
| Total rejected ballots | | 466 | 0.74 | -0.14 |
| Turnout | | 62,731 | 65.45 | +6.33 |
| Eligible voters | | 95,844 | | |
| Liberal notional hold | | Swing | | +5.98 |
Source: Elections Canada

2021 federal election redistributed results
| Party | Vote | % |
|---|---|---|
| Liberal | 24,391 | 46.48 |
| New Democratic | 14,731 | 28.07 |
| Conservative | 9,415 | 17.94 |
| Green | 2,332 | 4.44 |
| People's | 1,357 | 2.59 |
| Communist | 239 | 0.46 |
| Animal Protection | 9 | 0.02 |
| Total valid votes | 52,474 | 99.12 |
| Rejected ballots | 467 | 0.88 |
| Registered voters/ estimated turnout | 89,544 | 59.12 |

2021 Canadian federal election
| Party | Candidate | Votes | % | ±% | Expenditures |
|---|---|---|---|---|---|
| Liberal | Chrystia Freeland | 21,716 | 47.53 | −4.14 | $85,780.47 |
| New Democratic | Nicole Robicheau | 11,921 | 25.24 | +3.33 | $32,287.56 |
| Conservative | Steven Taylor | 9,473 | 20.06 | +3.78 | $97,838.32 |
| Green | Tim Grant | 1,974 | 4.18 | −4.29 | $23,475.69 |
| People's | David Kent | 1,172 | 2.48 | +1.59 | $5,169.67 |
| Communist | Drew Garvie | 244 | 0.52 | +0.27 | $0.00 |
| Total valid votes/expense limit | | 47,235 | 99.12 | – | $109,583.59 |
| Total rejected ballots | | 420 | 0.88 | +0.39 | |
| Turnout | | 47,655 | 60.41 | -8.67 | |
| Eligible voters | | 78,886 | | | |
| Liberal hold | | Swing | | –3.73 | |
Source: Elections Canada

2019 Canadian federal election
| Party | Candidate | Votes | % | ±% | Expenditures |
|---|---|---|---|---|---|
| Liberal | Chrystia Freeland | 29,652 | 51.67 | +1.87 | $83,556.09 |
| New Democratic | Melissa Jean-Baptiste Vajda | 12,573 | 21.91 | −6.68 | $28,390.50 |
| Conservative | Helen-Claire Tingling | 9,342 | 16.28 | −1.23 | $38,588.65 |
| Green | Tim Grant | 4,861 | 8.47 | +5.54 | $33,386.65 |
| People's | Aran Lockwood | 510 | 0.89 | – | none listed |
| Animal Protection | Liz White | 159 | 0.28 | +0.05 | none listed |
| Communist | Drew Garvie | 143 | 0.25 | +0.03 | none listed |
| Stop Climate Change | Karin Brothers | 124 | 0.22 | – | none listed |
| Marxist–Leninist | Steve Rutschinski | 27 | 0.05 | −0.04 | none listed |
| Total valid votes/expense limit | | 57,391 | 99.51 | | |
| Total rejected ballots | | 281 | 0.49 | -0.05 | |
| Turnout | | 57,672 | 69.08 | -3.74 | |
| Eligible voters | | 83,485 | | | |
| Liberal hold | | Swing | | +4.28 | |
Source: Elections Canada

2015 Canadian federal election
| Party | Candidate | Votes | % | ±% | Expenditures |
|---|---|---|---|---|---|
| Liberal | Chrystia Freeland | 27,849 | 49.80 | +19.23 | $185,406.36 |
| New Democratic | Jennifer Hollett | 15,988 | 28.59 | −15.24 | $142,562.73 |
| Conservative | Karim Jivraj | 9,790 | 17.51 | −2.62 | $83,600.78 |
| Green | Nick Wright | 1,641 | 2.93 | −1.73 | $19,152.70 |
| Libertarian | Jesse Waslowski | 233 | 0.42 | – | $393.64 |
| Animal Alliance | Simon Luisi | 126 | 0.23 | – | $153.10 |
| Communist | Drew Garvie | 125 | 0.22 | – | – |
| Bridge | David Berlin | 122 | 0.22 | – | – |
| Marxist–Leninist | Steve Rutchinski | 51 | 0.09 | – | – |
| Total valid votes/expense limit | | 55,925 | 99.47 | | $206,261.82 |
| Total rejected ballots | | 300 | 0.53 | – | |
| Turnout | | 56,225 | 72.83 | – | |
| Eligible voters | | 77,205 | | | |
| Liberal notional gain from New Democratic | | Swing | | +17.23 | |
Source: Elections Canada

2011 federal election redistributed results
| Party | Vote | % |
|---|---|---|
| New Democratic | 20,452 | 43.83 |
| Liberal | 14,266 | 30.57 |
| Conservative | 9,393 | 20.13 |
| Green | 2,175 | 4.66 |
| Others | 379 | 0.81 |

== See also ==
- List of Canadian electoral districts
- Historical federal electoral districts of Canada
