= HighGrader =

Canadian magazine

HighGrader is a Canadian cultural magazine. It was launched in 1995 by musician Charlie Angus and his wife, Brit Griffin, as a venue for journalism relating to rural lifestyle and culture in Northern Ontario.

Former newspaper publisher Syl Belisle of Timmins bought the magazine in 2004, and has since made several editorial and design changes. HighGrader supports northern Ontario writers, photographers and artists. Its circulation is worldwide consisting mostly ex-pats. HighGrader is published bi-monthly.
