= L'Étranger (band) =

Canadian punk rock band

- Origin: Toronto, Ontario, Canada
- Genres: Punk rock, new wave
- Years active: 1980–1986
- Labels: Sensible Record Company; Ground Zero Records
- Past members: Andrew Cash; Charlie Angus; Peter Duffin; Bruce "Bruce P.M." Meikle; Tim Vesely

L'Étranger (The Stranger or The Outsider) was a Canadian punk rock band based in Toronto, Ontario. Named for the novel L'Étranger by Albert Camus, the band played a politically minded brand of punk music that drew on both Clash influences and the band members' social justice-oriented Roman Catholic faith. The band was best known for their anti-apartheid single "One People", one of the first independent videos ever to gain airplay on MuchMusic.

== History ==
L'Étranger was founded in 1980 in Toronto, Ontario. by childhood friends, singer/songwriter and guitarist Andrew Cash and bassist Charlie Angus, along with drummer Peter Duffin. That lineup released one six-song EP, Innocent Hands in 1982. The songs were composed by Cash and Angus, and some had political themes; some critics referred to the band as "Gang of Four with a sense of humour".

At that time the band was playing in various clubs and music venues in Toronto, performing regularly at the Cabana Room in the Spadina Hotel. Bruce Meikle, under the stage name "Bruce P.M.", was added to the line-up in time for the second EP, 1984's Running Out of Funtown. The band was by then performing more widely around Ontario, managed by James Booth.

Angus left the band to form Grievous Angels, and was replaced by Tim Vesely for the band's final EP, Sticks and Stones in 1986. Liner notes for the EP mention him as a group member who was not involved in the recording.

L'Étranger disbanded later in 1986, and Cash began performing as a solo artist. His first solo release was a reissue of Sticks and Stones. He went on to record several albums as a solo singer-songwriter and as a member of The Cash Brothers, and also worked as a freelance journalist. Duffin later co-founded the acoustic pop band Barnhouse Static with Canadian songwriter Kathy Evans.

As of 2011, Angus and Cash were both in politics, sitting in the House of Commons of Canada as members of the New Democratic Party caucus. Cash lost a re-election bid in 2015, and Angus remained a Member of Parliament up to 2025 after choosing to not seek reelection. Angus ran as a candidate for the leadership of the New Democratic Party in 2017 and came in second place.

== Discography ==
- 1982: Innocent Hands
- 1983: Running Out of Funtown
- 1986: Sticks and Stones
