= The Bridge Party of Canada =

- Leader: David Berlin
- Founder: David Berlin
- Founded: June 28, 2015 (registered)
- Dissolved: January 31, 2017
- Headquarters: Toronto, Ontario
- Ideology: non-partisan

Website
- The Bridge Party

The Bridge Party of Canada was a Canadian political party. In the 2015 Canadian federal election, the party ran one candidate, its leader David Berlin, in University—Rosedale. He received 122 votes, representing 0.218% of the votes in the riding, 0.001% of all votes in Canada.

The party was deregistered in January 2017.

== Ideology ==
According to its website, The Bridge Party was effectively non-partisan. The party refused to take a position "on issues which routinely divide Canadians and which distinguish one political party from another". The aim of the party, instead of achieving power and influence, was to change the way in which Canadians relate to one another on the subject of politics and cause Canadians to have a deep conversation about the future of the country.

The party proposed a "bottom up" platform in which citizens would vote on issues rather than for parties and personalities. Elections would occur in two discrete stages. Stage one; by employing an online collective decision- making platform, the first ever "people's platform" would be established. Stage two would be a vote not for representatives but for teams capable of managing the "volonte generale", the "will of the people as a whole". Cabinet After a multiple-round process of short-listing qualified candidates, managers would choose a Prime Minister.

Additionally, the role of the Prime Minister would be greatly reduced. According to the party, the role of the Prime Minister would be to generally oversee the missions of the cabinet ministers, and represent the country abroad.

In terms of economic policy, the party called for a 20-hour work week, increased investments in the humanities and social sciences, and a shift from economic measurements that are based on productivity and GDP to those that measure happiness.
